= 2022 Streamer Awards =

Live streaming awards ceremony

- Awarded for: Excellence in live streaming
- Sponsored by: AT&T, Spotify, Fansly, Nitro Stream Racing, Mountain Dew, KFC
- Date: March 11, 2023
- Location: Wiltern Theatre, Los Angeles, California
- Country: United States
- Hosted by: QTCinderella & Valkyrae
- Preshow hosts: Ludwig Ahgren, Hasan Piker, Squeex, & Sweet Anita
- Acts: Nicki Taylor, Charming Jo, Yung Gravy
- Most nominations: Jerma985 (3)

Streaming coverage
- Network: Twitch
- Runtime: 137 minutes
- Viewership: 580,159 peak viewers
- Directed by: QTCinderella

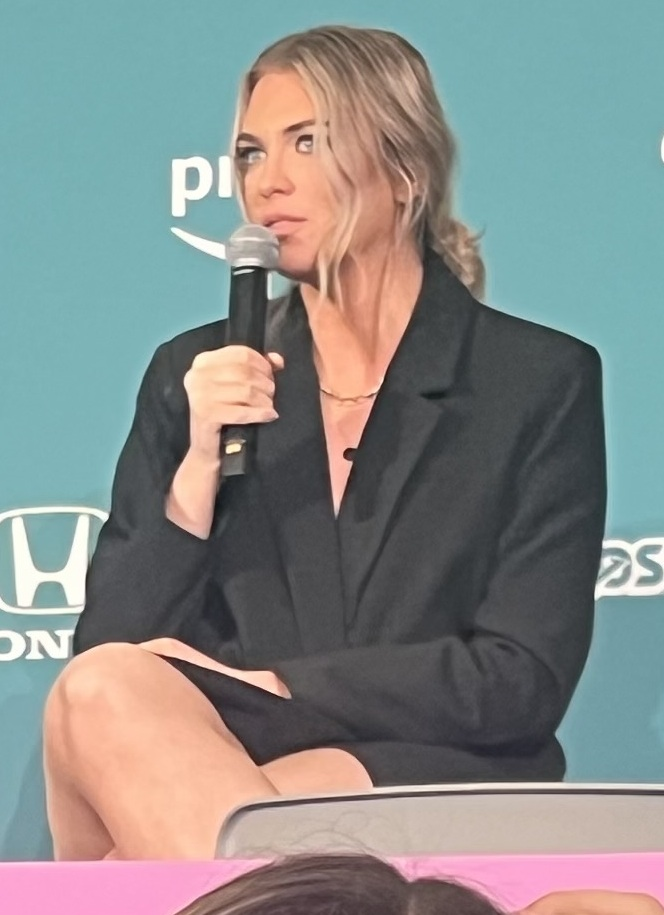
QTCinderella hosted the show

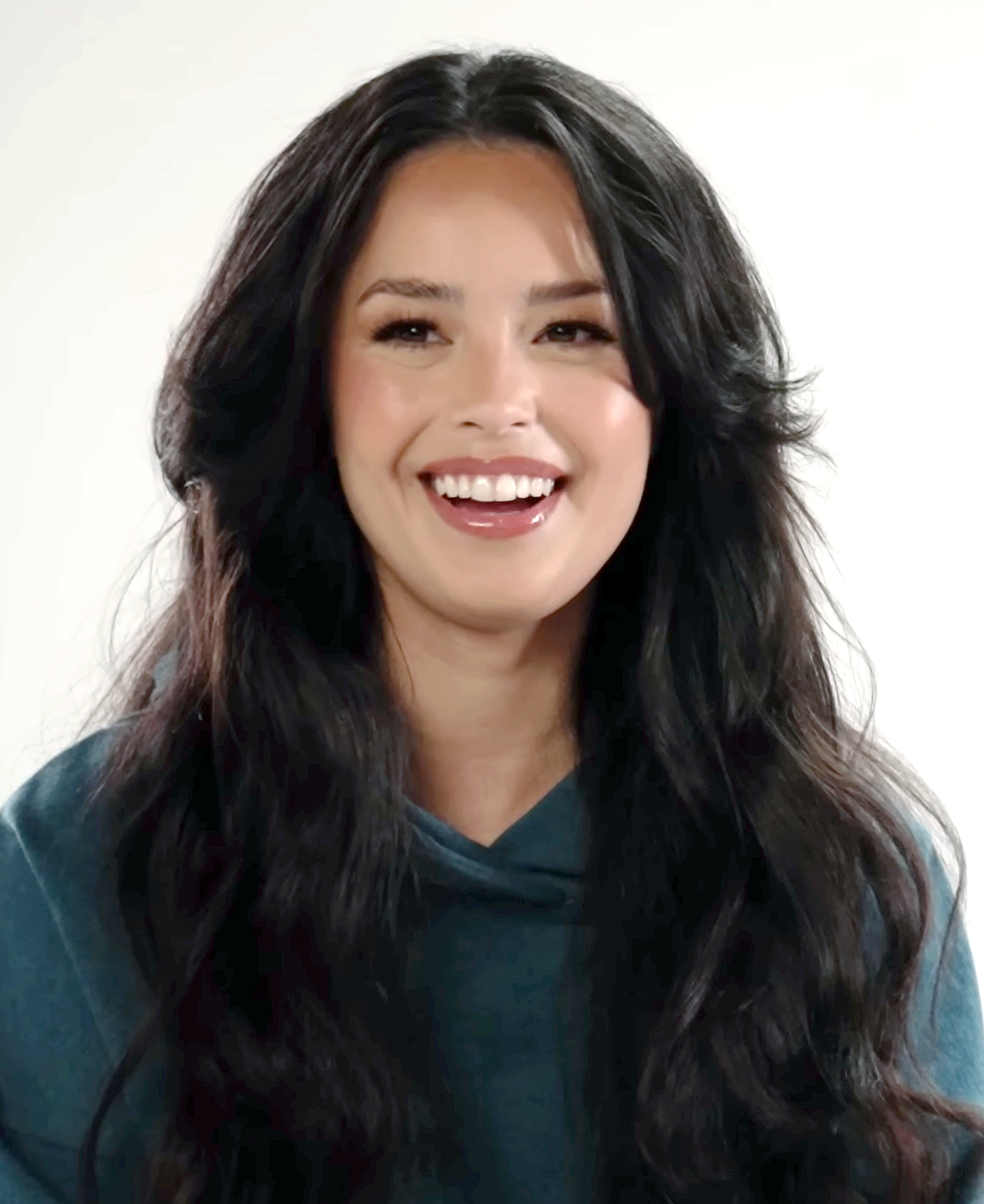
Valkyrae hosted the show

The 2022 Streamer Awards (Note: Was referred to as the 2023 Streamer Awards when airing. Name was changed after the 2024 Streamer Awards.) was the second edition of The Streamer Awards honoring the best in live streaming in 2022. The ceremony was held at the Wiltern Theatre in Los Angeles, California, on March 11, 2023. It was hosted by showrunner QTCinderella and fellow streamer Valkyrae.

The show was presented by, and exclusively streaming on, Twitch. The event was also sponsored by AT&T, Spotify, Fansly, Nitro Stream Racing, Mountain Dew, and KFC.

Streamers were interviewed on the red carpet by Ludwig Ahgren, Hasan Piker, Squeex, and Sweet Anita.

The show peaked at 580,159 live concurrent viewers across all seventy-two Twitch channels that were streaming the awards.

== Performers ==
The 2022 Streamer Awards featured musical performances from

Performers at the 2022 Streamer Awards
| Artist(s) | Song(s) |
|---|---|
| Nicki Taylor | "Worlds Collide" |
| Charming Jo | "Take Me Home, Country Roads" "What's Up" |
| Yung Gravy | "Betty (Get Money)" |

== Winners and nominees ==
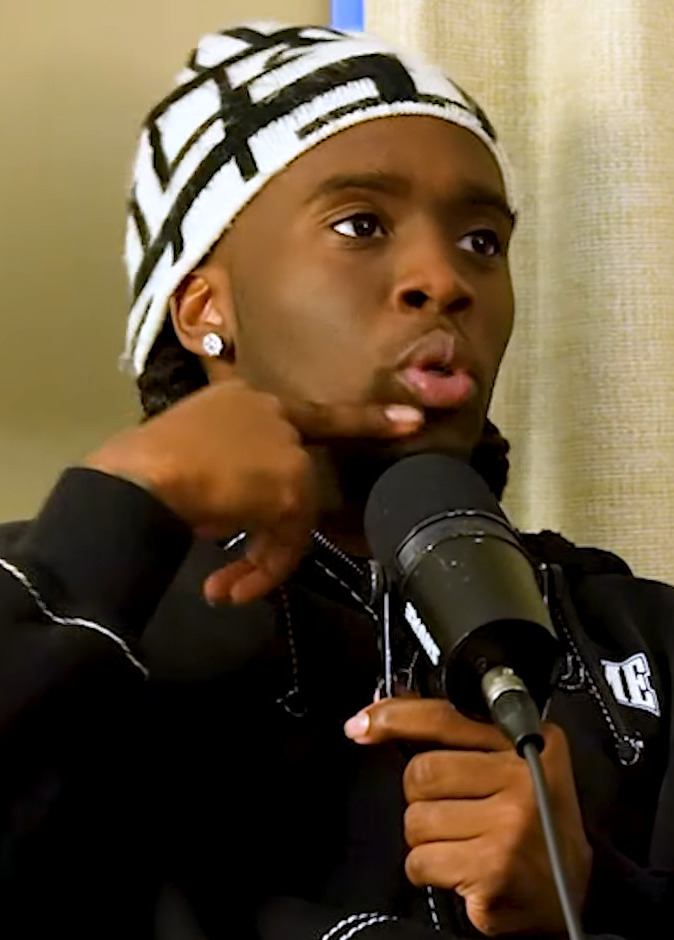
Kai Cenat, winner of the Streamer of the Year award

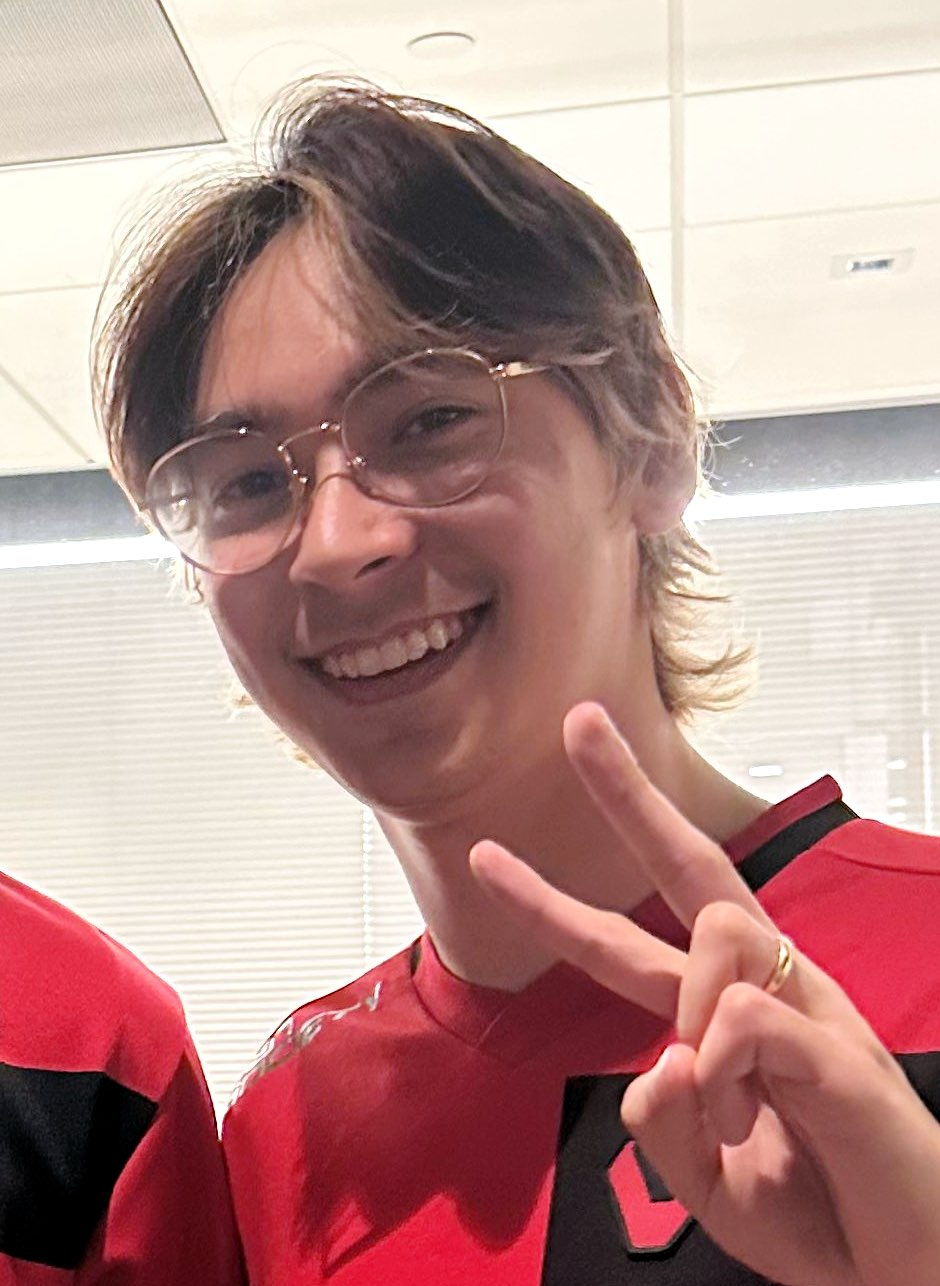
TenZ, winner of the Gamer of the Year award

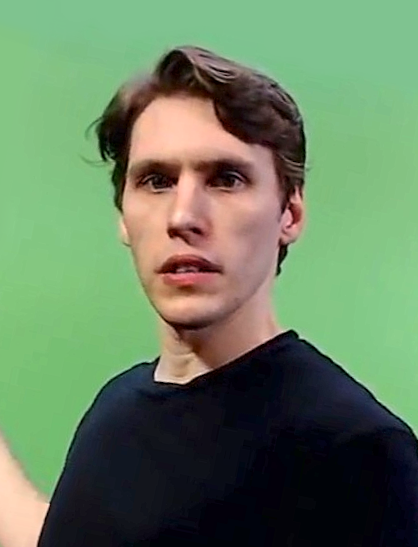
Jerma985, winner of the Legacy award

Streamers were nominated and voted for by their fans, besides the Legacy Award and the Streamer's Streamer Award, which were voted on by the Streamer Awards panel and audience respectively.

Winners are listed first and in boldface.

| **Best Battle Royale Streamer**: **iiTzTimmy**; Apricot; Clix; Nadia; Symfuhny | **Best MMORPG Streamer**: **Asmongold**; B0aty; EsfandTV; Maximum |
| **Best Role-Play Streamer**: **Fanum**; buddha; Fuslie; Zerkaa | **Best FPS Streamer**: **aceu**; Flats; Scump; Summit1g; supertf |
| **Best Soulslike Streamer**: **MissMikkaa**; Distortion2; LilAggy; LobosJr | **Best Chess Streamer**: **GothamChess**; Anna Cramling; BotezLive; GMHikaru |
| **Best Strategy Game Streamer**: **boxbox**; Dkayed; Gorgc; k3soju; Scarra | **Best Speedrun Streamer**: **PointCrow**; Simply; Squeex; Wirtual |
| **Best Art Streamer**: **MeatCanyon**; DyaRikku; Neonbeat; RubberRoss | **Best VTuber**: **Ironmouse**; shxtou; Shylily; veibae |
| **Best Music Streamer**: **TPAIN**; Chrisnxtdoor; hakumai; The8BitDrummer | **Best IRL Streamer**: **jakenbakeLIVE**; ExtraEmily; fanfan; Jinnytty; JoeyKaotyk |
| **Best League of Legends Streamer**: **loltyler1**; Caedrel; Dantes; Thebausffs | **Best Minecraft Streamer**: **Quackity**; Foolish_Gamers; SmallAnt; Tubbo |
| **Best Valorant Streamer**: **Kyedae**; QuarterJade; ShahZaM; tarik | **Hidden Gem Award**: **KingSammelot**; Avghans; HelloNeptune; Nixolay |
| **Best Philanthropic Stream Event**: **500 Mile Cyclethon – CDawgVA**; Build Against Cancer – DrLupo; Holiday Charity Week – Roomies; Thankmas – jacksepticeye | **Stream Game of the Year**: **Elden Ring**; God of War Ragnarök; Minecraft; Valorant |
| **Best Variety Streamer**: **xQc**; 39daph; CDawgVA; erobb221; Im_Dontai | **Best Just Chatting Streamer**: **HasanAbi**; Ironmouse; PaymoneyWubby; yourragegaming |
| **Best Streamed Event**: **Mogul Chessboxing Championship – Ludwig**; Camp Knut – Knut; Jerma Baseball Stream – Jerma985; PointCrow Party – PointCrow | **Best Content Organization**: **OfflineTV**; 100 Thieves; OTK Network; VShojo |
| **Rising Star Award**: **frogan**; Alluux; Keeoh; PrinceZamLIVE | **League of Their Own**: **DougDoug**; Ludwig; Nmplol; WillNeff |
| **Streamer's Streamer Award**: **PaymoneyWubby** | **Legacy Award**: **Jerma985** |
| **Gamer of the Year**: **TenZ**; aceu; iiTzTimmy; tarik | **Streamer of the Year**: **Kai Cenat**; HasanAbi; Jerma985; xQc |

== Fansly controversy ==
This edition of the awards were sponsored by Fansly, a subscription-based social media platform similar to OnlyFans which is mainly used to distribute pornography. An advertisement for the platform was played multiple times throughout the show, which caused some uproar within viewers. Some said that the ads were promoting adult content to children, while others were criticizing the lack of age-verification on the platform.

QTCinderella's husband, Ludwig Ahgren, who had also taken Fansly sponsorships in the past, would respond to the controversy by stating "I don't cater my content directly towards kids. I do a lot of gambling, I do a lot of drinking, I do a lot of swearing. I wouldn't say that if you're a kid, I'm necessarily a channel you should watch."

In the third edition of the awards the following year, QTCinderella would reference the controversy in her opening monologue stating: "Last year I was accused of selling porn to children after taking a Fansly sponsorship. So to avoid the same accusations this year, I had to turn down some sponsorships."
