= ARIatHOME =

New York livestreaming musician

- Born: Ari Miller
- Genres: hip-hop, neo-soul, funk, house music, electronic music, europop
- Instruments: Portable DJ set and keyboard

Twitch information
- Channel: ariathome

YouTube information
- Channel: @ARIatHOME
- Born: Upstate New York, New York State, United States
- Parent: David Alan Miller

ARIatHOME, also spelled Ari@Home, is the stage name for Ari Miller, an American improvisational music DJ. He performs hip-hop, neo-soul, funk, and house music beats.

== DJ style ==
Ari wears a portable DJ and beat-making set that he custom built on his own. It weighs 50lbs, and he wears it with an adapted backpack-style strap. He can create drum, keyboard, and bass interfaced with Ableton through a Mac Mini and portable monitor touchpads. He mostly entertains on the streets of New York City, but also in many other cities around the world, where he walks around and finds complete strangers to use his microphone. From the impromptu sessions with strangers, he creates unique music, and uploads that content to the internet.

Ari also performs with other professional musicians that he meets through his work. He has performed with Beardyman, Marc Rebillet, Wyclef Jean, Døvydas, iNTeLL, INK, and Harry Mack, among others.

== Biography ==
Ari grew up around the area of Albany, New York. His father is the famous orchestral conductor David Alan Miller. Ari's brother is also an orchestral conductor, and would perform great pieces on the piano at his childhood home. Ari was less interested in the orchestra, and wanted to learn music production.

Ari enrolled in college to study literature.

Ari taught himself music production and electronic music. He started performing live, but the COVID-19 pandemic interrupted that. During the COVID era, he began streaming on the livestreaming platform Twitch.tv. After lockdown, in 2020, Ari moved to Brooklyn, still performing as a bedroom beatmaker, but he had developed cabin fever. At TwitchCon, Ari met Yuggie_TV, JinnyTTY, and JayStreazy. Those creators, among others, explained to him the concept of a streaming backpack and IRL streaming. He experimented with the concept.

In 2023, Ari performed his first outdoor livestream using a streaming camera mounted on a pole, inspired by Zach Sabri (Suat). In September 2024, Ari stopped filming himself and hired a videographer named Dylan Groucher. He quickly gained more than a million followers on most platforms, and over 100,000 on Twitch.

== Awards ==
Year	Ceremony	Category	Result	Ref.
2021	The Streamer Awards	Best Music Streamer	Nominated	
2023	The Streamer Awards	Best Creative Arts Streamer	Nominated	
2025	The Streamer Awards	Best Music Streamer	Nominated	
2026	The Streamer Awards	Best Music Streamer	Won	
