= PogChamps =

Online amateur chess tournament

- Game: Chess
- Founded: 2020
- Owner: Chess.com
- Venue: Twitch (online)

PogChamps is a series of online amateur chess tournaments hosted by Chess.com. Players in the tournament are internet personalities, primarily Twitch streamers. The first four PogChamps tournaments took place over the course of two weeks, while the fifth iteration lasted four weeks. The first and second PogChamps had prize pools of $50,000 each, and later editions had prize pools of $100,000 each.

== Tournament history ==
The first PogChamps tournament was announced in late May 2020 by Chess.com. The games were played in the 10+5 Rapid Time control and all 16 players were streamers on Twitch. Running from June 5–19, the tournament was won by League of Legends streamer Voyboy. Coaching and commentary was provided primarily by Grandmaster (GM) Hikaru Nakamura and Woman FIDE Master (WFM) Alexandra Botez.

PogChamps 2 was announced on July 20, 2020 and was played from August 21 through September 6. Some players returned from the first tournament, while others, such as David Pakman and Hafþór Júlíus Björnsson, played in the tournament for the first time. PogChamps 2's lineup included some players who were not primarily Twitch streamers. This event featured a slightly different format, with two game matches in the group stage. Coaches included Nakamura and Botez, as well as GM Daniel Naroditsky, Woman Grandmaster (WGM) Qiyu Zhou, International Master (IM) Anna Rudolf and IM Levy Rozman. The tournament was ultimately won by World of Warcraft and Hearthstone streamer Hafu (itshafu).

PogChamps 3 was announced on January 11, 2021 and was played from February 14 through February 28. Notable contestants for the third event include streamers xQc (marking his third time participating), Ludwig and MoistCr1tikal (marking their second times participating), as well as Myth, Pokimane, and Neekolul; YouTubers MrBeast and Michelle Khare, rapper Logic, actor Rainn Wilson and poker player Daniel Negreanu. In the announcement article, Chess.com noted how previous PogChamps tournaments, as well as other external events such as the success of The Queen's Gambit on Netflix, had led to a dramatic increase in the number of site registrations and daily games played, allowing them to gain several sponsorships for the third iteration of the series, which in turn led to an increased prize pool of $100,000. The tournament was won by French streamer Sardoche.

PogChamps 4 was announced in a video via Chess.com's official Twitter account on July 6, 2021 to be played beginning on August 29. Sponsored by cryptocurrency marketplace Coinbase, the fourth iteration of the tournament has a $100,000 prize pool, with Chess.com matching up to $100,000 additionally for charity. In a Chess.com stream of the FIDE World Cup, Daniel Naroditsky confirmed that previous PogChamps participants MrBeast and Ludwig would return. This information was further corroborated by an article announcing that in addition to MrBeast and Ludwig returning, notable Spanish streamer Rubius would return as well for the fourth iteration of the event. The tournament was won by Dutch streamer Fundy.

PogChamps 5 was announced on June 29, 2023 from a Chess.com announcement video on YouTube. The event began on July 26. For the first time, the event featured over-the-board play. Only the finals were over-the-board, which were held as best of four matches in Los Angeles on August 18. Voice actor and streamer CDawgVA won the tournament.

PogChamps 6 was announced on March 20, 2025 during a Chess.com broadcast. The event was played from April 29 to May 2, 2025 and was won by English international footballer Eberechi Eze.

PogChamps 6 7 was announced on April 7-8 on the Chess.com Announcements page. The event was played from April 10-11 and was won by streamer Jynxzi.

== Reception ==
Chess.com claimed that viewership for the first tournament exceeded its "ambitious estimates." Trent Murray of The Esports Observer commented that the number of hours of chess watched on Twitch increased in June 2020, the month in which the first PogChamps took place. Viewership increased especially after video of MoistCr1tikal checkmating xQc within 6 moves went viral. David Llada, Chief Marketing and Communications Officer for FIDE, said that the competition "demonstrates that chess can be fun from minute one."

The reaction to PogChamps from the Chess community has been mixed. While GMs Hikaru Nakamura, Daniel Naroditsky, and Robert Hess; IMs Anna Rudolf, Levy "GothamChess" Rozman, and Daniel Rensch; WGM Zhou; and WFMs Botez and Anna Cramling have all supported PogChamps by coaching players and providing commentary for the matches, a few others have been critical of its popularity and growth. In February 2021, GM Ian Nepomniachtchi tweeted saying PogChamps 3 is promoted "as a popcorn stuff" and "is replacing and displacing any real chess content". GM Magnus Carlsen has called PogChamps a "good initiative" and tweeted that "[PogChamps 3] is doing a great job in [bringing] chess to more people." GM Anish Giri responded tweeting that he is "in a complete agreement [with Magnus Carlsen] for once."

Nepomniachtchi later clarified saying that he is "obviously happy more and more people are getting involved into chess." He voiced his concern saying the "indisputable success of Chess.com Pogchamps might set a new standard of a chess show" and he "can’t be sure it won’t prevail over other formats." In the twitter post he also mentioned that he had previously contributed to PogChamps by coaching PogChamps 2 winner itsHafu. Nakamura has shared his perspective on multiple occasions, supporting the tournament saying that "anything that brings chess to a bigger audience, anything where people can get into the game (and) understand it, is always going to be helpful for growing the game without a doubt."

== Event results ==
=== Overview ===
#	Year	Champion	Score	Runner-up
1	2020	Voyboy	2.0–1.0	Hutch
2	2020	(United States) itsHafu	2.0–0.0	Gripex90
3	2021	Sardoche	2.0–1.0	(United States) RainnWilson
4	2021	Fundy	2.0–1.0	crokeyz
5	2023	(Wales) CDawgVA	3.0–1.0	Franks-is-heres
6	2025	(England) Eberechi Eze	2.0–0.0	(United States) Sapnap
-	2025	(India) Samay Raina	2.0–0.0	Sardoche
7	2026	(United States) Jynxzi	2.0–0.0	(Germany) ohnePixel

=== PogChamps 1 ===
Group Stage

Group stage play in the inaugural PogChamps was a single game against each opponent.

Group A
	Player	1	2	3	4	Total
1	Voyboy		1	1	0	2
2	NateHill	0		½	1	1½
3	fuslie	0	½		1	1½
4	erobb221	1	0	0		1

Group B
	Player	1	2	3	4	Total
1	Hutch		1	1	1	3
2	Yassuo	0		1	1	2
3	moistcr1tikal	0	0		1	1
4	xQcOW	0	0	0		0

Group C
	Player	1	2	3	4	Total
1	NymN		1	1	1	3
2	forsen	0		1	1	2
3	ItsSlikeR	0	0		1	1
4	xChocoBars	0	0	0		0

Group D
	Player	1	2	3	4	Total
1	boxbox		1	1	1	3
2	Papaplatte	0		1	1	2
3	ludwig	0	0		1	1
4	Swiftor	0	0	0		0

Championship bracket

Quarterfinals
Voyboy	2.0
Yassuo	0.0
boxbox	2.0
forsen	1.0
NymN	2.0
Papaplatte	0.0
Hutch	2.0
NateHill	0.0

Semifinals
Voyboy	2.0
boxbox	0.0
NymN	1.0
Hutch	2.0

Final
Voyboy	2.0
Hutch	1.0

Consolation bracket

Quarterfinals
fuslie	0.5
xQcOW	1.5
ludwig	2.0
xChocoBars	0.0
ItsSlikeR	1.0
Swiftor	0.0
moistcr1tikal	2.0
erobb221	0.0

Semifinals
xQcOW	1.0
ludwig	2.0
ItsSlikeR	1.0
moistcr1tikal	2.0

Final
ludwig	1.0
moistcr1tikal	2.0

=== PogChamps 2 ===
Group Stage

Beginning with PogChamps 2, group stage play went to a new format consisting of two-game matches against each opponent. 3 points were awarded for winning a match outright and 2 points were awarded for winning a match via a tiebreaker game. The loser of the tiebreaker game would receive 1 point.

Group A
	Player	1	2	3	4	Total
1	Gripex90		3	2	3	8
2	forsen	0		3	3	6
3	Cizzorz	1	0		3	4
4	CallMeCarsonLIVE	0	0	0		0

Group B
	Player	1	2	3	4	Total
1	itsHafu		3	3	3	9
2	DavidPakman	0		3	3	6
3	easywithaces	0	0		3	3
4	xQcOW	0	0	0		0

Group C
	Player	1	2	3	4	Total
1	TFBlade		0	3	3	6
2	dogdog	3		1	2	6
3	TSM_ZexRow	0	2		3	5
4	QTCinderella	0	1	0		1

Group D
	Player	1	2	3	4	Total
1	WagamamaTV		3	3	3	9
2	Hafthorjulius	0		3	3	6
3	ConnorEatsPants	0	0		3	3
4	AustinShow	0	0	0		0

Championship bracket

Quarterfinals
Gripex90	2.0
DavidPakman	0.0
WagamamaTV	1.0
dogdog	2.0
TFBlade	2.0
Hafthorjulius	1.0
itsHafu	2.0
forsen	0.0

Semifinals
Gripex90	2.0
dogdog	1.0
TFBlade	0.0
itsHafu	2.0

Final
Gripex90	0.0
itsHafu	2.0

Consolation bracket

Quarterfinals
Cizzorz	2.5
xQcOW	1.5
ConnorEatsPants	1.0
QTCinderella	2.0
TSM_ZexRow	2.0
AustinShow	0.0
easywithaces	2.0
CallMeCarsonLIVE	0.0

Semifinals
Cizzorz	2.0
QTCinderella	0.0
TSM_ZexRow	0.5
easywithaces	1.5

Final
Cizzorz	0.0
easywithaces	2.0

=== PogChamps 3 ===
Group Stage

Group A
	Player	1	2	3	4	Total
1	benjyfishy		3	3	3	9
2	Sardoche	0		3	3	6
3	Neeko	0	0		3	3
4	Myth	0	0	0		0

Group B
	Player	1	2	3	4	Total
1	xQcOW		3	3	3	9
2	dnegspoker	0		3	3	6
3	pokimane	0	0		3	3
4	Rubius	0	0	0		0

Group C
	Player	1	2	3	4	Total
1	RainnWilson		2	3	2	7
2	logic	1		3	3	7
3	Tubbo	0	0		3	3
4	MichelleKhare	1	0	0		1

Group D
	Player	1	2	3	4	Total
1	ludwig		2	3	3	8
2	moistcr1tikal	1		3	3	7
3	MrBeast6000	0	0		3	3
4	CodeMiko	0	0	0		0

Championship bracket

Quarterfinals
benjyfishy	2.0
dnegspoker	1.0
RainnWilson	1.5
moistcr1tikal	0.5
ludwig	2.0
logic	1.0
xQcOW	0.0
Sardoche	2.0

Semifinals
benjyfishy	0.5
RainnWilson	1.5
ludwig	1.0
Sardoche	2.0

Final
RainnWilson	1.0
Sardoche	2.0

Consolation bracket

Quarterfinals
Neeko	2.0
Rubius	1.0
Tubbo	2.0
CodeMiko	0.0
MrBeast6000	0.0
MichelleKhare	2.0
pokimane	2.0
Myth	0.0

Semifinals
Neeko	2.0
Tubbo	1.0
MichelleKhare	2.0
pokimane	0.0

Final
Neeko	2.0
MichelleKhare	0.0

=== PogChamps 4 ===
Group Stage

Group A
	Player	1	2	3	4	Pts
1	5uppp		2	3	3	8
2	Ludwig	1		2	3	6
3	MrBeast	0	1		3	4
4	jakenbakeLIVE	0	0	0		0

Group B
	Player	1	2	3	4	Pts
1	boxbox		3	3	3	9
2	Sapnap	0		3	3	6
3	JustaMinx	0	0		3	3
4	harrymackofficial	0	0	0		0

Group C
	Player	1	2	3	4	Pts
1	Fundy		3	3	3	9
2	QTCinderella	0		3	2	5
3	Tectone	0	0		3	3
4	NickEh30	0	1	0		1

Group D
	Player	1	2	3	4	Pts
1	crokeyz		3	3	3	9
2	IamCristinini	0		3	3	6
3	Rubius	0	0		3	3
4	Punz	0	0	0		0

Championship bracket

Quarterfinals
5uppp	2.0
Sapnap	0.0
IamCristinini	0.0
Fundy	2.0
Ludwig	0.5
boxbox	1.5
crokeyz	2.0
QTCinderella	0.0

Semifinals
5uppp	0.0
Fundy	2.0
boxbox	1.0
crokeyz	2.0

Final
Fundy	2.0
crokeyz	1.0

Consolation bracket

Quarterfinals
harrymackofficial	0.5
MrBeast	1.5
Punz	0.0*
Tectone	2.0*
jakenbakeLIVE	2.0
JustaMinx	0.0
Rubius	2.0
NickEh30	0.0

Semifinals
MrBeast	2.0
Tectone	0.0
jakenbakeLIVE	0.5
Rubius	1.5

Final
MrBeast	2.0
Rubius	1.0

* Punz loss on forfeit. Win awarded to Tectone by default.

=== PogChamps 5 ===
Group Stage

Group A
	Player	1	2	3	4	Pts
1	CDawgVA		3	2	3	8
2	Franks-is-heres	0		3	2	5
3	Jarvis	1	0		3	4
4	Sykkuno	0	1	0		1

Group B
	Player	1	2	3	4	Pts
1	Ghastly		2	2	3	7
2	Sapnap	1		2	3	6
3	Wirtual	1	1		3	5
4	Daily Dose of Internet	0	0	0		0

Group C
	Player	1	2	3	4	Pts
1	xQc		3	3	3	9
2	Tyler1	0		2	3	5
3	Squeex	0	1		3	4
4	Jinnytty	0	0	0		0

Group D
	Player	1	2	3	4	Pts
1	I did a thing		1	3	3	7
2	Papaplatte	2		1	3	6
3	QTCinderella	0	2		2	4
4	Fuslie	0	0	1		1

Championship bracket

Quarterfinals
CDawgVA	2.0
Sapnap	1.0
I did a thing	2.0
Tyler1	0.0
Ghastly	1.0
Franks-is-heres	2.0
xQc	2.5
Papaplatte	1.5

Semifinals
CDawgVA	2.0
I did a thing	0.0
Franks-is-heres	2.0
xQc	0.0

Final
CDawgVA	3.0
Franks-is-heres	1.0

Consolation bracket

Quarterfinals
Jarvis	0.0
Daily Dose of Internet	2.0
QTCinderella	2.0
Jinnytty	0.0
Wirtual	2.0
Sykkuno	0.0
Squeex	2.0
Fuslie	0.0

Semifinals
Daily Dose of Internet	0.0
QTCinderella	2.0
Wirtual	2.0
Squeex	0.0

Final
QTCinderella	0.0
Wirtual	3.0

=== PogChamps 6 ===
Group Stage

Group A
	Player	1	2	3	4	5	6	Pts
1	Eberechi Eze		2	2	2	3	3	12
2	Sambucha	1		2	3	3	3	12
3	Inoxtag	1	1		3	3	3	11
4	Mongraal	1	0	0		3	3	7
5	LydiaViolet	0	0	0	0		3	3
6	Linzor	0	0	0	0	0		0

Group B
	Player	1	2	3	4	5	6	Pts
1	WolfeyVGC		3	3	3	3*	3	15
2	Stephen Nedoroscik	0		3	3	3	3	12
3	Sapnap	0	0		3	2	2	7
4	Filian	0	0	0		2	3	5
5	DrLupo	0*	0	1	1		3	5
6	Hungrybox	0	0	1	0	0	1	1

* DrLupo won the match 2-0, but was disqualified from the tournament for cheating using a chess engine.

Championship bracket

Quarterfinals
Stephen Nedoroscik	2.0
Inoxtag	1.0
Sambucha	0.0
Sapnap	2.0

Semifinals
Eberechi Eze	2.0
Stephen Nedoroscik	0.0
WolfeyVGC	1.0
Sapnap	2.0

Finals
Eberechi Eze	2.0
Sapnap	0.0

Consolation bracket

Quarterfinals
Hungrybox	1.0
Linzor	2.0
LydiaViolet	1.5
Macaiyla*	0.5

Semifinals
Mongraal	2.0
Linzor	0.0
Filian	0.0
LydiaViolet	2.0

Finals
Mongraal	2.0
LydiaViolet	0.0

* Entered the consolation bracket in place of the disqualified DrLupo.
