= Tubbo =

British Twitch streamer and YouTuber (born 2003)

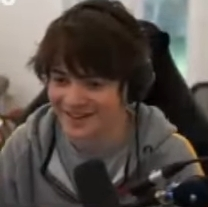
- Smith in 2021
- Born: Tobias James Smith; 23 December 2003 (age 22); Chichester, West Sussex, England
- Other name: Toby Smith
- Occupations: Twitch streamer; YouTuber

Twitch information
- Channel: Tubbo
- Years active: 2018–present
- Genres: Gaming; Reaction; IRL
- Games: Minecraft; Five Nights at Freddy's; Counter-Strike: Global Offensive
- Followers: 5.2 million

YouTube information
- Channel: Tubbo
- Subscribers: 2.68 million
- Views: 78.34 million
- Last updated: 21 July 2026

Tobias James Smith (born 23 December 2003), known online as Tubbo, is a British online streamer and YouTuber. His content focuses primarily on the video game Minecraft. He is known for his time on the Dream SMP, an invitation-only survival multiplayer (SMP) Minecraft server. As of July 2026, he has 5.2 million followers on Twitch, making him its 48th-most-followed streamer. He was nominated for Best Minecraft streamer at the Streamer Awards in 2021, 2022, 2023 and 2025.

== Early and personal life ==
Tobias James Smith was born on 23 December 2003 in Chichester General Hospital, Chichester, West Sussex. He lived in Bognor Regis, West Sussex, before moving to Brighton.

== Career ==
=== 2018–2020: Early career ===
Smith created his Twitch account, "Tubbo", in 2018. He created his YouTube account in 2018, and mostly uploaded Minecraft content.

He started his career playing Counter Strike: Global Offensive before realising the interactive potential of Minecraft's multiplayer servers. He had played the game since its beta version, after discovering it on a friend's family computer. Smith found himself drawn to Twitch for a challenge, telling TheGamer that when compared to other options, Twitch seemed like it had "more to figure out".

=== 2020–present: Rise to popularity and Dream SMP ===
Smith's popularity grew significantly after joining the Dream SMP, an invite-only Minecraft survival multiplayer (SMP) server, in 2020. He quickly became a key character on the server, often collaborating with fellow-streamers like TommyInnit and Dream, the server's owner.

On 12 October 2020, Smith first participated in MC Championship, he has since played over forty times and has won once, teaming with Sylvee, Smajor and Sapnap.

In February 2021, Smith participated in PogChamps 3, an online chess tournament for content creators hosted by Chess.com, reaching the semifinals of the consolation bracket before losing to his fellow-streamer Neekolul.

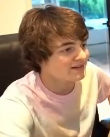
Smith in November 2021

In October 2021, Smith appeared in the Twitch leaks, which disclosed the top Twitch streamers' revenue from August 2019 to October 2021. Smith placed 81st on the list, with a reported payout of US$1,000,504.31 for this time period. According to Unikrn, Smith was the fourth fastest-growing streamer in 2021, gaining over 1.5 million followers on Twitch. Vulture reported that Smith was one of the top streamers for Five Nights at Freddy's in 2021, generating approximately 273,000 hours of collective viewership for the game.

In February 2022, Smith joined Misfits Gaming, an American esports organisation, as a Minecraft content creator. On 12 March 2022, Smith was nominated for Best Minecraft Streamer at the 2021 Streamer Awards.

On 1 March 2023, Smith began a subathon called the "Tubbathon 2", where he streamed continuously until the timer, which a viewer could add to by donating or subscribing, ran out. Later that month he was nominated for Best Minecraft Streamer at the 2022 Streamer Awards. On 26 December 2023, he announced his departure from Misfits Gaming starting in 2024.

On 17 February 2024, Smith was nominated for Best Minecraft Streamer at the 2023 Streamer Awards. Later on 1 March 2024, he began "Tubbathon 3". Compared to the previous Tubbathon, it included cooking shows, Dungeons & Dragons sessions, panel shows and games. The event ended after 64 days, beating the previous year's record of 27 days.

On 7 July 2024, Smith received a ban from Twitch for violating the United States Digital Millennium Copyright Act after live streaming the Formula One British Grand Prix.

In late 2024, he began a fantasy-themed SMP server named The Realm SMP, which features around 30 other streamers, all roleplaying as wizards and other fantasy characters.

In May 2026, Tubbo organised a speedrunning tournament called the Midoffs Live in the Minecraft Live May 2026 event.

== Other ventures ==
=== TubNet ===
On 25 November 2022, Smith launched TubNet, a Minecraft server where players were able to partake in various activities, including aspects like competition mini-games or changing cosmetics, with Misfits Gaming as one of the company's investors. The server was supposed to open in August, but the team at TubNet postponed the launch until November to improve its data security protections. On 8 January 2024, TubNet announced on Twitter that the server would be on hiatus from 12 January 2024.

=== Music ===
On 27 August 2021, Smith released a song called "Life by the Sea" featuring CG5. The song later charted in the UK Official Charts at number 84.

== Charity ==
In September 2021, Smith participated in a charity livestream fundraising event organised by the streamer and YouTuber Technoblade. Smith appeared as one of the "hunters" chasing Technoblade in Minecraft. They managed to raise more than $324,000 for the Sarcoma Foundation of America.

In June 2022, Smith participated in a Minecraft charity tournament held by the MC Championship called MCC Pride with several other online creators. The event managed to raise over $145,000 for the Trevor Project.

In December 2024, Smith participated in Jingle Jam, a livestreamed charity event held by Yogscast where 1000 streamers and content creators joined forces to raise cash for eight charities.

== Discography ==
=== Singles ===
List of singles, with selected peak chart positions
Title	Year	Peak chart positions	Album
Title	Year	UK	Album
"Life by the Sea" (featuring CG5)	2021	84	Non-album singles
"New York, Newer York" (featuring Badlinu)	2024	—	Non-album singles

== Awards and nominations ==
Ceremony	Year	Category	Result	Ref.
The Streamer Awards	2021	Best Minecraft Streamer	Nominated	
The Streamer Awards	2022	Best Minecraft Streamer	Nominated	
The Streamer Awards	2023	Best Minecraft Streamer	Nominated	
The Streamer Awards	2025	Best Minecraft Streamer	Won	
Crafty Awards	2025	Midmaster	Won	
