= Robert Hess (chess player) =

American chess grandmaster (born 1991)

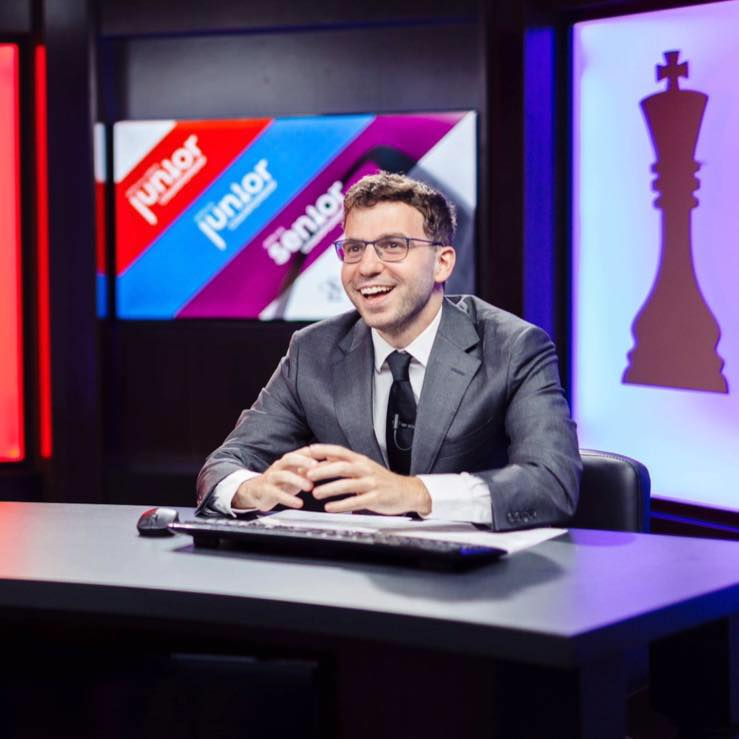
- Hess commentating the 2019 U.S. Junior Championships

Personal information
- Born: Robert Lee Hess; December 19, 1991 (age 34) Manhattan, New York, U.S.

Chess career
- Country: United States
- Title: Grandmaster (2009)
- FIDE rating: 2591 (July 2026)
- Peak rating: 2639 (July 2012)

Robert Lee Hess (born December 19, 1991) is an American chess player who received the FIDE title of Grandmaster (GM) in 2009. In May 2012, his FIDE rating was 2635, fifth in the United States. Hess is a commentator for Chess.com, covering events such as the World Chess Championship and Candidates Tournament. He also streams chess content on his Twitch channel GMHess, which has 73,000+ followers.

== Education ==
Hess attended the Browning School, a private all-boys preparatory school in Manhattan. He is a graduate of Stuyvesant High School in New York. In the 2007–08 school year, he was a sophomore and the co-captain of Stuyvesant's junior varsity football team, on which he was a starting linebacker.

After deferring a year to play chess, Hess attended Yale University and graduated in 2015 with a degree in history. He became the co-founder and chief operating officer of The Sports Quotient, a now defunct sports blog.

== Chess playing career ==
The 2006 U.S. Junior Champion, Hess achieved his final norm for the International Master title at the 2007 Cannes Open, and was later awarded the title IM by FIDE.

Hess achieved his first grandmaster norm at the 2008 Foxwoods Open, held on April 19 through April 23 at the Foxwoods Resort in Mashantucket, Connecticut. He scored 7–2, tying for first with grandmasters Alexander Shabalov, Yury Shulman, Julio Becerra, and Alexander Ivanov. Hess won his first two games against masters, then played seven grandmasters, scoring four wins, two draws, and one loss. His performance rating for the tournament was approximately 2770 USCF. Chess journalist Jerry Hanken called Hess's achievement "one of the greatest performances by an American teenager since the heyday of Bobby Fischer!"

Hess obtained his second norm by winning the SPICE Spring Grandmaster Invitational in March 2009. The next month, he secured his third and final grandmaster norm in the Foxwoods Open, a performance which included an upset over Hikaru Nakamura. In 2009 Hess also won the K-12 SuperNationals tournaments.

In the 2009 US Chess Championship in May, Hess tied for second with Alexander Onischuk, with a score of +5 −1 =3, losing only to eventual winner Nakamura. He was on the silver-medal US team at the 2009 World Team Championships in Bursa, Turkey. Hess was awarded the 2010 Samford Fellowship "based on his chess talent, work ethic, dedication and accomplishments". He was also a member of the 2010 US Olympiad Team. In December 2011 he tied for first–second with Alexander Kovchan in the Groningen Chess Festival, defeating Evgeny Romanov and Sergei Tiviakov on his way to a 2702 performance rating.

Hess won Group B in the 2011 U.S. Championship with a score of 5.5/7, defeating former champions Alexander Onischuk, Alexander Shabalov, and Larry Christiansen, all with the black pieces.

Hess scored additional successes in the late 2010s. In 2017, he won the North American Open in Las Vegas. In 2018, he scored 5.5/9 at the Isle of Man Masters, drawing with former world champion Viswanathan Anand in the process. Hess’s most recent major chess event is the FIDE Grand Swiss Tournament 2019, where he scored 5.5/11 and defeated then-reigning U.S. Champion Sam Shankland.

== Other chess work ==
=== Coaching ===
Hess was the coach of the U.S. team at the 44th Chess Olympiad and also coached the U.S. women’s team at the 42nd and 43rd Chess Olympiads in 2016 and 2018. He was a second to Fabiano Caruana at the Chess World Cup 2021 in Sochi, Russia.

Additionally, Hess has coached PogChamps participants Ludwig Ahgren and Hafu. Hess and Ahgren together won the Twitch Rivals Hand & Brain Showdown in 2021.

=== Commentary ===
Hess is a longtime commentator for Chess.com and was on the call for the 2021 World Chess Championship along with Daniel Rensch and Fabiano Caruana. Hess has also commentated for the Chess.com Speed Chess Championship and Junior Speed Chess Championship, the Pro Chess League, the Chess.com Global Championship, and PogChamps, as well as done Chess.com commentary for major events such as Tata Steel.

Hess has appeared as a panelist at the MIT Sloan Sports Analytics Conference on occasions since 2019, discussing topics such as chess engines and lessons that chess can offer to other sports.

=== Charity ===
Hess is a longtime supporter of the Charity Chess Championship, which in 2017 raised over $20,000 for Band of Parents; in 2018 raised over $56,000 for ovarian cancer research at Mount Sinai Hospital, and in 2019 raised over $60,000 for pancreatic cancer research at Memorial Sloan Kettering Center.
