= 2023 Streamer Awards =

Live streaming awards ceremony

- Awarded for: Excellence in live streaming
- Sponsored by: AT&T, Streamlabs, HP Omen
- Date: February 17, 2024
- Location: Wiltern Theatre, Los Angeles, California
- Country: United States
- Hosted by: QTCinderella & Pokimane
- Preshow hosts: CDawgVA, ExtraEmily, & Will Neff
- Acts: Harry Mack, Chrisnxtdoor, Leviathan, & bbno$
- Most awards: Quackity, Jynxzi, Kai Cenat (2)
- Most nominations: Quackity, ExtraEmily, Kai Cenat, Jynxzi, CaseOh (3)

Streaming coverage
- Network: Twitch
- Runtime: 388 minutes
- Viewership: 645,166 peak viewers
- Directed by: QTCinderella

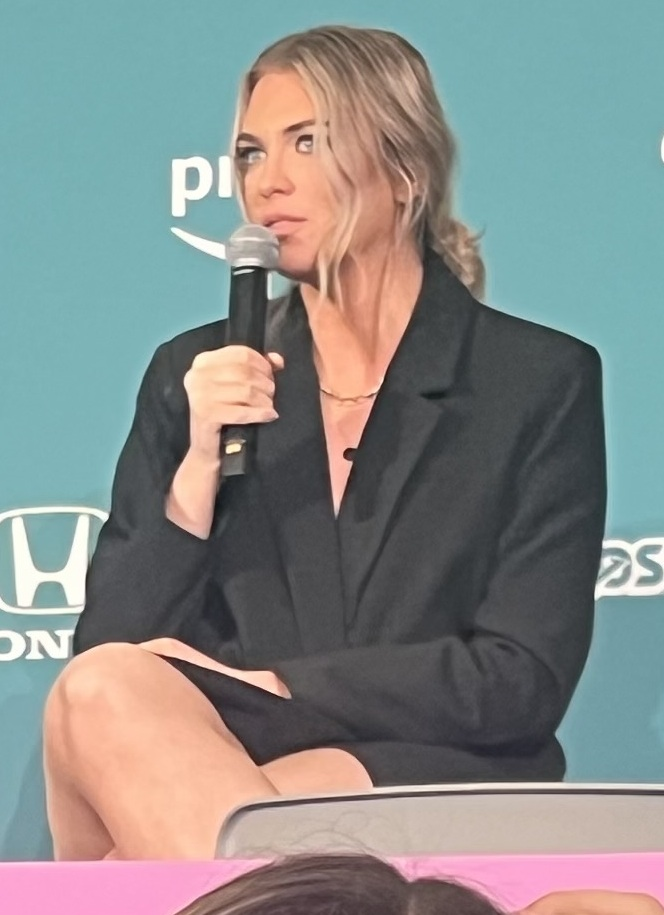
QTCinderella hosted the show

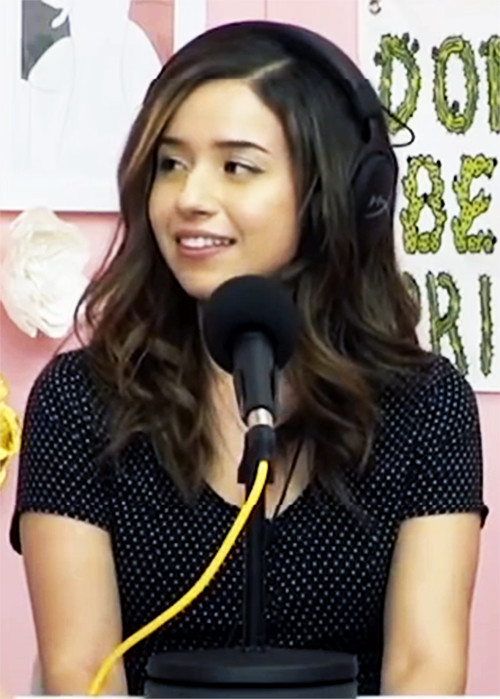
Pokimane co-hosted the show

The 2023 Streamer Awards (Note: Was referred to as the 2024 Streamer Awards when airing. Name was changed after the December 2024 Streamer Awards.) was the third edition of The Streamer Awards honoring the best in live streaming in 2023. The ceremony was held at the Wiltern Theatre in Los Angeles, California, on February 17, 2024. It was hosted by showrunner QTCinderella and fellow streamer Pokimane.

The red carpet was hosted by CDawgVA, ExtraEmily, and Will Neff. AustinShow would serve as the floor host during the show, while Prezoh would conduct interviews backstage with the winners which would be uploaded to the Patreon page for QTCinderella and Maya Higa's podcast, Wine About It.

This edition was partnered with Streamlabs, OMEN, AT&T, Fourthwall, Loaded and Offbrand, and sponsored by Marvel Snap, Chess.com, Enotria: The Last Song, Lunar Client, UnlimitedIRL, Honkai: Star Rail, Factor, Party Animals, FlyQuest, Twitch, Junkfood Custom Arcades, Feastables, Mad Mushroom, Nightingale and Patreon.

For this edition, eight new categories were added (Best Creative Arts Streamer, Best Software And Game Development Streamer, Best Fighting Games Streamer, Best Shared Channel, Best Streamed Series, Best International Streamer, Best Breakthrough Streamer, and The Sapphire Award), two were removed (Best Soulslike Streamer and Best Philanthropic Stream Event), and four were merged into existing or new categories (Best Art Streamer and Best Music Streamer merged into Best Creative Arts Streamer, Best League of Legends Streamer merged into Best Strategy Game Streamer, and Best VALORANT Streamer merged into Best FPS Streamer).

This was the first edition to be streamed on multiple platforms and had interactive features for viewers on Twitch, including "pickems".

This edition of the awards peaked at 645,166 live concurrent viewers across all platforms and channels, the most of any of the previous editions.

== Performers ==
The 2023 Streamer Awards featured musical performances from

Performers at the 2023 Streamer Awards
Artist(s)	Song(s)
Harry Mack	Freestyled song
Chrisnxtdoor	"Open Your Eyes"
Leviathan	"Chug Jug with You" "Fortnite Is Trash"
bbno$ (Note: Joined by Twitch CEO Dan Clancy on piano)	"Lalala" "edamame"

== Winners and nominees ==
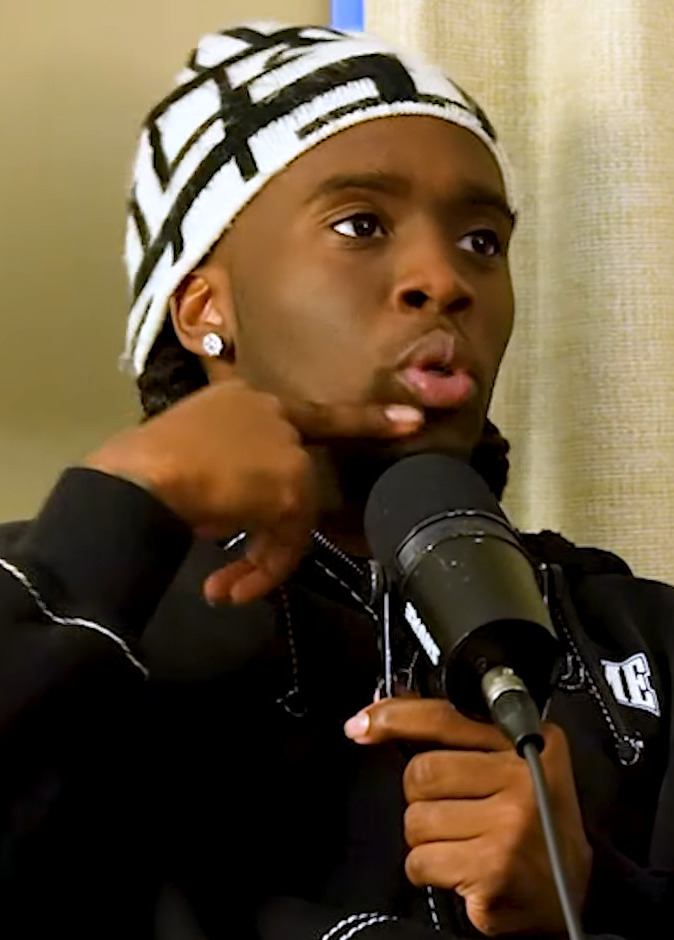
Kai Cenat, winner of the Streamer of the Year award

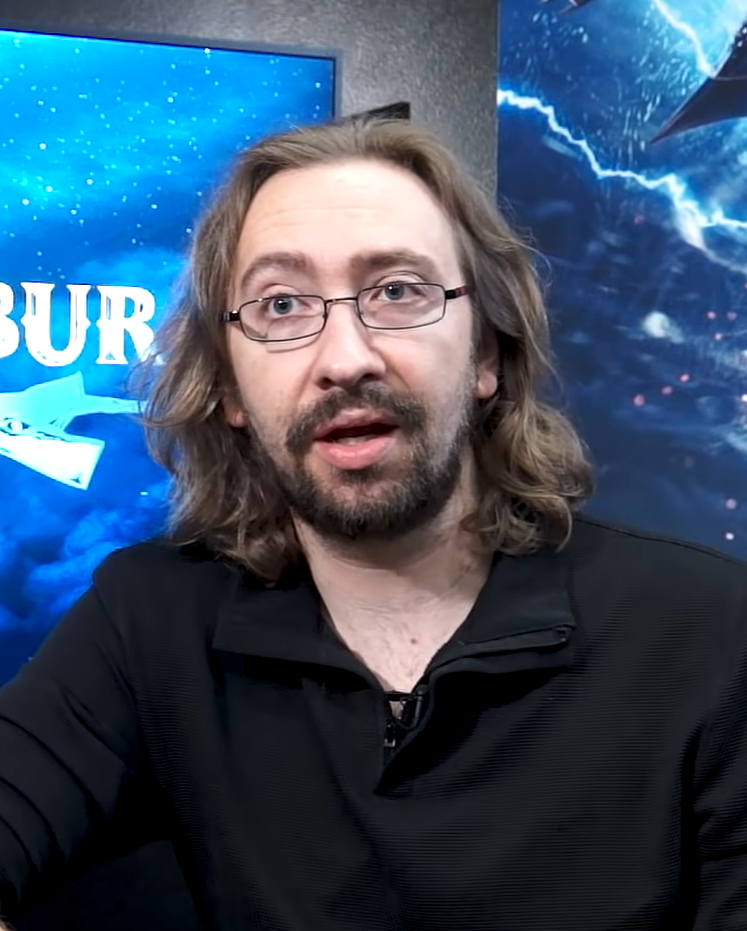
Maximilian Dood, winner of the Legacy award

Streamers were nominated and voted for by their fans, besides the Legacy Award and the Streamer's Streamer Award, which were voted on by the Streamer Awards panel and audience respectively.

Winners are listed first and in boldface.

**Best Creative Arts Streamer**: **RubberRoss**; ARIatHOME; OniGiri; triciaisabirdy	**Best MMORPG Streamer**: **Sodapoppin**; Asmongold; EsfandTV; Maximum
**Best Strategy Game Streamer**: **DisguisedToast**; BoxBox; Emilyywang; k3soju	**Best Chess Streamer**: **loltyler1**; AnnaCramling; BotezLive; GothamChess
**Best Software And Game Development Streamer**: **PirateSoftware**; DougDoug; CodeMiko; vedal987	**Best Fighting Games Streamer**: **Etoiles**; Hungrybox; Maximilian_DOOD; Sajam
**Best Speedrun Streamer**: **Wirtual**; Distortion2; Liam; Squeex	**Hidden Gem Award**: **EverythingNowShow**; GappyV; Lanaaamaee; SeanDaBlack
**Best Battle Royale Streamer**: **iiTzTimmy**; AsianJeff; NiceWigg; SypherPK	**Best FPS Streamer**: **tarik**; s0mcs; supertf; TenZ
**Rising Star Award**: **NoraExplorer**; chiblee; HansumFella; MARI	**Best Role-Play Streamer**: **Fanum**; Agent00; Lord_Kebun; omie
**Best Minecraft Streamer**: **Quackity**; Foolish; TinaKitten; Tubbo	**Best IRL Streamer**: **Jinnytty**; ExtraEmily; PapeSan; robcdee
**Stream Game of the Year**: **Lethal Company**; Baldur's Gate 3; GTA V; Only Up!	**Best Shared Channel**: **nmplol**; AlveusSanctuary; BotezLive; RDCgaming
**Best Content Organization**: **AMP**; OfflineTV; OTK Network; VShojo	**Best Streamed Series**: **Name Your Price - AustinShow & WillNeff**; Generation Loss: The Social Experiments - RanbooLive; Ordem Paranormal: Quarentena - Cellbit; Schooled - Mizkif
**Best Streamed Event**: **Creator Dodgeball World Championship - Ludwig**; 7 Days In - KaiCenat; The CDawgVA Charity Auction - CDawgVA; Wild West - Nmplol	**Best International Streamer**: **Quackity**; Cellbit; Etoiles; rivers_gg
**Best Breakthrough Streamer**: **Jynxzi**; CaseOh; plaqueboymax; Squeex	**Best VTuber**: **Ironmouse**; Filian; shxtou; vedal987
**Best Just Chatting Streamer**: **KaiCenat**; HasanAbi; PaymoneyWubby; WillNeff; YourRAGE	**Best Variety Streamer**: **CaseOh**; CDawgVA; Fuslie; Ludwig; xQc
**The Sapphire Award**: **Valkyrae**; Emiru; ExtraEmily; fanfan; LydiaViolet	**League of Their Own**: **ExtraEmily**; BigBossBoze; Cardboard_Cowboy; Hitch
**Streamer's Streamer Award**: **Liam**	**Legacy Award**: **Maximilian_DOOD**
**Gamer of the Year**: **Jynxzi**; Clix; Kyedae; Shroud; tarik	**Streamer of the Year**: **KaiCenat**; CaseOh; Ironmouse; Jynxzi; Quackity
