= Daniel Rensch =

American chess player (born 1985)

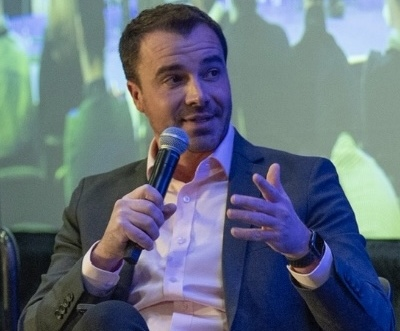
- Rensch in 2022

Personal information
- Born: Daniel Michael Rensch; October 10, 1985 (age 41) Phoenix, Arizona, U.S.

Chess career
- Country: United States
- Title: International Master (2009)
- FIDE rating: 2402 (November 2026)
- Peak rating: 2416 (September 2011)

Daniel Michael Rensch (born October 10, 1985) is an American chess international master, event organizer, lecturer, and commentator. He is a co-founder and the chief chess officer of Chess.com.

== Professional life ==
=== Chess career ===
Rensch won the 1998 Elementary National Championship before becoming Arizona's youngest National Master in 1999 (a record that was broken by Sandeep Sethuraman in 2019). After earning the title, Rensch won the 2000 Junior High National Championship in Tucson, Arizona. In 2004, Rensch tied for the National High School Championship, beating Aleksandr Lenderman, a future grandmaster, to win the title.

Rensch earned his first International Master (IM) norm in 2004 at the Foxwoods Open in Mashantucket, Connecticut. Backed by his strong performances, Rensch became the highest-rated 19-year-old in the United States that year. Rensch earned his second IM norm in the 2008 Berkeley International, after tying for a third-place finish with only one loss. In 2009, Rensch earned his final IM norm at Susan Polgar's SPICE Cup by drawing with Ray Robson, who went on to become the "youngest ever grandmaster in the United States".

Since 2012, Rensch has taken part in only two FIDE-registered tournaments: the 2015 Millionaire Chess Open II in Las Vegas, and the 2019 Denver Open where he tied for first place alongside Jesse Kraai.

=== Chess.com ===
Rensch has been offering chess analysis online since 2009. His "Rook Endgames: Beginner to Master" series, "Isolated Queen Pawns", and "Pawn Structure 101" series are among the most popular on Chess.com. In addition, his "Everything You Need to Know" video series, designed for beginners, has been viewed 1.7 million times.

Rensch has written instructive content for Chess.com's users. Some of his earliest contributions to Chess.com are among the site's most viewed articles.

Rensch is the "public face" of Chess.com as a spokesperson for the company. Notably, he has created video tutorials for using the site's features and hosts the quarterly "State of Chess.com" show, presenting the company's activities over its previous three months and its plans for the future.

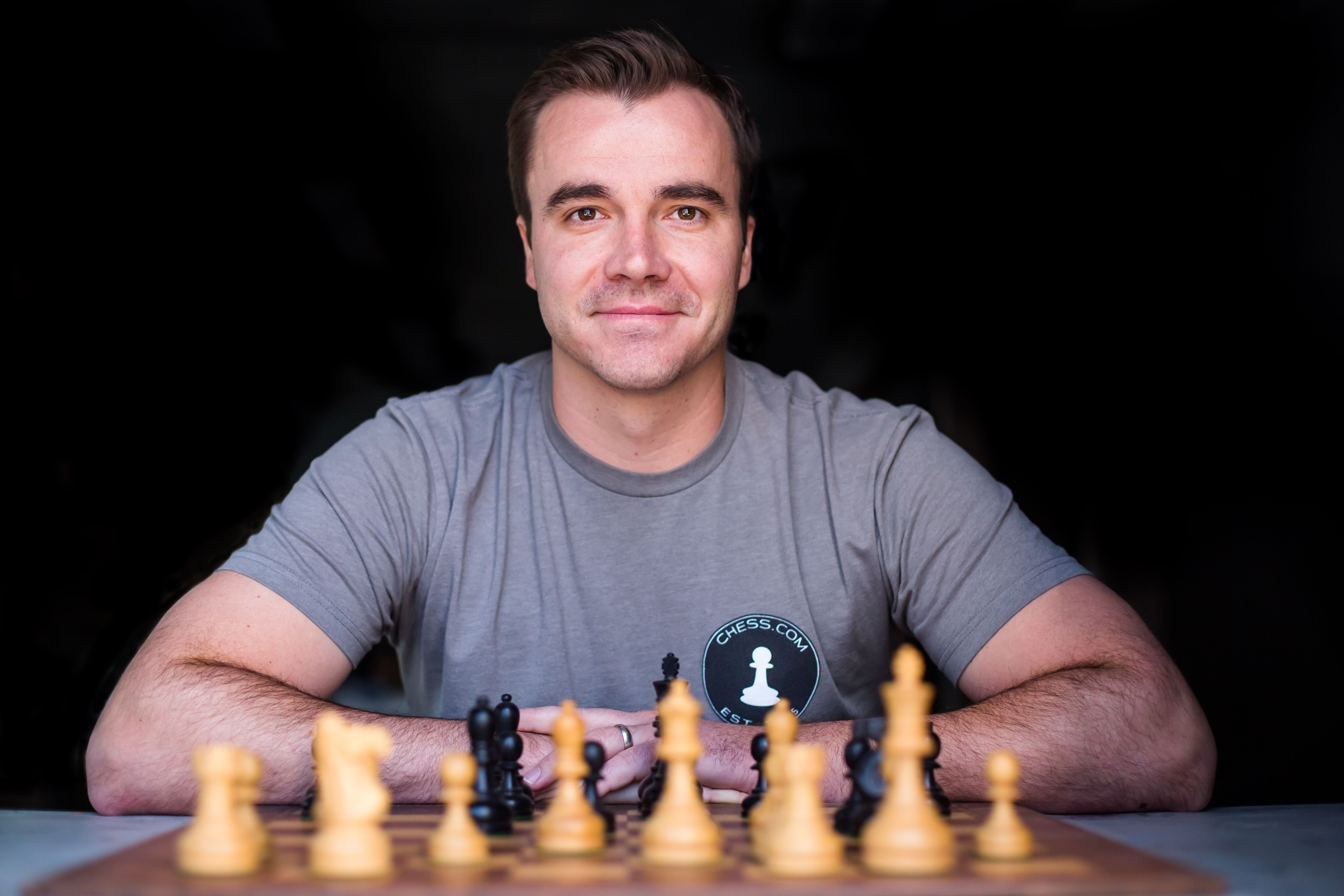
Rensch in 2022

==== Commentator ====
Rensch is known for his coverage of Chess.com's flagship events like the Bullet Chess Championship, PRO Chess League, the Speed Chess Championship, and PogChamps.

Rensch has also commentated live, over-the-board tournaments like the Isle of Man International, where top players like Magnus Carlsen and Fabiano Caruana competed. In 2019, Rensch also hosted the "Twitch Rivals" Komodo Boss Rush event live in San Francisco with grandmaster Robert Hess. Rensch also frequently commentates for large worldwide events such as the World Chess Championships, mostly alongside Robert Hess.

Rensch has also provided commentary for the most important chess event in the world, the World Chess Championship. He has hosted live broadcasts of the 2018 World Chess Championship between Magnus Carlsen and Fabiano Caruana, as well as the record-breaking coverage of the 2021 World Chess Championship between Magnus Carlsen and Ian Nepomniachtchi, which amassed more than 25 million views.

==== Tournament organizer ====
Rensch currently holds the United States Chess Federation record for most tournaments directed as Chief Director (1095), a number which has climbed to 1196 as of January 2020.

An online event, "The $40,000 GM Blitz Battle Championship", was organized and hosted by Rensch in 2016. The event included world number one, Magnus Carlsen, and 7 other world-class speed chess players. The tournament has since evolved into the Speed Chess Championships, becoming one of Chess.com's premier events. In 2019, the tournament featured a Junior and Women's Championship in addition to the primary event, and attracted players like Hikaru Nakamura, Levon Aronian, and Ding Liren.

In 2020, Rensch helped organize and hosted the first edition of PogChamps, an online chess tournament for internet personalities. The tournament gathered streamers with a large follower base, including xQc, MoistCr1tikal, Forsen, Fuslie, and Ludwig. Since then, three other editions of the event happened, attracting famous participants from other creative fields such as poker player Daniel Negreanu, actor Rainn Wilson, and rapper Logic.

Rensch also helped to organize the 2022 Rapid Chess Championship, an online event exclusive to the top-100 players in the world, top-10 women, top-10 juniors, and other invited players. The event features a $650,000 prize fund and has attracted some of the world's strongest players, including Anish Giri, Daniil Dubov, Fabiano Caruana, and others.

=== Lecturer ===
Rensch is a lecturer and has been a panelist as a presenter, speaker, and mediator over the years. In his lectures, Rensch talks about the game of chess, entrepreneurship, esports, and other subjects.

In 2017, Rensch was the presenter of the lecture "Chess and the Art of War: Strategies That Win," featuring Magnus Carlsen at the Milken Institute. During that event, Carlsen made a simultaneous exhibition against ten opponents, while Rensch explained the games and drew parallels between chess and business.

Two years later, Rensch hosted a chess and machine learning panel at the MIT Sloan Sports Analytics Conference. During the conference, Robert Hess played a simultaneous match against conference attendants. Rensch explained multiple chess concepts, how chess engines approach the game, and what humans can learn with them.

Rensch made his second appearance in the MIT Sloan Sports Analytics Conference in 2020 as a panelist. Like in the previous year, he was accompanied by Robert Hess, who this time played a blindfolded simultaneous match against four players. Other speakers included Daryl Morey, John Urschel, and Neil Paine. Rensch spoke about what chess could teach other sports, from rating systems to cheat detection.

Rensch returned to the MIT Sloan Sports Analytics Conference in 2021, held online due to COVID-19 restrictions. In that year, Rensch was the moderator of a panel composed by Daryl Morey, Robert Hess, Hikaru Nakamura, and Jennifer Shahade. The panel discussed the changes caused by the chess boom, propelled in large part by Netflix's miniseries The Queen's Gambit.

In 2022, Rensch lectured at the MIT Sloan Sports Analytics Conference for a fourth consecutive occasion as part of a panel alongside Robert Hess, Daryl Morey, Jennifer Yu, and Ella Papanek. Together, they discussed the impact of chess engines on the game, how chess adapted, and lessons other sports can take from it.

=== Author ===
Rensch has written a memoir that was published on September 16, 2025. The book, called Dark Squares: How Chess Saved My Life, describes his upbringing as a child born into the Church of Immortal Consciousness cult, and how chess served as his escape from reality, ultimately helping him to overcome many adversities.

== Personal life ==
Rensch’s mother and father are Deborah Lynn Sampson and Steve Rensch. In a biographical article written by Rensch and published in The Guardian in 2025, he describes growing up "dirt poor" in Tonto Village, Arizona, and being raised in the "Church of Immortal Consciousness", which Rensch describes as "a cult". He discovered chess, and as a child was inspired by seeing the movie, In Search of Bobby Fischer. He married, raised a family, and in 2021 left Tonto Village.

== Other work ==
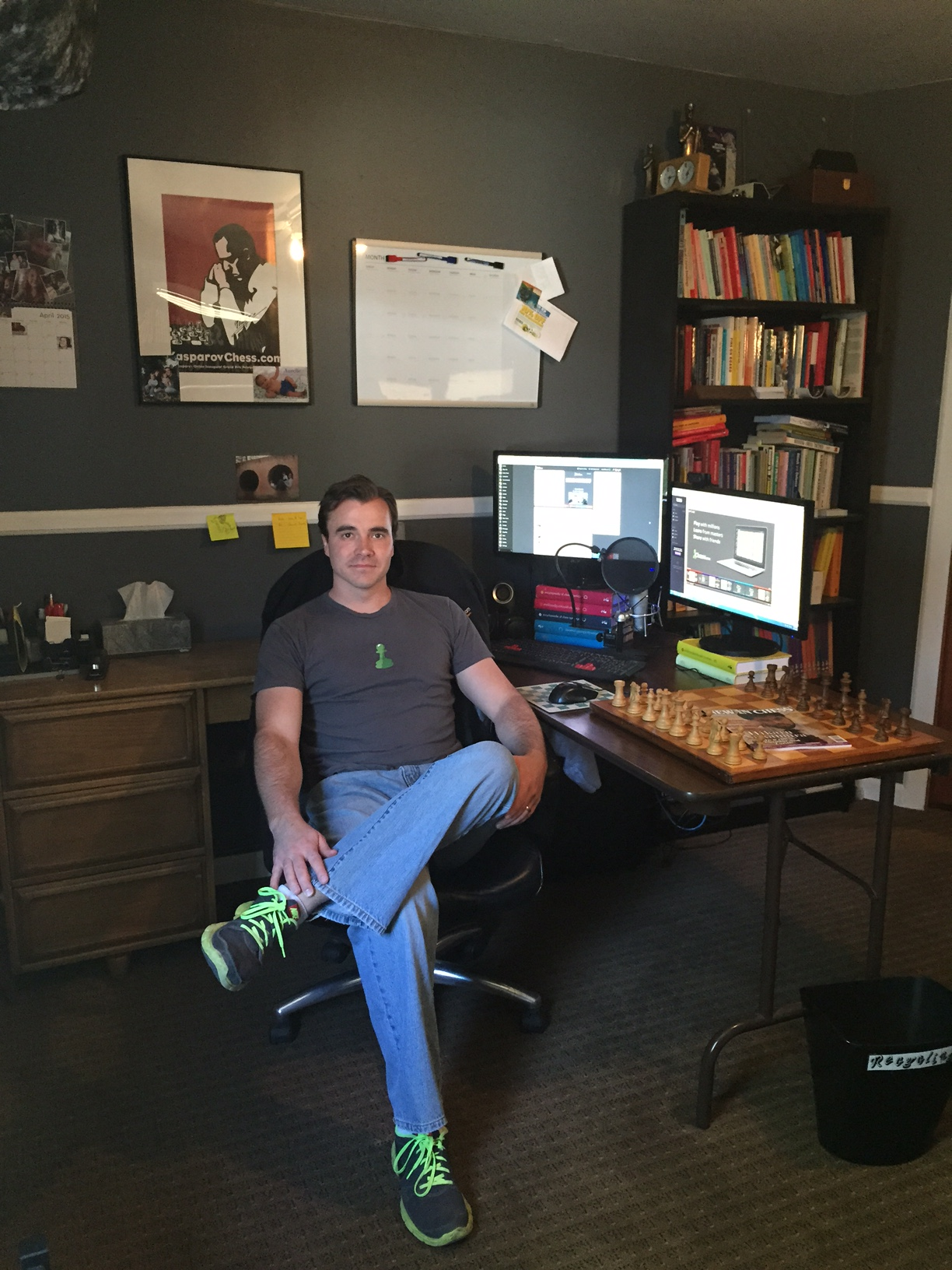
Rensch in 2015

Rensch helped Jake Goldberger direct the chess scenes in the independent film Life of a King.

Rensch co-hosted the podcast Coffeehouse Blunders for two seasons with James Montemagno where they discussed multiple subjects related to chess, including neural networks, openings, critiques of each episode of The Queen's Gambit, and more.

Rensch has appeared on numerous podcasts, including Perpetual Chess with Ben Johnson and US Chess' Ladies Knight.
