= Tyler1 =

American Twitch streamer (born 1995)

- Steinkamp in 2026
- Born: Tyler Steinkamp; March 7, 1995 (age 31); New London, Missouri, U.S.
- Other names: loltyler1; T1
- Occupations: Twitch streamer; YouTuber

Twitch information
- Channel: loltyler1
- Years active: 2016–present
- Genre: Gaming
- Game: League of Legends
- Followers: 5 million

YouTube information
- Channel: loltyler1
- Subscribers: 2.75 million
- Views: 648.1 million
- Last updated: February 8, 2026
- Website: www.loltyler1.com

Tyler Steinkamp (born March 7, 1995), known professionally as Tyler1, is an American online streamer and professional League of Legends player.

Steinkamp first gained notoriety when he was indefinitely banned from League of Legends in April 2016, due to disruptive conduct towards other players; his behavior earned him the nickname "The Most Toxic Player in North America". He was unbanned in 2018 after an appeal; his first stream after reinstatement peaked at over 382,000 concurrent viewers on Twitch, which broke a non-tournament record on the site. By 2021, Steinkamp was one of the most popular online streamers.

== Career ==
=== 2014–2016: Initial popularity and ban ===
In 2014, Steinkamp achieved Challenger (the highest rank in League of Legends) and 13th overall on the North American ladder. He was infamous among other high ranking players for his skill in playing the character Draven, but also for his toxic behavior. He verbally abused teammates and intentionally lost the game after perceived slights from his teammates. This behavior eventually led to permanent bans on 22 unique accounts over several years.

Steinkamp later increased his toxic behavior in order to draw in more viewers. In April 2016 he produced a video compilation of his toxic behavior with a promise to reform. The video received over 2 million views on YouTube. His Twitch channel increased from around 5,700 followers to over 92,000 followers by the end of the month. His improved behavior quickly lapsed but his following continued to grow, prompting high profile and professional players such as Meteos and Doublelift to publicly condemn his behavior.

On April 30, 2016, Riot Games employee "Riot Socrates" announced that due to "a well-documented history" of verbal abuse and player harassment, Steinkamp would no longer be allowed to own a League of Legends account, adding, "this dragged on too long, but we want you to know when the rare player comes along who's a genuine jerk, we've still got your back." Going forward, Riot would ban any account he played on, even if he had not yet broken any rules.

=== 2016–2018: Variety content and ban evasion ===
After becoming banned, Steinkamp continued to try to play League of Legends, but as soon as he publicly streamed himself playing, Riot Games would quickly discover it and ban his account. He also tried playing in his free time, repeatedly creating new accounts and climbing the competitive ladder before those too were discovered and banned. Unable to play League of Legends, Steinkamp was forced to branch out to other games to entertain his viewers, such as H1Z1 and PlayerUnknown's Battlegrounds. He also hosted non-gaming streams such as cosplaying as Bob Ross and teaching his viewers how to cook. Despite the ban, Steinkamp's following continued to grow, and he withdrew from university to focus on online content creation full time.

In August 2017, Riot Games community manager Phreak announced that Steinkamp would not be unbanned as some of his recent accounts had been penalized for verbal abuse. However, in October Riot Games employee Aaron "Sanjuro" Rutledge made insulting remarks about Steinkamp in the official r/LeagueOfLegends Subreddit's Discord server, saying Steinkamp looked like a "homunculus" and that he would die "from a coke overdose or testicular cancer from all the steroids." The company responded saying "what was said is NOT okay, and we take it extremely seriously", apologizing to Steinkamp and to the League of Legends community. Steinkamp responded to the incident saying, "It really sucks that some people still hold a grudge... and refuse to acknowledge I've changed." A few days later, investigative esports journalist Richard Lewis reported that Rutledge no longer worked at Riot Games.

Fans had been bringing "#FreeTyler1" signs to LCS games, which Riot Games later prohibited in the summer finals. Soon after, Steinkamp announced on stream that he received an email from Riot Games that his ban would be lifted at the end of the year if the accounts he played in the last month were "clean" of abusive behavior.

In November 2017, Steinkamp hosted an online League of Legends tournament called the Tyler1 Championship Series (TCS). A parody of the League of Legends Championship Series (LCS), Steinkamp streamed in front of a green screen to images of LCS stadiums and a commentators' desk. The tournament peaked at over 200,000 concurrent viewers on Twitch and was viewed by professional players and LCS casters. The winning team was awarded $10,000, funded from Steinkamp directly and without any sponsors.

In January 2018, Steinkamp was unbanned. Tyler's first stream after he became unbanned in January 2018 peaked at over 382,000 viewers, breaking the record for the most concurrent viewers for an individual streamer on Twitch set by Faker in 2017. This record was broken a month later by Dr Disrespect's first stream after returning from a 2-month hiatus, although due to conflicting media reporting and technical issues with Twitch, sources disagree whether the record was actually broken.

=== 2018–present: Return to League of Legends ===
Today, Steinkamp is one of the most popular online streamers. He estimates he earns more than $300,000 each year from merch alone, and estimates he has earned over $5 million in total during his streaming career. He has won the "Best League of Legends Streamer" award at The Streamer Awards in 2021 and 2022.

On April Fools' Day 2018, Steinkamp produced "A Day in the Life of Tyler1," a parody of his life in front of a green screen.

In June 2018, during an angry rant about recent changes to the game, Steinkamp admitted he was addicted to League of Legends, prompting other members of the community to share their addiction stories and share advice from Riot Games employees.

In September 2018, Riot Games invited Steinkamp to play in a "Streamer Showmatch" at the Oakland Arena with Imaqtpie and other content creators. He was also invited to commentate with Mark "MarkZ" Zimmerman on the analyst desk for the 2018 NA LCS Summer Finals.

The TCS returned in November 2018 with an increased prize pool of $50,000, funded again by Steinkamp directly. Polygon's Austen Goslin praised particularly its improvement in quality compared to the previous tournament, saying, "What started out as a meme... has morphed into something resembling a real online third-party tournament." In December 2019 the TCS returned for a third time. Former Echo Fox team owner Rick Fox joined Steinkamp to commentate the first match. The tournament peaked at over 90,000 concurrent viewers.

In 2020, to prove a point, Steinkamp began a "Jungle Challenge" to achieve Challenger (the game's highest competitive rank) in the jungle role. He briefly took a break from streaming to focus on the goal full time. He achieved that goal in May 2020 after 1,800 games played. He accomplished the same goal in the top lane role in June 2021 after 1,741 games played and the mid lane role in September 2021 after 1,800 games played. In February 2022 he reached Challenger on the final role of support after 450 games, an achievement few players have done in all five roles in League of Legends. Riot Games celebrated his accomplishment on Twitter and sent Steinkamp a custom-made gift of five medals, one for each role he reached Challenger in.

In October 2020, Steinkamp was signed by South Korean esports team T1 as a content creator. The organization produced a video with Steinkamp and T1 player Faker at the Heart Attack Grill in Las Vegas. The organization parted ways with Steinkamp in 2022.

In 2023, Steinkamp developed an interest for online chess. He played 2,435 games in 76 days, an average of 32 games per day. Later that year he was invited to compete in the amateur chess tournament PogChamps. In February 2024, he won "Best Chess Streamer" at the 2023 Streamer Awards. In March 2024, Steinkamp reached 1705 Elo on Chess.com, a rating that is in the top 1.5% of all players on the site. He achieved a peak Elo of 1960 two months later, placing him in the top 0.6%.

Since his unban, Steinkamp remained notorious for verbal toxicity. During an October 2022 stream sponsored by Blizzard Entertainment shortly after its release of Overwatch 2, it was revealed he had already been banned from the game's chat; a roll-over from his 10 year ban in Overwatch 1. In July 2022, after losing a match, he accused one of his teammates of wintrading a player on the opposing team. It was revealed they were players of the amateur team Team Ambition and were removed from the team after an investigation. In 2024, Steinkamp made hostile remarks about professional player CoreJJ after a poor performance in his game, calling him a "paycheck-stealing LCS [player]."

== Personal life ==
Steinkamp and his girlfriend Macaiyla at Twitch Rivals Power Meet 2 event in March 2022

Steinkamp studied computer science at Central Methodist University before withdrawing to focus on his streaming career. While at Central Methodist University, he played as a running back for the university's football team.

In an interview with The Washington Post, Steinkamp said he pays his mother $70,000 per year to cook dinner for him.

=== Children ===
On December 17, 2023, Steinkamp announced on social media that his girlfriend Macaiyla was pregnant. Their first daughter, Saiyler Rue Steinkamp, was born on April 11, 2024. On May 19, 2025, Steinkamp and Macaiyla announced on social media that she was once again pregnant and they were expecting a second child later that year. On September 19, 2025, the couple posted pictures on Instagram with the arrival of their second daughter. On November 1, 2026, the couple announced that Macaiyla was pregnant with their third child, a boy.

== Awards and nominations ==
Awards and nominations for Tyler1
Ceremony	Year	Category	Result	Ref.
The Streamer Awards	2021	Best League of Legends Streamer	Won	
The Streamer Awards	2022	Best League of Legends Streamer	Won	
The Streamer Awards	2023	Best Chess Streamer	Won	
The Streamer Awards	2024	Best MOBA Streamer	Nominated	
The Streamer Awards	2026	Best Fighting Game Streamer	Pending	

== See also ==
- List of most-followed Twitch channels
- Jensen, a professional League of Legends player who was banned from the game indefinitely and later unbanned
