= QTCinderella =

American Twitch streamer and YouTuber (born 1994)

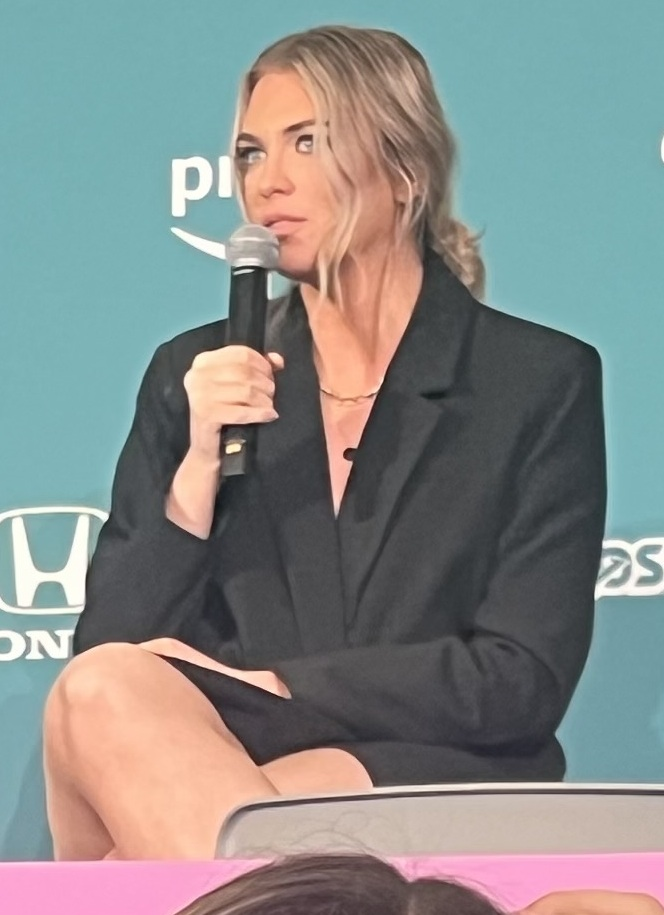
- QTCinderella in 2023
- Born: Blaire W. June 6, 1994 (age 32); Washington, United States
- Other name: QT
- Occupations: Twitch streamer; YouTuber; podcaster
- Organizations: Gen.G (2020–2021); Team SoloMid (2021–2022); Misfits Gaming (2022–2023)
- Spouse: Ludwig Ahgren (m. 2026)

Twitch information
- Channel: QTCinderella
- Years active: 2018–present
- Genres: Baking; cooking; IRL; reaction; gaming
- Followers: 1.3 million

YouTube information
- Channel: QTCinderella
- Years active: 2019–present
- Genres: IRL; reaction; vlogging; gaming
- Subscribers: 677 thousand
- Views: 199.66 million
- Last updated: Nov 18, 2026

Blaire W. (born June 6, 1994), known online as QTCinderella, is an American Twitch streamer, YouTuber, baker and podcaster. She is the creator and host of The Streamer Awards. She is also the host of the Wine About It podcast and a co-host of the Fear& podcast.

== Early life ==
Blaire W. was born on June 6, 1994, and grew up in Washington, the youngest of four children. Raised in a strict Mormon household, she is no longer a member of the faith. Her mother worked in call centers, and her father had a landscaping business. She often faced bullying in school due to her family's financial struggles. After graduating high school, she attended culinary school, honing skills she frequently uses in her Twitch livestreams today. Prior to content creation, she worked in retail as well as both a wedding cake designer and an interior designer for several years. QTCinderella also spent a period portraying Cinderella at Disneyland, which is where her streamer alias originated. Her mother died in 2016.

== Career ==
=== 2018–2020 ===
QTCinderella created her Twitch account in August 2018, primarily streaming League of Legends content, though she had wanted to stream since 2015 but couldn't due to not having the right equipment. From the beginning, her content revolved around gaming, baking, and collaborations with other creators. Starting from as early as June 2019, she has frequently collaborated with fellow streamer and future husband Ludwig Ahgren.

In March 2019, QTCinderella expanded her content creation by launching her main YouTube channel, where she primarily uploaded highlights from her Twitch streams.

By June 2020, QTCinderella had transitioned to full-time streaming, leaving her day job behind. On July 30, 2020, she joined Gen.G, an esports organization. Later that summer, in August and September 2020, QTCinderella participated in the PogChamps 2 amateur chess tournament hosted by Chess.com, reaching the semifinals of the consolation bracket.

=== 2021 ===
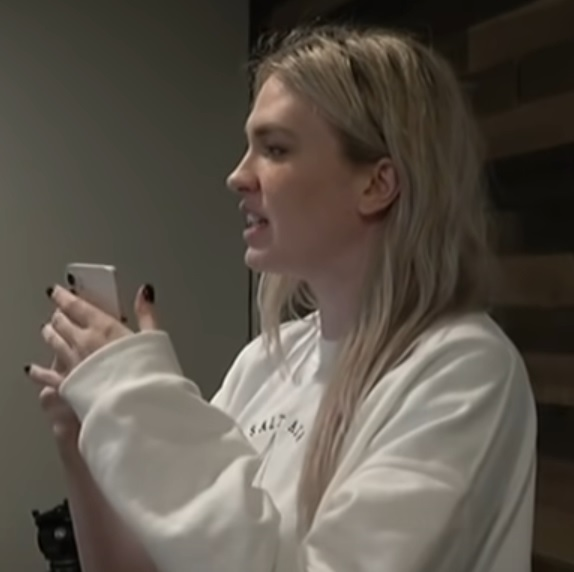
QTCinderella during Shitcamp 2021

On May 5, 2021, QTCinderella competed in the Botez Bullet Invitational, an online amateur bullet chess tournament held by Alexandra Botez and Andrea Botez. Later that year, in August and September 2021, she participated in the PogChamps 4 amateur chess tournament.

QTCinderella departed from Gen.G on June 16, 2021. A longtime fan of the organization, she then joined Team SoloMid (TSM) three months later, on September 21, 2021.

On September 26, 2021, QTCinderella organized ShitCamp in Los Angeles, California. The five-day summer event featuring many popular Twitch streamers, including Hasan Piker, Sodapoppin, xQc, Ludwig Ahgren, AustinShow, Myth, Nmplol, JustaMinx, and Adeptthebest, livestreamed activities including a scavenger hunt in Santa Monica, a cooking competition, a day at a gun range, a pajama party with drinking games, and a kickball tournament featuring the ShitCamp participants along with two visiting teams from 100 Thieves and OfflineTV. The event managed to average more than 65,000 viewers throughout the stream.

=== 2022 ===
QTCinderella founded and co-hosted the inaugural Streamer Awards, an annual awards show dedicated to celebrating achievements in livestreaming. The event was held on March 12, 2022, at The Fonda Theatre in Los Angeles and was broadcast live on her Twitch channel to over 381,000 concurrent viewers. It was attended by several prominent streamers as nominees and guests, including Amouranth, Hasan Piker, Pokimane, and xQc.

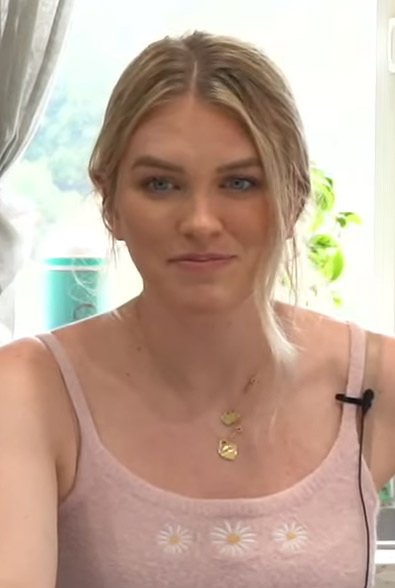
QTCinderella during a baking stream in 2022

Two months later, on May 14, QTCinderella hosted Twitch Rivals: QTCinderella's Sweet Showdown ft. Kitchen League, a baking competition featuring fellow creators Hasan Piker, Myth, Cyr, and Rich Campbell. On June 2, the talent management firm Loaded announced that they had signed QTCinderella. On June 5, she hosted a Beyblade tournament, which featured 32 streamers competing in a double elimination bracket.

On August 8, 2022, Will Neff, a fellow Twitch streamer, announced that QTCinderella would be joining him as the co-host of Hey, Donna!, a new G4TV comedy series. She organized the second iteration of ShitCamp in Fresno, California, in September 2022.

On November 1, 2022, QTCinderella announced that she was no longer with Team SoloMid (TSM). On November 3, 2022, it was announced that she had joined Misfits Gaming. Her signing with the organization was revealed alongside an announcement that Misfits had established a US$20 million content creator fund for original content creation.

=== 2023 ===
From January 15 to 19, 2023, QTCinderella organized and hosted the first season of Master Baker, a five-day cooking competition featuring six popular streamers who possess little to no prior baking experience inspired by The Great British Bake-Off. Later, from January 26 to 27, she appeared as a special guest for week one of the 2023 LCS Split.

On January 30, 2023, QTCinderella became aware of the unauthorized, pornographic use of her likeness on a deepfake website. The existence of the non-consensual sexual material was discovered after streamer and former collaborator Brandon Ewing, professionally known as Atrioc, inadvertently revealed the website in a browser tab while streaming. In addition to QTCinderella, the website infringed on the likeness of various other individuals, including streamers Maya Higa and Pokimane. As a result of efforts by Ewing, QTCinderella, and attorney Ryan Morrison, the website was promptly taken offline. QTCinderella's boyfriend, Ludwig Ahgren, has stated that the experience has had a lingering impact on her mental well-being.

On March 11, 2023, QTCinderella organized and co-hosted the second edition of the Streamer Awards with Valkyrae at The Wiltern in Los Angeles. The ceremony averaged 425,000 live concurrent viewers and peaked at over 580,000 live concurrent viewers. She revealed that she had spent more than $900,000 on the event.

From May 31 to June 4, 2023, QTCinderella organized and hosted Season 2 of Master Baker. From July 27 to 30, 2023, she co-hosted the fourth season of Streamer Camp alongside fellow streamers Fuslie, BoxBox, and Kkatamina. The 4-day streaming boot camp is a competition aimed at improving the skills of up-and-coming smaller streamers.

In July and August 2023, QTCinderella participated in the PogChamps 5 chess tournament. She placed second in the consolation bracket after losing to higher-rated Norwegian streamer Wirtual in a live over-the-board finals match held in Los Angeles on August 18. She collected a $5,000 prize for her placement in the tournament.

On October 1, 2023, QTCinderella organized and co-hosted The Gala for Good charity auction alongside Maya Higa, who is also a conservationist. The gala was live streamed on her Twitch channel and brought together many large streamers to raise money for rainforest conservation. The event raised over US$250,000, which was split across five non-profit environmental organizations: Rainforest Foundation US, Rainforest Trust, World Wildlife Fund, Amazon Watch, and Rainforest Alliance. On December 7, 2023, QTCinderella announced that she was no longer with Misfits Gaming.

=== 2024 ===
In February 2024, QTCinderella faced controversies after she launched a new Twitch channel, named QTEvents, with the purpose of rerunning videos from her YouTube channel in order to generate funds for the then-upcoming 2024 Streamer Awards. On February 10, 2024, both of her Twitch accounts were banned for 41 minutes after her re-run channel, QTEvents, showed an Omegle YouTube clip, which is against the Twitch TOS.

On February 17, 2024, QTCinderella organized and co-hosted the third edition of the Streamer Awards at The Wiltern in Los Angeles with Pokimane. The ceremony peaked at over 645,000 live concurrent viewers, with a record-breaking 639,609 individual votes submitted by viewers. On February 29, 2024, QTCinderella created Late Night w/ QT, a weekly show live-streamed on her Twitch channel. Each episode features a news segment, an interview and game with a guest, and a performance by a music streamer.

In March 2024, QTCinderella went viral after she started a streaming challenge called the "name 100 women" challenge, a challenge to celebrate Women's History Month in which she asked several popular male streamers to name 100 women during a livestream before the Women's History Month ended.

From April 17 to 21, 2024, she organized and hosted Season 3 of Master Baker. In May 2024, QTCinderella broke the Speedrun.com record for baking 12 chocolate chip cookies with a time of three minutes and 46 seconds. Her approved run caused the site to temporarily archive the IRL Cookie Baking category in order to reevaluate its rules and make them more comprehensive. Following the rule update, QTCinderella submitted a new run of four minutes and 39 seconds which was accepted by the site as the new record.

In November 2024, she was ranked 19th by Complex Networks in its list of "The 25 Best Streamers Right Now". On December 7, 2024, QTCinderella organized and co-hosted the fourth edition of the Streamer Awards with TinaKitten at the Mayan Theater in Los Angeles. This was the first time the event was held in the fourth quarter of the year instead of the first. The ceremony peaked at over 525,000 live concurrent viewers.

=== 2025 ===
On May 26, 2025, she served as a co-host of the red carpet pre-show for the 2025 American Music Awards alongside Tetris Kelly. From June 19 to 22, 2025, she organized and hosted Season 4 of Master Baker. On July 3, 2025, she appeared in an episode of Billboard's Takes Us Out series with Alex Warren.

On September 14, 2025, she served as a host of the red carpet pre-show for the 2025 Primetime Emmy Awards.

On December 6, 2025, QTCinderella organized and co-hosted the fifth edition of the Streamer Awards at The Wiltern in Los Angeles with Maya Higa. The ceremony peaked at over a million live concurrent viewers, with 1,090,358 individual votes already submitted several days before voting was set to close.

=== 2026 ===
From April 16 to 19, 2026, QTCinderella organized and hosted Season 5 of Master Baker. In May 2026, she joined Creative Artists Agency.

== Other ventures ==
=== Music ===
In December 2020, QTCinderella and Ludwig Ahgren released their own rendition of the Christmas song "Baby, It's Cold Outside" as part of Ahgren's Christmas Album A Very Mogul Christmas.

On July 13, 2025, QTCinderella released a single, "Forever", featuring TJ Brown.

=== Wine About It Podcast ===
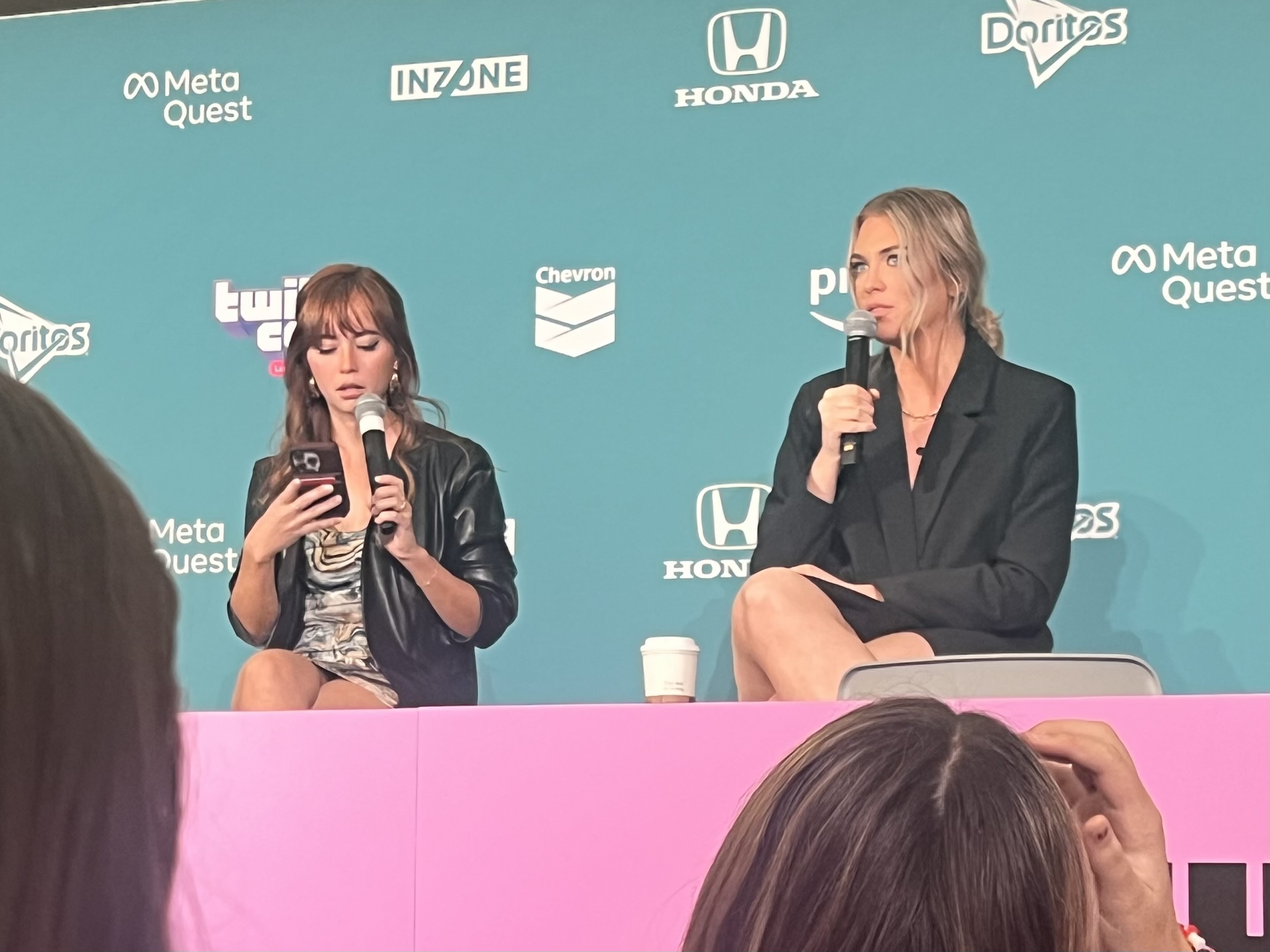
QTCinderella with Maya Higa at a TwitchCon panel for Wine About It in 2023

In November 2021, QTCinderella started a podcast titled Wine About It with friend and fellow streamer Maya Higa. The podcast went on hiatus in September 2022 after Higa announced her "indefinite" break from online content creation. On March 11, 2023, the duo announced the return of the podcast alongside the launch of the Wine About It Patreon. On July 2, 2025, it was announced that Higa would leave the podcast to further focus on the future of her work as a conservationist at Alveus Sanctuary. QTCinderella went on to announce the decision to continue the podcast with Valkyrae as her new co-host.

=== Fear& Podcast ===
In early 2023, QTCinderella joined the Fear& podcast as a co-host alongside fellow streamers Hasan Piker, Will Neff, and AustinShow.

=== Deco Deco craft store ===
In January 2025, QTCinderella opened Deco Deco, a Japanese-inspired craft store in Los Angeles.

== Personal life ==
QTCinderella began dating fellow streamer Ludwig Ahgren in early 2020. The two got engaged on July 5, 2026, and publicly announced their engagement on July 10, 2026. They got married later in October, and they currently reside in Los Angeles.

=== Health ===
QTCinderella has openly discussed her mental health struggles. In a YouTube interview, she revealed diagnoses of post-traumatic stress disorder (PTSD) and obsessive–compulsive disorder. QTCinderella also confided about a years-long battle with body dysmorphia and how the deepfake incident in January 2023 has caused the resurgence of her eating disorder. On August 8, 2023, she tweeted that she had been diagnosed with the dissociative subtype of PTSD. She was officially diagnosed after being swatted in her home three times in three months.

== Discography ==
=== Albums ===
Year	Title	Details	Ref.
2026	I Don't Want to Talk About That	Release Date: TBA; Producers: TBA	

=== Singles ===
List of singles, showing year released and producers
Year	Title	Details	Ref.
2020	"Baby, It's Cold Outside" (Frank Loesser cover) (with Ludwig Ahgren)	Release Date: December 6, 2020; Producers: Blair Benzel	
2021	"Santa Baby" (Eartha Kitt cover)	Release Date: December 11, 2021; Producers: Blair Benzel	
2025	"Forever" (featuring TJ Brown)	Release Date: July 14, 2025; Producers: TJ Brown	
2025	"Counting"	Release Date: December 22, 2025; Producers: Ryan King	

== Awards and nominations ==
Year	Ceremony	Category	Result	Ref.
2022	Esports Awards 2022	Streamer of the Year	Nominated	
2022	12th Streamy Awards	Breakout Streamer	Nominated	
2022	The Game Awards 2022	Content Creator of the Year	Nominated	
2023	Esports Awards 2023	Streamer of the Year	Nominated	
