= Neekolul =

American content creator (born 1997)

- Born: Nicole Sanchez; July 14, 1997 (age 29); San Mateo, California, U.S.
- Other name: Neeko
- Occupation: Twitch streamer

Twitch information
- Channel: neeko
- Years active: 2017–present
- Genre: Gaming
- Games: League of Legends; Dead by Daylight
- Followers: 413 thousand

YouTube information
- Channel: neekolul
- Years active: 2020–present
- Subscribers: 81.1 thousand
- Views: 2.3 million
- Last updated: December 28, 2025

Nicole Sanchez (born July 14, 1997), better known as Neekolul, is an American online streamer, YouTuber and internet personality. In March 2020, her popularity online rose when she uploaded a TikTok featuring her lip syncing to the song "Oki Doki Boomer" while wearing a Bernie 2020 crop top; this TikTok was a direct reference to the "OK boomer" Internet meme that was popularized in late 2019. From 2020 to 2023, she was signed as a content creator for the gaming organization 100 Thieves.

== Early life ==
Sanchez is of primarily Indigenous American of Mexican descent. Her family immigrated to California from Mexico. She studied business and marketing at Southern Methodist University before moving to New York City.

== Online career ==
=== Overview ===
Sanchez is primarily a Twitch streamer and partner, having created her "neeko" Twitch account in October 2017. As she is bilingual, Neekolul streams in both English and Spanish. According to social media analytics firm Social Blade, her account has received over 278,000 followers and over 3.84 million views as of November 4, 2020. She decided to become a Twitch streamer in particular due to the convenience of the medium; unlike content creators on YouTube, Twitch streamers' content is unedited, allowing her to dedicate adequate time to her studies. She streamed Call of Duty early in her career, but eventually switched over to streaming Fortnite.

=== OK Boomer video and reception (2020) ===
On March 2, 2020, Sanchez went viral online after she posted a TikTok video lip syncing and dancing to the Senzawa song "Oki Doki Boomer" while wearing a Bernie 2020 shirt. The video and its caption were referencing the "OK boomer" Internet meme that was popularized by Gen Z individuals and used to criticize the Baby boomer generation. It received over 6 million views in 4 days on TikTok. It was later removed due to a copyright takedown, although the song's artist stated she was not responsible for the copyright strike. On Twitter, the video has received over 30 million views. Sanchez stated the video received over 50 million views by April. The video was met with mixed reactions, with users divided over whether the video was cute and charming, or "cringeworthy". Kotaku commented that "the video is mesmerizing in a way that makes you feel a small amount of secondhand embarrassment. In it, Neekolul performs a hyper-feminine and cutesy series of dance movements, with the results bordering on cloying. It's a subtle balancing act between irony and sincerity that TikTok's most popular video makers have mastered." In April, The Daily Dot ranked "'Oki Doki Boomer' TikTok memes" at 12th on their list of "the best memes of 2020".

Sanchez was a noted supporter of Bernie Sanders and his 2020 U.S. presidential campaign. The official TikTok account for Sanders' campaign also commented on the video, and Sanchez stated that the campaign's head of social media reached out to her to collaborate. Uploaded a day prior to the Democratic Party presidential primaries on Super Tuesday, many online users claimed that Sanchez's video had an adverse effect on Sanders' performance in primary voting. She stated, however, "I don't think I'm a huge driver of votes or anything, but I think the content creators and Internet culture as a whole can bring awareness to things like this."

Following her increase in popularity, it became apparent that much of her online fanbase were following her for ulterior motives; a significant amount of engagement on her content were users' attempts to flirt or describe their physical attraction to her. Many of her fans were noted for their "simping", with the term simp referring to someone who is considered to show too much sympathy and attention to a person they like, often in service of unreciprocated sexual feelings. After Sanchez revealed she has a boyfriend, she lost over 65,000 Twitter followers within 48 hours. She has since stated she said this as entertainment for her viewers; Kotaku wrote that "like many of her fans, she's constantly dancing on the impossibly blurry line between irony and sincerity."

=== Twitch streaming and content creation (2020–present) ===
She has since continued to upload content online. Her Twitter account was briefly suspended as a result of her content being flagged by false copyright claims. One of her subsequent TikTok videos featured her dancing along to the song "Mia Khalifa", which drew several comparisons to Belle Delphine's similar 2019 video. Her streaming style has been compared to Pokimane. In April, Kotaku commented on her streams, stating that "even as she's blown up, in her streams she continues to behave in a way that feels accessible and inviting, verging on bubbly. That is not to say, however, that she doesn't know what she's doing." The outlet added that her notoriety as a personality and streamer was growing, rather than "just as a meme." Later that month, she signed with Night Media, a content management company.

After signing with Night Media, Tubefilter reported that she began planning to branch out on YouTube and had a product line in development. In July 2020, she joined the roster of American lifestyle brand and esports organization 100 Thieves as a content creator. She left 100 Thieves in 2023.

In February 2021, she was one of twelve contenders in the third edition of the PogChamps tournament organized by Chess.com and was the winner of the consolation bracket. Later that June, she released a YouTube video called "$2,000,000 Apartment Tour" which drew heavy criticism and overwhelming dislikes on the video for alleged hypocrisy. She had previously defended herself against accusations of hypocrisy by saying of the "Tax the rich" slogan seen on her AOC sweater: "I think when people mean like, 'Tax the rich,' I think at the end of the day they do mean, like, billionaires and people who have insane, unfathomable amounts of wealth".

== Media reception ==
Nathan Grayson of Kotaku surmised on Sanchez's popularity, stating that "the cutesiness of Neekolul's recent videos and her relative proximity to so-called 'egirls' like Belle Delphine has given rise to accusations that the fans who find her attractive are people who want women to behave in ways that are child-like, naive, or foolish." Gita Jackson of Vice similarly wrote on Neekolul's appeal, stating that "like so many objects of male attention before her, her mere presence as a human being will either cause you to simp or to shun. But she's just followed a formula that's been thrust upon young, attractive women since men have been able to gawk at them." Jackson added that, "Some of [Neekolul's] critics say that by wearing a cosplay school uniform, dancing, and talking like a sexy baby, she is reinforcing negative stereotypes about women and encouraging men attracted to women to indulge in a fetish for seeing them infantilized."
