= Sweet Anita =

English streamer and YouTuber (born 1990)

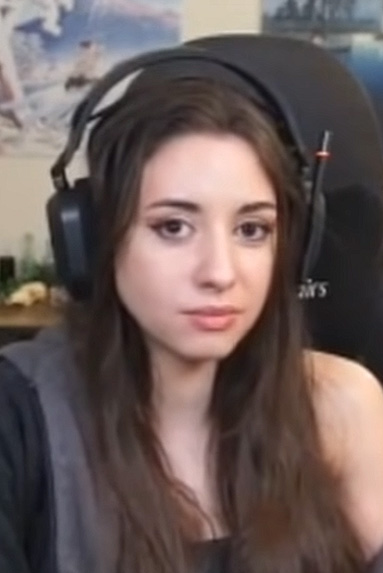
- Anita in April 2022
- Born: 28 July 1990 (age 36); East Anglia, England
- Occupations: Twitch streamer; YouTuber

Twitch information
- Channel: Sweet_Anita
- Years active: 2018–present
- Genres: Chatting; gaming
- Followers: 1.90 million

YouTube information
- Channel: Sweet Anita
- Subscribers: 1.56 million
- Views: 169 million
- Last updated: 21 March 2026

Sweet Anita (born 28 July 1990) is an English streamer and YouTuber.

== Early life ==
Anita was born in East Anglia on 28 July 1990, and was raised by a single mother. She later moved to South West England. She was diagnosed with Tourette syndrome, including the rare symptom of coprolalia, at the age of 27. She exhibited symptoms of the disorder throughout her teenage years and could only participate in formal education for a year because of her tics. She attempted to get a diagnosis when she was 13 but the doctor did not take her symptoms seriously, claimed she would grow out of it, and dismissed her as seeking attention; over a decade later, she visited a hospital in another attempt to get a diagnosis, and was diagnosed with Tourette syndrome after a week of tests.

== Career ==
Anita began streaming on Twitch in 2018. Her early streams consisted of gaming content, primarily Overwatch. She quickly gained popularity after clips of her profanity-laden outbursts, caused by her Tourette syndrome, went viral. Later that year, Variety named her among the most influential people in video games. In 2019, she was nominated for her first major award at the 11th Shorty Awards for "Twitch Streamer of the Year". In December 2020, she hosted VY Esports' online gaming festival LuudoFest.

Anita has hosted multiple fundraisers for the charity Tourettes Action.

== Personal life ==
Anita identifies as demisexual. She rehabilitates animals in her spare time and has cared for several rabbits, rats, and chinchillas. She also ran her own business selling sea glass that she collected from the seashore. She has discussed her experience with Tourette syndrome in several interviews in an effort to raise awareness and promote education on its effects, by citing examples such as its impact on daily social interactions.

Anita has been a victim of deepfake porn and online harassment, raising concerns about the lack of legal protections and difficulty removing such content from the internet. Efforts are being made to advocate for federal legislation and raise awareness about the issue of revenge porn and its impact on victims. In mid-2019, she revealed that she was experiencing long-term harassment and abuse from an unidentified stalker. She criticised the police's handling of the situation in a tweet that said, "If anything happens to me, I really hope that I'm the last canary in the coal mine. The law needs to change. No job should have such a high risk of rape, assault or death, especially not live streaming." In September 2020, she released a YouTube video detailing her ordeal along with the experience of several other online personalities in regards to stalking.

== Awards and nominations ==
Awards and nominations received by Sweet Anita
Year	Ceremony	Category	Result	Ref.
2019	11th Shorty Awards	Twitch Streamer of the Year	Nominated	
2019	37th Golden Joystick Awards	Best Streamer/Broadcaster	Nominated	
