= Hafu (gamer) =

American professional esports player and Twitch streamer (born 1991)

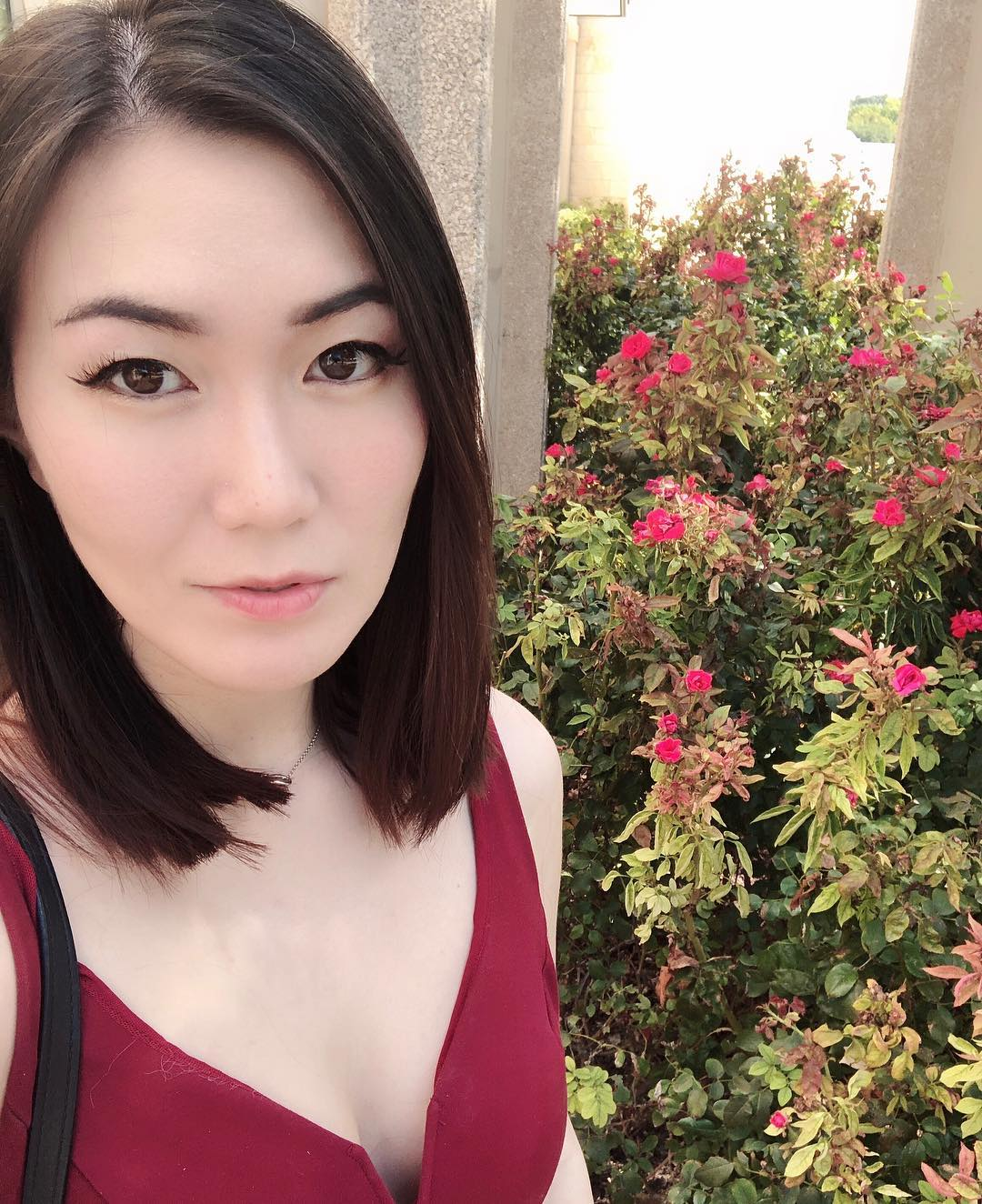
- Wang in 2018
- Born: Rumay Wang; April 18, 1991 (age 34); Newton, Massachusetts, U.S.
- Spouse: David Caero (m. 2021)

Twitch information
- Channel: ItsHafu
- Years active: 2008–present
- Genre: Gaming
- Followers: 1.3 million

Esports career information
- Games: Hearthstone; Teamfight Tactics; Bloodline Champions; World of Warcraft; Among Us
- Role: Streamer

Chinese name
- Chinese: 王儒枚
Transcriptions
Standard Mandarin
- Hanyu Pinyin: Wáng Rúméi
- Last updated: May 3, 2023

Rumay Wang (born April 18, 1991), better known as Hafu, is an American Twitch streamer and former professional World of Warcraft, Bloodline Champions and Hearthstone player.

== Early life ==
Wang was born in Newton, Massachusetts, to Chinese immigrant parents from Beijing. She grew up in Lexington, graduating from Lexington High School in 2010 after taking a year off for her esports career. She was introduced to the MMORPG World of Warcraft in high school by her friends. She later studied at Bentley University but dropped out to focus on gaming.

== Career ==
Wang started taking the game World of Warcraft more seriously when the player versus player (PvP) arena mode was introduced to the game in 2007. At this point, she did not know it was possible to play video games professionally, but her talent called the attention of sponsors, which allowed her to attend the Major League Gaming (MLG) in 2008, and several other tournaments over the next years. Eventually, Wang switched to another PvP arena game, Bloodline Champions, becoming the DreamHack Summer 2011 champion, along with teammates MegaZero and Iverson.

More recently, Wang's main focus has been on her career as a live streamer, although she has taken part in some gaming tournaments, most notably for Hearthstone. Several thousand people regularly view her Twitch streams, and she has over 1 million followers on her channel. In late 2015, she appeared on Smasher's Legends of Gaming. On August 15, 2019, Wang joined G2 Esports as a Teamfight Tactics streamer. Wang won the second PogChamps chess tournament in September 2020.

She has spoken out against sexual harassment in gaming.

In September 2020, Wang began streaming and posting videos of her playing Among Us, frequently playing with other popular streamers including Disguised Toast, dakotaz, and xChocoBars. The increasing popularity of the game in part allowed her to become the second most-viewed female streamer in the month of November, only being surpassed by Valkyrae.

== Personal life ==
Wang married fellow Twitch streamer David "Dogdog" Caero, on April 13, 2021.

== Awards and nominations ==
Year	Ceremony	Category	Result	Ref.
2020	Forbes 30 Under 30	Games	Included	
