= Jinnytty =

South Korean online streamer (born 1992)

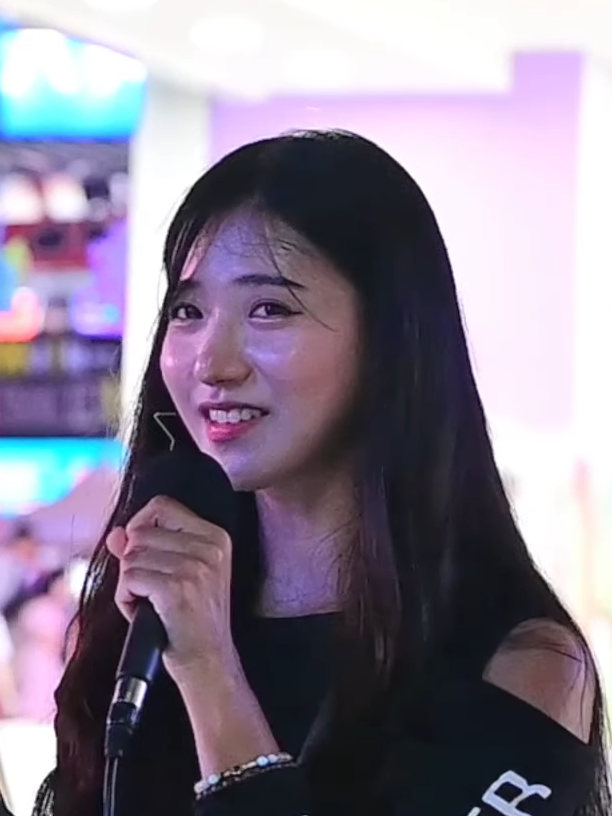
- Jinnytty in June 2023
- Born: Yoo Yoon-jin; July 28, 1992 (age 34); Seoul, South Korea
- Other names: Jinny; Penguin Sister; 72 Mei
- Education: Yonsei University (Information and Interaction Design)
- Occupation: Online streamer
- Years active: 2017–present
- Organization: TSM

Twitch information
- Channel: Jinnytty
- Genres: IRL; Video gaming
- Followers: 1,000,000

YouTube information
- Channel: Jinnytty 企鵝妹 지니티
- Subscribers: 558,000
- Views: 97 million

Korean name
- Hangul: 유윤진
- RR: Yu Yunjin
- MR: Yu Yunjin
- Last updated: 12 November 2025
- Website: jinnytty.com

Yoo Yoon-jin (Korean: 유윤진; born July 28, 1992), better known as Jinnytty (윰찌니), is a South Korean online streamer. Her streams typically consist of her traveling to different countries. She is known as the Penguin Sister (Chinese: 企鵝妹) to her Chinese audience.

== Early life and education ==
Yoo graduated from University High School in Irvine, California in 2010, then graduated from Yonsei University with a degree in Information and Interaction Design in South Korea.

== Career ==
Yoo started live streaming on Twitch at the end of June 2017. During this period, she liked to play Hearthstone, and she also watched professional player games or teaching videos.

After becoming popular, Yoo catered to the audience with high interactivity, pure style, and increased her Taiwanese content. She also traveled to Taiwan in March 2018 and held a fan meeting.

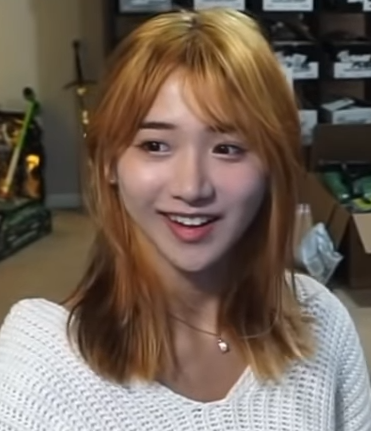
Yoo during a livestream in 2021

At the end of 2019, Yoo changed her target audience to European and American viewers and also traveled to the United States. During the beginning of COVID-19 pandemic, she stayed at the home of the American streamer EsfandTV for several months, and they streamed together from time to time.

From 2020 to 2022, Yoo traveled to and streamed live in South Korea, Europe and the United States.

On October 6, 2022, it was announced that Yoo had signed with esports organization TSM.

In 2023, Yoo walked 1076 kilometers around the entire length of Taiwan in what has become her most popular streamed event known as Waddlethon, during which she gained over 90K followers and 6.5M hours watched. During her Waddlethon on April 24, 2023, Yoo encountered a veiled stalker that followed her around for about 4 hours. The police were contacted and the stalker was institutionalized. On Day 8 of her Waddlethon, May 1, 2023, she achieved a personal record of 26,902 concurrent viewers.

In April 2025, Yoo announced that she was barred from entering Taiwan for three years after authorities found she had worked without a permit during a 2023 pop-up event for a video game company.

In May 2025, Yoo was attacked during a street livestream in Toulouse, France, by a man who thought she was filming him and struck her camera while shouting insults.

== Filmography ==
=== Music video appearances ===
Year	Title	Artist	Ref.
2020	Tier 4 – "Bang Bang"	Jinnytty, HAchubby, Yunicorn, Yuggie_TV	
2021	Tier 4 – "Summer Fire"	Jinnytty, HAchubby, Yunicorn, Yuggie_TV	

== Awards and nominations ==
Award ceremony	Year	Category	Nominee / Work	Result	Ref.
The Streamer Awards	2021	Best IRL Streamer	Jinnytty	Nominated	
The Streamer Awards	2022	Best IRL Streamer	Jinnytty	Nominated	
The Streamer Awards	2023	Best IRL Streamer	Jinnytty	Won	
