= Harry Mack =

American rapper and YouTuber (born 1990)

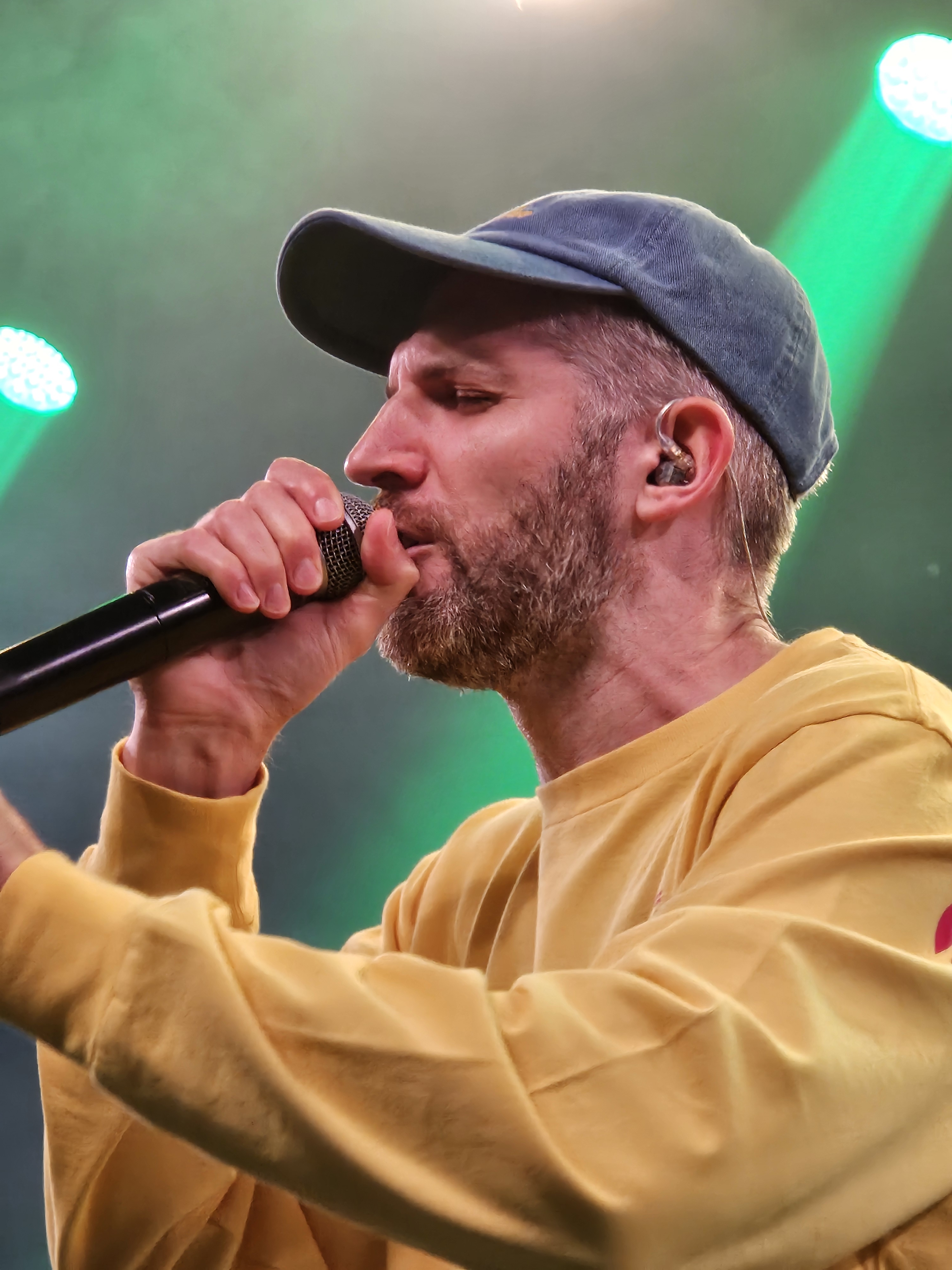
- Mack in 2026

Background information
- Born: Harry Hamilton McKenzie; February 17, 1990 (age 36); Portland, Oregon, U.S.
- Education: USC Thornton School of Music
- Genres: Freestyle rap; boom bap; golden age hip hop; jazz rap
- Occupations: Rapper; producer; drummer; songwriter
- Years active: 2002–present
- Labels: Mush Man LLC (from 2019); Independent (until 2019)
- Formerly of: State of Mind
- Website: www.harrymackofficial.com

Harry Hamilton McKenzie (born February 17, 1990), commonly known as Harry Mack, is an American rapper, producer, drummer, and YouTuber from Portland, Oregon, known for his viral freestyles performed in public. He has a large social media following, with millions of followers on multiple platforms. His most popular series include Guerrilla Bars, where he raps on the streets, and Omegle Bars, where he raps virtually on the online chat service Omegle. Aside from freestyling, he has also released a full-length album, Contents Under Pressure.

== Early life ==
Harry McKenzie was born on February 17, 1990, in Portland, Oregon. His background in music began at age seven playing the violin, followed by drum playing in fourth or fifth grade. His older sister introduced him to hip hop via the radio Jammin' 95.5. Mack began rapping in sixth grade, at 12, with his friend Brady B, an aspiring DJ. They formed a group called State of Mind and released an album when they were in middle school. Mack went by the alias MC Wundur at this time.

The group continued making music into high school and added two more members: Elan Eichler, an MC known as Mighty Misc, and Jack Baars, a DJ and producer known as DJ Malfunktion. They began to take it more seriously starting in their sophomore year and booked venues to perform at and sold CDs. Originally from Portland, Mack moved to California in 2008 to major in Jazz Studies at the USC Thornton School of Music at the University of Southern California, as at the time he wanted to become a jazz drummer. He enjoyed the improvisational aspect of jazz and began to practice freestyling to work on his ability to do so. His roommates would test him on his freestyling every night.

== Career ==
Mack's college roommates eventually made him start practicing in public, in places such as Venice Beach. He uploaded a video of one of his sessions in February 2017 titled "Venice Beach Freestyle (Part 1)", which reached nearly a million views within a few months, catapulting him into the mainstream. In March, Mack freestyled on the Power 106 radio for fellow rapper Joey Bada$$, who threw words out for Mack to implement into the freestyle, a common occurrence in Mack's work. This event was covered by XXL, which praised Mack for his lyrical abilities. Mack came back onto Power 106 to freestyle for Kendrick Lamar in June, Casey Veggies in July, and Macklemore in September. Also in September, he freestyled on The Ellen DeGeneres Show and also made a short film with Red Bull, touring them around Los Angeles.

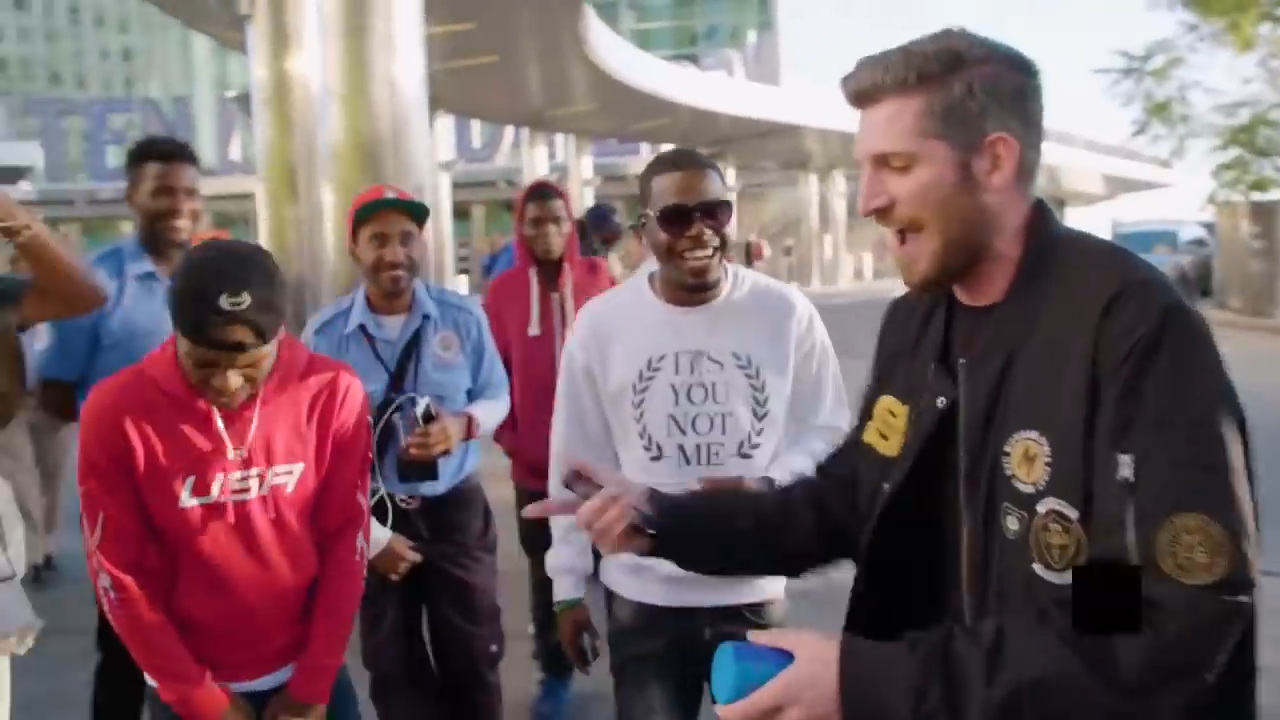
Mack freestyling in New York in 2018

In June 2018, Mack partnered with Mitsubishi Motors to create Harry Mack Freestyle Test Drives, a marketing campaign where Mack freestyle about the features of the car a person was driving as they tested it out. United Talent Agency represented him and helped him make the deal. Mack independently released his first album, Contents Under Pressure, on January 18, 2019. He eventually signed to Mush Man LLC in August 2019. In December 2020, he interviewed Counter Strike: Global Offensive player n0thing and freestyled over his gameplay on Twitch. He also teamed up with Marc Rebillet in May 2021. In celebration of him reaching a million subscribers on YouTube, Mack freestyled for ten hours straight in June 2021. In August, he participated in PogChamps 4. Mack performed at the Shacknews E6 in 2022. In this year, he also embarked on a tour to the United Kingdom. For his 2023 U.S. tour, Odyssey, he was sponsored by Starbucks. He had previously collaborated with the coffeehouse chain to host Reverse Roasts, where Mack performs freestyles to uplift people. To promote the tour, he appeared on TNT and freestyled for the hosts of the show. Mack helped promote the film Teenage Mutant Ninja Turtles: Mutant Mayhem in 2023 by performing a themed freestyle for Seth Rogen and Ice Cube. He did the same in 2024, this time promoting Bad Boys: Ride or Die with Will Smith and Martin Lawrence. He had previously performed at The Streamer Awards 2024.

== Personal life ==
Mack supported the 2019 Los Angeles Unified School District teachers' strike in a freestyle on Power 106.

Mack said on an episode of his podcast, Flow State, that the year 2025 was the most intense year of his life. On New Year's Eve, he rapped for Dick Clark's New Year's Rockin' Eve. Shortly afterward, during the Eaton Fire in early 2025, Mack's home was destroyed along with most of his possessions. He and his wife purchased a home on the East Coast, but Mack went on tour and wasn't able to settle into the home for several months. Later that year, Mack's wife gave birth to a baby daughter. Mack says they will raise the child on the East Coast.

== Influences and style ==
Mack is mainly influenced by golden age hip hop artists, although he has also said that jazz rap and trap have influenced him a lot as well. He has named Kendrick Lamar, Rakim, Ashanti, Nelly, Roy Ayers, Big L, Gift of Gab, Snoop Dogg, Jay-Z, Eminem, The Notorious B.I.G., MF Doom, Black Thought, Dr. Dre, Nas, Wu-Tang Clan, Gang Starr, A Tribe Called Quest, and De La Soul as influential to him. Amongst freestylers, he names Supernatural, MC Juice, Eyedea, and Freestyle Fellowship as inspirations.

== Discography ==
=== Studio albums ===
Title	Details
Contents Under Pressure	Released: January 18, 2019; Label: Self-released; Formats: Digital download

=== Extended plays ===
Title	Details
Rap Coltrane	Released: November 19, 2021; Label: Mush Man LLC; Formats: Digital download
Soulilloquies	Released: September 9, 2022; Label: Mush Man LLC; Formats: Digital download
The Process	Released: January 26, 2024; Label: Mush Man LLC; Formats: Digital download

=== Singles ===
Title	Year	Album
"Proof"	2017	Non-album singles
"Not Ready"	2017	Non-album singles
"On Lock"	2017	Non-album singles
"Next Gear"	2019	Contents Under Pressure
"Napoleon Hill"	2019	Contents Under Pressure
"90 Degrees"	2019	Non-album singles
"Day Zero"	2019	Non-album singles
"Cooking Up"	2019	Non-album singles
"2024"	2024	Non-album singles
"It Goes Deep"	2024	Non-album singles
"I Ain't Gotta Worry"	2024	Non-album singles
"Iconoclast"	2024	Non-album singles
"Plan In Motion"	2024	Non-album singles
"Prove It To Myself"	2024	Non-album singles
"Get Away From Everything"	2024	Non-album singles
"Nikola Tesla"	2024	Non-album singles
"Minotaur"	2024	Non-album singles
"Treat It Like A Hobby"	2024	Non-album singles
"Back On Mine"	2024	Non-album singles
"Bet The House"	2024	Non-album singles
"Shift The Market"	2024	Non-album singles
"No Regard"	2024	Non-album singles
"On Like That"	2024	Non-album singles
"Everything I Do Amazing"	2024	Non-album singles
"WYGDN"	2024	Non-album singles
"Tired As Fuck"	2024	Non-album singles
"Not The Same"	2024	Non-album singles
"So Low"	2024	Non-album singles
"Hadda Make A Change"	2024	Non-album singles
"Build My Tower High"	2024	Non-album singles
"Holdin The Wheel"	2024	Non-album singles
"One Foot In Front The Other"	2024	Non-album singles

== Awards and nominations ==
Year	Ceremony	Category	Nominee / work	Result	Ref.
2021	11th Streamy Awards	Best Collaboration	Harry Mack and Marcus Veltri – Pianist & Freestyle Rapper BLOW MINDS on Omegle ft. Marcus Veltri	Nominated	
2021	11th Streamy Awards	Live Show	Omegle Bars (Harry Mack)	Nominated	
