= Fuslie =

American live streamer (born 1992)

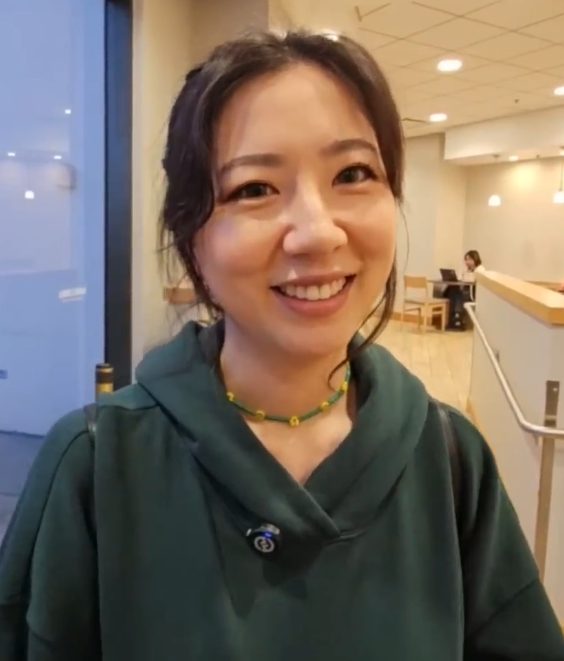
- Fuslie in 2024
- Born: Leslie Fu; November 23, 1992 (age 33); United States
- Education: University of California, Irvine (BS)
- Occupations: Live streamer; YouTuber; Musician
- Organization: 100 Thieves

Twitch information
- Channel: fuslie
- Years active: 2015–2022; 2024–present
- Genre: Gaming
- Followers: 1.2 million

YouTube information
- Channel: fuslie
- Years active: 2015–present
- Genres: Gaming; vlogs; react; music
- Subscribers: 891 thousand
- Views: 364 million
- Last updated: July 26, 2025
- Website: fuslie.com

Leslie Ann Fu, better known as fuslie, is an American live streamer, YouTuber and musician. She is a content creator for the gaming organization and lifestyle brand 100 Thieves.

== Early life ==
Leslie Ann Fu was born to Chinese parents. Fu has a brother named Nathaniel Fu. She attended Homestead High School in Cupertino, California. Fu graduated from the University of California, Irvine in 2014, earning a bachelor's degree in biological sciences. Fu briefly attended graduate school at the University of California, Los Angeles for teaching before dropping out to pursue streaming full-time.

== Career ==
Fu began streaming on Twitch in February 2015 after being introduced to the activity by her roommates. Before branching out towards a wider variety of games, she primarily streamed League of Legends. She briefly was a streamer for professional League of Legends teams Immortals and Phoenix1.

In December 2018, Fu, along with fellow Twitch streamer BoxBox, hosted a 4-day streaming boot camp titled Streamer Camp, an event aimed at improving the skills of up-and-coming Twitch streamers and content creators. A second season of the event was held in June 2019. A third season was scheduled to be held in 2020 but was canceled due to the COVID-19 pandemic.

In April 2019, Fu was featured in an advertisement for karaoke video game Twitch Sings.

Fu was one of many streamers affected by the large wave of DMCA takedown notices issued against Twitch in June 2020. After receiving two strikes, Fu criticized the platform's response to the situation saying, "On top of it being near impossible for me to delete 100,000 clips, the creator dashboard isn't loading any of my old clips. How am I supposed to protect myself here? This is an issue way bigger than me. Content creators aren't being informed by Twitch on the proper steps to protect themselves from this happening, and there has to be a better way to handle this than suddenly striking our accounts and banning us out of nowhere."

In June 2020, Fu participated in a Chess.com tournament for Twitch streamers titled PogChamps. She made it to the quarterfinals of the consolation bracket, where she lost to fellow streamer xQc. Fu would later be one of over 40 streamers featured on the cover of the August 2020 edition of Chess Life.

On September 2, 2020, Fu announced that she signed an exclusive contract with Twitch.

On March 26, 2021, Fu created the character “April Fooze” for the online modded Grand Theft Auto V roleplay server, NoPixel. As part of her character, Fu has released a number of collaborative songs under the name April Fooze, including “If You’re Broke I’m Busy (ft. Ryan King)” and “April’s Fool (ft. SocialTea and Ryan King)” between March - April, 2022. Fooze has also been featured on a number of tracks by other NoPixel music artists, such as “SUGRBABY” by Liz Anya and “SL*T4U” by the Bimbos.

On May 12, 2021, Fu joined the gaming organization and lifestyle brand 100 Thieves as a content creator.

On August 12, 2021, Fu starred in the music video for Sub Urban and Bella Poarch's song, "Inferno". She also participated in a stream promoting the video. That same day, she hit 1 million followers on Twitch.

On September 6, 2022, Fu announced that she would be leaving Twitch for an exclusive streaming contract on YouTube.

In July and August 2023, Fu participated in the PogChamps five chess tournament.

From July 27 to 30, 2023, Fu co-hosted the fourth season of Streamer Camp alongside fellow streamers BoxBox, QTCinderella, and Kkatamina.

On August 8, 2024, Fu announced on stream that she would be taking a hiatus from streaming after confirming that she had an "emotional affair" with fellow content creator NoahJ456, while he was still married. Fu returned to streaming on September 19, 2024. In October 2024, Fu announced that her YouTube streaming contract had expired and she will be simulcasting her live streams on both YouTube and Twitch.

== Philanthropy ==
In March 2019, Fu partnered with the North America Scholastic Esports Federation (NASEF) and the Anaheim Ducks hockey team in holding an NHL 19 tournament. The tournament gave away over $25,000 in scholarships and grants to high school students. Fu has also spoken to NASEF voicing her support for women in gaming.

On December 2, 2019, Fu held a charity fundraiser stream benefitting Stand Up to Cancer. Fu and her viewers raised over $30,000 for cancer research.

On October 19, 2021, Fu in collaboration with 100 Thieves hosted a charity fundraiser streamer for the National Breast Cancer Foundation, raising $55,000.

== Personal life ==
Fu dated former OfflineTV manager Edison Park, and the couple became engaged on April 7, 2019, before announcing their split in September 2021.

== Discography ==
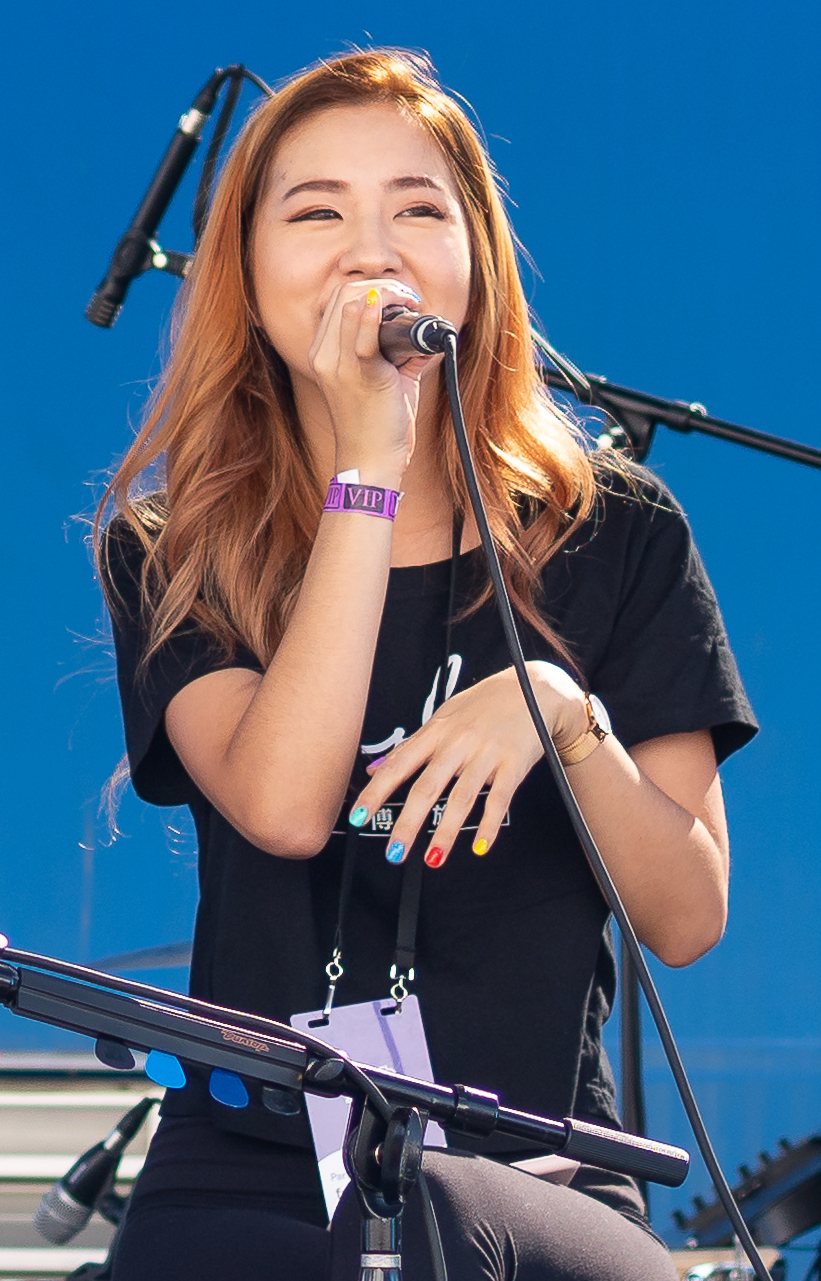
Fu performing at TwitchCon 2018

List of singles as lead and featured artist, showing year released and album name
Title	Album	Ref.
"Sabotage" (with Drew.0)	Non-album single	
"What If" (with StreamBeats Originals)	Demon	
"With you in the clouds" (with KevJumba)	Non-album singles	
"The Dawn" (with StreamBeats Originals)	Non-album singles	
"Already Missing You" (with StreamBeats Originals)	Non-album singles	
"Echoes" (with Valkyrae and Ylona Garcia)	Non-album singles	
"My Heaven" (with SABAI)	Demon	

== Filmography ==
Music videos
Year	Title	Artist(s)	Ref.
2021	"Inferno"	Bella Poarch and Sub Urban	
2024	"Echoes"	Valkyrae, Fuslie and Ylona Garcia	

== Awards and nominations ==
Ceremony	Year	Category	Result	Ref.
The Game Awards	2021	Content Creator of the Year	Nominated	
The Streamer Awards	2021	Best GTA Role-play Streamer	Nominated	
The Streamer Awards	2022	Best Role-Play Streamer	Nominated	
The Streamer Awards	2022	Best Philanthropic Stream Event (shared with the "Roomies")	Nominated	
The Streamer Awards	2023	Best Variety Streamer	Nominated	
The Streamer Awards	2026	Best Content Group (shared with "F.S.L.R.")	Nominated	
