= Ludwig Ahgren =

American YouTuber and twitch streamer (born 1995)

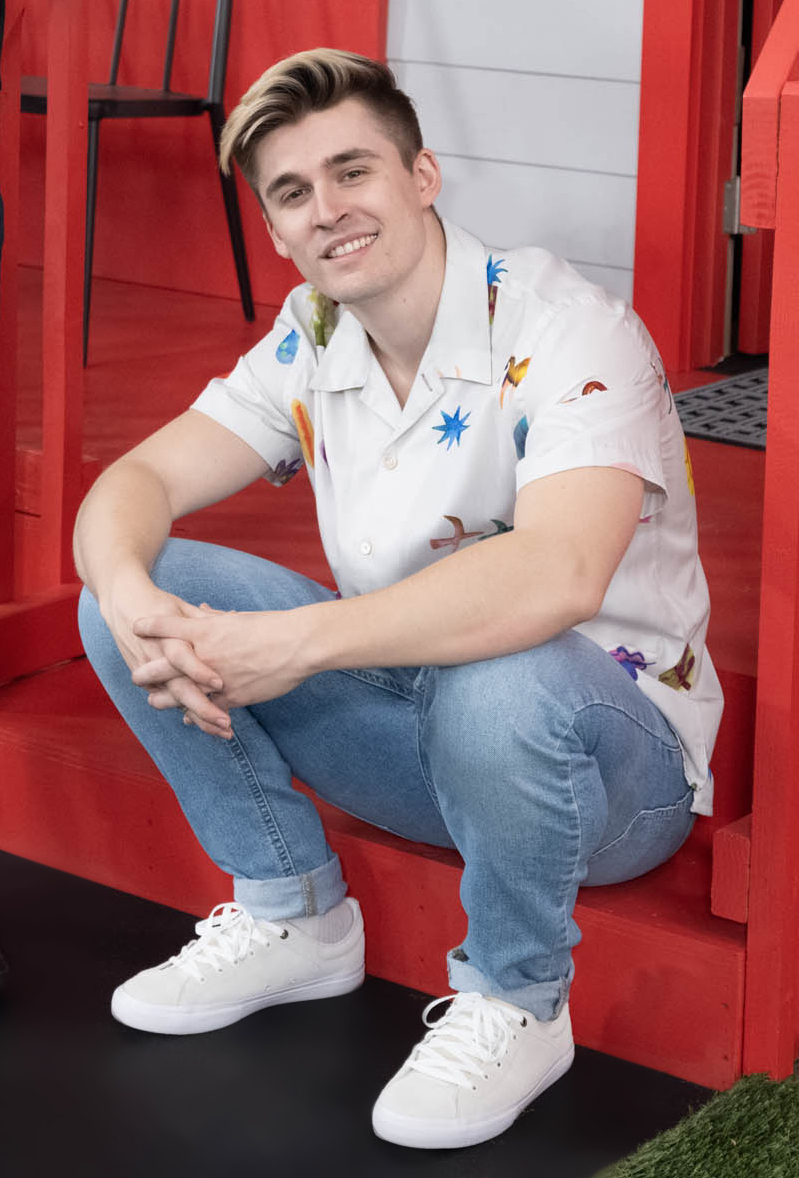
- Ahgren in 2023
- Born: Ludwig Anders Ahgren; July 6, 1995 (age 31); Hollis, New Hampshire, U.S.
- Education: Arizona State University (BA)
- Occupations: Live streamer; YouTuber; esports commentator; podcaster
- Spouse: QTCinderella (m. 2026)

Twitch information
- Channel: Ludwig
- Years active: 2013–2021; 2024–present
- Genres: Gaming; Just Chatting
- Games: League of Legends; Minecraft; Super Smash Bros. Melee
- Followers: 3.79 million

YouTube information
- Channels: Ludwig; Ludwin; Mogul Mail
- Years active: 2015–present
- Genres: Gaming, Comedy
- Subscribers: 7.1 million
- Views: 4.53 billion
- Last updated: November 1, 2026

Ludwig Anders Ahgren (/ˈɑːɡrɛn/; (Note: WIRED (January 4, 2023). Ludwig Answers the Web's Most Searched Questions | WIRED (Video) – via YouTube. Alt URL) born July 6, 1995), also known mononymously as Ludwig, is an American live streamer, YouTuber, podcaster, esports commentator, and competitor. He is best known for his live streams, which have been broadcast on Twitch from 2018 through late 2021, on YouTube from late 2021 until 2024, and again on Twitch since 2024. He broadcasts video game–related content, game shows, and contests. Ahgren is also known for his work as an esports commentator at various Super Smash Bros. Melee tournaments. He is a co-owner of the esports organization Shopify Rebellion. He began streaming full-time in 2019.

While holding a widely publicized "subathon" event, Ahgren became the most-subscribed Twitch streamer of all time in 2021, eventually reaching around 282,000 subscribers at its peak, beating the previous record set by fellow streamer Ninja. In 2021, Ahgren announced that he had signed an exclusive deal with YouTube Gaming. At the 2022 Streamer Awards, Ahgren won the award for "Streamer of the Year". He became a Red Bull athlete in 2024.

== Early life ==
Ludwig Anders Ahgren was born in Hollis, New Hampshire, on July 6, 1995, the son of a French mother and Swedish father. He attended Hollis Brookline High School and, for college, he attended Arizona State University, where he was an inaugural member of Tempe Late Night (later renamed to Tempe Underground), a stand-up, improv, and sketch comedy club. He graduated cum laude with degrees in English literature and journalism in 2017.

== Career ==
=== 2018–2021: Early Twitch career and initial popularity ===
Ahgren began live streaming on Twitch part-time on May 16, 2018, going full-time on February 16, 2019. During 2018 and 2019, Ahgren's stream had a relatively small audience, mostly streaming the video games Super Smash Bros. Melee, Mario Party 2, and Dark Souls. Since as early as June 2019, he has frequently made collaborative content with his wife and fellow streamer QTCinderella. On November 10, 2019, Ahgren set the world record for the button-mashing mini-game Domination from Mario Party 4. According to Polygon, Ahgren's record was faster than a tool-assisted speedrun bot; according to Kotaku, this is false, since the bot was capped at a score of 160, while Ahgren was playing on a modified version that removes the cap. Polygon's Owen S. Good said, "If aliens landed and I had to explain what video games are and why they are fun, I'd show them this. Take a bow, Ludwig."

In January 2020, Ahgren, among other Melee competitors and personalities, such as Mew2King and Plup, competed in an invitational tournament for Pokémon Sword and Shield by 2016 Pokémon World Champion, Wolfe Glick, where Ahgren finished first. In June 2020, Ahgren was invited to compete against other popular Twitch streamers in the amateur chess tournament PogChamps of Chess.com, placing second in the consolation bracket. Ahgren subsequently made an appearance on the cover of the August 2020 edition of Chess Life.

In December 2020, both Ahgren's YouTube channel and his Twitch channel reached one million followers; Cale Michael of Dot Esports credited his rapid growth to his "Twitch stream expanding, continued collaboration with other big creators, and his willingness to try new forms of content out both live and for his YouTube channel."

In January 2021, Ahgren began hosting a game show on Twitch, titled Hivemind, with fellow streamer MoistCr1tikal. In October 2021, Ahgren was among a multitude of streamers whose earnings from Twitch were revealed in a data breach; between August 2019 and October 2021, Ahgren had earned $3.3 million through Twitch, which Ahgren confirmed.

==== Subathon ====
On March 14, 2021, Ahgren held a subathon that ran for 30 days, ending on April 13, 2021. A "subathon", short for "subscription marathon", is a type of livestream on Twitch where every time a streamer receives a subscription—US$5 donations from viewers—more time is added to a descending timer. Once the timer reaches zero, the stream ends. Ahgren received around 282,000 subscriptions during his subathon, breaking the previous record set in 2018 by Tyler "Ninja" Blevins of the most concurrent subscribers on Twitch. His record lasted until February 2023, when it was broken by Kai Cenat.

=== 2021–2024: Move to YouTube ===
On November 29, 2021, Ahgren announced he would depart from live streaming on Twitch and moved to YouTube Gaming on November 30. He announced this with a short comedy sketch, where he blew up a purple car symbolizing Twitch. According to Dot Esports, Ahgren cited his move to YouTube as one of the reasons why Twitch later relaxed its exclusivity rules for its partnered streamers.

In December 2021, Ahgren received two DMCA-related bans, temporarily suspending his streams. On September 11, 2022, Ahgren was banned for a third time during a stream in which he deliberately played the copyrighted song "Go!!!" to see how quickly he would be banned. He was banned after one minute and thirty-one seconds, which he claimed was a "world record".

On July 2, 2022, Ahgren hosted an in-person version of his game show, Mogul Money Live, to over 5,000 people at the YouTube Theater. Contestants included Pokimane, xQc, Sykkuno, Mizkif, Sodapoppin, and Fuslie, among others.

On September 23, Ahgren announced a chess boxing event, the Mogul Chessboxing Championship, that was held on December 11, in the Galen Center in Los Angeles; It featured both streamers and professional chess players. In the event, Ahgren was both co-host and a participant in a surprise chess-slap match with Connor Colquhoun.

From October 21 to 23, Ahgren organized an invitational tournament for Super Smash Bros. Melee and Super Smash Bros. Ultimate in Las Vegas, Nevada, with 32-player brackets and a prize pool of $30,002 for both games, which was increased to $52,502 due to a cross-promotion with Capital One. The event was broadcast across Ahgren's and Alpharad's channels. On October 20, Ahgren revealed that a major sponsor had backed out at the last minute. YouTuber MrBeast signed on as a sponsor through his company Feastables. According to Ahgren and tournament organizer Aiden 'Calvin' McCaig, the event cost $200,000 to produce.

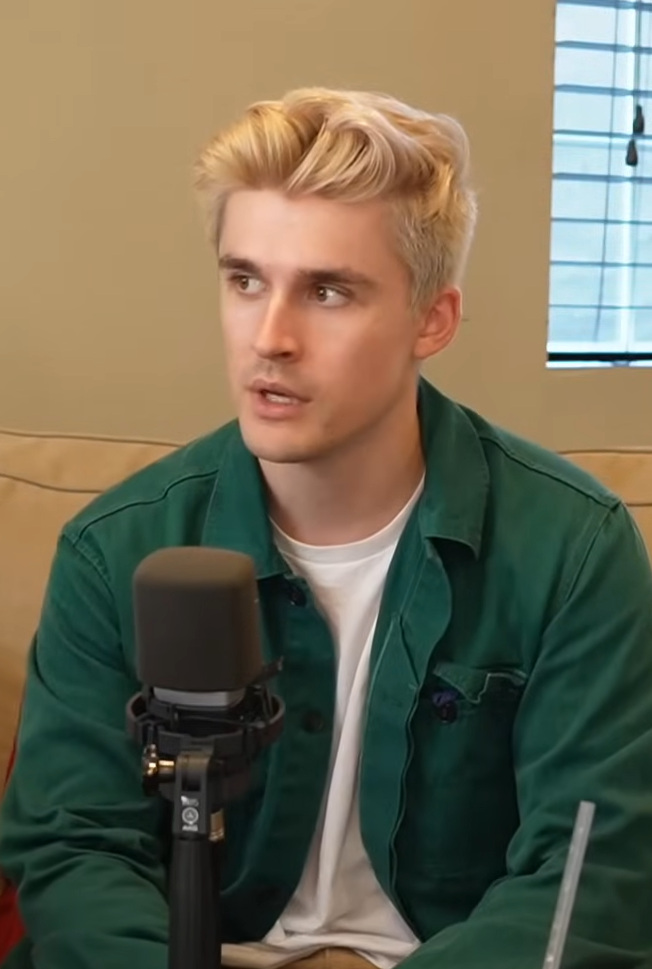
Ahgren during an interview in 2022

Ahgren hosted another Smash invitational, the Scuffed World Tour, on December 18, in light of community uproar surrounding Nintendo and Panda Global (a tournament organizer) due to the cancellation of the 2022 Smash World Tour Championships. Intending to rival Panda's postponed Panda Cup Finale, which was to be held on the same weekend, Ahgren invited the top sixteen Melee and Ultimate players from Smash World Tour 2022 to compete. The tournament's primary goal was raising money to support VGBootCamp, who were the organizers of Smash World Tour.

In March 2023, Ahgren released what would later become his most viewed video titled, "This Joke ALWAYS Works." As of June 2026, the video has received 49 million views. In the video, Ahgren tells a Japanese man, "僕のちんちん — 小さいです" (Boku no chinchin — chīsaidesu). Text in the video states the phrase translates to "I have a small d*ck [sic]."

In September 2023, Ahgren hosted a livestreamed gaming tournament in collaboration with YouTube called World's Greatest, in which he invited 17 participants to compete in various games, including but not limited to Street Fighter 6, Minecraft, Tetris, Fortnite, and Trackmania.

On July 13, 2024, Ahgren appeared in a MrBeast video titled "50 YouTubers Fight for $1,000,000". From August 17 to 18, Ahgren hosted a livestreamed athletic competition called Ludwig's Streamer Games, where content creators competed in a mix of traditional track and field events alongside schoolyard games with a twist, including the 1m + 99m Dash, Gymnastics, and the Tungsten Cube Toss. The event featured content creators from gaming organizations such as FaZe Clan, 100 Thieves, OTV, Red Bull, and more. In December 2024, the event won Best Streamed Event at The Streamer Awards.

=== 2024–present: Return to Twitch ===
On November 30, 2024, Ahgren announced that his YouTube live streaming contract had ended. On December 8, 2024, Ahgren announced his return to Twitch for the first time in three years.

In March 2025, Ahgren and fellow YouTuber Michael Reeves went on a journey across Japan, which was documented through a series of daily vlogs, titled "Tip To Tip". They traveled on motorcycles without the use of smartphones, maps, or expressways. The duo began at Cape Sata, the southernmost point of Kyushu, and reached Cape Sōya, the northernmost point of Hokkaido, fourteen days later. On their journey they encountered many friendly locals who helped them navigate to their destination.

On June 22, 2025, Ahgren hosted a Mario Kart World tournament, known as the Beerio Kart World Cup, in which participants had to drink an entire can of beer before they could finish a race. During the livestreamed event, professional Smash Bros. Melee player Mango was seen touching other participants inappropriately and walking around shirtless. The livestream showed Mango dry-humping creators such as Maya Higa, Emily Zhang, and Cinna, who called him out for his inappropriate behavior. On June 23, Ahgren condemned Mango's behavior and apologized to participants who were affected, while confirming that Mango was banned from all future events produced by Mogul Moves. However, Ahgren himself has also faced criticism for this incident, with several people, including Mango's wife Lauren, accusing him of enabling Mango's alcoholism.

In March 2026, Ahgren and Reeves filmed a second series of Tip To Tip. This time the pair traveled across China, starting their journey in the south in Yangjiang, Guangdong, and ending in Erenhot, a city on the China–Mongolia border. In the first episode titled, "Crossing China with no map," the pair stated the rules for the vlog series were, "no highway, no map, no smartphone." This presented a considerable challenge as neither spoke more than a few words of Mandarin. The pair described their lack of Chinese language ability in detail in a March 2026 video titled, "We Tried to Learn Chinese... It Was a Disaster." In particular, 'jiǔdiàn' (酒店) the Mandarin word for 'hotel' was a repeated source of confusion. Subtitles in the video series indicated their pronunciation was closer to 'jiǔ diǎn' (九点) (nine o'clock), 'zhūjuàn' (猪圈) (pig spot), or 'zìdiǎn' (字典) (dictionary). The pair completed their trip in sixteen days, driving over 4,000 kilometers.

== Other ventures ==
=== Music ===
Schlatt's Basement
The tenth track on the album Lud and Schlatt Crossing by Lud and Schlatts Musical Emporium. Music by Phillip Milman in 2023; funded by Ludwig Ahgren and Jschlatt.

In December 2020, Ahgren released a Christmas album, A Very Mogul Christmas, to allow streamers to listen to Christmas music without receiving DMCA strikes.

On September 28, 2022, Ahgren and jschlatt, a fellow content creator, founded the YouTube channel "Lud and Schlatts Musical Emporium", a project to release royalty-free recordings of famous compositions and two original songs in the style of Nintendo video game music for use in content creation.

=== The Yard podcast ===
In July 2021, Ahgren announced the launch of his new podcast called The Yard podcast with co-hosts Nick Vercillo, Aiden McCaig, and Anthony "Slime" Bruno. In April 2022, YouTube CEO Susan Wojcicki appeared as a guest on the podcast. On December 7, 2022, they announced on Twitter the launch of season 2 of the podcast with a brand new setup. On July 27, 2023, the podcast was nominated for the 13th Streamy Awards in the podcast category.

=== Offbrand ===
On September 27, 2022, Ahgren announced the founding of the creative agency Offbrand, along with fellow streamers Brandon 'Atrioc' Ewing, Nathan Stanz, and Nick Allen. The company held their first game show called Juiced, a game show hosted by Canadian Twitch streamer Félix 'xQc' Lengyel. On June 12, 2023, Twitch streamer and YouTuber Jerma985, joined as the company's chief creative officer (CCO). In June 2024, Ahgren announced that the company is becoming a worker-owned cooperative, which will allow all of its staff members to have a say in its operations and corporate decision-making. Later that month, after a year serving as the company's chief creative officer, Jerma985 left the company due to personal reasons. On December 13, 2024, it was announced the studio had closed due to failure to make a sustainable business model.

=== Offbrand Games ===
On June 7, 2024, Ahgren and PirateSoftware's CEO, Jason "Thor" Hall, announced the launch of their new game publisher company called Offbrand Games. Their first release was Rivals of Aether II, which had a Windows release on October 23, 2024. On July 2, 2025, Hall announced his departure from Offbrand Games after alleging several of the company's recent releases were review-bombed by players following controversy related to his criticism of the Stop Killing Games movement.

=== Other ===
In May 2022, Ahgren announced the launch of his new company called Truffle, a browser extension focused on fixing problems within the livestreaming space.

On October 15, 2022, Ahgren announced the launch of Swipe, his bidet product line.

In January 2023, Ahgren announced that he had joined as a co-owner of Moist Esports, an American esports organization founded by fellow streamer MoistCr1tikal. In January 2025, Ahgren and White would become co-owners of Shopify Rebellion, effectively merging Moist Esports with the Canadian organization.

== Philanthropy ==
In November 2020, after the Melee tournament The Big House 10 received a cease and desist letter from Nintendo, Ahgren announced the Ludwig Ahgren Championship Series 3, an impromptu charity tournament. Taking place between December 20 and 21, it raised $261,668 for Games for Love.

In February 2021, Ahgren paid and donated $53,000 to hang out with Shroud at a charity auction stream for the fundraiser for Alveus Sanctuary, a non-profit exotic animal sanctuary and virtual education center, owned by fellow Twitch streamer Maya Higa.

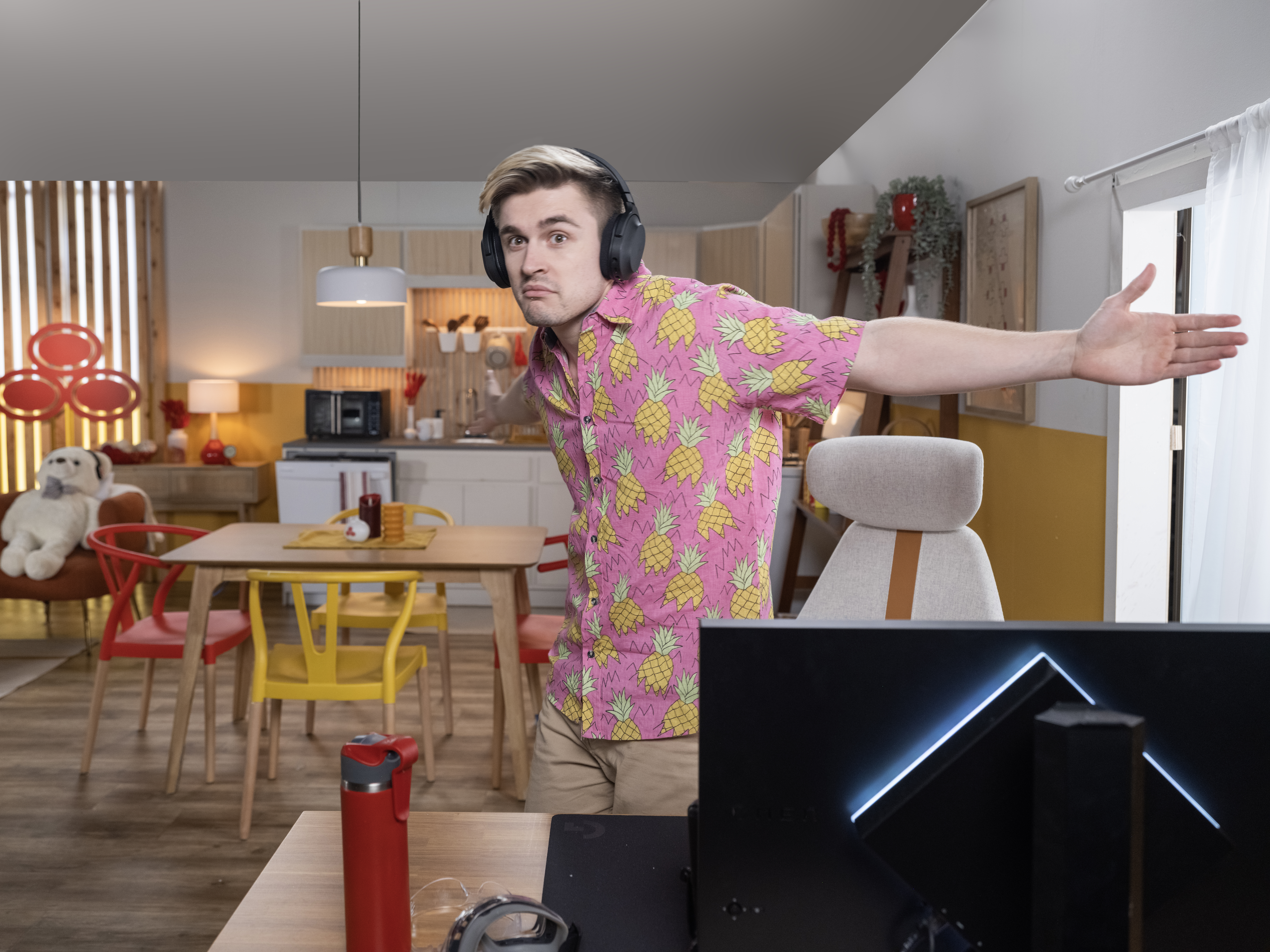
Ahgren during a promotional shoot for State Farm Gamerhood Challenge charity event in 2023

In January 2022, Ahgren held a charity auction stream where he auctioned his stream-related items such as his YouTooz figure, custom controllers, his Cars bed, where he slept during his 2021 subathon, and his silver YouTube play button to his viewers. He managed to raise more than $100,000 for No Kid Hungry.

At DreamHack Atlanta 2022 in November 2022, Ahgren raised more than $315,000 for Alveus Sanctuary and No Kid Hungry through a 50-hour glass box stream. According to Stream Hatchet, the stream received 882,000 hours of viewing and peaked at 57,500 watchers at the end.

In June 2023, Ahgren participated in the 5-week State Farm Gamerhood Challenge charity event along with content creators such as Ninja, Jessica Blevins, Typical Gamer, Krystalogy, ImDontai, and BlackKrystel. Ahgren and Typical Gamer ended up winning the event and raising $100,000 for their non-profit of choice, Feeding America.

From May 31 to June 2, 2024, Ahgren organized and hosted Ludwig Fast 50, a livestreamed speedrunning charity event featuring popular content creators and speed runners attempting to break speed run records in a variety of retro and new games. By the end of the event, they managed to raise over $251,924 for Wings For Life and No Kid Hungry.

In November 2025, Ahgren hosted a charity stream raising over $105,000 for The Trevor Project, following the death of one of his long-time transgender viewers.

== Personal life ==
Ahgren began dating fellow streamer QTCinderella in 2020. They reside together in Los Angeles. They got engaged in July 2026 and got married that October.

== Awards and nominations ==
Awards and nominations received by Ludwig Ahgren
Ceremony	Year	Category	Work	Result	Ref.
Esports Awards	2021	Streamer of the Year	Himself	Nominated	
Esports Awards	2023	Esports Personality of the Year	Himself	Nominated	
The Game Awards	2022	Content Creator of the Year	Himself	Won	
Grindr Unwrapped	2024	Gaymer of the Year	Himself	Won	
The Streamer Awards	2021	Best Variety Streamer	Himself	Nominated	
The Streamer Awards	2021	Streamer of the Year	Himself	Won	
The Streamer Awards	2022	League of Their Own	Himself	Nominated	
The Streamer Awards	2022	Best Streamed Event	Mogul Chessboxing Championship	Won	
The Streamer Awards	2023	Best Variety Streamer	Himself	Nominated	
The Streamer Awards	2023	Best Streamed Event	Creator Dodgeball World Championship	Won	
The Streamer Awards	2024	Best Streamed Event	Streamer Games	Won	
The Streamer Awards	2025	Best Streamed Event	Streamer Games	Nominated	
The Streamer Awards	2026	Best Streamed Event	Streamer Games	Nominated	
The Streamer Awards	2026	Best Content Group	F.S.L.R.	Nominated	
Streamy Awards	2022	Streamer of the Year	Himself	Nominated	
Streamy Awards	2022	Collaboration	My Gameshow Broke YouTube	Nominated	
Streamy Awards	2022	Variety Streamer	Himself	Won	
Streamy Awards	2023	Streamer of the Year	Himself	Nominated	
Streamy Awards	2023	Variety Streamer	Himself	Nominated	
Streamy Awards	2023	Podcast	The Yard (Note: co-hosted by Ahgren, Anthony "Slime" Bruno, Nicolas "Falco" Vercillo and Aiden "Calvin" McCaig)	Nominated	

== Filmography ==
=== Music videos ===
List of music video appearances by Ludwig Ahgren
Year	Title	Artist(s)	Role	Ref.
2020	"Baby It's Cold Outside"	Himself and QTCinderella	Himself	
2021	"Inferno"	Sub Urban and Bella Poarch	Bellboy	
2022	"Dolls"	Bella Poarch	Himself	
2023	"Con Te Partirò"	Himself	Himself	

=== Video games ===
Year	Title	Role	Ref.
2026	Road to Empress II	Prince of Fuling	

== Discography ==
=== Albums ===
- A Very Mogul Christmas (2020)

=== Singles ===
- Con Te Partirò (2023)
