= 2021 Streamer Awards =

Live streaming awards ceremony

- Awarded for: Excellence in live streaming
- Date: March 12, 2022
- Location: Fonda Theatre; Los Angeles, California
- Country: United States
- Hosted by: QTCinderella; Maya Higa
- Preshow hosts: NymN; Slime; JHBTeam
- Acts: List: ARIatHOME; Koaster; Sordiway; TJBrown; Violin_Tim; Mitch Jones; Kala

Highlights
- Most awards: Jerma985 (2)
- Most nominations: List: aceu; Disguised Toast; Ibai Llanos; Jerma985; LilyPichu; Ludwig Ahgren; Mizkif; PaymoneyWubby; Pokimane; Ranboo; Scarra; shroud; Sykkuno; TenZ; xQc (2 each)
- Streamer of the Year: Ludwig Ahgren

Streaming coverage
- Network: Twitch
- Runtime: 123 minutes
- Viewership: 381,436 peak viewers
- Produced by: Jacob Komar & Alex Herreid
- Directed by: Bobby Sutherland

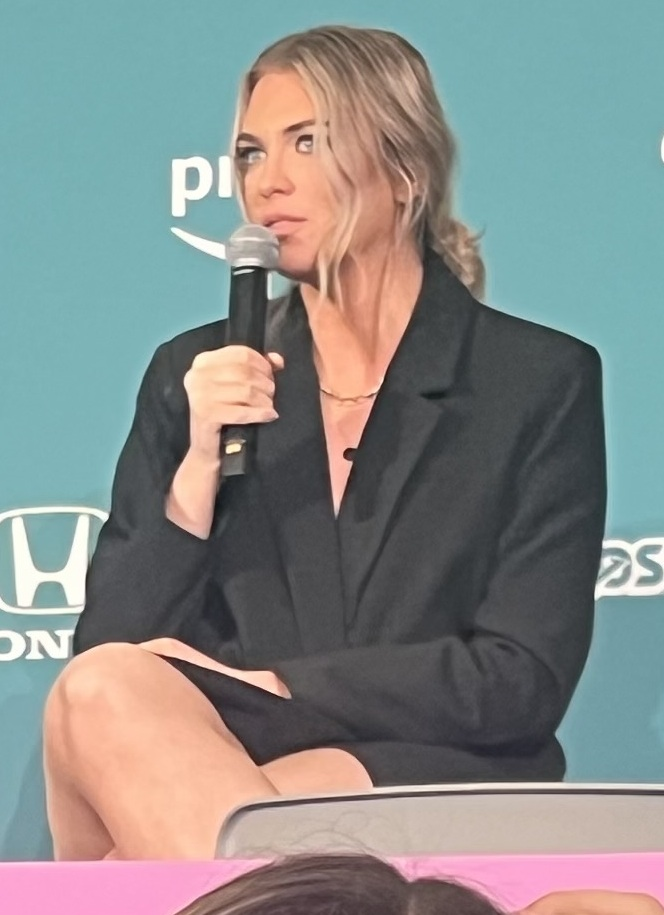
QTCinderella hosted the show

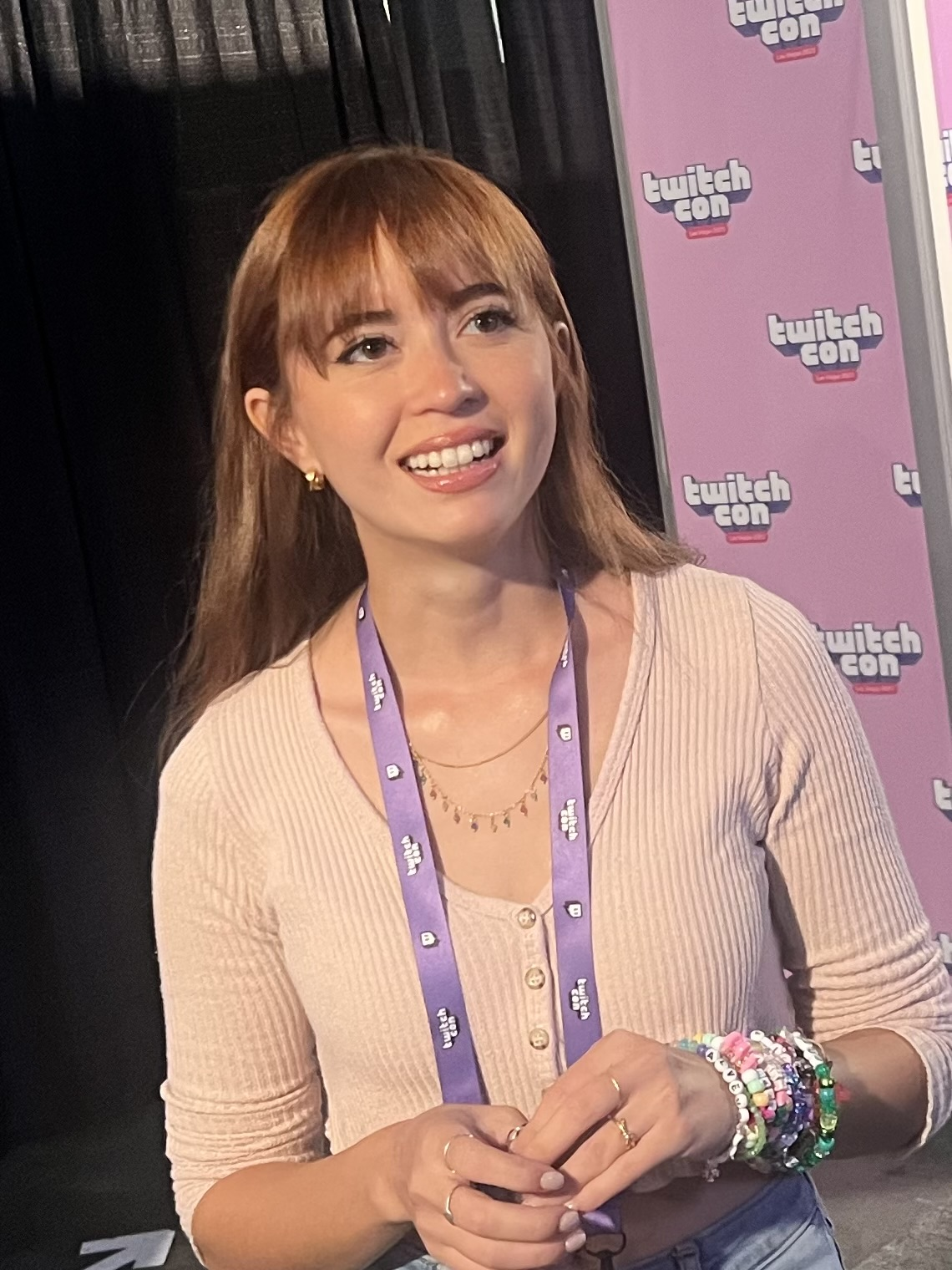
Maya Higa hosted the show

The 2021 Streamer Awards (Note: Was referred to as the 2022 Streamer Awards when airing. Name was changed after the 2024 Streamer Awards.) ceremony took place on March 12, 2022, at the Fonda Theatre in Los Angeles, California. During the ceremony, awards were handed out in 27 categories honoring the best in live streaming in 2021. The ceremony, broadcast live on Twitch, was the first edition of the Streamer Awards, and hosted by live streamers QTCinderella and Maya Higa.

Ludwig Ahgren won the inaugural award for Streamer of the Year. Jerma985 won the most awards with two, and tied for most nominations with aceu, Disguised Toast, Ibai Llanos, LilyPichu, Ludwig Ahgren, Mizkif, PaymoneyWubby, Pokimane, Ranboo, Scarra, shroud, Sykkuno, TenZ, and xQc, with two each. The broadcast drew a peak of 381,436 concurrent viewers.

Streamers were interviewed on the red carpet by NymN, Slime, and JHBTeam.

== Performers ==
The 2021 Streamer Awards featured musical performances from

Performers at the 2021 Streamer Awards
Artist(s)	Song(s)
ARIatHOME	Freestyled song
Koaster & Sordiway	Medley of various original songs and covers.
TJBrown & Violin_Tim	
Mitch Jones & Kala	"West Coast Tragedy" "No In-Between"

== Winners and nominees ==
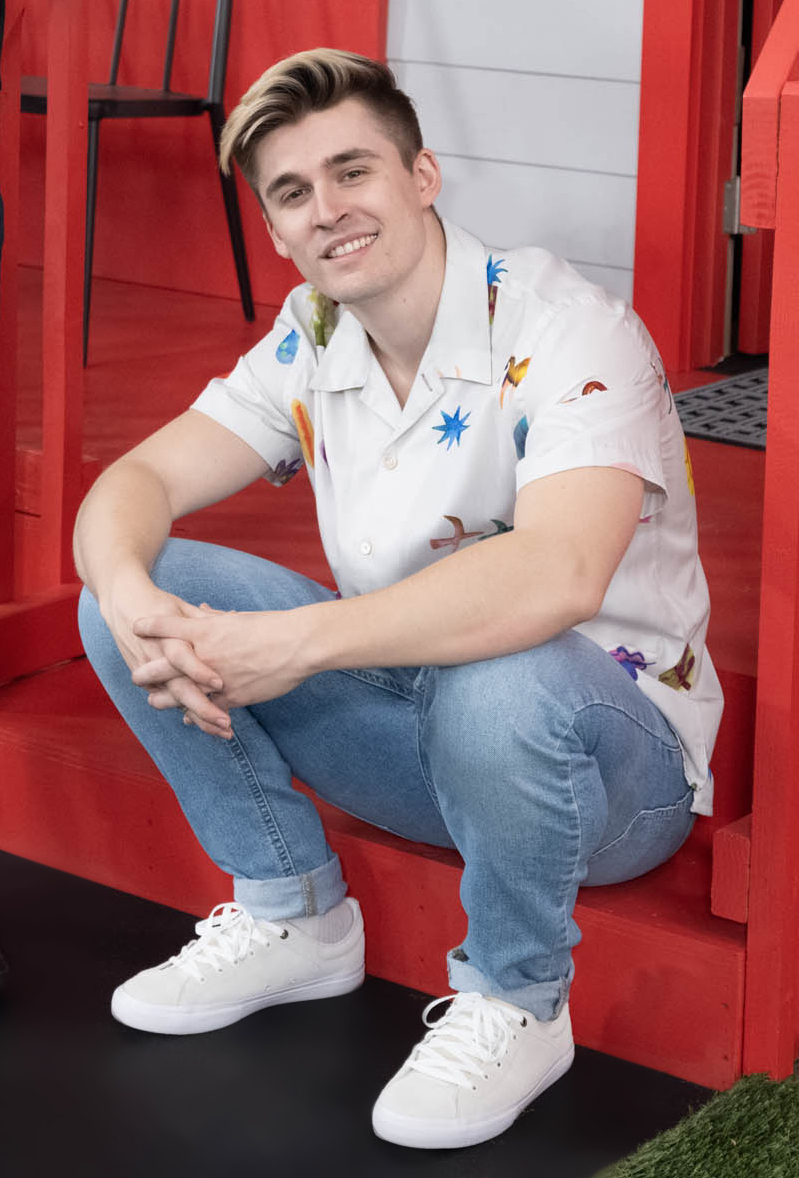
Ludwig Ahgren, winner of the Streamer of the Year award

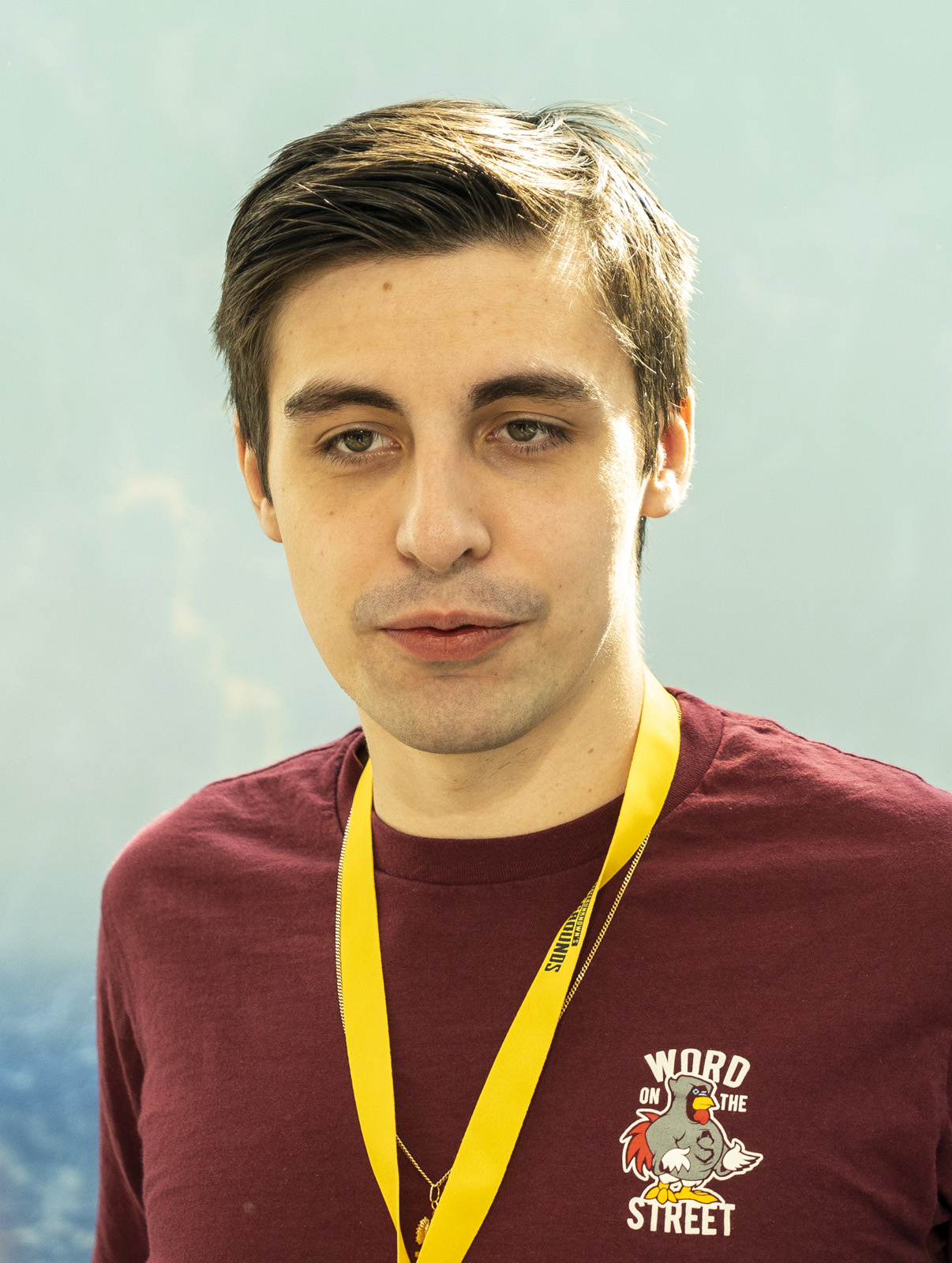
Shroud, winner of the Gamer of the Year award

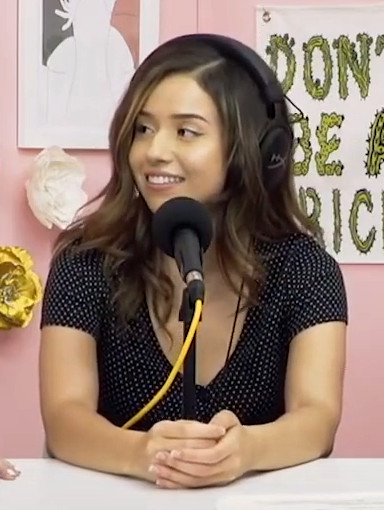
Pokimane, winner of the Legacy award

The categories "Best Political Streamer" and "Best Sports Game Streamer" were removed during the nomination process due to a lack of votes.

This is the only year that the Legacy Award was voted on. In all future shows the award would be voted on by The Streamer Awards voting panel.

Winners are listed first and in boldface.

**Best Battle Royale Streamer**: **aceu**; LuluLuvely; NICKMERCS; TSM_ImperialHal	**Best MMORPG Streamer**: **Asmongold**; EsfandTV; itswill; richwcampbell
**Best Role-Play Streamer**: **cyr – Rust**; Critical Role – Dungeons & Dragons; MurderCrumpet – VRChat; roflgator – VRChat	**Best FPS Streamer**: **tarik**; shroud; supertf; TenZ
**Best Super Smash Bros. Streamer**: **mang0**; Hungrybox; iBDW; Leffen	**Best Chess Streamer**: **BotezLive**; akaNemsko; GMHikaru; GothamChess
**Best Strategy Game Streamer**: **Disguised Toast**; boxbox; Northernlion; Scarra	**Best Speedrun Streamer**: **SmallAnt**; Atrioc; Simply; Wirtual
**Best ASMR Streamer**: **Amouranth**; FoxenKin; Katrine; SkepticalPickle	**Best VTuber Streamer**: **CodeMiko**; Ironmouse; Nyanners; Veibae
**Best Music Streamer**: **lilypichu**; ARIatHOME; SethDrums; TPAIN	**Best IRL Streamer**: **HAchubby**; jakenbakeLIVE; Jinnytty; robcdee
**Best League of Legends Streamer**: **loltyler1**; Doublelift; Emiru; lilypichu	**Best Minecraft Streamer**: **TommyInnit**; forsen; RanbooLive; Tubbo
**Best Valorant Streamer**: **iiTzTimmy**; pokimane; Punz; QuarterJade	**Best GTA RP Streamer**: **buddha**; fuslie; Sykkuno; xQcOW
**Best Philanthropic Streamer**: **jacksepticeye**; DrLupo; HealthyGamer_GG; RanbooLive	**Stream Game of the Year**: **Minecraft**; Apex Legends; Grand Theft Auto V; Valorant
**Best Variety Streamer**: **moistcr1tikal**; DisguisedToast; Ludwig; Valkyrae	**Best Just Chatting Streamer**: **Mizkif**; BruceDropEmOff; HasanAbi; PaymoneyWubby
**Best Streamed Event**: **The Jerma985 Dollhouse – Jerma985**; Balloon World Cup – ibai; The Price is Scuffed – PaymoneyWubby; Shit Con – Nmplol	**Best Content Organization**: **One True King (OTK)**; 100 Thieves; NRG Esports; OfflineTV
**Rising Star Award**: **Stanz**; frogan; PurpleCliffe; Zoil	**League of Their Own**: **Jerma985**; ibai; Kitboga; TheSushiDragon
**Legacy Award**: **pokimane**; Scarra; sodapoppin; summit1g	**Gamer of the Year**: **shroud**; aceu; iiTzTimmy; TenZ
**Streamer of the Year**: **Ludwig**; Mizkif; Sykkuno; xQcOW	
