= One True King =

Content organization based in Austin, Texas

OTK Media (One True King)
- Full name: OTK Media, Inc.
- Short name: OTK
- Founded: October 11, 2020; 6 years ago
- Based in: Austin, Texas, U.S.
- Members: Sodapoppin; Nmplol; Cyr; Esfand
- Director general: Tips Out
- Partners: WePlay Studios; Mad Mushroom; Starforge Systems; Mythic Talent; Gamersupps; Seventy-Eight Strange
- Website: www.otknetwork.com

Twitch information
- Channels: OTKnetwork Associated channels; EsfandTV; tipsoutbaby; Nmplol; cyr; sodapoppin
- Followers: 315,345

YouTube information
- Channels: OTK Associated channels; Mizkif; Esfand; Tips Out; Nmplol; Cyr Twitch; Sodapoppin
- Subscribers: 605,000 (main channel)
- Views: 41.4 million (main channel)
- Last updated: April 30, 2025

OTK Media, Inc., doing business as One True King, is an American media organization based in Austin, Texas. The organization primarily focuses on online content creation and has previously competed professionally in World of Warcraft.

== History ==
=== 2020–2021: Founding and initial growth ===
One True King, commonly referred to as OTK, was formed on October 11, 2020, by content creators Asmongold, Mizkif, Esfand, Rich Campbell, and Tips Out. In their first video, founding member Asmongold stated, "We came up with this idea of making an org, and building the org around our friends – building the org around friendship in general." The organization has been described by its members as being more of a media production company and lifestyle brand as opposed to being confined to any one game or section on Twitch. The organization has also gained notability for not receiving major backing from corporations as opposed to traditional esports teams.

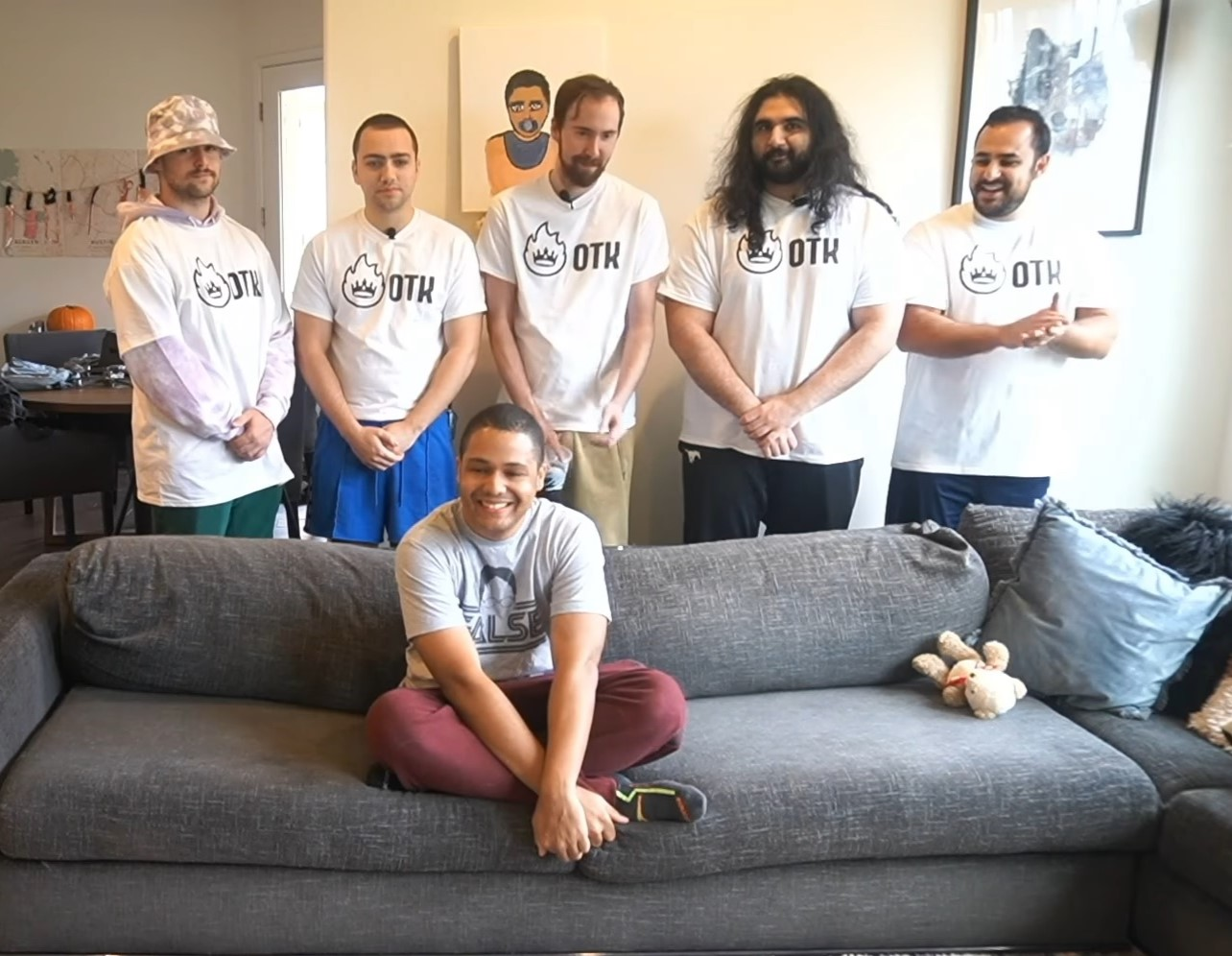
One True King in October 2020 announcing Nmplol as their newest member and co-owner. From left: Rich Campbell, Mizkif, Nmplol (seated), Asmongold, Esfand, and Tips Out.

Alongside the group's initial announcement, the organization unveiled its professional World of Warcraft roster. The original roster consisted of Trill, Mes, Cdew, and Samiyam. The team competed at Blizzard-sanctioned events for one season during the Shadowlands expansion. The group also announced its partnership with Artesian Builds, a pre-built PC company. On October 27, 2020, the organization announced the addition of streamer Nick Polom, also known by his online alias Nmplol, as a content creator and co-owner. In December 2020, OTK partnered with Complexity Gaming's World of Warcraft team in providing coverage of the game's Race to World First event, holding daily roundtable discussions about the race.

On October 11, 2021, on the one-year anniversary of the organization, One True King announced that Cyr would be joining the organization as a content creator. One month later, on November 21, 2021, One True King announced that Tectone would be joining the organization as a content creator.

=== 2022–present: New members, other ventures, and controversies ===
On January 2, 2022, One True King announced that Emiru would be joining the organization. On March 2, 2022, One True King announced that they had parted ways with Artesian Builds, following the company's giveaway controversy. One True King won the "Best Content Organization" award at The Streamer Awards on March 12, 2022. On March 27, 2022, One True King announced that BruceDropEmOff would be joining the organization as a content creator. On July 21, 2022 One True King announced that Sodapoppin would be joining the organization as a content creator and co-owner.

On September 19, 2022, Mizkif was accused by fellow Twitch streamer Trainwreckstv of downplaying and covering up an incident where his roommate and fellow streamer CrazySlick allegedly sexually assaulted female streamer AdrianahLee. Later that day, streamer Ice Poseidon, whom Mizkif worked with during his early streaming career, published a set of comments made by Mizkif from 2018 to 2019, characterized as racist and homophobic. The following day, as a result of the aforementioned incidents, Mizkif was placed on leave by One True King. On December 31, 2022, One True King released a statement about the allegation of Mizkif covering up an incident of sexual assault. According to the Texas-based law firm Jackson Walker, the investigation's counsel did not find direct evidence that Mizkif attempted to minimize or cover up sexual assault, as alleged. His status as an OTK member was reinstated. Later on January 2, 2023, Mizkif uploaded a video apologizing for the "insensitive" and "tone-deaf" behavior he displayed in a broadcast from early October.

On December 16, 2022, co-owner Rich Campbell announced his resignation from the organization in light of sexual assault allegations. On December 23, the official OTK Twitter account announced that jschlatt would be departing the organization. He will continue as an advisor for the YouTube team and have a stake in Starforge Systems.

On January 24, 2023, BruceDropEmOff left the organization. Three days later, he was indefinitely suspended from Twitch, citing ban evasion. On January 31, 2023, Emiru was announced as a new co-owner of the organization. She was previously in the organization solely as a content creator. It was also announced on the same day that ExtraEmily had joined the organization as a content creator.

On February 5, 2024, One True King announced that Will Neff would be joining the organization as a content creator. On October 16, 2024, Asmongold announced he was "stepping away" from his leadership roles at OTK and Starforge Systems following backlash over his comments on Palestinians affected by the Gaza war. On November 1, 2024, Tectone left the organization after the expiration of his three-year contract, which he decided not to renew.

On February 21, 2025, Asmongold announced on his stream that he had left the organization. On May 30, 2025, Neff announced on Twitter that he would be leaving One True King. In an October 25, 2025 livestream, Emiru accused Mizkif of misconduct, including unwanted physical contact, emotional abuse, and stalking. Emiru and Mizkif were in a relationship for several years, ending in 2024. According to Emiru, Mizkif threatened to retaliate if she ever spoke about the situation. Mizkif denied the more serious allegations and disputed some aspects of Emiru's account. In response, on October 27, 2025, One True King publicly disclosed on Twitter that Mizkif was terminated from the organization "some time ago" and that he holds no stake in the organization or any of its affiliated companies. Following, Mizkif filed a federal lawsuit against Emiru, Asmongold, OTK Media Inc., Mythic Talent Management Inc., and King Gaming Labs Inc for reputational harm, lost earnings, and emotional distress.

== Businesses and partnership ==
In June 2022, OTK announced a partnership with content production company WePlay Esports. The first event held under the partnership was the "OTK Games Expo", which showcased nearly 30 video games from various indie developers.

On August 7, 2022, OTK, along with YouTuber and Twitch streamer MoistCr1tikal, announced the founding of Starforge Systems, a technology company focused on building computers that was quickly met with backlash due to the allegedly high prices of their products. The company responded by decreasing their prices by $100. It was also announced that former Artesian Builds COO, now defunct pre-build PC company, Nick Dankner, will be the CEO of the company.

OTK announced the founding of Mythic Talent, the company's talent management company in February 2023. It was co-founded by OTK members Asmongold and TipsOut with William Lucas, formerly of Tempo Storm and the AFK Agency, as the CEO.

On June 2023, OTK announced the launch of game publishing company Mad Mushroom during the OTK Games Expo. Mike “Sibs” Silbowitz, formerly of Activision Blizzard, Square Enix and KRAFTON, initially served as the company’s lead advisor before being appointed CEO on August 10, 2023.

== Shows ==
OTK Schooled is a quiz game show created and hosted by Twitch streamer and fellow OTK member Mizkif, produced by One True King, that tests the knowledge of its contestants with school-related questions. The game show is frequently compared to the American gameshow franchise Are You Smarter than a 5th Grader?. The game show gained popularity because of several cheating controversies that happened during the show.

OTK Game Day is a weekly sports show hosted by Twitch streamer and fellow OTK member Nmplol and One True King, where OTK members go up against other streamers in various physical team-based sports.

On November 9, 2021, Mizkif and One True King announced a new game show called OTK Parasocial, a game show that appears to be in the style of Family Feud, an American television game show, prompting players to “guess the most popular answers to questions.”

== World of Warcraft ==
In January 2021, the organization's World of Warcraft team participated in the first edition of the Shadowlands Arena World Championship. They finished 3rd among North American teams. At Cup 2, One True King made it to the finals of the North American bracket, losing to Kawhi 1–4. At Cup 3, One True King made it to the semi-finals, losing to Cloud9 0–3. At the fourth and final cup of season one, One True King made it to the quarterfinals, losing to Charlotte Phoenix 1–3. The team finished second in the standings with 300 points, qualifying them for the Regional Circuit Championships. One True King finished the circuit with 8 points, tying for the 3rd place spot in North America with Golden Guardians and advancing them to the Arena World Championship Season 1 Finals. They made it to the semi-finals, losing to Cloud9 and finishing the season in 3rd place.

On June 11, 2021, Cdew announced via Twitter that the organization had decided not to renew the teams' contracts for the upcoming expansion.

== Philanthropy ==
One True King has held several charity streams benefiting the non-profit organization Games for Love. Their first charity stream took place on November 23, 2020. Over $250,000 was raised through opening rare Pokémon cards. The stream averaged 70,000 viewers. A second charity stream for Games for Love took place on March 22, 2021, raising $600,000. Their third charity stream took place over two days from June 22–23, 2021, raising $593,597.

In March 2022, One True King held two charity streams benefiting relief efforts for those affected by the 2022 Russian invasion of Ukraine, raising over $500,000.

On April 29, 2023, One True King and fellow OTK member Esfand organized a charity event called Charity Lift-A-Thon, featuring OTK members and other Twitch streamers lifting weights for charity, with a goal of lifting one pound for every dollar donated during the stream. They managed to raise $140,601 towards Games for Love.

== Members ==
=== Current owners ===
- Esfand – co-founder (2020–present)
- Nmplol (2020–present)
- Sodapoppin (2022–present)
- TipsOut – co-founder (2020–present)
- Emiru (2023–present)

=== Current content creators ===
- Esfand (2020–present)
- Nmplol (2020–present)
- Cyr (2021–present)
- Sodapoppin (2022–present)

=== Former owners ===
- Rich Campbell – co-founder (2020–2022)
- jschlatt (2021–2022)
- Mizkif – co-founder (2020–2025)

=== Former content creators ===
- Asmongold (2020–2025)
- BruceDropEmOff (2022–2023)
- jschlatt (2021–2022)
- Mizkif (2020–2024)
- Rich Campbell (2020–2022)
- Tectone (2021–2024)
- Will Neff (2024–2025)
- Emiru (2022–2025)
- ExtraEmily (2023–2026)

== Awards and nominations ==
Year	Ceremony	Category	Result	Ref.
2022	Esports Awards	Content Group of the Year	Nominated	
2023	Esports Awards	Esports Content Creator of the Year	Nominated	
2021	The Streamer Awards	Best Content Organization	Won	
2022	The Streamer Awards	Best Content Organization	Nominated	
2023	The Streamer Awards	Best Content Organization	Nominated	
2024	The Streamer Awards	Best Content Organization	Nominated	
