= Aceu =

American Twitch streamer and gamer (born 1995)

aceu
- Born: Brandon Winn; April 7, 1995 (age 31); Indiana

Twitch information
- Channel: aceu
- Years active: 2016–present
- Genres: Gaming; Just Chatting
- Games: Apex Legends; Counter-Strike: Global Offensive; Valorant
- Followers: 2.9 million

YouTube information
- Channel: aceu
- Years active: 2019–present
- Genre: Gaming
- Subscribers: 1.85 million
- Views: 411.08 million

Esports career information
- Games: Counter-Strike: Global Offensive; Apex Legends
- Playing career: 2019–2020

Team history
- Counter-Strike: Global Offensive
- 2016–2017: Eclipse
- 2017–2018: Rise Nation
- 2018: eUnited
- 2018: Swole Patrol
- Apex Legends
- 2019–2020: NRG Esports
- Last updated: September 10, 2025

Brandon Winn (born April 7, 1995), better known as aceu (AY-soo), is an American streamer and retired professional Apex Legends and Counter-Strike: Global Offensive player. He signed with Sentinels as a streamer in 2022. He is known for his fluid movement and accuracy and his flashy, clip-centered playstyle.

== Early life ==
Brandon Winn was born on April 7, 1995, in Indiana. He played console games such as Halo and Call of Duty when he was young, later switching to League of Legends on his computer during high school, hoping to become a professional player. His signature clean movement style was inspired by that of basketball player Kyrie Irving.

== Career ==
After a long losing streak playing League in 2014, Winn switched to Counter-Strike: Global Offensive, going by the tag -Ace-. He was familiar with the series as he had commonly watched his stepfather play Counter-Strike 1.6 when he was growing up. After only playing the game for 200 hours, Winn received an invitation to join a semi-professional team. In 2018, however, he was benched by his team, leading to a cut in his salary. Winn began streaming to make up for the loss, participating in smaller CS:GO tournaments and playing other games.

Upon the release of Apex Legends in 2019, Winn began to stream the game and became one of the most well-known figures in the community through the spreading of his highlight reels. He also placed high in early LAN events for the game, including Twitch Rivals 2019, with NRG Esports. However, the competitive scene for Apex was not very enduring, leading him to retire in 2020 to focus on streaming. In 2022, he left NRG and signed with Sentinels.

== Awards and nominations ==
Year	Award	Category	Result	Ref.
2021	The Streamer Awards	Best Battle Royale Streamer	Won	
2021	The Streamer Awards	Gamer of the Year	Nominated	
2022	The Streamer Awards	Best FPS Streamer	Won	
2022	The Streamer Awards	Gamer of the Year	Nominated	
