= Esfand (streamer) =

American Twitch streamer and YouTuber (born 1991)

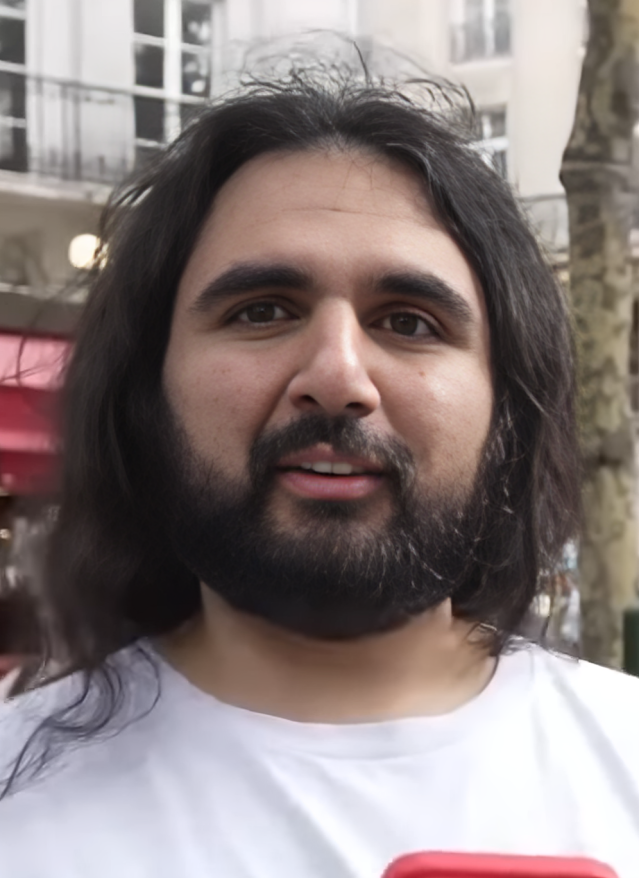
- Esfandiari in 2023
- Born: Tim Esfandiari; September 3, 1991 (age 35); Texas, U.S.
- Occupations: Twitch streamer; YouTuber

Twitch information
- Channel: EsfandTV
- Years active: 2012–present
- Genres: Gaming; Reaction; IRL
- Games: World of Warcraft Classic; Grand Theft Auto V; Madden NFL
- Followers: 1.4 million

YouTube information
- Channel: Esfand
- Years active: 2016–present
- Subscribers: 310 thousand
- Views: 104.26 million
- Last updated: September 23, 2025

Tim Esfandiari (born September 3, 1991), known online as Esfand or EsfandTV, is an American Twitch streamer and YouTuber. He is a founding member and co-owner of the gaming organization One True King. He was named Best Roleplay Streamer at the 2024 Streamer Awards.

== Early life ==
Tim Esfandiari was born to a Persian American family in Texas, United States on September 3, 1991, and grew up in Dallas, Texas.

He attended Southern Methodist University in Dallas, Texas, where he majored in computer science. He played for the football team until he got injured, which led to him working as a staff member for the team, specifically in the recruiting and video department. He revealed that he had wanted to be a football coach originally before his streaming career took off. He had worked with Chad Morris, Justin Lawler, James Quinn, and Trey Quinn during his time at the university.

== Career ==
=== 2012–2020: Early career ===
Esfandiari created his Twitch account in 2012 and his YouTube account EsfandTV in 2016, predominantly streaming World of Warcraft and Madden NFL content during his early streaming career. He began streaming on YouTube and explained that he started streaming because he wanted to record his raid on World of Warcraft, but because he didn't have enough hard drive space, he had to store them on YouTube, which eventually gained traction and became the most watched World of Warcraft private server streamer. On November 15, 2017, his YouTube channel got a DMCA strike by Blizzard for streaming the private World of Warcraft server. He then switched platforms to Twitch and started streaming there.

On February 2, 2019, it was announced that Esfandiari had joined esports organization Method Gaming as part of their roster of content creators.

On April 30, 2019, Esfandiari and fellow Twitch streamer and friend Mizkif, were banned from Twitch in response to an incident that occurred at PAX East between them and Jenna "Meowri", a streamer and cosplayer, where Esfandiari and Mizkif made an insensitive joke towards Meowri during a livestream. They were then unbanned seven days later.

=== 2020–Present: One True King and football content ===
On June 25, 2020, Esfandiari announced that he had left Method Gaming following the organization's mishandling of a series of sexual harassment and abuse allegations.

On October 11, 2020, Esfandiari and fellow Twitch streamers Asmongold, Mizkif, Rich Campbell, and Tips Out announced the launch of their new gaming, streaming, and content creation organization, One True King. He is also a co-owner of Starforge Systems, which makes PCs.

In October 2021, he collaborated with Twitch and started Let's Go! Football, a weekly show in which he discusses football with current and former players such as JuJu Smith-Schuster and Ryan Shazier, along with some of his fellow Twitch streamers. Later that month, he appeared on the infamous Twitch Leaks, which revealed the top Twitch streamers earnings from August 2019 to October 2021. He was ranked 66 on the list, with a reported payout of $1,170,700.02 during this time period.

In early 2022, he reached one million followers on Twitch. In March 2022, he was nominated for Best MMORPG Streamer at the 2021 Streamer Awards. On May 14, 2022, Esfandiari was one of the pre-fight interviewer for the 2022 Creator Clash charity boxing event.

In March 2023, Esfandiari was nominated for Best MMORPG Streamer at the 2022 Streamer Awards. On April 15, 2023, he participated in the 2023 Creator Clash as the pre-fight interviewer. Later on April 27, 2023, he hosted an event called Draft Day Extravaganza, a football event to coincide with the first day of the NFL Draft. The five-hour broadcast featured a rotating cast of both Twitch creators like Esfandiari and current and former NFL players including Austin Ekeler, Micah Parsons and Kenny Vaccaro.

In February 2024, Esfandiari was nominated for Best MMORPG Streamer at the 2023 Streamer Awards. Later that year at the 2024 Streamer Awards, he won Best Roleplay Streamer and was nominated for Best Sports Streamer.

== Philanthropy ==
On April 29, 2023, Esfandiari and One True King organized a charity event called Charity Lift-A-Thon, featuring OTK members and other Twitch streamers lifting weights for charity, with a goal of lifting one pound for every dollar donated during the stream. They managed to raise more than $140,601 towards Games for Love.

== Personal life ==
He is a supporter of the Dallas Cowboys.

During a livestream on May 3, 2022, in South Korea, Esfandiari had chipped a bone in his thumb while playing against an arcade machine, for which he was hospitalized later. The South Korean government subsequently issued an apology to which Esfandiari did not reply.

== Awards and nominations ==
Ceremony	Year	Category	Result	Ref.
The Streamer Awards	2021	Best MMORPG Streamer	Nominated	
The Streamer Awards	2022	Best MMORPG Streamer	Nominated	
The Streamer Awards	2023	Best MMORPG Streamer	Nominated	
The Streamer Awards	2024	Best Roleplay Streamer	Won	
The Streamer Awards	2024	Best Sports Streamer	Nominated	

== Filmography ==
=== Music videos ===
List of music video appearances by Esfand
Year	Title	Artist(s)	Role	Ref.
2025	"mary poppins"	Bbno$	Himself	
