= 2024 Streamer Awards =

Live streaming awards ceremony

- Awarded for: Excellence in live streaming
- Sponsored by: Mountain Dew, Fortnite, PC Game Pass
- Date: December 7, 2024
- Location: Mayan Theater, Los Angeles, California
- Country: United States
- Hosted by: QTCinderella & TinaKitten
- Preshow hosts: Valkyrae, CDawgVA, StableRonaldo, Sketch, & JHBTeam
- Acts: Bella Poarch, ironmouse, & Johnnie Guilbert
- Most awards: IShowSpeed, Kai Cenat (3)
- Most nominations: Kai Cenat (5)

Streaming coverage
- Network: Twitch & YouTube
- Runtime: 337 minutes
- Viewership: 525,708 peak viewers
- Directed by: QTCinderella

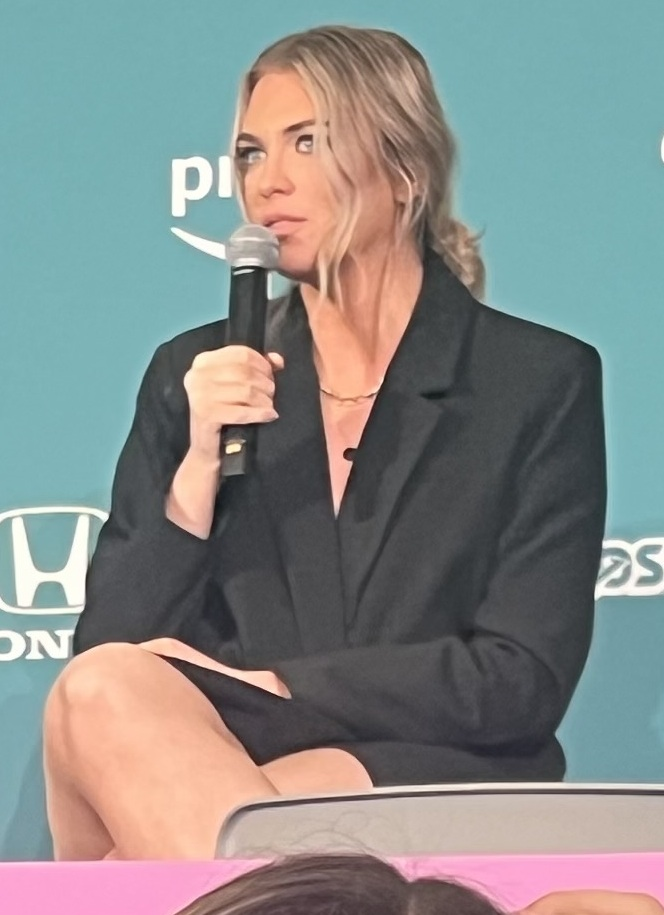
QTCinderella hosted the show.

The 2024 Streamer Awards was the fourth edition of The Streamer Awards honoring the best in live streaming in 2024. The ceremony was held at the Mayan Theater in Los Angeles, California, on December 7, 2024. It was hosted by showrunner QTCinderella and fellow streamer TinaKitten.

This was the first time the awards were held in fourth quarter of the year instead of the first. Voting for new categories opened on October 17, with nominations opening on October 28 and nominees being announced on November 11.

The ceremony was co-hosted by TinaKitten, while the red carpet was hosted by Valkyrae, CDawgVA, StableRonaldo, and JHBTeam; TheSketchReal served as floor host, as well as being on the red carpet.

This edition was partnered with Mountain Dew, Fortnite and PC Game Pass, and was sponsored by YouTube, Honkai: Star Rail, Teamfight Tactics, Rouge Point, and Kingdom Come: Deliverance II.

For this edition, five new categories were added (Best MOBA Streamer, Best Sports Streamer, Best Fortnite Streamer, Best Streamed Collab, and Best Marathon Stream).

This edition of the awards peaked at 525,708 live concurrent viewers across all platforms and channels, marking the first time a decline in viewership had been seen. Live viewership declined 18.59% compared to the previous ceremony.

== Performers ==
The 2024 Streamer Awards featured musical performances from:

Performers at the 2024 Streamer Awards
Artist(s)	Song(s)
Johnnie Guilbert	"Zombie" "Vampire"
ironmouse	"Time To Feast" "Cry For Me (WA WA WA)"
Bella Poarch	"Sweet Delusion" "Will You Always Love Her?"

== Winners and nominees ==
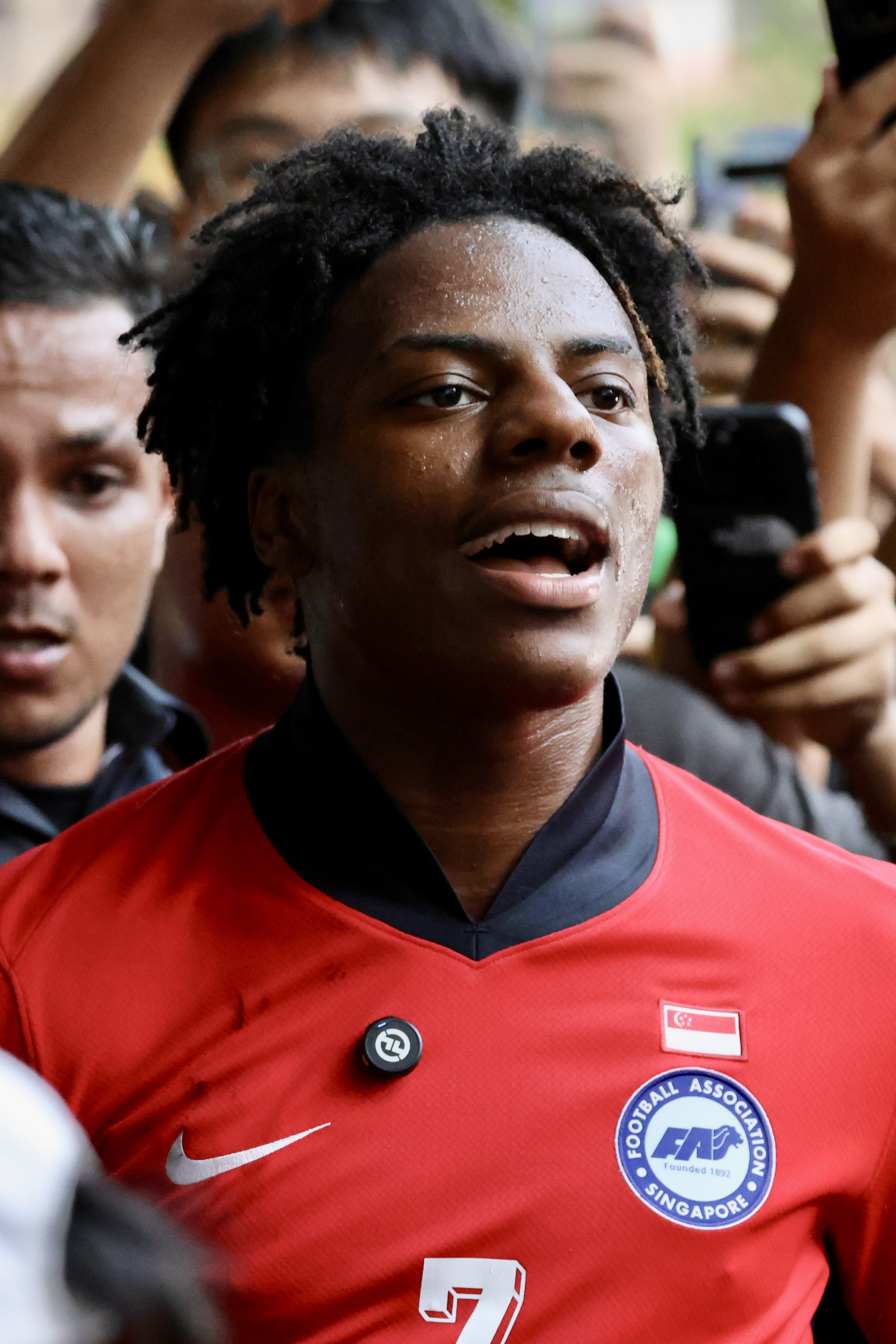
IShowSpeed, winner of the Streamer of the Year award

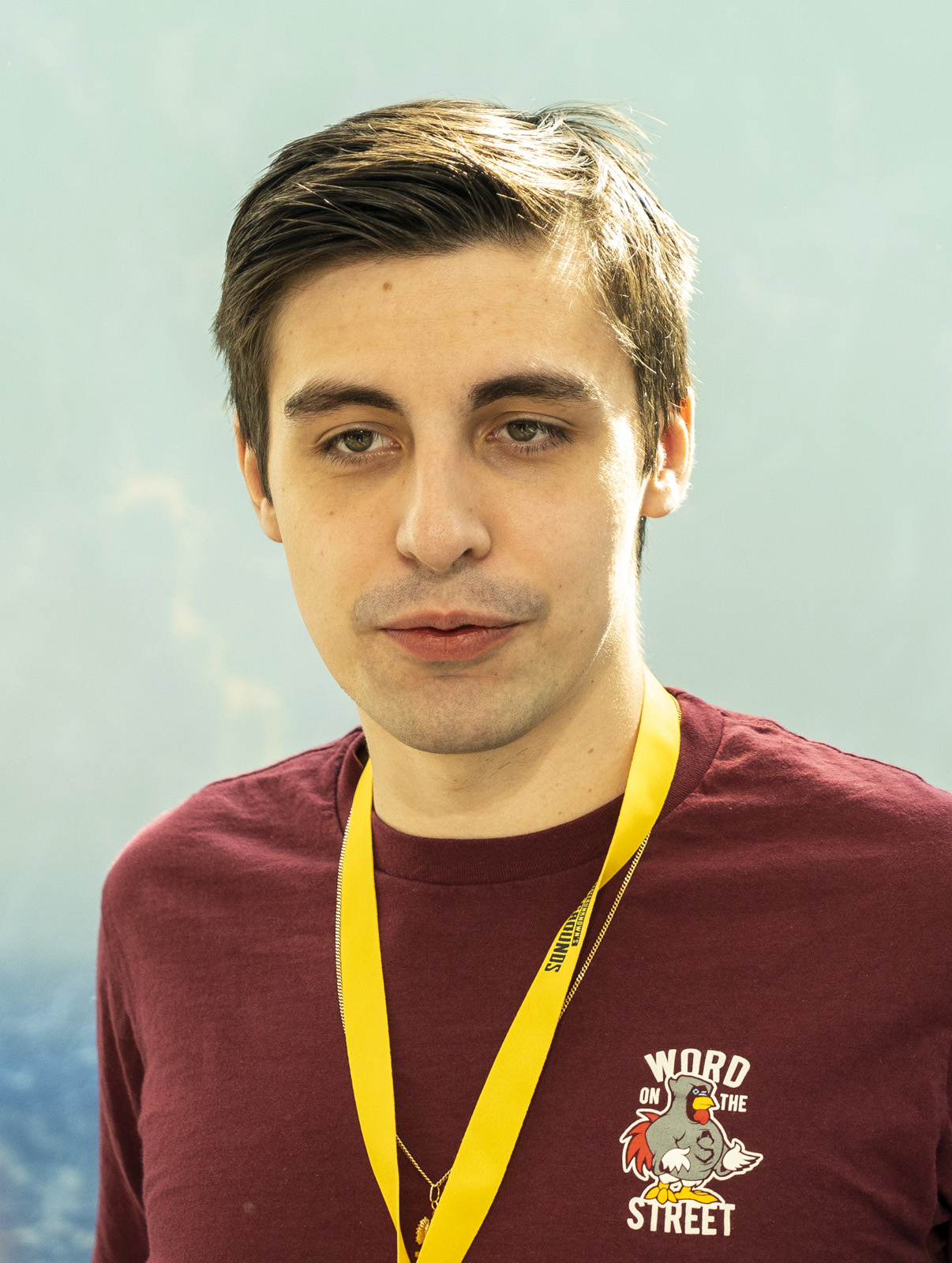
Shroud, winner of the Legacy award

Streamers were nominated and voted for by their fans, besides the Legacy Award and the Streamer's Streamer Award, which were voted on by the Streamer Awards panel and audience respectively.

Winners are listed first and in boldface.

**Best Creative Arts Streamer**: **plaqueboymax**; OniGiri; ipaintbirbs; PizzaPrincessG	**Best Role-Play Streamer**: **EsfandTV**; Chatterbox; juansguarnizo; Fanum
**Best MOBA Streamer**: **Caedrel**; loltyler1; Arteezy; singsing	**Hidden Gem Award**: **cartoontherapy**; ChompTV; NicoleBelafonte; saucekill
**Best Battle Royale Streamer**: **NiceWigg**; Swagg; iiTzTimmy; HisWattson	**Best Fighting Games Streamer**: **Sajam**; LilyPichu; Etoiles; punkdagod
**Best Speedrun Streamer**: **Squeex**; LilAggy; greensuigi; Wirtual	**Best Sports Streamer**: **thesketchreal**; EsfandTV; Flight23white; angryginge13
**Best Fortnite Streamer**: **Clix**; Peterbot; HappyHappyGal; MrSavage	**Best FPS Streamer**: **Jynxzi**; TenZ; Foolish; Shroud
**Best Strategy Game Streamer**: **AnnaCramling**; Northernlion; boxbox; Grubby	Get Off Your A** Award (Best IRL Streamer): **IShowSpeed**; ExtraEmily; stableronaldo; Lacy
**Stream Game of the Year**: **Chained Together**; Elden Ring; Black Myth: Wukong; Tekken 8	**Best Content Organization**: **FaZe Clan**; One True King; AMP; VShojo
**Best International Streamer**: **IShowSpeed**; Papaplatte; ibai; fps_shaka; aminematue	**Best Streamed Collab**: **Sleepover Stream - Kai Cenat, Kevin Hart & Druski**; Fortnite Friday - ConnorEatsPants & George Santos; Agent00 & Cinna; Adin Ross & Donald Trump
**Best Streamed Event**: **Streamer Games - Ludwig**; Cyclethon 3 - CDawgVA; Road Trip to TwitchCon - nmplol, fanfan, ExtraEmily & MISTERARTHER; Creator League Basketball @ DreamCon - RDCgaming	**Best Marathon Stream**: **Mafiathon 2 - KaiCenat**; FaZe Clan Subathon - FaZe Clan; ironmouse Subathon 2024 - ironmouse; Spinning Box Stream - DeadBlossomJesse
**Best VTuber**: **ironmouse**; dokibird; Zentreya; vedal987	**Best Variety Streamer**: **RDCgaming**; CaseOh; Elajjaz; Agent00; Joe Bartolozzi
**Best Just Chatting Streamer**: **KaiCenat**; HasanAbi; nmplol; jasontheween; Emiru	**Rising Star Award**: **MISTERARTHER**; Arky; parkenharbor; youngdabo
**Best Breakout Streamer**: **jasontheween**; Cinna; thesketchreal; JakeWebber69; rayasianboy	**League of Their Own**: **PirateSoftware**; detune; RDCgaming; PerriKaryal
**Streamers' Choice Award**: **nmplol**	**Legacy Award**: **Shroud**
**The Sapphire Award**: **Cinna**; ironmouse; MissMikkaa; ExtraEmily; Valkyrae	**Gamer of the Year**: **CaseOh**; Clix; Jynxzi; TenZ; KaiCenat
**Streamer of the Year**: **IShowSpeed**; PirateSoftware; Caedrel; Emiru; KaiCenat	
