= Jschlatt =

American internet personality (born 1999)

Schlatt
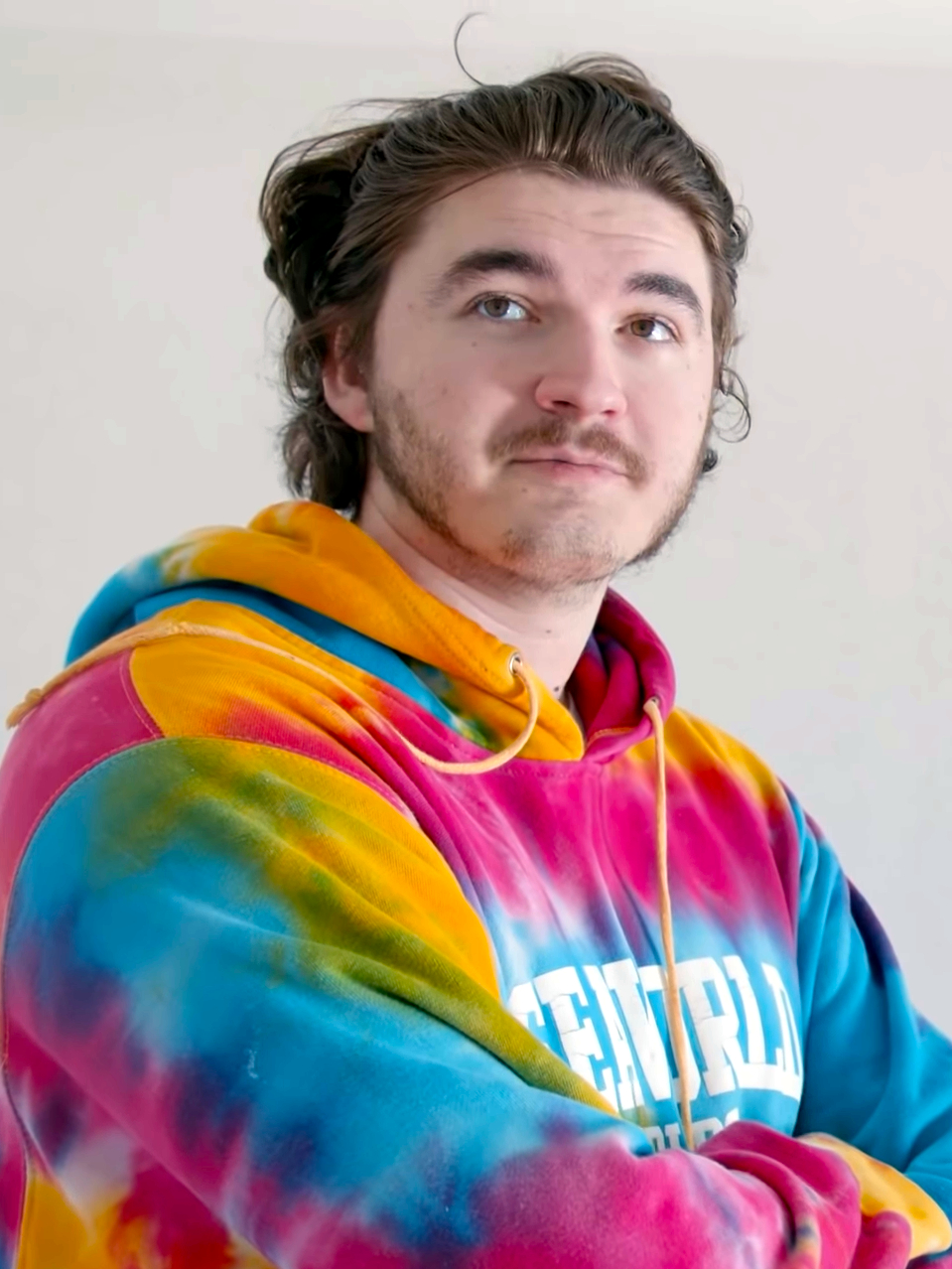
- Schlatt in 2021
- Born: September 10, 1999 (age 27); New York City, U.S.
- Other name: Schlatt
- Occupations: YouTuber; Twitch streamer; podcast host; singer; internet personality
- Organizations: Schlatt & Co. (2020–present); One True King (2021–2022); Gamer Supps (2022–present); Starforge Systems (2022–present)

Twitch information
- Channel: schlatt
- Years active: 2014–present
- Followers: 2.2 million (main channel); 2.8 million (combined) (Note: Followers, broken down by channel: 2.2 million (schlatt) 603 thousand (BigGuy))

YouTube information
- Channel: Schlatt & Co.
- Years active: 2013–present
- Genres: Gaming; Reaction; IRL
- Subscribers: 4.59 million (largest channel); 15.61 million (combined) (Note: Subscribers, broken down by channel: 4.59 million (jschlattLIVE) 3.88 million (Big guy) 1.41 million (jschlatt) 1.33 million (Schlatt & Co.) 1.09 million (Chuckle Sandwich) 994 thousand (theweeklyslap) 744 thousand (Sleep Deprived) 796 thousand (jschlattVODS) 431 thousand (DID SCHLATT WIN?) 348 thousand (Lud and Schlatts Musical Emporium))
- Views: 681.9 million (largest channel); 7.4 billion (combined) (Note: Views, broken down by channel: 681.9 million (jschlattLIVE) 5.89 billion (Big guy) 63.17 million (jschlatt) 166.2 million (Schlatt & Co.) 172.3 million (Chuckle Sandwich) 24.88 million (theweeklyslap) 222.94 million (Sleep Deprived) 119.49 million (jschlattVODS) 58.48 million (DID SCHLATT WIN?) 6.73 million (Lud and Schlatts Musical Emporium))
- Musical career
- Genres: Christmas music; jazz
- Instrument: Vocals
- Years active: 2024–present
- Label: Broke
- Last updated: October 17, 2025
- Website: schlatt.co

jschlatt (/ˈdʒeɪ ʃlæt/ JAY shlat; born September 10, 1999), also known as Schlatt, is an American YouTuber, entrepreneur, singer, and voice actor. He produces a variety of gaming, commentary, and reaction content. He is a former member of Minecraft server communities such as SMPLive and Dream SMP. He was a co-owner of streamer collective group One True King until his departure in December 2022. He is an acquired owner of the energy drink company Gamer Supps from May 2022, and is a co-owner of pre-built gaming computer company Starforge Systems.

Schlatt released his debut studio album, A Very 1999 Christmas in December 2024, followed by a variant of the album with 3 additional previously unreleased tracks in December 2025. Schlatt made his voice acting debut in 2026, voicing Kaboodle from the Glitch Productions show, Gameoverse.

== Internet career ==
=== 2013–2018: Before fame ===
Schlatt began making YouTube videos in 2013 at 14 years old, uploading gameplay videos on Call of Duty. He had major influences such as Freddie Wong, Corridor Digital and SeaNanners. Schlatt started posting under the alias "jschlatt" in June 2014 with a video of his pet pogona. The channel's content evolved from gaming to include comedic sketches, reaction videos, internet commentary, and satirical takes on memes and trending topics.

In July 2017, Schlatt started the podcast "Sleep Deprived" with his friend Mikasacus, with apandah and Aztrosist joining later on. The episodes were posted on the channel until episode 6 where it was transferred to its own independent channel.

In January 2018, the jschlatt channel got taken down for violating YouTube's guidelines. Schlatt stated that he never knew what rule he had broken. Schlatt was able to reinstate the channel by publicly contacting the YouTube support team on Twitter. On February 6, 2018, Schlatt uploaded "elon r u ok?" which became one of his most viewed videos at the time.

Schlatt began streaming on Twitch in June 2018, playing a wide variety of games, including Cities: Skylines, Minecraft, and indie simulation titles. In September 2018, Schlatt started "theweeklyslap", a therapeautic channel where he answers serious questions under Call of Duty gameplay.

=== 2019–2020: SMPLive and Lunch Club ===
On March 1, 2019, Schlatt joined the private Minecraft server SMPLive started by Cscoop and CallMeCarson. Viewers were interested in Schlatt's dry humor and usage of terrible audio quality. Schlatt frequently played on the server, posting videos about it. During this time, Schlatt transitioned posting videos over to "jschlattLIVE". In September 2019, as a finale of his SMPLive series, Schlatt revealed his face after beating the game's final boss. In December 2019, Schlatt went on an unannounced hiatus from streaming.

In January 2020, Schlatt alongside other members of SMPLive, started a content group channel named Lunch Club. The channel primarily focused on vlog content. In January 2021, the Lunch Club channel ended after multiple allegations were targeted towards one of the founding members.

=== 2020–2021: Dream SMP, One True King ===
In 2020, Schlatt briefly joined the Dream SMP, a Minecraft roleplay server, participating in collaborative events and storylines. Although his time on the server was limited, it helped consolidate his reputation in the online gaming community.

In 2021, Schlatt joined the content organization One True King as a co-owner, participating in videos, livestreams, and online events. In January 2021, Schlatt was a host for Chuckle Sandwich with Ted Nivison and Slimecicle. In December 2021, Schlatt announced his return to streaming on Twitch.

=== 2022–2024: Reaction content ===
In 2022, Schlatt left One True King, though would continue to maintain an advisory role for their YouTube team and would remain present in Starforge Systems, a business venture for OTK. In April 2022, Schlatt started his reaction content series, where he reacts to user-created or user-requested videos live on stream based on a certain topic. Topics ranged from bedrooms, computer setups, to general vertical content. In August 2022, Schlatt took a hiatus from the Sleep Deprived podcast, only appearing in the channel's gaming videos. In September 2022, Schlatt alongside Ludwig started "Ludwig and Schlatt's Musical Emporium", a channel that released copyright-free recordings of classical music. Alongside it, two tracks inspired by the Animal Crossing soundtrack were released. In June 2023, a full soundtrack album was released containing 12 tracks free of copyright.

In 2023, Schlatt created a debate podcast "Did Schlatt Win?" where he and a guest debate over random things. In March 2024, Schlatt announced his return to the Sleep Deprived podcasts under Patreon-exclusive, and their Minecraft server, the SDMP (Sleep Deprived Minecraft Server).

=== 2024–present: Music ventures and semi-retirement ===
In December 2024, Schlatt announced a Christmas album featuring 8 classical Christmas song covers titled "A Very 1999 Christmas". The album was created after an abundance of people requested it when Schlatt covered the song My Way in 2023. In December 2025, the album was re-released with 3 unreleased bonus tracks. Schlatt maintains a multi-platform presence with a large audience across streaming, video, and podcast formats.

In December 2025, Schlatt announced he is taking an indefinite hiatus from his largest YouTube channel, JschlattLIVE to focus on his mental health, transitioning over to his popular secondary channel, Schlatt & Co. where he continues to post regular videos there. Schlatt, alongside members of Sleep Deprived announced that they will be ending their Patreon-hosted podcast and decrease the video rates to 1 video per week. Schlatt stated that he will be doing other ventures such as pursuing music and voice acting.

In January 2026, Glitch Productions announced their show Gameoverse, which features Schlatt voicing the character Kaboodle.

== Business ventures ==
=== Gamer Supps ===
In May 2022, Schlatt acquired Gamer Supps, a gaming-focused energy supplement company. The company produces energy supplements marketed towards gamers, with products including their signature "GG" energy formula. Following his acquisition, Schlatt has been involved in the company's marketing and product development, though the company has faced some controversy regarding its business practices with content creators.

=== Starforge Systems ===
While part of One True King (OTK), Schlatt was involved with Starforge Systems, a gaming PC company created in partnership with MoistCr1tikal. After his departure from OTK in December 2022, he continued to maintain an advisory role with the company.

=== Business operations ===
Schlatt operates through his company Schlatt & Co., which he co-owns with a business partner. The company handles various projects including merchandise sales and content production.

== Podcasts ==
=== Sleep Deprived ===
In addition to solo streaming and Minecraft appearances, Schlatt is a founding member and regular host of the comedy podcast Sleep Deprived. The programme began with episodic uploads to his personal channel in July 2017 before moving to its own dedicated channel. The show features apandah, Mikasacus, and Aztrosist, with Sancho listed humorously as a "member" despite not being a real participant, along with guest appearances from other creators. Schlatt temporarily left the podcast for Episodes 101–149, returning to host the series from Episode 150 onward, at which point the podcast began releasing content exclusively on Patreon while still offering select episodes on YouTube. The show is available as video on YouTube and as an audio podcast on platforms including Spotify and Apple Podcasts; episodes have been released on a largely weekly schedule since the channel relaunch. As of October 2025, the podcast has over 230 episodes on Patreon and more than 744,000 subscribers on YouTube.

=== The Weekly Slap ===
The Weekly Slap is a laid-back podcast and commentary series hosted by Schlatt, launched in September 2018 on its own YouTube channel. The show features Schlatt discussing personal thoughts, answering audience questions, and exploring topics that interest him, often while playing older Call of Duty titles. Its tone contrasts with his louder or more comedic content, focusing instead on candid monologues and relaxed commentary. While initially uploaded on a weekly basis, new episodes are released irregularly as part of his broader YouTube content.

=== Lunch Club ===
Before his independent success, Schlatt was part of Lunch Club, a collaborative YouTube group and podcast originally known as Goopcast. The group included creators such as CallMeCarson, Ted Nivison, traves, cscoop and others, producing discussion-based comedy videos and podcasts focused on internet culture and gaming. The show premiered in mid-2019 and was briefly one of the more popular creator collectives in the Minecraft and commentary scene, before becoming inactive in early 2021 following internal controversies unrelated to Schlatt's conduct. Although the channel remains archived, several episodes continue to circulate on fan channels and archival sites.

=== Chuckle Sandwich ===
Schlatt co-created the comedy podcast Chuckle Sandwich alongside Ted Nivison, Tucker Keane, and Slimecicle (Charlie Dalgleish) in early 2021. The show follows a structured yet improvisational format, focusing on comedy discussions, skits, and commentary about internet culture and personal anecdotes. Episodes were released to YouTube and Spotify, frequently featuring guest creators such as Jaiden Animations, TommyInnit and Markiplier. Nivison and Schlatt announced the end of the podcast in November 2024, with the final episode releasing in January 2025.

=== Did Schlatt Win? ===
In January 2023, Schlatt launched the short-form channel Did Schlatt Win? as a humorous series tracking his personal gaming challenges and competitive streaks in various titles. Each video follows a brief, punchline-driven format answering the titular question, with topics ranging from simulation games to online competitions. The series quickly gained popularity for its self-aware editing and comedic timing, becoming one of his most viral side projects.

== Music career ==
"Schlatt's Basement"
The tenth track on the album Lud and Schlatt Crossing by Lud and Schlatts Musical Emporium. Music by Phillip Milman in 2023; funded by Ludwig Ahgren and Jschlatt.

On September 28, 2022, Schlatt and Ludwig Ahgren created the YouTube channel Lud and Schlatts Musical Emporium, a collaborative project aimed at providing royalty-free recordings of famous classical compositions, as well as original, Nintendo-inspired music for use in content creation.

On December 15, 2023, Schlatt released a cover of Frank Sinatra's "My Way" in response to several artificial intelligence-created song covers that used his voice as well as other parts of his likeness. The cover was later removed by Universal Music Group for alleged copyright infringement. On November 7, 2024, Schlatt released a cover of the Christmas song "Santa Claus Is Comin' to Town" and announced the beginning of work on his debut Christmas album, A Very 1999 Christmas. The album was created with the help of saxophonist Tom Scott, a former member of the Blues Brothers, to arrange the music sheets. The full album was recorded at The Sound Factory in Hollywood, Los Angeles, California. Following the worldwide blocking of the cover on YouTube, Schlatt released his second single, "Let It Snow! Let It Snow! Let It Snow!", on November 21, 2024. The album, which includes Schlatt's first two singles as well as six other classic Christmas songs, officially released on December 1, 2024.

On November 28, 2025, Schlatt released a deluxe version of the album which included all eight songs, along with three new songs; a cover of "Sleigh Ride", "Mele Kalikimaka", and "Everybody's Waiting for the Man".

On December 2, 2025, Schlatt noted in his video announcing the end of uploads to JschlattLIVE that he has plans to release a jazz standards album within the next two years and is looking for venues to perform.

=== Musical style and reception ===
Schlatt's musical style draws inspiration from traditional crooners, particularly evident in his covers of classic Christmas songs and his interpretation of Frank Sinatra's "My Way". His debut album A Very 1999 Christmas received positive reception from fans, with particular praise for his vocal abilities in the traditional crooner style.

== Personal life ==
In early 2021, Schlatt adopted an orange tabby cat named Jambo.

== Filmography ==
Year	Title	Role	Notes	Ref.
2018; 2021	Scott the Woz	Himself	2 episodes	
2026–present	Gameoverse	Kaboodle	Voice actor	

== Discography ==
=== Studio albums ===
Title	Album details
A Very 1999 Christmas	Released: December 1, 2024; Label: Self-released; Formats: LP, streaming
A Very 1999 Christmas Deluxe	Released: November 28, 2025; Label: Broke; Features 3 unreleased songs; Formats: LP, streaming

=== Singles ===
Title	Year	Album
"Santa Claus Is Comin' to Town"	2024	A Very 1999 Christmas
"Let It Snow! Let It Snow! Let It Snow!"	2024	A Very 1999 Christmas

=== Music videos ===
Year	Title	Artist	Role	Ref.
2025	"Hot Topic" (Note: Styled in lowercase letters.)	bbno$	Music video feature	

=== Podcasts ===
Title	Year	Role
Sleep Deprived	2017–2023 (Note: Schlatt temporarily left the podcast after episode #100, only appearing in the channel's gaming videos. Schlatt would return a year later after the podcast's exclusive transition to Patreon.) 2024–2025 (Note: The podcast ended with the last episode released on Patreon in December 31, 2025. The YouTube channel is still active. However, the members plan on ending it once Schlatt wants it to end. The rest of the members started their transition over to another channel called "banana channel".)	Himself (host)
The Weekly Slap	2018–present	Himself (host)
Lunch Club Podcast	2019–2020	Himself (co-host)
Chuckle Sandwich	2021–2025	Himself (host)
Did Schlatt Win?	2023	Himself (host)
