= Asmongold =

American streamer and political commentator

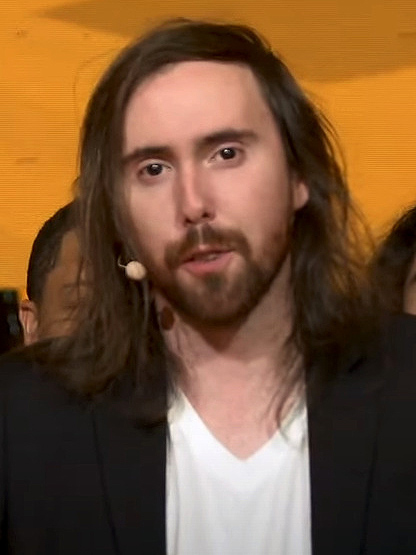
- Hoyt in 2022
- Born: 1990 (age 35–36); Florida, U.S.
- Other name: ZackRawrr
- Occupations: Twitch streamer; YouTuber; political commentator

Twitch information
- Channel: zackrawrr
- Years active: 2014–present
- Genres: Reaction; Gaming
- Games: World of Warcraft; Lost Ark; Final Fantasy XIV; Dark Souls; Elden Ring; New World
- Followers: 2.5 million

YouTube information
- Channel: Asmongold TV
- Years active: 2008–present
- Subscribers: 4.76 million
- Views: 6.2 billion
- Last updated: November 19, 2026

Zack Hoyt (born 1990), known online as Asmongold, is an American YouTuber, online streamer, and right-leaning political commentator. Initially a World of Warcraft streamer, he built a substantial online following through his gameplay, commentary, and discussions of gaming culture. His content subsequently expanded to include other video games, current events, and politics.

In 2020, Hoyt co-founded the gaming and content creation organization One True King (OTK); he stepped away from his leadership roles in 2025. He was also involved in establishing Starforge Systems, a company specializing in gaming computers, in 2022. Hoyt's views have been labeled as conservative and anti-"woke". He has been suspended several times from Twitch for racist remarks about Palestinians and migrants.

== Early life ==
Zack Hoyt was born in 1990 in Florida. Not long after he was born he moved to Austin, Texas. He grew up with an interest in video games, particularly role-playing games (RPGs), and was introduced to World of Warcraft by a friend in 2006. He quickly became captivated by the game and began playing it extensively. Hoyt later attended college, but dropped out to focus on his streaming career.

== Career ==
With the release of World of Warcraft Classic in 2019, Hoyt's popularity surged; he became one of the platform's most prominent streamers in that year. On the game's release day, August 26, 2019, he opened his stream before tens of thousands of live viewers. He remained one of Twitch's most popular World of Warcraft streamers during the Shadowlands launch in 2020.

On July 3, 2021, he played Final Fantasy XIV for the first time before hundreds of thousands of viewers. Hoyt's favor towards World of Warcraft soured in July 2021, when a lawsuit was filed against the game's developer Activision Blizzard for discrimination against and sexual harassment of female employees. Hoyt subsequently began regularly criticizing Activision Blizzard and providing regular updates on the lawsuit on his streams. By August 2021, Hoyt had become one of the largest streamers on Twitch, with over 2 million followers. In October of the same year, leaked data from Twitch showed that Hoyt had earned the 14th-highest amount of money on the platform since August 2019, totalling at over $2.5 million. His house and streaming room have long been a meme among viewers, with Asmongold saying that he lived "like an American" rather than like streamers who pay for cleaners and deliveries.

During the 2022 Depp v. Heard defamation trial, Hoyt spent much of his streaming time reacting live to the proceedings. On June 1, the day of the verdict, his stream reached nearly 450,000 concurrent viewers, a personal record. In 2022, Hoyt contacted Republican senator Ted Cruz to discuss regulating loot boxes in video games. Cruz was non-committal.

In early 2024, Hoyt, alongside other prominent YouTubers, aided in spreading "anti-woke" conspiracism about Sweet Baby Inc.'s work in promoting diversity, equity, and inclusion. Writing for Aftermath, Nathan Grayson named Hoyt among the large content creators whose videos platformed the conspiracy theory's ideas and its leaders.

In a Twitch stream on October 14, 2024, Hoyt called Palestinians "terrible people" from "an inferior culture" that "kills people for their identity" and "is directly antithetical to everything Western values stand for". He also said that they "have genocide built into Sharia law right now, so, no, I'm not going to cry a fucking river when people who have genocide that's baked into their laws are getting genocided, a statement that was later called a "racist tirade". His zackrawrr account on Twitch was banned for 14 days due to violating the platform's hateful conduct policy. Hoyt initially made a brief apology on Twitter which was criticized by PC Gamer, stating "that quite a few people don't consider 'my bad' a sufficient expression of contrition and reconsideration for espousing grossly racist attitudes". Hoyt later released a more extensive apology stating he had been "slowly devolving into the most mean-spirited, rude, nasty, callous, psychopathic version of [him]self" and he would take a break from streaming. He also stepped down from his leadership positions in OTK and Starforge Systems.

After Elon Musk was accused in January 2025 of paying third parties to boost his Path of Exile 2 account, Hoyt challenged Musk to prove that he himself had leveled a character to 97 in hardcore mode, after which Musk unfollowed Hoyt on X, removed his verification check, and posted a screenshot of their private messages. A community note under the post stated that leaking private messages without permission generally violated X's guidelines. Musk later deleted his tweets, and the two have subsequently interacted with each other on X about other topics.

During a stream on August 3, 2026, Hoyt reacted to a video by YouTuber Nick Shirley about migrants entering the Spanish exclave of Ceuta. He received a 14-day ban for suggesting that migrants, including children, attempting to cross from Morocco into Ceuta should be shot; he refused to apologize for these remarks.

During the beta for World of Warcraft: Forever, a client-side mod was created for the game to hide all player chat messages and auto-decline guild invitations from players in guilds associated with Hoyt. Players reported slurs, chat spam, and guild invitation spam (the latter targeted at new players) coming from Hoyt's associated players. Avoiding players was harder than in the standard World of Warcraft as instead of avoiding servers that the guild frequented through manual selection, players would be automatically sorted into the same servers according to rulesets.

=== Business ventures ===
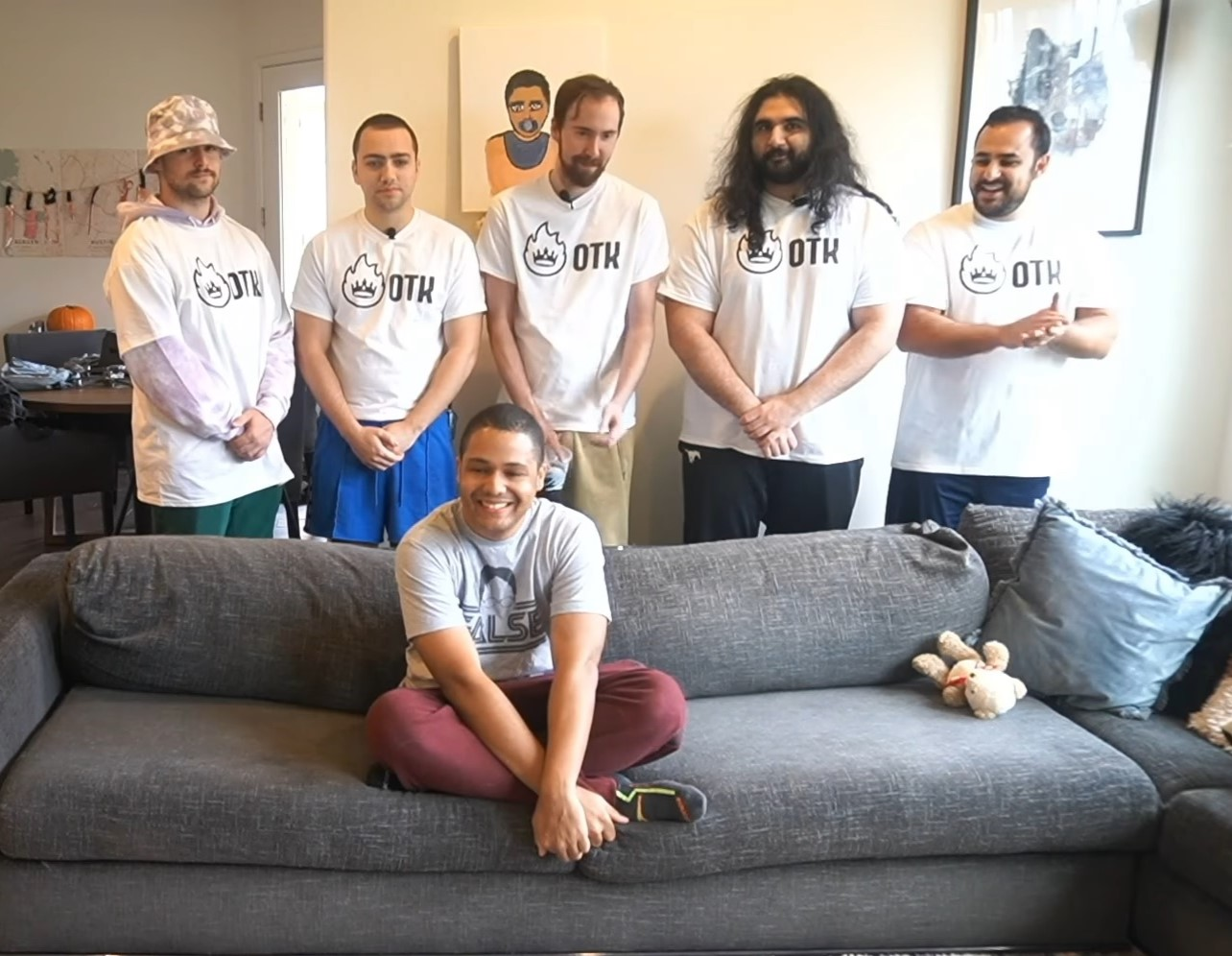
One True King members in October 2020. From left: Rich Campbell, Mizkif, Nmplol (seated), Asmongold, Esfand, and Tips Out.

In October 2020, Hoyt co-founded One True King (OTK), a streaming and content creation organization, with other content creators, including Mizkif and Esfand. In August 2022, he announced OTK's new PC building company, Starforge Systems, in collaboration with fellow content creator MoistCr1tikal. The company received backlash over the high prices of their products, to which they responded by reducing their prices by $100. In February 2023, Hoyt cofounded the talent agency Mythic Talent alongside fellow OTK member TipsOut, serving in an advisory capacity. On February 21, 2025, Hoyt announced that he had stepped away from his leadership roles within the OTK organization.

== Views ==
According to The Atlantic, Hoyt presents his opinions as so common "that disagreeing with him means you're intellectually disabled". His beliefs have been characterized as a brand of conservatism defined by a lack of committed beliefs and hostility towards "left-wing identity politics". Hoyt has expressed support for universal basic income and a constitutional right to abortion. He has characterized himself as a moral nihilist, describing morality and principles as "top-down ideas that are given to you by the elites."

Hoyt is among a class of video game critics who believe that left-leaning, "woke" perspectives were forced into video games. He attributes this influence of "woke" perspectives in games to the environmental, social, and governance investment principle, arguing that left-leaning games are more likely to attract investment from large fund managers.

Hoyt has been characterized as typically holding anti-trans views. In 2021, he refused to take part in a boycott against Twitch to protest "hate raids" against streamers of color and LGBTQ streamers claiming the movement needed large streamers to succeed, despite being one of the largest on the platform. As part of his political commentary, Hoyt claimed that "every trans kid is a victim of a parent with mental illness". Despite Hoyt's claims that trans children have been "groomed" into being trans, he has said he would respect the pronoun choices of his own children.

Media Matters for America has been critical of Hoyt's remarks against immigrants and political opposition, highlighting statements he made in which he called for criminal prosecution of both groups in addition to a statement Hoyt made that his goal in his coverage is to "radicalize people as much as possible" by portraying subjects in "the most extreme and negative way" as a means of driving people toward his desired solutions. They also reported that Hoyt has praised white nationalist Nick Fuentes and anti-Muslim activist Tommy Robinson for being "willing to put it on the table and risk their platforms", and has described his own role as a bridge between far-right figures and more mainstream audiences.

On one occasion, Hoyt cited Democratic congressman Al Green's disruption of President Donald Trump's 2025 Congressional Address, stating that Green's actions make "people think [he's] a fucking retard". In December 2025, Hoyt endorsed candidate James Fishback's campaign for Governor of Florida, describing Fishback as "based" and urging his followers to "vote for people like this". After an ICE agent fatally shot Renée Good in Minneapolis on January 7, 2026, Hoyt wrote on X that people should "comply with police". Vice President JD Vance reposted Hoyt's commentary on the case. His remarks have frequently drawn accusations of misogyny, including claims that men are "more naturally attractive" than women, that women are "best" at "selling themselves for money", and that female streamers are essentially equivalent to OnlyFans creators.

== Legal issues ==
In November 2025, Hoyt was named in a lawsuit filed by the streamer Mizkif as a defendant alongside fellow streamer Emiru, OTK Media Inc., Mythic Talent Management Inc., and King Gaming Labs Inc. for reputational harm, lost earnings, and emotional distress. The lawsuit came after Emiru accused Mizkif of "psychological and domestic abuse, stalking, harassment, sexual assault, and threats of blackmail", which was then amplified by Hoyt during his livestreams.

== Awards and nominations ==
Year	Ceremony	Category	Result	Ref.
2020	Esports Awards 2020	Streamer of the Year	Nominated	
2021	The Streamer Awards	Best MMORPG Streamer	Won	
2022	Esports Awards 2022	Streamer of the Year	Nominated	
2022	The Streamer Awards	Best MMORPG Streamer	Won	
2023	The Streamer Awards	Best MMORPG Streamer	Nominated	
