= Emiru =

American streamer and cosplayer (born 1998)

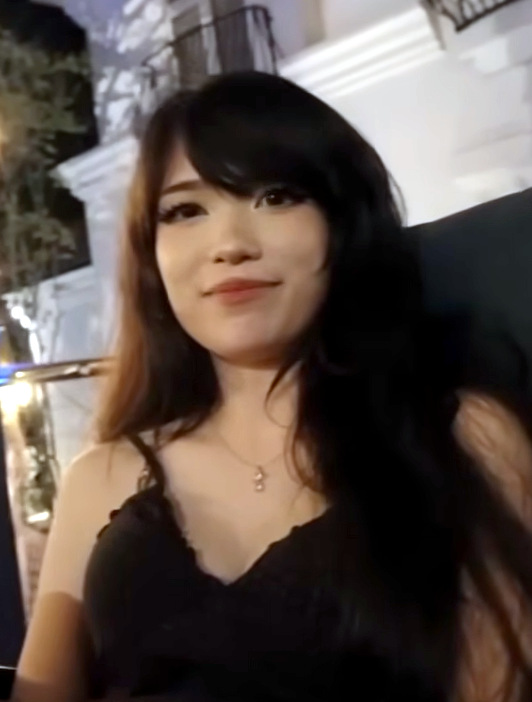
- Emiru in 2025
- Born: Emily Beth Schunk; January 3, 1998 (age 28); Wichita, Kansas, U.S.
- Occupations: Twitch streamer; cosplayer
- Organizations: Cloud9 (2020–2022); One True King (2022–present); Red Bull (2025–present)

Twitch information
- Channel: Emiru
- Years active: 2016–present
- Genres: Video games; cosplay; reactions; IRL
- Games: League of Legends; World of Warcraft; Elden Ring; Super Mario 64
- Followers: 2.1 million

YouTube information
- Channel: Emiru
- Years active: 2015–present
- Genres: Podcasting; cosplay; video games; reactions
- Subscribers: 1.59 million
- Views: 1.12 billion
- Last updated: June 7, 2026

Emily Beth Schunk (born January 3, 1998), known professionally as Emiru, is an American online streamer, YouTuber, and cosplayer. She is best known for her live-streams on Twitch, focusing on content related to video games; most notably in League of Legends earlier in her career, then transitioning to variety and cosplay. Her account has garnered more than 2.1 million followers as of 7 June 2026. She co-owns the gaming organization One True King and is a creator for Red Bull.

== Career ==
Emiru started streaming on Twitch in late 2015 while she was still in high school, playing League of Legends. She later became known for this along with her cosplays. She credits her friend for suggesting her to start streaming her League of Legends gameplay on Twitch emphasizing the potential for large donations.

On August 28, 2020, the esports organization Cloud9 announced that Emiru had joined them as a content creator.

On January 2, 2022, it became public that Emiru had joined gaming organization One True King as a content creator, resulting in the end of her contract with Cloud9. After her signing with One True King, she started to switch her content from League of Legends to variety. In March 2022, she was nominated for Best League of Legends Streamer at the 2021 Streamer Awards. In May 2022, she was represented by agency Ader Gaming. On August 7, 2022, Emiru reached one million followers on Twitch. Later that year in December 2022, she was nominated for Breakout Streamer at the 12th Streamy Awards.

On January 31, 2023, One True King publicly issued that Emiru became one of their co-owners. On the same day, plans for a weekly podcast entitled Steak & Eggs were unveiled. Hosted by Emiru and fellow One True King members Asmongold and Tectone, Episode 1 was released on February 17, 2023. The podcast hosts remained as a trio until December 2024, until Tectone stepped away due to sexual assault allegations. Emiru and Asmongold continued Steak & Eggs with Lacari as the replacement host, but this lasted two months as the podcast went on hiatus.

In August 2023, she was nominated for Streamer of the Year and Variety Streamer at the 13th Streamy Awards.

In February 2024, Emiru was nominated for Sapphire Award at the 2023 Streamer Awards. Later that year in December 2024, she was nominated for Best Just Chatting Streamer and Streamer of the Year at the 2024 Streamer Awards.

On the night of March 2, 2025, Emiru visited Los Angeles, California as a guest on Sis-a-thon — a week-long IRL live streaming marathon hosted by fellow streamers Valkyrae and Cinna — when she and the other streamers were targeted by a stalker at Pacific Park on the Santa Monica Pier. The streamers ended the marathon early and contacted the police.

In August 2025, Emiru announced she had joined Red Bull as a Red Bull athlete, though remains as an owner of OTK without a content creation contract.

Later that year, Emiru attended TwitchCon 2025, where a fan assaulted her by grabbing and attempting to kiss her during a meet and greet before her personal security intervened. Twitch claimed that the individual was immediately removed, but Emiru called the statement a “blatant lie,” saying the assaulter walked away and was only caught hours later. She also said the fan initially received only a 30-day ban from the platform before she pushed for a permanent one. Emiru criticized Twitch not taking the incident seriously and announced she would no longer attend future TwitchCon events.

In an October 25, 2025 livestream, Emiru accused streamer Mizkif of misconduct, including sexual assault, emotional abuse, and stalking. Emiru and Mizkif were in a relationship for several years, ending in 2024. According to Emiru, Mizkif threatened to retaliate if she ever spoke about the situation. Mizkif denied the more serious allegations and disputed some aspects of Emiru's account. Mizkif filed a federal lawsuit against Emiru, along with Asmongold, OTK Media Inc., Mythic Talent Management Inc., and King Gaming Labs Inc., for reputational harm, lost earnings, and emotional distress.

In December 2025, Emiru was named as part of Forbes magazine's 30 Under 30 Games 2026 list.

== Personal life ==
Emiru was born in Wichita, Kansas on January 3, 1998. She is of German and Chinese descent.

== Awards and nominations ==
Year	Ceremony	Category	Result	Ref.
2021	The Streamer Awards	Best League of Legends Streamer	Nominated	
2022	12th Streamy Awards	Breakout Streamer	Nominated	
2023	13th Streamy Awards	Streamer of the Year	Nominated	
2023	13th Streamy Awards	Variety Streamer	Nominated	
2023	The Streamer Awards	Sapphire Award	Nominated	
2024	The Streamer Awards	Best Just Chatting Streamer	Nominated	
2024	The Streamer Awards	Streamer of the Year	Nominated	
2025	The Streamer Awards	Best Creative Arts Streamer	Won	
2025	The Streamer Awards	The Sapphire Award	Nominated	

=== Listicles ===
Publisher	Year	Listicle	Result	Ref.
Forbes	2026	30 Under 30: Games	Placed	

== Filmography ==
=== Music videos ===
List of music video appearances by Emiru
Year	Title	Artist(s)	Role	Ref.
2025	"Mary Poppins"	bbno$	Herself	
