= Mizkif =

American Twitch streamer and YouTuber (born 1995)

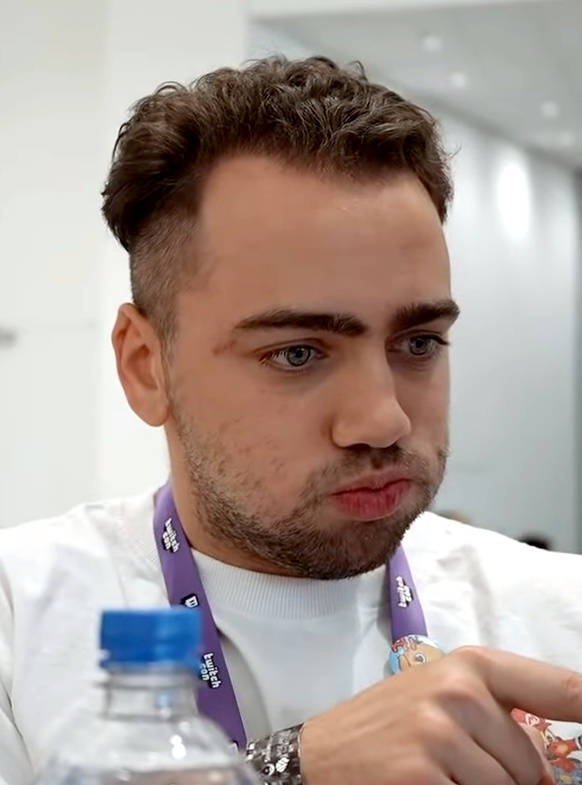
- Mizkif in 2023
- Born: Matthew Rinaudo; February 16, 1995 (age 31)
- Occupations: Twitch streamer; YouTuber

Twitch information
- Channel: Mizkif
- Years active: 2015–present
- Genres: Reaction; gaming; IRL
- Games: Smite; Super Mario 64; Pokémon; Mario Kart 8; Mario Party; Jump King; Mario Tennis
- Followers: 2.1 million

YouTube information
- Channel: Mizkif
- Years active: 2017–present
- Genres: Reaction; video gaming; IRL
- Subscribers: 992 thousand
- Views: 737 thousand
- Last updated: June 1, 2026

Matthew Rinaudo (born February 16, 1995) better known as Mizkif, is an American Twitch streamer and YouTuber. He is a founder of the gaming organization One True King. He was named Best Just Chatting Streamer at the 2021 Streamer Awards.

== Early life ==
Matthew Rinaudo was born on February 16, 1995 and grew up in Montclair, New Jersey. He is of Italian descent, with traced Jewish ancestry, and an DNA test showed his heritage is roughly 95% Italian, with small amounts of British, Irish, and Jewish heritage.

== Career ==
=== 2016–2020: Early career ===
Mizkif began streaming in 2016. He streamed to a relatively small community until 2018, when he gained popularity for serving as a cameraman for fellow streamer Paul "Ice Poseidon" Denino.

On April 30, 2019, Mizkif and fellow Twitch streamer and friend Esfand were banned in response to an incident that occurred at PAX East between them and Jenna Lynn "Meowri", a streamer and cosplayer, where Mizkif and Esfand made an insensitive joke towards Meowri during a livestream. They were then unbanned seven days later.

=== 2020–present: Established streaming years ===
In March 2020, Mizkif garnered attention after he made over $5,600 during a sleeping stream. In an interview with Wired, he stated, "Most streams can be very draining. This stream was the opposite. It was very easy. It was honestly a nice break from my normal routine of playing games all day."

Mizkif was the third-most-watched Twitch streamer during the 2020 United States presidential election, trailing fellow streamers Trainwreckstv and HasanAbi.

On October 11, 2020, Mizkif, along with fellow Twitch streamers Asmongold, Esfand, Rich Campbell, and Tips Out, announced the launch of their new gaming organization, One True King.

Mizkif hit one million followers on Twitch on January 18, 2021.

In October 2021, Mizkif appeared on the infamous Twitch leaks, which revealed the top Twitch streamers earnings from August 2019 to October 2021. Mizkif was ranked 23rd on the list, with a reported payout of $2,086,548.21 during this time period.

In March 2022, Mizkif won Best Just Chatting Streamer at the 2021 Streamer Awards. He was also nominated for Streamer of the Year at the same ceremony.

On September 19, 2022, Mizkif was accused by fellow Twitch streamer Trainwreckstv of downplaying and covering up an incident where his roommate and fellow streamer CrazySlick allegedly sexually assaulted female streamer AdrianahLee. Later that day, streamer Ice Poseidon, whom Mizkif worked with during his early streaming career, published a set of comments made by Mizkif from 2018 to 2019, characterized as racist and homophobic. The following day, as a result of the aforementioned incidents, Mizkif was placed on leave by One True King. According to the Texas-based law firm Jackson Walker, the investigation's counsel did not find direct evidence that Mizkif attempted to minimize or cover up sexual assault, as alleged. His status as an OTK member was reinstated. Later on January 2, 2023, Mizkif uploaded a video apologizing for the "insensitive" and "tone-deaf" behavior he displayed in a broadcast from early October.

Mizkif was banned from Twitch on January 13, 2023, after watching the banned streamer Grossgore during a livestream. He was eventually unbanned less than 24 hours later.

On February 7, 2023, Mizkif was banned on Twitch for violating the DMCA after he watched an American reality TV series called MILF Manor on his Twitch channel. He was then unbanned a day later. On May 28, 2023, Mizkif announced that he had joined Rumble, a video hosting site, and would stream some of his content on the platform.

== Controversies ==
In September 19, 2025, Mizkif was banned again for seven days, due to making fun of the death of the political activist and conservative commentator Charlie Kirk. During his broadcast stream, Mizkif made multiple crude remarks, including "What a Shot!" about Kirk's death which led to backlash and platform moderation.

In an October 25, 2025 livestream, cosplayer and streamer Emiru accused Mizkif of misconduct, including unwanted physical contact, emotional abuse, and stalking. Emiru and Mizkif were in a relationship for several years, ending in 2024. According to Emiru, Mizkif threatened to retaliate if she ever spoke about the situation. Mizkif denied the more serious allegations and disputed some aspects of Emiru's account. In response, on October 27, 2025, One True King disclosed on Twitter that Mizkif had been terminated from the organization for unrelated reasons "some time ago" and that he holds no stake in the organization or any of its affiliated companies. Following, Mizkif filed a federal lawsuit against Emiru, Asmongold, OTK Media Inc., Mythic Talent Management Inc., and King Gaming Labs Inc for reputational harm, lost earnings, and emotional distress.

== Other ventures ==
=== Unrooted ===
In 2021, Mizkif announced his intention to develop a platform game titled Unrooted. Citing Jump King as a primary influence, the game was showcased in the platformer category at the 2022 OTK Games Expo. Unrooted was officially released on Steam on August 2, 2024.

=== Iron Forge Gym ===
On January 17, 2024, Mizkif announced the opening of Iron Forge Gym, located in Austin, Texas, and co-owned by himself and Norwegian Twitch streamer Knut. The facility offers full-service weight lifting as well as MMA and wrestling classes.

=== Just Chatting Podcast ===
On May 6, 2024, Mizkif announced the launch of "Just Chatting Podcast", a weekly podcast hosted by himself where he interviews various guests in a one-on-one setting.

== Philanthropy ==
On December 21, 2019, Mizkif held a charity stream for St. David's Children's Hospital in Austin, Texas. His community raised over $5,000, which Mizkif would later use to purchase toys for the hospital's patients.

== Personal life ==
Mizkif began dating fellow Twitch streamer and wildlife rehabilitator Maya Higa in 2019. On September 14, 2021, Mizkif announced on Twitter that he and Higa were no longer in a relationship.

Mizkif has a heart condition known as viral myocarditis. He has also publicly spoken out about his struggles with attention deficit hyperactivity disorder (ADHD).

In early June 2021, Mizkif purchased an Audi R8. On January 3, 2022, Mizkif announced on Twitter that his Audi R8 sustained $100,000 in damages after being hit by someone in a parking lot.

== Awards and nominations ==
Year	Ceremony	Category	Work	Result	Ref.
2021	The Streamer Awards	Best Just Chatting Streamer	Himself	Won	
2021	The Streamer Awards	Streamer of the Year	Himself	Nominated	
2023	The Streamer Awards	Best Streamed Series	Schooled	Nominated	

== Filmography ==
=== Music videos ===
List of music video appearances by Mizkif
Year	Title	Artist(s)	Role	Ref.
2021	"Perfect Vibe"	Mitch Jones feat. Kala	Himself	
2021	"Booty Cheek Man"	Simply	Himself	
2022	"Dolls"	Bella Poarch	Extras	
2025	"Mary Poppins"	Bbno$	Himself	
