= The Streamer Awards =

Awards show dedicated to live streamers

- Previous: 2026 Streamer Awards; November 12, 2026
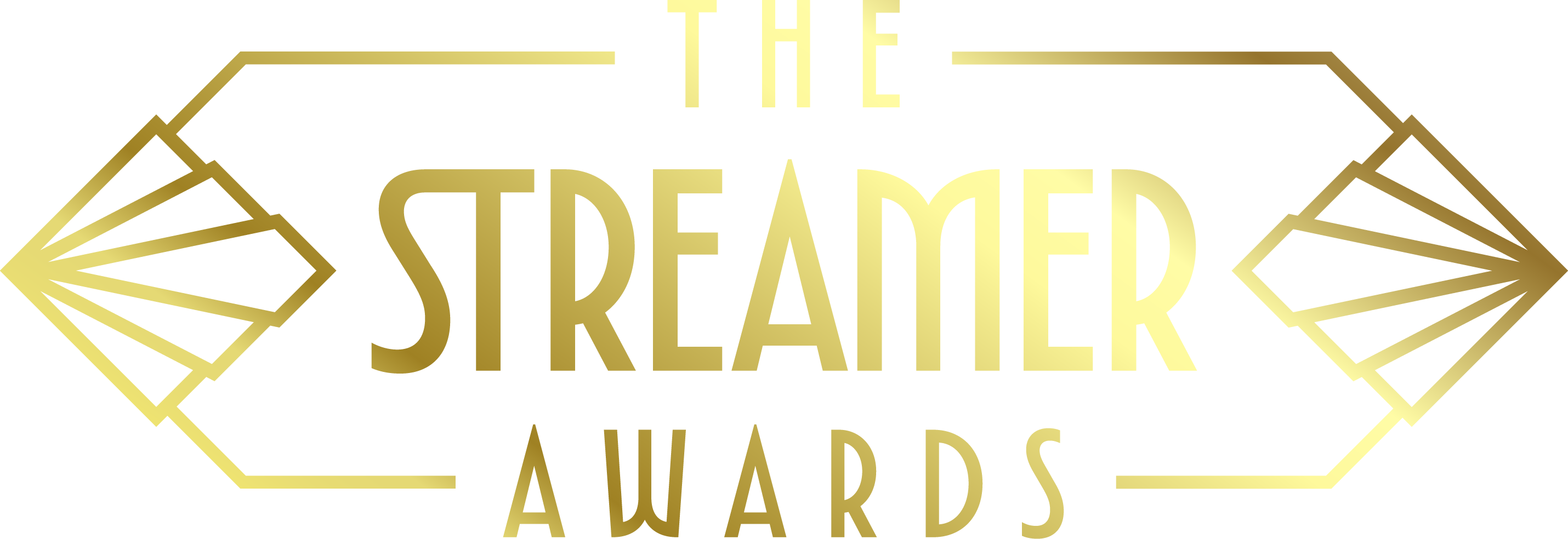
- Awarded for: Outstanding achievements in live streaming
- Location: Los Angeles, California
- Country: United States
- Hosted by: QTCinderella
- Established: 2022
- First award: March 12, 2022; 4 years ago

Highlights
- Most wins: Kai Cenat (13)
- Most nominations: Kai Cenat (18)
- Website: thestreamerawards.com

Streaming coverage
- Network: Twitch (2022–present); YouTube (2024–present)

The Streamer Awards are an annual awards show dedicated to live streamers. It was founded in 2022 by live streamer QTCinderella to award and celebrate other streamers, primarily in the Twitch community. Nominees are selected via an online vote by fans and winners are then determined using a weighted combination of the online popular vote (70%) and panelist vote (30%).

The show consists of two main segments – a red carpet show that has interviews with the nominees and internet personalities as they arrive for the show, and the main award show where nominees are reviewed and winners are revealed. At various points during the awards portion of the show there are musical performances.

The trophy presented to award winners depicts a Peepo, a variation of Pepe the Frog.

== List of ceremonies ==
Edition	Date	Venue	Hosts	Red carpet, floor, backstage hosts, and fashion panel	Peak viewership (Note: The highest number of simultaneous viewers at any point during the live broadcast)
2021 (Note: The first three editions were originally known as the 2022, 2023, and 2024 Streamer Awards, but were retroactively renumbered after the fourth edition was held in late 2024.)	March 12, 2022	The Fonda Theatre	QTCinderella; Maya Higa	NymN; Slime; JHBTeam	381,436
2022	March 11, 2023	The Wiltern	QTCinderella; Valkyrae	Ludwig Ahgren; Hasan Piker; Squeex; Sweet Anita	580,159
2023	February 17, 2024	The Wiltern	QTCinderella; Pokimane	CDawgVA; ExtraEmily; Will Neff; AustinShow; prezoh	645,166
2024	December 7, 2024	Mayan Theater	QTCinderella; TinaKitten	Valkyrae; CDawgVA; Stable Ronaldo; Sketch; JHBTeam	525,708
2025	December 6, 2025	The Wiltern	QTCinderella; Maya Higa	Sketch; Katie B; Stable Ronaldo; fanfan; prezoh; JHBTeam; Biqtch Puddin'; Godoy; Rock M. Sakura	1,028,321
2026	November 12, 2026	Avalon Hollywood	QTCinderella; Caroline Kwan	Pudgie; Tbvnks; NotQuiteLikeDuB; Stable Ronaldo; Biqtch Puddin'; Rock M. Sakura	970,656

== Categories ==
In total, The Streamer Awards have designated awards in 54 categories. The 2026 awards contained 42 categories, with 12 being absent from previous years.

=== Current categories ===
List of current Award Categories
Year introduced	Category	Year(s) awarded
2021	Best Battle Royale Streamer	2021–present
2021	Best MMORPG Streamer	2021–2023, 2025–present
2021	Best Role-Play Streamer	2021–present
2021	Best FPS Streamer	2021–present
2021	Best Strategy Game Streamer	2021–present
2021	Best Speedrun Streamer	2021–present
2021	Best VTuber	2021–present
2021	Best Music Streamer	2021–2022, 2025–present
2021	Best IRL Streamer	2021–present
2021	Best Minecraft Streamer	2021–2023, 2025–present
2021	Best Just Chatting Streamer (Note: Referred to as the "President of Chat" award in the 2026 show.)	2021–present
2021	Stream Game of The Year	2021–present
2021	Best Variety Streamer	2021–present
2021	Best Streamed Event	2021–present
2021	Best Content Group (Note: Formerly referred to as "Best Content Organization")	2021–present
2021	Rising Star Award	2021–present
2021	League of Their Own	2021–present
2021	Legacy Award	2021–present
2021	Gamer of the Year	2021–present
2021	Streamer of the Year	2021–present
2022	Best Creative Arts Streamer	2022–present
2022	Hidden Gem Award	2022–present
2022	Streamers' Choice (Note: Formerly referred to as the "Streamers' Streamer Award")	2022–present
2023	Best Fighting Games Streamer	2023–present
2023	Best Streamed Series	2023–present
2023	Best Breakout Streamer	2023–present
2023	Best International Streamer	2023–present
2023	The Sapphire Award	2023–present
2024	Best MOBA Streamer	2024–present
2024	Best Sports Streamer	2024–present
2024	Best Streamer Collab (Note: In the 2026 awards, the Best Streamed Collab category was split in two. With Best Streamer Collab being for collabs between streamers, and Best Mainstream Collab being for collabs with mainstream celebrities.)	2024–present
2024	Best Marathon Stream	2024–present
2024	Best Fortnite Streamer (Note: A part of the "Best Battle royale game Streamer" category all years besides 2024 & 2026.)	2024, 2026–present
2025	Best Brand Partner	2025–present
2025	Best Reality Streamer	2025–present
2025	Best Vertical Live Streamer	2025–present
2025	Best Stream Duo	2025–present
2026	Best Cozy Game Streamer	2026–present
2026	Best Mainstream Collab (Note: In the 2026 awards, the Best Streamed Collab category was split in two. With Best Streamer Collab being for collabs between streamers, and Best Mainstream Collab being for collabs with mainstream celebrities.)	2026–present
2026	The Morgan & Morgan Streamer Award for Biggest Crashout	2026–present
2026	The Spark Award	2026–present
2026	Best Dressed Award	2026–present

=== Discontinued categories ===
List of Discontinued Categories
Year introduced	Category	Year(s) awarded
2021	Best Super Smash Bros. Streamer (Note: Merged into the "Best Fighting Game Streamer" category.)	2021
2021	Best Chess Streamer (Note: Merged into the "Best Strategy Game Streamer" category.)	2021–2023
2021	Best ASMR Streamer (Note: Merged into the "Best Creative Arts Streamer" category.)	2021
2021	Best League of Legends Streamer (Note: Merged into the "Best MOBA Streamer" category.)	2021–2022
2021	Best Valorant Streamer (Note: Merged into the "Best FPS Streamer" category.)	2021–2022
2021	Best GTA RP Streamer (Note: Merged into the "Best Roleplay Streamer" category.)	2021
2021	Best Philanthropic Streamer	2021
2022	Best Philanthropic Stream Event	2022
2022	Best Soulslike Streamer	2022
2023	Best Software and Game Development Streamer (Note: Merged into the "Best Creative Arts Streamer" category.)	2023
2023	Best Shared Channel	2023
2025	Best Marvel Rivals Streamer (Note: Apart of Best FPS Streamer all other years)	2025

== Records ==
=== Overall wins ===
Pos.	Winner	Wins	Nominations
1	Kai Cenat	13	18
2	IShowSpeed	8	10
3	Jynxzi	6	11
4	CaseOh	5	9
5	Ludwig Ahgren	4	9
5	ironmouse	4	11
5	Quackity	4	4

=== Streamer of the Year ===
List of Streamer of the Year Winners
Year	Winner	Nominations
2021	Ludwig Ahgren	Mizkif
2021	Ludwig Ahgren	Sykkuno
2021	Ludwig Ahgren	xQc
2022	Kai Cenat	HasanAbi
2022	Kai Cenat	Jerma985
2022	Kai Cenat	xQc
2023	Kai Cenat	CaseOh
2023	Kai Cenat	ironmouse
2023	Kai Cenat	Jynxzi
2023	Kai Cenat	Quackity
2024	IShowSpeed	Caedrel
2024	IShowSpeed	Emiru
2024	IShowSpeed	Kai Cenat
2024	IShowSpeed	PirateSoftware
2025	IShowSpeed	ExtraEmily
2025	IShowSpeed	JasonTheWeen
2025	IShowSpeed	Kai Cenat
2025	IShowSpeed	plaqueboymax
2026	IShowSpeed	CaseOh
2026	IShowSpeed	Joe Bartolozzi
2026	IShowSpeed	Jynxzi
2026	IShowSpeed	Stable Ronaldo

=== The Sapphire Award ===
The Sapphire Award is for streamers who have succeeded "against the odds... in an industry where the top 97% of streamers are male, this award is dedicated to streamers who identify as female or a marginalized gender." The name for this award comes from the gemstone itself, which forms rarely in the crust of the earth.

List of Sapphire Award Winners
Year	Winner	Nominations
2023	Valkyrae	Emiru
2023	Valkyrae	ExtraEmily
2023	Valkyrae	fanfan
2023	Valkyrae	LydiaViolet
2024	Cinna	ironmouse
2024	Cinna	MissMikkaa
2024	Cinna	ExtraEmily
2024	Cinna	Valkyrae
2025	Cinna	Emiru
2025	Cinna	ExtraEmily
2025	Cinna	Vanillamace
2025	Cinna	WendolynOrtizz
2026	Vanillamace	ChristinaAndAmber
2026	Vanillamace	Cinna
2026	Vanillamace	Maya Higa
2026	Vanillamace	Yonna Jay

=== Legacy Award ===
List of Legacy Award Winners
Year	Winner	Nominations
2021	Pokimane	Scarra
2021	Pokimane	sodapoppin
2021	Pokimane	summit1g
2022	Jerma985	—N/a
2023	Maximilian_DOOD	—N/a
2024	shroud	—N/a
2025	Doublelift	—N/a
2026	Quackity	—N/a

=== Streamers' Choice ===
List of Streamers' Choice Award Winners
Year	Winner
2022	PaymoneyWubby
2023	Liam
2024	nmplol
2025	JasonTheWeen
2026	Supertf

== See also ==
- The Game Awards
- Shorty Awards
- Streamy Awards
- Webby Awards
- List of web awards
