= Trainwreckstv =

American Twitch streamer and podcaster

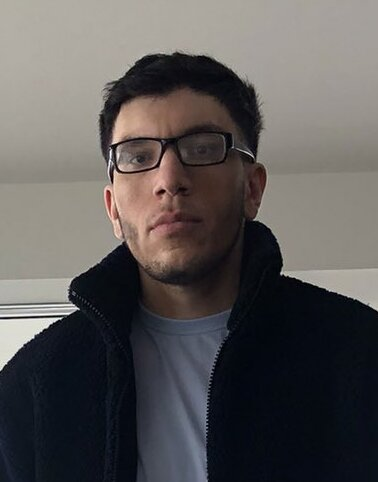
- Niknam in 2022
- Born: Tyler Faraz Niknam; December 20, 1990 (age 35); United States
- Education: Arizona State University (BA)
- Occupation: Online streamer

Kick information
- Channel: trainwreckstv
- Years active: 2022–present
- Followers: 624.9 thousand (Aug 11, 2026)

Twitch information
- Channel: Trainwreckstv
- Years active: 2015–present
- Genres: Gambling; talk show; gaming
- Followers: 2.2 million (Aug 11, 2026)

YouTube information
- Channel: Trainwreckstv
- Subscribers: 279 thousand > (Aug 11, 2026)
- Views: 41 million (Aug 11, 2026)

Tyler Faraz Niknam (born December 20, 1990), better known as Trainwreckstv or Trainwreck, is an American live streamer.

== Early life ==
Niknam was raised in Scottsdale, Arizona. He went to Chaparral High School. He is of Iranian descent. He graduated from Arizona State University in 2014, earning a bachelor's degree in analytic philosophy.

== Career ==
Niknam began streaming gaming and IRL content in 2015.

In November 2017, Niknam received a five-day ban from Twitch after he went on a rant where he referred to several female streamers as "sluts" and accused them of stealing views from those who he viewed as more deserving streamers. In an interview with Kotaku, Niknam stated that the rant was directed towards "the 0.1 percent [of women] that sexually exploit themselves for views and money and hide behind the defense or veil of sexism". He also stated that the rant was partially meant to be interpreted in a satirical manner. He later released an apology via Twitter. In October 2018, Niknam received an indefinite ban from Twitch after he stated during an Overwatch stream, that women normally play characters within the Support class and when they switch to the more aggressive Damage class they bring down the team and lose games.

In April 2019, Niknam debuted the "Scuffed Podcast" where he and several other internet personalities discuss a variety of topics.

In late 2020, Niknam began streaming Among Us and quickly gained popularity for his style of play. On October 6, he won a Code Red Among Us Tournament, taking home the grand prize of US$5,000. Digital Trends named Niknam as one of the best Among Us players on Twitch.

Niknam was the second most watched Twitch streamer during the 2020 United States presidential election, hitting 607,000 hours watched on election night (18.2% of total hours watched across Twitch). Fellow streamers Hasan Piker and Mizkif ranked at numbers one and three, respectively.

In June 2021, Niknam moved to Canada. According to Wired, Niknam often streams for multiple hours a day gambling on the cryptocurrency-based online casino Stake, which does not legally operate in the United States. Niknam and other gambling streamers on Twitch were criticized due to both the illegality of online gambling and the harmful influence that they may have on underage viewers. When Stake was banned by Twitch, Niknam switched to Kick, a new streaming platform with financial ties to Stake. Niknam is a partial owner of Kick.

In October 2022, Niknam claimed to have been paid US$360 million by sponsors to gamble on stream over a 16-month period.
