= Artesian Builds =

Defunct American custom PC manufacturing company

Artesian Future Technology LLC
- Type: Limited liability company
- Industry: Computer hardware
- Founded: 2017; 9 years ago
- Defunct: 2022
- Fate: Bankrupt
- Headquarters: San Francisco, California
- Key people: Noah Katz (CEO)
- Products: Gaming PCs
- Website: http://www.artesianbuilds.com (archived)

Artesian Future Technology LLC, doing business as Artesian Builds, was an American custom PC manufacturing company.

== History ==
Artesian Builds was founded as Artesian Future Technologies in 2017 by Noah Katz to sell cryptocurrency mining rigs. Katz's other business venture was an Etsy store selling custom cosplay armor founded in 2015. Artesian Future Technologies was rebranded in 2020 as Artesian Builds to a custom high-end PC gaming manufacturer. Artesian would build PCs live on Twitch.

== Controversy ==
On March 1, 2022, Artesian held a Twitch live stream where it held sweepstakes to give away a PC. A streamer, Kiapiaa, won the giveaway, but Katz refused to give her the PC, claiming that she did not meet the requirements to be an "ambassador" because she didn't have a big enough social media following. Katz proceeded to reroll the sweepstakes. The decision caused an immediate uproar, with the company apologizing.

== Bankruptcy and aftermath ==
On March 9, 2022, Artesian announced that it suspended all of its activities. On June 18, 2022, Artesian announced that it was holding a bankruptcy auction to sell off its assets. The assets sold in the auction included PC components, PCs, and GPUs.
