= Sodapoppin =

American Twitch streamer and YouTuber (born 1994)

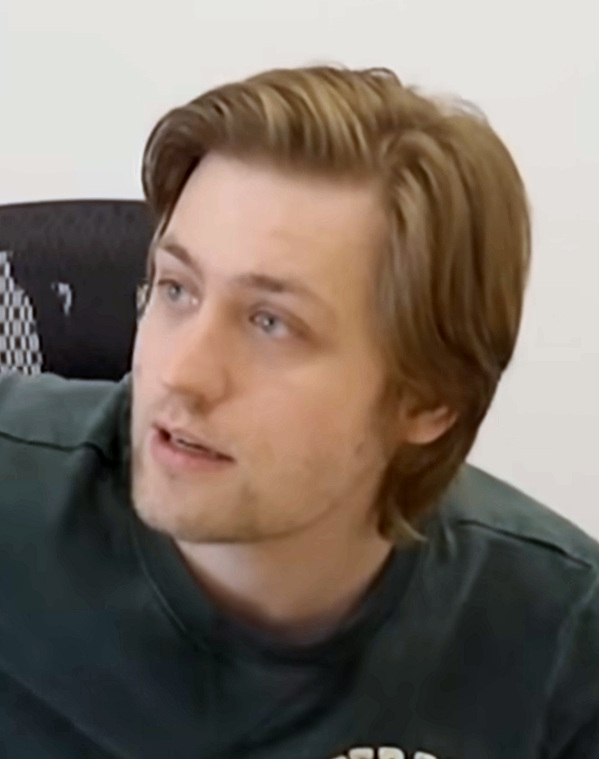
- Morris in 2024
- Born: Thomas Chance Morris; February 15, 1994 (age 31); Austin, Texas, U.S.
- Occupations: Twitch streamer; YouTuber
- Organizations: One True King; NRG Esports; Northern Gaming

Twitch information
- Channel: sodapoppin
- Years active: 2011–present
- Followers: 8.9 million

YouTube information
- Channel: Sodapoppin
- Years active: 2012–present
- Subscribers: 1.1 million
- Views: 480.7 million
- Last updated: November 26, 2024

Thomas Chance Morris (born February 15, 1994), known professionally as Sodapoppin, is an American Twitch streamer and YouTuber. He has one of the largest followings on Twitch, with over 8.9 million followers as of November 26, 2024; he also has over 1.1 million subscribers and over 480.7 million views on YouTube. According to Social Blade, Morris sits at the number 16 spot for the most followers on Twitch; he also ranks number 15 for the largest total number of views on the platform. He is a co-owner of and content creator for gaming organization One True King.

== Career ==
Morris began streaming on Twitch in 2012 after switching from Xfire.

In 2014 and 2015, Morris was streaming blackjack gambling on casino websites, winning and losing thousands of dollars on any given day. In May 2015, Morris lost $5,000 on one hand with over 43,000 viewers watching him.

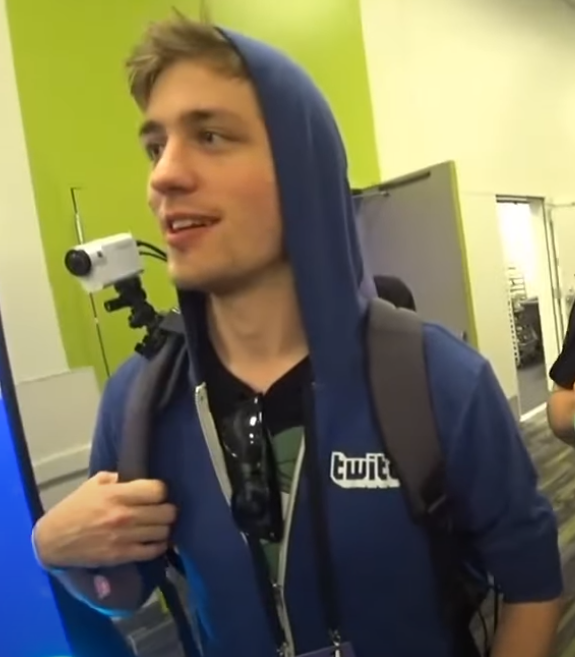
Morris at TwitchCon 2018

Morris co-owned Canadian esports organization Northern Gaming, which was founded in May 2016. In August 2017, the organization was purchased by NRG Esports, which is owned by Shaquille O'Neal, Alex Rodriguez, and others. Morris subsequently joined its ownership group and became an advisor of NRG Esports. In regards to Northern Gaming's short-lived career, Esports Insider stated, "It's the end of a short road for Northern Gaming, but their story will be looked back on as an example of achieving quick success in esports."

Morris has been credited for causing a spike in popularity of social deduction game Among Us, which was originally released in 2018 but exploded in popularity in the summer of 2020 during the COVID-19 pandemic. According to Forest Willard, programmer and co-founder of Innersloth, "The first thing we really noticed was a Twitch stream from Sodapoppin. We had various moments where we were like, 'We're doing well,' but it was that point where we saw that a lot of people and other streamers started to climb onboard."

On July 20, 2020, Morris was banned from Twitch after playing VRChat on stream, where inside the game there's multiple characters that wore revealing clothes that may have broken Twitch’s sexually explicit content rules. He was then unbanned a day later.

In October 2021, Morris appeared in the infamous Twitch leaks, which disclosed the top Twitch streamers' revenue from August 2019 to October 2021. Morris placed 43rd on the list, with a reported payout of $1,461,302.14 for this time period.

On April 13, 2022, Morris was banned for two weeks from Twitch after a stream he did on April 9 where he applied makeup to a generic face in a game he was playing while declaring “blackface” at the same time.

On July 21, 2022, gaming organization One True King announced Morris as their newest member and co-owner.

== Personal life ==
Morris is currently in a relationship with fellow Twitch streamer and VTuber Veibae.

== Awards and nominations ==
Year	Ceremony	Category	Result	Ref.
2021	The Streamer Awards	Legacy Award	Nominated	
2023	The Streamer Awards	Best MMORPG Streamer	Won	
2025	The Streamer Awards	Best MMORPG Streamer	Won	

== See also ==
- List of most-followed Twitch channels
