= Botez =

Botez is a Romanian surname. It means baptism. Notable people with the surname include:

== People ==
=== Arts ===
- Demostene Botez (1893–1973), Romanian poet and writer
- Eugeniu Botez (1874–1933), Romanian novelist
- Manya Botez (1896–1971), Romanian pianist and piano teacher
- Oana Botez, Romanian-American costume designer for theatre, opera etc.
- Octav Botez (1884–1943), Romanian literary historian and academic

=== Sports and games ===
- Alexandra Botez (born 1995), American-Canadian chess player, born to Romanian parents
- Andrea Botez (born 2002), Canadian chess player, born to Romanian parents
- Dumitru Botez (born 1973), Romanian footballer
- Eugen Botez (1948–2026), Romanian canoeist
- Mihai Botez (gymnast) (1922–2011), Romanian gymnast

=== Other people ===
- Calypso Botez (1880–1933), Romanian women's rights activist
- Mihai Botez (mathematician) (1940–1995), a Romanian mathematician and political dissident
- Mihai Ioan Botez (1927–1998), Romanian neurologist
- Ruxandra Botez (born 1960), Romanian aerospace engineering professor

== Other ==
- Botez, a village in Ațintiș Commune, Mureș County, Romania
