= Dina Belenkaya =

Russian chess player (born 1983)

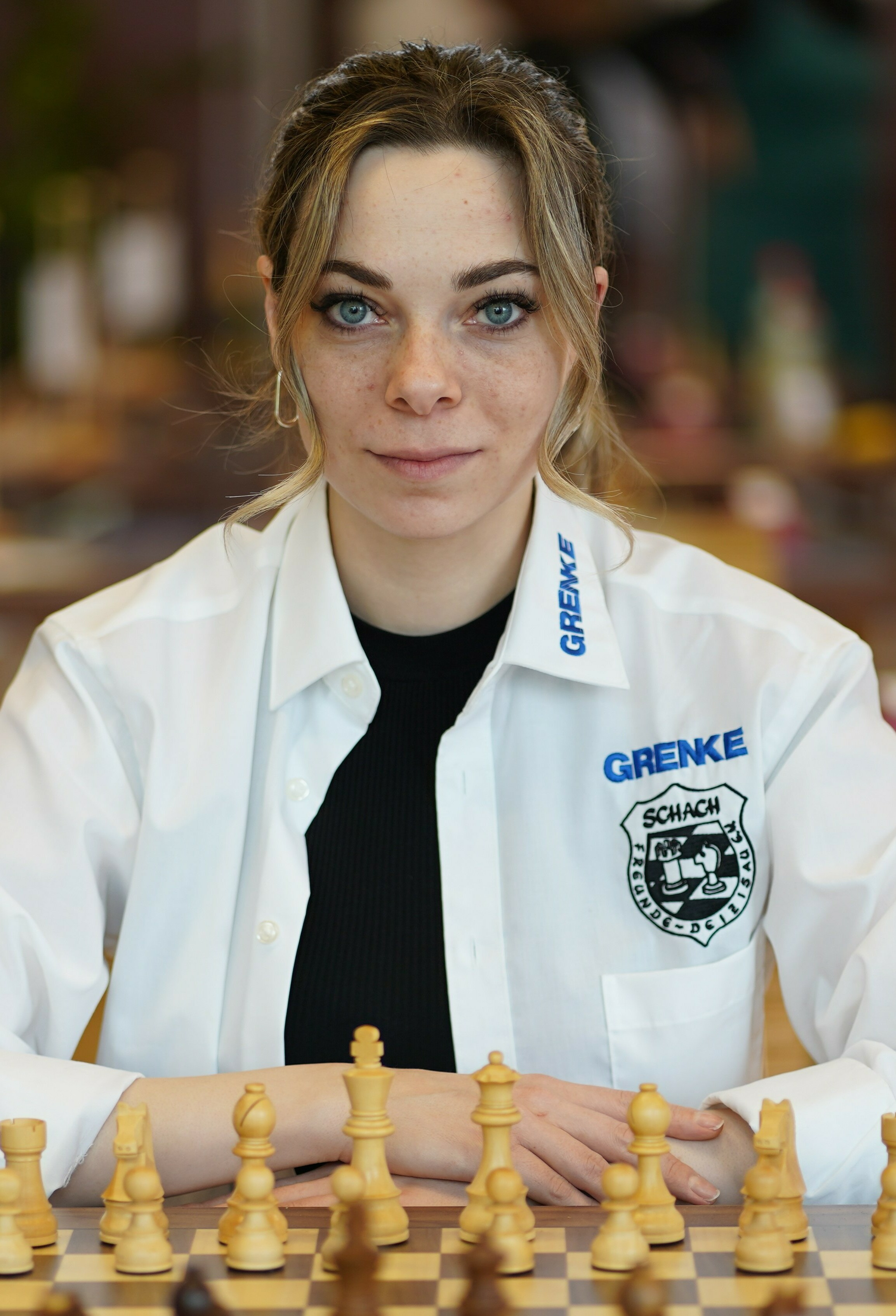
- Belenkaya in 2023
- Born: Dina Vadimovna Belenkaya; 22 December 1993 (age 32); Saint Petersburg, Russia
- Chess career
- Country: Russia (until 2022); Israel (2022–2026); France (since 2026)
- Title: Woman Grandmaster (2016)
- FIDE rating: 2184 (March 2026)
- Peak rating: 2364 (February 2019)

Twitch information
- Channel: dinabelenkaya
- Years active: 2020–present
- Genre: Gaming
- Game: Chess
- Followers: 115K

YouTube information
- Channel: Dina Belenkaya
- Subscribers: 958 thousand
- Views: 1.26 billion
- Last updated: 22 June 2026

Dina Vadimovna Belenkaya (Russian: Дина Вадимовна Беленькая; born 22 December 1993) is a Russian chess player, commentator, Twitch streamer, and YouTuber. She holds the title of Woman Grandmaster (WGM), and has represented France since 2026. She is a four-time St. Petersburg women's champion and has represented St. Petersburg at the Russian Women's Team Championship and the European Chess Club Cup for Women. She has a peak FIDE rating of 2364.

Belenkaya was taught how to play chess at age three by her mother, a local children's chess coach. Despite limited achievements at the junior level, Belenkaya has had more success in adult competitions, beginning with her victory in the Russian Women's Championship First League in 2011 at age 17. She earned the Woman Grandmaster title in 2016 after achieving norms at open tournaments in France in three successive years beginning in 2014. She exceeded the score requirement for all three of her WGM norms, and earned International Master (IM) norms at each of these tournaments as well. Having obtained all three of the IM norms that are required, she only needs to reach the rating threshold of 2400 to be awarded the IM title. Belenkaya's best tournament performance was at the 2014 Open International d'Echecs d'Avoine, where she earned WGM and IM norms with a bronze medal finish and a performance rating of 2557. She was a participant at the 2021 Women's Chess World Cup, having qualified through her result at the 2019 European Individual Women's Chess Championship. Belenkaya switched federations from Russia to Israel in March 2022 then from Israel to France in June 2026.

Belenkaya and her sister Asya had Twitch and YouTube channels named TheBelenkaya that were launched in 2020. Belenkaya is also a regular commentator for online and over-the-board chess events.

== Early life and background ==
Dina Vadimovna Belenkaya was born on 22 December 1993 in St. Petersburg. Her mother Asya Kovalyova has been a children's chess coach for over 30 years and notably was the first coach of Anish Giri, who has since become a Grandmaster (GM) and has been ranked as high as No. 3 in the world. Belenkaya learned how to play chess from her mother at age three and began competing at age five. When she was 10 years old, she began working with Andrey Praslov, a FIDE Master (FM) who was a coach at the same chess club as her mother.

== Chess career ==
=== 2007–14: Russian First League winner, first IM norm ===
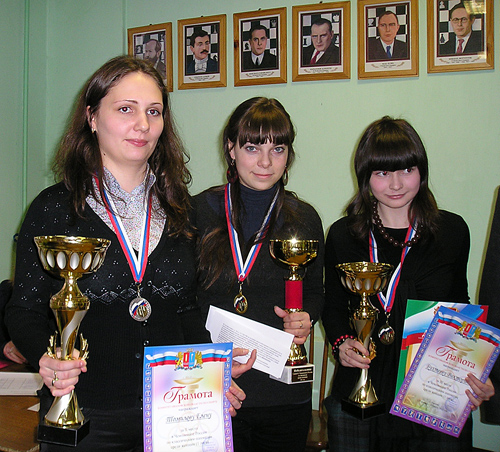
Belenkaya (center) with the winner's trophy for the 2011 Russian Women's Championship First League

Belenkaya earned her first FIDE rating in April 2007 at age 13, starting out at 1872 after participating in the Winter on Petrograd Side Open in January. The next month, she played the St. Petersburg Women's Championship for the first time. Belenkaya reached a rating of 2000 in October 2008 at age 14 after a good performance in the Lyudmila Rudenko Memorial Women's Open where she scored an even 4/8 (Note: 4 points in 8 games. (A win is 1 point, a draw is a ½ point, and a loss is 0 points.)) against opponents with a much higher average rating of 2242. At the end of the year, she finished in joint first at the under-18 girls' St. Petersburg Championships with a score of 6½/9.

Belenkaya first reached a rating of 2100 in 2010 and a rating of 2200 at the end of 2011. She was awarded the Woman FIDE Master (WFM) title in 2010. Her best result of 2011 came in February when she won the Russian Women's Championship First League in Ivanovo at age 17. She scored 8/9 against opponents with an average rating of 2192. She compiled a performance rating of 2543 and had three wins against players rated above 2300, namely Maria Fominykh, Inna Ivakhinova, and Daria Charochkina. This was the last edition of the First League. During 2012, Belenkaya finished in joint fourth with a score of 5½/9 at the Cup of Russia women's second stage, behind Olga Girya, Aleksandra Goryachkina, and Ekaterina Timofeeva, all of whom were much higher rated.

Belenkaya continued to maintain a rating in the low 2200s through mid-2014. Early in 2013, she defeated Igor Shvyrjov, an Estonian Grandmaster rated 2470, in the IM group of the Paul Keres Memorial Festival. After a bronze medal in the Russian girls' under-21 junior championship, she participated in the European Individual Women's Chess Championship for the first time. With the tournament in Belgrade, she scored 5/11, highlighted by an opening round win against Elisabeth Pähtz, a German International Master (IM) rated 2454. Belenkaya had her first significant rating increase since 2011 during the August 2014 rating period when she gained over 100 rating points from two tournaments to rise to 2329, above the threshold of 2300 needed for the Woman Grandmaster (WGM) title. First, she gained 30 rating points at the European Individual Women's Chess Championship with an even score of 5½/11 against opponents with an average rating of 2321. She followed up this result by winning the bronze medal at the Open International d'Echecs d'Avoine in France behind two Grandmasters, Maxime Lagarde and Alon Greenfeld. She scored 7/9 with a performance rating of 2557, highlighted by victories over four International Masters. Her only loss was to the tournament winner Lagarde. Overall, she gained 76 rating points. She also earned her first WGM norm by scoring well above the 5½ points that were required, and also earned her first IM norm.

=== 2015–present: Woman Grandmaster title, remaining IM norms ===
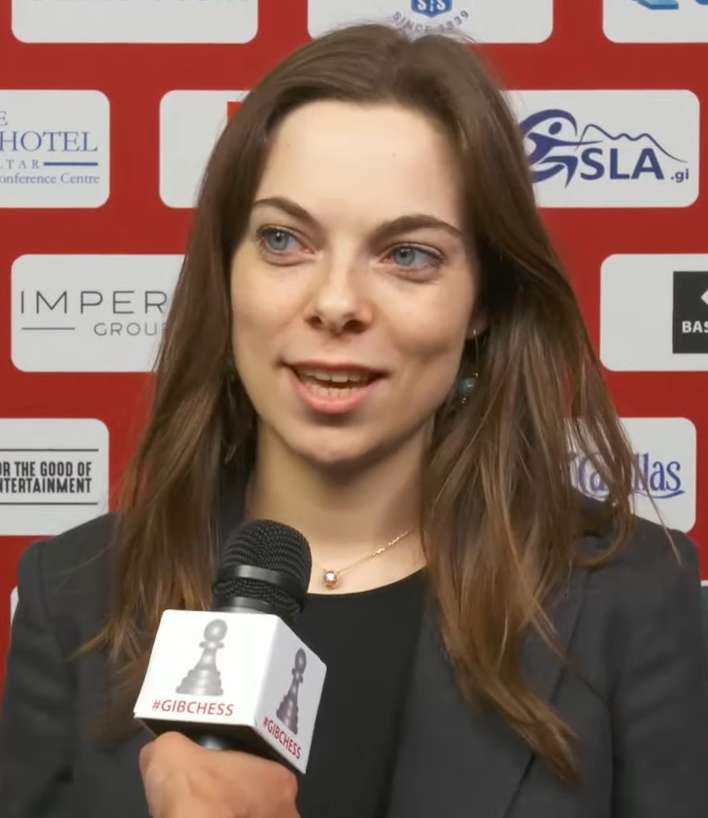
Belenkaya being interviewed at the 2020 Gibraltar Chess Festival

For much of her career as an adult, Belenkaya has kept her rating in-between 2250 and 2350. Amidst a series of poor results in the first half of 2015 that led her rating to drop as low as 2213, she had a good result in March when she won the St. Petersburg Women's Championship for the first time. She scored 7½/9, a ½ point ahead of runner-up Alina Balaian. In the second half of the year, Belenkaya regained all of the rating points she had lost and reached a new peak rating of 2352. Her biggest rating increase was again in August, when she gained 30 points in the Russian Women's Championship Higher League and 62 points at the Festival International de Condom in France. The latter tournament was a ten-player round-robin. Despite being the lowest-rated player, she scored 6/9 to finish runner-up to Serghei Vedmediuc, a Moldovan IM. She earned both her second WGM norm and her second IM norm, the former of which with a ½ point more than what was needed.

Belenkaya was awarded the Woman Grandmaster title in 2016. For the second consecutive year, she earned both a WGM norm and an IM norm at the Festival International de Condom, thereby clinching the WGM title. As the second-lowest rated player, she finished in joint first with three other players a score of 6/9, but came in fourth because of the tiebreak criteria. Her score was 1 point higher than the required score for the WGM norm. During 2017, Belenkaya won the bronze medal at the Moscow Open B, the women's division of the tournament, behind Oksana Gritsayeva and Alina Kashlinskaya. At the end of the year, she won another bronze medal by reaching the semifinals of the Russian Cup for Women. She knocked out Alexandra Makarenko in the first round before losing to Elena Tomilova.

In 2017, Belenkaya was reprimanded by the FIDE Ethics Commission for making a "reckless and unjustified" accusation of cheating against Mihaela Sandu during the 2015 European Individual Women's Chess Championship.

Early in 2018, Belenkaya defeated Luke McShane, an English Grandmaster, at the Bunratty Masters, a six-round unrated Swiss tournament in Ireland. With a rating of 2643 at the time, McShane is the highest-rated player she has defeated. Belenkaya's best tournament performances in 2018 included winning the St. Petersburg Women's Championship for the second time and gaining 42 rating points in the Serbian Women's League. She reached a peak rating of 2364 early the following year in February 2019. One of her best results in 2019 was at the European Individual Women's Chess Championship in Antalya, where she scored 7/11 to finish in 22nd place and earn the 14th and final qualification spot for the inaugural Women's World Cup. She defeated three International Masters during the event, namely Nataliya Buksa, Evgenija Ovod, and Sophie Milliet, the last two of which in the final two rounds.

Belenkaya won the St. Petersburg Women's Championship for a third and a fourth time in 2020 and 2021 to give her the sixth most tournament wins among women in the city's history. At the inaugural Women's World Cup in 2021, Belenkaya was the 66th seed out of 103 competitors. She was eliminated in the first round by 63rd seed Teodora Injac, losing both classical games. Belenkaya changed her federation to Israel in March 2022.

== Team competitions ==
=== National events ===
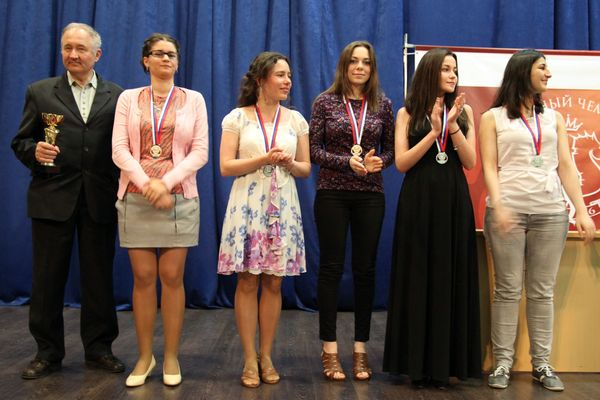
Belenkaya (third from right) at the 2016 Russian Team Championship

Belenkaya has competed in the Russian Women's Team Championship six times since 2015. Representing the St. Petersburg team SDYUSSHOR SHSH (Specialized Children and Youth Olympic Reserve School Chess and Checkers) in 2015, she won a silver medal in the 2015 ten-team tournament together with Anastasia Bodnaruk, Evgenija Ovod, and Alina Balaian. This result also earned them a place in the European Club Cup later that year. Individually, Belenkaya did not fare well, scoring 3/7 and losing 9 rating points. Belenkaya fared better at her following appearances in the event, gaining rating points at her next five Russian Women's Team Championships. The team won the silver medal again in 2016 with a similar set of players, only moving Balaian to the reserve board and replacing her with Anna Styazhkina. Belenkaya scored 5/8 and gained 10 rating points. While the team only won the bronze medal in 2017 and 2018, Belenkaya scored 5/7 and 6/8 those years, gaining 16 and 11 rating points respectively. The team won the silver medal again in 2019. Although they did not win a medal in 2021, Belenkaya had a performance rating of 2434, her best at the event, and gained 37 rating points.

=== International events ===
Belenkaya also played on the same SDYUSSHOR SHSH team for the European Club Cup for Women. At the 2015 event, SDYUSSHOR SHSH finished in seventh place out of twelve teams. They finished in seventh place again the following year in 2016, this time out of fourteen teams. Like the national competition, Belenkaya had a better result in her second appearance, scoring 4½/7 and gaining rating points in 2016 compared to a score of 3½/7 in 2015 that lost her rating points. Belenkaya's best team result was in 2018 when the competition was divided into a two-group six-team round-robin stage and a three-group four-team two-round knockout stage in which the groups were determined by the round-robin placings. SDYUSSHOR SHSH qualified for the top knockout group and finished in fourth place. Although Belenkaya lost rating points in both 2018 and 2019, her victories against higher-rated players Stavroula Tsolakidou and Zhansaya Abdumalik helped her team earn opening-round draws in both instances.

=== Leagues ===
Belenkaya has competed in the Women's Bundesliga in Germany since 2015. She has played for Bad Königshofen since 2016 after her original team, SF 1891 Friedberg, dissolved after her first year. With Belenkaya playing for the club, Bad Königshofen won the league in back-to-back editions in 2018–19 and 2019–21. Belenkaya had excellent results in both championship seasons. She scored 8½/9 during the 2018–19 season, defeating all of her opponents except Karina Ambartsumova, a Woman Grandmaster rated 2396. Her overall performance rating was 2537. The following season, Bad Königshofen entered the final round needing a draw against second-place SK Schwäbisch Hall to clinch the title. In the final match, Belenkaya defeated Irina Bulmaga, an International Master rated 2396, to help her team draw the match and win the league. Overall, Belenkaya had a score of 6½/8, corresponding to a performance rating of 2453 and also highlighted by a win against Zhansaya Abdumalik, who was rated 2471 at the time.

Belenkaya has also competed in leagues in France and Serbia. In late 2019, Belenkaya defeated Momchil Nikolov, a Grandmaster rated 2557, in the French league. Belenkaya played on the top board for the Sahmatni Kruzok team based in Novi Sad for the 2019 Serbian Women's League.

== Playing style ==
Belenkaya has a strong preference for playing 1.e4 (the King's Pawn Game) with the white pieces over any other first moves. With the black pieces, she commonly defends against 1.e4 with the Caro–Kann Defence (1.e4 c6) and commonly defends against 1.d4 (the Queen's Pawn Game) with the Queen's Gambit Accepted (1.d4 d5 2.c4 dxc4).

== Broadcasting career ==
Belenkaya began streaming chess on Twitch in April 2020 towards the beginning of the COVID-19 pandemic after being invited by Alexandra Botez to compete in the Isolated Queens women's online chess tournament that she was organizing. Belenkaya used the fact that only competitors who streamed their participation were eligible for prizes as motivation to figure out how to stream and launch a channel. She signed to stream for Chess.com early that April and collaborates with other streamers who are part of their platform. Her sister Asya, an artist and a beginner-level chess player, later joined the channel around July 2020, adding more variety. Around the same time that Belenkaya started streaming on Twitch, she also launched a YouTube channel with similar types of content. Both the Twitch and YouTube channels are eponymously named TheBelenkaya in reference to the two sisters.

Belenkaya has served as a commentator both for over-the-board and online events. She was an official commentator for the 2021 World Cup with Aleksandr Shimanov, a Russian Grandmaster. She conducted the official post-game interviews at the 2022 FIDE Grand Prix. For Chess.com, she has commentated for a variety of their online events including the weekly Titled Tuesdays and the Speed Chess Championship.

Belenkaya participated in the Mogul Chessboxing Championship, a chessboxing exhibition event in December 2022 organized by Ludwig Ahgren featuring content creators competing. She fought Andrea Botez as one of only two matches between actual competitive chess players. Belenkaya originally won the match in the chess segment with a mate-in-one on the board when Botez resigned. A day afterwards though, both fighters were credited with a win after the organizers deemed the referee should have stopped the match as a technical knockout for Botez because Belenkaya needed one more stoppage than allotted in the last boxing round.

== Personal life ==
Belenkaya is Jewish. She graduated from St. Petersburg State Polytechnic University in 2018 with a degree in applied linguistics. She is trilingual with fluency in English, Russian, and French, having learned the latter in part through spending two semesters in France. Belenkaya is a Master of Sports of Russia.

== Notable games ==
Belenkaya vs. Gajewski, 2023

Position: a8 black rook, b8 black knight, d8 black queen, h8 black rook, d7 black pawn, e7 black bishop, g7 black pawn, h7 black pawn, a6 black pawn, e6 black pawn, f6 black knight, f5 black pawn, g5 black king, a4 white knight, b4 black pawn, c4 white pawn, d4 white knight, g4 white pawn, f3 white pawn, a2 white pawn, b2 white pawn, e2 white queen, h2 white pawn, a1 white rook, e1 white rook, g1 white king

Position after 14. Bg5 Kf7 15. Qe2 Kg6 16. g4 Kxg5

Position: a8 black rook, h8 black rook, d7 black pawn, g7 black pawn, a6 black pawn, c6 black knight, e6 white pawn, g6 black king, h6 black pawn, a5 black queen, c5 white pawn, g5 white rook, a4 white knight, b4 black pawn, f4 white queen, h4 white pawn, f3 white pawn, a2 white pawn, b2 white pawn, a1 white rook, h1 white king

Position after 24. Qf4+ Kg6 25. Kh1 h6 26. Rg1+ Bg5 27. Rxg5+

- Dina Belenkaya (2300) – Grzegorz Gajewski (2587), 2023 Reykjavik Open: Round 4; Sicilian defence: Pin variation, 1–0. Belenkaya made a video recap analyzing the game, which included a small amount of commentary by Jon Ludvig Hammer, a GM who was commentating on the game. Some of Belenkaya's comments are included below, as well as Hammer's commentary at the end of the game.

1. e4 c5 2. Nf3 e6 3. Nc3 a6 4. g3 b5 5. Bg2 Bb7 6. d4 cxd4 7. Nxd4 b4 ("The most principled approach for Black and probably the only one that equalizes.") 8. Na4 Nf6 9. O-O Bxe4 10. Bxe4 Nxe4 11. c4 Be7 12. Re1 ("A question, what are you going to do with your knight?") f5 ("My opponent went for f5 and f5 is already a little bit edgy.") 13. f3 Nf6 14. Bg5 ("How is Black going to castle?") Kf7 ("My opponent played this very edgy and first kind of uh-oh Kf7 move. I do understand it.") 15. Qe2 ("I came up with this very particular very interesting move Qe2... What I do have is that I block the knight [on b8]. It's not so clear what to do here with Black.") Kg6 ("The move Black did in the game is just crazy. But I do understand the idea behind it... Black was trying to scare me, attacking my bishop, hoping I would take the knight [with the bishop]") 16. g4 (" No way you're going to take my bishop... here, we go g4, first brilliant move.") Kxg5 ("What is he doing?... Calm down... You [Dina] are about to hunt a GM's king.") 17. gxf5 Kh6 18. fxe6 Qa5 19. c5 ("Second brilliant move of this game.") Nc6 20. Nf5+ Kg5 21. h4+ ("It did take me another 10 minutes to take the courage to sac a second piece.") Kxf5 22. Qd3+ Ne4 23. Qxe4+ Kf6 24. Qf4+ Kg6 25. Kh1 ("A bunch of ideas how to mate... Let's bring my rooks into the fire.") h6 26. Rg1+ Bg5 27. Rxg5+ ("Obviously I saw this very beautiful Rxg5+... After Kh7, I [incorrectly] thought Qh5 was a mate... [but] then I saw that even if I had to sacrifice one rook I would still have another one.") hxg5 28. Qxg5+ Kh7 29. Qh5+ Kg8 30. Qf7+ Kh7 31. Rg1 ("No defence against the mate.") (Hammer: "Rg1, checkmate in one move, the grandmaster resigns and compliments Dina on the game. Amazing play from Dina! Amazing attacking play. She sacrificed her bishop. She sacrificed her knight. Then she sacrificed her rook. She sacrificed pretty much every piece she had on the board and she takes home the win!") 1–0

Belenkaya vs. McShane, 2018

Position: a8 black rook, d8 black queen, e8 black rook, g8 black king, e7 black bishop, f7 black pawn, g7 black pawn, f6 black knight, h6 black pawn, c5 black pawn, d5 black pawn, f4 white queen, h4 white bishop, b3 white pawn, a2 white pawn, c2 white pawn, e2 white bishop, f2 white pawn, g2 white pawn, h2 white pawn, a1 white rook, f1 white rook, g1 white king

Position after 17. Qf4 Bxe2 18. Bxe2 h6 19. Bh4

Position: f8 black king, a7 black rook, e7 black queen, f7 black pawn, h7 white queen, e6 black rook, h6 black pawn, c5 black pawn, d5 black pawn, f5 white bishop, g5 black pawn, d4 black bishop, b3 white pawn, f3 white pawn, g3 white pawn, c2 white pawn, g2 white pawn, d1 white rook, f1 white rook, h1 white king

Position after 28. hxg3 Ra7 29. Qh7+ Kf8 30. Bf5

- Dina Belenkaya (2286) – Luke McShane (2643), 2018 Bunratty Masters: Round 2; Four Knights Game: Scotch variation, 1–0. Raymond Keene, an English GM and journalist, annotated the game. Selected annotations from Keene are included below.

1. e4 e5 2. Nf3 Nc6 3. Nc3 Nf6 4. d4 exd4 5. Nxd4 Bb4 6. Nxc6 bxc6 7. Bd3 d5 8. exd5 O-O ("Black can safely offer a gambit here and White does well to decline it, preferring to castle") 9. O-O cxd5 10. Bg5 c6 11. Qf3 Rb8 12. Ne2 ("12 Bxf6 would give White the better pawn structure but after 12 ... Qxf6 13 Qxf6 gxf6 the black bishops provide ample compensation. In practice, Black has scored very well from this position.") 12...Be7 13. b3 ("White could also play more directly with the immediate 13 Nd4. A possible line is then 13 ... Bd7 14 Rae1 and if now 14 ... Rxb2 then 15 Nf5 Bxf5 16 Qxf5 g6 17 Qf3 Ne4 leads to complex play. ") 13... Bg4 14. Qe3 Re8 15. Qxa7 Ra8 16. Qd4 c5 17. Qf4 Bxe2 18. Bxe2 h6 19. Bh4 Bd6 ("19 ... g5 is far too weakening. White can continue 20 Bxg5 hxg5 21 Qxg5+ Kh8 22 Qh6+ Kg8 23 Bb5 Rf8 24 Rad1 followed by Rd3 with a winning attack.") 20. Qf3 Be5 21. Rad1 g5 22. Bg3 Rxa2 ("Black would do better to play 22 ... g4 23 Qd3 Rxa2 when White no longer has the possibility of Bb5 and the position is equal.") 23. Bb5 Re6 24. Qf5 Bd4 25. Bd3 Qe7 26. Kh1 ("White misses 26 c4 which is very strong. After 26 ... dxc4 27 Bxc4 White wins material as the rook on e6 cannot move due to the reply Qg6+. Black could have avoided this problem with 25 ... Qd7 26 c4 Re7.") 26... Ne4 27. f3 Nxg3+ 28. hxg3 Ra7 ("This loses material. Black had to play the unintuitive 28 ... Rd6 29 Rde1 Re6! which, surprisingly, holds the balance as 30 Rxe6 Qxe6 is fine for Black.") 29. Qh7+ Kf8 30. Bf5 ("Now Black’s problem is that if the rook moves White can continue 31 Rxd4 and 32 Qh8 mate.") 30... Qf6 31. Bxe6 Qxe6 32. f4 g4 33. f5 ("With the extra material and the initiative, White is winning easily.") 33... Qf6 34. Rf4 Re7 35. Rxg4 Re2 36. c3 Be5 37. Rxd5 Ke7 38. Qg8 Bd6 39. Ra4 Bc7 40. Rxc5 Qd6 41. f6+ Ke6 42. Qe8+ Kxf6 43. Rf4+ Qxf4 44. Qh8+ Ke7 45. gxf4 Bxf4 46. g3 1–0
