= Mihai Botez =

Mihai Botez may refer to:

- Mihai Botez (gymnast) (1922–2011), Romanian gymnast who competed in the 1952 Summer Olympics
- Mihai Botez (mathematician) (1940–1995), Romanian mathematician and political dissident
- Mihai Ioan Botez (1927–1998), Romanian neurologist
