= Romanian School of Neurology =

The Romanian School of Neurology influenced a great share of Romanian and foreign neurologists, descending from a group of Gheorghe Marinescu's co-workers at the Neurological Department of the Colentina Hospital at the University of Bucharest. One can therefore also speak of Marinescu's School of Neurology.

Marinescu's closest collaborators were Ion Minea (with contributions to neuroinfections), Anghel Radovici (with whom Marinescu described the kinn reflex, author of the monograph La Syphilis nerveuse, 1928), Nicolae Ionescu-Sisești (who was his successor as head of the department, author of the monographs Tumeurs Médullaires, 1929, Syringobulbie, 1932), State Drăgănescu (author of the book Lichidul cefalo-rahidian (The Cerebrospinal Fluid), 1932 and of the monograph Encefalite Virotice Umane (Human Viral Encephalitis, 1962, with Arcadie Petrescu), Oscar Sager (Head of the department after the death of Ionescu-Sisești in 1954, author of studies on the physiology of the thalamus with J. G. Dusser de Barenne), Arthur Kreindler (co-author of the Marinescu's monograph Les Reflexes Conditionnelles, 1935, author of the monographs Epilepsia (Epilepsy), 1955, La Physiologie et Physiopathologie du cervelet, 1958, with Mircea Steriade, Anatomo-fiziologia clinică a sistemului nervos central (Clinical anatomo-physiology of the central nervous system), 1957, with Vlad Voiculescu), Afazia (Aphasia, 1962, with Alexandru Fradis), Emmerich Façon (contributions to clinical neurology and neuroinfections).

Starting from 1954, Arthur Kreindler, in his double position as director of the Institute of Neurology of the Romanian Academy and head of the post-graduate chair of Neurology at the University of Bucharest, surrounded himself with personalities such as State Drăgănescu, Theodor Horneț, and Vlad Voiculescu. The chair organized post-graduate specialization in neurology, training many neurologists all over the country.

The central themes of clinical research were epilepsy, cerebro-vascular diseases, viral encephalitis, and aphasia. Basic research dealt especially with states of consciousness, physiology of the thalamus, conditioned reflexes, and so on. From the initial anatomo-clinical orientation, Romanian neurology evolved to a neurophysiological one, involving such modern topics as neurochemistry, neurogenetics, and neuropsychology.

The following neurologists from the next generation should be quoted: Mihai Ioan Botez, Victor Ionășescu, Ion N. Petrovici, Jean-Jacques Askenasy, and Mircea Steriade.

Presently the main representative of Marinescu's school of neurology in Romania is Constantin Popa, head of the neurological department at the Carol Davila University of Medicine and Pharmacy and director of the institute for cerebrovascular diseases in Bucharest.

== Bibliography ==
- Kreindler, Arthur (1955). Epilepsia. Cercetări clinice și experimentale. București: Editura Academiei Republicii Populare Romîne.
