= 50 YouTubers Fight for $1,000,000 =

2024 YouTube video by MrBeast

- The video's original thumbnail on YouTube. Donaldson is pictured in the center with various other YouTubers. (Note: Top to bottom from left column: Fede Vigevani, CarryMinati, IShowSpeed, KSI, Pokimane, Logan Paul, Lexi Rivera, Mark Rober and Kai Cenat)
- Produced by: Jimmy Donaldson
- Starring: List of contestants
- Release date: July 13, 2024
- Running time: 41 minutes
- Country: United States
- Language: English

"50 YouTubers Fight for $1,000,000" is a YouTube video by American YouTuber Jimmy Donaldson, known on the platform as MrBeast. The video, described by Donaldson as his "biggest video ever," featured fifty YouTubers from around the world competing to stay inside a large glass cube for as long as possible while completing challenges. It received over 70 million views in 24 hours, making it his most-viewed video in that time frame.

== Background ==
Donaldson overtook T-Series as the most subscribed YouTube channel on June 2, 2024, and 38 days later his YouTube channel became the first to reach 300 million subscribers, gaining 28 million subscribers in June 2024. He described the video as the new "biggest video ever" with the previous holders including "$456,000 Squid Game in Real Life!" (2021), "100 Kids Vs 100 Adults for $500,000" (2022) and "Every Country On Earth Fights for $250,000!" (2023). MrBeast posted a picture of him with the YouTubers on June 5, 2024, on Twitter and also posted a list of the YouTubers featured in the video before deleting it. Included in the video were three creators from France, several Spanish-speaking YouTubers and CarryMinati from India.

== Production ==
MrBeast provided the YouTubers with business class flights and a layover to Raleigh–Durham International Airport which is about two hours from the filming location of Greenville, North Carolina. Each YouTuber received gifts such as AirPods Pros and chocolate as well as a shirt with their names on the front and their approximate subscribers on the back. The video was sponsored by Samsung with the Samsung Galaxy Ring being used to take YouTubers' heart rates and the Samsung Galaxy Z Flip 6 being used to monitor them in the fourth challenge.

== Synopsis ==
Mark Rober, JiDion, and Ryan Trahan were the first YouTubers to be eliminated after failing to make basketball shots to win a subscriber of theirs a Cybertruck. In the second challenge the YouTubers must cut dalgonas as seen in the Netflix show Squid Game. Challenge three was a game of Jenga. The fourth challenge was a "steal or no steal" briefcase challenge featuring the host of Deal or No Deal, Howie Mandel. The fifth challenge was to cook for judges Joey Chestnut, Miranda Cosgrove and IShowSpeed, the latter of whom was originally set to compete in the video. Logan Paul accidentally eliminated himself by leaving the cube to smash a plate during the challenge. The final challenge was about figuring out which of the five remaining contestants had the million dollar briefcase in a "game of bluff". YouTube animator Jaiden Animations won the cash prize in which she intends to use it to allow some of her subscribers to attend art school.

Contestants

Name	Country	Subscribers	Status
Jaiden Animations	United States	12 million	Winner
Alexandra Botez	United States/Canada	1 million (Note: Subscribers on shirt based on collective channel (BotezLive))	Runner-up
Amixem	France	8 million	Runner-up
Nick DiGiovanni	United States	16 million	Runner-up
Ludwig	United States	5 million	Eliminated (Challenge 6)
SpriteDer SPD	Thailand	14 million	Eliminated (Challenge 5)
Rubius	Spain	12 million (Note: Subscribers on shirt based on second channel (Rubius Z) rather than main channel (elrubiusOMG) which had 40 million subscribers)	Eliminated (Challenge 5)
Logan Paul	United States	23 million	Self-eliminated
Aj Shabeel	United Kingdom	1 million	Eliminated (Challenge 5)
Kai Cenat	United States	7 million	Eliminated (Challenge 5)
Marques Brownlee	United States	18 million	Eliminated (Challenge 4)
Valkyrae	United States	4 million	Eliminated (Challenge 4)
Sushi Ramen Riku	Japan	8 million	Eliminated (Challenge 4)
Niko Omilana	United Kingdom	7 million	Eliminated (Challenge 4)
Quackity	Mexico	6 million	Eliminated (Challenge 4)
LazarBeam	Australia	21 million	Eliminated (Challenge 4)
Sam	United States	12 million (Note: Subscribers on shirt based on collective channel (Sam and Colby) rather than individual channels (Sam Golbach and Colby Brock) which had 2 and 3 million subscribers, respectively)	Eliminated (Challenge 4)
Enaldinho	Brazil	36 million	Eliminated (Challenge 3)
CarryMinati	India	42 million	Eliminated (Challenge 3)
Ibai	Spain	11 million	Eliminated (Challenge 3)
Spreen	Argentina	7 million	Eliminated (Challenge 3)
Deestroying	Costa Rica/United States	5 million	Eliminated (Challenge 3)
Andrea Botez	Canada	1 million	Eliminated (Challenge 3)
Michelle Khare	United States	4 million	Eliminated (Challenge 3)
Jesser	United States	19 million	Eliminated (Challenge 3)
Amine	France	1 million	Eliminated (Challenge 3)
MoistCr1tikal	United States	15 million	Eliminated (Challenge 3)
Jacksfilms	United States	4 million	Eliminated (Challenge 3)
Kwaktube	South Korea	1 million	Eliminated (Challenge 3)
TheOdd1sOut	United States	19 million	Eliminated (Challenge 3)
Bella Poarch	United States	7 million	Eliminated (Challenge 3)
Vikkstar	United Kingdom	7 million	Eliminated (Challenge 3)
Chunkz	United Kingdom	3 million	Eliminated (Challenge 3)
KSI	United Kingdom	16 million (Note: Subscribers on shirt based on second channel (JJ Olatunji) rather than main channel (KSI) which had 23 million subscribers)	Eliminated (Challenge 3)
Sketch	United States	0.5 million (Note: Subscribers on shirt incorrectly stated that he had 5 million subscribers.)	Eliminated (Challenge 2)
Mastu	France	6 million	Eliminated (Challenge 2)
Pokimane	Canada/Morocco	6 million	Eliminated (Challenge 2)
jschlatt	United States	4 million	Eliminated (Challenge 2)
MatPat	United States	19 million	Eliminated (Challenge 2)
Lexi Rivera	United States	16 million	Eliminated (Challenge 2)
Ossy Marwah	Saudi Arabia	7 million	Eliminated (Challenge 2)
Fede Vigevani	Uruguay/Mexico	50 million	Eliminated (Challenge 2)
Michael Reeves	United States	7 million	Eliminated (Challenge 2)
FaZe Rug	United States	26 million	Eliminated (Challenge 2)
Colby	United States	12 million	Eliminated (Challenge 2)
LilyPichu	United States	3 million	Self-eliminated
Nil Ojeda	Spain	4 million	Self-eliminated
Ryan Trahan	United States	16 million	Eliminated (Challenge 1)
JiDion	United States	7 million	Eliminated (Challenge 1)
Mark Rober	United States	50 million	Eliminated (Challenge 1)

== Release and reception ==
The video was released on July 13, 2024, and is over 40 minutes long. The video became Donaldson's most viewed video in its first 24 hours with over 70 million views, 23 million shy of the 24-hour viewership record held by the Grand Theft Auto VI trailer in December 2023. Additionally, videos that YouTubers made about the MrBeast video became popular including videos by Logan Paul, Pokimane and FaZe Rug as well as a Jschlatt video recorded on an "old school" camera. Jaiden Animations began production of an animated video of her experience in the challenge on June 6, 2024, with the video being uploaded in August 2024. In response to allegations against MrBeast, Jaiden Animations added a disclaimer in the description stating that she was "Not associated with the production/ethics of any MrBeast videos" and was "Just here to tell my cube story and animation unfortunately takes a long time".

Joshua Cohen of Tubefilter described the "sheer amount of coordination and gravitational pull" that Donaldson had to get the creators to add the video to their production calendars as "incredibly impressive". Spanish streamer Ibai Llanos said that it was an experience that he would "obviously repeat" but that the Spanish-speaking YouTubers were not featured as much as their American counterparts due to them being "insignificant" in comparison to them. South Korean travel YouTuber Kwaktube told the Maeil Business Newspaper that he found it "hard to get to know each other".
