= Horiuchi =

Horiuchi (written: 堀内, lit. "within the moat") is a Japanese surname. Notable people with the surname include:

- Annick Horiuchi, French historian of mathematics
- Gen Horiuchi (堀内 元), Japanese ballet dancer and choreographer
- Glenn Horiuchi (1955–2000), American jazz pianist, composer, and shamisen player
- Hatsutarō Horiuchi (堀内 初太郎; 1909–1986), Japanese photographer
- Iwao Horiuchi (堀内 岩雄; born 1941), Japanese sport wrestler
- Ken Horiuchi (堀内 健; born 1969), Japanese comedian
- Kenyu Horiuchi (堀内 賢雄; born 1957), Japanese voice actor
- Lon Horiuchi (born 1954), American FBI sniper
- Masami Horiuchi (堀内 正美; born 1950), Japanese actor
- Mika Horiuchi (born 1986), American musician
- Mitsuo Horiuchi (堀内 光雄; born 1930), Japanese politician
- Noriko Horiuchi (ほりうち のりこ, born 1965), Japanese politician
- Paul Horiuchi (1906–1999), Japanese-American painter and collagist
- Shunsuke Horiuchi (堀内 俊介; born 1959), Japanese rower
- Takao Horiuchi (堀内 孝雄; born 1949), Japanese pop and enka singer
- Terufumi Horiuchi (堀内 照文), Japanese politician
- Toyoaki Horiuchi (堀内 豊秋; 1900–1948), Imperial Japanese Navy officer
- Tsuneo Horiuchi (堀内 恒夫; born 1948), Japanese baseball player
- Yu Horiuchi (堀内 優; born 1990), Japanese sport wrestler
- Riku Horiuchi (堀内 陸; born 1999), Japanese youtuber called Sushi Ramen Riku (Japanese: すしらーめん《りく》)

== See also ==
- Horinouchi (disambiguation)
