= Ruxandra Botez =

Romanian Canadian Aerospace Engineer and Professor

Ruxandra Mihaela Botez
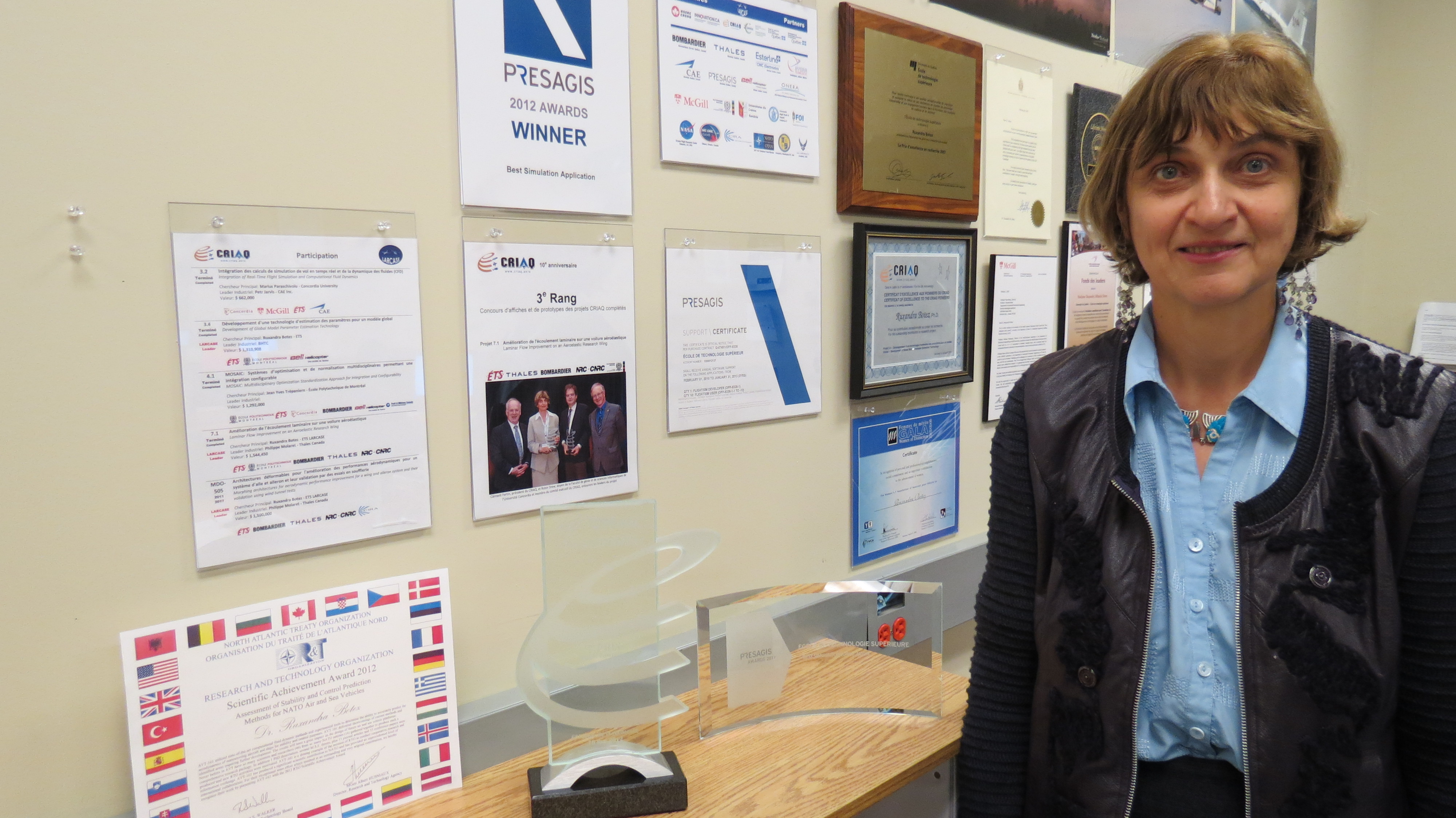
- Born: Bucharest, Romania
- Known for: Aircraft Design Modeling, Simulation and Control
- Scientific career
- Institutions: Industria Aeronautică Română; Bombardier Inc.; École de technologie supérieure

Notes
- Full Professor at École de technologie supérieure holding the Canada Research Chair

Ruxandra Mihaela Botez is an aerospace design engineer, specializing in aircraft modeling and simulation. She holds a Canada Research Chair in the Systems Engineering Department of the École de technologie supérieure [ETS] in Quebec.

== Education ==
Botez was born in Bucharest, Romania to Mihai Ioan Botez and Alexandrina Oprescu.

In 1984, she graduated from Politehnica University of Bucharest as an aerospace design engineer. She worked at the Industria Aeronautică Română (IAR) until 1987 when she emigrated to Canada, where she later received a Master's degree in aerospace engineering at the École Polytechnique de Montréal and a PhD in mechanical engineering at McGill University in 1994. Following this, she worked as a postdoctoral researcher until 1995 at Auburn University in the United States.

She worked at Bombardier Aviation before joining ETS as a professor in 1998.

== Research and teaching ==
In 2003, she founded the Laboratory of Applied Research in Active Controls, Avionics and AeroServoElasticity (LARCASE). She led three projects that were initiated and funded by the Consortium for Research and Innovation in Aerospace in Québec (CRIAQ), the Natural Sciences and Engineering Research Council, and industrial partners. These projects were realized with Bell Textron (on the Bell-427 helicopter Level D simulator certification) and with Bombardier Aviation and Thales (on morphing wings)

From 2009 to 2019, she worked in collaboration with CMC Electronics on projects on the conception of new methodologies for aircraft trajectory optimizations for fuel reduction applied to the Flight management system (FMS).

As of 2021, she is editor-in-chief of the bulletin of the Romanian National Institute for Aerospace Research (INCAS). Her published work focuses on wing and controller design.

== Recognition ==
Botez is a fellow of the Canadian Academy of Engineering.
