= Jaiden Animations =

American YouTuber and animator (born 1997)

- Dittfach's YouTube profile picture
- Born: Jaiden Dittfach; September 27, 1997 (age 29); United States
- Occupations: YouTuber; animator
- Years active: 2014–present

YouTube information
- Channel: JaidenAnimations
- Genres: Comedy; animation; storytelling; gaming; lifestyle
- Subscribers: 15.3 million
- Views: 3.22 billion
- Last updated: November 16, 2026
- Website: jaidenanimations.com

Jaiden Dittfach (born September 27, 1997) is an American YouTuber and animator known for her story-time animations channel, Jaiden Animations. She makes videos on a variety of topics, spanning from personal life experiences to video game stories. Her main channel was founded in 2014, and as of November 2026, has over 15.3 million subscribers and 3.22 billion views. Nominated for a total of six Streamy Awards, she won in the Animated category in 2020.

== Early life ==
Jaiden Dittfach was born on September 27, 1997, in the United States. Her parents are from Canada; her mother is of Japanese descent, and her father is white.

== Career ==
Dittfach created her YouTube channel in February 2014, when she was 16 years old. Prior to publishing her own videos, Dittfach did work for other YouTube channels, including creating animations for iHasCupquake. In 2016 and 2017, Dittfach's channel started trending on the website, becoming more prominent to bigger audiences. She uploads animated YouTube videos that tell stories about her personal life. Her videos have occasionally discussed subjects such as anxiety, her eating disorder, depression, and other more serious topics. She also creates videos centered on her travels and video games, such as Pokémon.

In December 2017, Dittfach's animated character appeared in YouTube Rewind: The Shape of 2017, the first YouTube Rewind installment to include YouTube animators. In 2018, her character again appeared in the following installment, Everyone Controls Rewind. Her appearance was positively received by viewers for including a reference to PewDiePie's chair; at the time, he was the most-subscribed YouTuber and was controversially excluded from the video. In September 2018, she also received a nomination in the Animated category for the 8th Streamy Awards.

In March 2019, Dittfach participated in an airsoft gun tournament organized by YouTuber MrBeast and sponsored by game developer Electronic Arts. The event, organized in order to promote the release of Apex Legends, featured 36 players, all of whom were prominent YouTube influencers. Dittfach's team, which also included TheOdd1sOut and Anthony Padilla, ended up winning $100,000 in one of two rounds of the competition, with Dittfach firing the winning shot. In December 2020, she won at the 10th Streamy Awards in the Animated category.

In January 2021, Dittfach appeared on YIAY Time: The Game Show, a YouTube Original comedy program hosted by YouTuber jacksfilms. She also frequently appears on the improv game show Scribble Showdown with TheOdd1sOut, Domics, RubberRoss, Egoraptor, and Emirichu. With fellow YouTuber TheOdd1sOut, Dittfach is a part of the "Animation Squad", a group of animators who frequently create videos together. Her channel is managed by the Channel Frederator Network.

On June 1, 2021, her YouTube channel reached 10 million subscribers. She received a nomination in the Animated category for the 11th Streamy Awards in December 2021. In 2022, she signed with the Creative Artists Agency. YouTube ranked her video "Being Not Straight", among their list of the "top trending videos" of 2022, as it reached over 17 million views by the end of the year.

In July 2024, she won another competition organized by MrBeast, this time in the video "50 YouTubers Fight for $1,000,000" in which she competed against 49 other YouTubers for $1,000,000 to give away to their subscribers. She and the other four finalists agreed that whomever won would give $100,000 each to the other four who didn't win, although Amixem had decided to let her keep her share, leaving Dittfach with $700,000. She pledged to use the prize money to send some of her subscribers to art school. Later that month, for the tenth anniversary of her first video upload, Dittfach announced that she does not plan to continue creating content indefinitely.

== Charitable activities ==
In April 2019, Dittfach published a video encouraging people to donate to 'Bird Gardens of Naples', a non-profit bird sanctuary in Florida, via a GoFundMe campaign. Within nine weeks, the campaign had raised over $22,000. Dittfach was also among many social media figures who donated to the Team Trees fundraiser in 2019. For World Health Day in April 2020, she participated in #HopeFromHome, a charity livestream initiated by fellow YouTuber Jacksepticeye that raised over $260,000 for COVID-19 relief.

In October 2021, Dittfach participated in a charity tournament for the video game Nickelodeon All-Star Brawl hosted by YouTuber Alpharad and Coney of the esports organization Panda Global, playing as the character CatDog. In her campaign, she raised over $73,000 after uploading a now-deleted video asking for donations to help choose CatDog as the character she wished to play for the tournament.

== Personal life ==
In 2017, Dittfach spoke out about her experience with eating disorders, specifically anorexia and bulimia in a video titled "Why I Don't Have a 'Face Reveal'", as well as a song titled "Empty" in 2018, recorded together with Boyinaband.

Having previously lived in Arizona, Dittfach stated in a video in September 2018 that she had moved to California. Around December 2022, she moved with YouTuber Jacob "Alpharad" Rabon to the neighborhood of Sherman Oaks in Los Angeles, California. In February 2026, Rabon stated that the two had moved to the Pacific Northwest.

In March 2022, in her video titled "Being Not Straight", she publicly came out as aromantic and asexual. In 2024, she announced that she was diagnosed with autism and ADHD.

She is a vegetarian, and previously was a vegan.

== Filmography ==
Year	Title	Role	Notes	Ref.
2017–2018	YouTube Rewind	Herself	Web series; voice; also animator; 2 episodes	
2020	The Creator Games	Herself (contestant)	Web special	
2021	YIAY Time: The Game Show	Herself (contestant)	Web special	
2024	50 YouTubers Fight for $1,000,000	Herself (contestant)	Web special	
2024	AFK Journey	Jaiden	Video game; voice	
2025	Spike & Mike's Animation Extravaganza	Herself (co-host)	Web special	

== Discography ==
- 2018: "Empty" (with Boyinaband)
- 2021: "Rise Above" (as publisher; with Rainych)
- 2022: "Rise Above (English Version)" (as publisher; with Rainych and Illberg)
- 2022: "Rise Above (Japanese Version)" (as publisher; with Rainych and Illberg)

== Awards and nominations ==
Year	Award	Category	Result	Ref(s).
2018	Streamy Awards	Overall Award – Animated	Nominated	
2020	Streamy Awards	Subject Award – Animated	Won	
2021	Streamy Awards	Subject Award – Animated	Nominated	
2022	Streamy Awards	Subject Award – Animated	Nominated	
2023	Streamy Awards	Subject Award – Animated	Nominated	
2023	Streamy Awards	Individual Award – VTuber	Nominated	
