= CodeMiko =

Korean-American streamer and YouTuber (born 1990)

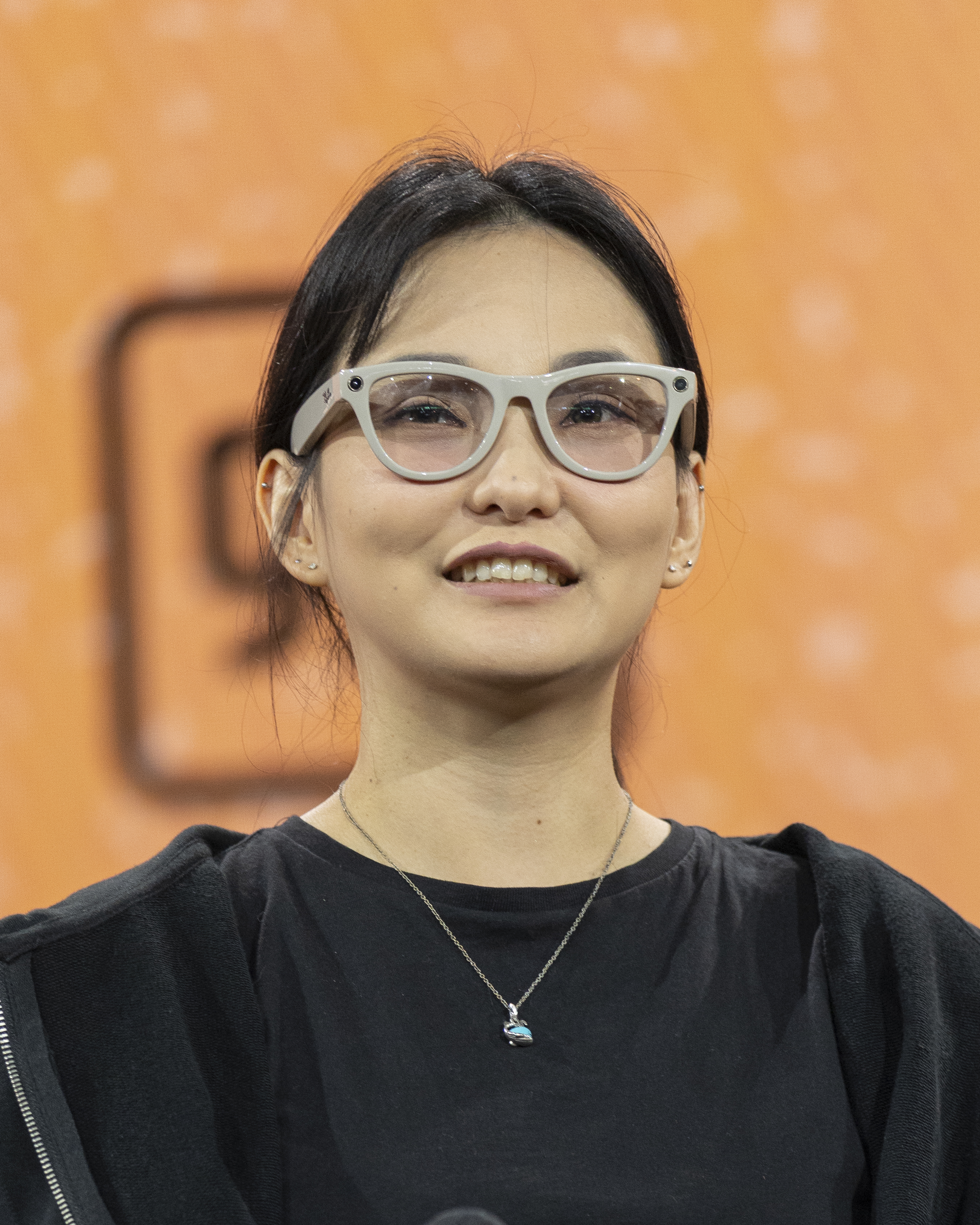
- Kang in 2026
- Born: Youna Kang; 27 February 1990 (age 36); South Korea
- Other names: Miko; Technician; Youneh
- Occupations: Twitch streamer; YouTuber; Virtual YouTuber
- Organization: Team Envy

Twitch information
- Channel: CodeMiko
- Years active: 2017–present
- Genres: Chatting; Gaming
- Games: Among Us; Chess; Grand Theft Auto V
- Followers: 915 thousand

YouTube information
- Channel: CodeMiko
- Years active: 2020–present
- Genres: Chatting; Gaming
- Subscribers: 677 thousand
- Views: 215.36 million
- Last updated: 14 October 2024

Youna Kang (born 27 February 1990), better known by her online 3D Virtual YouTuber persona CodeMiko and alias The Technician, is a South Korean-American Twitch streamer and YouTuber. Kang is best known for her live streams on Twitch, for interviewing other streamers, content creators, and internet personalities as her alter ego persona CodeMiko, and for pushing the envelope with regard to interactivity in VTuber technology.

Kang created the CodeMiko persona using Unreal Engine, a motion capture suit from Xsens, motion capture gloves from Manus VR, and a facial tracking helmet from MOCAP Design. (Note: The face tracking helmet utilizes an IPhone X for its depth camera) (Note: The motion capture and facial tracking data is fed into Unreal Engine using the LiveLinkPlugin) The CodeMiko avatar is composed of 36,000 polygons, modeled in Autodesk Maya, and textured using Adobe Substance. While Kang originally created CodeMiko alone, the project is now being developed by a team consisting of an engineer, an artist / animator / rigger, a publicist, a personal assistant, and a manager.

Kang now focuses on leading the development effort on broadcasting and idea generation. Kang is focused not just on broadcasting but rather on introducing new standards of interactivity with her audience. CodeMiko's virtual environment is designed to be quasi-interactive, meaning that viewers can influence and modify the CodeMiko avatar and surroundings by engaging in live stream chat or by donating money.

== Career ==
Kang came up with the idea of CodeMiko while working at Nickelodeon. After being laid off due to the COVID-19 pandemic, she decided to pursue streaming full-time. Early on, she made around $300 per month from Twitch, which could not cover rent. This move was quite risky considering that Kang went into debt to acquire the Xsens Mo-cap suit, in total, she accumulated over $20,000 in debt in order to get the setup she needed. She has attributed her success to this debt and her poor risk management. Kang states that, since CodeMiko project has been a success, she can now afford a comfortable living.

=== Streaming ===
Kang had her streaming breakthrough in 2021. She has attributed her sudden rise in popularity due to having a viral tweet on Twitter and going viral on r/LiveStreamFails on Reddit.

==== CodeMiko ====
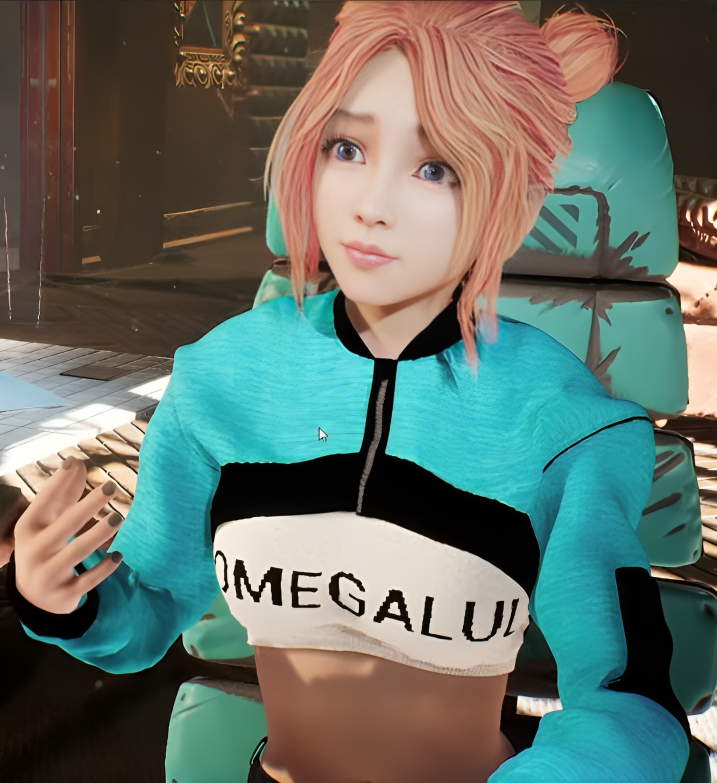
CodeMiko, Kang's Virtual YouTuber persona, during a livestream in 2021

The CodeMiko avatar's in-universe backstory is that she is a video game character without a game. She had always wanted to be in a mainstream video game but never succeeded in doing so due to her 'Glitch' (a story arc very similar to Vanellope von Schweetz from the Wreck-It Ralph franchise). CodeMiko has expressed that she was forced to take smaller roles, such as a bush in The Last of Us, following the archetypical story of the struggling Hollywood actress, someone who just wants to be in a movie, any movie, but for Miko, any video game. She finally managed to find her way into Kang / The Technicians Unreal Engine project, thus becoming a Twitch streamer. She is currently roaming different game worlds, looking for a place she will fit in. So far, she has visited the world of dead memes and The Sims.

The CodeMiko avatar is aware of the Technician and frequently breaks the Fourth Wall, both indirectly through cross-over interviews such as CodeMiko interviewing the Technician, and directly through the use of augmented reality.

The "glitchiness" of the CodeMiko character is expressed and explored through her sometimes glitching into her evil alter ego avatar, simply known as "Glitch", exchanging her usual pink-haired avatar for a semi-transparent Matrix digital rain-inspired avatar. The "Glitch" avatar is additionally distinguished by having a deeper and hoarser voice achieved through the use of a voice changer. Glitch is very profane and seeks to offend.

It was assumed that CodeMiko was originally released and developed under the name 'mikoglitch', only to be dropped as it conflicted with 'Miko Kubota' of Glitch Techs - but in a VOD, Youna said, "this is not true" and explained how she created "mikoglitch" to bypass the temporary shadow ban on her "CodeMiko" channel.

The interview show has been compared to the 1990s animated parody talk show Space Ghost Coast to Coast. On CodeMiko, Kang said, "She's kind of stupid, unfiltered, and not afraid to say whatever is on her mind or what she sees."

==== PogChamps ====
CodeMiko participated in the online amateur chess tournament PogChamps 3 in 2021. She placed last with 4 losses and 0 wins, along with streamer Myth. She was coached by PogChamps coaches, WGM Anna Rudolf and Andrea Botez.

==== TOS PTSD ====
Kang has described having developed "TOS PTSD" following her unintentionally breaking Twitch's terms of service (TOS) and subsequent receiving bans, leading to her developing economic anxiety and seeking help from psychiatrist and Twitch streamer Alok Kanojia on stream.

Kang has expressed worries about Twitch's introduction of a "Brand Safety Score" system, with regard to how her X-rated jokes and humor may not be advertiser-friendly content and thus may threaten her income potential on the platform. She has since described how her worries lessened as she came to be sponsored by several brands.

== Reception ==
The CodeMiko project has generally been positively received, with Kotaku describing CodeMiko as "The Future Of Streaming" and Designboom stating that she is "Revolutionizing the digital space". The Financial Times have reported that her content might be signalling "The next frontier of digital entertainment", while Quartz has reported CodeMiko as "The talk show host of the future". The Verge has reported CodeMiko as someone who is "reshaping the Twitch landscape in her image".

The project has also received interest from several producers of sexually explicit content.

== Awards and nominations ==
Ceremony	Year	Category	Result	Ref.
SIGGRAPH Asia Award Winners	2021	Best in Show	Won	
Streamy Awards	2022	Best VTuber	Won	
The Streamer Awards	2021	Best VTuber Streamer	Won	
The Streamer Awards	2023	Best Software and Game Development Streamer	Nominated	
The Vtuber Awards	2023	Best Tech VTuber	Nominated	

== See also ==
- Ami Yamato — Japanese virtual YouTube vlogger
- Kizuna AI — one of the largest and earliest VTubers
- Projekt Melody — fellow VTuber, who also has a glitchy alter ego - Melware.
