= Andrea Botez =

American-Canadian chess player (born 2002)

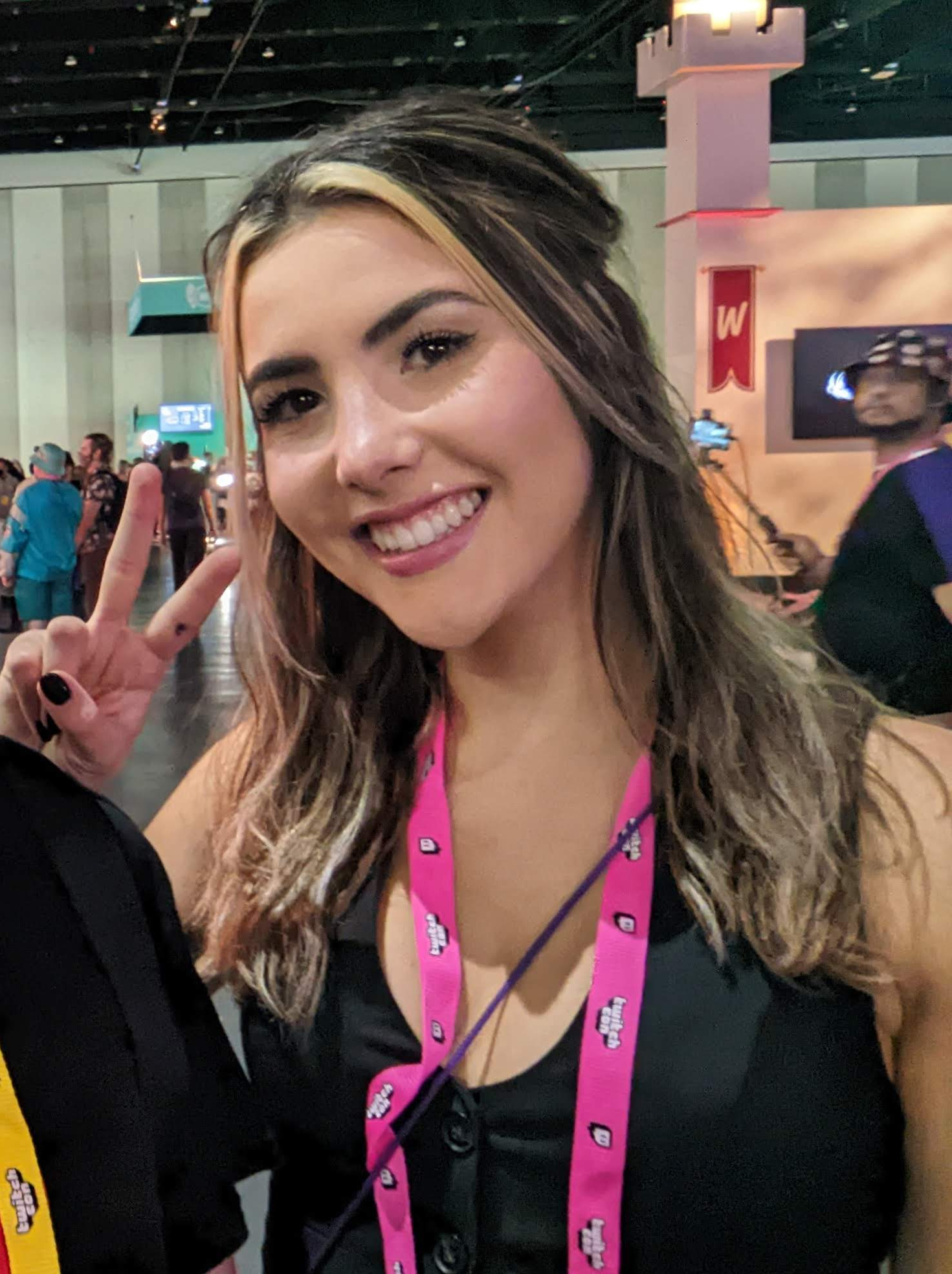
- Botez in 2022

Personal information
- Born: April 6, 2002 (age 24) Vancouver, British Columbia, Canada

Chess career
- Country: Canada
- FIDE rating: 1837 (March 2025)
- Peak rating: 1906 (June 2024)

Andrea Cecilia Cristina Botez (/ˈboʊtɛz/ BOH-tez; born April 6, 2002) is a Canadian chess player, online streamer, DJ and electronic music producer. With her older sister Alexandra Botez, she co-hosts the chess and entertainment channel BotezLive, which became prominent during the growth of online chess streaming in the early 2020s. The sisters were named to the Forbes 30 Under 30 Games list in 2023 and were ranked fourth on Rolling Stone's list of the 20 most influential creators that year.

Botez began performing as a DJ in 2023 and subsequently moved electronic music production, releasing techno and other electronic music.

== Early life and background ==
Botez's Romanian parents moved to Canada after Alexandra Botez, Andrea's older sister, was born in Dallas, Texas, United States. The family relocated to Vancouver, British Columbia, before moving to Oregon, United States when Alexandra was in high school.

== Chess career ==
Botez began playing chess at the age of six. She started playing in the US Chess tournaments at the age of seven. In 2010, she won the U8 Girls Canadian Youth Chess Championship.

In 2015, at the age of thirteen, she became the Women British Columbia Chess Champion. In the same year, Botez also won the Susan Polgar National Open.

In 2016, at the SPFNO 2016: U14 Girls, Botez placed fourth in the tournament and 13th in the 2016 Susan Polgar Foundation Girls' Invitational.

Botez attained her highest FIDE classical rating of 1906 in 2024 and her highest US Chess rating of 1933 in 2019. As of January 27, 2025, her rating is 1837 which ranks her 63,202nd in the world among all active players.

== Content creation ==
Alongside her sister, Botez runs the Twitch channel BotezLive, which, as of May 2022, has 1.1 million followers with more than 18.3 million views. She began assisting her sister in 2020 by playing chess and in other variety streams and the YouTube channel BotezLive, which, as of May 2022, has over 800k subscribers and 140 million views. She took a gap year to focus on streaming, before becoming a full-time streamer.

She is credited, along with her older sister Alexandra Botez, Hikaru Nakamura, GothamChess, and more, for popularizing chess on Twitch.

On December 21, 2020, Andrea and Alexandra signed a contract with Envy Gaming as content creators at the launch of the organization's creator network and ambassador program. They would later move to Los Angeles, California, where they would join other content creators such as JustaMinx and CodeMiko in the Envy Content House.

In 2020, Botez participated in the Zoomers Play Chess team match to help raise funds for children in need affected by the COVID-19 pandemic.

On July 20, 2022, Andrea and Alexandra signed with Creative Artists Agency. The agency will work with them on the development of original content, new IP ventures, and “strategic growth across platforms and talent”.

In August 2022, it was announced that Andrea and Alexandra had joined OpTic Gaming after Envy Gaming announced the retirement of their Envy brand.

In 2023, Andrea and Alexandra were named to Forbes' 30 Under 30 list in the games category. Later in April 2023, they appeared on Rolling Stone's list of the 20 Most Influential Creators in 2023. On July 13, 2024, she appeared in a MrBeast video titled "50 YouTubers Fight for $1,000,000".

=== Botez Abroad ===
Aside from their regular chess streams and other activities, the two sisters host a show on their Twitch channel called Botez Abroad, a Twitch Original travel show where they travel to cities around the world and stream their in-person chess matches at various venues. The show has generated more than 20 million views and reached peak livestream viewership of 36,000 people.

=== PogChamps ===
In the second iteration of the online amateur chess tournament PogChamps, Botez was part of the commentator team. In 2021, Botez took part again in the PogChamps 3 tournament, doubling as a coach for CodeMiko and as a commentator, and, once again, she joined the commentator team for PogChamps 4.

== Music ==
Botez began performing as a DJ in 2023, making her debut at an event in Los Angeles. She later moved into electronic music production, working frequently with Swedish producer biskuwi. In 2024, they released several tracks together, including "Dune", "Queen's Gambit" and "Insomnia", followed by "S.O.S" on Monstercat in November.

Her music activity expanded in 2025. She collaborated with Canadian producer Whipped Cream on "Erased" and produced remixes for artists including Boris Brejcha and Kaskade. Botez continued releasing techno and other electronic music during 2025 and 2026 through Monstercat and independently.

== Boxing career ==
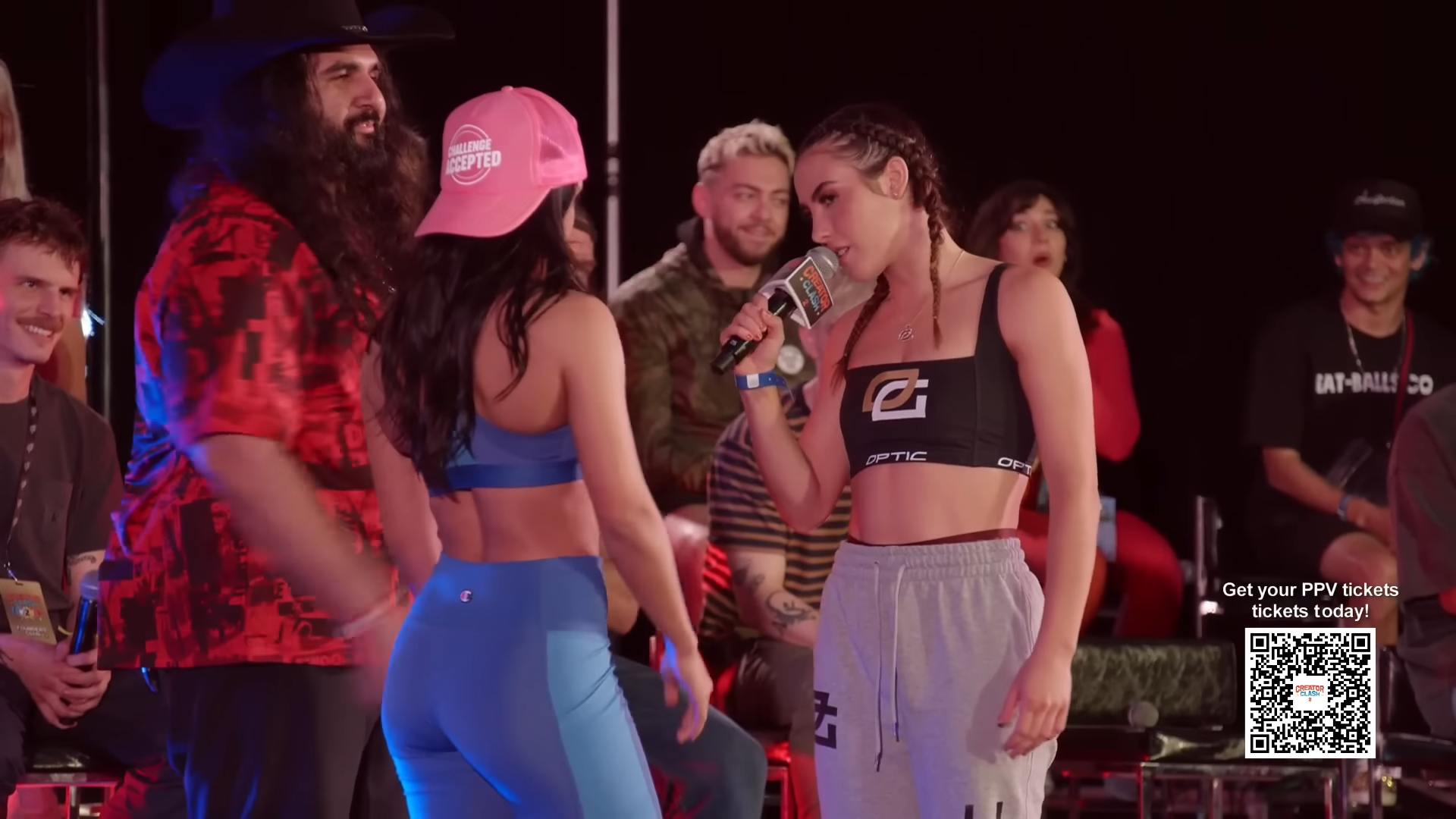
Botez during Creator Clash 2 weigh-ins

=== Mogul Chessboxing Championship ===
In December 2022, Botez competed against WGM (Woman Grandmaster) Dina Belenkaya in the Mogul Chessboxing Championship; hosted by Ludwig Ahgren. Initially, Belenkaya was deemed the winner, but after a post-fight review, the organizer announced an updated result: "...[Botez] should have been awarded a TKO after the referee initiated the fourth standing count of the fight". The update resulted in both Belenkaya and Botez being winners.

=== Creator Clash 2 ===
In April 2023, Botez lost a boxing match against fellow YouTuber Michelle Khare in Creator Clash 2, a charity boxing event held by YouTuber iDubbbz.

== Personal life ==
In 2020, Botez and her sister Alexandra Botez lived in New York. In 2022, they moved and now reside in Los Angeles, California.

In December 2023, Botez revealed during a livestream that she has been diagnosed with ADHD.

== Boxing record ==
=== Exhibition ===
1 fight	0 wins	1 loss
By knockout	0	0
By decision	0	1

No.	Result	Record	Opponent	Type	Round, time	Date	Location	Notes
1	Loss	0–1	Michelle Khare	UD	5	Apr 15, 2023	Amalie Arena, Tampa, Florida, U.S.	

=== Chessboxing ===
Chess boxing record
1 Fights, 1 Win (0 KOs, 1 TKO, 0 CMs)
Date	Result	Opponent	Event	Location	Method	Round	Time
2022-12-11	Draw	Dina Belenkaya	Mogul Chessboxing Championship	Galen Center, Los Angeles, California, U.S.	Win	7	
Legend: Win Loss Draw/No contest Notes

== Discography ==
=== Singles ===
Title	Year	Album
"Dune" (with biskuwi)	2024	Non-album singles
"Queen's Gambit" (with biskuwi)	2024	Non-album singles
"Voicemail" (with biskuwi)	2024	Non-album singles
"Insomnia" (with biskuwi)	2024	Non-album singles
"S.O.S" (with biskuwi)	2024	Non-album singles
"Erased" (with WHIPPED CREAM)	2025	Non-album singles
"Going Under" (with biskuwi featuring Sarah de Warren)	2025	Non-album singles
"If Only" (with Elliot Moss)	2025	Non-album singles
"Reaper" (with Naeleck)	2025	Non-album singles

=== Remixes ===
2025

- Boris Brejcha – "Kick It (Andrea Botez Remix)"
- Kaskade & Punctual – "Heaven Knows (featuring Poppy Baskcomb)" (Andrea Botez & biskuwi Remix)
- Will Smith - "Pretty Girls (featuring OBanga)" (Andrea Botez Remix)

== Awards and nominations ==
Ceremony	Year	Category	Result	Ref.
The Streamer Awards	2021	Best Chess Streamer	Won	
The Streamer Awards	2022	Best Chess Streamer	Nominated	
The Streamer Awards	2023	Best Chess Streamer	Nominated	
The Streamer Awards	2023	Best Shared Channel	Nominated	

=== Listicles ===
Publisher	Year	Listicle	Result	Ref.
Forbes	2023	30 Under 30: Games	Placed	
Rolling Stone	2023	20 Most Influential Creators	4th	
