= Mogul Chessboxing Championship =

American sporting event

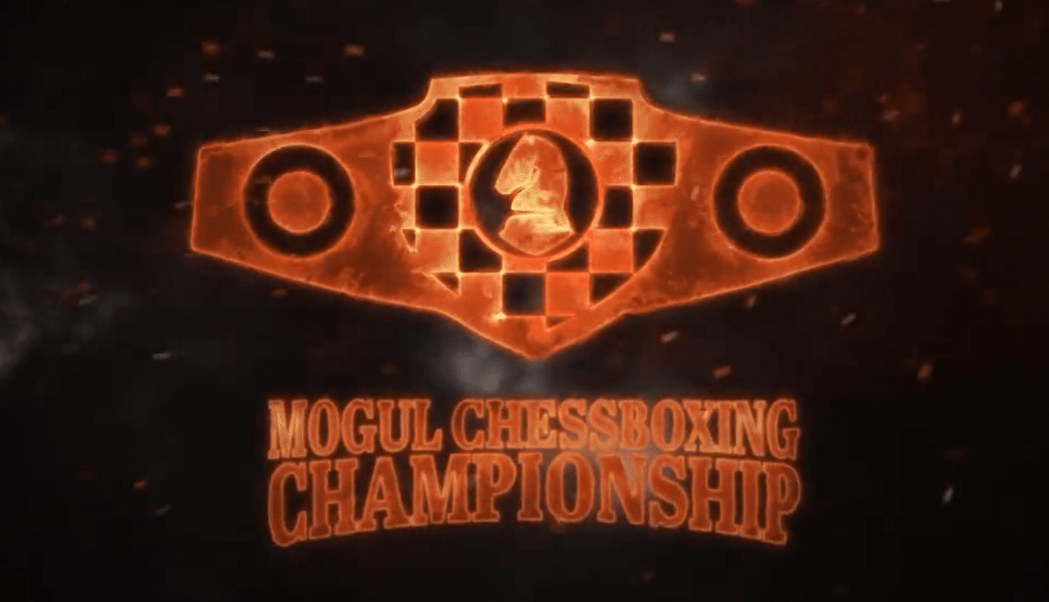
- Mogul Chessboxing Championship Logo
- Genre: Sports
- Venue: Galen Center
- Locations: Los Angeles, California
- Country: United States of America
- Inaugurated: December 11, 2022
- Attendance: 10,000
- Organizer: Mogul Moves; JK Productions

The Mogul Chessboxing Championship was a hybrid sporting event where YouTube, Twitch and other internet personalities compete in alternating rounds of boxing and chess in accordance with the rules of chess boxing. Mogul Chessboxing Championship gets its name from its founder Ludwig Ahgren, whose company operates under the name Mogul Moves. The event took place on December 11, 2022. at the Galen Center in Los Angeles.

The event broke the record for most viewed Chessboxing event of all time at over 558,000 viewers. After the first 24 hours, the VOD replay on YouTube had amassed 2.8 million views.

Approximately 10,000 fans were in attendance on the campus of University of Southern California.

A 2023 edition of the event was scheduled to take place in late 2023, but a date was never officially announced. On September 27, 2023, Ludwig announced on Twitter that the event would not be taking place in part due to sanctioning issues with the state of Nevada.

== Cards ==
There were two formats for the event, Smashboxing and Chessboxing. Smashboxing consisted of a round of Super Smash Bros. Melee, followed by 90 seconds of boxing. Chessboxing consisted of two minutes of Chess, followed 90 seconds of boxing. Both would go to a maximum of seven rounds

=== Smashboxing ===
==== Card 1 ====
Fighter	Height	Weight	Reach	Age	Smash Character
(New Zealand) Spud	6'1	157	72"	24	Marth
(United States) 2Saint	6'2	168	77"	24	Jigglypuff

==== Card 2 ====
Fighter	Height	Weight	Reach	Age	Smash Character
(United States) KJH	6'0	168	74"	29	Fox
(United States) Fiction	5'10	168	73"	29	Falco

=== Chessboxing ===
==== Card 3 ====
Fighter	Height	Weight	Reach	Age
(United States) boxbox	6'2	194	75"	26
(United States) Stanz	6'1	195	75"	30

==== Card 4 ====
Fighter	Height	Weight	Reach	Age
(United States) Overtflow	5'11	185	73"	31
(England) Chris Broad	5'8	180	69"	32

==== Card 5 ====
Fighter	Height	Weight	Reach	Age
(Singapore) Toph	5'9	163	72"	33
(United States) HugS	5'7	165	69"	36

==== Card 6 ====
Fighter	Height	Weight	Reach	Age
(Canada) Aman Hambleton	6'0	183	74"	29
(England) Lawrence Trent	5'11	197	72"	36

==== Card 7 ====
Fighter	Height	Weight	Reach	Age
(Canada) Andrea Botez	5'6	135	65"	20
(Russia) Dina Belenkaya	5'6	125	66"	28

==== Card 8 ====
Fighter	Height	Weight	Reach	Age
(United States) Cherdleys	5'9	165	71"	30
(United States) Myth	5'11	177	76"	23

==== Card 9 ====
Fighter	Height	Weight	Reach	Age
(Taiwan) DisguisedToast	5'7	141	69"	31
(United States) PointCrow	5'9	150	70"	24

== Matches ==
=== Smashboxing ===
Card	Winner		Runner-up	Method	Round
1	(United States) 2Saint	def.	(New Zealand) Spud	TKO (Boxing)	2
2	(United States) Fiction	def.	(United States) KJH	3-0 Smash wins (Smash Bros.)	5

=== Chessboxing ===
Card	Winner		Runner-up	Method	Round
3	(United States) boxbox	def.	(United States) Stanz	TKO (Boxing)	4
4	(England) Chris Broad	def.	(United States) Overtflow	Time (Chess)	7
5	(United States) HugS	def.	(Singapore) Toph	TKO (Boxing)	2
6	(Canada) Aman Hambleton	def.	(England) Lawrence Trent	TKO (Boxing)	2
7	(Russia) Dina Belenkaya	def.	(Canada) Andrea Botez	Time (Chess)	7
8	(United States) Myth	def.	(United States) Cherdleys	Time (Chess)	7
9	(Taiwan) DisguisedToast	def.	(United States) PointCrow	Checkmate (Chess)	7
