= Horinouchi =

Horinouchi may refer to:

- Horinouchi, Niigata, a former town in Kitauonuma District, Niigata Prefecture, Japan
- Horinouchi Station, a railway station in Yokosuka, Kanagawa Prefecture, Japan

== People with the surname ==
- Kensuke Horinouchi (堀内 謙介), Japanese diplomat

== See also ==
- Horiuchi, a Japanese surname
