= Walking Troubles of Organic Hemiplegy =

1898 documentary film by Gheorghe Marinescu

- Directed by: Gheorghe Marinescu
- Release date: 1898
- Running time: 2 minutes

Walking Troubles of Organic Hemiplegy (1898) is the first documentary film in the world, created by Romanian neurologist Gheorghe Marinescu. The film depicts several patients walking in four directions against a black background before and after treatment.

Marinescu came to the idea of making the film after having used chronophotography under the influence of Étienne-Jules Marey. Marinescu praised the use of the cinematographic techniques in the scientific investigation.

== Other documentary films ==
- A Case of Hysterical Hemiplegia Cured Through Hypnotic Suggestion (1899)
- Walking Difficulties Due to Progressive Locomotary Ataxia (1900)
- Pseudo-Hypertrophic or Myosclerotic Paralysis Among Myopathies (1901)
