= Gheorghe Marinescu =

Romanian neurologist (1863–1938)

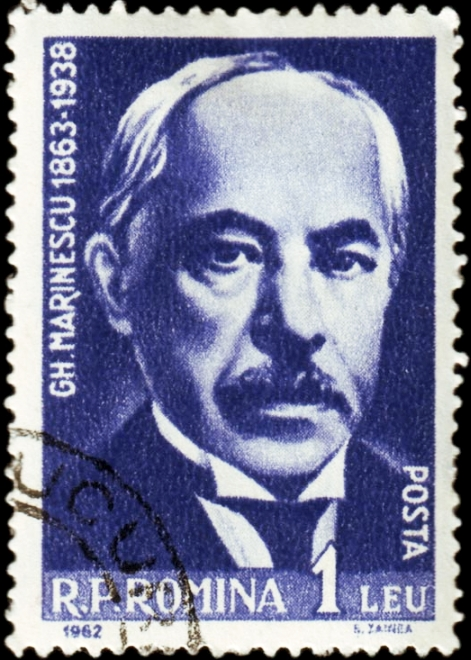
- Gheorghe Marinescu on a 1962 Romanian post stamp
- Born: 28 February 1863; Bucharest, United Principalities
- Died: 15 May 1938 (aged 75); Bucharest, Kingdom of Romania
- Other name: George/Georges Marinesco
- Education: University of Bucharest
- Known for: Romanian School of Neurology
- Scientific career
- Fields: Neurology

Gheorghe Marinescu (Romanian: [ˈɡe̯orɡe mariˈnesku]; 28 February 1863 – 15 May 1938) was a Romanian neurologist, founder of the Romanian School of Neurology.

== History ==
After attending the Faculty of Medicine of the University of Bucharest, Marinescu received most of his medical education as preparator at the laboratory of histology at the Brâncoveanu Hospital and as assistant at the Bacteriological Institute under Victor Babeș, who had already published several works on myelitis transversa, hysterical muteness, and dilatation of the pupil in pneumonia.

== Career ==
After qualification, and on the recommendation of Babeş, the government awarded Marinescu a grant to undertake postgraduate training in neurology under Jean-Martin Charcot at the Salpêtrière Hospital in Paris, where he met Pierre Marie, Joseph Babinski, and Fulgence Raymond. Later, he worked with Carl Weigert in Frankfurt and then with Emil du Bois-Reymond in Berlin. On the assignment of Pierre Marie, he lectured on the pathological anatomy of acromegaly at the Berlin International Congress in 1890.

After nine years abroad, Marinescu returned in 1897 to Bucharest, where he received his doctorate and began a new professorial department at Pantelimon Hospital which had been created for him. Shortly thereafter, in 1897, a chair of Clinical Neurology was created at the University of Bucharest, in Colentina Hospital. He remained in this post for the next 41 years and is regarded as the founder of the Romanian School of Neurology. He was elected a titular member of the Romanian Academy in 1905.

Between July 1898 and 1901, Marinescu made the first science films in the world in his clinic in Bucharest: The walking troubles of organic hemiplegy (1898), The walking troubles of organic paraplegies (1899), A case of hysteric hemiplegy healed through hypnosis (1899), The walking troubles of progressive locomotion ataxy (1900) and Illnesses of the muscles (1901). All these short subjects have been preserved. The professor called his works "studies with the help of the cinematograph", and published the results, along with several consecutive frames, in issues of the magazine La Semaine Médicale from Paris, between 1899 and 1902. In 1924, Auguste Lumière recognized the priority of professor Marinescu concerning the first science films: "I've seen your scientific reports about the usage of cinematograph in studies of nervous illnesses, when I was still receiving La Semaine Médicale, but back then I had other concerns, which left me no spare time to begin biological studies. I must say I forgot those works and I am thankful to you that you reminded them to me. Unfortunately, not many scientists have followed your way." In 1935, he became the founding chairman of the Royal Romanian Society for Heredity and Eugenics, which sought to popularize eugenics and promote forced sterilization.

== Legacy ==
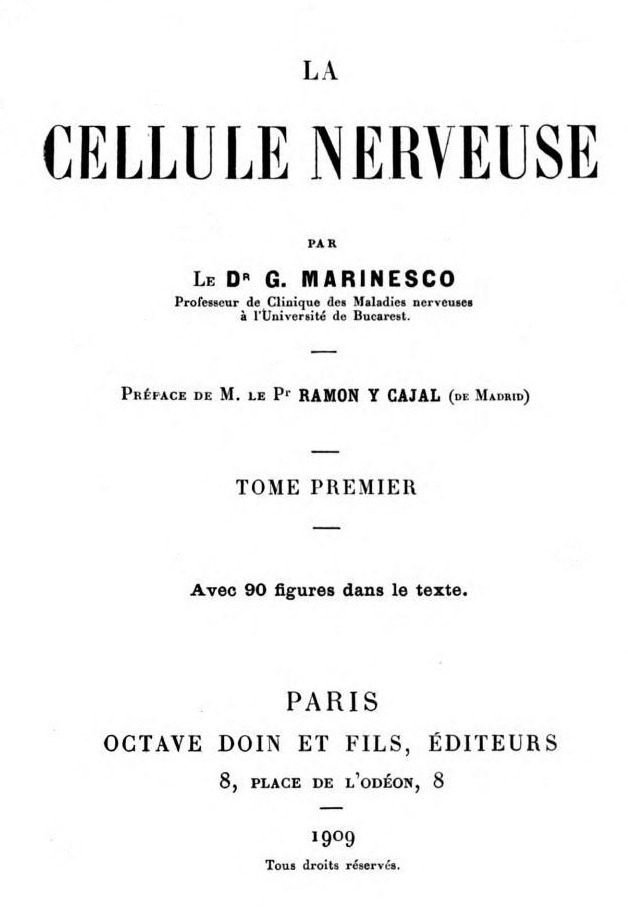
Flyleaf of La Cellule Nerveuse by G. Marinesco (1909)

Marinescu maintained close academic links with his Parisian colleagues and many of his articles, which exceeded 250 in number, were published in French. He had a wide range of research interests, including pathological anatomy and experimental neuropathology. Daily contact with scores of the infirm and his astuteness made him use the latest methods as they became available, such as the X-ray, with which he investigated bone changes in acromegaly, and the film camera, for the study of body movements in health and disease. The results of these studies appeared in the monograph Le Tonus des Muscles striés (1937) with Nicolae Ionescu-Siseşti, Oskar Sager and Arthur Kreindler, with a preface by Sir Charles Scott Sherrington.

Early in his career, Marinescu published a much needed atlas on the pathological histology of the nervous system with the bacteriologist Victor Babeş and the French pathologist Paul Oscar Blocq. His description with Blocq, of a case of Parkinsonian tremor due to tumour in the substantia nigra in 1893, was the basis for Édouard Brissaud's theory that Parkinsonism occurs as a consequence of damage to the substantia nigra. With Blocq he was the first to describe senile plaques and with Romanian neurologist Ion Minea he confirmed in 1913 Hideyo Noguchi's discovery of Treponema pallidum in the brain in patients with general paresis. His monumental work La Cellule Nerveuse, with a preface by Santiago Ramon y Cajal, appeared in 1909.

Marinescu was an eminent teacher. In his lectures he emphasised ideas and gave perspective for further investigations. Recognition in the form of honours came to him from many countries. It was he above all others who was chosen to represent the students of Charcot when the centenary of the great master was celebrated in 1925.

== Associated eponyms ==
- Marinescu's hand, a cold blue oedematous hand with lividity of the skin seen in neurological lesions such as syringomyelia.
- Marinesco–Sjögren syndrome, a rare congenital disorder with spinocerebellar ataxia, congenital cataract, short stature, intellectual disability, and some skeletal deformity.
- Palmomental reflex (Marinesco–Radovici sign, or Kinn reflex, or Marinesco reflex), a primitive reflex in some patients with pyramidal lesions.

== See also ==
- Walking Troubles of Organic Hemiplegy, 1898 documentary film (the first filmed documentary)
