= Alpharad =

American YouTuber and esports personality (born 1995)

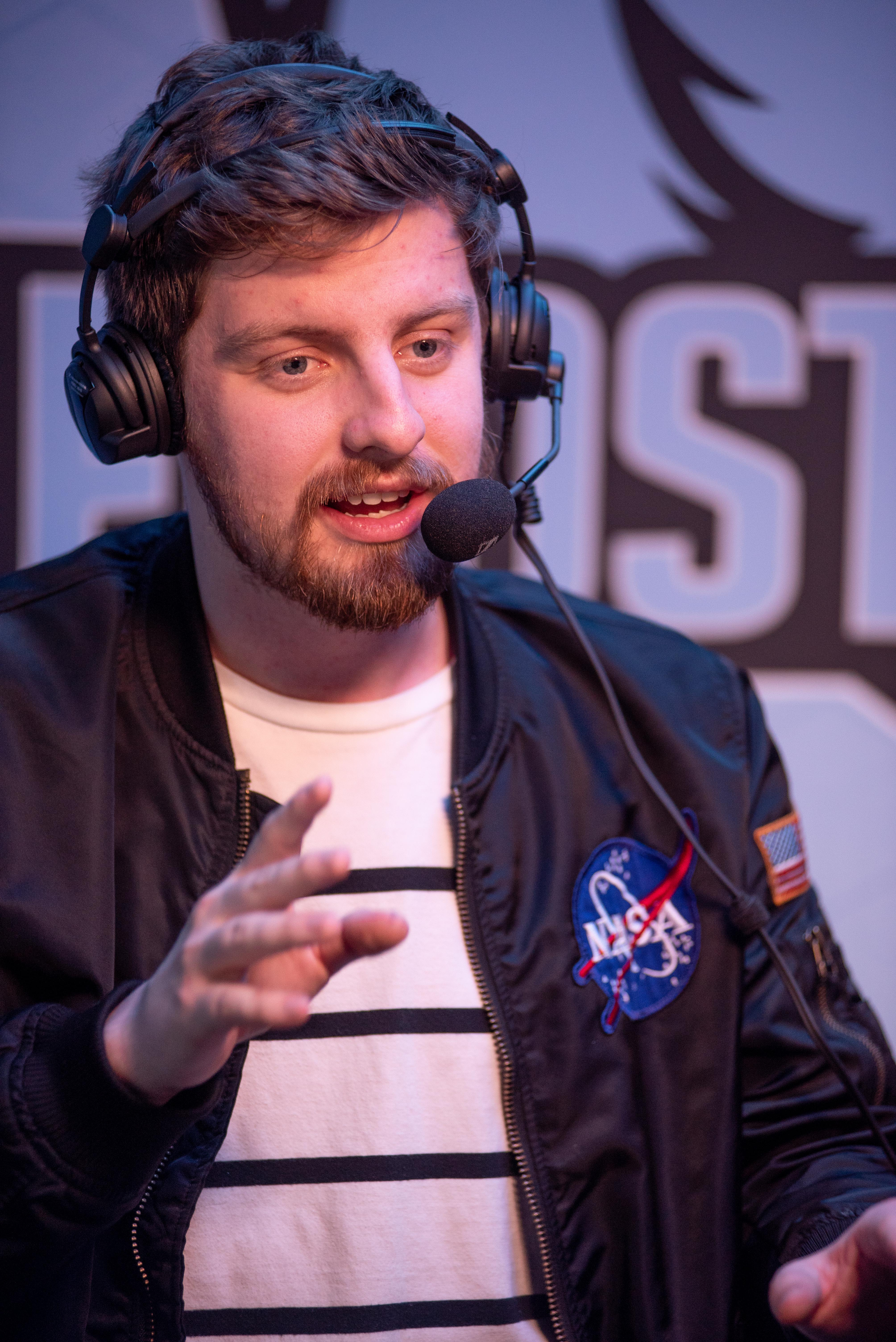
- Rabon in 2020
- Born: Jacob Rabon; December 19, 1995 (age 30); Norman, Oklahoma, U.S.
- Occupations: YouTuber; esports personality; musician

YouTube information
- Channel: Jacob Alpharad
- Years active: 2014–present
- Genres: Gaming; comedy
- Subscribers: 3.88 million
- Views: 1.93 billion
- Alpharad's voice An audio extract of Rabon's YouTube video "Ridley Confirmed?!"
- Last updated: September 6, 2026

Jacob Rabon IV (born December 19, 1995), better known by their (Note: Rabon uses they/them pronouns.) pseudonym Alpharad, is an American YouTuber, Twitch streamer, Esports personality and musician. They are known for their gaming videos, especially on the Super Smash Bros. series, along with their participation in the fighting game community as an announcer/commentator. They are also known for their "Nuzlocke" content, a challenge run of various Pokémon games to make them more difficult. Currently, they focus on creating variety content, often with friends, with fellow YouTuber Jaiden Animations being one of their most frequent collaborators.

== Early life ==
Rabon was born on December 19, 1995, in Norman, Oklahoma, where they attended Norman North High School. They gained an interest in filmmaking around the fifth grade, uploading comedic videos for their friends. One of their first videos was Major O's. Later, they would take video editing and cinematography classes in high school. They attended community college with the original goal of becoming an editor, but dropped out to pursue content creation once their channel had begun to take off.

== Career ==
=== YouTube ===
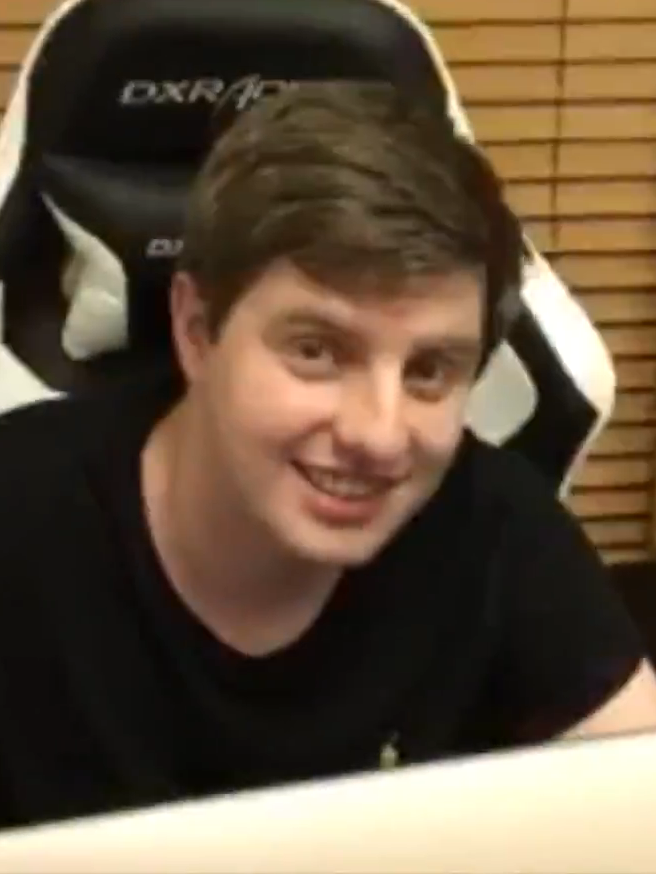
Rabon in 2017

Rabon created their main YouTube channel on January 13, 2014. Since its creation, they have made various gaming videos on their channel, "Alpharad", including the Super Smash Bros. series, Pokémon, Splatoon, Sonic the Hedgehog, and Among Us, as well as other Nintendo titles. They have also dabbled in speedrunning, specifically in a video of them playing through a Super Mario 64 first-person shooter fan game, as well as being a Super Mario Odyssey speedrunner.

Other videos of theirs include video game related challenges and streams. In 2021, Rabon collaborated with YouTuber Jaiden Animations on a charity stream for Red Nose Day which involved removing Pokémon from their team after reaching various donation incentives. In 2022, they played Pokémon Go in the Warner Grand theater located in Los Angeles during a Halloween event. Following a series of Nuzlocke challenges as provoked by their friend, fellow YouTuber, and self-proclaimed rival Pokémon Challenges, on April 10, 2023, YouTube Gaming officially dubbed them the "Nuzlocke King".

While a majority of their channel has gaming content, Rabon's channel also includes recounts or videos of fun challenges or experiences they have had, such as them talking about their experiences at Universal Studios, Japan, or an edited video of an Awards Show they hosted for their friends.

In 2020, Rabon signed with the Creative Artists Agency. Rabon's main YouTube channel has reached over 3 million subscribers as of April 2023.

=== Esports ===
Rabon has been involved in esports as a tournament organizer and affiliate with other prominent esports personalities. In January 2020, they participated in a Pokémon VGC tournament hosted by Wolfe Glick with fellow competitive Super Smash Bros. players Ludwig Ahgren, ESAM, and Mew2King amongst other content creators.

Two months later, in the midst of the COVID-19 pandemic, Rabon co-hosted five online tournaments for Super Smash Bros. Ultimate called the "Quarantine Series" with fellow YouTuber MoistCr1tikal, which consisted of two events, Minors and Majors, offering US$5,000 and US$10,000 in prizes, respectively. The major invitationals featured top Super Smash Bros. players such as MkLeo, Samsora, Nairo and Marss, and was streamed on both MoistCr1tikal's Twitch channel and Rabon's YouTube channel.

In 2018, Rabon purchased a monthly stake for the esports organization, Panda Global, becoming their content director and a minority shareholder. They had previously expressed their desire to hold more weight in the organization.

In 2021, Rabon hosted another tournament in Super Smash Bros. Ultimate, dubbed a "Portal Smash" tournament, that involved competitive players fighting on recreated stages with added obstacles and hazards. Later in October, Rabon hosted a Nickelodeon All-Star Brawl charity tournament with Panda Global member Coney for the Breast Cancer Research Foundation. The tournament featured content creators such as MoistCr1tikal, Ludwig Ahgren, Jaiden Animations and Trihex, and ultimately raised over $100,000.

== Other ventures ==
=== Music ===
Rabon is also a musician, and they formed a band called Ace of Hearts. Their first single, "Fool for You", was released on April 1, 2020. The band's first EP, Monophobia, was released on June 5, 2020. This was then followed by another single, "Silver Lining", which was released on July 1, 2020. The band's second EP, Scorpion Queen, was released on December 13, 2020. The band's single "Lights Off" was released on March 31, 2021. Ace of Hearts's most recent single, "Deadbeat Boulevard", was released on November 12, 2021. Their first full-length album, "Frozen in Time", was released on December 10, 2021.

Monophobia
No.	Title	Length
1.	"Fool for You"	3:09
2.	"Manic Daydream"	2:36
3.	"Lighter Than Air"	5:35
4.	"Monophobia"	3:26
Total length:		14:47

Scorpion Queen
No.	Title	Length
1.	"Scorpion Queen"	5:50
2.	"Your Name"	5:20
3.	"All the Rain"	4:17
Total length:		15:27

Frozen in Time
No.	Title	Length
1.	"Lights Off"	3:12
2.	"Deep Space"	2:46
3.	"Find Me in Your Dreams"	4:35
4.	"Silver Lining"	4:30
5.	"Monophobia II"	3:56
6.	"Your Name"	5:21
7.	"Queen of Everything"	3:41
8.	"Deadbeat Boulevard"	3:38
9.	"Waiting for Your Call"	4:34
10.	"A Life Frozen in Time"	7:24
Total length:		43:41

=== Copypasta Theatre ===
Rabon staged a performance in 2021 at the Black Box Theatre in Los Angeles called "Copypasta Theatre". It featured several performers reciting copypasta and tweets from the professional gamer Ninja. Videos of the event went viral on the internet.

== Personal life ==
During an episode of Rabon and Coney's podcast, How Did We Get Here?, Rabon opened up about their experience being diagnosed with ADHD. In the same podcast, they also revealed that they are somewhere in the asexual and aromantic spectrum. Rabon has also confirmed they are bisexual.

Rabon and fellow YouTuber Jaiden Animations purchased a house together in Sherman Oaks, Los Angeles in 2022. In February 2026, Rabon stated that the two had moved to the Pacific Northwest.

== See also ==
- Super Smash Bros. in esports
