= Jean-Jacques Askenasy =

Israeli neurologist

- ז'אן-ז'אק אשכנזי
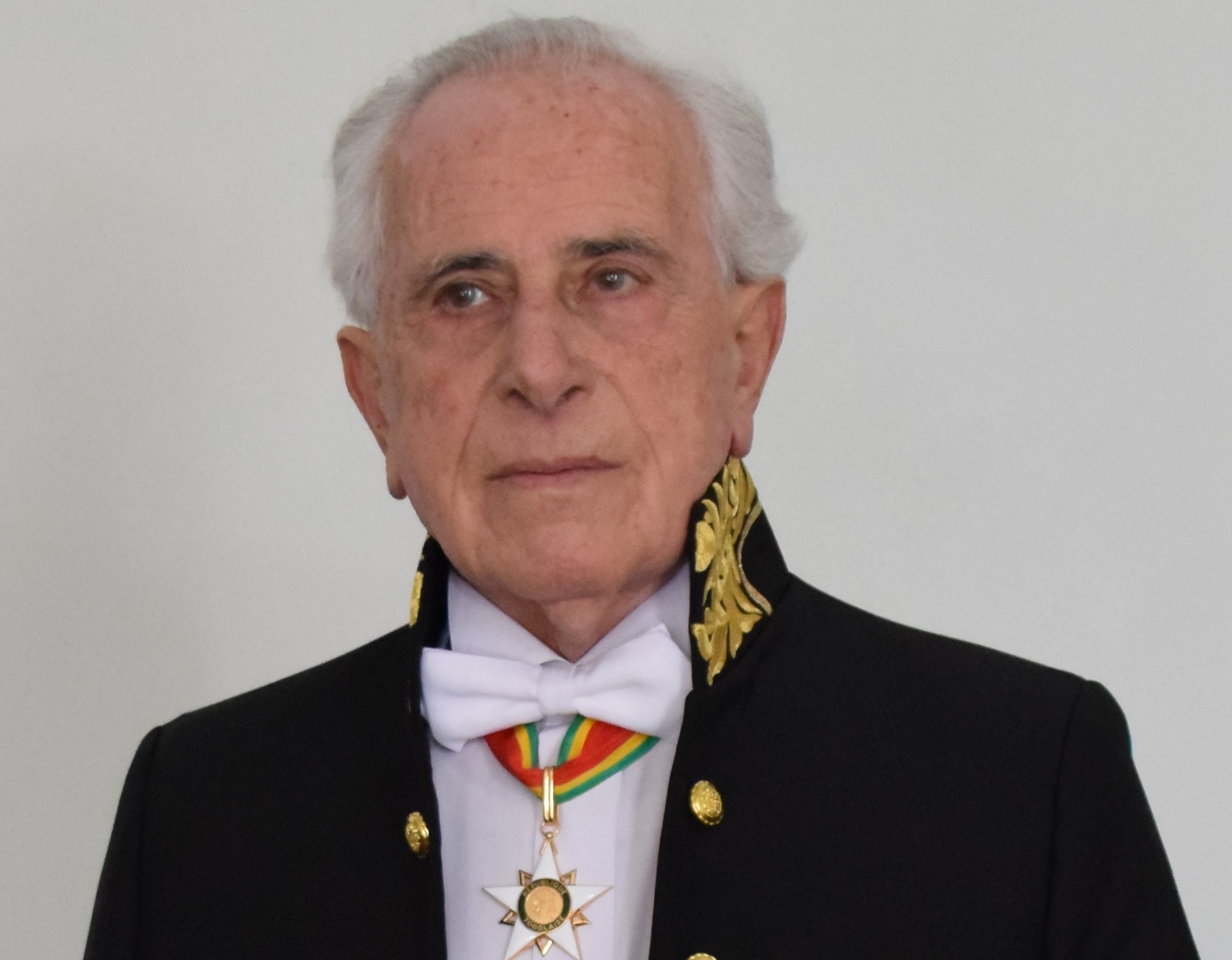
- Jean-Jacques Askenasy
- Born: November 1929 (age 96–97); Bulgaria
- Citizenship: Israeli
- Education: University of Cluj
- Occupations: Neurobiologist; Professor
- Years active: 1954-present
- Known for: Research on sleep disorders and Parkinson's disease
- Awards: Honorary member of the Romanian Academy
- Scientific career
- Fields: Neurology; Sleep medicine
- Workplaces: Sheba Medical Center; Tel Aviv University; Mount Sinai Hospital, Manhattan
- Website: Official website

Jean-Jacques Askenasy (Hebrew: ז'אן-ז'אק אשכנזי) (born 13 November 1929 in Sofia) is a Bulgarian-born Israeli neurologist and sleep medicine specialist renowned for his pioneering research on sleep disorders in neurological conditions, particularly in patients with Parkinson's disease. He is a Member of Honor of the Romanian Academy and a Member of Honor of the Real Academy of Barcelona.

== Education ==
Askenasy received his Doctor of Medicine degree cum laude from Babeș–Bolyai University in Cluj-Napoca in 1954. He completed postgraduate training in neurology at the Institute of Neurology of the Romanian Academy and obtained a Doctor of Science degree from the C. I. Parhon University in Bucharest in 1969.

== Career ==
After completing his medical training, Askenasy was appointed to academic and clinical positions in Romania, including chairman of the Department of Neurology at Băneasa University Hospital in Bucharest. In 1972 he emigrated to Israel, where he joined the Tel Aviv Sourasky Medical Center (Ichilov Hospital) and Tel Aviv University as a neurologist.

Between 1974 and 1975 he participated in neuroscience research at the Weizmann Institute of Science. In 1981 he was appointed associated professor of neurology at the Mount Sinai School of Medicine in New York, where he participated in clinical and sleep-research projects, including work on Parkinson’s disease and sleep disorders.

In 1985 Askenasy became director of the Sleep Medicine Center at Sheba Medical Center and organized academic courses in sleep medicine at Tel Aviv University. In 1986 he was appointed professeur agrégé at the Pierre and Marie Curie University (Clinique Charcot) in Paris. From 1995 he served as clinical professor of neurology at the Sackler Faculty of Medicine of Tel Aviv University. He later also held a professorship in forensic science at the Buchmann Faculty of Law.

Askenasy is a associated member of the American Academy of Neurology.

== Publications ==
Askenasy is the author of 9 books, 13 book chapters, and 91 scientific articles.

== Awards ==
- 1964 – La Médaille des Journées Internationales de Grenoble, France
- 1981 – Honorary Citizen of the City of Yeruham, Israel
- 1995 – Médaille Pierre Castaigne, France
- 1997 – Merit Certificate of the Ministry of Education, Israel
- 1999 – Officier de l'Ordre de Mono, Togo
- 2001 – Diplôme d’honneur de l'AMIF, France
- 2003 – Meritul Academiei Române, Romania
- 2012 – Crystal Trophy & Diploma of Excellence of Medical Life Gala, Romania
- 2013- Decorated by the President of Romania with "Meritul Sanitar" rank "Officer"
- 2016- Membre d'Honneur de l'Academia Română
- 2017- Comandeur de l'Ordre de Mono - Togo
- 2018- Membro Honorario de la Real Academia Barcelona
- 2018 – Prize of Excellence "Augustin Buzura", Romania
- 2019- Centenart Prize – Romania
