= Myth (gamer) =

American live streamer (born 1999)

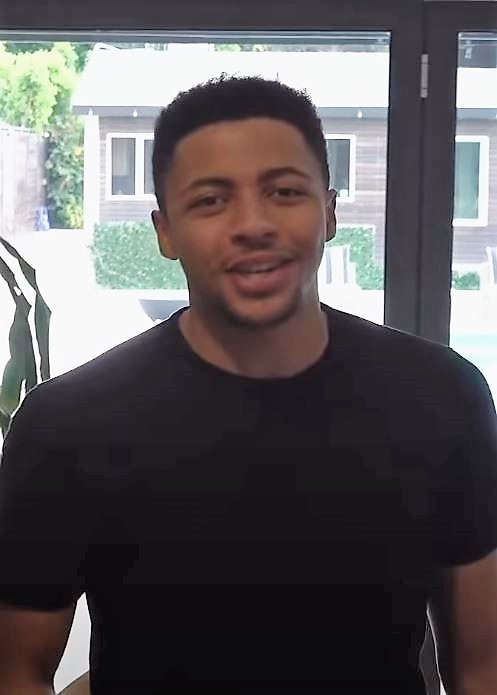
- Kabbani in 2021

Personal information
- Born: Ali Kabbani; May 24, 1999 (age 27); Dearborn, Michigan, U.S.

Career information
- Games: Fortnite Battle Royale; Valorant

Team history
- 2018–2022: Team SoloMid

Twitch information
- Channel: Myth
- Years active: 2016–2022; 2024–present
- Followers: 7 million

YouTube information
- Channel: Myth
- Years active: 2013–present
- Subscribers: 4.43 million
- Views: 427 million
- Last updated: April 14, 2026

Ali Kabbani (born May 24, 1999), better known as Myth, is an American live streamer on YouTube and Twitch known for playing Fortnite Battle Royale. Kabbani has over 4.4 million subscribers on YouTube and 7 million followers on Twitch.

== Streaming career ==
Kabbani's YouTube account was created on November 3, 2013. He started live streaming on Twitch in 2016 and mainly streamed Paragon, a third-person multiplayer online battle arena developed by Epic Games. His streams became much more popular when he started streaming Fortnite Battle Royale in the latter half of 2017. At the end of January 2018, Kabbani had over 200,000 followers on Twitch and by the end of June of the same year, the number had increased to over 3.2 million.

Kabbani joined Team SoloMid (TSM) in 2018 and captained a team that consisted of himself, Daequan, Darryle "Hamlinz" Hamlin and Juan "CaMiLLs" Camilla (sub). Kabbani participated in the Ninja Vegas Tournament in April 2018. Additionally, Kabbani's streams have included a variety of other popular streamers including, Pokimane and summit1g. Kabbani compares Fortnite building/editing mechanics to a shooter version of chess.

In March 2019 Kabbani was paid an undisclosed amount to stream Apex Legends. He played as TSM's team leader in the game Valorant during the Twitch Rivals series. As of July 2021, he has over 7.4 million followers and over 158 million views on Twitch.

On December 28, 2021, Kabbani announced that he would not be renewing his contract with TSM, citing the loss of a family environment, upon the departures of friends Bjergsen and Leena. In July 2022, Kabbani announced an exclusivity contract with YouTube.

== Other ventures ==
=== Boxing ===
In December 2022, Kabbani participated in Ludwig Ahgren's chess boxing event Mogul Chessboxing Championship at the Galen Center in Los Angeles, California, U.S. Kabbani fought and defeated Cherdleys via checkmate in the sixth round.

In April 2023, Kabbani made his traditional boxing debut on Creator Clash 2 against Hundar at the Amalie Arena in Tampa, Florida, U.S. Kabbani defeated Hundar via technical knockout in the first round.

In February 2025, it was announced that Kabbani would face Kevin Lerdwichagul on Creator Clash 3 on June 28 at the Amalie Arena in Tampa, Florida, U.S.

== Boxing record ==
=== Exhibition ===
1 fight	1 win	0 losses
By knockout	1	0

No.	Result	Record	Opponent	Type	Round, time	Date	Location
1	Win	1–0	Hundar	TKO	1 (5), 2:00	April 15, 2023	Amalie Arena, Tampa, Florida, U.S.

=== Chessboxing record ===
Chess boxing record
1 Fights, 1 Wins (0 KOs, 1 CMs)
Date	Result	Opponent	Event	Location	Method	Round	Time
2022-12-11	Win	Cherdleys	Mogul Chessboxing Championship	Galen Center, Los Angeles, California, U.S.	Checkmate	6	
Legend: Win Loss Draw/No contest Notes

== See also ==
- List of most-followed Twitch channels
