= Alexandra Botez =

American-Canadian chess player (born 1995)

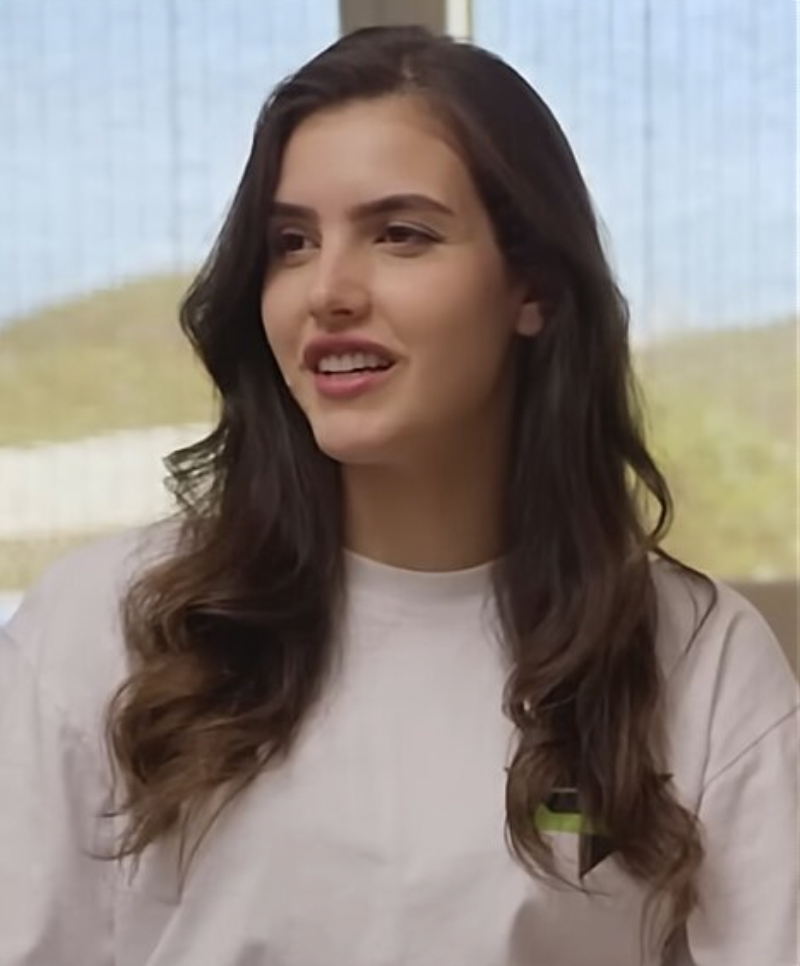
- Botez in 2022
- Born: Alexandra Valeria Botez; September 24, 1995 (age 31); Dallas, Texas, U.S.
- Citizenship: United States; Canada
- Education: Stanford University
- Occupations: Chess player; poker player; commentator; online streamer; YouTuber
- Years active: 2004–present
- Board member of: Susan Polgar Foundation
- Relatives: Andrea Botez (sister)

Twitch information
- Channel: BotezLive
- Genre: Gaming
- Game: Chess
- Followers: 1.3 million

YouTube information
- Channel: BotezLive
- Subscribers: 1.9 million
- Views: 1.139 billion
- Chess career
- Country: Canada
- Title: Woman FIDE Master (2013)
- FIDE rating: 2044 (October 2024)
- Peak rating: 2092 (April 2016)

Alexandra Valeria Botez (/ˈboʊtɛz/ BOH-tez; born 1995) is an American-born Canadian chess player, poker player, online streamer and YouTuber. She holds the chess title of Woman FIDE Master (WFM) and has a peak FIDE rating of 2092. She is a five-time Canadian girls' national champion and one-time U.S. girls' national champion. Botez has represented Canada at three Women's Chess Olympiads—in 2012, 2014, and 2016. Alexandra and her younger sister Andrea Botez host the BotezLive Twitch and YouTube channels; each has over 1 million followers and is one of the largest chess channels on its respective platform.

Botez began playing chess in Canada at age six and won her first girls' national championship at age eight. She later moved back to the United States where she was born and won U.S. Girls Nationals at age 15. Botez began streaming chess content online in 2016 while she was a student at Stanford University. Her sister Andrea appeared occasionally and later joined full-time to run the channels together in 2020. Already one of the most prominent Twitch chess channels with over 50,000 followers before 2020, the BotezLive channel grew tenfold in size in a span of about a year as part of the 2020 chess boom associated with the COVID-19 pandemic, the PogChamps internet celebrity chess tournaments, and Queen's Gambit series on Netflix. The Botez sisters regularly collaborate with other top chess streamers, such as akaNemsko. They also have collaborated with top chess players such as longtime World Chess Champion Magnus Carlsen and regularly collaborate with high-profile streamers outside of the chess community, stemming from their involvement in PogChamps. Botez and her sister are former members of Envy Gaming and later, OpTic Gaming after the organizations merged.

Botez is coached by Jon Ludvig Hammer, a former second to Magnus Carlsen. She has served on the Board of Directors of the Susan Polgar Foundation, which aims to promote chess to children in the United States, especially girls. Following her success as a chess streamer, Botez also began playing poker professionally. She has participated in the World Series of Poker as well as celebrity tournaments with other prominent streamers such as xQc and professional poker players such as Phil Hellmuth. Botez became an ambassador for GGPoker in 2024.

== Early life and background ==
Botez was born to Romanian immigrant parents. Although she was born in Dallas, Texas, she was raised in Vancouver, British Columbia. Botez's father introduced her to chess and started training her when she was six. She eventually became a member of the Romanian Community Centre chess club, Golden Knights, coached by Chess Master Valer Eugen Demian.

== Chess career ==
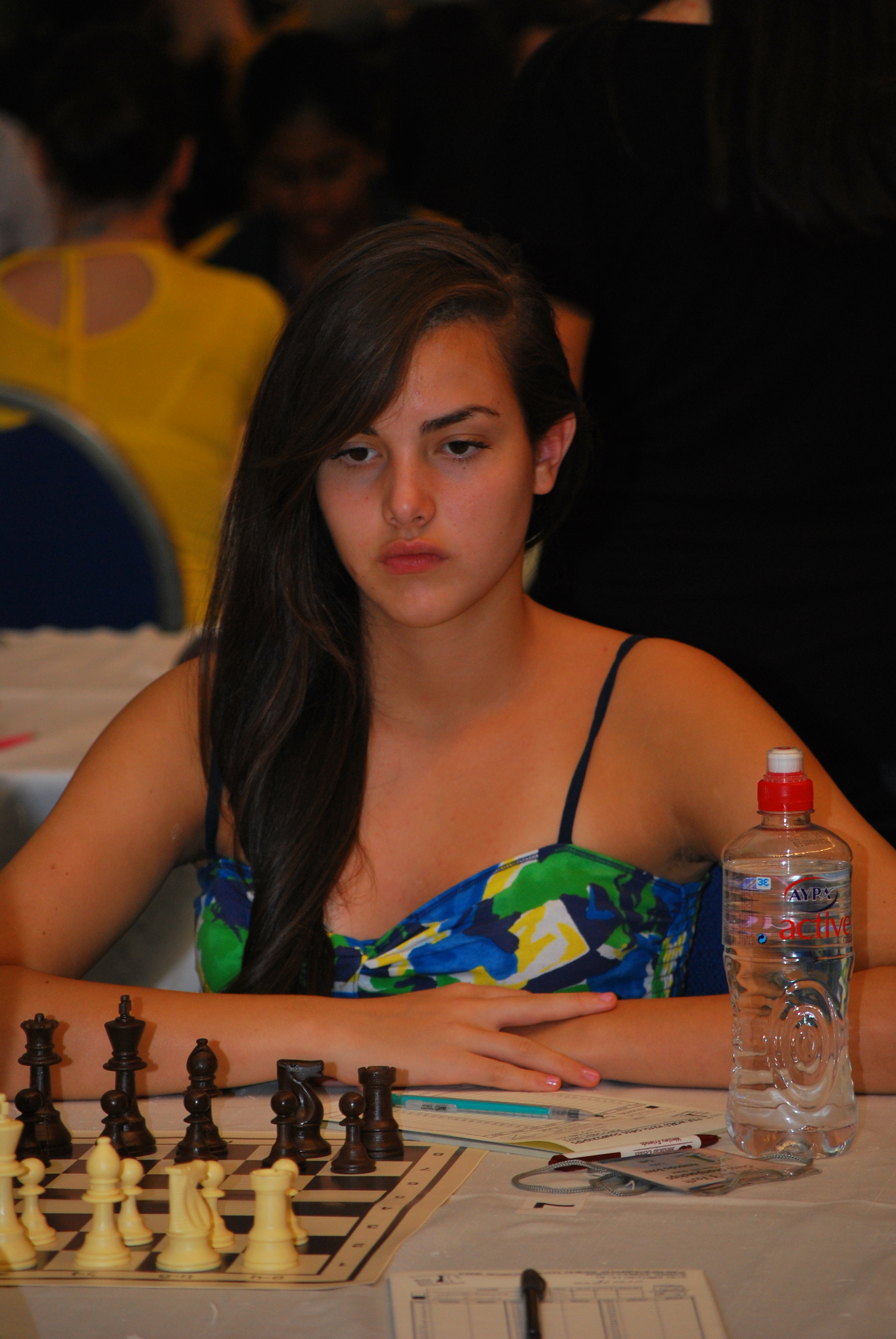
Botez during a chess tournament in 2010

Botez won her first Canadian girls' national championship in 2004 at age eight. She played for the Canadian national team in 2010 and later won four more Canadian youth national titles. After moving back to the United States, Botez won the U.S. Girls Nationals at age fifteen and twice represented the state of Oregon in the SPF Girls' Invitational established by Susan Polgar and her foundation. She participated in the World Youth Chess Championships four times, finishing as high as 31st place in 2009 in the girls' under-14 section while still unrated. In 2013, Botez earned the Woman FIDE Master (WFM) title by finishing in joint first place at the North American girls' U-16 national championship together with the winner Megan Lee.

While in high school in Oregon, Botez earned a full-ride chess scholarship to the University of Texas at Dallas by winning the 2011 Kasparov Chess Foundation All-Girls National Championship. She ultimately declined the scholarship to attend Stanford University, prioritizing academics over chess. At Stanford, she studied international relations with a focus on China. During her sophomore year in 2014, Botez became the second female president of the Stanford University Chess Club, after Cindy Tsai in 2005. She graduated in 2017.

Botez achieved her peak FIDE rating of 2092 in 2016, at the age of 20. She has regularly been ranked among the top ten Canadian female chess players. Botez has represented Canada at three Women's Chess Olympiads, playing on Board 4 in 2012, and Board 3 in 2014 and 2016. Her best performance at the Olympiad came in 2014, and Canada's best result with her on the team was 39th place in 2016. During 2014 and 2016, Botez played on the same team as fellow future prominent chess streamer Qiyu Zhou, also known as Nemo or akaNemsko.

At the 2024 Reykjavik Open, Botez defeated Jan Karsten, an International Master (IM) with a rating of 2323, which was the best win of her career by rating. Less than two months later in Orosei, Botez won the Sardinia World Chess Festival B-section for players rated under-2000 with a score of 8½/9, one-and-a-half points ahead of the field.

As of January 27, 2025, her rating is 2044 which ranks her 20,297th in the world among all active players.

== Playing style and notable games ==
Botez vs. Solomons, Baku 2016

Position: a8 black rook, f8 black rook, g8 black king, a7 black pawn, b7 black pawn, d7 black bishop, f7 black pawn, g7 black pawn, h7 white bishop, c5 black queen, d5 white knight, f4 white pawn, b3 white pawn, e3 white pawn, h3 white pawn, a2 white pawn, g2 white pawn, d1 white queen, f1 white rook, g1 white king

Position after White's check on move 21. After exchanging her rook for her opponent's knight on c5, Botez launches a series of checks which forces the win of her opponent's queen on move 24.

Botez often plays chess with an aggressive, adaptive style of play. In the 2016 Chess Olympiad held in Azerbaijan, she showcased her attacking style against opponent Anzel Solomons. During this match, Botez, playing as White, offers to exchange her rook for Solomons' knight on move 20. Solomons agrees to this exchange. However, this proves to be a tactical error, which turns the game in Botez's favor. Seizing the opportunity, Botez sacrifices her bishop on move 21, ultimately allowing her to check with her queen on move 22 and check with her knight on move 23, thereby winning Solomons' queen on move 24. Having built a solid advantage, Botez advances her kingside pawns until Solomons resigns the game.

1.d4 d5 2.c4 c6 3.Nf3 Nf6 4.Nc3 e6 5.e3 Nbd7 6.Bd3 Bd6 7.O-O O-O 8.b3 e5 9.cxd5 cxd5 10.Nb5 Bb8 11.dxe5 Nxe5 12.h3 Ne4 13.Bb2 Qf6 14.Nxe5 Bxe5 15.Bxe5 Qxe5 16.Rc1 Bd7 17.f4 Qe7 18.Nc7 Nc5 19.Nxd5 Qd6 20.Rxc5 Qxc5 21.Bxh7+ Kxh7 22.Qh5+ Kg8 23.Nf6+ gxf6 24.Qxc5 Bc6 25.Qf5 Kg7 26.Qg4+ Kh7 27.Qf5+ Kg7 28.e4 Rad8 29.Rf3 Rd1+ 30.Kh2 Rfd8 31.Rg3+ Kf8 32.Qc5+ Ke8 33.Rg8+ Kd7 34.Rxd8+ Kxd8 35.h4 Kc7 36.h5 Rd8 37.Qe7+ Rd7 38.Qxf6 Kc8 39.Qf5 1–0

Botez's most-played opening is the King's Indian Defense, in which Black allows White to advance their pawns to the center of the board in the first two moves.

Botez's chess coach is Jon Ludwig Hammer, a Norwegian Grandmaster (GM) who has been rated above 2700 and served as a second to his compatriot Magnus Carlsen in his first World Championship match. Hammer also often commentates on Botez's games on her Twitch channel.

The "Botez Gambit", a tongue-in-cheek term, occurs when a player blunders their queen. It originated with viewers of Botez's streams, but Botez has herself used it self-mockingly.

== Content creation ==
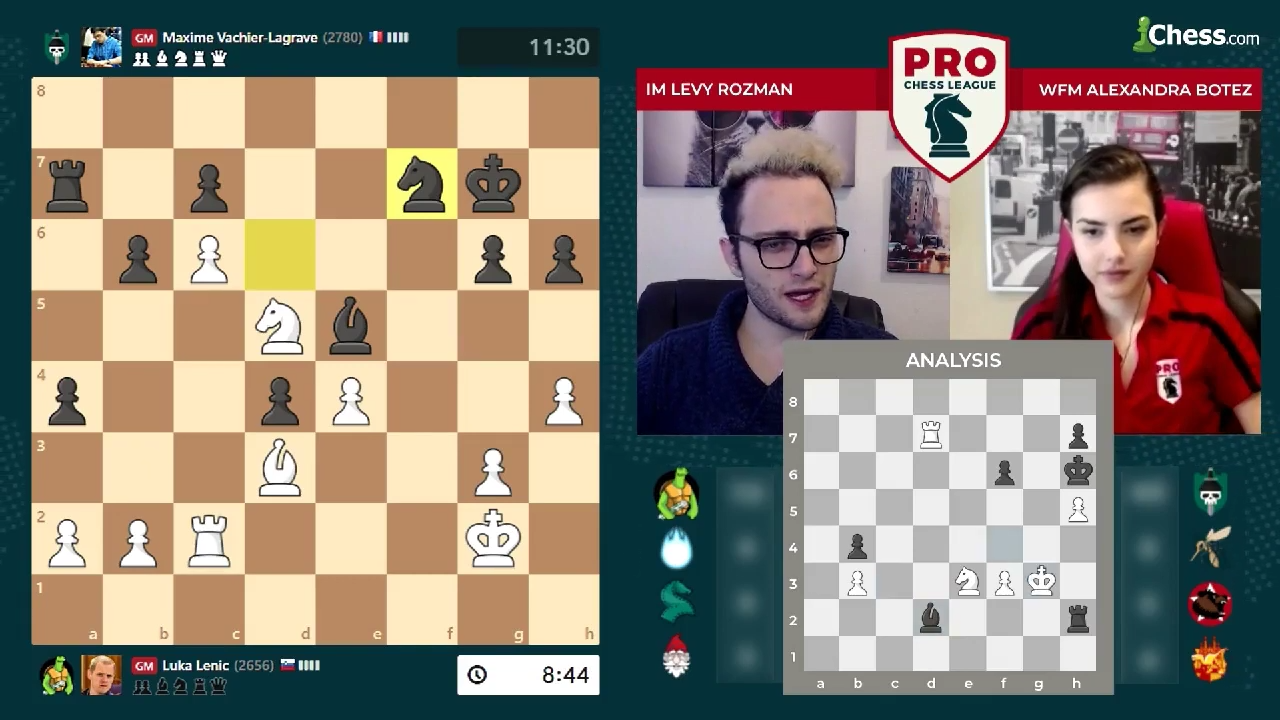
Botez commentating Pro Chess League with IM Levy Rozman in January 2019

In 2016, Botez started streaming chess content on Twitch during her junior year at Stanford University. Her channel quickly gained traction, and in 2020, she was joined by her younger sister, Andrea Botez. Together, they host the BotezLive Twitch and YouTube channels, which have garnered more than 2,700,000 followers combined. The sisters frequently collaborate with other chess streamers on the platform, such as GM Hikaru Nakamura and WGM Qiyu Zhou. She is credited, along with her sister Andrea Botez, Hikaru Nakamura, GothamChess, and more, for popularizing chess on Twitch. Botez's streaming popularity has helped her become one of the most recognizable faces on the Chess.com platform. In response to her prominence as a female chess player, the mainstream media often compares Botez to the fictional Beth Harmon, the protagonist of The Queen's Gambit. Botez has served as a chess commentator. She covered the 2018 and 2019 PRO Chess League Finals, the most popular team chess championship, along with IM Daniel Rensch, IM Anna Rudolf, and GM Robert Hess.

In December 2020, the Botez sisters signed with the Texas-based esports organization Envy Gaming. By partnering with the Botez sisters, Envy hopes to expand its ambassador network with diverse gaming content creators. They would later move to Los Angeles, California, where they would join other content creators such as JustaMinx and CodeMiko in the Envy Content House.

In January 2021, Botez faced controversy from fellow chess creator and grandmaster, Hikaru Nakamura, who said that Botez's exclusivity of streaming in the "Just Chatting" section is damaging to the chess community.

In December 2021, Botez came under fire after she appeared to defend Dubai's alleged use of slavery on an AT&T sponsored stream hosted from the 2021 World Chess Championship taking place in the United Arab Emirates. While she later claimed she was being taken out of context, the statement still caused an uproar from her stream chat and folks online who were offended by the comment.

In May 2022, Botez had Terra (Luna) founder Do Kwon on stream to promote Luna 5 days before its -99.6% plunge. This was later covered by Comedian John Oliver, host of Last Week Tonight on his show.

On July 20, 2022, the Botez sisters signed with Creative Artists Agency. The agency will work with them on the development of original content, new IP ventures, and "strategic growth across platforms and talent". In August 2022, it was announced that the Botez sisters had joined OpTic Gaming after Envy Gaming announced the retirement of their Envy brand.

In 2023, the Botez sisters were named to Forbes' 30 Under 30 list in the games category. Later in April 2023, they appeared on Rolling Stone's list of the 20 Most Influential Creators in 2023. On July 13, 2024, she competed in a MrBeast video titled "50 YouTubers Fight for $1,000,000" and managed to place second in the competition.

=== Botez abroad ===
In November 2021, the Botez sisters announced a show on their Twitch channel called Botez Abroad, a Twitch original travel show where they travel to cities around the world and stream their in-person chess matches at various venues. The show has generated more than 20 million views and reached peak livestream viewership of 36,000 people.

== Poker career ==
Botez started playing poker professionally in 2021, after having already established herself as a prominent chess streamer, and began playing regularly in 2022. Botez cashed in the 2023 World Series of Poker Main Event, finishing 1,040th. She won her first live tournament title in 2023, a $550 freezeout side event at the PokerStars Caribbean Adventure, for $10,815. At WSOP Paradise in 2024, she finished 60th in a $10,000 event and 187th in the $25,000 WSOP Super Main Event, for combined winnings of $89,490. She has also played in celebrity tournaments, featuring fellow streamers such as xQc, fellow chess players such as Magnus Carlsen, and professional poker players such as Phil Hellmuth. Botez made $456,900 on a poker live stream on May 1, 2022, presented by the Hustler Live Casino, which featured fellow streamers along with poker pros.

In June 2023, Botez started a new YouTube channel called "Alexandra Botez", which focuses on poker content and her poker career. Botez became an ambassador for GGPoker in March 2024. In May 2025 she left GGPoker and signed with the sweepstakes poker site ClubWPT Gold.

In September 2026, Botez won ClubWPT Gold's Poker Champs, an eight-player heads-up bracket for content creators with a $500,000 prize pool. She defeated Eric "erobb221" Robbins Jr. in the first round, "PaymoneyWubby" in the semifinals and Sodapoppin in the final, winning $250,000, which Card Player described as the largest recorded tournament score of her career.

== Other ventures ==
In 2017, Botez co-founded CrowdAmp, a social media company. As of May 2019, that company has ceased operations.

In April 2020, Botez was elected to the board of directors of the Susan Polgar Foundation, a non-profit 501(c)3 organization that advocates for breaking gender barriers in chess. Within the past eighteen years, the Susan Polgar Foundation has assisted in offering more than $6 million in chess scholarships and prizes to students.

== Views on sexism in chess ==
Botez has talked about her encounters with sexism in her chess career. Regarding her stream, Botez has stated that until she brought in moderators, she was disturbed by the fact that "60% of it was just people trying to flirt with me and chat, or people just commenting on my appearance the entire time... They didn't care about the game play at all." Competitive chess has always been dominated by men, with male grandmasters outnumbering female grandmasters 50-to-one. Botez says, "It has taken very long to get to the point where we're starting to change the stereotype [to show] that women are not genetically inferior to men at playing chess."

Botez watched the Netflix show The Queen's Gambit and claimed the show understates the misogyny of that era through the female protagonist. She said the show glossed over many realities, especially considering the decade it is set in: "If the show had been historically accurate, Beth wouldn't have been able to compete in any world championship events". Botez cited the case of female grandmaster Susan Polgar, who said that in 1986 she was prevented from competing in a zonal tournament, a qualifying event for the World Chess Championship, because of her gender. Nevertheless, Botez was complimentary of protagonist Beth Harmon as a nuanced and inspirational figure for upcoming women in chess.

== Personal life ==
In 2020, Botez and her sister Andrea lived in New York. In 2022, they moved to Los Angeles, California.

== Awards and nominations ==
Ceremony	Year	Category	Result	Ref.
The Streamer Awards	2021	Best Chess Streamer	Won	
The Streamer Awards	2022	Best Chess Streamer	Nominated	
The Streamer Awards	2023	Best Chess Streamer	Nominated	
The Streamer Awards	2023	Best Shared Channel	Nominated	

=== Listicles ===
Publisher	Year	Listicle	Result	Ref.
Forbes	2023	30 Under 30: Games	Placed	
Rolling Stone	2023	20 Most Influential Creators	4th	
