= Elena Tomilova =

Russian volleyball player (born 1967)

Personal information
- Nationality: Russian
- Born: 6 November 1967 (age 58)
- Height: 184 cm (6 ft 0 in)

Volleyball information
- Number: 17 (national team)

Career
Years	Teams
1994	Uralochka Ekaterinburg

National team
1994	Russia

Elena Tomilova (born 6 November 1967) is a retired Russian female volleyball player. She was part of the Russia women's national volleyball team.

She participated in the 1994 FIVB Volleyball Women's World Championship. On club level she played with Uralochka Ekaterinburg.

== Clubs ==
- Uralochka Ekaterinburg (1994)
