= Sushi Ramen Riku =

Japanese YouTube personality (born 1999)

Riku Horiuchi
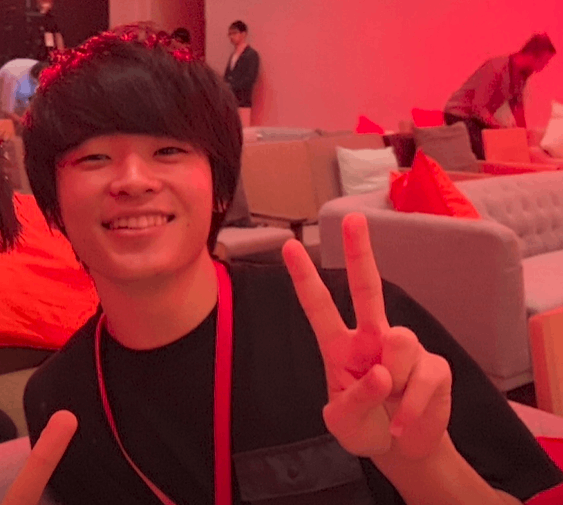
- Horiuchi at the YouTube Creator Summit in Tokyo, 2019
- Born: Riku Horiuchi (堀内陸); 30 May 1999 (age 27); Tokyo, Japan
- Other name: Sushi Ramen Riku
- Occupation: YouTuber

YouTube information
- Channel: すしらーめん《りく》
- Years active: 2013–present
- Subscribers: 10 million
- Views: 3.17 billion
- Last updated: 21 October 2025

Riku Horiuchi (堀内 陸; born 30 May 1999), professionally known as Sushi Ramen Riku (Japanese: すしらーめん《りく》), is a Japanese YouTube personality who had worked for Uuum. His channel has over 10 million subscribers and has been awarded with the Silver and Gold YouTube Play Button. The origin of its name is due to his two favorite foods, sushi and ramen.

== Career ==
He started making videos for YouTube in junior high school, where he was part of a group called "Sushi Ramen" with some classmates. After graduating, he attended to a different high school from his classmates and then he started working alone, although keeping the same name. Even after graduating, Riku and his friends were prohibited from broadcasting videos showing their respective schools, which led to the pixilation of several of their videos. He opened his main channel, Sushi Ramen Riku, on 23 October 2013, where he makes mostly experimental videos. On 21 May 2015, he opened a subchannel called Sushi Ramen 2nd.

== YouTube content ==
Riku's videos generally feature contrived practical stunts and experiments, often conceived supposedly to aid everyday convenience, such as building a rig to take off his pants using pressurized air or to break world records such as using a massive rubberband slingshot to catapult him while riding an office chair. Riku also films his occasional pranks on family members.
