= Arthur Kreindler =

Romanian neurologist

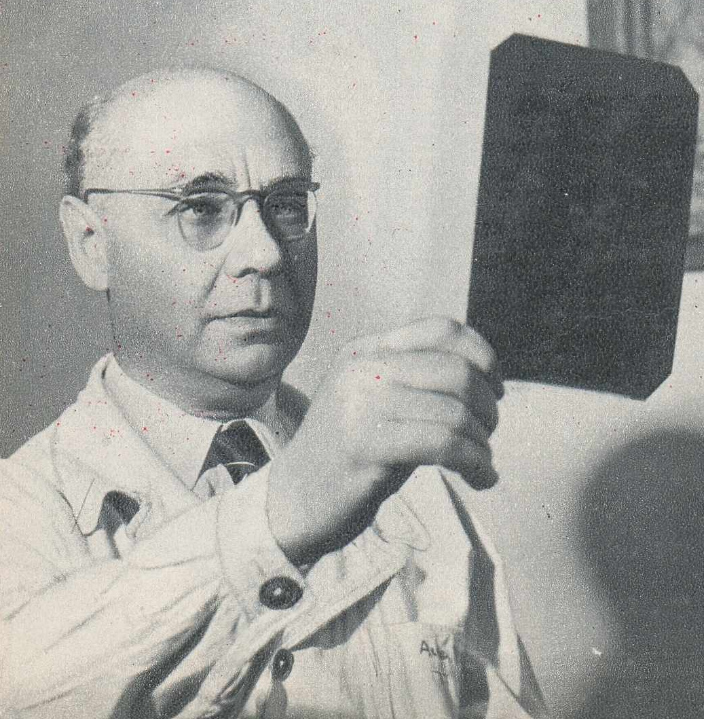
Arthur Kreindler 1957

Arthur Kreindler (15 May 1900 – 28 May 1988) was a Romanian neurologist of Jewish origin, academic, professor of neurology at the Carol Davila University of Medicine and Pharmacy in Bucharest, and director of the Institute of Neurology Research of the Romanian Academy. In 1948 he was elected titular member of the Academy.

== Bibliography ==
- Arthur Kreindler (ed.), Epilepsia. Cercetări clinice și experimentale, Editura Academiei Republicii Populare Romîne, 1955.
