= Mihai Botez (mathematician) =

Romanian mathematician and dissident (1940–1995)

Mihai Horia Botez (18 November 1940 – 11 July 1995) was a Romanian mathematician and dissident, nicknamed "Romania's Sakharov" by the international press. A leading statistician, he played a key role in founding the study of futurology in the Eastern European country, before becoming a critic of the communist regime's catastrophic economic policies. He survived four suspicious attacks, including a stabbing, a car ramming, and a beating that left him hospitalized and which human rights groups blamed on the country's secret police, the Securitate.

Born in Bucharest, he graduated from the Faculty of Mathematics of the University of Bucharest, where he was a student of Octav Onicescu. Under the guidance of Gheorghe Mihoc, he studied an extension of the notion of Markov chain, obtaining his PhD in 1967 from the Mathematical Statistics Institute of the Romanian Academy. He taught at the Bucharest Academy of Economic Studies, before moving to the University of Bucharest, where he became a professor in 1970. In 1974 he was appointed by the Education Minister, Mircea Malița, inaugural director of the Center for the Study of Futures and Development. After visiting for several months in 1976 the Woodrow Wilson Center in Washington, D.C., he was fired the next year from his academic positions for expressing his dissidence to the regime of Nicolae Ceaușescu. Botez was granted asylum in the United States in 1987, before returning to Romania in 1989 after the Romanian Revolution.

He died on 11 July 1995, at the age of 54 at Elias Hospital in Bucharest. According to Dorin Tudoran, CIA-affiliate Stefan Halper came to Romania with a proposal to bury Botez at the Arlington National Cemetery, but his widow, Magda Botez, turned down the offer.

A school in Sector 3 of Bucharest bears his name since 2003.

== Works ==
- Botez, Mihai C. (1967). "Théorie ergodique pour les systèmes à liaisons complètes". Bulletin mathématique de la Société des Sciences Mathématiques de la République Socialiste de Roumanie (in French). 11 (59) (1): 25–54. MR 0228062.
- Botez, Mihai C.; Theodorescu, Radu (1965). "On the ergodic behaviour of discrete random processes". Revue Roumaine de Mathématiques Pures et Appliquées. 10: 991–1010. MR 0200967.
