= Mihai Ioan Botez =

Romanian neurologist

Mihai Ioan Botez (29 June 1927 – 2 June 1998) was born in Ploiești, Romania, trained at Carol Davila University of Medicine and Pharmacy, a neurologist and academic who specialized in the field of neuropsychology. He immigrated to Montreal in the 1970s, becoming a professor at the Université de Montréal and director of the department of Neurology at the hospital Hôtel-Dieu de Montréal.

Mihai Ioan Botez

== Academic life ==
Botez trained at the Romanian School of Neurology founded by Gheorghe Marinescu. He immigrated to Canada in the 1970s, where he became professor of neurology at the Université de Montréal and head of the Neurology Service at the hospital Hôtel-Dieu de Montréal. From 1985, his main work featured the role of the cerebellum on human behavior.

== Behavioral neurology ==
Botez became a proficient researcher in several fields of behavioral neurology in both human and animal subjects.

=== Folic acid ===
In the 1970s, Botez' main research subject was the effects of folic acid and thiamine on the central nervous system, relevant for restless legs syndrome, epilepsy, polyneuropathy, and chronic fatigue syndrome. These articles demonstrated the use of B vitamins in the treatment of neurologic symptoms.

=== Cerebellum ===
In the 1980s, Botez pioneered studies on the effects of lesions to the cerebellum on cognition, including patients with spinocerebellar ataxia, Friedreich's ataxia, and mice with spontaneous mutations causing cerebellar damage, such as GRID2-Lc Lurcher. These articles demonstrated the role of the cerebellum in neuropsychology.

== Neurochemistry ==
Together with neurochemists Simon N Young of the Allan Memorial Institute and Tomas A Reader of the Université de Montréal, Botez obtained measures of brain concentrations of neurotransmitters such as biogenic amine metabolites of dopamine, norepinephrine, and serotonin in patients, as well as concentrations and receptor density of these neurotransmitters and glutamic acid in mouse brain, he and his co-workers in neurochemistry provided vital cues to underlying neurochemical abnormalities in patients with B vitamin anomalies and patients with cerebellar atrophy. Such studies lead to successful trials with amantadine, a substance facilitating dopamine transmission, to ameliorate reaction times in cerebellar atrophy, as well as respiratory failure.
