= Valkyrae =

American online streamer and YouTuber (born 1992)

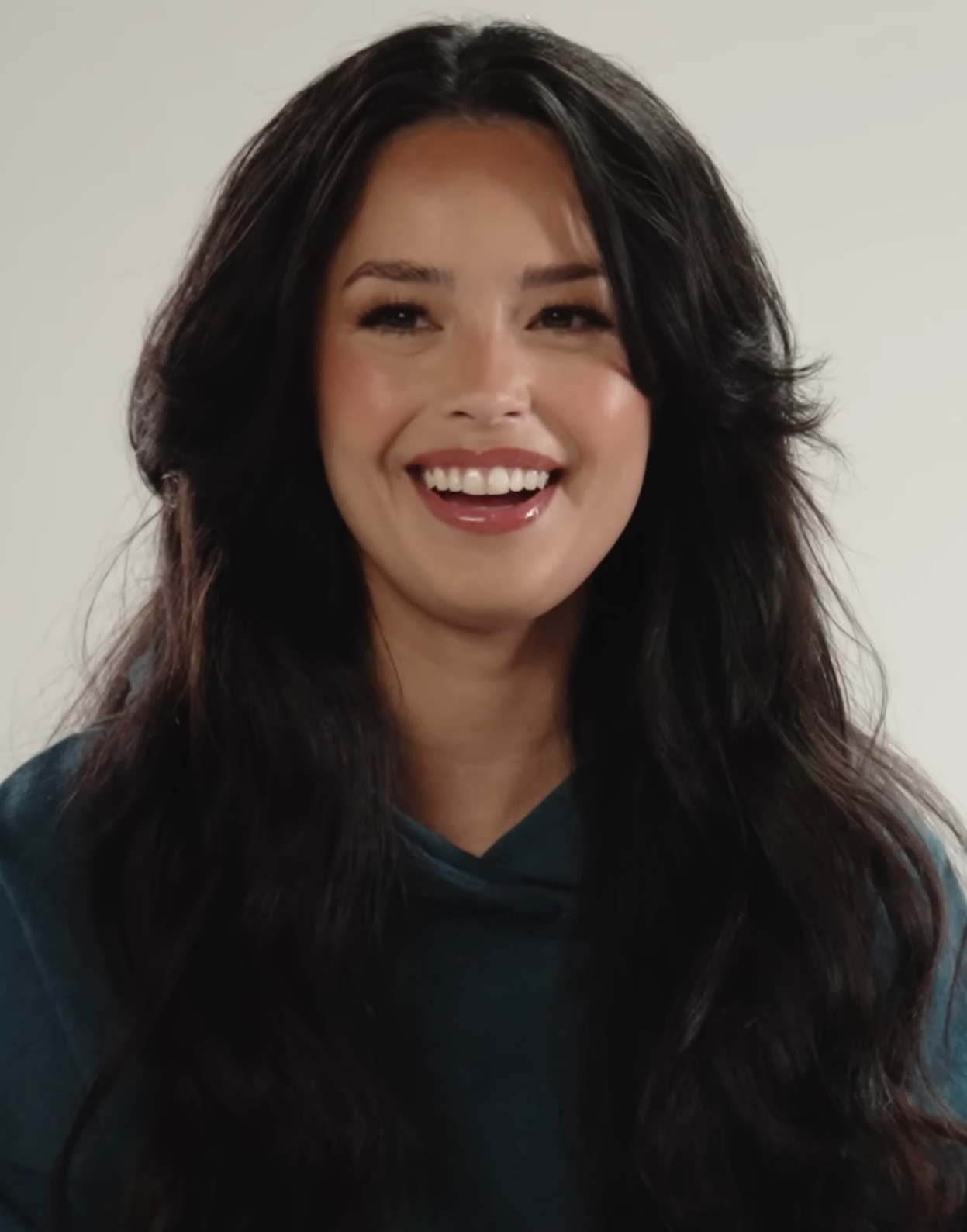
- Valkyrae in 2023
- Born: Rachell Marie Hofstetter; January 8, 1992 (age 34); Moses Lake, Washington, U.S.
- Occupations: Online streamer; YouTuber
- Organization: 100 Thieves

Twitch information
- Channel: Valkyrae
- Years active: 2015–2020; 2025–present
- Followers: 1.6 million

YouTube information
- Channel: Valkyrae
- Years active: 2014–present
- Genres: Gaming; vlog; react
- Subscribers: 4.05 million
- Views: 969.91 million
- Last updated: July 4, 2026

Rachell Marie Hofstetter (born January 8, 1992), also known by her pseudonym Valkyrae, is an American online streamer, YouTuber, and podcaster. She is a co-owner of the gaming organization 100 Thieves and founder and CEO of the media company Hihi Studios.

Hofstetter began streaming on Twitch in 2015. She had her breakthrough by playing the competitive online game Fortnite in 2018 and joined 100 Thieves as their first female content creator. In 2020, she switched streaming platforms by signing an exclusive contract with YouTube. Later that year, she saw significant follower growth and reached her peak viewership when playing the online social deduction game Among Us, which led to her winning the Game Award for "Content Creator of the Year" and the Streamy Award for best live streamer. She was also named "Gaming Creator of the Year" by Adweek in 2021 and was included on Forbes' 30 Under 30 list in 2022.

== Early life ==
Rachell Marie Hofstetter was born on January 8, 1992 to Marie Loyao and Richard Hofstetter, and grew up in Moses Lake, Washington. She is of Filipino and German descent and has three brothers and one younger sister. She cites her mother as the reason she became interested in video games, who encouraged her to pursue it as a hobby from a young age. She attended community college and worked a job at GameStop to support herself, later graduating with an associate degree in arts and science. She has worked various jobs including as a bank teller, waitress, babysitter, car wash employee, and an arcade attendant.

== Career ==
=== 2015–2019: Early career, initial popularity, and joining 100 Thieves ===
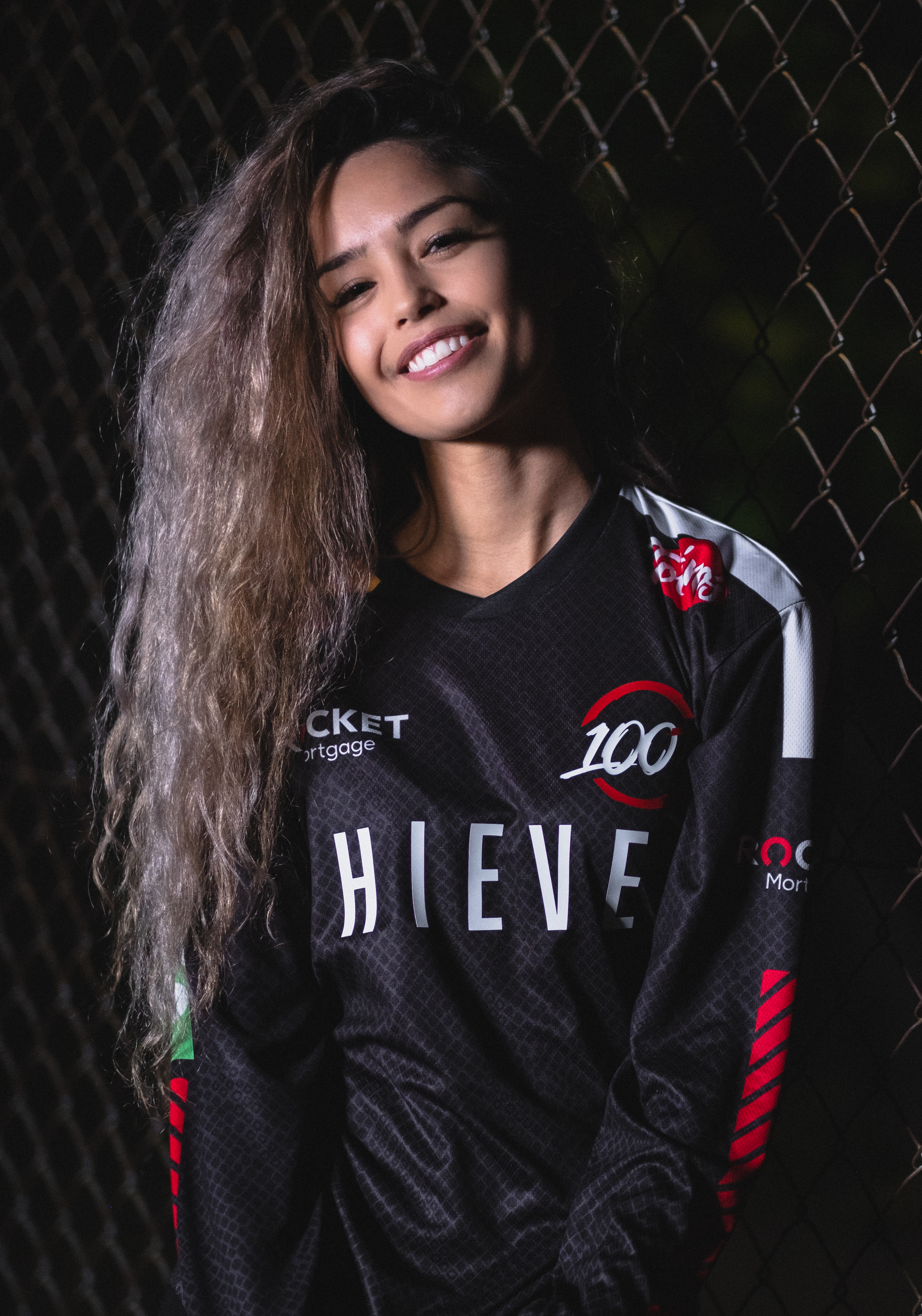
Hofstetter during a photoshoot for 100 Thieves in July 2019

While working at GameStop, Hofstetter began sharing her gaming hobby on Instagram, gaining a following. After being encouraged by her followers, she started live streaming on Twitch in 2015. She later began uploading her gaming content to YouTube and had her breakthrough by playing the competitive online game Fortnite in 2018. That October, she became the first female content creator for the gaming organization 100 Thieves. In May 2019, she was nominated for the Gaming award at the 11th Shorty Awards.

=== 2020–2024: Move to YouTube and mainstream success ===
On January 13, 2020, Hofstetter left Twitch for an exclusive streaming contract on YouTube. In her first three months on YouTube, she averaged around 1,500 concurrent viewers. Her stream then experienced significant growth and, in late 2020, regularly peaked at concurrent viewer counts exceeding 100,000. This was driven by her playing the online multiplayer social deduction game Among Us and collaborating with popular streamers like Disguised Toast, Sykkuno, Pokimane, PewDiePie, and MoistCr1tikal, in addition to public figures like politician Alexandria Ocasio-Cortez, musician Lil Nas X, and television personality Jimmy Fallon. Hofstetter became the fastest-growing female streamer of 2020 and surpassed Pokimane as the year's most-viewed female streamer. In December 2020, she won Content Creator of the Year award at the 2020 Game Awards.

On April 7, 2021, Hofstetter and CouRageJD joined the ownership group of 100 Thieves, alongside Dan Gilbert, Scooter Braun, Drake, and its founder, Nadeshot. As co-owners, they received equity in the company, which Forbes valued at $190 million at the time. In May 2021, she won Gaming Creator of the Year award at the 2021 Adweek Creator Visionary Awards. In December 2021, she won the Livestreamer award at the 11th Streamy Awards.

In 2022, she was named to Forbes' 30 Under 30 list in the games category. In March 2022, she was nominated for Best Variety Streamer at the 2022 Streamer Awards. In December 2022, she was nominated for Streamer of the Year and Variety Streamer at the 12th Streamy Awards. On March 11, 2023, she co-hosted the second annual Streamer Awards alongside the event's creator, QTCinderella; the ceremony averaged 425,000 live concurrent viewers. In April 2023, Hofstetter was featured on a seven-page spread for Vogue Philippines. Later in August 2023, she was nominated for Streamer of the Year and Variety Streamer at the 13th Streamy Awards.

In February 2024, she won The Sapphire Award at the third annual Streamer Awards. In May 2024, Hofstetter's streaming heavily involved playing a character on the modded Grand Theft Auto V roleplaying server NoPixel. Later that month, she was named among Gold House A100 honorees. In July 2024, she participated in the MrBeast video "50 YouTubers Fight for $1,000,000". In December 2024, she was nominated for The Sapphire Award at the fourth annual Streamer Awards.

=== 2025–present: Return to Twitch ===
By January 2025, Hofstetter's exclusive streaming contract with YouTube had expired. She signed a total of 3 contracts with YouTube, spanning 5 years. She returned to Twitch on January 8, while celebrating her 10th streaming anniversary and her 33rd birthday. During her first week, she was the most-watched female streamer on Twitch, based on hours watched.

On February 24, 2025, Hofstetter began a week-long IRL streaming marathon in Los Angeles with fellow streamer Brittany "Cinna" Watts titled Sis-A-Thon. Hoffstetter and Watts had planned on holding the marathon in January, but it was postponed due to the wildfires in Southern California that month. On March 2, the final night of the marathon, Hoffstetter, Watts, and their guest Emily "Emiru" Schunk, were targeted by a stalker at Pacific Park on the Santa Monica Pier. The streamers ended the marathon early and contacted the police.

In August 2025, Hostetter participated in the first Pokémon Nuzlocke Invitational hosted by PointCrow and Pchal, partnering with coach KyaColosseum. After initially losing the winner's bracket, she played through the loser's bracket to the grand finals, winning the tournament. In the same month, the developers of Waterpark Simulator added Hofstetter's voice for the seagull sound effects in the game after her playthrough and an impromptu audition on livestream.

In September 2025, Hofstetter was cast as the co-host alongside Fanum in season 1 of Inside: USA, which premiered on Netflix.

On November 7, 2025, Hofstetter and Watts began their second week-long streaming marathon titled Sis-A-Thon 2.

In July 2026, Hofstetter served on the faculty for the second installment of Kai Cenat's Streamer University creator bootcamp at Hendrix College. Acting as a professor during the multi-day event, she taught a course titled "Brand Elevation Beyond Streaming." The class focused on utilizing opportunities created through live-streaming to build broader careers, drawing on her own background in voice acting and film to instruct students. She was featured on the Time100 Creators 2026 list the same month.

On July 27, 2026, Hofstetter hosted the red carpet premiere for Spider-Man: Brand New Day in Los Angeles.

== Other activities ==
=== Acting ===
In 2021, Hofstetter appeared in several music videos, including "DayWalker" by Machine Gun Kelly featuring Corpse Husband, as well as "Build a Bitch" and "Inferno" by Bella Poarch. In March 2022, she voiced acted as Hannya Squad member for the English dub TV series of Tribe Nine. In December 2022, she voiced Squad Commander Red in the animated TV series Sonic Prime. In 2023, she made a cameo appearance as herself in the action-comedy film The Family Plan. In January 2025, she voiced the lead character, "Ratchet", in the animated film Goldbeak. In April 2025, it was revealed that Hofstetter had filmed a 30-second cameo for A Minecraft Movie, but the scene was cut; in the final release, she only appears in the background of a shot. In 2025, Hofstetter was also featured in QTCinderella (Blaire)’s music video for "Forever."

=== Business ventures ===
In September 2022, Hofstetter became an ambassador for the fitness apparel brand Gymshark. In September 2024, she founded the media company Hihi Studios to "develop and produce IP for graphic novels, TV and film projects with a specific emphasis on anime-inspired content." In June 2025, Hihi Studios announced their first project, a webtoon called Bad Influence.

=== Charity works ===
On April 6, 2021, Hofstetter participated in an Among Us charity livestream held by The Tonight Show host Jimmy Fallon with several notable celebrities such as Gaten Matarazzo and Noah Schnapp of Stranger Things, American hip-hop band The Roots members Questlove, Black Thought, and Captain Kirk Douglas, and fellow streamers and YouTubers Sykkuno and Corpse Husband. The event raised over $25,000 for Feeding America.

In December 2021, Hofstetter raised over $300,000 for New Story in an 8 hour livestream as part of "Thankmas", an annual charity event by YouTuber Jacksepticeye. In June 2022, Hofstetter participated in a Minecraft charity tournament held by the MC Championship with several other creators to raise money for The Trevor Project. Hofstetter also donated $10,000 towards the charity. In late November 2022, Hofstetter donated $15,000 towards No Kid Hungry during Ludwig Ahgren's charity event. In December 2022, Hofstetter participated in "Thankmas", to raise money for World Central Kitchen. The event raised over $10 million in donations. She participated again in 2024.

Hofstetter donated $10,000 towards the victims of the earthquake in Turkey and Syria on February 6, 2023.

In April 2024, Hofstetter visited the Alveus Sanctuary, a non-profit organization and sanctuary founded by Maya Higa. The livestream raised over $30,000 after Hofstetter doubled and matched her community's donations. She also donated $10,000 to the sanctuary for flood relief in July 2025. In December 2025, Hofstetter donated $50,000 to HEAL Palestine.

=== Podcasting ===
From October 2024 to April 2025, she had a podcast called Press Esc with artist Alyssa "Alythuh" Dios as her co-host. In April 2025, Press Esc concluded due to Dios moving to Hawaii and would be unable to film episodes.

In July 2025, Hofstetter was announced as the new co-host to Wine About It with QTCinderella.

=== RFLCT and controversy ===
On October 19, 2021, Hofstetter announced the launch of her skincare brand, RFLCT. The brand, primarily geared towards gamers and those who put in heavy screen time, claimed that users are susceptible to skin damage caused by prolonged exposure to blue light and that their products protect against it.

RFLCT received backlash due to insufficient evidence supporting the claim; according to Kathleen Suozzi, the director of the aesthetic dermatology program at Yale University, unless someone was already prone to melasma or hyperpigmentation, they were unlikely to suffer any consequence of sitting in front of a screen for long periods of time. Hofstetter responded by stating that "all of the hate, doubt, concerns, and criticisms are all warranted and valid" and that she was "very upset and confused" with the lack of information on its website, promising additional information supporting the products would be made available. She was later informed that the research conducted by RFLCT supporting the products—which she had been given access to during development—could not be released to the public.

Hofstetter then expressed a desire to part ways with RFLCT but was contractually bound. On October 30, 2021, RFLCT ceased operation of its website and online store. A statement on the website read: "While we believe in the formulations created, after further reflection, have decided to move forward on new paths, effectively terminating the RFLCT brand."

== Personal life ==
Hofstetter resides in Los Angeles. From 2016 to 2021, she was in a relationship with fellow streamer Michael "Sonii" Sherman. From April 2023 to July 2024, she lived with fellow streamers Leslie "Fuslie" Fu, Miyoung "Kkatamina" Kim, Sykkuno, Christina "TinaKitten" Kenyon, and Yvonne "Yvonnie" Ng ,collectively known as "The Roomies".

Her father died in April 2017 from cancer; she had paid for his hospice care and took care of him in his final weeks. Her half-brother on her father's side, Mark, died on February 19, 2026, after suffering from an alcohol addiction; Hofstetter stated that they never had a good relationship as they had become estranged since their father's death and conveyed to her followers that she felt resentment towards him for how he had treated her mom and sister. Hofstetter faced backlash and support for her comments on her brother. Her nephew, one of her paternal half-brother's sons, then passed away at the age of 32 on October 11, 2026; Hofstetter had to abruptly end a gaming stream to grieve.

Throughout her career, Hofstetter has shown support for women's rights in the gaming community, the pro-choice movement, LGBTQ+ rights, Palestine during the Gaza war, opposed the mass deportations of immigrants in the United States, and endorsed Kamala Harris in the 2024 United States presidential election.

== Filmography ==
=== Film ===
List of film roles
Year	Title	Role	Notes	Ref.
2023	The Family Plan	Herself		
2025	Goldbeak	Ratchet	Voice role (English dub); direct-to-video	
2026	Iron Lung	Additional voices	Voice role	

=== Television ===
Year	Title	Role	Notes	Ref.
2022	Tribe Nine	Hannya Squad Member	Voice role (English dub); episode: "Chiyoda Tribe Showdown"	
2022	Sonic Prime	Squad Commander Red	Voice role; episode: "Situation: Grim"	
2025	Inside: USA	Co-Host	Co-Host with Fanum; Season 1	

=== Music videos ===
List of music videos
Year	Title	Artist(s)	Ref.
2021	"DayWalker"	Machine Gun Kelly and Corpse Husband	
2021	"Build a Bitch"	Bella Poarch	
2021	"Inferno"	Bella Poarch and Sub Urban	
2022	"Car Crash"	eaJ	
2022	"Memories"	Yungblud and Willow Smith	
2022	"Dolls"	Bella Poarch	
2024	"Echoes"	Valkyrae, Fuslie and Ylona Garcia	
2024	"Run Back to You"	Lay Zhang and Lauv	
2024	"Girls"	The Kid Laroi	
2024	"Drag Me Under"	Blessthefall and Alpha Wolf	
2025	"Forever"	Blaire	

== Discography ==
List of singles, showing year released and album name
Title	Year	Album	Ref.
"The Fortnite Rap Battle Round 2" (NerdOut featuring Valkyrae, TimTheTatman, SypherPK, Nate Hill and AvaGG)	2018	Non-album singles	
"Last Cup of Coffee" (with Natsumiii, featuring LilyPichu)	2021	Non-album singles	
"Echoes" (with Fuslie and Ylona Garcia)	2024	Non-album singles	

== Awards and nominations ==
List of awards and nominations received by Valkyrae
Ceremony	Year	Category	Result	Ref.
Adweek Creator Visionary Awards	2021	Gaming Creator of the Year	Won	
The Game Awards	2020	Content Creator of the Year	Won	
Shorty Awards	2019	Gaming	Nominated	
The Esports Awards	2021	Streamer of the Year	Nominated	
The Esports Awards	2022	Streamer of the Year	Nominated	
The Streamer Awards	2021	Best Variety Streamer	Nominated	
The Streamer Awards	2023	The Sapphire Award	Won	
The Streamer Awards	2024	The Sapphire Award	Nominated	
The Streamer Awards	2026	Best Content Group (Note: Shared with F.S.L.R.)	Nominated	
Streamy Awards	2021	Livestreamer	Won	
Streamy Awards	2022	Streamer of the Year	Nominated	
Streamy Awards	2022	Variety Streamer	Nominated	
Streamy Awards	2023	Streamer of the Year	Nominated	
Streamy Awards	2023	Variety Streamer	Nominated	

=== Listicles ===
Publisher	Year	Listicle	Result	Ref.
Forbes	2022	30 Under 30: Games	Placed	
Gold House	2024	A100	Honoree	
Time	2026	Time100 Creators	Titan	

== See also ==
- List of YouTubers
