= Michael Reeves (internet personality) =

American YouTuber (born 1997)

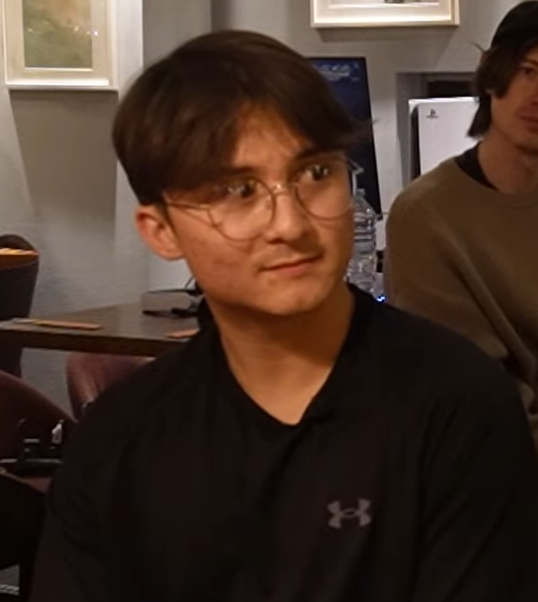
- Reeves in 2025
- Born: November 20, 1997 (age 28); Maui, Hawaii, U.S.
- Occupations: YouTuber; Twitch streamer
- Organization: OfflineTV
- Partner: Lily Ki (2020–present)

Twitch information
- Channel: michaelreeves
- Years active: 2020–present
- Genres: Gaming; Chatting
- Followers: 1.4 million

YouTube information
- Channel: Michael Reeves
- Genres: Technology; Robotics; Programming; Vlog; Comedy
- Subscribers: 7.78 million
- Views: 511 million
- Last updated: April 14, 2026

Michael Reeves (born November 20, 1997) is an American YouTuber and Twitch streamer who produces "comedy-tech" YouTube videos. He is a member of OfflineTV, an online social entertainment group of content creators.

== Early life ==
Reeves was born to an American father and a Filipino mother. He grew up on the Hawaiian island of Maui. Reeves struggled academically and directed his energy instead towards teaching himself to code. He briefly attended Northern Arizona University upon graduating high school but dropped out to focus on work, securing a job as a software contractor for the Hawaiian government.

== Career ==
While Reeves was attending Northern Arizona University, he released his first video on YouTube, The Robot That Shines a Laser in Your Eye, had gone viral. His subsequent videos included a Roomba that swore upon colliding with a wall, a taser camera that shocked its subjects, a Twitter bot that purchased items from the replies that received the most likes, and a modification of Boston Dynamics's robot dog Spot that urinated beer into a cup on command. In September 2018, Reeves moved from Hawaii to Los Angeles to pursue YouTube full time. Newsweek described Reeves as an "internet edge lord and coding genius".

In December 2019, it was announced that Reeves had joined OfflineTV, a collective of Twitch streamers creating content and living together in Los Angeles, California. In his first video with the group, Reeves created an iteration of laser tag titled "tazer tag" where players get shocked by a taser after being shot.

In June 2020, Reeves began streaming on Twitch, where he streams both video games and technology work. His debut stream attracted over 30,000 concurrent viewers.

With the financial support of a sponsor, OfflineTV purchased the canine-inspired robotic platform Spot from Boston Dynamics in late 2020. It has featured in several videos on both OfflineTV and Reeves' channel.

In May 2022, as part of the charity boxing event "Creator Clash" hosted by iDubbbz, Reeves participated in a boxing match against fellow content creator Graham Stephan. Reeves won the bout by TKO in the second of five rounds.

In 2024, Reeves made his voice acting debut in the video game Another Crab's Treasure.

In March 2025, Reeves and fellow YouTuber Ludwig Ahgren traveled across Japan while uploading daily vlogs as a challenge, traveling on motorcycles without the use of smartphones, maps, or expressways. The duo began at Cape Sata, the southernmost point of Japan, and reached Cape Soya, the northernmost point, fourteen days later. In 2026, Ahgren and Reeves followed up their motorcycle vlogs with a journey across China. During the trip, the two inadvertently intruded on a funeral in a rural village in Shaoyang (Mandarin: 花桥村) having mistaken the banquet for a restaurant. A relative of the deceased said the village had seldom received foreign visitors.

== Personal life ==
In September 2018, Reeves moved to Los Angeles and began rooming with fellow comedy-tech YouTuber William Osman. In February 2020, Reeves announced that he was dating fellow OfflineTV member, LilyPichu.

== Boxing career ==
Boxing record

1 fight	1 win	0 losses
By knockout	1	0

No.	Result	Record	Opponent	Type	Round, time	Date	Location	Notes
1	Win	1–0	Graham Stephan	TKO	2 (5), 1:45	May 14, 2022	Yuengling Center, Tampa, Florida, US	

== Filmography ==
=== Music videos ===
Year	Title	Artist(s)	Role	Notes	Ref.
2021	"Break Out"	MaiR	Himself	OfflineTV's official animated music video	
2025	"Sherbet Sky"	LilyPichu	Himself	Helped with recording and editing	

=== Video games ===
Year	Title	Role	Notes	Ref.
2024	Another Crab's Treasure	Firth, Prawnathan/Loan Shark	Reeves' video game acting debut	

== Discography ==
=== Singles ===
Year	Title	Artist(s)	Credit	Ref.
2021	"Last Cup of Coffee"	LilyPichu	Provided saxophone	
2024	"Into Dust"	LilyPichu	Provided saxophone	
2025	"Sherbet Sky"	LilyPichu	Provided vocals	

== Accolades ==
Year	Award	Category	Nominated work	Result	Ref.
2020	Streamy Awards	Technology	Michael Reeves	Nominated	
2021	Streamy Awards	Branded Video	Building A Laser Baby – Amazon Prime Video	Won	
2026	The Streamer Awards	Best Creative Arts Streamer	Himself	Pending	
