= Sykkuno =

American YouTuber and live streamer (born 1991)

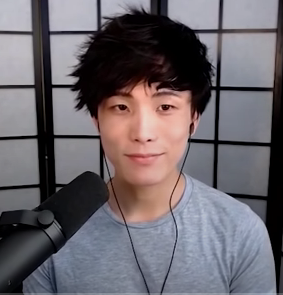
- Sykkuno in 2020
- Born: June 4, 1991 (age 35)
- Occupation: Streamer

Twitch information
- Channel: Sykkuno
- Years active: 2019–2022; 2024–present
- Followers: 3.8 million

YouTube information
- Channel: Sykkuno
- Years active: 2011–present
- Genre: Gaming
- Subscribers: 2.66 million
- Views: 522 million
- Last updated: April 23, 2026

Sykkuno (/ˌsaɪˈkuːnoʊ/ SY-KOON-oh; born June 4, 1991) is an American YouTuber and live streamer. He is best known for his live streams, which are hosted on Twitch. He also streamed exclusively on YouTube from May 2022 to May 2024. Sykkuno plays several video games, including PEAK, League of Legends, Animal Crossing: New Horizons, Among Us, Valorant, and Minecraft.

== Early life ==
Sykkuno's first name is Thomas. He was born on June 4, 1991, in Southern California.

== Career ==
=== 2011–2019: Early career ===
Sykkuno began creating video content for the online game League of Legends in 2011 on YouTube. He started his YouTube career by posting commentary and gameplay on an older channel named "Sykku" before creating a newer channel, "Sykkuno", in 2012. The newer YouTube channel would later become the main channel where he would continue posting videos, which today consist of clips and compilations of his Twitch streams.

=== 2019–2024: Rise in popularity and move to YouTube ===
While his Twitch account has been active since November 14, 2011, Sykkuno began streaming regularly in April 2019 after being convinced to do so by fellow streamer and OfflineTV member LilyPichu. He quickly gained popularity on the platform, with many attributing his calm, wholesome, laid-back demeanor as a factor. Sykkuno continued to post videos and content primarily related to League of Legends until shifting to make content on other online games, such as Among Us and Grand Theft Auto V, with fellow content creators of the gaming community. While Sykkuno posted commentary game videos, he did not show his face until he started streaming with a webcam on Twitch in February 2020.

In April 2021, Sykkuno participated in an hour-long charity Among Us stream on The Tonight Show with Jimmy Fallon, members of The Roots, fellow streamers Valkyrae and Corpse Husband, and Stranger Things actors Gaten Matarazzo and Noah Schnapp, with proceeds going towards Feeding America. Later in September 2021, Sykkuno hosted an impromptu subathon stream on his Twitch channel. His final Twitch stream before switching to YouTube took place on April 30, 2022. In May 2022, Sykkuno announced that he would be leaving Twitch for an exclusive streaming contract on YouTube. He signed with United Talent Agency for representation in August 2022.

=== 2024–present: Return to Twitch ===
In May 2024, Sykkuno returned to streaming on Twitch after his contract with YouTube expired. In October 2024, Sykkuno participated in an hour-long Discord call livestreamed on Bernie Sanders' YouTube channel. The participants were Bernie Sanders, Mark Hamill, Sykkuno, Pokimane, Mark Cuban, Valkyrae, AustinShow, Hasan Piker, Thew Parkvisal and Austin Evans. In April 2026, Sykkuno took an indefinite hiatus from streaming following allegations of engaging in deceptive romantic behavior, including maintaining a long-term relationship while presenting himself as single, leading to overlapping relationships and undisclosed interactions. He returned to streaming in June 2026.

== Personal life ==
Sykkuno is of Chinese and Vietnamese descent. He has two sisters. In April 2026, he confirmed that he is currently in a relationship following allegations of hiding a long-term girlfriend.

=== Relationship controversy ===
On April 10, 2026, streamer and VTuber HemomalVT released a document accusing Sykkuno of engaging in deceptive romantic behavior, including maintaining a long-term relationship while presenting himself as single, leading to overlapping relationships and undisclosed interactions. Other creators, including Dotty, NamiKitsunami, and Leia, came forward and shared similar claims. On April 16, Sykkuno and his girlfriend issued a joint statement confirming his unfaithfulness and misrepresentation, expressing regret, disputing some claims, and announcing an indefinite break from streaming to address personal matters. He returned to streaming in June 2026.

== Filmography ==
=== Anime ===
Year	Title	Role	Notes	Ref.
2022	Tribe Nine	Twin	Episode 11, English dub	

=== Music videos ===
Year	Title	Artist(s)	Role	Notes	Ref.
2022	"Dolls"	Bella Poarch	Makeup Stylist	Sykkuno is seen at 1 minute and 11 seconds.	

== Awards and nominations ==
Year	Ceremony	Category	Result	Ref.
2021	The Streamer Awards	Best GTA Roleplay Streamer	Nominated	
2021	The Streamer Awards	Streamer of the Year	Nominated	

== See also ==
- List of most-followed Twitch channels
