= Crow Point =

Crow Point may refer to

- Crow Point in England, at the southern end of Braunton Burrows, on the Taw-Torridge Estuary in North Devon
- Crow Point in America, at the entrance to Hingham Harbor, Massachusetts

== See also ==
- PointCrow, an American internet personality born in 1998
