= Tribe Nine =

Japanese multimedia franchise

- Key image
- Genre: Sports (Baseball)
- Created by: Too Kyo Games; Kazutaka Kodaka; Shūhei Yamaguchi
- Anime television series
- Directed by: Yū Aoki
- Written by: Michiko Yokote
- Music by: Masafumi Takada
- Studio: Liden Films
- Licensed by: Crunchyroll (Note: formerly Funimation): SA/SEA: Medialink
- Original network: Tokyo MX, BS11, TV Aichi, SUN
- Original run: January 10, 2022 – March 28, 2022
- Episodes: 12
- Video game
- Developer: Too Kyo Games; Akatsuki
- Publisher: Akatsuki
- Music by: Masafumi Takada
- Genre: Action role-playing
- Platform: Android, iOS, Windows
- Released: February 20, 2025
- icon

Tribe Nine (stylized in all caps) is a Japanese multimedia franchise created by Kazutaka Kodaka of Too Kyo Games. It consists of an action role-playing game by Too Kyo Games and Akatsuki, which was released in February 2025, and an anime television series by Liden Films, which aired from January to March 2022. A webtoon and stage play were also announced.

== Plot ==
Tribe Nine takes place in a dystopian future ("The Year 20XX") where disaffected youths form their own Tribes that soon turn violent and run rampant across the city of Neo-Tokyo. To contain the violence, the government of Neo-Tokyo implements the "XB Law", stating that all future conflicts between Tribes will be settled through games of "Extreme Baseball", overseen by robotic umpires. The games are similar to baseball except there are fewer restrictions on equipment, the "field" can be as big as an entire ward, and the only ways to get an Out require striking out the batter or tagging out a baserunner while holding the ball. Games can also end if the opposing team is rendered unable to continue playing the game.

== Characters ==
=== Minato Tribe ===
The protagonists' faction, based in the special ward of Minato, Tokyo. Their base is a diner that rarely gets customers. Their leader, Shun Kamiya, is considered one of the best XB players in all of Neo-Tokyo.

Haru Shirokane (白金ハル, Shirokane Haru)
Voiced by: Shun Horie (Japanese); Casey Mongillo (English)
Shun Kamiya (神谷瞬, Kamiya Shun)
Voiced by: Akira Ishida (Japanese); Jacob Hopkins (English)
Taiga (タイガ, Taiga)
Voiced by: Chiharu Sawashiro (Japanese); Phillip Sacramento (English)
Saori Arisugawa (有栖川さおり, Arisugawa Saori)
Voiced by: Mai Fuchigami (Japanese); Brittney Karbowski (English)
Santarō Mita (三田三太郎, Mita Santarō)
Voiced by: Mutsumi Tamura (Japanese); Kevin Thelwell (English)
Manami Daimon (大門愛海, Daimon Manami)
Voiced by: Fukushi Ochiai (Japanese); Brendan Blaber (English)
Kazuki Aoyama (青山カズキ, Aoyama Kazuki)
Voiced by: Shōya Chiba (Japanese); John Van Doren (English)

=== Chiyoda Tribe ===
The main antagonistic faction of Tribe Nine. Based out of the special ward of Chiyoda, home to the Imperial Palace and Diet Building, the Chiyoda Tribe considers themselves the seat of power over Neo-Tokyo as well, ruling from a floating palace. Though the only named XB player in Chiyoda is Ōjirō Ōtori, he is capable of defeating entire Tribes single-handedly.

Tenshin Ōtori (鳳天心, Ōtori Tenshin)
Voiced by: Hiroshi Naka (Japanese); Michael Sorich (English)
Ōjirō Ōtori (鳳王次郎, Ōtori Ōjirō)
Voiced by: Junichi Suwabe (Japanese); Corpse Husband (English)
Yui Kamiki (神木結衣, Kamiki Yui)
Voiced by: Mikako Komatsu (Japanese); Amber Lee Connors (English)

=== Adachi Tribe ===
A wild, stubborn biker gang of a Tribe based out of the special ward of Adachi who use an old enclosed shopping arcade as their home field. Led by the gutsy Hyakutarō Senju, who literally sets his bat and ball on fire and tries to win through sheer power and determination.

Hyakutarō Senju (千住百太郎, Senju Hyakutarō)
Voiced by: Kentarō Kumagai (Japanese); Gianni Matragrano (English)
Rankichi Umeda (梅田蘭吉, Umeda Rankichi)
Voiced by: Toshiki Masuda (Japanese); Mark Allen Jr. (English)
Tatsuto Tatsunuma (辰沼龍斗, Tatsunuma Tatsuto)
Voiced by: Shunsuke Takeuchi (Japanese); Bradley Gareth (English)

=== Taito Tribe ===
A relatively laid-back Tribe based out of the Taitō ward. Its members prefer art and romance to fighting other Tribes, but have their own tactics to use against opponents who underestimate them. Taito's leaders operate out of a large pagoda.

Yajirobe Ueno (上野弥次郎兵衛, Ueno Yajirobe)
Voiced by: Yuichi Nakamura (Japanese); Tom Laflin (English)
Hanafuda Sakura (桜花札, Sakura Hanafuda)
Voiced by: Daisuke Ono (Japanese); Kamran Nikhad (English)

=== Ota Tribe ===
A poor Tribe based out of Ōta that cares less about XB and more about causing chaos and destruction wherever they go. What they lack in skill, they make up in dirty tactics. Their leader, Fucho Sonoda, is constantly under assault by other tribe members that threaten to take his head, and he violently crushes them to maintain his position.

Fucho Sonoda (園田不兆, Sonoda Fuchō)
Voiced by: Junta Terashima (Japanese); Samuel Drake (English)
Enoki Yukigaya (雪谷えのき, Yukigaya Enoki)
Voiced by: Reina Kondō (Japanese); Kayli Mills (English)
Kiyoshiro Haneda (羽田清死郎, Haneda Kiyoshirō)
Voiced by: Yukihiro Nozuyama (Japanese); Zach Aguilar (English)
Roku Saigo (西郷ロク, Saigō Roku)
Voiced by: Kenichirou Matsuda (Japanese); Cyrus Rodas (English)
Kai Asahikawa (旭川カイ, Asahikawa Kai)
Voiced by: Gakuto Kajiwara (Japanese); Mike Haimoto (English)

=== Shinagawa Tribe ===
Based out of the Shinagawa special ward, this Tribe prides itself on developing XB equipment to surpass the limits of what players can physically do on their own.

Yutaka Gotanda (五反田豊, Gotanda Yutaka)
Voiced by: Wataru Komada (Japanese); Valentine Stokes (English)
Minami Oi (大井南, Ōi Minami)
Voiced by: Misato Murai (Japanese); Caitlyn Elizabeth (English)

=== Setagaya Tribe ===
Based out of the Setagaya special ward, this Tribe is led by Eiji Todoroki, who thinks that he can buy anything with enough money, from bikini-clad women to victories in XB.

Eiji Todoroki (轟英二, Todoroki Eiji)
Voiced by: Kensho Ono (Japanese); Alexander Gross (English)

Various streamers have made cameo appearances in the series' English dub, including CDawgVA, MoistCr1tikal, Disguised Toast, Sykkuno, Technoblade, Valkyrae, and Yong Yea.

== Media ==
=== Video game ===
The video game was first announced in February 2020, with Too Kyo Games developing and Akatsuki also developing and publishing. Two days later, the first trailer was released. In September 2021, it was revealed the game would be a 3D action role-playing game for smartphones. A trailer was released in June 2024, revealing the game would be released on Android, iOS, and Windows. Tribe Nine was released on February 20, 2025. The game ended its service on November 27, 2025, primarily attributed to low revenue and poor player retention.

==== Doujin continuation ====
On August 1, 2025, following the news of the game prematurely ending its services, Kazutaka Kodaka announced on social media that the rest of the story will be told as a free, non-profit Japanese doujin series helmed by Kodaka, Shuhei Yamaguchi, and Katsunori Sugninaka through their doujin circle "Neo Neon Tribe". The group aims to complete the story through a web novel, while also working on sequels to untold stories and reconstructing existing ones to expand the world of Tribe Nine through unofficial, non-profit, derivative works, with the blessings and the approval of Akatsuki Games.

=== Anime ===
In September 2021, an anime television series for the franchise was announced. It is produced by Liden Films and directed by Yū Aoki, with Michiko Yokote writing the script, Rui Komatsuzaki and Simadoriru designing the characters and Yosuke Yabumoto adapting the designs for animation, and Masafumi Takada composing the music. It aired from January 10 to March 28, 2022, on Tokyo MX and other networks. Miyavi performed the series' opening theme, titled "Strike It Out", while Void_Chords feat. LIO performed the ending theme, "Infocus". Funimation co-produced the series and streamed it on their service outside of Asia. Medialink licensed the series in Southeast Asia, South Asia, and Oceania except for Australia and New Zealand.

==== Episode list ====
No.	Title	Directed by (Note: Information is taken from the ending credits of each episode.)	Written by	Storyboarded by	Original release date
1	"It Takes Guts"; Transliteration: "Tamashī Kakete" (Japanese: 魂かけて)	Yūki Ikeda	Michiko Yokote	Yū Aoki	January 10, 2022
Haru Shirokane and Taiga are saved from a group of delinquents by the strongest Extreme Baseball (XB) player and leader of the Minato Tribe, Shun Kamiya. Despite calling him boring, Kamiya invites Haru to his XB team with Taiga joining too. Suddenly, the Shinagawa Tribe's leader, Yutaka Gotanda, marches into Minato's hideout to challenge them to an XB match with their highly-developed XB gear. Shun decides to press Haru and Taiga into service immediately, giving them a crash course on the rules of XB, as Minato defeats Shinagawa by knocking out their leader.
2	"The Destroyer"; Transliteration: "Kowashiya" (Japanese: 壊し屋)	Yasushi Tomoda	Michiko Yokote	Yū Aoki	January 17, 2022
Shun tests Haru and Taiga's skills and trains them in a practice match, while Saori talks about Shun's backstory, and expands on the rules of XB and how it differs from normal baseball. After finishing their training, the Minato Tribe is suddenly challenged to a real game of XB by the Chiyoda Tribe's star player, Ojiro Otori.
3	"A Real Enemy"; Transliteration: "Hontō no Teki" (Japanese: 本当の敵)	Tatsuji Yamazaki	Michiko Yokote	Yū Aoki	January 24, 2022
The Chiyoda Tribe challenges the Minato Tribe to XB in their quest to crush all the other Tribes of Neo-Tokyo. During the match, Ojiro personally confronts Shun, leaving him severely wounded as Minato decides to forfeit the match to treat Shun. Despite Minato Tribe's defeat, the members keep socializing. However, Shun's health deteriorates and he later dies outside the diner.
4	"Without Him..."; Transliteration: "Aitsu ga Inakerya" (Japanese: アイツがいなけりゃ)	Tatsuya Shiraishi	Michiko Yokote	Yū Aoki	January 31, 2022
The Minato Tribe struggles to continue on after losing both their last match and Shun's life. However, Minato barely has time to mourn when Saori is kidnapped by a biker gang, the Adachi Tribe, and forced to play a game of XB on Adachi's turf to rescue her. Adachi's home "field" is set in a large shopping mall, full of enclosed spaces and alleyways that make finding the ball and the bases difficult for Minato. In addition, the Adachi Tribe are able to use their motorcycles as "spikes" within the rules of XB, making it difficult to evade them or tag them out in time. After Minato goes down by several runs early, a mysterious blue-haired boy with a broken arm offers his help to the team. He uses his intellect to help Minato counter Adachi's home field advantage, and introduces himself as Kazuki Aoyama.
5	"What I Wanted To See"; Transliteration: "Mitakatta Mono" (Japanese: 見たかったモノ)	Kōtarō Miyake	Michiko Yokote	Yū Aoki	February 7, 2022
Kazuki slowly begins to turn the odds back in Minato's favor, but Haru and Taiga find his tactics dishonorable and argue with him during a break in play. Next inning, the Adachi leader Hyakutaro Senju sets his bat on fire and hits the ball. Taiga ignores Kazuki's advice and tries to fight Hyakutaro one-on-one, but loses. Next inning, Hyakutaro sets the ball on fire and pitches a literal fire ball at Haru, but Haru struggles to handle Shun's bat. Suddenly, Saori shows up, having escaped captivity, and gives Haru the moral support to get a base hit. With Saori rescued, Kazuki wants to throw the game and leave, but Saori pinch-hits for him and smashes the fire ball out of the arcade. Adachi decides to suspend the match as Saori reveals that the entire kidnapping was just Adachi's heavy way of encouraging Minato not to give up on XB just because Shun is gone. Afterwards, Adachi speeds off to challenge Chiyoda.
6	"A Man's Pride"; Transliteration: "Otoko no Iji" (Japanese: 男の意地)	Michiru Itabisashi	Rintarō Ikeda	Yū Aoki	February 14, 2022
Minato tries to stop Adachi from fighting against Chiyoda, but the biker gang is too stubborn to give up even as Ojiro single-handedly destroys them and drills Hyakutaro with a pitch. With the entire team unable to continue, Chiyoda wins. Afterwards, Taiga tries to train himself to be a better XB player, but struggles to hit even slow pitches. Kazuki tells him of another XB player who can train him even faster, Hanafuda Sakura of the Taito Tribe. Taiga immediately heads to a large pagoda in Taito and repeatedly begs Hanafuda to train him, but the man constantly refuses. Eventually, Hanafuda gives Taiga a challenge to hit one pitch of his without striking out. Despite rigging the challenge by pretending to throw the ball and watching Taiga swing at nothing, Taiga manages to win by swinging the bat so hard he creates a burst of wind that knocks the ball out of Hanafuda's hand.
7	"Tribe-Packed XB Tourney"; Transliteration: "Doki! Toraibu-darake no Ekkusu Bī Taikai" (Japanese: ドキッ!トライブだらけの XB 大会)	Yasushi Tomoda	Rintarō Ikeda	Yū Aoki	February 21, 2022
Hanafuda abandons Taiga at a shack on the outskirts of Taito, demanding he swing a giant log 100,000 times each day for a week for his "training." Back at Minato's HQ, Haru notices someone trying to steal his beam bat and chases him off, but runs into Kazuki petting some cats. Haru then keeps a close eye on his bat, suspecting Kazuki to be the masked thief. A bit later, Kazuki carries a flyer for a batting contest sponsored by the ultra-wealthy Eiji Todoroki of the Setagaya Tribe promising 10 Million Yen to the winner. The Minato Tribe easily wins the contest, but Kazuki soon reveals that the entire event was just a ruse for Eiji to "buy" the beam bat from Haru, and that he was the thief from earlier. Despite Eiji's offer to raise the price and even make Haru a member of Satagaya, Haru refuses to sell the bat. As the Minato Tribe heads back home, Eiji throws a tantrum before accidentally setting off a bomb planted by the Ota Tribe to cover their tracks after stealing some of Eiji's gold. Back at Ota's base, Chiyoda Tribe's Yui Kamiki hands their leader, Fucho Sonoda, a suitcase full of money to kill Kazuki.
8	"Let the Chaos Begin"; Transliteration: "Kaosu no Makuake" (Japanese: カオスの幕開け)	Hiroshi Kimura	Rintarō Ikeda	Yū Aoki	February 28, 2022
The Ota Tribe begins assaulting Kazuki and his friends with explosives and vehicles as Yasuhiro helps Kazuki and Haru escape. XB robot umpires show up to enforce the XB Law before Ota can cause any more damage, so Fucho reluctantly agrees to play a match while Yasuhiro joins Minato to play on their team. Fucho is mostly uninterested in the game, as Minato racks up 100 runs on the outmatched Ota Tribe, and instead wants to kill Kazuki. When a robot umpire stops him from attacking, Fucho directs Enoki to activate a device that jams the robots, allowing him to use illegal weapons on the Minato players. In a nearby warehouse Yasuhiro attacks Haru with a knife, saying he thought joining the Ota Tribe would make him tougher, but they just strapped a bomb to him and used him as a hostage. Kazuki saves Haru by knocking out Yasuhiro and revealing the bomb was fake, but then Fucho reveals to Haru that Kazuki was just using him and the Minato Tribe to get revenge on Ojiro and the Chiyoda Tribe for breaking his arm and tossing him aside years ago, despite being Ojiro's adopted brother.
9	"Walk-off Win"; Transliteration: "Gyakuten Sayonara" (Japanese: 逆転サヨナラ)	Tatsuya Shiraishi	Rintarō Ikeda	Yū Aoki	March 7, 2022
Taiga rushes all the way back to Minato from Taito to fight off Fucho and hits a home run to demonstrate his newfound power of swinging so hard he creates a vacuum around the bat that will launch the ball no matter where he swings. With the robot umpires still jammed, Fucho calls in multiple trucks full of Ota Tribesmen to run across home plate and score runs for him. Haru and Taiga rush over to the rooftop where the jammer was placed and shut it down, but Ota has scored 102 runs before order is restored, putting them ahead by one. Despite only having one usable arm, Kazuki manages to get on base, and Haru uses the beam bat to hit a walk-off home run. After the XB match, Fucho decides to gamble with his life against Kazuki, but pushes a button that blows himself up. Back at Minato's HQ, Enoki has decided to stay in Minato, both for the food and her new one-sided obsession with Taiga. Kazuki decides to leave Minato after using the Tribe as pawns in his scheme, but Saori and the others in the Minato Tribe forgive him and welcome him back. Meanwhile, in Chiyoda's floating base, Tenshin Otori tries to acquire Ota's robot jamming technology, saying he'll do whatever it takes to win, even rewrite the XB Law to suit himself. Ojiro then kills him, calling him "despicable."
10	"Declaration of War"; Transliteration: "Sensen Fukoku" (Japanese: 宣戦布告)	Kiyoshi Murayama; Kana Kawana	Michiko Yokote	Yū Aoki	March 14, 2022
After killing his father, Ojiro becomes the new ruler of Neo-Tokyo, and decides to rewrite the XB Laws to roll back restrictions on violence and equipment within the games, and furthermore state that XB challenges can no longer be refused without a forfeit. Whoever loses must obey the winner's order without question. A few days later, despite the rapid increase in injuries and even deaths under the new XB, the game rapidly increases in popularity, with new money and stadiums being raised to support the game. Yui delivers Ojiro's ultimatum to the Minato Tribe to prepare for another XB match the following night, where he plans to finish them off. The Minato Tribe members all question if they can fight, and win, under the new XB rules. Eventually, they decide to respond to Ojiro's challenge and face him to restore XB back to the less-violent rules.
11	"Chiyoda Tribe Showdown"; Transliteration: "Kessen! Chiyoda Toraibu" (Japanese: 決戦！チヨダトライブ)	Hitomi Ezoe	Michiko Yokote	Yū Aoki	March 21, 2022
Yui decides to challenge Minato with her own team of elite Chiyoda XB players to see if Minato is "worthy" of fighting Ojiro. Multiple Minato players get injured early in the game, until the leaders of Adachi and Shinagawa sub themselves in and help Minato even out their strength. Yui decides to take the field herself, using her jet-powered legs to kick the ball as both pitcher and hitter, breaking through her enemy's bats and equipment when they try to stop her. Yui then ends up in a fight with Fucho of the Ota Tribe, who decided it would be chaotic to take on Chiyoda himself, but Yui defeats him and Kazuki. After crossing home plate, Yui mocks Minato's idealism, when Taito Tribe shows up and Hanafuda decides to pinch-hit using a smoking pipe. Hanafuda manages to hit the ball and rip off one of Yui's greaves, but Yui shoots him with a hidden pistol. Before Yui can finish him off, Ojiro descends onto the field himself.
12	"PLAY BALL"	Yūki Ikeda	Michiko Yokote	Yū Aoki	March 28, 2022
Ojiro dismisses Yui from his service for her cowardly actions and decides to face Minato's team himself. A scorned Yui retaliates by infiltrating the facility that keeps Chiyoda's palace floating and sabotages it. As the Imperial Palace begins crashing down onto Neo-Tokyo, Haru gets a hit off Ojiro's pitch, and starts running the bases with Taiga and Kazuki backing him up against Ojiro. Meanwhile, the action is interspersed with flashbacks showing Kazuki and Ojiro's past, training together under Tenshin Otori's program to raise the strongest XB player. Kazuki even unleashes his left arm from its cast to fight Ojiro, but it is still not fully healed. Haru nears home plate and fights Ojiro one-on-one as a large chunk of the palace crashes near them. The following day, Ojiro is missing from the rubble, and the Chiyoda Tribe is considered disbanded with no one to rule over the survivors. XB soon reverts to the previous rules as Minato gets ready to play another game.

=== Webtoon ===
A webtoon adaptation of the franchise was announced in September 2021.

== Reception ==
The anime series' first episode garnered positive reviews from Anime News Network's staff during the Winter 2022 season previews. James Beckett wrote that "Tribe Nine is stupid, fun, colorful, and it made me smile a whole lot. This officially makes it a Good Anime That You Should Watch. No further questions at this time." Nicholas Dupree called it a "light and breezy premiere" that told its solid and quirky baseball story with striking character designs and "high-octane spectacle" but felt it was held back by its "clearly modest production". Richard Eisenbeis was also critical of the animation not showcasing the baseball scenes and character designs to its fullest, but concluded that: "[T]his first episode is 100% style over substance and it's a blast to watch. Now, will said style alone be able to carry the show as it goes on? Probably not. But I'll certainly be watching to find out." Conversely, Rebecca Silverman criticized the over-the-top premise for lacking a "touch of logic" to make it grounded and the constant bullying of Haru to get involved in the game.

Fellow ANN reviewer Monique Thomas chose Tribe Nine as her pick for the Worst Anime of Winter 2022, feeling disappointed by the "extremely limited" production making the art style and baseball scenes "stiff and boring", and the overall cast and XB world coming across as "barebones", concluding that: "It's not the complete worst, if anything I'd overall describe it as "mid," but compared to everything else I was watching, Tribe Nine struck out." Kim Morrissy chose the series as her pick for the Worst Anime of 2022, calling it a "more subdued affair" compared to Akudama Drive that squanders its opening episodes to become "an extremely average sports anime", concluding that "Tribe Nine was far from the year's worst anime, but it was unbearably mid."
