= Corpse Husband =

American YouTuber and musician (born 1997)

- Official avatar of Corpse Husband
- Born: August 8, 1997 (age 29); San Diego, California, U.S.
- Other name: CORPSE
- Occupations: YouTuber; musician

YouTube information
- Channel: Corpse Husband
- Subscribers: 7.08 million
- Views: 338.8 million
- Last updated: December 15, 2025

Corpse Husband (born August 8, 1997), commonly abbreviated as Corpse and stylized in all caps, is an American musician and former YouTuber. Corpse is best known for his music and "faceless" work on YouTube. He is mostly known for his horror story narration and Among Us content. He also gained notable recognition for his deep low-pitched voice.

== Early life ==
Corpse was born on August 8, 1997, in San Diego, California.

== Career ==
In 2015, Corpse began his career on YouTube by narrating horror stories on his channel, which he did consecutively until 2020. He made his musical debut in 2016, being featured on the single "Grim Grinning Ghosts" by record producer The Living Tombstone and musical artist CrusherP.

On March 6, 2020, Corpse released his debut single "Miss You!", which peaked at number 31 on the Hot Rock & Alternative Songs chart. His follow-up single "White Tee", which was released in the same month, reached number 32 on the same chart. In September 2020, Corpse began streaming and creating content on the video game Among Us, which brought him much recognition, and has since gained over 7 million subscribers on YouTube. In the same month, he released the single "E-Girls Are Ruining My Life!", featuring vocals from rapper Savage Ga$p, which generated widespread commercial success for Corpse in 2020. The song charted at 28 in Bulgaria, 90 on the UK Singles Chart, and 24 in Billboard's Bubbling Under Hot 100 chart. It also reached more than 100 million streams on Spotify, and was ranked second on Spotify's Viral 50 songs chart. In 2022, it became his first track to be certified platinum by the Recording Industry Association of America.

In October 2020, Corpse worked with U.S. representatives Alexandria Ocasio-Cortez and Ilhan Omar along with several other notable streamers including Disguised Toast, MoistCr1tikal and Pokimane for a session of Among Us as part of a get out the vote initiative for the 2020 United States presidential election. The same month, he released the single "Agoraphobic", which debuted at number 21 on the Hot Rock & Alternative Songs chart four months later.

In March 2021, Corpse was featured on Machine Gun Kelly's song "Daywalker!". On March 18, 2021, a music video for the song was released, featuring fellow YouTuber and streamer Valkyrae portraying Corpse. The song became Corpse's first Billboard Hot 100 entry, charting at number 88, and second on the UK Singles Chart, peaking at number 53.

In April 2021, Corpse participated in an hour-long charity Among Us stream on The Tonight Show with Jimmy Fallon, members of The Roots, fellow streamers Valkyrae and Sykkuno, and Stranger Things actors Gaten Matarazzo and Noah Schnapp, with proceeds going towards Feeding America.

In September 2021, Corpse released a single entitled "Hot Demon B!tches Near U!!!" in collaboration with Night Lovell.

In February 2022, Funimation announced Corpse's English dub debut voice role as Ōjirō Ōtori in the anime adaptation of Kazutaka Kodaka's Tribe Nine.

== Personal life ==
Corpse has conditions such as fibromyalgia, thoracic outlet syndrome and GERD, the latter of which has partially caused his voice to become deeper. He has also stated that he frequently wears an eyepatch due to strain from the brightness of blue light screens.

== Filmography ==
Year	Show	Role	Notes	Ref.
2022	Tribe Nine	Ōjirō Ōtori	Voice; English dub	

== Discography ==
=== Singles ===
==== As a lead artist ====
List of singles, with selected chart positions, showing year released and album name
Title	Year	Peak chart positions							Certifications	Album
Title	Year	US Bub.	US Rock/Alt.	BUL	LTU	NZ Hot	UK	WW	Certifications	Album
"Miss You!"	2020	—	31	—	—	—	—	—	RIAA: Gold	Non-album singles
"Cat Girls Are Ruining My Life!"	2020	—	—	—	—	—	—	—		Non-album singles
"Cabin Fever"	2020	—	—	—	—	—	—	—		Non-album singles
"Never Satisfied"	2020	—	—	—	—	—	—	—		Non-album singles
"White Tee"	2020	—	32	—	—	—	—	—		Non-album singles
"E-Girls Are Ruining My Life!" (featuring Savage Ga$p)	2020	24	—	28	—	—	90	—	RIAA: Platinum; BPI: Silver; RMNZ: Gold	Non-album singles
"Agoraphobic"	2020	—	21	—	—	—	—	—	RIAA: Gold	Non-album singles
"Hot Demon B!tches Near U!!!" (with Night Lovell)	2021	13	—	—	38	—	86	195	RIAA: Gold; RMNZ: Gold	Non-album singles
"Poltergeist!" (with OmenXIII)	2022	—	20	—	—	4	—	—		Non-album singles
"Fuk U Lol"	2022	—	35	—	—	6	—	—		Non-album singles
"Life Waster"	2022	—	—	—	—	16	—	—		Non-album singles
"Misa Misa!" (with Scarlxrd and Kordhell)	2022	—	26	—	—	—	—	—		Non-album singles
"Like Yxu Wxuld Knxw (Autumn Trees)" (with Scarlxrd and Kordhell)	2022	—	—	—	—	—	—	—		Psychx
"Code Mistake" (with Bring Me the Horizon)	2023	—	35	—	—	13	—	—		Non-album single
"—" denotes a recording that did not chart or was not released in that territory.

==== As a featured artist ====
List of singles, with selected chart positions, showing year released and album name
Title	Year	Peak chart positions							Album
Title	Year	US	US Rock/Alt.	CAN	IRL	NZ Hot	UK	WW	Album
"Grim Grinning Ghost" (The Living Tombstone featuring Corpse & Crusher P)	2016	—	—	—	—	—	—	—	Non-album singles
"DayWalker" (Machine Gun Kelly featuring Corpse)	2021	88	8	62	70	9	53	170	Non-album singles
"—" denotes a recording that did not chart or was not released in that territory.
