= Night Lovell =

American musician (born 1997)

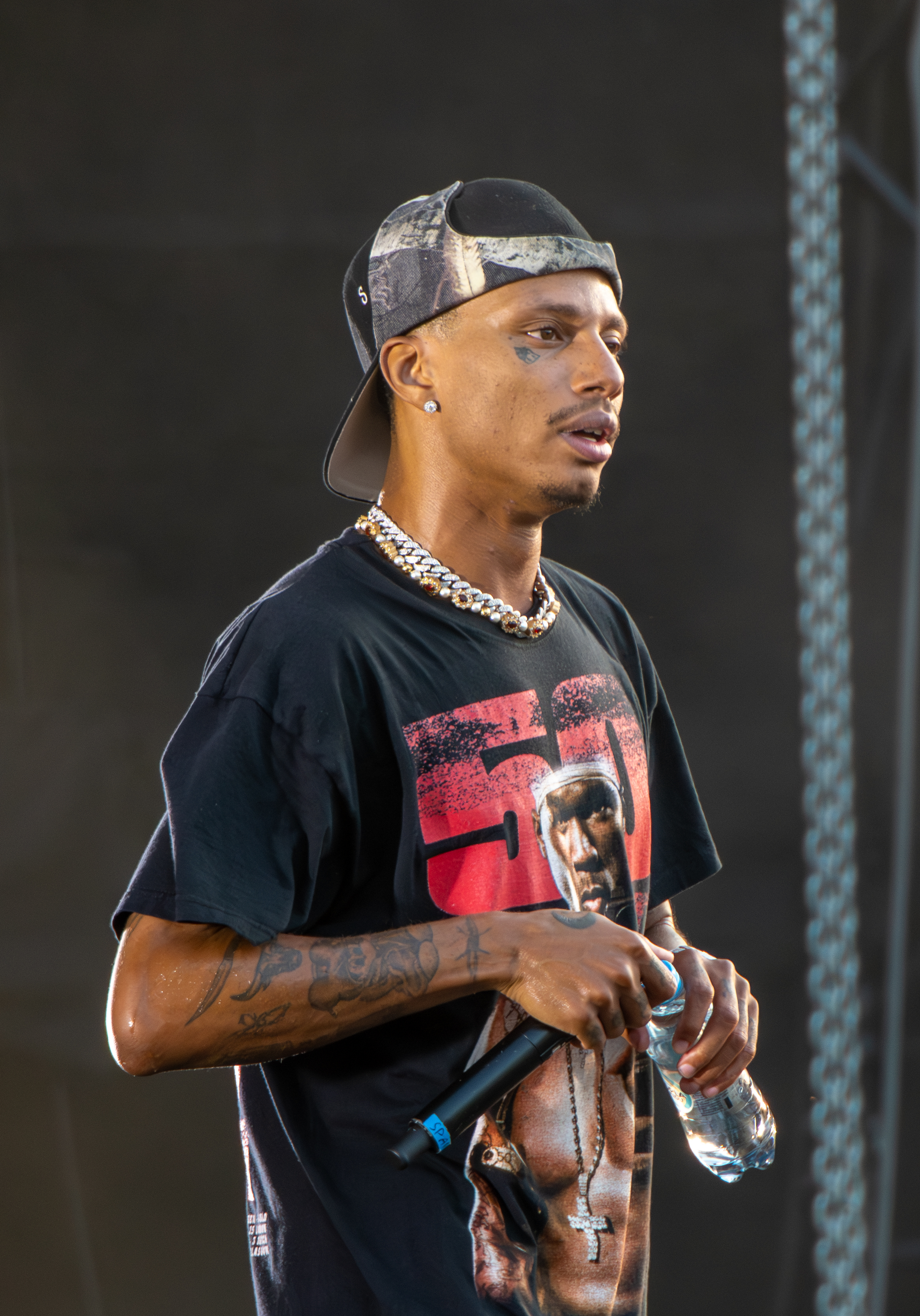
- Night Lovell in 2024

Background information
- Born: Shermar Cuba Paul; May 29, 1997 (age 29); Ottawa, Ontario, Canada
- Genres: Hip hop; trap; cloud rap; grime; phonk
- Occupations: Rapper; songwriter; record producer
- Instruments: Vocals; FL Studio
- Years active: 2013–present
- Labels: G*59; The Orchard (current); Caroline (former)
- Website: nightlovell.com

Shermar Cuba Paul (born May 29, 1997), known professionally as Night Lovell, is a Canadian rapper, songwriter and record producer. He initially gained fame after his song Dark Light went viral in 2014. He has released four studio albums named Red Teenage Melody released on June 13, 2016, Goodnight Lovell released on February 22, 2019, Just Say You Don't Care, released May 6, 2021, and I Hope You're Happy released on December 8, 2023. He was a featured artist on American YouTuber and musician Corpse Husband's "Hot Demon Bitches Near U ! ! !", which released on September 3, 2021.

As of 2023, Night Lovell had been streamed over 750 million times on Spotify worldwide.

== Musical style ==
His musical style is often categorized by its dark and atmospheric sound. He has been described as "effortlessly conjur[ing] darkness".

His songs have a brooding atmosphere, with the subject matter often revolving around themes of introspection and angst. This results in the pervasive dark tone that populates both the lyrics and instrumentation, which itself incorporates elements of drill, trap, and cloud rap, as well as ambient elements.

== Discography ==
=== Studio albums ===
Title	Details
Red Teenage Melody	Released: June 13, 2016; Label: Self-released; Format: Digital download, streaming
Goodnight Lovell	Released: February 22, 2019; Label: G*59, Caroline; Format: Digital download, streaming
Just Say You Don't Care	Released: May 7, 2021; Label: G*59, Caroline; Format: Digital download, streaming
I Hope You're Happy	Released: December 8, 2023; Label: G*59, The Orchard; Format: Digital download, streaming
MY BLOOD AS THE INK	Released: August 28, 2026; Label: G*59, The Orchard; Format: Digital download, streaming

=== Extended plays ===
- I'll Be Back (2014)

=== Mixtapes ===
- Concept Vague (2014)

=== Singles ===
Title	Year	Peak chart positions		Certifications	Album
Title	Year	US Bub.	Glob. 200	Certifications	Album
"Dark Light"	2014	—	—	MC: Platinum; RIAA: Gold	Concept Vague
"Still Cold / Pathway Private"	2015	—	—	MC: Gold	Red Teenage Melody
"Give Me The Keys" (featuring Dylan Brady)	2015	—	—		Non-album singles
"Female Confusion"	2015	—	—		Non-album singles
"Fraud"	2015	—	—		Non-album singles
"Louis V"	2016	—	—		Red Teenage Melody
"Contraband"	2016	—	—		Red Teenage Melody
"Whoever U Are"	2017	—	—		Non-album singles
"RIP Trust"	2017	—	—		Non-album singles
"Jamie's Sin"	2017	—	—		Non-album singles
"Joan of Arc" (w/ $uicideboy$)	2018	—	—		Goodnight Lovell
"Bad Kid"	2019	—	—		Goodnight Lovell
"Pink Witch / Lesson"	2019	—	—		Goodnight Lovell
"Casket"	2019	—	—		
"Mary Jane"	2019	—	—		Non-album singles
"Lethal Presence"	—	—			Non-album singles
"I Heard You Were Looking For Me"	2020	—	—		Non-album singles
"Alone"	2020	—	—		Just Say You Don't Care
"Counting Down the List"	2021	—	—		Just Say You Don't Care
"A Lot" (w/ Lindasson & FTG Reggie)	2021	—	—		Non-album single
"Bottom Top"	2021	—	—		Just Say You Don't Care
"Hot Demon B!tches Near U ! ! !" (w/ Corpse Husband)	2021	13	195	RIAA: Gold	Non-album singles
"Mr. Make Her Dance"	2022	—	—		Non-album singles
"Eye Spy"	2022			—	I Hope You're Happy
"My Day Is Ruined !"	2023		—	—	I Hope You're Happy
"Freak" (w/ Freddie Dredd)	2023		—	—	I Hope You're Happy

==== Guest appearances ====
List of non-single guest appearances, with other performing artists, showing year released and album name
Title	Year	Other performer(s)	Album
"Ascension"	2014	Cight	Architecture
"Icefind"	2014	Misogi	Occult
"Let Go / Enemies"	2015	Dylan Brady, NOK from the Future	All I Ever Wanted
"314"	2015	Dylan Brady	All I Ever Wanted
"Do You Think I'm Mean?"	2015	Cake Pop, Dylan Brady, Robel Ketema	Cake Pop
"Up North"	2015	NOK from the Future, Cousin Stizz	—N/a
"Gone"	2016	Misogi	PlayMisogi®
"Worldwide"	2016	Misogi, Curtis Heron, Fifty Grand, Dylan Brady	PlayMisogi®
"Still Finessin'"	2016	Nessly	Still Finessin'
"Fukk!CodeRed"	2016	Lil West	Indigo 2
"Everything OK"	2016	Aaron Cartier	The Cartier
"Trapped in Tokyo"	2017	CJ TopOff	Psychodelia
"Psychodelia"	2017	CJ TopOff	Psychodelia
"Omen"	2017	Blvc Svnd	I Am Not Human
"Don't Bang My Line"	2018	Pouya	Five Five
"Love Kills Slowly"	2018	DJ Scheme, Fat Nick	—N/a
"Strap"	2020	Karma Sutra	Sad Shorty
"Shaded Summers"	2020	The Time Traveller	—N/a
"Red Dot"	2020	Ramirez	Tha Playa$ Manal
"Human"	2020	Snot	—N/a
"2 Time Zones"	2021	bbno$	Eat Ya Veggies
"Ms Porter"	2022	Snot	—N/a
"Carried Away"	2025	$uicideboys	THY KINGDOM COME

== Awards and nominations ==
Award Ceremony	Year	Nominee/Work	Category	Result
Berlin Music Video Awards	2024	MY DAY IS RUINED !	Best Concept	Nominated
