= Daywalker! =

2021 single by Machine Gun Kelly and Corpse Husband

Single by Machine Gun Kelly featuring Corpse Husband
- Released: March 12, 2021
- Genre: Trap metal; techno-punk
- Length: 2:17
- Label: Bad Boy; Interscope
- Songwriters: Colson Baker; Corpse Husband
- Producers: Machine Gun Kelly; BazeXX; SlimXX

Machine Gun Kelly singles chronology
| "Acting Like That" (2020) | "Daywalker!" (2021) | "Love Race" (2021) |

Corpse Husband singles chronology
| "Agoraphobic" (2020) | "Daywalker!" (2021) | "Hot Demon Bitches Near U!!!" (2021) |

Music video
- "Daywalker!" on YouTube

"Daywalker!" (stylized as "DAYWALKER!") is a song by American musician Machine Gun Kelly featuring fellow American musician and YouTuber Corpse Husband that was released on March 12, 2021. It is a trap metal and techno-punk song produced by Kelly, BazeXX, and SlimXX with additional writing credit by Corpse Husband. Music video co-directed by Kelly and Sam Cahill was published on March 18, and it features Kelly fighting with another man and Valkyrae portraying Corpse Husband. The song garnered commendable success despite being censored on several platforms & playlisting, charting at number 53 in the UK, and 88 in the US, becoming Corpse's first entry on the Billboard Hot 100.

== Background and composition ==
In December 2020, Corpse Husband offhandedly announced the collaboration on Twitter, writing "song w/ MGK is so crazy". On March 9, 2021, Corpse confirmed the song's release on March 12, and showcased its cover art and title. "Daywalker!" was written by Corpse Husband, Machine Gun Kelly, Stephen Basil, and Brandon Allen, when the latter three produced the track. The song has been described by critics as techno-punk and trap metal. It is a revenge song containing horrorcore elements that spans for two minutes and seventeen seconds. In the song, both acts detail how they will violently get revenge on those who have done them wrong. Corpse uses menacing vocals on his verse.

== Reception ==
Writing for Rolling Stone Althea Legaspi called "Daywalker!" verses "vampiric" and "bloodthirsty". Gil Kaufman of Billboard described Corpse's vocals as "rumbling" and "rage whispering".

In the United States, "Daywalker!" debuted at number 88 on the Billboard Hot 100 on week ending March 27, 2021, becoming Kelly's twelfth and Corpse's first ever entry on the chart. It also debuted at number nine on the Hot Rock & Alternative Songs chart, becoming Kelly's eighth top-ten single on the chart, and Corpse's first. It peaked at number eight next week. In Canada it became Kelly's seventeenth entry, while being Corpse's first, charting at number 62, and spending two weeks on the chart. It also debuted at number 53 on the UK Singles Chart, becoming Kelly's sixth entry on the chart, and Corpse's second, charting for three weeks. The track also peaked at number 19 in Hungary, 70 in Ireland, and at number 170 on the Billboard Global 200 chart.

== Music video ==
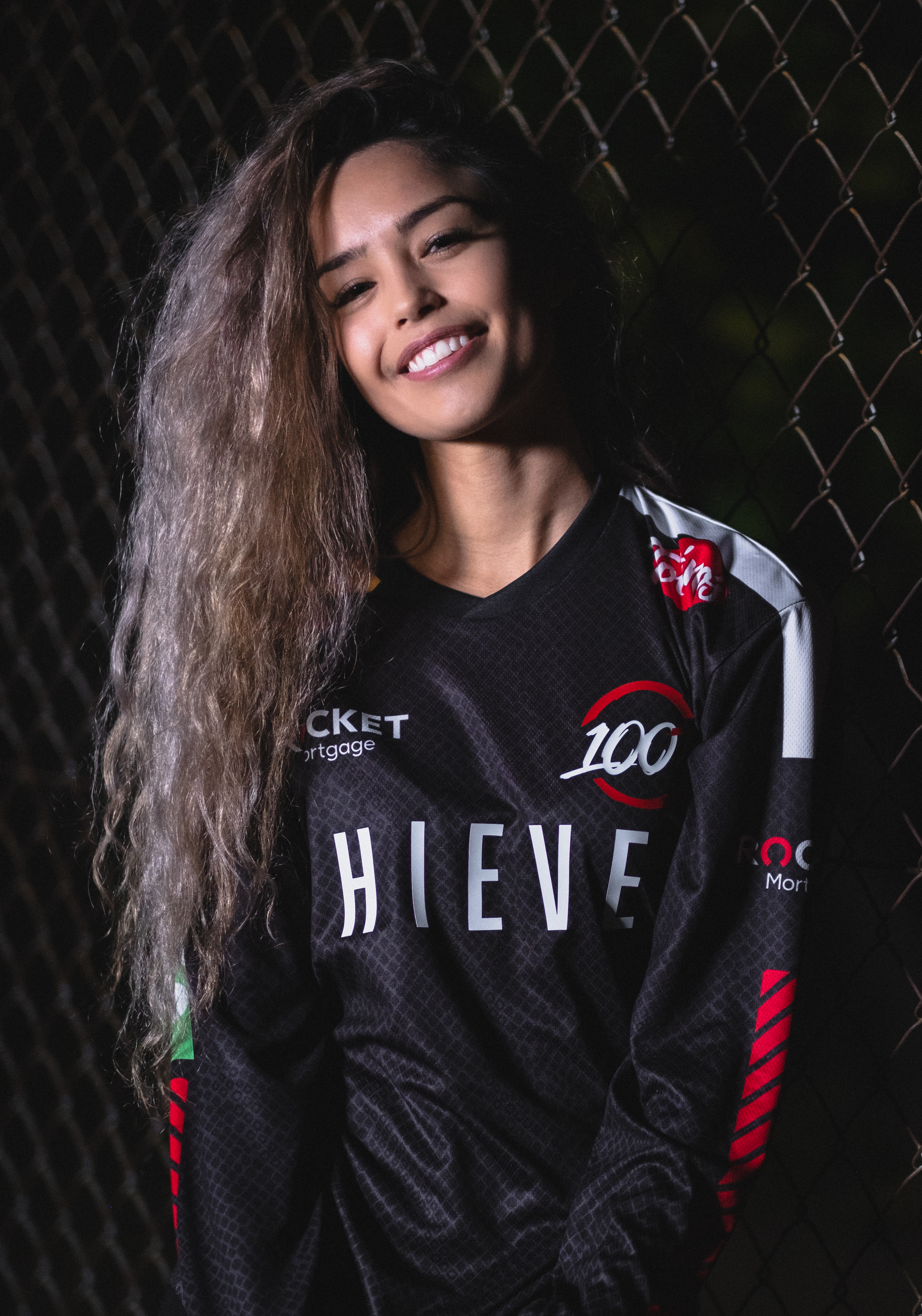
American YouTuber and streamer Valkyrae portrays Corpse in the music video.

=== Background and production ===
A music video for the song was released on March 18, 2021. It stars Machine Gun Kelly while Corpse is portrayed by his friend and frequent collaborator, American Internet personality Valkyrae. It was also directed by Colson Baker and Sam Cahill. Prior to the video's release, Rae published many tweets linking her involvement in it. On the day of the video's release, she published a behind the scenes video on her YouTube channel, where she confirmed that Machine Gun Kelly himself wanted her to portray Corpse.

=== Synopsis and reception ===
The music video is divided into six acts. The first shows Kelly brawling with a man. The next depicts him in a police interrogation room, banging a table in frustration. In act three, Valkyrae appears in a latex suit, lip-syncing Corpse Husband's lyrics. Act four depicts the song's chorus, with her spitting clouds of blood on a white wall. Act five shows blood flowing down from a hand. The final act features close-ups of both performers' faces, with Kelly's mouth slashed open from ear to ear.

Billboard's Gil Kaufman called the music video "hyper, frantic visual that matches the song's hectic beat," and commented on Machine Gun Kelly's make-up from the sixth act as it was resembling the Joker. Nick Reilly from NME called the video "unsettling".

== Personnel ==
Credits adapted from Tidal.

- Machine Gun Kelly – vocals, production, composition, lyrics
- Corpse Husband – vocals, lyrics
- Stephen "BazeXX" Basil – bass, keyboards, programming, production, lyrics
- Brandon "SlimXX" Allen – programming, production, lyrics, composition
- Fabian Marasciullo – mixing

== Charts ==
=== Weekly charts ===
Weekly chart performance for "Daywalker!"
| Chart (2021) | Peak position |
|---|---|
| Canada Hot 100 (Billboard) | 62 |
| Global 200 (Billboard) | 170 |
| Hungary (Single Top 40) | 19 |
| Ireland (IRMA) | 70 |
| Lithuania (AGATA) | 60 |
| New Zealand Hot Singles (RMNZ) | 9 |
| UK Singles (OCC) | 53 |
| US Billboard Hot 100 | 88 |
| US Hot Rock & Alternative Songs (Billboard) | 8 |
| US Hot Rap Songs (Billboard) | 25 |

=== Year-end charts ===
Year-end chart performance for "Daywalker!"
| Chart (2021) | Position |
|---|---|
| US Hot Rock & Alternative Songs (Billboard) | 74 |
