= Arcade Spirits =

2019 video game

- Developer: Fiction Factory Games
- Publisher: PQube
- Director: Stefan Gagne
- Series: Arcade Spirits
- Platforms: Windows; Nintendo Switch; PlayStation 4 Xbox One
- Genres: Dating sim, visual novel
- Mode: Single-player

Arcade Spirits is a dating sim visual novel video game released in 2019 for Microsoft Windows and in 2020 for PlayStation 4, Nintendo Switch, and Xbox One. It was developed by Fiction Factory Games and published by PQube. Set in an alternate history where the video game crash of 1983 never happened, arcades remain popular. Players control a customizable character who can be female, male, or non-binary, and can choose whether they want to approach the seven romance candidates romantically or platonically.

== Plot ==
Arcade Spirits is set in an alternate history where the video game crash of 1983 never occurred, and arcades continued to thrive. Players control a customizable character, who can be either female, male, or non-binary, with the default name of Ari Cader. Ari shares a home with their roommate, Juniper, who encourages them to look for a new job using a phone app called IRIS. This app has an artificial intelligence named Iris, who helps Ari apply for a job at an arcade called the Funplex as a floor manager. She is hired by an elderly woman named Francine, who hires them due to their experience with working as a lifeguard, which she deems suitable experience for working in a high-stress environment. While working at the Funplex, Ari meets a number of people, most of whom work at the Funplex, and may choose to participate in romantic relationships with certain characters. Ari may pursue characters romantically regardless of any genders involved.

Throughout the game, Ari goes on jobs with both employees of the Funplex as well as regulars in order to help out the Funplex in various ways.

=== Characters ===
- Ari — The player-character, whose gender, name, and other features can be determined by the player.
- Naomi (Voiced by: Stephanie Sheh) — Naomi is an employee of the Funplex who works on maintaining the arcade units.
- Gavin (Voiced by: Ogie Banks) — Gavin is an employee of the Funplex who works on the budget and logistics surrounding the company.
- Ashley (Voiced by: Amber Leigh) — Ashley is an employee of the Funplex who is a fan of cosplaying.
- Teo (Voiced by: Christopher Escalante) — Teo is a regular at the Funplex who specializes in rhythm and dancing games.
- QueenBee (Voiced by: Nazia Chaudhry) — QueenBee is a regular at the Funplex who specializes in competitive video games.
- Percy (Voiced by: Price Johnson) — Percy is a regular at the Funplex who focuses on aiming for the highscore of the fictional arcade game, Moopy's Magic Maze.
- Juniper (Voiced by: LilyPichu) — Ari's roommate.

== Gameplay ==
Players take control of a customizable character, whose gender, skin color, hair length, hair color, hoodie color, and name (which defaults to Ari) can be determined. Players can also customize Ari's personality, using an in-game mechanic called the Identity Identifier System, which judges Ari on various traits. This affects how Ari interacts with other characters in the game. Picking certain dialogue choices will both affect Ari's relationship with other characters as well as influence how strong these traits are. If a certain trait does not have enough time put into it, certain dialogue choices will be locked. By building up relations with certain characters, Ari may romance them at some point.

== Development ==
Its development took a little over two years before the first release. Arcade Spirits was developed by Fiction Factory Games and published by PQube, with writing done by Stefan Gagne and Aenne Schumann, the former who also served as project director. It was Fiction Factory Games' first project. Schumann had written for other works before, but it was their first time working as a narrative designer. Gagne came to work with Schumann after they met through a mutual friend at a PAX East panel titled "Romance in Video Games," at which point they became friends. Gagne later asked Schumann if they would like to work on a game with him, which Schumann accepted. Gagne and Schumann made a point of hiring a diverse team for the game's development. The team behind Arcade Spirits put out a casting call looking for musicians to work on the game. A Patreon was opened to support development of the game, offering early access to demos and the full game depending on how much a person contributes. The game was featured at the 2018 EGX expo with a playable demo. Gagne explained that the voice acting was the most difficult part of the development, though voice director Jacob Burgess made it significantly easier for it to get done. Schumann, meanwhile, regarded time management as the most difficult part, owing to their full-time jobs outside of developing Arcade Spirits. Schumann noted that development was made much easier with PQube's assistance, especially for the console releases.

=== Character and plot development ===
The idea for Arcade Spirits came from Gagne's interest in arcade hardware restoration videos on YouTube as well as his interest in 80s workplace sitcoms such as Night Court, Cheers, and Murphy Brown. Naomi was the first character that the writers conceived, and was meant to represent the people in those restoration videos, describing her as a person as someone who is "tinkering away and desperately trying to bring a 1980s classic back to life." Each character at the Funplex was meant to represent a different aspect of arcade culture. Gavin represented both pinball fans and the challenge of keeping an arcade afloat, Percy represented highscore chasing, QueenBee represented the competitive gaming scene, Teo represented the dancing and rhythm genre, and Ashley represented how fandoms can grow around gaming. Gagne and Schumann identified these characters with a single word early on in development; for example, Naomi, Teo, and Ashley were labelled Fixer, Dancer, and Cosplayer respectively. The two of them split these characters in half, each taking on writing duties for their half of the cast. They wrote their respective characters with their life and experience with the arcade serving as inspiration. Voice actress LilyPichu was hired to play the character Juniper, with Gagne exclaiming that Lily understood Juniper right away.

Gagne felt that there were a number of visual novels that either had "highly defined protagonists and zero self-expression" or "blandly designed generic protagonists but little roleplaying." He found this limiting, which influenced him to approach Arcade Spirits by bringing western role-playing game standards and feature them in a visual novel, which he did by adding character customization and a "core gameplay loop" about the protagonist "defining" both themselves and how they solve problems. There were limitations for the player art due to design choices.

Gagne identified Naomi as the easiest character to write due to how relatable she was as a "shy nerd" with a "fading hobby." He felt the "fire" in Naomi was as fun to write as the "love in her heart." Teo, however, was the hardest for Gagne to write, exclaiming that he "never really got a read" on him in part due to Schumann having written his dialogue. Meanwhile, Schumann found QueenBee to be the easiest, finding it fun to write a character with a "sassy" attitude. Ashley was the hardest character to write, though this was due to how Ashley represented Schumann's own experiences and discovering that they were non-binary. They found it difficult to write their "raw emotions" into Ashley, as it was "deeply personal" and they wanted to get it right.

=== Diversity and accessibility ===
Schumann expressed a desire to see games be as diverse as possible, noting that while they like romance and dating sim games, they felt off to them, due to them being pansexual and non-binary. They designed Arcade Spirits with the desire to make it as inclusive as possible, including allowing people to not pursue romance at all. Gagne, being asexual and queer, found it important that players not be made to get into a romantic relationship. To Gagne, Arcade Spirits was about arcades and the "wonderful people" you meet within them. While designing the characters, they worked with sensitivity readers in order to avoid "common pitfalls" when it comes to representation and made tweaks when the writing wasn't "clicking." They also worked with visually impaired communities in order to determine what enhancements should be made for the PC version of the game that were not available with the engine used.

== Release ==
Arcade Spirits was announced in August 2018, with a tentative release date for PCs of 2019. It was ultimately released on February 12, 2019. Arcade Spirits was revealed for a May 1, 2020 release on Nintendo Switch, PlayStation 4, and Xbox One digitally, with development having begun shortly after completion of the PC version's development.

It was featured as part of itch.io's Bundle for Racial Justice and Equality.

== Reception ==
Arcade Spirits has received generally positive reception, with aggregate website OpenCritic identifying it as receiving "strong" reviews. Washington Post writer Christopher Byrd compared Arcade Spirits to a "beach read," calling it "charming and relatable" and noting that it understands its audience. They were critical of its art style, noting that the repetition of environments became worse due to its art style not being strong enough. However, they felt the story was strong enough to keep them interested, discussing how it specifically examines gaming in a critical light. GamesRadar+'s Heather Wald listed Arcade Spirits in their list of the best visual novels, praising it for its cast of characters and "creative nods" to arcade games. They also appreciated how much choice there was, contributing to good replay value. RPGFan writer Alana Hagues was "surprised" by the game, noting that while it was not "genre-defining," it left players with a "warm feeling" upon completion. They particularly enjoyed being able to decide whether their character wanted romance or not, as they felt it allowed players to decide how they wanted to play their character better. They also found the cast to be one of their favorites in any visual novel. However, they felt that the voice acting was uneven and found some character and background art didn't mesh well together. RPGamer writer Sam Wachter felt that fans of otome games or romantic comedies would enjoy Arcade Spirits, citing its visuals, voice acting, and the love put into it by the game's designers. They also praised it for "clever" writing and humor. Digitally Downloaded writer Priscilla M. called it a "must play" for fans of visual novels, dating sims, and arcades, praising the optional nature of its romance element for not turning off those who may lack interest in romance. They found the cast and story "wonderful" and noted that it stuck with them days after completion.

The Nintendo Switch release received generally positive reception. Early impressions of the Nintendo Switch version by RPGamer writer Anna Marie Privitere noted the game was well suited for "five-minute bursts or five-hour marathons and still be enjoyable," making it a good fit for the Switch. Nintendo Life writer Ollie Reynolds was generally positive towards the Nintendo Switch version of the game, praising it for its diversity, ability to choose to not romance anyone, its visual style, and writing. However, they felt some of the voice acting was poor, focused too much on nostalgia, and had low volume when played in the Nintendo Switch's handheld mode. NintendoWorldReport writer Jordan Rudek was more critical of the game. They praised it for its character customization, but felt that the character relationships "aren't earned" and criticized the dialogue choice system for being uncompelling. They also felt that the presentation was poor and that the writing relied too much on references. Digitally Downloaded writer Matthew Codd found glitches with the Switch release, but noted that this should not make someone avoid the game. They described the game as "warm, funny, [and] moving," and praised its cast of characters.

== Sequel ==
A sequel to Arcade Spirits, titled Arcade Spirits: The New Challengers, was announced in June 2020 and released on May 27, 2022.
