= OfflineTV =

American online media collective

TikTok information
- Pages: OfflineTV Associated channels; Scarra; LilyPichu; Disguised Toast; Yvonnie; Michael Reeves; Sydeon; Masayoshi; QuarterJade
- Genres: Gaming; IRL streams
- Followers: 675.1 thousand

YouTube information
- Channel: OfflineTV
- Years active: 2017–present
- Genres: Comedy; entertainment; gaming
- Subscribers: 3.29 million
- Views: 1 Billion
- Last updated: July 21, 2026
- Website: offlinetv.com

OfflineTV, LLC is an online social entertainment group of content creators based in Los Angeles, California. They produce a wide range of content, from prank videos to vlogs to the housemates playing games together. The group maintains a large following on their social media platforms.

== History ==
OfflineTV was founded in 2017 by William "Scarra" Li, his manager at the time, Chris Chan, and Imane "Pokimane" Anys. After previously attempting and failing at creating a successful content house, Li then went on to found OfflineTV. Its first three members were Scarra, Based Yoona, and Pokimane.

I think I just wanted to live with friends. That was the origin of it. I wanted to live with people and make cool stuff with other people. It was myself and my manager Chris who started this idea.

— Li on the origins of OfflineTV

"Seasons" of the OfflineTV are more or less distinguished for every house the group has moved into throughout the years. After living together for four years, the group left the content house and began living separately following the expiration of their lease in December 2021, citing that they wanted to try new things while remaining as part of OfflineTV. As of December 16, 2022, most of the OfflineTV members have moved in together again, with the exception of Pokimane, Michael Reeves and Yvonne. As of September 2024, the talent are spread between Los Angeles, Seattle, and Vancouver.

In 2023, OfflineTV officially announced the departure of co-founder Pokimane through a graduation, although she continues to remain part of their circle, OfflineTV and Friends, and has been present in some later videos.

== Current members ==
Nickname	Joined	Role(s)	Refs.
Scarra	2017	Cofounder, Talent	
LilyPichu	2017	Talent	
Disguised Toast	2017	Talent	
Michael Reeves	2019	Talent	
Sydeon	2021	Talent	
Masayoshi	2021	Talent	
QuarterJade	2021	Talent	
Yvonnie	2018	Talent, previously Management	
Brodin Plett	2020	Creative Director	

=== Scarra ===
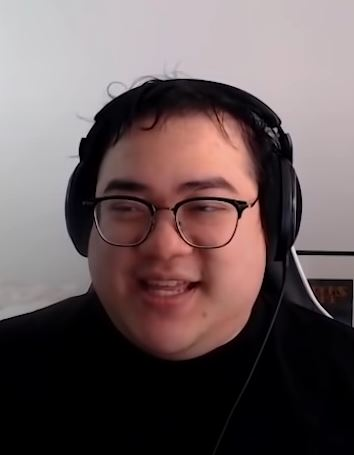
Scarra in 2020

William Li (born November 25, 1989), better known by his alias Scarra, is an American Twitch streamer and former pro League of Legends player. He is most well known for being the mid laner for Team Dignitas. Scarra is a co-founder of OfflineTV, along with his then-manager Chris Chan.

=== LilyPichu ===
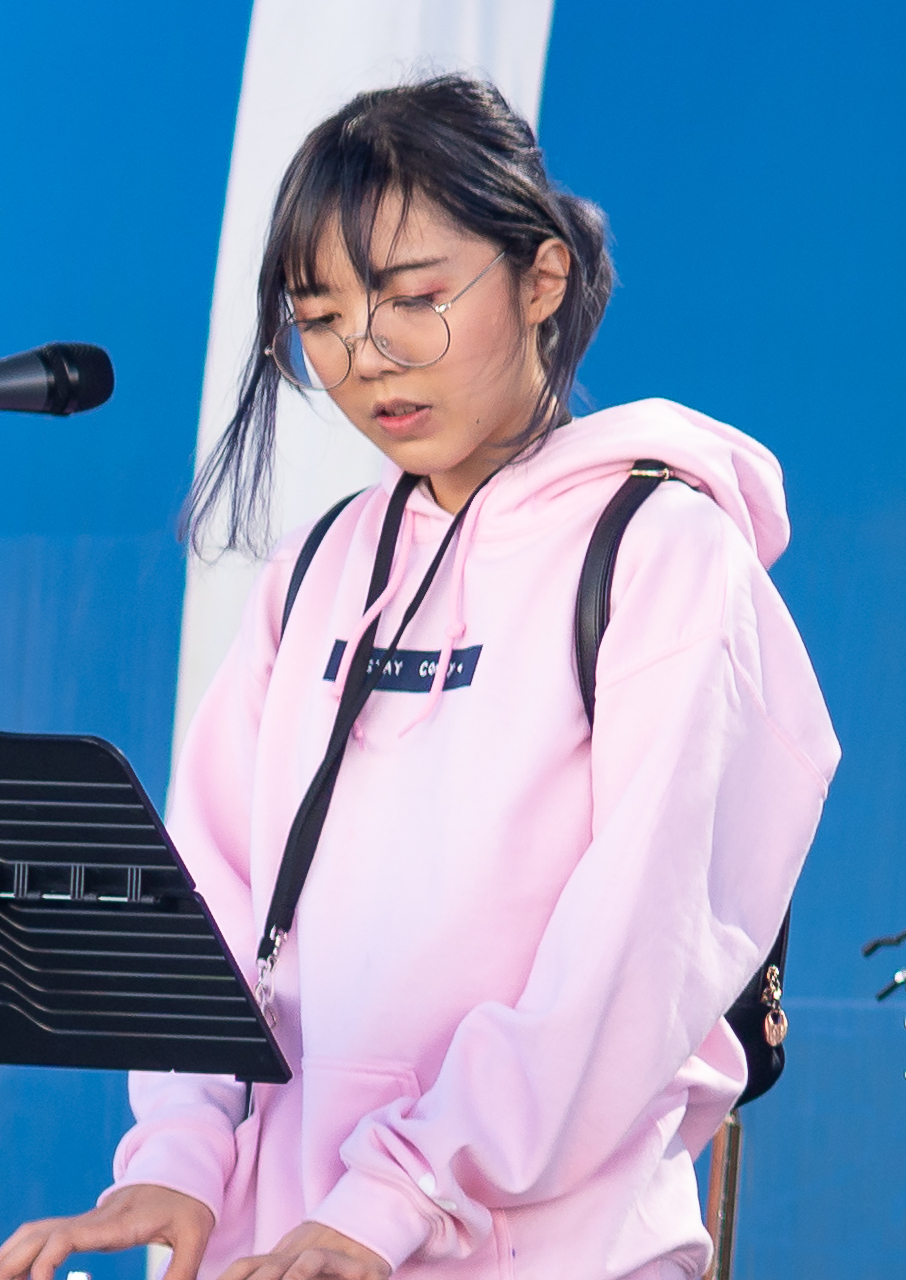
LilyPichu in 2018

Lily Ki (born November 20, 1991), also known as LilyPichu, is an American Twitch streamer, musician, and YouTube personality. Lily gained popularity in 2011 when she released her song "I'll Quit LoL," amassing over 8 million views on YouTube. Her YouTube channel consists of animations, vlogs, songs, art, and piano covers while her Twitch stream consists of League of Legends, IRL content, art, and music.

In September 2018, Riot Games launched a new series of ads on YouTube for League of Legends including one featuring Lily and former OfflineTV member sleightlymusical. It was titled "LilyPichu & sleightlymusical: Duo".

On February 20, 2020, she confirmed that she was in a relationship with fellow OfflineTV member Michael Reeves.

=== Disguised Toast ===
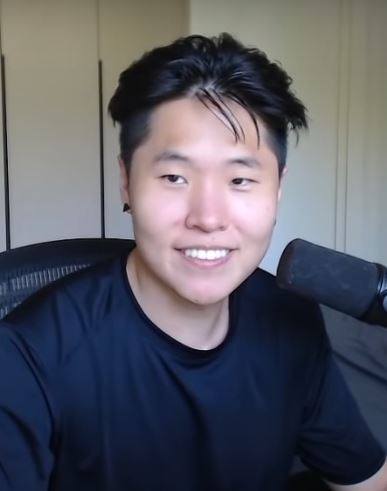
DisguisedToast in 2021

Jeremy Wang (born November 25, 1991), better known by his alias Disguised Toast, is a Taiwanese-Canadian Twitch and Facebook streamer who rose to fame playing Hearthstone. He got his alias from a Hearthstone card named SI:7 Agent, one of whose voice line is "This guy's toast," which is commonly misheard in the community as "disguised toast". Wang began his activity in the Hearthstone community by making infographics and YouTube videos of unusual card interactions that he shared on Reddit. Wang covered his face with a toast-shaped cardboard mask with sunglasses when he began streaming until he revealed his face by mistake in October 2016. In October 2017, Wang joined OfflineTV.

In November 2019, Wang announced his departure from Twitch and had moved to streaming on Facebook Gaming. In November 2021, Wang announced his return to Twitch.

=== Yvonnie ===
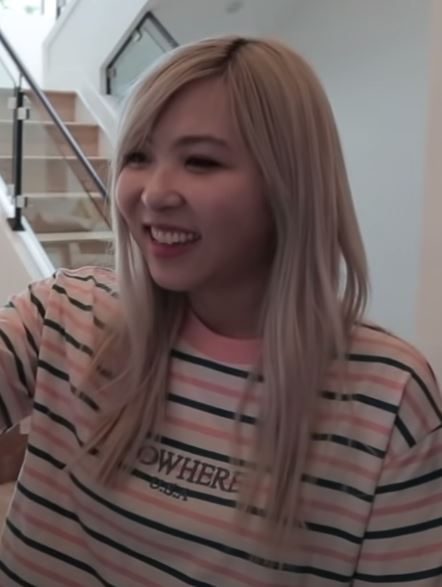
Yvonnie

Yvonne Ng (born October 8, 1990), also known as Yvonnie, is a Twitch streamer. Yvonne joined the group in 2018 as the house manager, having been acquainted with co-founder and former-OfflineTV member Pokimane for several years. While initially considered as part of support staff, she would later be included as part of the OTV Roster in their video descriptions.

=== Michael Reeves ===
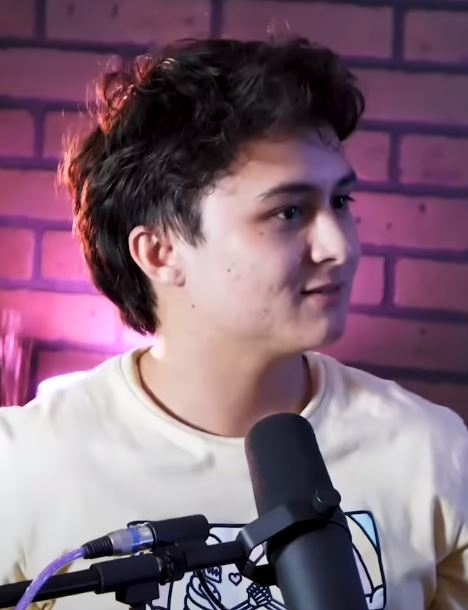
Michael Reeves

Michael Reeves (born November 20, 1997) is a Filipino-American Twitch streamer and YouTube personality known for his comedic engineering videos and eccentric on-camera persona. Michael previously worked as a software developer in Hawaii. His first video, "The Robot That Shines a Laser in Your Eye" posted in April 2017, went viral. He made his debut into Twitch streaming in June 2020, where he streams both video games and technology work.

After much speculation, he was officially announced as a member of OfflineTV in December 2019. In February 2020, fellow OfflineTV member LilyPichu confirmed that she and Reeves were in a relationship.

=== Sydeon ===
Sydney Parker (born June 11, 1997), also known as Sydeon, and previously as Neytiri before rebranding in November 2020, is an American Twitch streamer and cosplayer. She started streaming in January 2019 and acquired a degree in nursing before pursuing streaming full-time. She joined OfflineTV in November 2021. In 2022, she signed with The Society Management, which led to high-profile brand partnerships with companies like StockX .

=== Masayoshi ===
John Cable (born June 18, 1997), also known as Masayoshi, is an American Twitch streamer. He acquired his Twitch partnership in late 2019 and is well-known for his League of Legends and Valorant streams. He joined OfflineTV in November 2021 with his partner and fellow OfflineTV member QuarterJade. Throughout the year of 2024 and 2025, He launched "Masayoshi Games," a recurring Minecraft Rivals event that became a staple of his channel.

=== QuarterJade ===
Jodi Lee (born August 25, 1997), also known as QuarterJade, is an American streamer, streaming on Twitch since October 2017. She joined OfflineTV in November 2021. She is in a relationship with fellow OfflineTV member Masayoshi.

=== Brodin Plett ===
Brodin Plett (born March 18, 1994), also known as Brofain, is an American director, producer, who has been streaming on Twitch since November 2016. Plett previously worked as a cinematographer and editor for Yahoo! Esports. He joined OfflineTV in 2020 and would later be credited the role as the "Creative Director" of the group. He is one half of the musical duo templuv. He, alongside Julian Conner, his partner in templuv, and 347aidan, notably produced the song Last Shot, the official theme song for the 2025 Valorant Champions tournament in Paris, with all three artists performing the song during the opening ceremony for the grand finals at the Accor Arena.

== Former members ==
Nickname	Joined	Former role(s)	Departed	Refs.
Pokimane	2017	Co-founder, Personality	2023	
Chris Chan	2017	Management, Co-founder	2018	
Pecca	2017	Management, Personality	2018	
BasedYoona	2017	Personality	2018	
PokeLawls	2017	Personality	2018	
TheeMarkZ	2017	Production, Personality	2019	
Xell	2017	Production, Personality	2019	
Fedmyster	2017	Production, Personality, Former editor	2020	
EdisonParkLive	2017	Management, Personality	2019	
SleightlyMusical	2017	Production, Personality	2019	
Seanic	2018	Production, Podcast Manager	2019	

=== Fedmyster ===
Avatar of OfflineTV

OfflineTV
(@OfflineTV)
tweeted:

We strive to be a place where everyone can feel comfortable and safe. With that in mind, Fed has been removed from Offline TV. He will also no longer be living with us. We wholeheartedly support Yvonne, her statement, and anyone else who has the courage to share their story.

June 27, 2020

Federico Michael Gaytan, more often known as Fedmyster, is an American former Twitch streamer and YouTube personality, who is known for his IRL streams. Prior to becoming a streamer, Gaytan was a video editor and was invited to join the group as an editor in June 2017. On July 8, 2017, Gaytan published his first YouTube video with OfflineTV, where he was formally introduced as the group's editor. Afterward, Gaytan went on to make many videos with OfflineTV, garnering millions of views for the channel. Gaytan grew popular among the OfflineTV fanbase and in January 2018 started streaming and was soon officially named as part of OfflineTV talent.

On June 27, 2020, fellow OfflineTV members Yvonne "Yvonnie" Ng and Lily "LilyPichu" Ki came forward with sexual misconduct allegations involving Gaytan. Ng stated that on two separate instances, Gaytan would enter her room intoxicated and uninvited, lay down on her bed, and begin inappropriately touching her. Ki also stated that he would enter her room uninvited and make inappropriate advances on her. Gaytan was removed from the group following the allegations, and in the week following his removal, over six members of the OfflineTV friend circle came out with their own stories of his inappropriate or manipulative behavior.

On November 24, 2020, a 25-page statement by Gaytan titled "my truth" was leaked, which alleged that much of the situation was exaggerated to form a false narrative against him. Imane "Pokimane" Anys addressed the leaked document on stream the next day, conveying the situation from her point of view, but stressing that neither had ill will for the other. Gaytan later responded to the leak by stating that the statement was made months ago and that although they disagreed on some aspects, they eventually decided to keep it hidden and move on. He also noted that the statement being leaked was unintentional and undesired for both of them.

In June 2021, Gaytan uploaded a video to his YouTube channel announcing his return to content creation. Since his announcement and return, Gaytan has periodically streamed on his Twitch channel and uploaded three additional YouTube videos.

=== Albert Chang ===
Albert Chang (born November 15, 1991), known as sleightlymusical, is a Twitch streamer, YouTuber, musician, and magician. Chang's streams included instrumental music covers, magic tricks, IRL streams, and where he played League of Legends.

On November 3, 2017, Chang performed violin live at the opening ceremony of the 2017 League of Legends World Championship finals.

During his time with OfflineTV, Chang worked both in production and as an active personality. Chang also became romantically connected to fellow OfflineTV member LilyPichu while they were both in Offline TV.

In November 2019, while on a trip to Japan multiple OfflineTV members began tweeting cryptic messages that went viral on the subreddit LiveStreamFails. It was later revealed that Chang had been unfaithful to LilyPichu with another streamer Sarah Lee (avocadopeeled), keeping their communications secret using Google Docs.

Following the incident, multiple OfflineTV members apologized for their social media statements, and Chang made a statement on his Twitter saying: "I'll be taking an indefinite hiatus from content creation to reflect and spend some time alone. I'm sorry for the people I've hurt in all of our communities, I'm sorry for the friends I let down at Offline.TV, and most of all I'm sorry for hurting you, Lily."

On October 5, 2020, Chang uploaded a video to his social media accounts announcing his return to content creation. On May 17, 2022, Chang announced an indefinite break from streaming on Twitch citing finances and mental health. In October, 2022, Chang joined E-Learning Provider Tonic, as a Brand Strategy Consultant.

=== TheeMarkZ ===
Mark Zimmerman (born June 29, 1991), better known by his alias MarkZ, is the current LCS Commissioner, a former American League of Legends e-sports commentator, best known as an analyst for the North American League of Legends Championship Series, and former head analyst and assistant coach for Team Liquid. He was announced as a member of the OfflineTV production team in July 2017. In early 2018, Zimmerman temporarily left the group, citing differences with management. He later returned in July 2018, working in both production and management until late 2019.

=== EdisonParkLive ===
Edison Park (born November 22, 1988), also known as edisonparklive, is an American Twitch streamer and former manager of OfflineTV. He took over the managerial position in July 2018 after the departure of Chris Chan. Prior to joining OfflineTV, Park previously worked at Microsoft. From March 8, 2019, until April 7, 2019, Park completed the world record for the most hours streamed on Twitch in a 30-day period, streaming an average of 17 hours a day, which would accumulate up to a total of 541 hours. The previous record holder, Zizaran, streamed 506.5 hours in a 30-day period. At the end of his attempt, Park proposed to his then girlfriend, Fuslie, live on stream.

On April 23, 2019, Park announced via Twitter that he would be stepping down from the OfflineTV managerial position to focus on his streaming career.

In April 2020, Park announced that he was joining the Y Combinator-backed startup Zelos as the Head of Product. In November 2020, Park joined start-up PlayVS as a product manager. In September 2021, Park joined talent management agency RTS, a company co-founded by former OfflineTV member Pokimane. On April 1, 2022, Park announced that he would be returning to full-time streaming and on April 11, 2022, Park officially returned to live streaming on Twitch.

=== Pokimane ===
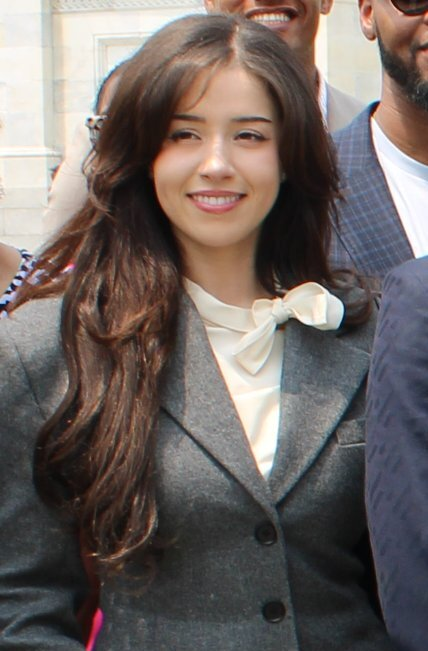
Pokimane in 2025

Imane Anys (born May 14, 1996), better known by her alias Pokimane, is a Moroccan Canadian Twitch streamer, YouTube personality, and gamer. Anys is best known for her live streams on Twitch, where she showcases her gaming experiences—most notably with League of Legends and Fortnite. In addition to streaming on Twitch, Anys has four YouTube channels: Pokimane, Pokimane Too, Imane, and the now-defunct Poki ASMR. In an interview with The Rift Herald regarding OfflineTV, Anys said, "…it's not fun being a streamer and living alone, so we decided to come together in a way so we not only keep each other company but we can also collab and actually do good work and content for everyone else." Anys was one of the first four members of OfflineTV.

Anys lived in the OfflineTV house until June 2020 and subsequently moved out to go live with fellow female streamers, including Valkyrae. While she initially announced that the move was a result of having trouble balancing work and life, Anys later revealed that growing issues with former OfflineTV member Federico "Fedmyster" Gaytan were a major contribution. Anys stated that she had lost trust in Gaytan after finding out he had lied to others about her.

On May 19, 2023, OfflineTV announced that Anys would be graduating from OfflineTV, however she still continues to have a presence in the group, having been featured in videos as a guest.

== Awards and nominations ==
Ceremony	Year	Category	Result	Ref.
Esports Awards	2022	Content Group of the Year	Nominated	
Esports Awards	2024	Esports Content Creator of the Year	Nominated	
The Streamer Awards	2021	Best Content Organization	Nominated	
The Streamer Awards	2022	Best Content Organization	Nominated	
The Streamer Awards	2023	Best Content Organization	Won	
