= High Times (video game) =

2026 video game

- Developer: Yangyang Mobile
- Publisher: Yangyang Mobile
- Platforms: Windows, Nintendo Switch, Nintendo Switch 2, PlayStation 5, Xbox Series X/S
- Release: July 23, 2026
- Genres: Visual novel, dating sim, simulation
- Mode: Single-player

High Times (marketed as High Times – Dating/Cooking Sim) is a visual novel and dating sim with cooking simulation elements developed and published by the Philippine independent studio Yangyang Mobile. The player takes the role of a "Mood Confectioner" working at The Hotbox, a doughnut shop in the fictional city of San Mazo whose products are infused with mood enhancers that change the emotions of the people who eat them. The game was released on July 23, 2026 for Windows, PlayStation 5, Xbox Series X/S, Nintendo Switch and Nintendo Switch 2.

It is the studio's fifth commercial title, following the narrative games The Letter, Love Esquire, Perfect Gold and Saint Maker, and was financed in part through a Kickstarter campaign in 2024.

== Gameplay ==
High Times alternates between visual-novel dialogue scenes and a doughnut-preparation minigame. Customers visit the Hotbox over a series of in-game days; some order a specific recipe, while others only describe a mood they wish to feel or an ingredient they like, leaving the player to infer a suitable doughnut from the conversation. An assist option allows customers to state their order plainly for players who prefer not to solve the implied puzzle.

Preparation involves frying the dough and then choosing a glaze, filling, icing and toppings. The glaze determines the emotional effect of the doughnut, with flavours mapped to moods such as cheer, sincerity, focus, inspiration and courage; the game includes more than sixty base recipes, four doughnut shapes, nine mood-enhancing flavours and nine topping types, unlocked gradually over the course of the story. Toppings are deducted from the player's in-game funds, so elaborate creations reduce profit, and an incorrect order causes the customer to leave early, cutting short both the payment and the conversation.

Money earned as tips is spent through in-game applications on a tablet, which are used to buy new glazes, equipment and decorations for the shop. Two fictional social-media apps, Facenook and Tender, deliver additional messages from customers and let the player read what the cast posts publicly.

The player character is customised at the start of the game. Character creation offers body types rather than a choice of gender, uses a single androgynous face, and allows any outfit on any body; the protagonist is never referred to by pronouns and every romance is available regardless of appearance. Dialogue choices affect relationship progress and are remembered in later conversations, and several of the romanceable characters have two or three possible endings.

== Premise ==
The game is set in San Mazo, a neon-lit near-future city in which manufactured mood enhancers are an ordinary consumer product. The protagonist works as a Mood Confectioner at the Hotbox doughnut shop. In the opening, a mysterious woman at a bus stop asks the protagonist whether they carry regrets about a past relationship and hints that they may get a second chance; shortly afterwards, five of the protagonist's former partners turn up in San Mazo as regular customers of the shop.

Six characters are romanceable: five exes drawn from different periods of the protagonist's life, plus Connor, a childhood best friend who has never dated them. The exes are MJ, a short-tempered punk musician and the most recent breakup; Lucy, a childhood girlfriend and dedicated fan of Japanese pop culture; Emmette, an overachieving high-school girlfriend who is accompanied by her twin sister Emma; Stacy, a former one-night stand; and Harry Yen, an exacting fellow mood confectioner from the protagonist's college years. More than thirty further customers appear as non-romanceable characters with their own storylines.

== Development and release ==
Yangyang Mobile, founded in 2015 by John and Danni Pineda and based in Metro Manila, had previously released four narrative titles. The studio cited VA-11 Hall-A, Good Pizza, Great Pizza, the Papa's cooking games and Scott Pilgrim as influences on the project.

A free demo was released in September 2024, and a Kickstarter campaign followed on October 22, 2024, seeking US$12,000 principally to fund English voice acting and physical merchandise. The campaign was fully funded within eleven hours and closed with US$52,471 pledged by 1,041 backers, unlocking stretch goals that included expanded character customisation and an additional love interest. The game was initially announced for a 2025 release on PC and mobile devices, with a Nintendo Switch version to follow; it ultimately launched on July 23, 2026 on PC and consoles, with the mobile versions not part of the initial release.

The game is presented in an animated comic-book art style with more than seventy illustrated story panels, and its soundtrack combines rock, city pop and lo-fi tracks. All characters except the player character are fully voiced in English; the cast includes Nola Klop as MJ, LilyPichu as Lucy, Johnny Yong Bosch as Harry, Ciaran Strange as Emmette, Aife as Stacy and Joshua Waters as Connor, alongside Jesse Cox, Erica Schroeder, Kira Buckland, Joshua Seth and Brittney Karbowski in supporting roles. Interface and subtitles are available in English, Simplified Chinese, Traditional Chinese and German, with full audio in English only.

== Reception ==
Reception

Aggregate score
Aggregator	Score
OpenCritic	92% recommend (Note: Based on 12 reviews)

Review scores
Publication	Score
Impulsegamer	4.4/5
Softpedia	8.5/10
Raider King	8.8/10
Screen Hype	8/10
GameBlast	7.5/10

High Times was well received by critics. The review aggregator OpenCritic gave it a Top Critic Average of 84 out of 100 based on twelve reviews, with 92 per cent of critics recommending the game.

Reviewers generally praised the cast, the voice acting and the doughnut-making loop while noting that the cooking itself is simple and repetitive. Skeith Ruch of Raider King, who scored the game 8.8 out of 10, considered the writing engaging enough to compensate for the repetition and recommended it to players wanting sharper humour than most cosy games offer. Cosmin Vasile of Softpedia rated it 8.5 out of 10, writing that the game delivers what its premise promises. Mohamed Aymen Boumia of Just Play It similarly praised the cast, performances and soundtrack while calling the gameplay loop simple and somewhat repetitive.

Lyssa Greywood of Screen Hype scored the game 8 out of 10 and highlighted its gender-neutral character creation and fully voiced supporting cast, but found that the writing takes too long to build emotional investment, that several dialogue choices are ambiguous, and that the absence of manual saves discourages experimentation. Thiago da Silva of the Brazilian outlet GameBlast gave it 7.5 out of 10, criticising an over-reliance on sexual humour and observing that not all of the introduced mechanics and emotional states are meaningfully used. Chris O'Connor of Impulsegamer, who scored it 4.4 out of 5, characterised it as undemanding entertainment with enough variation to support repeat playthroughs.

Estimates of length varied considerably, from roughly fifteen to twenty hours for a single playthrough to fifty hours or more when pursuing all six relationships. Reviewers repeatedly described the game as a notably queer-friendly title, and Screen Hype argued that it had failed to find the audience its ambitions warranted.
