= Graham Stephan =

Real estate investor and YouTuber (born 1990)

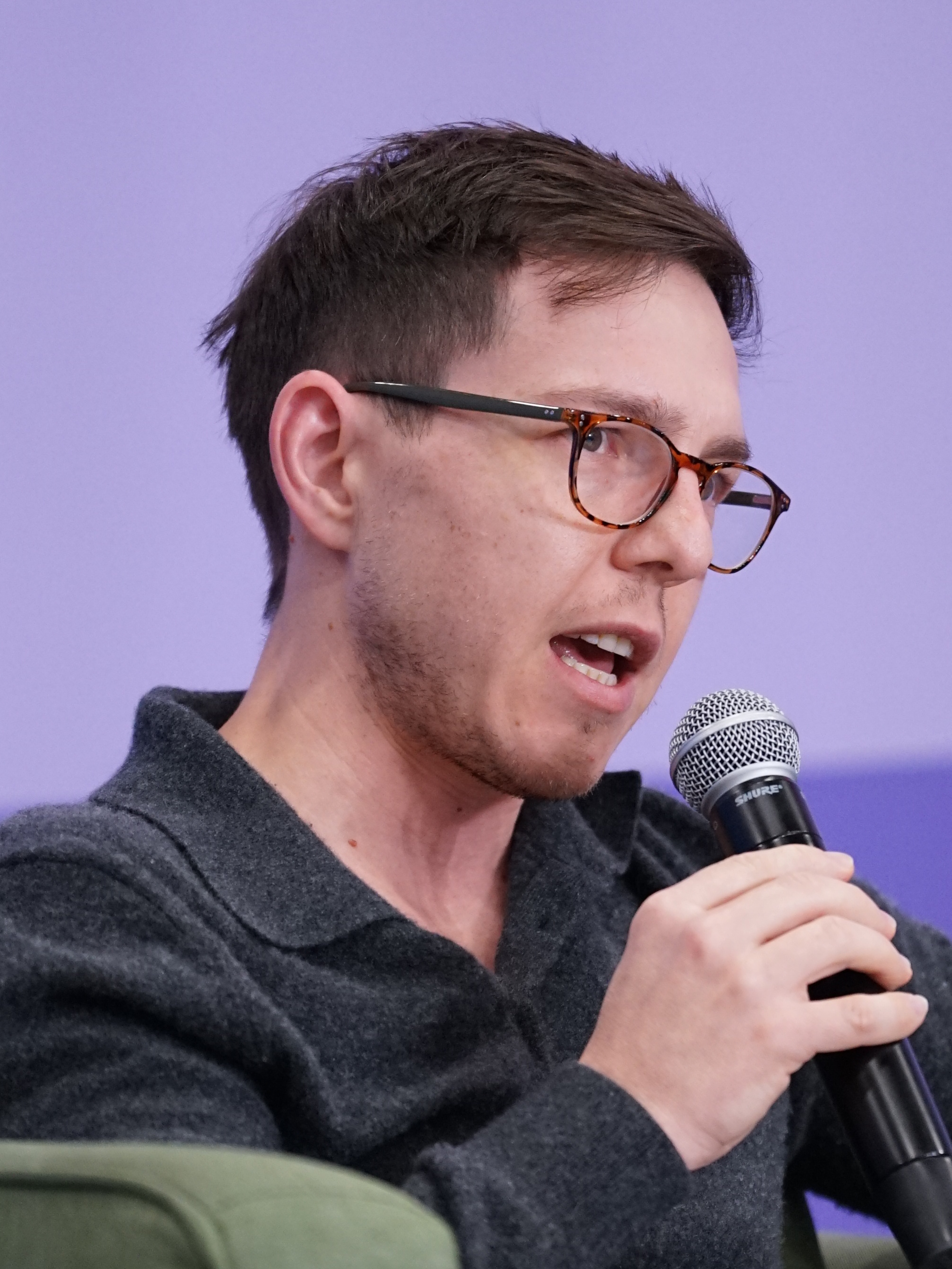
- Stephan in 2026
- Born: 1989 or 1990 (age 35–36); Los Angeles, California, U.S.
- Occupations: YouTuber; financial commentator
- Years active: 2008–present
- Spouse: Macy Savannah (Schmidt) (m. 2024)

YouTube information
- Channel: Graham Stephan
- Subscribers: 5.16 million
- Views: 1.38 billion
- Last updated: April 23, 2026

Graham Stephan (born 1990) is an American real estate investor, YouTuber, and financial commentator. In 2026, his YouTube channel exceeded 5 million subscribers.

== Life and career ==
Stephan was born and raised in Los Angeles. He failed to get into college, leading him to start a career in real estate when he was 18. In 2015, Stephan would become employed by the Oppenheim Group. Stephan began posting content on YouTube in 2016, with a focus on real estate topics and eventually personal finance topics such as budgeting, saving, investing, and planning. By 2019, Stephan had surpassed $1 million in annual income through content creation. In mid-2020, Stephan became dissatisfied with his living situation after being stuck inside amidst the COVID-19 pandemic. He would move to Las Vegas next door to a friend that same year. He also quit his job with Oppenheim Group and began pursuing content creation full-time since it had become more profitable than his realtor job and his move away from California resulted in him losing his realtor's license. His income was $5.1 million in 2020, and was on track to $6 million in 2021 from his online ventures. Half of this came from YouTube ad revenue, while the rest came from sponsorships, and marketing. Stephan received his real-estate license in 2008 and began investing in real estate in 2011. By 2020, Stephan had sold more than $125 million worth of real estate.

=== FTX promotion ===
In March 2023, Stephan was named as a defendant in a proposed class action lawsuit alleging that finance influencers promoted the cryptocurrency exchange FTX prior to its collapse. Stephan released an apology video on the subject, in which he claimed that he did not expect the behavior of FTX and that he had used the platform for his own trading. In May 2025, a federal judge dismissed some of the claims, but allowed certain claims to proceed or be amended.

=== Yotta promotion ===
In 2024, the bankruptcy and shutdown of Synapse Financial Technologies, a fintech intermediary used by multiple consumer finance apps, froze access to funds for many users of partner services. The disruption drew attention to Yotta, a savings app that Stephan had previously promoted to his audience and had publicly described himself as an angel investor. A 2021 article reported that he had announced an equity investment in the company, including in a video titled "I Bought a Bank," which was later removed from his channel.

== Personal life ==
Stephan lives in Las Vegas, Nevada.
