= Disguised Toast =

Taiwanese-Canadian YouTuber (born 1991)

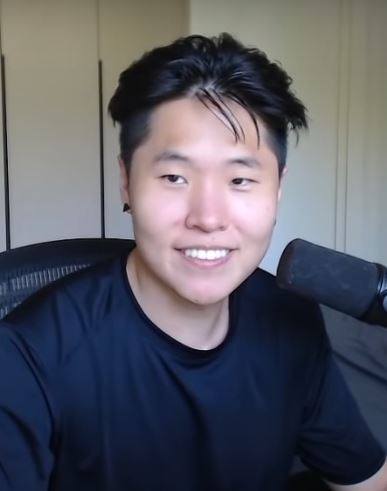
- Wang in 2021
- Born: Jeremy Wang; 25 November 1991 (age 34); Taipei, Taiwan
- Education: University of Waterloo (BSc)
- Occupations: Streamer; gamer
- Years active: 2015–present
- Organization: OfflineTV

Twitch information
- Channel: DisguisedToast
- Genre: Gaming
- Games: Hearthstone; Teamfight Tactics; League of Legends; Among Us
- Followers: 2.9 million

YouTube information
- Channel: Disguised Toast
- Genre: Gaming
- Subscribers: 3.77 million
- Views: 1.59 billion
- Last updated: 23 April 2026
- Website: www.disguised.gg

Jeremy Wang (born 25 November 1991), better known as Disguised Toast, is a Taiwanese-Canadian streamer, YouTuber, and Internet personality. He got his start on YouTube, creating videos about the digital card game Hearthstone. Wang later began streaming on Twitch, before signing an exclusive streaming contract with Facebook Gaming in November 2019. In November 2021, Wang announced his return to streaming on Twitch.

Wang is a member of OfflineTV, an online social entertainment group of content creators.

== Early life and education ==
Wang was born in Taiwan, but his family moved to Penang, Malaysia, before he turned one. Wang's older brother later moved to Canada to attend university, with the rest of his family moving over later, settling in Kingston, Ontario. In 2013, he received his 3-year degree in mathematics from the University of Waterloo after initially majoring in computer science.

Before starting his streaming career, he worked as an app developer for Mercedes Benz, the NFL, the Royal Bank of Canada, and Zynga.

== Streaming career ==
In 2015, Wang began making infographics and YouTube videos in which he showcased unusual card interactions in Hearthstone, shared on the community aggregation site Reddit. Wang covered his face with a toast-shaped cardboard mask until he revealed his face by mistake in October 2016. Wang's username and toast-mask are a reference to a Hearthstone card, SI:7 Agent. When played in-game, the voice line for the card reads "This guy's toast". Comedian Conan O'Brien called it "the greatest name in gaming history."

In March 2017, Wang competed in the ONOG Major Circuit at PAX East. Despite making it into the top 32, he overslept the following morning and was disqualified.

In June 2017, Wang was temporarily banned from Hearthstone for 72 hours in response to an instance in which he showcased an exploit on stream.

It was announced in October 2017 that Wang had joined OfflineTV, a collective of content creators living together in Los Angeles, California.

Wang became known for his Hearthstone streams. In the summer of 2019, he gained a huge following while streaming Riot Games' new game Teamfight Tactics, and another spike during the test phase of Riot's upcoming card game, Legends of Runeterra. During that time, he was the second most-watched streamer on Twitch. By that time, he had 1.3 million followers on Twitch and 950,000 subscribers on his main YouTube channel. In November 2019, Wang signed an exclusive deal with Facebook to move from Twitch to Facebook Gaming for his gaming streams.

In May 2019, Wang was nominated as Twitch Streamer of the Year in the 11th annual Shorty Awards.

In late 2019, Wang turned down an offer from Blizzard in which he was asked to reveal a new card from the Saviors of Uldum expansion, citing his personal feelings on Hearthstone as well as negative community reaction.

In April 2020, Wang returned to Twitch to host a new non-gaming series called "Blind eDating". The series focuses on dating a new girl each week and playing games with them.

Between September 2020 and January 2021, Wang received an influx of more than two million subscribers and 400 million video views on YouTube as a result of a number of his videos based on the game Among Us trending. He has played with a number of notable Twitch streamers, YouTubers, and celebrities in these videos, including PewDiePie, JackSepticEye, Pokimane, Jae Park, Logic, James Charles, Bretman Rock, and Mark Tuan. In late October, Wang participated in an Among Us session on Twitch featuring Democratic politicians Alexandria Ocasio-Cortez and Ilhan Omar to advocate for voting in the 2020 United States presidential election.

On August 12, 2021, Wang appeared in the music video for Sub Urban and Bella Poarch's song, "Inferno".

On November 17, 2021, Wang announced his departure from Facebook Gaming after two years on the platform. A week later on November 24, Wang announced that he would be returning to Twitch.

On January 10, 2022, Wang's Twitch account was suspended for 48 hours for watching the anime Death Note on stream.

On December 11, 2022, Wang participated in Ludwig Ahgren's chess boxing event titled "Mogul Chessboxing Championship" at the Galen Center in Los Angeles, California, U.S. Wang fought and defeated fellow creator PointCrow via checkmate in the sixth round.

On January 8, 2023, Wang announced his professional Valorant team Disguised (DSG), competing in the North American challengers league of the 2023 Valorant Champions Tour. On March 27, 2023, Wang announced an all-female roster of Disguised which would compete in VCT Game Changers, the female Valorant pro circuit.

== Filmography ==
=== Music videos ===
Year	Title	Artist(s)	Role	Notes	Ref.
2020	"if there was a zombie apocalypse i'd let my dog eat me"	LilyPichu	Himself	N/A	
2021	"Inferno"	Sub Urban and Bella Poarch	Bellboy	—N/a	
2021	"Break Out"	MaiR	Himself	OfflineTV's official animated music video	

== Boxing record ==
=== Chessboxing ===
Chess boxing record
1 fight, 1 win (0 KOs, 1 CMs)
Date	Result	Opponent	Event	Location	Method	Round	Time
2022-12-11	Win	PointCrow	Mogul Chessboxing Championship	Galen Center, Los Angeles, California, U.S.	Checkmate	6	
Legend: Win Loss Draw/no contest Notes

== Achievements ==
=== Notable tournament placements ===
Date	Game	Location	Event	Placement	Winnings (US$)
2019-07-04	Teamfight Tactics	Online	TFT Thursday #1	2nd	$2,450
2019-04-02	Apex Legends	Online	Twitch Rivals ALC Rematch Challenge	11th	$1,500
2019-02-19	Apex Legends	Online	Twitch Rivals ALC	6th	$700
2019-01-23	League of Legends	Online	Twitch Rivals: League of Legends Showdown	1st	$2,800
2018-08-25	Fortnite	Online	Fortnite Summer Skirmish	—N/a	$16,200
2018-04-08	Hearthstone	Boston, United States	PAX East GEICO Hearthstone Showdown	3rd	$1,000
2017-04-15	Hearthstone	United States	Red Bull Team Brawl: Spring 2017	1st	$1,500

=== Awards and nominations ===
Ceremony	Year	Category	Result	Ref.
Canadian Game Awards	2021	Best Streamer	Nominated	
Esports Awards	2023	Esports Personality of the Year	Won	
Forbes 30 Under 30	2021	Games	Included	
Shorty Awards	2019	Twitch Streamer of the Year	Nominated	
The Streamer Awards	2021	Best Variety Streamer	Nominated	
The Streamer Awards	2021	Best Strategy Game Streamer	Won	
The Streamer Awards	2023	Best Strategy Game Streamer	Won	

== See also ==
- List of University of Waterloo people
- Taiwanese Canadians
