= LilyPichu =

American online streamer (born 1991)

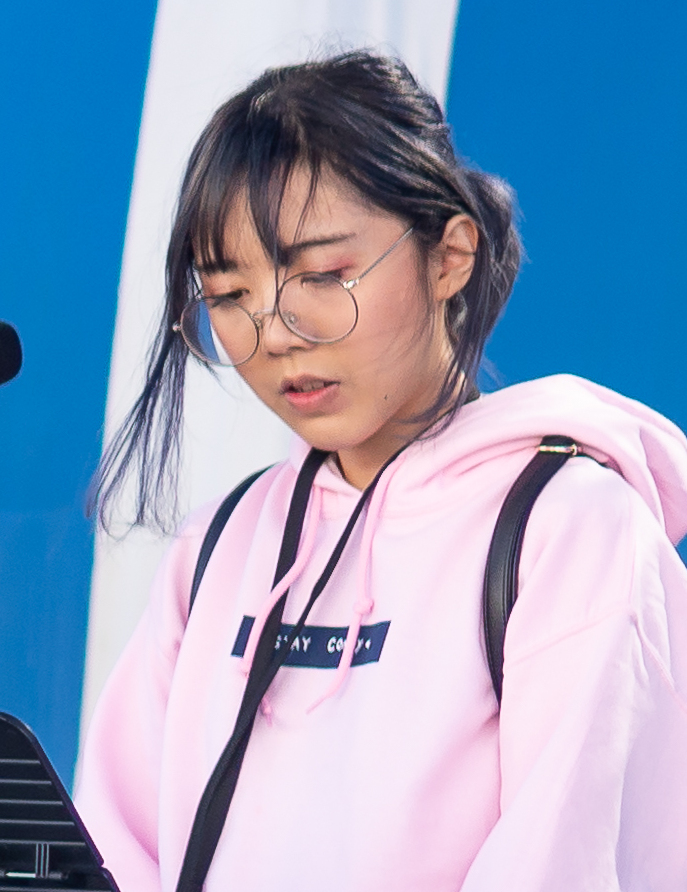
- LilyPichu in 2018
- Born: Lily Ki; November 20, 1991 (age 34); New York City, U.S.
- Occupations: Online streamer; YouTuber; voice actress; artist
- Years active: 2006–present
- Organization: OfflineTV
- Partner: Michael Reeves (2020–present)

Twitch information
- Channel: LilyPichu
- Years active: 2011–present
- Genres: Gaming; music; art
- Followers: 2.4 million

YouTube information
- Channel: LilyPichu
- Genres: Gaming; music; art; vlogging
- Subscribers: 3.08 million
- Views: 646 million
- Last updated: April 14, 2026
- Website: lilypichu.com

Lily Ki (born November 20, 1991), better known as LilyPichu, is an American online streamer, voice actress, artist and YouTuber. She is a member of OfflineTV, an online group of content creators, and was one of the most subscribed female Twitch streamers in the late 2010s and early 2020s. She remains one of the most followed female streamers on the platform. As a voice actress, she plays characters such as the Genshin Impact character Sayu and the English dub voice of Muni Ohnaruto in D4DJ First Mix. Ki began creating videos on YouTube in June 2010 and streaming on Twitch in August 2012. She signed an exclusive contract with YouTube in July 2022, but had returned by July 12, 2024 to Twitch.

== Early life and education ==
Lily Ki was born on November 20, 1991, in Queens, New York. Her family lived in The Bronx before moving to North Jersey. She is of Chinese descent, and has a brother named Daniel. Ki grew up in a musical household and began playing the piano at a young age, but she also had an interest in art and illustration. She received an associate degree in Arts and Music at a community college.

== Career ==
Ki's content includes gaming, art, and music. She first gained popularity in 2011 when her parody song "I'll Quit LoL" went viral on YouTube. In 2015, she made her musical debut with the release of her extended play Lilies. In July 2017, Ki played the melodica to unsuspecting cosplayers at PopCon Indy, such as "Let It Go", in a video. That same month, she joined OfflineTV, an online social entertainment group of content creators. In September 2018, Riot Games launched a series of ads on YouTube for League of Legends which featured Ki and other content creators.

Ki was the fifth most-watched female Twitch streamer in 2020. In 2020, she was nominated for the Shorty Award for Twitch Streamer of the Year. In 2021, Ki appeared in the music video for Bella Poarch and Sub Urban's song "Inferno", where she cameoed alongside several other content creators. At the 1st Streamer Awards in 2022, Ki was nominated for Best League of Legends Streamer and Best Music Streamer, winning only for Best Music Streamer.

In July 2022, Ki announced that she had signed exclusively with YouTube and stopped streaming on Twitch, but returned to Twitch by July 12, 2024.

In 2023, Ki was part of the ensemble voice cast for Third Eye, an Audible Original scripted fantasy comedy created by Felicia Day.

== Personal life ==
In 2018, Ki began dating YouTuber Albert Chang, better known as Sleightlymusical, and in 2019, they separated after he cheated on her. On February 21, 2020, Ki confirmed on a livestream that she was dating fellow OfflineTV member Michael Reeves.

On June 27, 2020, Ki and Yvonne "Yvonnie" Ng, the OfflineTV house manager, wrote about the sexual misconduct from former OfflineTV member Federico Michael Gaytan, also known as Fedmyster, stating that he would enter her room uninvited and make inappropriate advances on her. As a result, Gaytan was removed from OfflineTV.

== Discography ==
=== Studio albums ===
Year	Title	Details	Ref.
2025	ivory lilies	Released: June 29, 2025; Label: comfi beats; Formats: Digital download, streaming	

=== Extended plays ===
List of extended plays, showing year released and formats
Year	Title	Details	Ref.
2015	Lilies	Released: September 10, 2015; Label: Self-released; Formats: Digital download, streaming	
2025	flower biome	Released: September 3, 2025; Label: comfi beats; Formats: Digital download, streaming	

=== Singles ===
==== As a lead artist ====
List of singles, showing year released and producers
Year	Title	Details	Ref.
2020	"comfy vibes"	YouTube Release Date: April 11, 2020; Producers: Marc Straight & Richard Rodriguez	
2020	"dreamy nightmares"	YouTube Release Date: May 5, 2020; Additional Credits: Michaela Nachtigall (violin); Producer: Marc Straight	
2020	"foreverland"	YouTube Release Date: May 19, 2020	
2020	"sunshine & butterflies"	YouTube Release Date: May 23, 2020; Producer: Vedra	
2020	"wilting memories" (with Jun Sung Ahn)	YouTube Release Date: June 2, 2020; Additional Credits: Jun Sung a.k.a. JuNCurryAhn (violin)	
2020	"a vision"	YouTube Release Date: June 21, 2020	
2020	"unknown waters"	YouTube Release Date: June 24, 2020	
2020	"a stormy night" (with TJ Brown)	YouTube Release Date: July 1, 2020	(Note: Made this piece in collaboration with @LilyPichu, inspired by Avatar: The Last Airbender. tjbrownmusic. Published Date: 2020-07-02. Retrieved 2021-11-21.)
2020	"these days it's hard to find the words"	YouTube Release Date: July 19, 2020; Producer: Vedra	
2020	"dreamy night"	YouTube Release Date: September 1, 2020; Additional Credits: Zorsy (piano), Megan Shipman & Rezyon (background vocals); Producer: Rezyon	
2020	"if there was a zombie apocalypse i'd let my dog eat me"	YouTube Release Date: November 1, 2020; Additional Credits: TJ Brown & JohnOfTheForest (background vocals); Producers: TJ Brown & JohnOfTheForest	(Note: if there was a zombie apocalypse i'd let my dog eat me. lilypichu. Published Date: 2020-11-01. Retrieved 2021-11-21.)
2020	"walking with you"	YouTube Release Date: December 14, 2020	
2021	"POM POM" (with VGR)	YouTube Release Date: May 24, 2021; Producer: VGR	
2021	"last cup of coffee"	YouTube Release Date: August 9, 2021; Producer: JohnOfTheForest	
2021	"summer nights"	YouTube Release Date: October 19, 2021; Producers: Daryl Barnes & Falconshield	
2022	"lilypad"	YouTube Release Date: March 18, 2022; Producer: TJ Brown	
2022	"not too late"	YouTube Release Date: August 14, 2022; Producer: Falconshield	
2022	"happy"	Youtube Release Date: August 22, 2022; Producer: Farhan Sarasin	
2022	"anemo sky"	Youtube Release Date: October 19, 2022; Producer: Daryl Barnes	
2023	"my own"	Youtube Release Date: March 5, 2023; Producer: Falconshield	
2023	"disappear" (with VGR)	Youtube Release Date: June 15, 2023; Producer: VGR	
2023	"waiting for a sign"	Youtube Release Date: July 19, 2023; Producer: TJ Brown	
2023	"ceiling fan"	Youtube Release Date: August 25, 2023; Producer: Farhan Sarasin	
2023	"breathe"	Youtube Release Date: September 25, 2023; Producer: Biango, TJ Brown	
2023	"starsmitten"	Youtube Release Date: October 26, 2023; Producer: TJ Brown	
2024	"hyacinth" (with StreamBeats)	Youtube Release Date: February 14, 2024; Producer: StreamBeats	
2024	"blue heart"	Youtube Release Date: May 3, 2024; Producer: Jorgen Odegard	
2024	"into dust"	Youtube Release Date: August 8, 2024; Producer: JohnOfTheForest	
2024	"jellyfish"	Youtube Release Date: October 31, 2024; Producers: WD, Lotus Flow & Shawn Halim	
2025	"sherbet sky"	Youtube Release Date: February 15, 2025; Producer: TJ Brown	
2025	"happy ~ lofi"	Youtube Release Date: February 24, 2025; Producer: Farhan Sarasin	
2025	"Never Have I Ever" (with QuarterJade & Yvonnie of OfflineTV)	Youtube Release Date: April 26, 2025; Producer: Nmore	
2025	"train of thought" (with VGR & Oxlo)	Youtube Release Date: October 17, 2025; Producers: VGR & Oxlo	
2025	"c'est la vie"	Youtube Release Date: November 20, 2025; Producer: Farhan Sarasin	
2026	"our perfect moment"	Youtube Release Date: February 14, 2026; Producer: Biango	

==== As a featured artist ====
List of singles, showing year released and select information
Year	Title	Details	Ref.
2021	"Pre-Parade" (with AmaLee)	YouTube Release Date: January 9, 2021; Anime (Toradora) English song cover	(Note: Nightmares!. lilypichu. Published Date: 2021-10-09. Retrieved 2021-11-21.)
2021	"Summertime" (with Natsumiii)	YouTube Release Date: May 25, 2021; Original song cover	
2021	"Nightmares" (with Static-P)	YouTube Release Date: October 9, 2021	

== Filmography ==
=== Film ===
Year	Title	Role	Notes	Ref.
2021	Belle	Additional voices	Voice; English dub	
2022	The Seven Deadly Sins: Grudge of Edinburgh Part 1	Kulumil	Voice; English dub	

=== Television ===
Year	Title	Role	Notes	Ref.
2020	Zo Zo Zombie	LiliPichu	Voice; English dub	(Note: Zo Zo Zombie! LILY PICHU becomes the World's Best ZOMBIE Rock Star! on YouTube Retrieved on 2021-11-23.)
2021	Tonikawa: Over The Moon for You	Reporter and cashier	Voice; English dub; Ep. 7	
2021	D4DJ First Mix	Muni Ohnaruto	Voice; English dub	
2021	Cardfight!! Vanguard: Overdress	Megumi Okura	Voice; English dub	
2021	Welcome to Demon School! Iruma-kun	Miki	Voice; English dub	
2022	Don't Toy with Me, Miss Nagatoro	Yoshi	Voice; English dub	
2022	Players	Herself	Web series	
2023	The Misfit of Demon King Academy	Lena	Voice; English dub	
2023	Mashle	Love Cute	Voice; English dub	
2023	My Love Story with Yamada-kun at Lv999	Princess Ruri	Voice; English dub	
2024	Kimi ni Todoke	Chigusa Takahashi, additional voices	Voice; English dub	
2025	Witch Watch	Nico Wakatsuki	Voice; English dub	
2026	FX Fighter Kurumi-chan	Mebuki Yamashi	Voice; English dub	

=== Video games ===
Year	Title	Role	Notes	Ref.
2013	Champions of Chaos 2	Mage		
2019	Arcade Spirits	Juniper		
2020	Ethereal Enigma	Mina	English dub	
2021	Phantom Breaker: Omnia	Rin	English dub	
2021	Eternal Return: Black Survival	Eleven	English dub	
2021	Genshin Impact	Sayu	English dub	
2021	Cookie Run: Kingdom	Onion Cookie	English dub	
2021	Paladins	Salt Io	English dub	
2022	Phantom Breaker: Omnia	Rin/system voice	English dub	
2022	Legends of Runeterra	Disciple of Doran	English dub	
2022	Omega Strikers	Juno	English dub	
2024	Arknights	U-Official	English dub	
2024	Fears to Fathom: Woodbury Getaway	Nora Kim		
2024	MiSide	Tiny Mita/Sleepy Mita/Mila	English dub	
2024	Guardian Tales	Cornet	English dub	
2025	Rhythm Doctor	Hailey	Level 6-1 and finale only	
2026	lily's world XD	Lily		
2026	Overwatch	D.Mon		
2026	High Times	Lucy	Main Role	
TBA	Emberville	Unannounced role	In production	

=== Music videos ===
Year	Title	Artist(s)	Ref.
2021	"Inferno"	Bella Poarch and Sub Urban	
2021	"Break Out"	MaiR	
2025	"Wall"	Good Kid	(Note: Voice only, voice of Mimi)

== Awards and nominations ==
Award	Year	Category	Result	Ref.
Shorty Awards	2020	Twitch Streamer of the Year	Nominated	
The Streamer Awards	2021	Best Music Streamer	Won	
The Streamer Awards	2021	Best League of Legends Streamer	Nominated	
The Streamer Awards	2024	Best Fighting Games Streamer	Nominated	
The Streamer Awards	2025	Best Fighting Games Streamer	Won	
