= PointCrow =

American internet personality (born 1998)

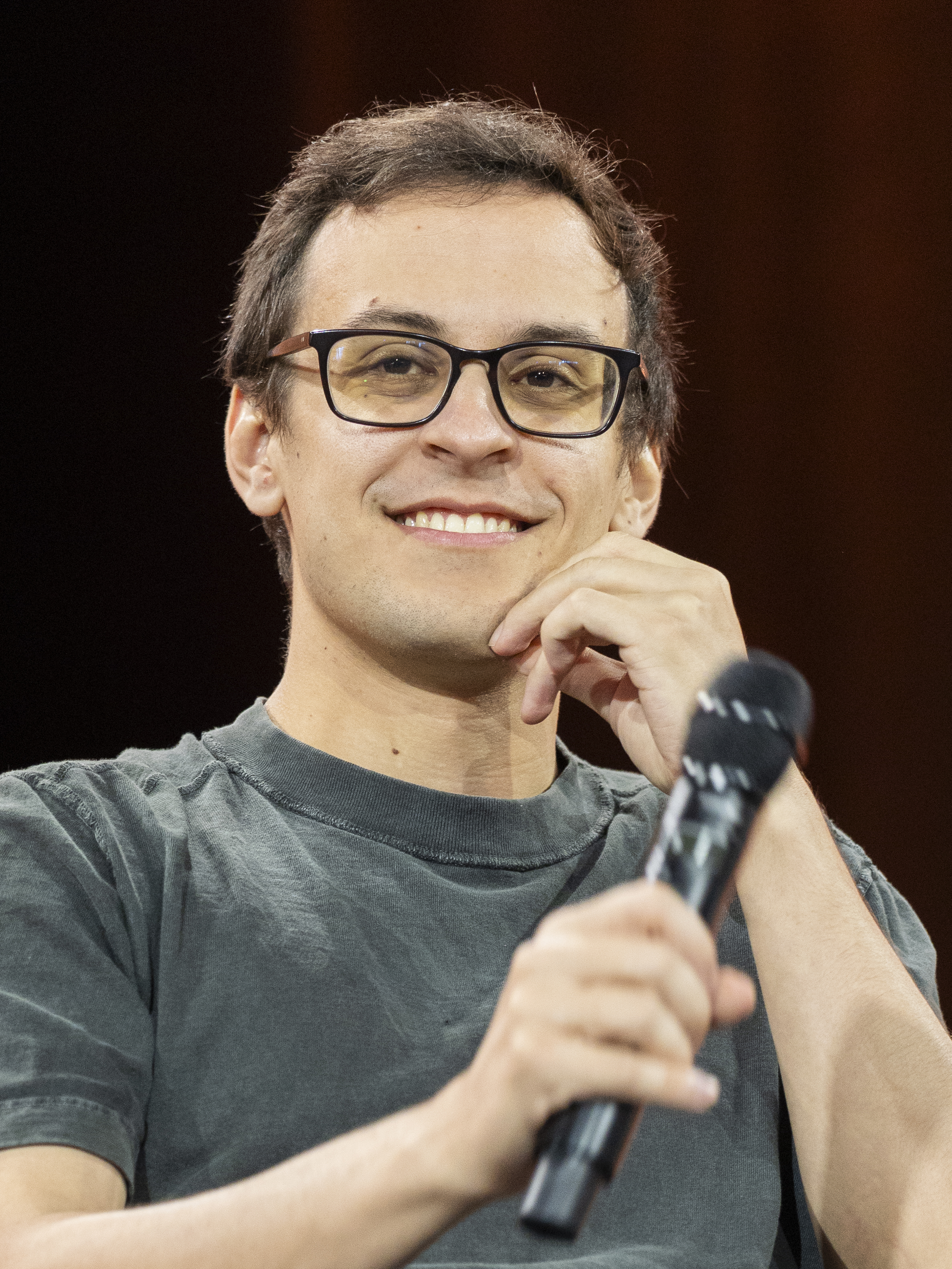
- PointCrow in 2026
- Born: Eric Morino; January 21, 1998 (age 28)

Twitch information
- Channel: PointCrow
- Games: The Legend of Zelda: Breath of the Wild; Pokémon
- Followers: 2.79 Million

YouTube information
- Channel: PointCrow
- Years active: 2019-present
- Genre: Gaming
- Subscribers: 2.8 million
- Views: 789.96 million
- Last updated: September 11, 2026

Eric Morino (born January 21, 1998), better known online as PointCrow, is an American YouTuber and Twitch streamer. He is known for online content surrounding video games—most notably The Legend of Zelda: Breath of the Wild and The Legend of Zelda: Tears of the Kingdom—and other real life productions. He has completed several challenges based around Breath of the Wild and has received media attention for offering a $10,000 USD bounty to whoever created a mod that allowed the game to be played in online multiplayer. The mod was released on April 4, 2023, and some of Morino's videos making use of it were issued YouTube copyright strikes by Nintendo shortly after.

== Internet career ==
In September 2019, Morino completed The Legend of Zelda: Breath of the Wild while only making use of shields. In February 2020, he organized a tournament in which 20 live streamers raced to complete a Breath of the Wild speedrun in which the player must feed all 16 dogs in the game as fast as possible, with the winner being awarded $1,000 USD. On March 6, 2020, he completed Breath of the Wild while prohibiting Link, the game's player character, from being able to walk. A week later, he held a livestream in which roughly 600 concurrent viewers completed Breath of the Wild in a format evocative of Twitch Plays Pokémon, though Morino occasionally offered assistance to his viewers. After struggling with burnout, Morino decided to expand his focus beyond just Breath of the Wild into both a variety of games and real life content in early 2020, though he continued to make content based around Breath of the Wild.

Eric Morino has also created content based around video game mods—in July 2020, he played through a compilation of 30 different Breath of the Wild mods, and in that October, he created a version of Breath of the Wild in which every enemy was replaced with the one considered the most difficult by fans. In November 2020, he announced that he would be offering a $10,000 USD bounty to anyone able to create a mod that allowed Breath of the Wild to be played in online multiplayer, with several limitations, including that it must be completed before the release of the game's sequel, and that he must be given exclusive access for a short period of time before the public release.

On April 4, 2023, eight months after Morino released the first video demonstrating the multiplayer mod, it was released for free to the public. The development of the mod was financed by Morino in addition to the bounty payout, and Morino served as a creative director of the project, according to one of its developers. Shortly after the public release of the mod, Breath of the Wild owner Nintendo issued YouTube copyright strikes and copyright claims to Morino's videos based around the multiplayer mod, as well as those utilizing other mods. (Note: According to Morino, one video issued a copyright claim did not involve any mods) In response, Morino delisted the multiplayer mod from public download. In a statement, Morino claimed that the removed videos did not breach Nintendo's guidelines on creating content based on their games, nor did it violate the principle of fair use.

Morino (left) speaking with DougDoug (right) at Open Sauce in July 2026

Morino's videos are frequently based around concepts popularized by others with his own ideas, such as edited videos of fan games to differentiate himself from other Let's Play videos. He has further implemented random elements to pre-established challenges, including a Nuzlocke Challenge of a Pokémon video game, a subathon with a randomized timer, or a Breath of the Wild version of the "Minecraft Manhunt" series created by Dream and Wilbur Soot. After the release of Pokémon Scarlet and Violet in November 2022, he uploaded a video of the games in which he showcased many of the games' exploits and glitches. During Ludwig Ahgren's chess boxing event on December 11, 2022, Morino fought fellow content creator Disguised Toast, in which Morino lost by checkmate.

== Awards and nominations ==
Year	Ceremony	Category	Nominated work	Result	Ref.
2022	The Streamer Awards	Best Speedrun Streamer	—N/a	Won	
2022	The Streamer Awards	Best Streamed Event	"PointCrow Party"	Nominated	
