= Social entertainment =

Type of entertainment

Social entertainment are forms of entertainment that involve attending public venues, but do not involve significant physical activity, such as spectator sports or going to the theatre.

== Typology ==
In leisure studies, social entertainment is counterposed to active leisure, which are leisure activities involving physical exertion, and passive leisure, which are forms of entertainment that can be enjoyed from home. Examples of social entertainment include spectator sports, going to the movies, or going to concerts.

=== Online social entertainment ===
Although the use of physical public spaces is the defining feature of social entertainment, the use of social media and massively multiplayer online games have been described as online forms of social entertainment.
