= Livestream from Hell =

Film by David Janoff

- Promotional release poster
- Directed by: David Janoff
- Written by: Biniam Bizuneh; Kevin Hart
- Produced by: Kevin Hart; Kai Cenat; Druski; Luke Kelly-Clyne; Aaron Edmonds; Harold Berón III; Michael D. Ratner
- Starring: Kevin Hart; Kai Cenat; Druski
- Cinematography: Dominic Easter
- Edited by: JJ Terry; David Janoff
- Music by: Dillon Baldassero; Gavin Brivik
- Production companies: Amazon MGM Studios (via Prime Video); HartBeat Productions
- Distributed by: Amazon MGM Studios (via Prime Video)
- Release date: September 29, 2026
- Running time: 85 minutes
- Country: United States
- Language: English

Livestream from Hell is a 2026 horror comedy film directed by David Janoff and written by Biniam Bizuneh and Kevin Hart. The film stars Hart, Kai Cenat, and Druski as fictionalized versions of themselves who try to solve a series of murders that happens during their livestream.

Livestream from Hell was released on Prime Video on September 29, 2026.

== Plot ==
On a video call, Kevin Hart tells his business partner he hopes his upcoming 24-hour livestream with Kai Cenat and Druski will help launch his streaming career.

When Kai Cenat and Druski arrive at his residence, Hart immediately kicks out their cameraman and tells them AI will operate all aspects of the stream. They begin the stream with Hart giving a tour of his mansion, during which he introduces them to Willie, a tenant who lives there. Winnie Harlow arrives, and they watch a horror movie. Rayasianboy pranks them with a chainsaw, enraging Winnie and causing her to storm off. Their next segment, a baking show with Jerry O'Connell, ends poorly due to Druski and Kai's antics. The stream is suddenly swatted, but the officers recognize Hart and gleefully take a selfie with him before leaving.

Hart, Kai, Druski, AMP, and Kel Mitchell have a segment where they beat Willie using pool noodles. Afterward, Hart retrieves their DoorDash order and invites Kai and Druski's cameraman back in. While eating, they tease Kel for his fading career. Kel suddenly leaves, and Hart hears a loud crash from his living room. Kai and Druski's cameraman runs away after seeing what caused it. Hart finds Willie's bloody body and covers the camera. After the AMP members leave, he shows Kai and Druski Willie's body, disturbing them. Hart mutes the stream and orders them to dispose of Willie. While doing so, Hart hosts segments with Marshawn Lynch and Sexyy Red. The AI moderator takes control of the stream, showing footage of Willie being assaulted by a hooded figure. Privately, Hart tells Kai that he will stop the stream and call the police after a game of pop the balloon with La La Anthony. Anthony leaves, angered by Hart wasting her time.

Shortly after, the lights begin flashing red as the contestants are murdered. Hart attempts to play it off, leading to an argument with Kai. Ray, Fanum, and Duke Dennis walk in and quickly flee after seeing the bodies. Hart and Druski chase after them while Kai plays off the murders as a prank to the chat. Dennis locks himself in a room and is killed by the hooded figure. Hart emotionally decides to continue after receiving a donation with a supportive message. Kai accuses Hart of being behind the murders, which Hart denies, and convinces them to look for the murderer.

The three go into the living room and find Fanum's body before being chased by the murderer into the basement. The murderer reveals himself to be Kel, who recites their teasing and accuses streamers of taking jobs from actors. Kai sides with Kel, chastising Hart and Druski for overlooking him. Before Kel can kill them, he is apprehended by SWAT, whom Kai and Druski's cameraman called. Hart praises Kai's acting skills that delayed Kel from killing them. Afterward, they discuss the night's events. A DoorDash order arrives for Willie, revealing he is still alive.

In a mid-credits scene, an anonymous user donates with a message stating that Kel was only a pawn in a game that has only started.

== Cast ==
- Kevin Hart as himself
- Kai Cenat as himself
- Druski as himself
- Kel Mitchell as himself

Several members of the AMP House, including Duke Dennis, Rayasianboy, and Fanum are featured in supporting roles. Guest appearances by Roll Tide Willie, Marshawn Lynch, Sexyy Red, Jerry O'Connell, Winnie Harlow, and La La Anthony as themselves are made. Additionally, SNL star Kam Patterson appears as a DoorDash driver.

== Production ==
Livestream from Hell was officially announced on September 30, 2025 by Kai Cenat and Kevin Hart during their Mafiathon 3 subathon, where they played a one-minute teaser for the film.

== Release ==
The film was released on September 29, 2026 on Prime Video without a prior announced release date. Three days later, on October 2, 2026, Dash of a Lifetime, a short-film starring Kam Patterson portraying his DoorDash character, released on both Hart's LOL! Network and Patterson's YouTube channels.
