= Streamer University =

Reality streaming show created by Kai Cenat

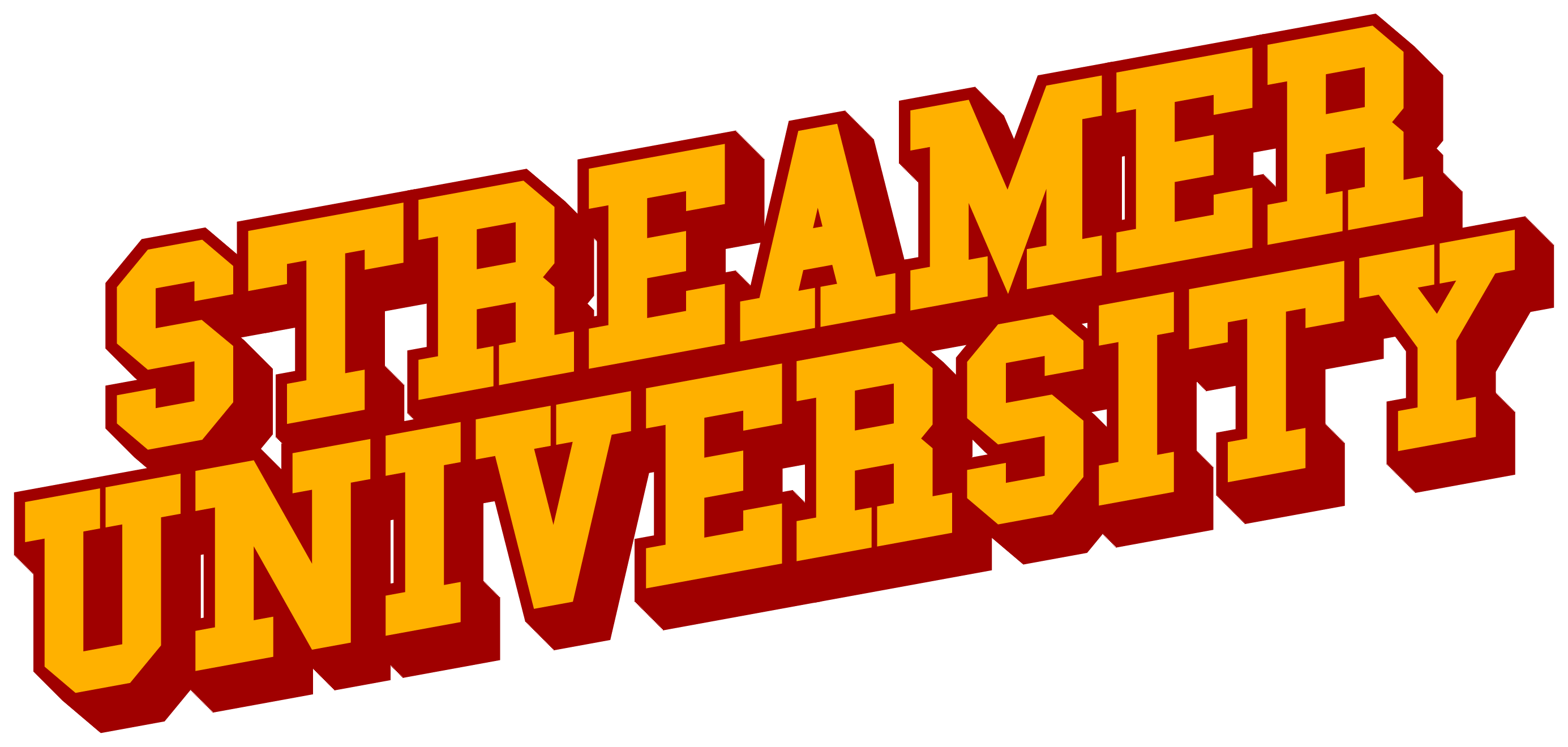
- Date: May 22–25, 2025; July 15–20, 2026
- Location: University of Akron, Akron, Ohio, US (2025); Hendrix College, Conway, Arkansas, US (2026)
- Organized by: Kai Cenat
- Website: streameruniversity.com

Streamer University
- Genre: Web show, reality show
- Created by: Kai Cenat
- Country of origin: United States
- Original language: English
- No. of seasons: 2

Production
- Production locations: University of Akron, Akron, Ohio (season 1); Hendrix College, Conway, Arkansas (season 2)

Original release
- Release: May 22, 2025

Streamer University is a multi-day reality streaming show run by American online streamer which features an in-person boot camp for content creators of the same name ran by Kai Cenat as the dean of the school. The inaugural three-day event was hosted at the University of Akron in 2025. A second installment was held from July 15 to July 20, 2026, at Hendrix College in Conway, Arkansas. Following the conclusion of the 2026 event, Cenat announced that the third installment of Streamer University will be hosted in Europe.

== Background and concept ==
Kai Cenat is an American online streamer, YouTuber, and internet personality and is the most-subscribed and most-followed Twitch streamer in the world.

Streamer University is described as a "live-streamed creator bootcamp" by Complex; run by American streamer and internet personality Kai Cenat where students would learn about content creation. In February 2025, during a live stream, Kai Cenat posed the idea of renting out a university for the weekend to help streamers with their careers. Cenat wanted to act as principal and have other big names teach classes.

During another live stream in early May 2025, Cenat announced Streamer University, stating he is "going to rent out a university over a course of a weekend" stipulating, "no matter if you’re big, no matter if you’re a small streamer, you can stream the entire weekend."

The University of Akron agreed to make its campus available for Cenat's event. Brandon Alexander, who is the director of conference and event services at the university, pointed out that having large-scale events is part of the aim to serve the people in Akron through the university and present itself as a place which holds major conferences. These events may also have other economic benefits.

== Launch and timeline ==
=== Streamer University 2025 ===
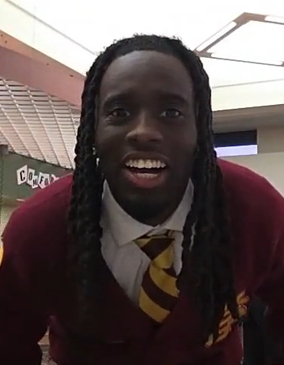
Organizer Kai Cenat during the inaugural Streamer University event at the University of Akron in May 2025

On May 6, 2025, Cenat posted on X an announcement trailer featuring visuals similar to the Harry Potter movies to enroll. Within minutes of opening the applications, reportedly 1 million applications were submitted. Within hours of launching the website, Cenat shared that the site had crashed due to receiving over 6 million requests. On May 18, Cenat handpicked the student streamers and professors, some including his friends, such as 2xRaKai, Rayasianboy, and MC Tota.

Streamer University was hosted at the University of Akron in Akron, Ohio. The event lasted three days, from May 22, 2025, to May 25, 2025. Streamer University had 17 professors and 120 students, each gifted a personal T-Mobile phone from sponsorship. The event's opening stream, titled "Orientation/Move-In Day," amassed over 10 million views. During the event, on May 25, a female student got an eye injury from an Orbeez gun.

Before ending Streamer University, an award ceremony was hosted, including awards for "Worst Behavior", "MVP," and "Best Roommates." The event was commemorated by Canadian musician Drake.

=== Streamer University 2026 ===
During Cenat's Mafiathon 3 (2025), he revealed that Streamer University would be coming back in 2026, mentioning that preparation was in progress. Cenat officially opened applications for Streamer University 2026 on June 8, marking the end of his hiatus. (Note: Some sources state Cenat's hiatus was eight months long, while others state it was nine.) The Streamer University trailer for 2026 noted that a "selected alumni will return" for this second installment. The application process for the 2026 event allowed individuals to apply under three distinct roles: students, who attend to develop content creation skills; professors, who teach specific areas of expertise; or club directors, who oversee extracurricular activities. The 2026 application pool attracted interest from numerous established content creators, including food critic Keith Lee, internet personality Mike Holston, shooting coach Lethal Shooter, and music artists Cleotrapa and Sugarhill Ddot.

Following the online rollout, Cenat announced an in-person application tour across three major cities: New York City on June 12, Los Angeles on June 14, and Atlanta on June 16. The first stop on Manhattan's West Side drew massive crowds on 11th Avenue and West 58th Street, requiring intervention from the New York City Police Department to manage the crowds and monitor the area via helicopter. Atlanta auditions for Streamer University were scheduled for June 16, 2026, but were cancelled the day before due to capacity concerns. According to Newsweek, the situation was further complicated by a reported bomb threat scare, contributing to heightened safety concerns and the eventual cancellation. Crowds nevertheless gathered at the original neighborhood venue, which the Atlanta Police Department described as "large unpermitted gathering." Seven people were arrested over June 15 and 16 on charges including disorderly conduct, obstruction, and battery on law enforcement officers. Cenat later announced that the auditions would be rescheduled for June 17 at State Farm Arena.

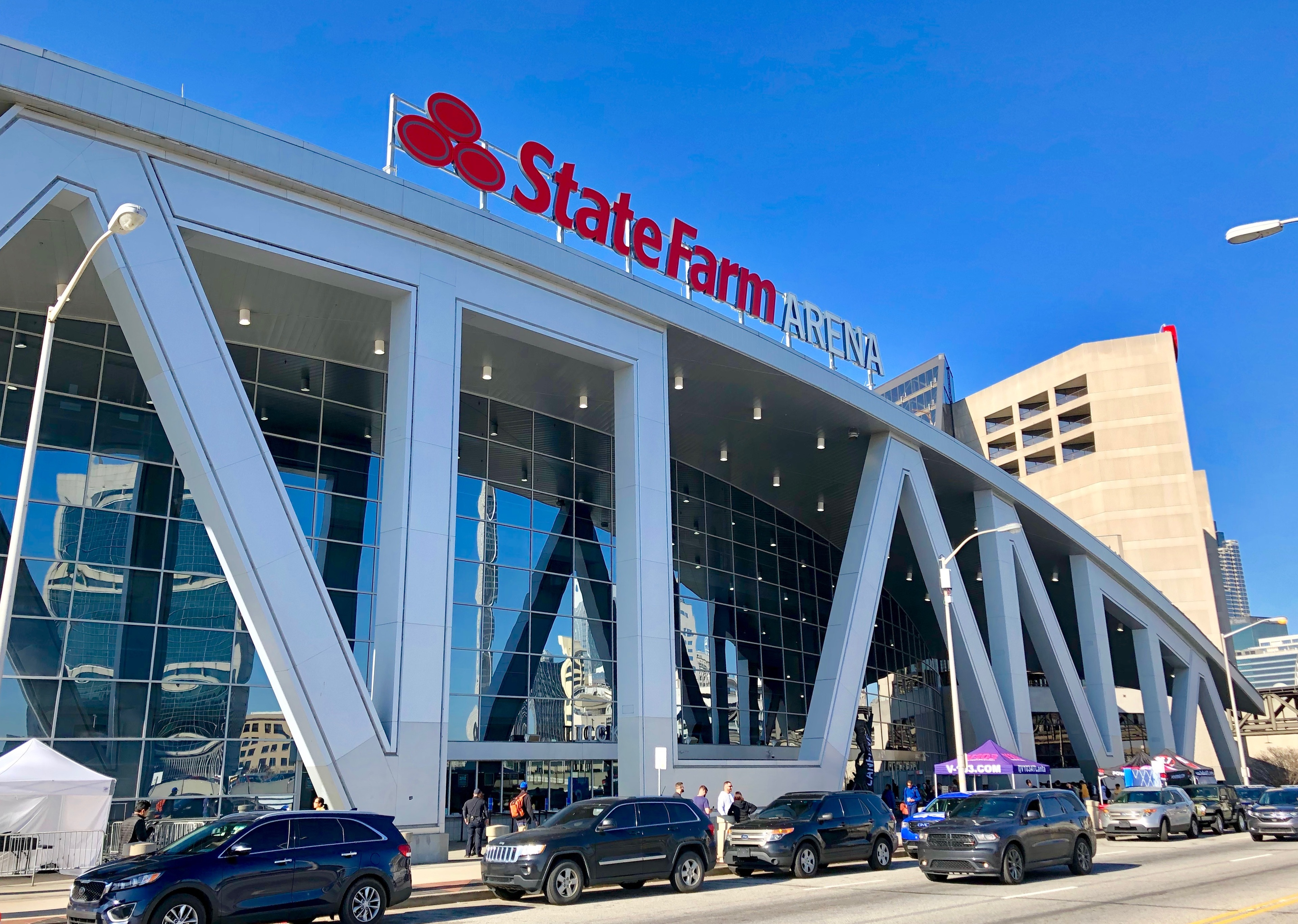
State Farm Arena (pictured in 2019), where the rescheduled Atlanta auditions were shut down due to safety and crowd control concerns

According to CBS News, the situation later escalated further when the event at State Farm Arena also drew a large crowd, prompting the police to monitor crowd control and publicly address viral misinformation that circulated online. Due to an overwhelming surge of people, State Farm Arena officials and police were forced to shut down the event entirely on the same day. On July 6, 2026, Cenat announced accepted students on a live stream for Streamer University 2026. He also stated that Streamer University will happen "every goddamn year for as long as I am alive." On July 13, 2026, Cenat posted another Harry Potter-inspired trailer for Streamer University.

The second installment of the event started on July 15, 2026 which took place at Hendrix College in Conway, Arkansas. The participants of the event were welcomed by Drake through a video. Content creators were given a Chatmobile phone through a sponsorship. On July 17, Cenat announced that Streamer University alumni would be arriving at Hendrix College to join the class of 2026. Following the conclusion of the 2026 event on July 20, 2026, Cenat announced that the third installment of Streamer University will be hosted in Europe.

== Controversy ==
=== Gottfried v. Night Media, Inc. et al. ===
In June 2026, a federal lawsuit was filed in the United States District Court for the Southern District of New York against Kai Cenat LLC and Night Media by attendee Caleb Gottfried (born September 16, 2006), widely known as SNVRK /snɑːrk/. Initially granted in forma pauperis status by Chief Judge Laura Taylor Swain, the case was subsequently assigned to District Judge Dale E. Ho, with general pretrial matters referred to Magistrate Judge Robert W. Lehrburger. The ongoing litigation stems from crowd safety and right of publicity disputes during the Manhattan in-person auditions for the second season of Streamer University, held at John Jay College of Criminal Justice.

==== Plaintiff ====
The plaintiff, Caleb Gottfried, is an American scientist, executive, and experimental musician recording under the name SNVRK. As a former affiliate of Playboi Carti's OPIUM label in 2024 and current creative assistant at AWGE, Gottfried released his debut 11-track studio album, SNVRKOLEPSY, on June 5, 2026, exactly one week before attending the in-person Streamer University auditions in Manhattan.

Kai Cenat pictured in a black & gold Streamer University varsity jacket walking towards the John Jay College of Criminal Justice.

==== Background and incident ====
On June 12, 2026, live-streamer Kai Cenat and management company Night Media by association held in-person auditions in Manhattan, New York City, for the second season of Cenat's creator bootcamp project, Streamer University. Held at the John Jay College of Criminal Justice, the free event drew a massive crowd full of aspiring content creators, with some attendees, including Gottfried, camping out overnight to secure a place in line.

The audition event attracted significant crowd density and public interest, requiring monitoring by officers from the New York City Police Department (NYPD). The event formed part of a series of large-scale public gatherings organized by Cenat that have previously raised public safety and crowd control concerns, including an August 2023 Union Square gathering that resulted in civil unrest charges and a later June 2026 auditions event at State Farm Arena that was shut down by local authorities due to safety risks.

==== Claims and relief sought ====
The lawsuit outlines two main causes of action:

- Premises liability and negligence: The complaint alleges that severe overcrowding, inadequate physical ventilation, and lack of standard crowd control measures caused Gottfried to experience two near-heatstroke medical episodes during the Manhattan auditions. The filing notes that responding NYPD officers witnessed the conditions.
  Crowd conditions while waiting for Kai Cenat to arrive
- Misappropriation of likeness: Claims brought under New York Civil Rights Law §§ 50 and 51, alleging that video footage of Gottfried was featured as "background talent" in commercial promotional advertisements for Streamer University without his written consent, liability release, or compensation.

The plaintiff is seeking over $330,000 in compensatory and statutory damages.

=== Property destruction ===
During Streamer University 2, videos circulated on various social media platforms of messy dorm rooms of various streamers, streamers damaging furniture owned by Hendrix College, and food fights at the campus. Local community members and users on social media began voicing concerns over reported property damage and vandalism at the campus. Despite the damage done to the campus, Hendrix College considered the event a "success".

== Reception and impact ==
After Streamer University ended in 2025, it had reached a total of 27 million watch hours on Twitch, according to Tubefilter, and 23 million according to People. In 2026, Cenat's first post-hiatus stream announcing the participants peaked at 1 million viewers. The impact that Streamer University had on streamer participants were significant growth. Media outlets reported that major streaming platforms like Netflix and Amazon Prime showed interest in obtaining the distribution rights for Streamer University. However, those offers were rejected. Cenat also stated that he and his team were working on "owning the idea of" Streamer University, stating that it "was so big that [he] had to take legal action into owning the idea, owning the name, and making it [his]."

=== Competition and related projects ===
On June 9, 2026, after Cenat announced Streamer University 2026, American rapper Soulja Boy wrote on Twitter, "If you don't let me in Streamer University @KaiCenat we beefin. I let u slide the first time." The next day, Soulja Boy announced a project called Rapper University, a "competition" to Streamer University, on Twitter. The post included an AI-generated image that depicted him standing in front of a university campus. On July 8, Soulja Boy announced that he was postponing Rapper University due to an overwhelming number of applications he received.

== Faculty ==
Streamer University Faculty (2025–2026)
Name	Platform / Notable For	Role(s) & Year(s)	Notes	Ref(s)
Ludwig Ahgren	YouTube	Professor (2026)		
Rachell "Valkyrae" Hofstetter	YouTube	Professor (2026)		
T-Pain	Twitch / Music	Musical Arts Professor (2026)		
Lizzo	Music	Professor (2026)		
Din "Agent00" Muktar	YouTube / Twitch	Professor (2026)		
Alexander "Adapt" Hamilton	YouTube / Twitch	Professor (2026)		
Duke Dennis	YouTube / Twitch	Professor (2026)		
Josh "YourRAGE" Maynard	Twitch	Guidance Counselor (2026)		
The Sushi Dragon	Twitch	Professor (2026)		
Brittany "Cinna" Lynn Watts	Twitch	Professor (2026)		
Poudii	YouTube	Professor (2026)		
Kaiya Cenat	TikTok / YouTube	Professor (2026)		
Imane "Pokimane" Anys	Twitch	Professor (Announced, Did Not Attend) (2026)	Initially announced as faculty but stepped down due to the death of her grandfather.	
Maya Higa	Twitch / Conservation	Professor (Announced, Did Not Attend) (2026)	Withdrew due to a scheduling conflict with a prior wildlife conservation commitment involving sperm whales.	

== Students ==
Notable Streamer University Students (2025–2026)
Name	Year(s) Attended	Notes	Ref(s)
Skai Jackson	2026		
Queen Naija	2026	Attended alongside her husband, ClarenceNYC	
DreamDoll	2026		
Roberto "Fanum" Burgos	2025, 2026	Returned to campus as alumni to mix with the 2026 class. Led the Streamer University Police Department.	
Maxwell Elliot "PlaqueBoyMax" Dent	2026		
Kylie "Sketch" Cox	2026		
Rani "StableRonaldo" Netz	2026		
Jason "JasonTheWeen" Nguyen	2026		
Quvon "2xRaKai" Linder	2025, 2026	Returned to campus as alumni to mix with the 2026 class.	
Chen-Rui "Ray" Hsu	2025, 2026	Returned to campus as alumni to mix with the 2026 class.	

== Awards and nominations ==
Awards and nominations for Streamer University
Ceremony	Year	Category	Result	Ref.
The Streamer Awards	2025	Best Streamed Event	Won	
The Streamer Awards	2026	Best Streamed Event		
