= 2023 Union Square riot =

Riot in Manhattan, New York

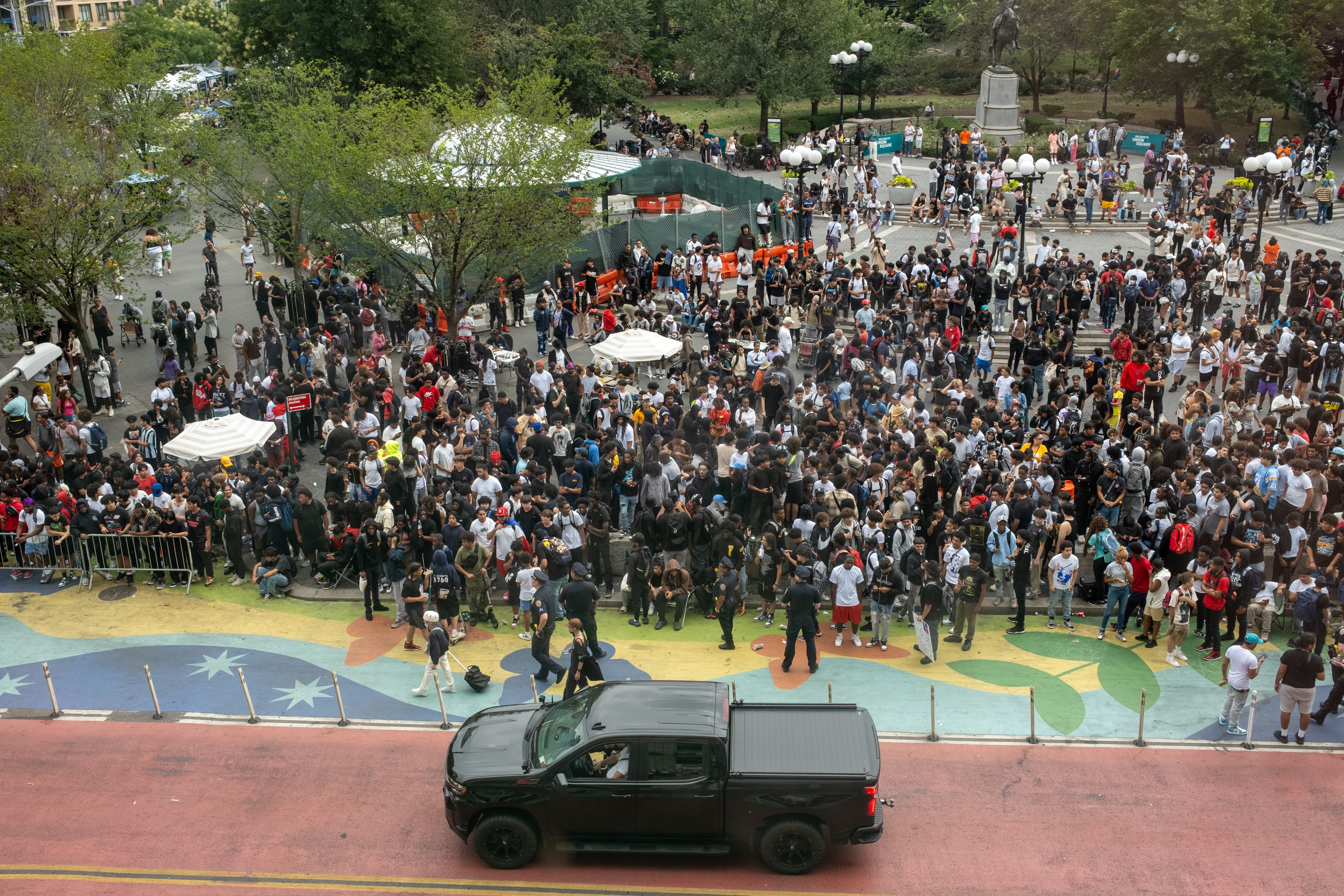
- Crowd awaiting the arrival of Kai Cenat at Union Square
- Date: August 4, 2023 c. 3:00 p.m. – 5:30 p.m. (UTC−4:00)
- Location: Union Square, Manhattan, New York, US; 40°44′9″N 73°59′28″W
- Caused by: Lack of city permit for large gathering
- Goals: Unplanned giveaway of gaming-related items
- Methods: Public gathering, social media promotion
- Result: Dispersed: Kai Cenat arrested and charged with inciting a riot. Later released on the same day; AMP apologises on August 5; Kai Cenat apologises on August 9 on a Twitch livestream and on May 7 2024 on Snapchat; Charges dropped in May 2024 after restitution and the 2024 public apology

Parties
Any Means Possible (AMP): Supporters and Fans of Kai Cenat	Law enforcement: New York Police Department; Metropolitan Transportation Authority

Lead figures
Kai Cenat (Arrested) Fanum; Duke Dennis	Jeffrey Maddrey

Number
3,000–5,000 (estimated)	1,000 (estimated)

Casualties and losses
7 injuries 66 arrested	7 injuries (including 3 officers)

Injuries
- Arrested: 65 (including 30 juveniles)
- Charged: 1 (Kai Cenat; charges later dropped)
- Fined: $55,000 (Cenat), $1,049.50 each (Dennis & Din)
- Cenat's charges were dropped after he paid restitution and issued a public apology in 2024

On August 4, 2023, at approximately 3:30 p.m., American Internet personality Kai Cenat held an unpermitted event—a giveaway of gaming-related items in New York City's Union Square, accompanied by partners Fanum, Duke Dennis, and Agent00 from the AMP collective. Attendees who correctly answered questions about YouTube and live streaming were eligible for prizes. The event drew thousands to Union Square Park and escalated into a riot with clashes between police and crowd members. Social media posts of the event surfaced around the same time. Seven people were injured, and 65 people—including 30 minors—were arrested. The 14th Street–Union Square subway station and surrounding businesses were temporarily closed.

Cenat was taken into custody by the New York City Police Department and charged with inciting a riot and unlawful assembly. Charges were later dropped after he paid $55,000 in restitution. His business partners at AMP apologized, and Cenat publicly apologized in a live stream on August 9. The incident drew national media attention in publications such as NPR and Wired about the influence of Internet personalities.

== Background ==
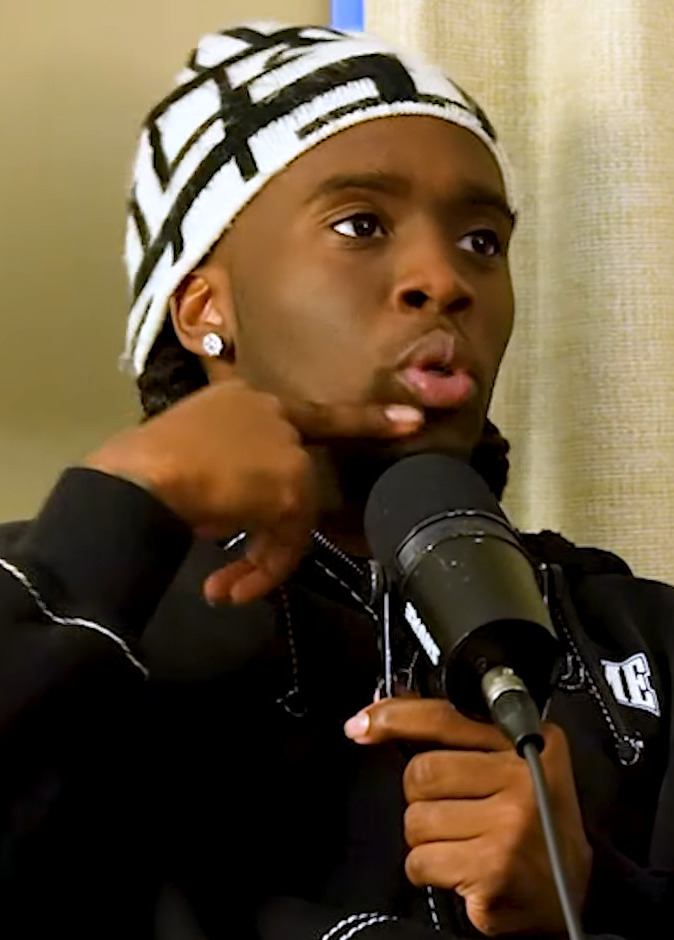
Kai Cenat in 2023

Kai Cenat is an American live streamer and YouTuber. He attended Frederick Douglass Academy and the State University of New York at Morrisville, before dropping out. Cenat joined a group of Internet personalities called Any Means Possible (AMP) in 2020. The following year he gained popularity after producing a series of live streams with Drake, 21 Savage, and Lil Uzi Vert. In February 2023, the United Talent Agency announced they would represent Cenat during his subathon (a continuous live stream in which a new subscriber extends a descending timer). At the end of the live stream, he had amassed 300,000 Twitch subscribers, a record for the platform. As of August 2023, Cenat had a combined 11.1 million followers across YouTube and Twitch.

=== AMP ===
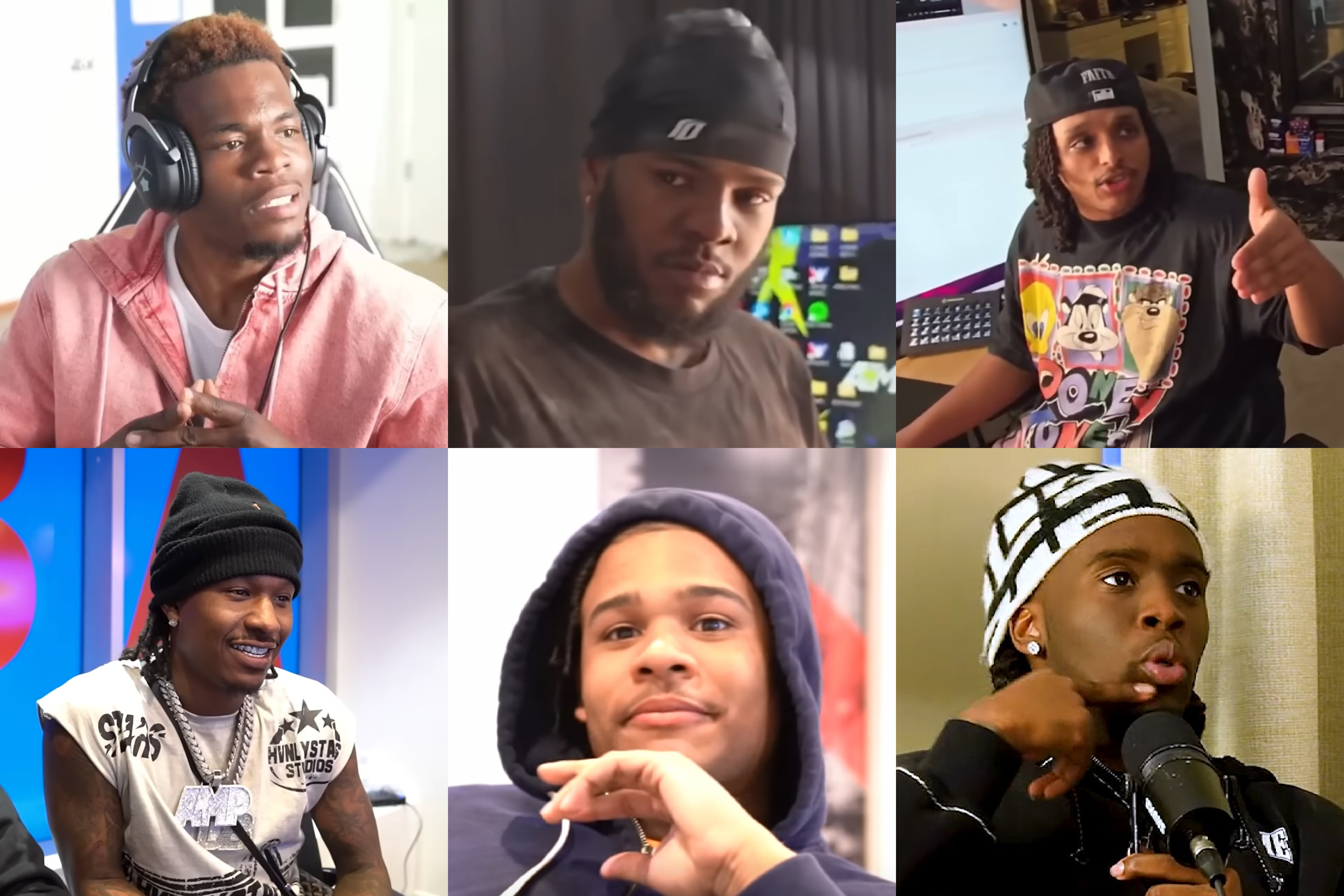
AMP members, top left to bottom right: ImDavisss, Chrisnxtdoor, Agent00, Duke Dennis, JustFanum, and Kai Cenat

AMP (Any Means Possible) is a Twitch and YouTube collective consisting of Twitch streamers, influencers and internet personalities Kai Cenat, ImDavisss, Chrisnxtdoor, Fanum, Duke Dennis, and Agent00. The group streams various games on each members' Twitch accounts, as well as making challenge, gaming, and vlog videos.

=== Planning ===
In the days preceding the August 4 gathering, Cenat announced that he would give away PlayStation 5 consoles at 4 p.m. in Union Square along 14th Street, where he would be joined by Fanum, Duke Dennis, and Agent00, three Twitch streamers. All four men are members of AMP. Despite not securing a permit, Cenat announced on August 2 that he would give away gaming-related items to attendees who correctly answered questions about YouTube and live streaming. The announcement video garnered over 2 million views by August 4. He posted on Twitter that the live stream would begin at 3:30 p.m. In a livestream, Cenat told followers to meet across the street from the Whole Foods on 14th Street and referred to the giveaway with some irony as the "'stay off the streets and go stream' project."

== Riot ==
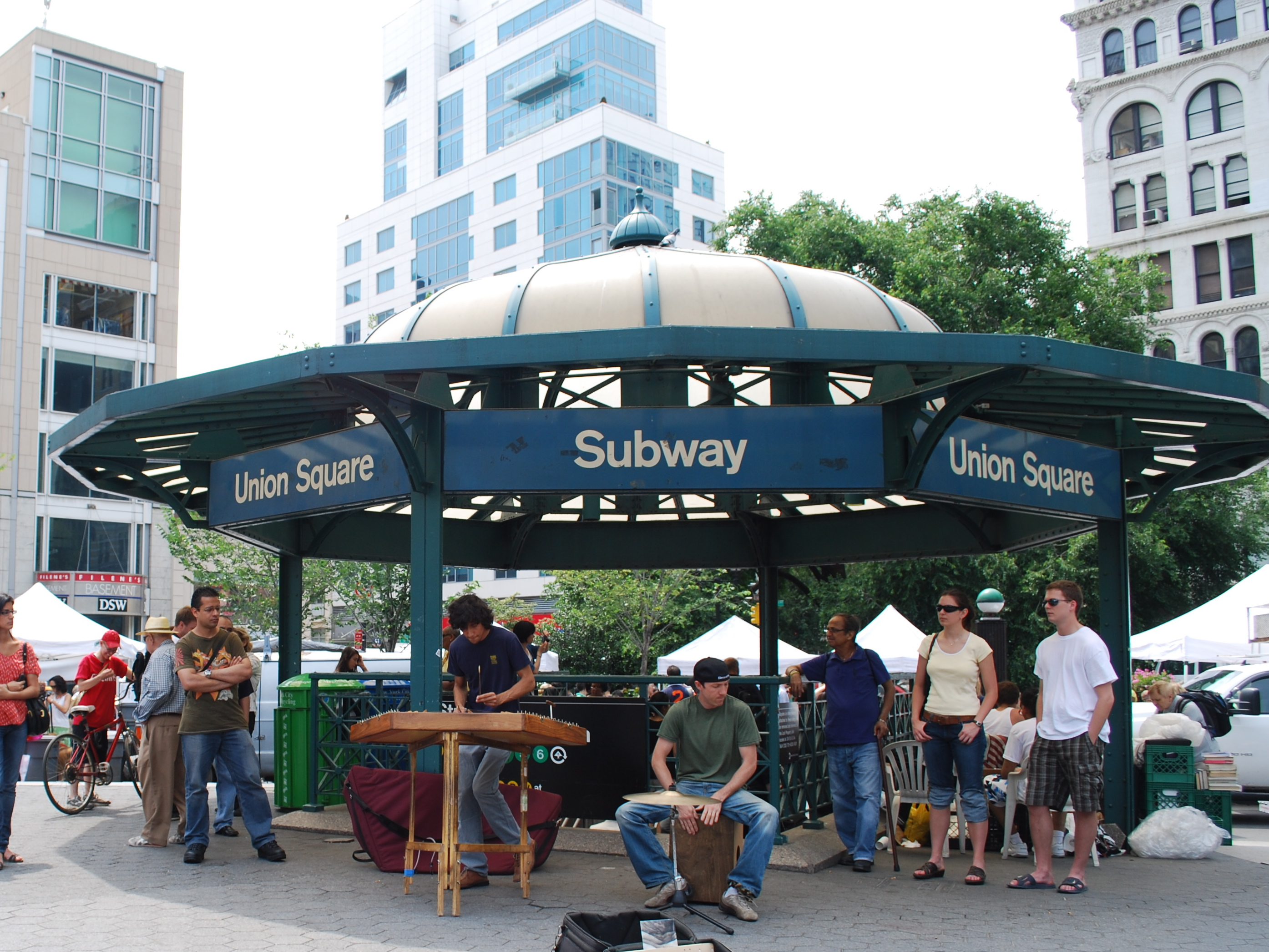
14th Street–Union Square station entrance

External videos
- Chaos erupts in NYC at Twitch streamer Kai Cenat's giveaway — FOX 19 video published on August 4, 2024

By 3 p.m. on August 4, 2023, a large crowd—including many people who were drawn to the event—had gathered in Union Square. Initial estimates from police put the crowd at 3,000 to 5,000 people. The New York City Police Department (NYPD) became aware of the gathering as dozens of people began converging. The NYPD had mobilized officers to the area. The crowd took down barriers and conflict broke out between police and members of the crowd. Some people climbed on a gazebo, vehicles, and a statue of George Washington, threw bottles at officers and objects at vehicles. Witnesses described a frightening scene, with one bystander recalling that he fell due to a bad knee and was trampled. "Everybody started running and going crazy," he said. "Everybody started running over me. I couldn't help it...I was scared." Another witness, Lisa Swan, noted the surreal sight of a young man climbing a streetlight, saying, "He looked like Spider-Man." Social media posts of the riot surfaced at the same time. According to the NYPD, individuals walked around with shovels and axes taken from a nearby construction site, while others lit fireworks. A CBS New York helicopter captured a man discharging a fire extinguisher on a crowd of people. The crowd was estimated at 3,000 to 5,000 people, with some attendees running and trampling others amid sounds resembling gunfire. The unrest was not contained to the park itself. Many attendees moved onto the surrounding avenues, with a large group descending on Park Avenue "like a snow squall, swinging traffic cones, climbing street poles and jumping on outdoor dining structures", according to CBS News. Some individuals reportedly took plates and knives from people dining outside and threw them at officers.

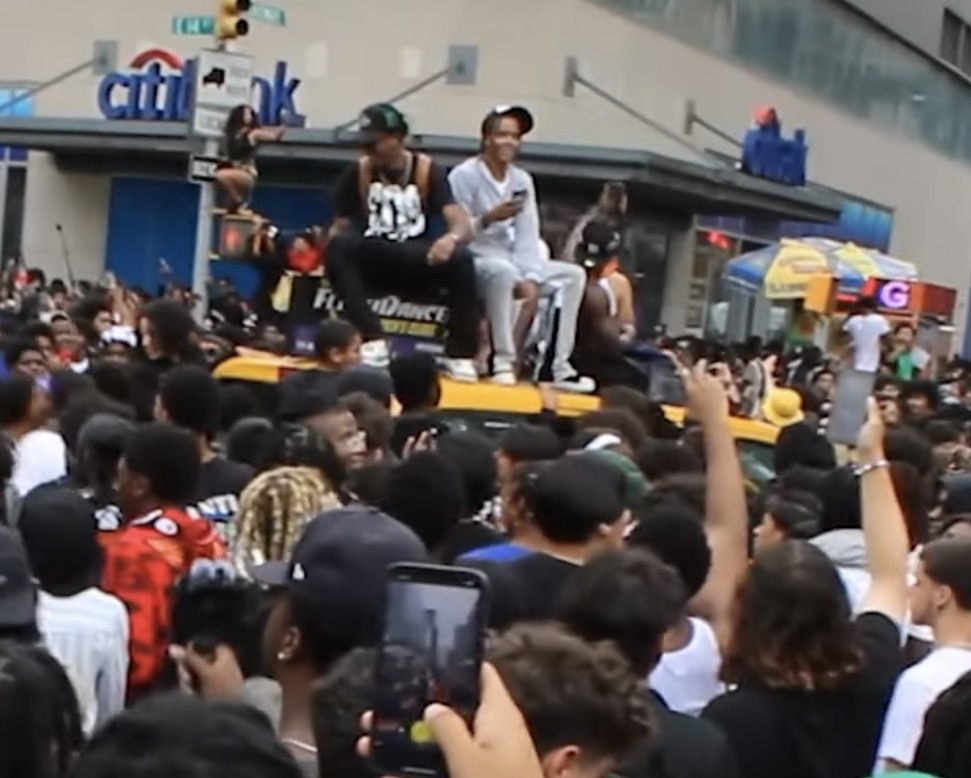
A large crowd gathered in Union Square, Manhattan; two individuals sit on a vehicle while a woman stands on the traffic light

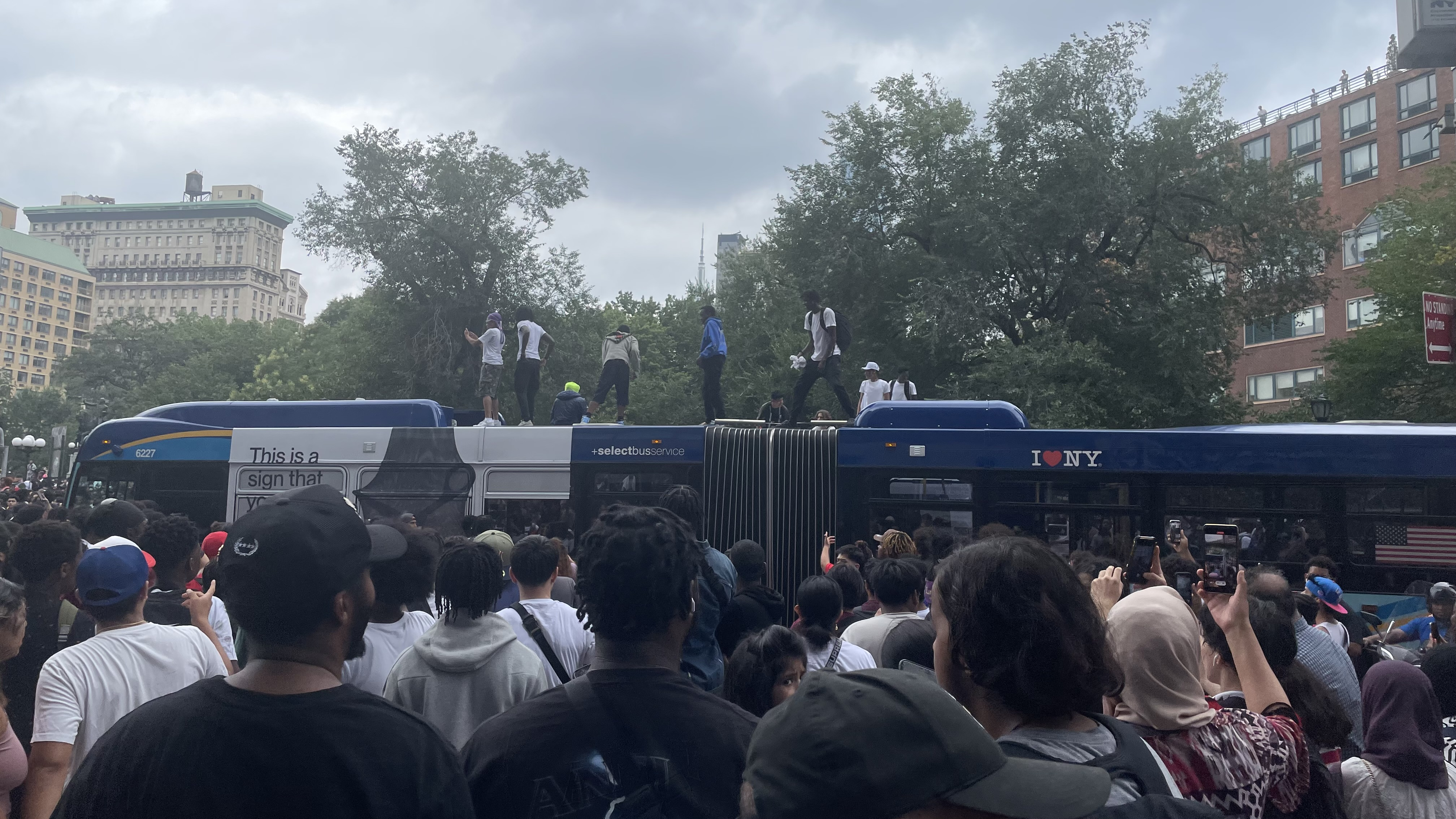
Participants climbing and standing on an M14 bus during the riot

The incident drew attention to Cenat's prominence on Twitch, with some media outlets referring to him as the "King of Twitch." The NYPD mobilized about 1,000 officers—the department's highest response level—to the scene.The department's Entertainment Unit and Intelligence Division first became aware of the event around 12:45 p.m., deploying officers from the local precinct and Manhattan South Patrol Borough to monitor it initially. In addition to the ground response, the department deployed drones and its aviation unit to monitor the situation from above. The Metropolitan Transportation Authority (MTA) had subway trains bypass the 14th Street–Union Square station. An SUV presumed to carry Cenat fled the scene at high speed, with fans clinging to it, causing several to fall. A nearby Best Buy and an eyeglass shop locked their doors. The Union Square Greenmarket continued operating for a time, with one reporter noting that people "still have to get their produce, I guess." (Note: The stores closed on their own while the station had to shut down due to police activity in the area.) At least two thousand people came to the event. Cenat livestreamed from a black SUV, displaying $100 gift cards and urging the crowd to stay safe amid the growing police presence. He claimed officers were deploying tear gas, though none was reported. Exiting the vehicle, he was swarmed by fans before police escorted him away. At approximately 5:00 p.m., Cenat was released on his own accord after being charged with inciting a riot and unlawful assembly. (Note: Some sources describe an immediate arrest; others note release on recognizance.) By 5:30 p.m. the number of participants had begun to decrease with the police eventually blocking the entrances to Union Square. A witness, Josh Ortiz from Brooklyn, attended to see Cenat, noting the event 'wasn't planned well' and suggesting a more open area could have prevented chaos. In an Instagram live stream from a police car, Cenat told the crowd to go home. A total of seven people were reported injured. Among the police, a sergeant suffered a broken hand, one officer was hit in the head with a paint can, and another was punched in the face after being struck by a glass bottle. NYPD Chief Jeffrey Maddrey noted that he himself was hit with multiple objects while in the crowd. Among the civilians, a 17-year-old was hospitalized for injuries sustained from a firework, and Maddrey observed others "bleeding from their heads" or suffering from panic and asthma attacks. The crowds obstructed both vehicular and pedestrian traffic, leading to the NYPD's Level 4 mobilization. Police filled an MTA bus with detainees; 65 people at the event were arrested, including 30 juveniles. The bus was attacked by other people attempting to free those on board. In a press conference, Chief Maddrey claimed that multiple police cars and food carts had been destroyed.

== Aftermath ==
At a press conference, Maddrey stated: "When I go back later on this evening, I will have an after-action determine exactly what our steps were. We can't allow this to happen again in the future". New York City Mayor Eric Adams praised police for their "quick work" in dispersing the crowd. In a statement on August 5, Cenat's streaming group AMP apologized for the riot. The perspective of many fans at the event differed from the official narrative. One attendee explained the massive turnout as an expression of support for the streamer, stating, "Kai Cenat said pop out and that's what the city did. That's how we show love!" On August 9, Cenat made his first public appearance after the riot in a live stream, holding up a New York Daily News issue, apologizing, and announcing that he would take a break from live streaming. He said that he was "beyond disappointed in anybody who became destructive that day". He acknowledged the scale of his reach, stating, "After Friday, I've come to realize the amount of not only power but influence that I have on people."

The incident became an Internet meme. Rapper Offset criticized the police for arresting Cenat. In a YouTube video posted in June 2025, Mayor Eric Adams appeared with Cenat, encouraging him to hold another giveaway but to do so "the right way" by coordinating with the city for permits and law enforcement. Cenat acknowledged that he had "learned from" the 2023 incident and understood his level of influence.

=== Legal proceedings ===
Cenat appeared in court on August 16, following his release from police custody on August 4. He appeared in court again on August 18. On May 21, 2024, the Manhattan District Attorney's office announced that Cenat would not face any charges for the riot. They claimed that he had already paid $55,000 in restitution to the Union Square Partnership, the neighborhood's nonprofit organization for economic development. Denzel Dennis (Duke Dennis) and Din Muktar (Agent00), two other people connected to the incident, each paid $1,049.50 to the group. The combined amount of $57,099 was meant to compensate for damage and staff hours needed in the riot's aftermath. The District Attorney's office dismissed the case on May 22, 2024.

== Analysis ==
Following the event, Mayor Adams stated in a press briefing that "children cannot be raised by social media", while researcher Megan Moreno stated in an NPR interview that the incident "does speak to how much investment people can place within these parasocial relationships". NYPD Chief of Department Jeffrey Maddrey acknowledged the unique challenge posed by social media influencers, stating that the police department needed to improve its outreach. "If we knew about this, we could've had the barriers out here, we could've had police officers out here, we could've did this orderly," he said, emphasizing the event was not sanctioned by the city. Former NYPD sergeant Dr. Keith Taylor noted that the police response was different from past events like the 2020 George Floyd protests, reflecting new training on how to handle large-scale incidents without escalating them unnecessarily. In a Wired article comparing the event to similar Internet-based incidents, University of Sydney digital culture lecturer Mark Johnson opined on the effect of social media (such as the interactivity of Twitch) on the relationships between streamers and their fans. Johnson described the occurrence as an example of "emergent behavior", where Internet users transition from interacting online to entering the real world. The article also claimed that Cenat was "the first Twitch streamer to be charged with inciting a riot". The specific appeal of Cenat to his young, diverse fanbase was also noted as a factor. Keith Dorsey, founder of the media company Young Guns Entertainment, explained that a generation of Black and brown youth saw themselves reflected in Cenat. "When you have a regular individual, a regular person, a young person who just goes online and blows up, it reaches them a little differently," Dorsey said.

Writing for Psychology Today, Pamela B. Rutledge stated: "Young people are volatile and not forward-thinking. It is not surprising that an unplanned crowd of teens turned unruly, even ugly." She felt that the response from Mayor Adams was more political and less realistic, as the rioting crowd's actions were not just a parenting issue, but an issue that also stemmed from digital illiteracy. Bailey Calfee of Campaign noted that a lack of prior planning and the risks of running an in-person event contributed to the riot. In a New York Times article, Keith Dorsey, founder and chief executive of Atlanta-based Young Guns Entertainment, stated that Cenat's management team should try to discuss with authorities the next time he organizes an event. He speculated that Cenat most likely did not know that the event was going to end up in a disaster.

== See also ==
- List of incidents of civil unrest in the United States
