= Vivet =

American clothing brand

Vivet Apparel LLC
- Main logo since 2025
- Trade name: Vivet
- Type: Private
- Industry: Fashion, streetwear
- Founded: December 6, 2025; 10 months ago
- Founder: Kai Cenat
- Headquarters: Atlanta, Georgia, United States
- Key people: Kai Cenat
- Website: www.vivetofficial.com

Vivet Apparel LLC (doing business as Vivet) is an American streetwear company established in 2025 by American online streamer Kai Cenat. The brand, announced in 2025, held its first fashion show on September 12, 2026.

The name Vivet is Latin for "he, she, or it will live".

== History ==
Cenat announced the brand through a post on his alternate Youtube channel "kai's mind" on December 6, 2025.

== Fashion shows ==
Vivet debut its first collection during New York Fashion Week on September 12, 2026. The event, held at Cipriani in Lower Manhattan, was live streamed to over 180,000 viewers on streaming platform Twitch. Celebrities in attendance included Lauryn Hill, Jaden Smith, Luka Sabbat, and Law Roach, while fellow streamers Duke Dennis, Rayasianboy, and BruceDropEmOff modeled pieces from the collection.

Reception to the show was mixed, while many praised Cenat's ambition and willingness to explore new ideas in the fashion industry. Further criticism was levied towards the price of some garments, with a $1,195 USD "Raglan Zip Up Jacket" being the subject of most discourse online.

In a piece for Rolling Stone, Jeff Ihaza compared skepticism towards Cenat as being reminiscent of reactions to Kanye West's first forays into fashion.

Cenat said that the 2026 collection was "about growth", "maturity", and "dedication".
