= Agent00 =

Canadian online streamer (born 1996)

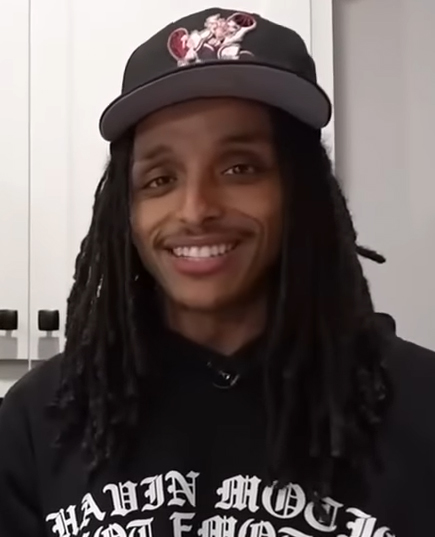
- Muktar in 2026
- Born: Din Muktar; April 23, 1996 (age 30); Toronto, Ontario, Canada
- Occupations: Live streamer; YouTuber
- Years active: 2016–present
- Known for: AMP
- Awards: Lifestyle

Twitch information
- Channel: Agent00
- Genres: Variety; Just Chatting
- Game: NBA 2K
- Followers: 3.5 million

YouTube information
- Channel: Agent_00
- Years active: 2022–present
- Subscribers: 1.41 million
- Views: 571 million
- Last updated: November 15, 2026

Din Muktar (born April 23, 1996), known online as Agent00 or Agent, is a Canadian Twitch streamer, YouTuber, and internet personality. He is a founding member of AMP, a content creator collective known for its collaborative videos and livestreams. Initially associated with the NBA 2K series, Muktar is also known for variety streaming and his admiration of former NBA player Andrea Bargnani.

His accolades include the Lifestyle award at the 2023 Streamy Awards, won by AMP, and Best Stream Duo at the 2025 Streamer Awards, which he won alongside ExtraEmily. In 2026, he participated in ComplexCon's "Streamer of the Year: LIVE" panel.

== Career ==
=== Early career and AMP ===
Muktar began creating online content by editing gaming montages for friends who competed in Call of Duty. He later focused on the NBA 2K series, uploading gameplay videos to YouTube and becoming part of its online creator community. His editing experience and collaborations with other creators helped him establish a full-time career on the platform.

In 2020, Muktar co-founded AMP alongside Duke Dennis, Fanum and ImDavisss. The collective later expanded to include Kai Cenat and Chrisnxtdoor. AMP became known for collaborative videos, livestreams, challenges and group events. Muktar initially proposed the group as a way for its members, who were based in different cities, to create content together.

=== Variety streaming and collaborative marathons ===
In 2024, Muktar participated in a lengthy Call of Duty: Black Ops II Zombies marathon with Cinna, followed by a Cuphead marathon with her. In August 2025, he and ExtraEmily undertook a cooperative Elden Ring marathon, streaming their attempts to complete the game together over several days. The event generated approximately six million hours watched across their streams. His Twitch audience grew substantially during 2024. In August of that year, he was among the platform's most-subscribed streamers, and coverage of his growth highlighted an interview with Twitch chief executive Dan Clancy.

Muktar in 2025

=== Fitness challenges and Streamer University ===
In January 2025, Agent began a weight-loss livestream challenge in which he intended to continue streaming until he had lost 20 pounds. Later that year, he announced an "Abs by November" challenge, a $100,000 bet with Kai Cenat. He documented his fitness progress through his streams and reveal in November 2025. Although he did not complete the challenge, his transformation impressed his viewer and inspired many to pursue their own fitness goals.

Muktar was also an instructor at Streamer University, a creator-focused educational event organized by Kai Cenat in May 2025. He taught sessions titled "Monetization for Dummies" and "Pocket Watching 101" and received the event's Professor of the Year title.

=== Survival series ===
In December 2025, Agent began a series of livestreamed survival challenges in remote and extreme environments. His first Arctic attempt ended after approximately ten hours, short of his goal of remaining there for 24 hours. He returned in January 2026 after preparing for the conditions and completed a 24-hour livestream in temperatures that fell to approximately −42 °C (−44 °F).

Muktar subsequently undertook survival challenges in the Amazon rainforest and the Australian Outback. He later returned to the Amazon with fellow streamers A2Guapo and Tvbanks for another extended survival broadcast. The series was nominated for Best Streamed Event at the 2026 Streamer Awards.

=== Automotive content and music ===
Muktar has released music under the Agent00 name. The song "Hit the Road" originated in an AMP LUV + MUSIC video built around the group's MP Lovin' Music concept. In September 2026, he released the Michelin Grip Care Package EP, containing five versions of "Hit the Road": trap, Jersey club, slowed-and-reverb, sped-up and house remixes.

Muktar's content has increasingly combined gaming with real-world activities, endurance challenges and collaborations, broadening his work beyond the basketball-game videos with which he began his career.

== Controversies ==
In May 2025, Muktar accused streamer Adin Ross of stealing his content, in which Ross responded with, “It’s impossible to be 100% creative.”

== Awards and nominations ==
| Cermony | Year | Award | Work | Result | Ref |
|---|---|---|---|---|---|
| Streamy Awards | 2023 | Lifestyle | —N/a | Won | |
| Streamy Awards | 2023 | Breakout Streamer | —N/a | Nominated | |
| The Streamer Awards | 2024 | Best Streamed Collab | Agent00 & Cinna | Nominated | |
| The Streamer Awards | 2024 | Best Variety Streamer | —N/a | Nominated | |
| The Streamer Awards | 2025 | Best Stream Duo (Best IRL Streamer) | Agent00 & ExtraEmily | Won | |
| The Streamer Awards | 2025 | Best Variety Streamer | —N/a | Nominated | |
| The Streamer Awards | 2026 | Best Streamed Series | Survival | Pending | |
| The Streamer Awards | 2026 | Best Variety Streamer | —N/a | Pending | |
