= 2xrakai =

American Internet personality (born 2008)

Rakai
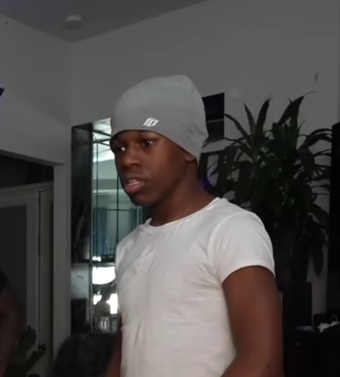
- Rakai in 2025
- Born: QuVonn RaKai Linder; 2008 (age 17–18)
- Occupations: Online streamer; rapper
- Years active: 2016–present

Twitch information
- Channel: 2xRaKai
- Followers: 2.5 million

YouTube information
- Channel: Rakai Live
- Years active: 2016-present
- Subscribers: 1.05 million

QuVonn RaKai Linder (born 2008), better known online as 2xRaKai or simply Rakai, is an American online streamer, YouTuber, and rapper. He is best known for his affiliation with the AMP content group and his frequent collaborations with Kai Cenat, particularly his appearances during Cenat's Mafiathon subathons and the Streamer University events.

== Career ==
Originally from Syracuse, New York, In November 2024, Rakai appeared during Kai Cenat's long-month subathon Mafiathon.

In 2025, Rakai appeared on streamer PlaqueBoyMax's series In The Booth, where he collaborated on the track Turn Up alongside PlaqueBoyMax and rapper BunnaB. The song was released on October 24, 2025, under 5STAR Records. During recording sessions, Rakai contributed improvised lyrics and a dance that became widely circulated online. Also in 2025, Rakai was nominated for "Best Breakout Streamer" at the Streamer Awards.

In December 2025, Rakai was banned from multiple platforms following allegations related to legal misconduct. During a livestream, he appeared in a vehicle while reportedly texting and driving, which was cited as a violation of Twitch community guidelines. Rakai received a 730-day ban from Twitch after, while streaming in a store, he handed a woman flowers that he did not pay for; Twitch flagged his actions as "illegal activities". His YouTube live chat was also disabled.

In November 2025, Rakai was involved in a public dispute with streamer QTCinderella. Following comments he made regarding her appearance, QTCinderella's partner, Ludwig Ahgren, publicly expressed discomfort, prompting Rakai to issue an apology. The friction intensified at the 2025 Streamer Awards when QTCinderella made a joke referencing Rakai's platform bans, leading him to criticize the event online. QTCinderella and Rakai later resolved the dispute during a collaborative stream hosted by JasonTheWeen in January 2026.

After participating as a student in the inaugural May 2025 Streamer University event, Rakai returned for the bootcamp's second installment in July 2026. As an alumni participant, he traveled to the Hendrix College campus to reunite with Cenat, stream campus room tours, and interact with the incoming 2026 class.

== Personal life ==
In 2026, Rakai started dating American social media personality Piper Rockelle during the Super Bowl weekend, which was confirmed by Rockelle in an interview with People.

== Discography ==
=== Singles ===
- "Turn Up" with PlaqueBoyMax and BunnaB (2025)
- "AMP DissTrack" with BabyChiefDoit (2025)

== Awards and nominations ==
Award	Year	Category	Result	Ref.
The Streamer Awards	2025	Best Breakout Streamer	Nominated	
The Streamer Awards	2026	Best Reality Streamer	Pending	
