= Kaysan =

Iranian-American streamer (born 1994)

- Born: Kaysan Ghasseminejad; December 19, 1994 (age 31); Los Angeles, California, U.S.
- Other name: FaZe Kaysan
- Occupations: Live streamer; DJ
- Years active: 2022–present
- Known for: FaZe Clan, CORE

Kick information
- Channel: Kaysan
- Genre: roleplaying
- Game: GTA V
- Followers: 31.7K

Twitch information
- Channel: Kaysan
- Genre: roleplaying
- Game: GTA V
- Followers: 614K

X information
- Handle: @Kaysan
- Followers: 139.8K

YouTube information
- Channel: Kaysan Live
- Subscribers: 67K

Kaysan Ghasseminejad (born December 19, 1994), known mononymously as Kaysan, is an Iranian-American streamer, gamer, DJ and partial owner of FaZe Esports.

== Early life ==
Kaysan Ghasseminejad was born in Los Angeles on December 19, 1994, to Iranian immigrants.

== Career ==
Ghasseminejad joined FaZe Clan on September 27, 2021 as a content creator and DJ. A day after joining Faze Clan, Ghasseminejad released his debut single "Made a Way" featuring rappers Future and Lil Durk.

In 2023, Ghasseminejad became an owner of both Atlanta FaZe (now known as FaZe Vegas) and FaZe Esports. Ghasseminejad was an active member of Faze during the 2024 FaZe Clan Rebrand/Revival and would even participate in the October 2025 Twitch FaZe Subathon. On December 26, 2025, Ghasseminejad would announce his departure from FaZe Clan following the departure of the other members of the FaZe Subathon but would continue to be an owner and manager for FaZe Esports.

In 2026, the other FaZe Subathon members made a new content group named CORE. While Ghasseminejad did not directly join the group he is closely related and will often appear in CORE YouTube videos and live streams.

== Awards and nominations ==
Ceremony	Year	Category	Result	Ref.
The Streamer Awards	2025	Best Music Streamer	Nominated	
The Streamer Awards	2025	Best Roleplay Streamer	Nominated	
The Streamer Awards	2026	Best Roleplay Streamer	Nominated	

== Regular streams ==
Ghasseminejad mostly streamed GTA V RP on Twitch or Kick. Most of his streams are later uploaded on his Kaysan Live YouTube channel.

When FaZe Esports is playing a competitive game, he sometimes hosts a live watch party of that game to support the team.

== Kaysan's Showdown ==
Ghasseminejad is also known for organizing and hosting Kaysan's Showdown, a minor esports event with a cash prize pool for games such as Call of Duty, Counter-Strike 2 and Halo Infinite.

These events have been sponsored by brands such as Xfinity and Betya before.

== Politics ==
Ghasseminejad supported the 2026 United States air strikes and the killing of the previous Supreme Leader of Iran, Ali Khamenei. He stated on X, "Free Iran. Fuck that tyrant regime. This is about FREEDOM." He later stated on a stream, "This man would murder women for not covering their face."
