= Druski =

American comedian, actor, and influencer (born 1994)

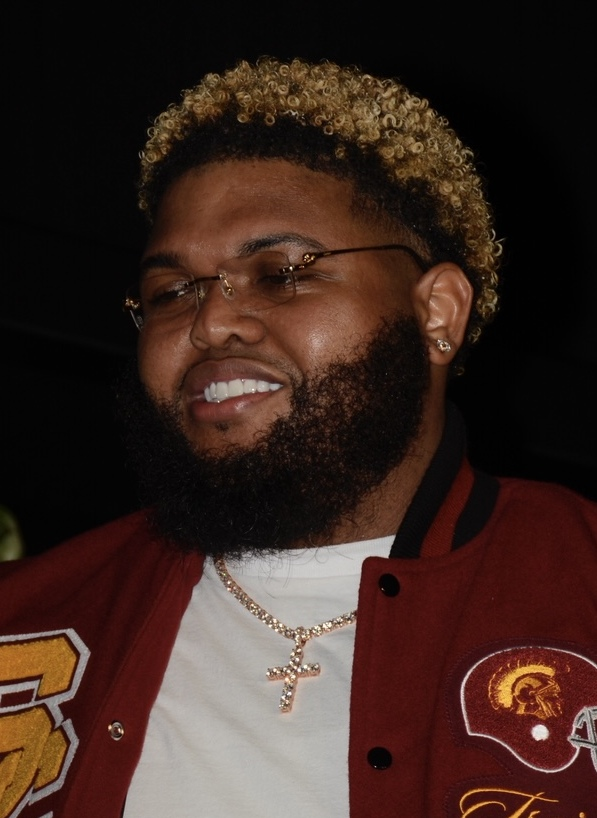
- Desbordes at the Essence Festival of Culture in 2025
- Born: Drew Desbordes; September 12, 1994 (age 32); Columbia, Maryland, U.S.
- Education: Georgia Gwinnett College; Georgia Southern University

Comedy career
- Years active: 2017–present
- Genres: Satire; improv; dark humor; sketch; character comedy; racial humor; heritage comedy

Instagram information
- Page: druski
- Followers: 13.7 million

Twitch information
- Channel: druski
- Followers: 284,000

YouTube information
- Channel: druski
- Subscribers: 6.11 million
- Views: 1.3 billion
- Last updated: March 28, 2026
- Website: 4lifers.com

Drew Desbordes (born September 12, 1994), known professionally as Druski, is an American comedian, actor, and influencer. He is known for his sketch comedy, Coulda Been Records, and collaborations with various musicians in their music videos, including Drake, Lil Yachty, Jack Harlow, and others.

== Early life and education ==
Drew Desbordes was born on September 12, 1994, in Columbia, Maryland, to Cheryl Desbordes, a worker at various state departments in Georgia, and David McLain Desbordes, a commercial pilot who previously served in the United States Air Force as a captain and in the National Guard as a major.

Desbordes' interest in comedy began after entertaining family members. His family introduced him to the genre as a child, as his parents watched popular comedians on television, such as Cedric the Entertainer and Dave Chappelle.

Desbordes graduated from South Gwinnett High School. He then attended Georgia Gwinnett College before transferring to Georgia Southern University. In interviews, Druski discusses experiencing depression while in college, leading him to stop attending classes, and instead watching YouTube videos. He cites Steve Harvey and Gary Vaynerchuk as influences during this time. He dropped out of college after two semesters. Originally a sports analytics major hoping to become a sportscaster, he later turned to comedy after encouragement from his classmates.

== Career ==
On October 2, 2017, Desbordes began posting comedic skits and content on his Instagram account under the handle "druski2funny", now Druski. In his early skits, he played a character named Kyle Rogger, a frat bro, a ruthless record label executive, and others.

On March 9, 2020, Desbordes made an appearance in the music video of Lil Yachty's song "Oprah's Bank Account". On August 13, 2020, he was featured in the music video of Drake's song "Laugh Now Cry Later" featuring Lil Durk. He would later connect with rapper Jack Harlow, opening and hosting shows for him. On October 22, 2020, he made a cameo as a school bus driver in the music video for Jack Harlow's song "Tyler Herro". He also appears in videos for Jack Harlow's song "Churchill Downs", featuring Drake, and Chlöe and Latto's music video for "For the Night".

In 2021, Druski created "Coulda Been Records" as an avenue for artists to join his Instagram Lives, usually resulting in him teasing them throughout their appearances. Miami Dolphins wide receiver Odell Beckham Jr. struck up a friendship with Druski upon finding his videos, and invited the comedian to stay at his home during the COVID-19 pandemic. Druski was an opening act for J. Cole and 21 Savage's The Off-Season Tour throughout September and October 2021. Also in October, Desbordes satirically offered Meek Mill to sign onto Coulda Been Records after Meek Mill said that he did not get paid for his music. Desbordes opened for Chris Brown and Lil Baby on the One of Them Ones tour in the summer of 2022. He headlined his first comedy tour, "Coulda Woulda Shoulda", in March 2023. The tour featured a mixture of traditional stand-up comedy and live auditions as part of his Coulda Been Records series.

In fall 2024, Druski launched Coulda Fest with a sold-out show at the State Farm Arena in Atlanta. The concept was later expanded into a 10-city arena tour in 2025, with all dates reportedly sold out. The tour featured musical performances by Snoop Dogg, Wiz Khalifa, A Boogie wit da Hoodie, Lil Yachty, Jack Harlow, Chief Keef, G Herbo, BigXthaPlug, Soulja Boy, Young M.A, Shaboozey, Rod Wave & more.

In 2025, Forbes magazine ranked Druski #9 on its top creators list, after the comedian earned $14 million that year. On February 5, 2026, Druski caused controversy at the 15th NFL Honors while announcing the recipient of the 2025 AP NFL Offensive Player of the Year award. While presenting the award alongside Barry Sanders, Druski mispronounced the last name of the winner, Jaxon Smith-Njigba of Seattle Seahawks, saying "The winner decided not to pull up tonight. So, I guess on his behalf, uh, Jaxon Smith-N-nuh-nuh-jigba, Ni-Nigga-buh. Nigga-buh. Nuh-jee? Nuh-jee-buh, JSN!"

In March 2026, Druski released a viral video where he seemingly appeared as Erika Kirk, the CEO of Turning Point USA. The video received more than 100 million views within two days of its release, while also causing controversy. Despite images of online responses by Kirk, she has not officially responded. In June 2026, it was announced Druski would join the cast of The Catch, a baseball romantic comedy starring Emma Stone and Chris Pine. In 2026, Druski hosted the 26th BET Awards. In September 2026, on an episode of The Diary of a CEO, Desbordes credited Drake's decision to cast him in the "Laugh Now Cry Later" video with launching his career, according to Billboard.

== Business ventures ==
Desbordes launched his 4lifers entertainment company in 2023, which serves as the umbrella company for his business ventures, including live touring, TV, film, and web productions, merchandise, licensing, and Coulda Been Records.

=== Endorsements ===
Desbordes has appeared in numerous promotions. In April 2021, he appeared in the Squad Up The World | Call of Duty: Warzone Season 3 trailer, alongside Young Thug, Saweetie, Jack Harlow, Swae Lee and more. Druski then appeared in Beats By Dre 'It's the Music' TV commercial in April 2021. In the fall of 2021, Druski starred in Bud Light seltzer's national TV campaign. Desbordes also appeared in the Google Pixel Anthem spot, alongside stars Giannis Antetokounmpo, Candace Parker, Joel Embiid, Kelsey Plum, Jayson Tatum, Jalen Green, Taylor Rooks, Richard Jefferson and Simu Liu.

In 2025, Druski starred in a campaign for T-Mobile as the company's "Chief Switching Operator," appearing in television commercials alongside Zoe Saldaña and Jeff Bridges.

Druski has also done commercial work for brands including 2K Sports, Amazon, American Express, Fanatics, Inc., EA Sports, Meta, PrizePicks, QuikTrip, Raising Cane's Chicken Fingers, and Spotify. Druski has equity stake in Happy Dad Hard Seltzer, which he actively promotes across his content and live shows.

=== Coulda Been Records ===
Desbordes launched Coulda Been Records in 2019, a satirical improv series about a record label crafted for his Instagram Live talent-scouting show. Desbordes began the show in 2019 as a talent show where he sought out singers, dancers, and rappers, however, Desbordes remarked, it "turned out to be shit". In a pivot, he renamed the project "Coulda Been", and has subsequently turned the project into a record label. In creating the label, Druski has noted that he studied two inspirational figures, Suge Knight and Sean Combs. Coulda Been Records features Desbordes taking on a record label executive persona. Established artists and friends like Chloe Bailey, Drake, Jack Harlow, Ella Mai, Kodak Black, Chance the Rapper, Justin Bieber, Antonio Brown, 21 Savage, and Ice Spice frequently join Druski's talent show streams. Coulda Been Records Season 1 is an 8–10 episode series in which contestants compete to win a Coulda Been Records album deal.

=== Coulda Been Love ===
In February 2025, Druski premiered Coulda Been Love, a satirical reality dating series, which airs on his YouTube channel. The show is a parody of the dating game show format, with Druski as the bachelor seeking love from a diverse group of contestants. The series is known for its comedic approach, exaggerated scenarios, and unique characters. The first season concluded in March 2025 with over 100 million views, and was followed by a reunion episode.

=== Coulda Been Daddy ===
Druski released Coulda Been Daddy, a satirical documentary about parenting, in June 2026.

== Film and television ==
Desbordes made his film debut in 2023 with a cameo in House Party. He played a supporting character in Praise This (2023), directed by Tina Gordon Chism. In 2025, Desbordes presented the award for Best Team at the 2025 ESPY Awards. In 2026, he served as a commentator throughout season 29 of The Voice.

Desbordes hosted Saturday Night Live on November 7, 2026, becoming the first digital content creator to host the show.

List of film appearances
| Year | Title | Role(s) | Notes |
|---|---|---|---|
| 2023 | House Party | Druski | (as Drew Desbordes) |
| 2023 | Praise This | Aaron | |
| 2026 | Livestream from Hell | Druski | Also producer |
| 2027 | The Catch | Security Guard | |

List of television appearances
| Year | Title | Role(s) | Notes |
|---|---|---|---|
| 2023–2024 | Grown-ish | Brock | 3 episodes |
| 2026 | The Voice | Himself | |
| 2026 | Saturday Night Live | Himself | Episode: "Druski/The Strokes" |
| 2026 | Collect & Praise | Pastor Dru | Main role; also producer |

== Videography ==
List of music video appearances
| Year | Artist | Title | Role |
|---|---|---|---|
| 2020 | Lil Yachty and DaBaby featuring Drake | "Oprah's Bank Account" | Himself |
| 2020 | Drake featuring Lil Durk | "Laugh Now Cry Later" | |
| 2020 | Jack Harlow | "Tyler Herro" | Bus Driver |
| 2022 | Jack Harlow featuring Drake | "Churchill Downs" | Himself |
| 2022 | Chlöe and Latto | "For the Night" | |
| 2024 | Rod Wave | “Passport Junkie” | Himself |
| 2025 | Fuerza Regida | "GodFather" | |

== Awards and nominations ==
| Year | Ceremony | Category | Work | Result | Ref. |
|---|---|---|---|---|---|
| 2024 | The Streamer Awards | Best Streamed Collab | Sleepover Stream with Kai Cenat & Kevin Hart | Won | |
| 2026 | The Webby Awards | Webby Special Achievement | Webby Special Achievement | Won | |

== Tours ==
- Coulda Woulda Shoulda (2023)
