= Fanum (streamer) =

American Twitch streamer (born 1997)

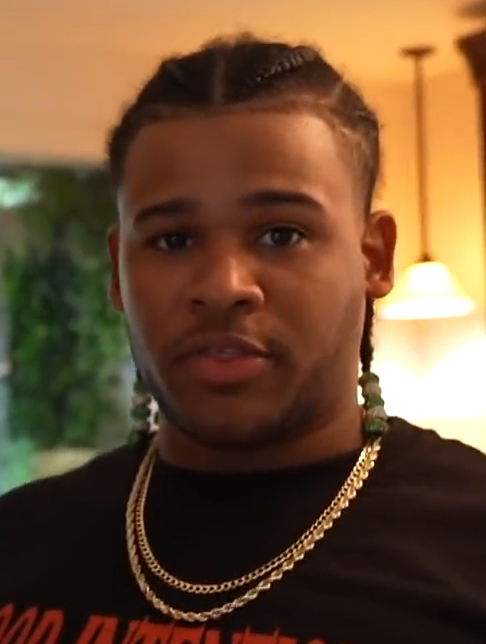
- Fanum in 2021
- Born: Roberto Escanio; August 22, 1997 (age 29); The Bronx, New York City, U.S.
- Education: Bronx Early College Academy; New York City College of Technology (dropped out)
- Occupations: Twitch streamer; YouTuber

Twitch information
- Channel: Fanum
- Years active: 2016–present
- Genres: Gaming; Just Chatting
- Game: GTA Online
- Followers: 4 million

YouTube information
- Channel: Fanum Live
- Years active: 2013–present
- Genre: Comedy
- Subscribers: 3.97 million
- Views: 3.6 billion
- Last updated: November 15, 2026
- Website: Fanum Supply

Roberto Escanio (born August 22, 1997), known online as Fanum, is an American streamer and content creator. Fanum emerged online around 2016. He is known for originating the term "Fanum tax". He won "Breakout Streamer of the Year" at the 13th Streamy Awards and the "Best Roleplay Streamer" of the year award at the 2022 Streamer Awards and 2023 Streamer Awards. He is a member of the streamer group Any Means Possible (AMP).

== Early life ==
Roberto Escanio was born on August 22, 1997, in The Bronx, New York City, to parents from the Dominican Republic. He has a younger brother who has appeared in his videos. He speaks English and Spanish. He grew up in Concourse, Bronx.

After graduating from Bronx Early College Academy, Fanum enrolled at the New York City College of Technology but left to focus on earning money for his YouTube equipment.

== Career ==
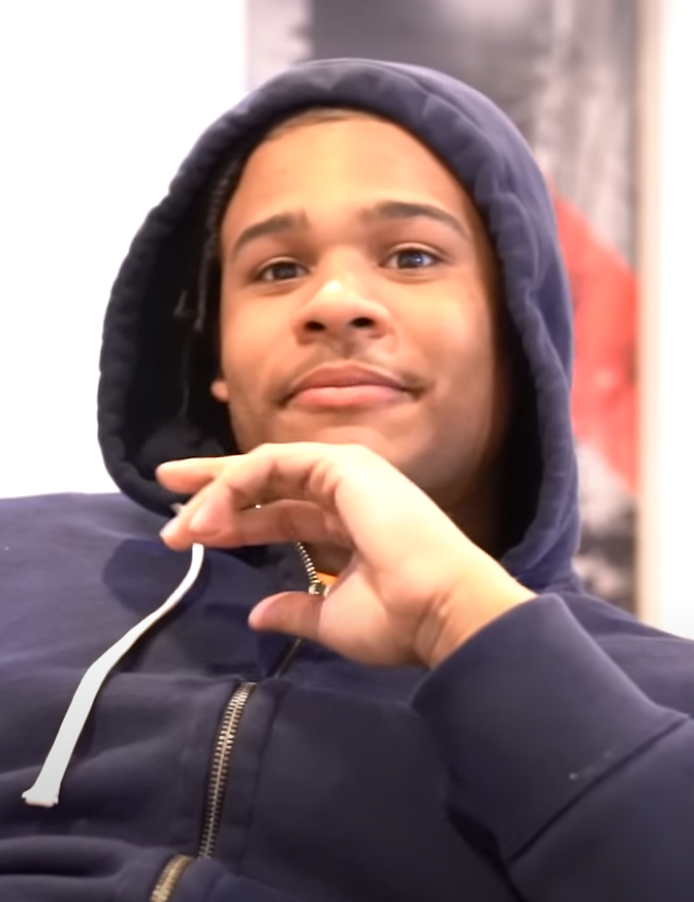
Fanum in 2019

Fanum began streaming on Twitch in November 2016 and made his YouTube channel, JustFanum, in May 2017. He posted his first video in February 2019. He streamed NBA 2K and later expanded to IRL vlogs, which often drew upon his experiences in New York.

In March 2023, he won "Best Roleplay Streamer" at the 2022 Streamer Awards. On August 27, 2023, Fanum won "Breakout Streamer of the Year" at the 13th Streamy Awards. Fanum has been featured on the music video for Offset's September 2023 single "Fan" alongside Kai Cenat.

In February 2024, he won "Best Roleplay Streamer" at the 2023 Streamer Awards. On June 2, 2024, he played in a soccer charity match hosted by British YouTube group Beta Squad and American YouTube group AMP at Selhurst Park, London, England, where he played for team AMP. The event raised money for The Water Project. Later that month, he appeared as a contestant in the Sidemen reality competition series Inside. The series features 10 guests who compete in challenges to secure a prize fund totalled at £1 million, with everything they buy or do costing money from the prize fund. He was in the show for seven days and finished in 4th place. Later in December 2024, he was nominated for "Best Roleplay Streamer" at the 2024 Streamer Awards.

On February 14, 2025, Fanum participated in "Match for Hope 2025", a soccer charity event hosted in Doha, Qatar, as a player for team AboFlah & KSI, facing off against team Chunkz & IShowSpeed. The match ended with team AboFlah & KSI's 6–5 victory over team Chunkz & IShowSpeed. The event managed to raise more than $10.7 million for charity.

On March 8, 2025, Fanum participated in the 2025 Sidemen Charity Match, held at Wembley Stadium in London, United Kingdom, playing for the YouTube Allstars team.

=== AMP Group ===
Fanum is an original and prominent member of the American content collective known as Any Means Possible (AMP). He contributes to the group's collaborative challenge videos. Fanum invited popular streamer Kai Cenat to the AMP group. In August 2023, Kai Cenat was arrested following a meet-and-greet in Union Square Park he hosted with Fanum that resulted in at least 2,000 people crowding the park. The event resulted in property destruction and several injuries. While no charges were placed against Fanum, Cenat was charged with inciting a riot.

== Fanum tax ==
Fanum tax is Internet slang for taking or sharing someone's food. The first usage of Fanum tax referred exclusively to Fanum, who jokingly "taxed" snacks by taking bites of food from fellow content creators during live streams. The term circulated among the YouTube collective AMP in late 2022 and was popularized especially during Fanum's Twitch streams with popular American YouTuber Kai Cenat, when Fanum took Cenat's cookies. In an interview with Wired, Fanum defined the term:

Let's say your friend having a meal, he's having a good meal, and you just want a piece of that meal. Like, you know what I'm saying? You need a share. That's your friend and the friend's share, right? Get you a little piece of the meal. It's the Fanum tax. You just go ahead and just like, lemme get a little bit of 5%, 10% of the meal, maybe 20%.

On October 2, 2023, a TikTok account under the username @ovp.9 posted a short video of a character from the online video game Fortnite "singing" to a musical parody of the 2021 song "Ecstasy" by Suicidal Idol. The parody, titled either "Sticking Out Your Gyat for the Rizzler" or "You're so skibidi, you're so fanum tax", features multiple internet culture terms, including gyatt, Skibidi Toilet, rizz, and Sigma male. The song was used in many TikTok videos, inspiring a mass creation of videos featuring Minecraft-inspired games on the platform. The sound was used in over 195,000 videos and amassed over 321 million views on TikTok. The New York Times referred to the term as "the language of Gen Alpha."

== Filmography ==
| Year | Title | Role | Notes | Ref. |
|---|---|---|---|---|
| 2024 | Inside | Contestant | Series 1 | |
| 2025 | Inside: USA | Host | | |

== Awards and nominations ==
| Ceremony | Year | Category | Result | Ref. |
|---|---|---|---|---|
| The Streamer Awards | 2022 | Best Roleplay Streamer | Won | |
| The Streamer Awards | 2023 | Best Roleplay Streamer | Won | |
| The Streamer Awards | 2024 | Best Roleplay Streamer | Nominated | |
| The Streamer Awards | 2025 | Best Roleplay Streamer | Won | |
| Streamy Awards | 2023 | Breakout Streamer | Won | |
