= AMP (streamer collective) =

American streamer collective

- Any Means Possible
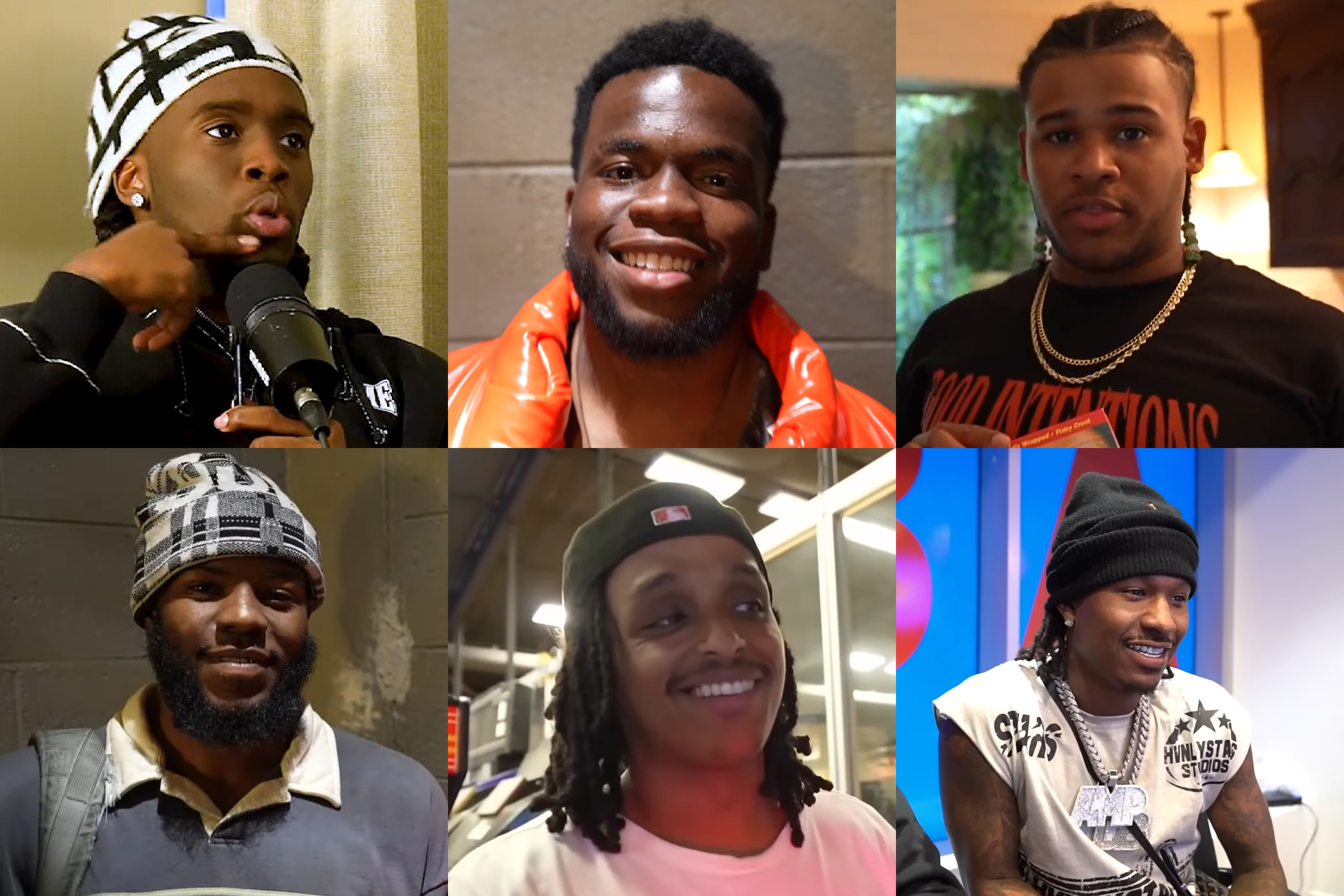
- Clockwise from top left: Kai Cenat, ImDavisss, Fanum, Duke Dennis, Agent00, Chrisnxtdoor
- Formation: 2019; 7 years ago
- Purpose: Twitch streaming; Making YouTube videos; Content creation
- Location: Atlanta, Georgia, U.S.
- Origins: New York City
- Key people: Denzel Shaquille Dennis (Duke Dennis); Din Muktar (Agent00); Roberto Bryan Escanio Pena (JustFanum); Christopher Emekachukwu Dimbo (Chrisnxtdoor); Davis Jeremiah Dodds (ImDavisss); Kai Carlo Cenat III (Kai Cenat); Rayasianboy (Chen-Ruei Hsu; affiliated member); RaKai / 2xRakai (QuVonn RaKai Linder; affiliated member); Tota / Tota Mc (Jonathan Augusto; affiliated member)
- Website: https://amp.shop/

AMP (Any Means Possible) is a Twitch and YouTube collective consisting of Twitch streamers, influencers and internet personalities Duke Dennis, Agent00, Fanum, Chrisnxtdoor, ImDavisss, and Kai Cenat. The group streams various games on each members' Twitch accounts, as well as making various challenge, gaming and vlog videos on their YouTube channels.

Beyond their Twitch and YouTube content, AMP have expanded into various business ventures, including their partnership with Bang Energy in June 2024 and the launch of their skincare brand TONE in February 2025.

== Members ==
The group has the following members:

- Denzel Shaquille Dennis – known online as Duke Dennis (2019–present)
- Din Muktar – known online as Agent00 (2019–present)
- Roberto Bryan Escanio Pena – known online as Fanum (2019–present)
- Christopher Emekachukwu Dimbo – known online as Chrisnxtdoor (2019–present)
- Davis Jeremiah Dodds – known online as ImDavisss (2019–present)
- Kai Carlo Cenat III – known online as Kai Cenat (2020–present)

=== Affiliations ===
- Chen-Ruei "Ray" Hsu – known online as Rayasianboy (affiliated since 2023)
- QuVonn RaKai Linder – known online as 2xrakai or Rakai (affiliated since 2024)
- Tylil James – known online as TheTylilShow or Tylil (affiliated 2022)
- Akil Edwards – known online as Punga or PG (affiliated since 2022)
- Jonathan Augusto – known online as Tota Mc or Tota (affiliated since 2025)

=== Former affiliations ===
- Reginald Travers – known online as ReGGie or Girlhefunny1 (affiliated to 2024 – 2026)
- Desmond McCollough – known online as BTB Dezz or Dezz (affiliated to 2023 – 2026)

== History ==
=== 2019–2022: Origins and initial popularity ===
Fanum met half of the group's members while gaming online and met the other members while doing IRL content.

The group's fifth member, Chrisnxtdoor originally joined the group as an editor. When Fanum had to go to Virginia, he and Davis, who was friends with Chris, went to Chris' home where he was living at the time. When Fanum entered Chris' room, he was editing a video, which he showed to him. Fanum was impressed with the video and knew he had found the group's editor.

The last member to join the group was Kai Cenat. Cenat joined the group after being discovered for his content in mid-2020. According to Fanum, Kai solidified his spot in the group while they were filming an outfit competition video at Walmart, specifically for its ending. The group felt the videos ending was missing "that punch", so according to Fanum they "...thought about someone jumping in a little fountain, but nobody wanted to do it". As Fanum was arguing with the groups other members, Kai walked right into it. "I [Fanum] was just smiling and clapping. He didn't give any fucks, and that's what solidified Kai’s spot in AMP."

In 2022, the group purchased a 5-bedroom home in Atlanta, Georgia for $2.7 million. Much of each members' streaming content is produced there.

=== 2023–present: Expanded content and continued growth ===
The group has continued to grow in popularity, with several of its members becoming especially popular online; most notably Kai Cenat. Cenat is the most-followed Twitch streamer and holds the record for the most-subscribed Twitch account of all time, a record he first held starting in February 2023. His record was briefly broken by the streamer Ironmouse in September 2024, with Cenat reclaiming the title just a month later during a month-long Mafiathon(Subathon).

In August 2024, the group was unexpectedly evicted from a $30 million penthouse in the Manhattan neighborhood of Tribeca in New York City, just 4 days after moving in. The exact reason for the eviction remains unclear. During a livestream by Kai Cenat following the eviction, fans speculated that noise may have played a role. In response to this, Cenat said during a stream, "We're in a two-story $30M penthouse, where's the complaints coming from?" For a few days following the eviction, they were "homeless", until Bang Energy helped them secure a different penthouse also in Manhattan. During that time, Kai Cenat streamed out of a U-Haul and was visited by the rapper Ice Spice.

In January 2025, AMP members Kai Cenat, Fanum, and Agent 00 garnered controversy online over their treatment of a $70K USD AI robot during one of Cenat's livestreams. During the stream, they were seen repeatedly knocking the robot down as it struggled to stand back up. A clip from the stream of their actions also went viral online. Fans and critics expressed disgust for their actions online, with some feeling it showed a deeper reflection of power dynamics and a lack of empathy.

In July 2025, the group went live for 12 hours each day that month, during a marathon streaming event known as AMP Summer. During the 30-day event they stayed at the San Antonio home of former NBA Spurs player Tony Parker. Ahead of the event, they released a trailer announcing it, featuring the rapper T-Pain.

== Other ventures ==
Since 2020, the group has sold AMP clothing merchandise through an online store.

In June 2024, AMP partnered with Bang Energy, with each of the group's members serving as ambassadors for the brand.

The logo for TONE

In February 2025, the group launched their own skincare brand known as TONE, in partnership with the talent agency Night. In July 2025, the brand's products began being sold in Target stores nationwide across the United States.

The brand's first ambassador is the NFL player Travis Hunter.

== Awards and nominations ==
Year	Award	Category	Result	Ref.
2023	13th Streamy Awards	Show of the Year	Nominated	
2023	13th Streamy Awards	Lifestyle	Won	
2023	2023 Streamer Awards	Best Content Organization	Won	
2024	2024 Streamer Awards	Best Content Organization	Nominated	
2025	2025 Streamer Awards	Best Content Organization	Nominated	
2026	2026 Streamer Awards	Best Content Group	Nominated	
