= Rizz =

Internet slang word for charisma

Rizz (/ˈrɪz/) is internet slang meaning style, charm, or attractiveness. It is likely short for charisma.

== Background ==
The phrase was popularized by American YouTuber and Twitch streamer Kai Cenat in mid-2021, and earlier used among his friend group. It subsequently went viral on the social media application TikTok. Oxford University Press named rizz its word of the year for 2023.

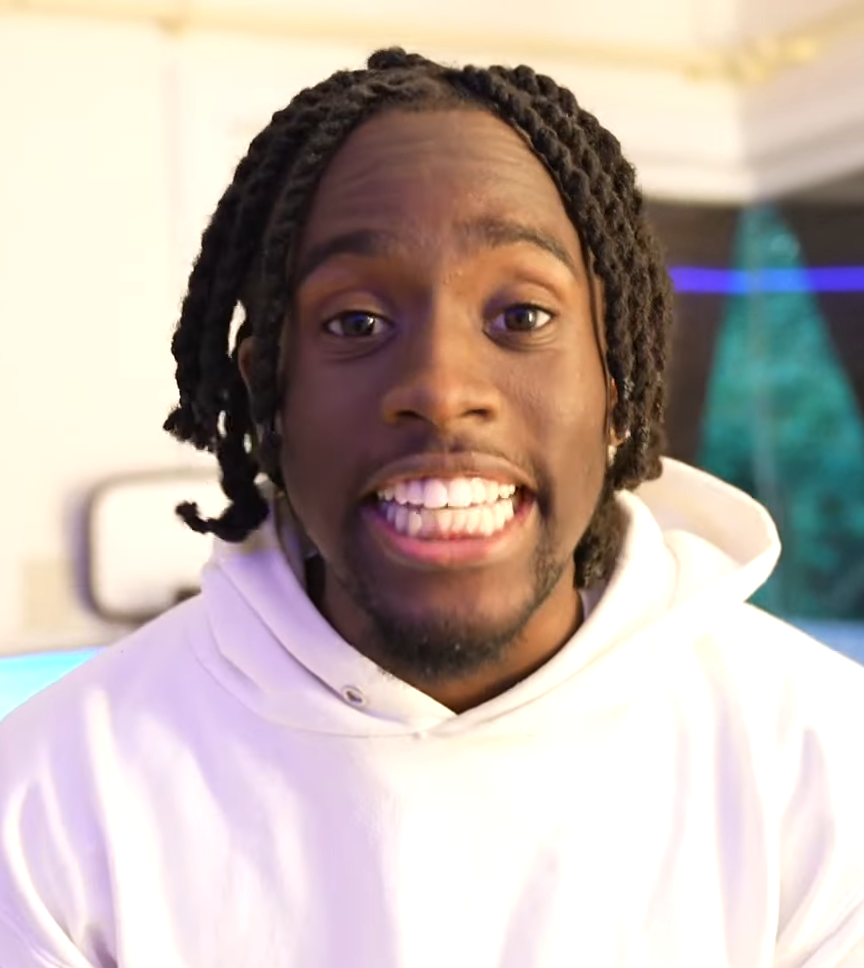
Kai Cenat, who greatly popularized the word rizz

Rizz is a colloquial noun, used when describing possession of charisma. As a verb, rizz can be used to describe using charisma to attract someone, as to "rizz up" a person. It may be a clipped form of charisma, though this is not certain, similar to fridge < refrigerator and flu < influenza.

== Popularity ==
The word is mainly used by Generation Z, though it has attracted significant use from Generation Alpha as well. Further development of the word "rizz" includes "Rizzler" or "Rizz God", meaning highly charismatic, and "Unspoken Rizz", meaning a person's ability to attract a person without speaking.

Cenat stated in an interview on the No Jumper podcast that after the word went viral on TikTok he stopped using it himself, stating that the viral use on TikTok "butchered" the word. The term went further viral in June 2023, after actor Tom Holland explained in an interview with BuzzFeed that he possessed "limited rizz" and it was by playing the "long game" that helped to win over his then girlfriend (now wife), actress Zendaya. From this, a number of memes were created. Rizz was named the Oxford English Dictionary Word of the Year for 2023.

== See also ==
- Glossary of Generation Z slang
- Gyatt – another slang term popularized by Cenat
- The Rizzler – a social media personality known for his "rizz face"
- Skibidi Toilet
