= Gyatt =

Internet slang word

Gyatt (/ɡjɑːt/) is a term from African-American Vernacular English originally used in exclamation, such as "gyatt damn". In the 2020s, the word experienced a semantic shift and gained the additional meaning of "a person, usually a woman, with large and attractive buttocks and sometimes an hourglass figure".

With slightly varying definitions, gyatt garnered virality on the social media platform TikTok in 2022 in part due to its frequent use by various online streamers. It has become an internet meme, particularly employed and popularized by Generation Alpha.

== Etymology ==
According to American linguist John McWhorter, the term "evolved from 'goddamn'." Kelly Elizabeth Wright, a research fellow in language sciences at Virginia Tech, claims that the provenance of gyatt is thought to be Black Southern, Jamaican, among other communities of the African diaspora. The term is attributed to having roots of African-American Vernacular English.

=== 2022 semantic shift ===
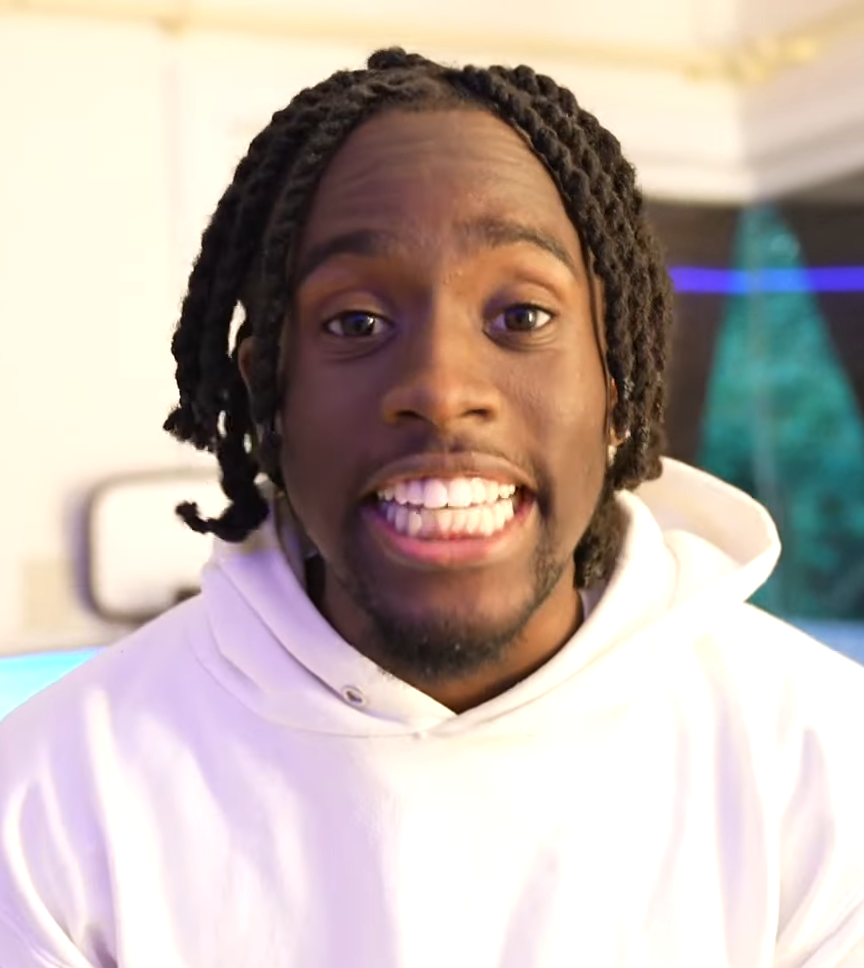
Popular streamer Kai Cenat, who popularized the word gyatt

The current meaning of the term gyatt was coined by online streamer YourRAGE, who used it to describe a physically attractive woman, and it was popularized by Kai Cenat, an American Twitch streamer.

Everybody used to say "god damn" or "golly" but I said it weird. I'd always say "gyatt", I would never say "god damn". Chat realized that, and a way of making fun of me in 2020, they started typing "gyatt" to mock me.

— YourRAGE, "THE ONLY DEFINITION OF #GYATT 😒 #gyat #gyatttttttt" (2023)

On October 2, 2023, a TikTok account under the username @ovp.9 posted a short video of a character from the online video game Fortnite "singing" to a musical parody of the 2021 song "ecstacy" by Suicidal-Idol. The parody featured multiple internet culture terms, including Skibidi Toilet and rizz. According to The New York Times, the parody is cited as "a key" to the popularization of gyatt.

Backronyms have been created for the term like "Girl Your Ass [is] Thick", "Girl You Ate That", "Get Your Act Together", among others.

== Usage ==
According to Legit.ng, the term is commonly used by "guys when they see a girl, usually with a curvy body type," and can also be used to indicate enthusiasm or excitement.

Gyatt is characterized in the media as a term used both by Generation Alpha and Generation Z. However, some members of Generation Z have stated that they do not attribute the term to their cohort. According to The Today Show, the term is used verbally and on messaging platforms such as Discord, TikTok, Twitch, Instagram, and YouTube.

== Reception and impact ==
Alongside its attribution with Generation Alpha, gyatt has been of interest to digital marketers in consideration of the cohort's emerging consumer consumption. The term was nominated for the American Dialect Society's 2023 Word of The Year.

== See also ==
- Glossary of Generation Z slang
- African-American Vernacular English
