= Rayasianboy =

Taiwanese online streamer and YouTuber (born 2005)

- Hsu in 2025
- Born: Chen-Ruei Hsu; October 31, 2005 (age 21); Taiwan
- Occupations: Online streamer; YouTuber

Instagram information
- Page: Ray
- Followers: 3 million

Twitch information
- Channel: rayasianboy
- Years active: 2024–present
- Followers: 3.2 million

YouTube information
- Channel: RAY LIVE
- Years active: 2024–present
- Subscribers: 1.72 million
- Views: 689 million

Chinese name
- Traditional Chinese: 許宸睿
- Simplified Chinese: 许宸睿
Transcriptions
- Last updated: August 18, 2026

Chen-Ruei "Ray" Hsu (born October 31, 2005), known online as Rayasianboy, is a Taiwanese online streamer and YouTuber. Ray gained recognition after meeting American streamer Kai Cenat during a livestream in Japan in 2023. He later appeared in livestreams and videos with Kai and members of AMP, and joined the Clover Boys. He won Best Reality Streamer at the 2025 Streamer Awards.

== Early life ==
Ray was born in Taiwan and attended Tamkang High School. According to a 2025 profile in GQ Taiwan, he played soccer as a child before becoming interested in basketball. He subsequently played point guard and shooting guard on his school basketball team.

== Career ==
=== 2023–2024: Breakthrough ===
During a school exchange trip to Japan in July 2023, Ray learned that Kai was broadcasting nearby and followed clues from the livestream to a 7-Eleven, where he approached him. Their encounter was captured on the stream and circulated online.

Kai later visited Taiwan for Ray's high-school graduation in 2024 and invited him to the United States. Ray subsequently created content with Kai and other members of AMP.

At the 2024 Streamer Awards, Ray was nominated for Best Breakout Streamer.

=== 2025–present ===
In March 2025, Ray appeared in the GQ Sports video series 10 Essentials. The Central News Agency reported that the video reached number five on YouTube's United States trending list within seven hours of publication.

In June 2025, Ray played in a creator charity basketball game in Houston. He made four three-point shots during the game, including one from near midcourt.

In October 2025, GQ Taiwan published what it described as Ray's first exclusive magazine interview. In the interview, Ray said that his time with Kai and other AMP members had shown him how successful creators handled their careers and had helped him remain grounded.

In December 2025, Ray won Best Reality Streamer at the 2025 Streamer Awards.

In July 2026, Ray conducted a three-day series of streams in Taiwan with two U.S.-based creator friends and launched a Chinese-language YouTube channel. The following month, Complex ranked him 14th on its list of the 25 best current streamers.

== Brand partnerships and business ventures ==
=== BAPE ===
In April 2025, Ray and Kai modeled in the campaign for the BAPE by KidSuper collection, a collaboration between BAPE and KidSuper.

=== Adidas and RUEI ===
Ray announced a partnership with Adidas in October 2025.

In February 2026, Adidas named Ray as one of four creators responsible for drafting teams for The Showdown, an invitational held during the company's NBA All-Star Weekend program.

GQ Taiwan reported in October 2025 that Ray had created the clothing label RUEI, whose name was derived from his Chinese name.

At Fanatics Fest in July 2026, Adidas presented Ray with a pink Harden Vol. 10 sneaker bearing RUEI branding. An initial release of 50 pairs took place at the event. Sneaker News subsequently reported that a wider release was planned for fall 2026.

== Awards and nominations ==
Year	Organization	Award	Result	Ref.
2024	The Streamer Awards	Best Breakout Streamer	Nominated	
2025	The Streamer Awards	Best Reality Streamer	Won	
