= Subathon =

Type of fundraising event on livestreaming platforms

A subathon (sometimes typeset as sub-a-thon by some outlets) is a type of marathon fundraising event typically held on video game livestreaming platforms.

== Etymology ==
"Subathon" is a portmanteau of "subscription" and "marathon". The term was popularized by several other Twitch streamers such as Ludwig, Kai Cenat, and Ironmouse.

== Background ==
A monetization feature on the video game livestreaming service Twitch is the ability for users to purchase subscriptions ("subs") to channels, which allow the user to view streams on that channel without advertising. Subscribers also receive badges that can be displayed next to their username in chat, as well as access to channel-specific emotes that can be used across the service. Due to its popularity, other competing livestreaming platforms have specifically emulated Twitch's subscriptions model, such as YouTube (which introduced a similar "channel memberships" feature in 2018 with similar perks, after having already introduced "super chats" as an equivalent to Twitch's "cheering" feature the previous year) and the now-defunct Mixer.

== Mechanics ==
At the beginning of a subathon, a countdown clock begins with a specific amount of time, with the event concluding once time expires. If a viewer to the channel purchases a subscription or otherwise makes a donation to the channel, an allotment of additional time is added to the countdown. As Twitch also allows viewers to purchase subscriptions as gifts in bulk that are randomly awarded to other viewers, "gift subs" can often lead to major spikes in the time remaining in a short period of time (to the point that some subathons may choose to place a cap on the amount of time that can be added at once via gift subs). Some subathons are meant as charity events, with a portion of proceeds being donated after the conclusion of the event.

The stream usually stays online for the entire duration of the event, usually being filled with variety content such as video gaming, challenges, and appearances by special guests (such as the host's friends, or in more prominent cases, celebrities). In some cases, a subathon contains elements of lifecasting, with Ludwig's 2021 subathon sometimes featuring him cooking food, exercising in his garage, and at one point, showering (albeit wearing shorts). Breaks (such as for sleep) are often covered with pre-recorded content, or appearances by one or more guests.

A variant of the event is a "reverse subathon", in which new subscriptions and donations reduce the time remaining rather than add time.

== Notable examples ==
The format was popularized by Ludwig Ahgren, who held a 31-day subathon in 2021; at the conclusion of the event, Ludwig had amassed 282,191 subscriptions at the stream's end, becoming Twitch's most-subscribed channel and breaking a record for concurrent subscribers originally set by Ninja.

The VTuber Ironmouse has held several notable subathons; the first held in February 2022 lasted 31 days, and concluded with Ironmouse becoming the most-subscribed female streamer on Twitch. A second subathon was held in 2023 in support of the Immune Deficiency Foundation, with half of all revenue from Twitch monetization and merchandise sales being donated.

Kai Cenat would hold his first subathon Mafiathon in 2023, where he would overtake Ludwig with a record 306,621 subscribers. During a third subathon in September 2024, Ironmouse set a new record for most concurrent subscribers, beating Kai Cenat's prior record with 312,000 subscribers. Kai Cenat would, in turn, break Ironmouse's record during Mafiathon 2 in November 2024, concluding with a record 728,535 subscribers.

=== Longest subathons by duration ===
While subathons popularized by Ludwig and Kai Cenat focused on maximizing subscriber counts within capped timeframes, other streamers have pursued uncapped subathons lasting hundreds of days. As of January 2026, the longest subathon on Twitch is held by Emilycc at over 1,542 days (still ongoing), followed by SweatyPedals (1,130+ days, ongoing) and Beard_Hub (1,032+ days, ongoing). The longest completed subathon was held by TieflingMelissa at 500 days, followed by Brazilian streamer oMeiaUm at 383 days, which concluded in May 2025.

== See also ==
- Telethon
