= List of most-subscribed Twitch channels =

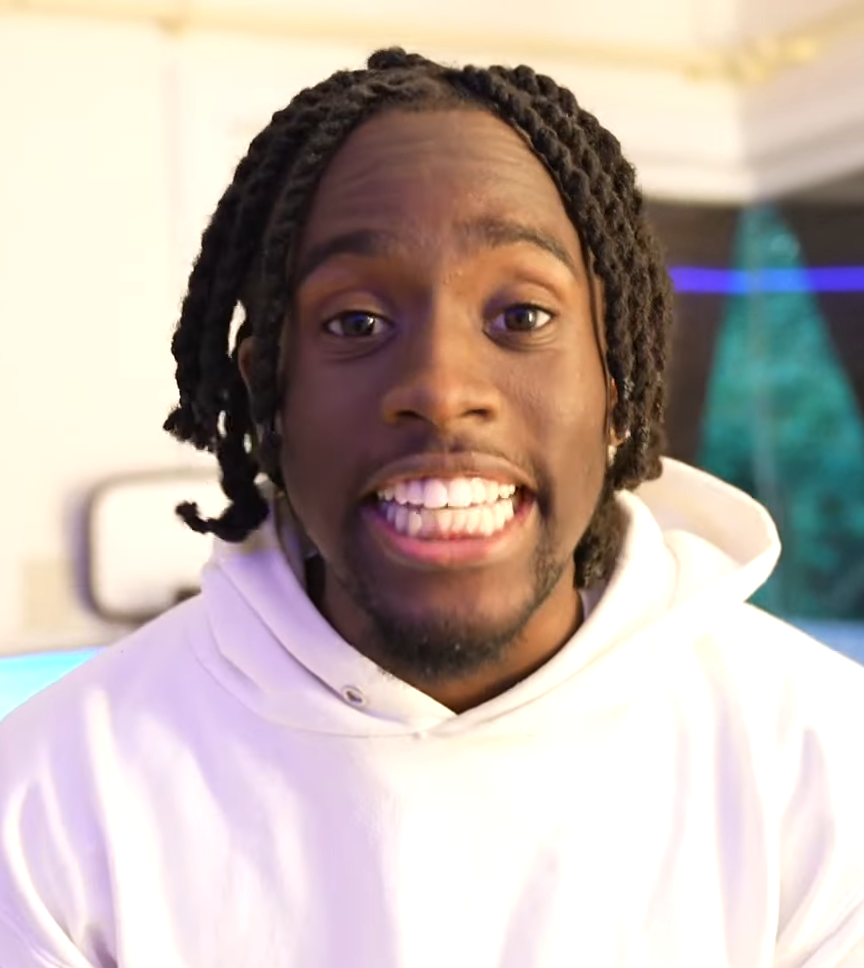
As of October 2026, Kai Cenat holds the record for the most-subscribed channel on Twitch of all time.

A subscription on Twitch is a way for users to support streamers and creators on the platform using real money. Content creators can offer custom emotes, badges, and more to subscribers. Users can also gift subscriptions to others, so subscriber numbers can increase. A subscription expires after one month and can be renewed for a "subscription streak".

As of January 6, 2026, Kai Cenat holds the most-subscribed channel on Twitch of all time, with 1,112,947 subscribers.

== History ==
=== Most-subscribed Twitch channels ===
In April 2018, Tyler Blevins, known by his Twitch username Ninja, held the record for the most-subscribed Twitch streamer with 269,154 subscribers until April 2021, when Ludwig Ahgren broke the record during his subathon with 283,066 subscribers. Later in March 2023, Kai Cenat broke Ahgren's record during his subathon with 306,621 subscribers until September 30, 2024, when VTuber Ironmouse broke the record during her subathon with 313,000 subscribers at the time. On November 11, 2024, Cenat broke the record again during his month-long subathon, Mafiathon 2, with 337,000 subscribers at the time. Later on November 30, 2024, Cenat ended his subathon with 728,535 subscribers, doubling the previous record held by Ironmouse. On September 28, 2025, Cenat reached one million subscribers on Twitch during his Mafiathon 3 subathon, breaking his own previous record and becoming the first streamer in the platform’s history to surpass one million active subscribers. On September 30, 2025, he ended his subathon with 1,112,947 subscribers.

=== Most-subscribed female Twitch channels ===
In November 2021, Kim Mi-Young, known by her Twitch username kkatamina, held the record for the most-subscribed female Twitch streamer with 73,623 subscribers until March 2022, when VTuber Ironmouse broke the record during her 31-day subathon with 171,818 subscribers. A year later, in July 2023, Ironmouse broke her own record during her subathon with 205,488 subscribers. Later on September 30, 2024, Ironmouse broke Twitch's and her own personal record during her subathon with 313,000 subscribers becoming the most-subscribed Twitch channel of all time until Kai Cenat broke the record on November 11, 2024.

== List of most-subscribed Twitch channels ==
The following table lists the top 50 most-subscribed channels on Twitch as of October 2026, as well as the primary category or categories in which they stream. The channels are ordered by number of most-subscribed.

Rank	Channel	Owner	Total subscribers	Achievement date	Streamed categories
1	KaiCenat	Kai Cenat	1,112,947	September 2025	Various games, chatting
2	evelone2004	Vadim Kozakov	459,924	December 2024	Chatting, Counter-Strike
3	vedal987	Vedal	343,215	January 2026	Chatting, Software and Game Development, various games
4	ironmouse	Ironmouse	327,519	October 2026	Various games, chatting
5	jasontheween	Jason Nguyen	327,278	October 2025	Chatting
6	Ludwig	Ludwig Ahgren	283,066	April 2021	Various games, chatting
7	Ninja	Tyler Blevins	269,154	April 2018	Fortnite
8	Jynxzi	Nicholas Stewart	179,543	February 2024	Tom Clancy's Rainbow Six Siege
9	Ibai	Ibai Llanos	164,107	July 2025	Special events, various games, chatting
10	Casimito	Casimiro Ferreira	159,487	November 2022	Chatting, sports
11	Pestily	Paul Licari	141,395	December 2025	Escape from Tarkov
12	Adapt	Alexander Prynkiewicz	140,108	October 2025	Chatting, Fortnite, Call of Duty: Warzone
13	CriticalRole	Critical Role	139,559	November 2021	Dungeons & Dragons
14	stableronaldo	Rani Netz	134,423	October 2025	Fortnite, chatting
15	Shlorox	Shlorox	123,516	February 2025	Grand Theft Auto V, chatting
16	SondergaardLol	Rasmus Søndergaard	129,152	October 2026	Chatting, games
16	RanbooLive	Ranboo	116,870	August 2021	Minecraft, chatting
17	LVNDMARK	LVNDMARK	115,384	December 2025	Escape from Tarkov
18	lacy	Nick Fosco	110,060	October 2025	Chatting, Fortnite, Grand Theft Auto V
19	yourragegaming	yourragegaming	104,281	October 2025	Chatting, games
20	silky	Silky	103,225	October 2025	Chatting, games
21	kaysan	Kaysan	103,109	October 2025	Chatting, games
22	Gaules	Alexandre Chiqueta	102,857	June 2022	Counter-Strike
23	xQc	Félix Lengyel	102,288	May 2022	Various games, Overwatch, chatting
24	Shroud	Michael Grzesiek	101,588	March 2019	Valorant, various games
25	plaqueboymax	Maxwell Dent	100,492	August 2026	Chatting
26	summit1g	Jaryd Lazar	94,941	May 2020	Counter-Strike 2, various games
27	MichiMochievee	Michi Mochievee	90,181	August 2025	Various games, chatting
28	caseoh_	Case Baker	89,238	January 2025	Various games, chatting
29	TheGrefg	David Martínez	88,585	January 2022	Fortnite, Minecraft, various games, chatting
30	eliasn97	Elias Nerlich	85,475	September 2023	Chatting, Fortnite
31	HasanAbi	Hasan Piker	85,125	November 2024	Chatting
32	PirateSoftware	Jason Hall	80,861	April 2024	Software & Game development
33	NICKMERCS	Nick Kolcheff	80,402	April 2021	Apex Legends, Fortnite
34	kkatamina	Kim Mi-young	73,623	November 2021	Chatting, Valorant
35	PointCrow	Eric Morino	72,533	May 2022	The Legend of Zelda: Breath of the Wild, Various games
36	AlveusSanctuary	Alveus Sanctuary (Maya Higa)	72,169	June 2026	Chatting, Animals, Aquariums, and Zoos
37	Fextralife	Fextralife	72,090	July 2023	The Elder Scrolls Online, Diablo IV
38	AdinRoss	Adin Ross	71,318	September 2021	Various games, chatting
39	Zizaran	Kjetil	71,258	January 2025	Path of Exile
40	Zeudidipalma01	Zeudi Di Palma	71,212	March 2026	Chatting, tattoo artist
41	DDG	Darryl Granberry Jr.	70,898	April 2025	Chatting
42	Tumblurr	Gianmarco Tocco	70,656	October 2024	Chatting, various games
43	Anomaly	Ludwig Lagerstedt	70,420	May 2020	Counter-Strike: Global Offensive
44	Trymacs	Maximilian Stemmler	70,196	February 2021	Fortnite, Clash Royale
45	Tfue	Turner Tenney	69,586	February 2019	Apex Legends, Fortnite
46	月希 (tsukilin)	tsukilin	68,906	September 2023	Chatting, various games
47	ChristinaandAmber	Christina Ottrando and Amber Lawes	68,718	December 2025	Chatting
48	SheefGG	SheefGG	67,814	December 2025	Escape from Tarkov
49	DarioMocciaTwitch	Dario Moccia	63,016	December 2023	Chatting
50	MontanaBlack88	MontanaBlack	62,862	December 2025	Chatting, various games
