= Kai Cenat =

American online streamer (born 2001)

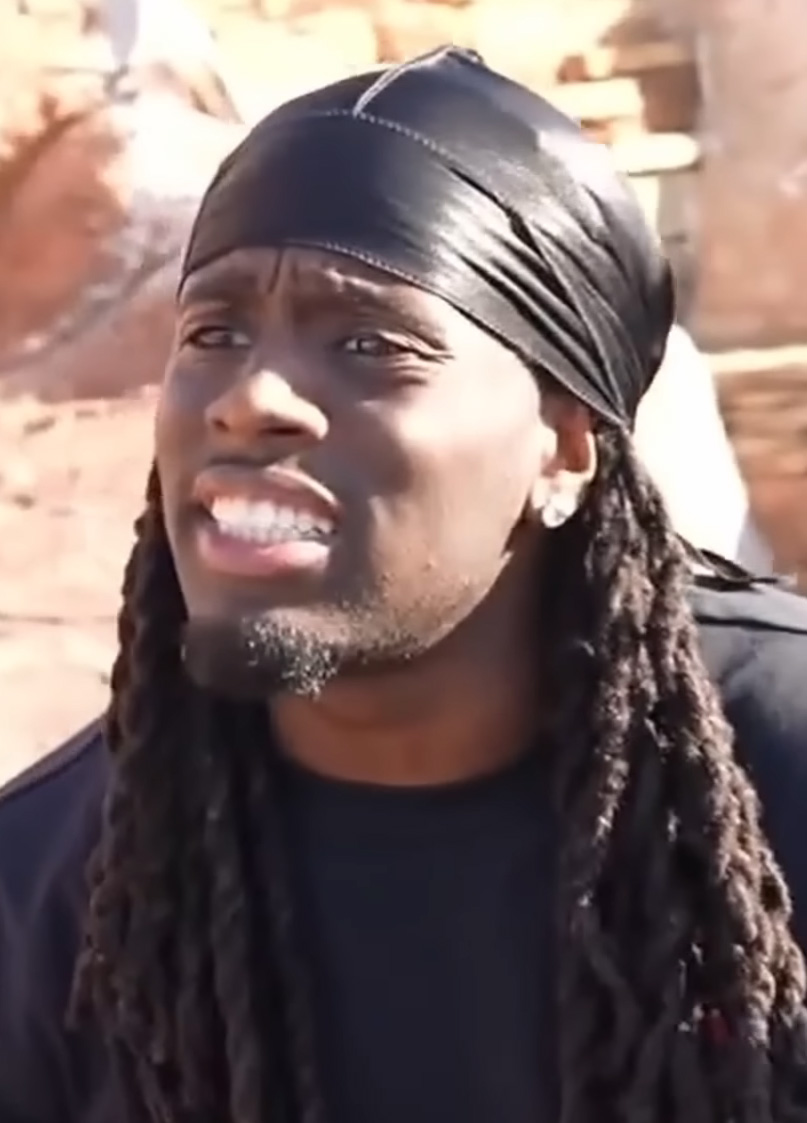
- Cenat in 2025
- Born: Kai Carlo Cenat III; December 16, 2001 (age 24); New York City, U.S.
- Education: State University of New York, Morrisville (attended)
- Occupations: Twitch streamer; YouTuber; rapper
- Years active: 2018–present
- Known for: Twitch; Celebrity guests; Viral phrases; AMP; Mafiathon; Vivet

Twitch information
- Channel: kaicenat
- Years active: 2021–present
- Genres: Gaming; Just Chatting
- Followers: 21.6 million

YouTube information
- Channels: Kai Cenat; kai’s Mind
- Years active: 2018–present
- Genres: Comedy; lifestyle
- Subscribers: 8.25 million
- Views: 445 million
- Last updated: October 26, 2026

Kai Carlo Cenat III (/ˈkaɪ səˈnæt/ KY sə-NAT; born December 16, 2001) is an American online streamer, YouTuber, and internet personality who specializes in comedic live streams and videos. As of 2026, he is the most-subscribed Twitch streamer in the world, as well as the most-followed Twitch streamer with 21 million followers. Cenat is a member of the streamer collective AMP and the creator of Streamer University, a reality streaming show which features an in-person boot camp for content creators of the same name.

Regarded as one of the most popular online streamers in the world, he is known for popularizing several viral internet phrases like Rizz, Fanum tax, and Gyatt. Cenat has achieved significant milestones in the streaming community, notably becoming the first Twitch streamer to surpass 500,000 subscribers during his "Mafiathon 2" subathon in November 2024, and repeating the feat with 1,000,000 subscribers during his "Mafiathon 3" subathon in September 2025.

== Early life and education ==
Kai Carlo Cenat III was born on December 16, 2001, in Brooklyn, New York City, to parents from the Caribbean; his mother is from Trinidad and Tobago and his father is from Haiti. Cenat was raised by his mother along with his three other siblings, a twin sister named Kaiya, an older brother named Devonte, and a younger brother named Kaleel.

Cenat attended Frederick Douglass Academy for his secondary education. He graduated from high school in 2019 and attended the State University of New York at Morrisville shortly after, to study business administration. He dropped out in 2020 after struggling to keep up with both schoolwork and content creation.

== Career ==
=== 2018–2021: Early career ===
Cenat uploaded his first YouTube video on January 13, 2018, and began making videos surrounding pranks and challenges. He joined the YouTube group AMP after being discovered by fellow Bronx-born YouTuber Fanum. He started regularly appearing in the channel's videos. He began streaming on Twitch in February 2021 after migrating from YouTube, broadcasting video gaming and reaction content.

=== 2022: Initial popularity ===
In 2022, Cenat began including celebrity guests on his streams, including Bobby Shmurda in April, Lil Baby in October, and 21 Savage in November, who helped him receive his highest viewership at the time with 283,245 concurrent viewers at its peak.

On May 8, Cenat released his debut single "Bustdown Rollie Avalanche" with NLE Choppa, that was later certified Gold by RIAA. Cenat had an acting role in the trailer for Polo G's June 2022 single "Distraction".

In October, Cenat was nominated for the 12th Streamy Awards in the "Streamer of the Year" and "Breakout Streamer" categories, winning the former in December.

=== 2023: Mafiathon ===
On January 31, Cenat began a month-long subathon, titled Mafiathon, which featured guests such as G Herbo, NLE Choppa, Skai Jackson, KSI, DDG, Rubi Rose, and Autumn Falls. On February 16, he signed with United Talent Agency for representation in all areas. On February 28, he became the most-subscribed Twitch streamer of all time at the time, reaching 306,621 subscribers at its peak. His record lasted until September 2024, when it was broken by Ironmouse.

In March, Cenat was reported to be making approximately $23,280 per month from his sleep streams, resulting in an annual income of $285,480. According to Streams Charts, his sleeping broadcasts have amassed over 5.6 million hours watched, showcasing the significant viewer engagement during these streams. On March 11, Cenat won "Streamer of the Year" at the 2023 Streamer Awards.

On April 17, Cenat was temporarily suspended on Twitch for reasons undisclosed, though he eventually returned, with him initially noting it as a permanent ban in error. Later that month, he appeared on Rolling Stone's list of the 20 Most Influential Creators in 2023. In May, Cenat announced a livestreamed show with IShowSpeed exclusively on Rumble, titled the Kai 'N Speed Show. On August 27, Cenat won the "Streamer of the Year" award at the 13th Streamy Awards. He was also nominated for "Just Chatting" awards at the same ceremony.

On August 4, 2023, Cenat announced a giveaway of PlayStation 5 consoles and gift cards, in Union Square, Manhattan with Twitch streamer Fanum. Thousands of his followers appeared at the impromptu event, which soon spiraled out of control and devolved into a riot. The New York City Police Department (NYPD) mobilized forces in the area as a large group swarmed a Best Buy and other businesses in the area. Cenat was arrested by the NYPD for inciting civil unrest; police also made 65 other arrests. He was later charged by the NYPD with first-degree rioting, inciting a riot, and unlawful assembly. Later in May 2024, Manhattan district attorney Alvin Bragg dropped charges against Cenat, Denzel Dennis, and Muktar Din, in exchange for an apology and US$57,000 in restitution.

In September, Cenat was featured on the music video for Offset's single "Fan" alongside Fanum. In the following month, he made his music video directorial debut with American rapper a Boogie wit da Hoodie. On September 9, he participated in the Sidemen charity match at London Stadium, playing for YouTube Allstars. On September 26, Forbes ranked him 44th on its Top Creators list, earning an estimated $4.7 million in 2023. On December 14, Nicki Minaj appeared on Cenat's stream which broke his previous peak viewership record by 40,000 resulting in 348,593 concurrent viewers.

=== 2024: Mafiathon 2 ===
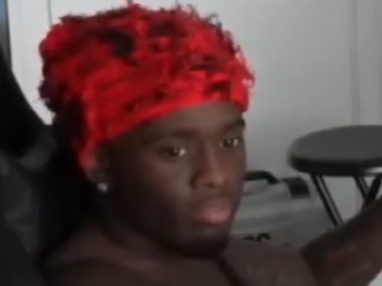
Cenat in 2024

In 2024 Cenat became the first streamer to get signed with Nike. Later on February 17, Cenat won "Streamer of the Year" and "Best Just Chatting Streamer" at the February 2024 Streamer Awards. He was also nominated for "Best Streamed Event" at the same ceremony.

On June 2, Cenat along with AMP collaborated with Beta Squad, a British YouTube group, and held a charity soccer match at Selhurst Park, London, England. The event raised funds for The Water Project. The match ended in a 6–6 draw after a pitch invasion forced the game to be called off. On July 13, he appeared and participated in a MrBeast video titled "50 YouTubers Fight for $1,000,000". In August, Rolling Stone listed Cenat at number 1 on their "25 Most Influential Creators of 2024" list, as the most-subscribed Twitch influencer. In October, McDonald's announced that they had teamed up with Cenat to promote the launch of chicken Big Mac in the US. Later that month, Forbes ranked him 24th on its Top Creators list, earning an estimated $8.5 million in 2024.

On November 1, Cenat began his second month-long subathon, titled Mafiathon 2, with 20% of the proceeds made from subscriptions going towards building a school in Nigeria. The subathon featured numerous guests such as Lil Uzi Vert, Miranda Cosgrove, Snoop Dogg, Quavo, GloRilla, members of the cast from the Disney Channel sitcom Good Luck Charlie, Kodak Black, Denzel Curry, Serena Williams, Marshmello, the Jabbawockeez, Soulja Boy, Bill Nye, Andre Iguodala, Lil Dicky, Ibai Llanos, Benny Blanco, Chris Brown, Lizzo, SZA, Ludwig Ahgren, Lil Yachty, Travis Barker, Mark Rober, Sexyy Red, Druski, Kevin Hart, Kyrie Irving, NPC Miles Morales, and Ironmouse. A day after the subathon started, Cenat was banned on Twitch for six minutes after he got swatted. On November 11, Cenat reclaimed the record of being the most-subscribed Twitch streamer, with 337,000 subscribers at the time.

On November 26, Cenat drew backlash after showing magician Max Major hanging himself as a stunt on his Mafiathon 2 stream. Cenat claims that Major had lied to him and his production team on the details behind the stunt and Major refused to return to the stream to apologize. Cenat also proceeded to ban any future magician acts from his streams. On December 11, Major released a statement on social media, stating that he did not lie to Cenat's team and the stunt had been already cleared by Twitch. On November 30, Cenat ended his month-long subathon with 728,535 subscribers, doubling the previous record held by Ironmouse.

In December, Cenat won Best Just Chatting Streamer, Best Marathon Stream, and Best Streamed Collab (for a sleepover stream with Kevin Hart and Druski) at second iteration of The Streamer Awards that year. He was also nominated for Gamer of the Year and Streamer of the Year.

=== 2025: Streamer University and Mafiathon 3 ===
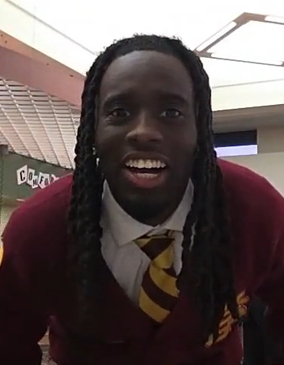
Cenat in 2025 at Streamer University

In January 2025, Cenat made an appearance for WWE on the January 27 episode of Raw, where he announced that he will be attending the Royal Rumble event and called out IShowSpeed. On March 8, Cenat participated in the 2025 Sidemen Charity Match, held at Wembley Stadium in London, United Kingdom, playing for the YouTube Allstars team. He managed to score a goal in the 68th minute. On May 22, Cenat began his three-day long Streamer University a reality streaming show where Cenat selected 120 content creators to gather at the University of Akron campus in Akron, Ohio to "have the opportunity to showcase their personalities and brand and meet other creators". The event also featured other content creators, including DDG and ExtraEmily, acting as professors to mentor the 120 selectees through various topics such as "internet beef" and improv. On September 1, Cenat began his third and final month-long subathon, titled Mafiathon 3, with 15% of the proceeds made from subscriptions continuing to go towards building the Nigerian school that was announced for the last subathon. The subathon featured numerous guests such as Miles Caton, the Jabbawockeez, Kim Kardashian, Roman Atwood, Ray J, Mariah Carey, Lizzo, Ice Spice, Latto, and Linkin Park.

In November 2025, he set a record on Twitch by became the first streamer to ever hit 20 million followers and 1 million subscribers.

=== 2026: Career expansion, break from streaming, and Streamer University 2 ===
On January 13, 2026, Cenat released a YouTube video titled "I Quit", in which he announced a shift from streaming to broader pursuits. In the video, he addressed his mental health, citing self-doubt and a need to reset from his streaming schedule. The video also served as the launch for his clothing brand, "Vivet", which he developed after traveling to Italy where he participated in the sewing and production of the line's apparel. In early 2026, Cenat began a series of daily livestreams focused on reading aloud to improve his literacy. Educators noted the positive impact of these broadcasts, crediting Cenat with normalizing reading challenges and encouraging literacy among young audiences. On July 6, 2026, Cenat returned to streaming on Twitch after a nine-month hiatus to unveil the students and professors of Streamer University 2, which ran from July 15 to July 20 at the Hendrix College campus in Conway, Arkansas. On September 12, 2026 Kai presented Vivet’s inaugural fashion show in New York City during New York Fashion Week, marking the brand’s runway debut.

== Cultural impact ==
Cenat is credited with popularizing viral internet slang words such as rizz, which is derived from "charisma" and defined as "style, charm, or attractiveness"; and gyatt, a permutation of "Goddamn" that is used in reference to a person with prominent buttocks. Oxford University Press named Rizz its word of the year for 2023, and Gyatt was nominated for the American Dialect Society's 2023 Word of The Year. In July 2025, Cenat was named in Time magazine's inaugural "TIME100 Creators" list – branded by the publication as the 100 most influential digital voices.

Cenat was added to Fortnite as part of their Icon Series, being added to the game on September 12, 2025.

== Personal life ==
Cenat is a Christian.

In December 2024, Cenat was reported to be in a relationship with TikTok influencer Gabrielle Alayah; he confirmed the relationship during his birthday livestream following months of fan speculation. The couple separated in late 2025.

== Discography ==
=== Singles ===
List of singles
Title	Year	Certifications	Album
"Bustdown Rollie Avalanche" (featuring NLE Choppa)	2022	RIAA: Gold	Non-album singles
"Dogs" (with IShowSpeed)	2023		Non-album singles
"EBK"	2026		Non-album singles

=== Guest appearances ===
List of non-single guest appearances, with other performing artists
Title	Year	Other artist(s)	Album
"The End of the Road Begins – Intro"	2023	—N/a	Fast X (Official Motion Picture Soundtrack)
"Truth in the Lies"	2025	Central Cee, Lil Durk	Can't Rush Greatness

== Filmography ==
=== Film ===
Year	Title	Role	Notes
2023	Good Burger 2	Disgruntled customer	Guest appearance
2023	Global Pursuit	Miller	Short film
2026	Scary Movie	Himself	

=== Music videos ===
Year	Title	Artist(s)
2020	"Shoot"	Adot
2022	"Distraction"	Polo G
2022	"Just Wanna Rock"	Lil Uzi Vert
2022	"Plenty"	FaZe Kaysan feat. Nardo Wick, G Herbo, Babyface Ray & BIG30
2023	"Fan"	Offset
2025	"Truth in the Lies"	Central Cee feat. Lil Durk

== Awards and nominations ==
Awards and nominations for Cenat
Year	Ceremony	Category	Nominated work	Result	Ref.
2022	12th Streamy Awards	Streamer of the Year	—N/a	Won	
2022	12th Streamy Awards	Breakout Streamer	—N/a	Nominated	
2022	The Streamer Awards	Streamer of the Year	—N/a	Won	
2023	The Esports Awards	Streamer of the Year	—N/a	Nominated	
2023	13th Streamy Awards	Streamer of the Year	—N/a	Won	
2023	13th Streamy Awards	Just Chatting	—N/a	Won	
2023	The Streamer Awards	Streamer of the Year	—N/a	Won	
2023	The Streamer Awards	Best Just Chatting Streamer	—N/a	Won	
2023	The Streamer Awards	Best Streamed Event	7 Days In	Nominated	
2024	Kids' Choice Awards	Favorite Gamer	—N/a	Won	
2024	The Streamer Awards	Best Streamed Collab	Sleepover Stream with Kevin Hart & Druski	Won	
2024	The Streamer Awards	Best Marathon Stream	Mafiathon 2	Won	
2024	The Streamer Awards	Best Just Chatting Streamer	—N/a	Won	
2024	The Streamer Awards	Gamer of the Year	—N/a	Nominated	
2024	The Streamer Awards	Streamer of the Year	—N/a	Nominated	
2025	Kids' Choice Awards	Favorite Gamer	—N/a	Nominated	
2025	The Streamer Awards	Streamer of the Year	—N/a	Nominated	
2025	The Streamer Awards	Best Just Chatting Streamer	—N/a	Won	
2025	The Streamer Awards	Best Streamed Event	Streamer University	Won	
2025	The Streamer Awards	Best Marathon Stream	Mafiathon 3	Won	
2025	The Streamer Awards	Best Streamed Collab	Kai Cenat & LeBron James	Won	
2025	The Game Awards	Content Creator of the Year	—N/a	Nominated	
2025	The Esports Awards	Streamer of the Year	—N/a	Nominated	
2026	The Esports Awards	Streamer of the Year	—N/a	Pending	
2026	Kids' Choice Awards	Favorite Male Creator	—N/a	Pending	
2026	The Streamer Awards	League of Their Own	—N/a	Pending	
2026	The Streamer Awards	Best Mainstream Collab	Kai Cenat & Tyla	Pending	
2026	The Streamer Awards	Best Marathon Stream	Minecraft Marathon with IShowSpeed	Pending	
2026	The Streamer Awards	Best Streamed Event	Streamer University	Pending	

=== Listicles ===
Publisher	Year	Listicle	Result	Ref.
Forbes	2023	Top Creators	44th	
Forbes	2024	Top Creators	24th	
Rolling Stone	2023	20 Most Influential Creators	—N/a	
Rolling Stone	2024	25 Most Influential Creators	1st	
Rolling Stone	2025	25 Most Influential Creators	4th	

== See also ==
- List of most-subscribed Twitch channels
- List of most-followed Twitch channels
- List of YouTubers
