= Duke Dennis =

American online streamer and media personality (born 1994)

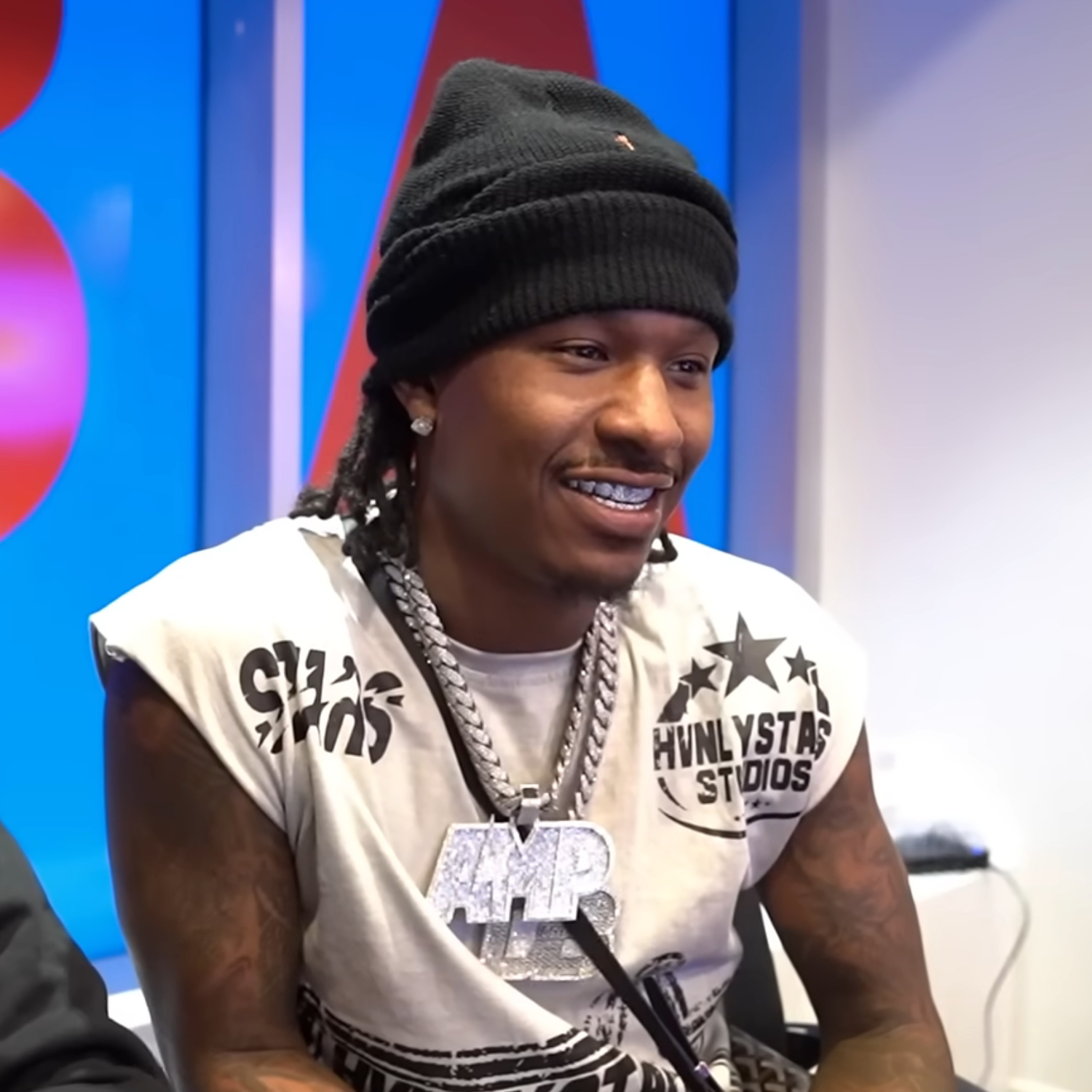
- Dennis in 2023
- Born: Denzel Shaquille Dennis; February 26, 1994 (age 32); Greenville, South Carolina, U.S.
- Other names: • DeeBlock Duke • AMP Duke • The Big Drop
- Occupations: YouTuber; online streamer; social media personality

Twitch information
- Channel: Duke
- Years active: 2020–present
- Genres: Gaming; basketball; lifestyle
- Followers: 3.5 million

YouTube information
- Channel: Duke Dennis
- Years active: 2017–present
- Genre: Comedy
- Subscribers: 3.63 million
- Views: 256 million
- Military career
- Branch: United States Army
- Service years: 2013–2017
- Stationed in: Germany
- Last updated: November 15, 2026

Denzel Shaquille Dennis (born February 26, 1994), better known online as Duke Dennis, is an American YouTuber, online streamer, and media personality. Dennis is known for his content centered around NBA 2K, live streams, and being a member of the streamer collective, AMP.

== Early life ==
Dennis was born on February 26, 1994, in Greenville, South Carolina. His childhood involved living in various states, including Georgia and Alabama. During his high school years, Dennis participated in football and received multiple offers to play at the collegiate level. However, he opted to decline these opportunities.

Following high school, Dennis enlisted in the United States Army in 2013. After completing basic training, he was stationed in Germany. He fulfilled a four-year contract, concluding his military service in 2017. Upon his discharge from the army, Dennis made a deliberate choice to pursue a full-time career in YouTube and content creation.

Dennis has two younger brothers, who have appeared in several of his videos. In late 2021, he showed his support for his family by purchasing a new home for his mother.

== Career ==
=== YouTube ===
Dennis initiated his content creation journey after completing his military service. He initially gained popularity by uploading videos related to the basketball simulation game NBA 2K17 on his YouTube channel. His channel experienced rapid growth, reaching 100,000 subscribers by 2018.

Currently, Dennis manages three YouTube channels: "Duke Dennis Gaming," which is his most subscribed channel, "DeeBlock Duke Dennis," and "Duke Dennis Live". His primary content continues to focus on the NBA 2K series, featuring gameplay, character builds, and strategic advice.

=== Twitch ===
Dennis started streaming on Twitch on March 3, 2016. While his YouTube content primarily focuses on gaming, his Twitch presence predominantly features "Just Chatting" content, although he occasionally streams other games like Call of Duty.

His expertise within the content creation community is further demonstrated by his role as a "professor" at Kai Cenat's "Streamer University." In this capacity, he delivered talks and workshops on subjects such as personal branding and content creation.

On August 27, 2023, Duke Dennis was nominated for the sports category in the 13th Streamy Awards.

Complex ranked Dennis 4th on their best 25 streamers of 2024. In 2024, Rolling Stone listed Duke Dennis among the "25 Most Influential Creators of 2024," ranking him in the top five. Duke Dennis participated in AMP's 2024 Freshman Cypher.

=== AMP membership ===
Dennis is a foundational and prominent member of Any Means Possible (AMP), an American content collective. He is one of the first and founding members, but also the oldest. The collective was established with the shared objective of building a collectively owned entity and producing high-quality content. His affiliation with AMP has significantly contributed to his increased public profile, with sources indicating a substantial rise in his prominence since joining the group.

AMP is known for its collaborative challenge videos, in which Dennis actively participates. The collective has garnered considerable industry recognition, including winning "Lifestyle Creators of the Year" at the 2023 Streamy Awards and "Best Content Organization" at the 2024 Streamer Awards.

== Awards ==
Year	Ceremony	Category	Result	Ref.
2023	13th Streamy Awards	Sports	Nominated	
