= SourceHOV =

American company

SourceHOV, Inc.
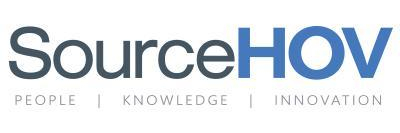
- Type: Private
- Industry: Software, information technology
- Predecessor: Lason, HOV Services, SourceCorp
- Founded: 2011
- Defunct: 2017
- Successor: Exela Technologies
- Headquarters: Dallas, Texas, United States
- Key people: Par Chadha; (Chairman); Jim Reynolds; (Co-Chairman); Ronald C. Cogburn; (CEO)
- Services: enterprise information management, Transaction processing services
- Number of employees: 16000
- Website: www.sourcehov.com

SourceHOV LLC was an American technology-enabled business services company headquartered in Dallas, Texas. It provided enterprise information management and transaction processing services in the BPO industry. In February 2017, Novitex Enterprise Solutions, SourceHOV and Quinpario Acquisition Corp. 2 announced that they will merge to create Exela Technologies, a solutions provider for financial technology and business services.

== History ==
In 2007, HandsOn Global Management LLC (HGM) acquired Lason, a provider of document management outsourcing services. This acquisition led to the creation of HOV Services (HOVS), a company providing transaction processing services to corporations. Subsequently, SourceHOV was formed as the merger in May 2011 of HOV Services, and SourceCORP, a business process outsourcing company. These companies were respectively owned by Apollo Global Management LLC until 2013, CVCI (The Rohatyn Group) until 2014 and HGM and affiliates that remained the majority shareholder. Following this merger, HGM and Apollo created a new corporation called SCH Services, Inc in Delaware. As a result, SCH renamed and became SourceHOV Holdings, Inc., and SourceCorp, SourceHOV LLC. In December 2013, several notable companies expressed interest in acquiring SourceHOV.

In 2014, SourceHOV acquired BancTec Inc., a provider of transaction processing services to commercial banks, governments, insurance companies and large organizations. This acquisition enabled SourceHOV to expand its operations and services into international banking and payments.

In 2016, SourceHOV further transformed into a service provider for larger industries and incorporated key technologies with the acquisition of TransCentra, Inc., a provider of integrated billing, remittance processing, imaging software and consulting services. The addition of TransCentra improved SourceHOV's position in banking and payment.

In February 2017, SourceHOV, LLC, Novitex Holdings, Inc and Quinpario Acquisition Corp. 2, a Special-purpose acquisition company, agreed to merge and create Exela Technologies a large provider of financial technology and business services to blue chip clients. This transaction, valued at $2.8 billion, is expected to close during the second quarter of 2017.

== Overview ==
SourceHOV specializes in transactions for international industries including financial services, health care, public sector organizations, insurance, and legal organizations. SourceHOV offers workflow management system and business process outsourcing (BPO) services that enable companies to automate complex, data-intensive transactions. The company's business transaction management services include accounts management, financial, healthcare, insurance and risk management services.

== Mergers and acquisitions ==
Date	Name	Industry	Disposition
2007	Lason	Business process outsourcing (BPO)	Subsidiary (acquisition)
2011	HOV Services	Transaction processing services	Subsidiary (acquisition)
2011	SourceCorp	BPO	Subsidiary (acquisition)
2014	BancTec	Transaction processing services	Subsidiary (acquisition)
2016	TransCentra	Transaction processing services	Subsidiary (acquisition)
2017	Exela Technologies	Information and transaction processing	New company (merger)
