= Volker Oppitz =

Volker Oppitz is the name of:

- Volker Oppitz (scientist) (born 1931), German economist and mathematician
- Volker Oppitz (footballer) (born 1978), son of the former and player for Dynamo Dresden
