= List of Sigma Delta Tau chapters =

Sigma Delta Tau is an American sorority. Jewish students founded it at Cornell University in 1917. In the following list, its active chapters are indicated in bold and its inactive chapters are in italics.

Chapter	Charter date and range	Institution	Location	Status	Ref.
**Alpha**	March 17, 1917	Cornell University	Ithaca, New York	Active	
**Beta**	June 20, 1920 – 1971; 1980	University of Pennsylvania	Philadelphia, Pennsylvania	Active	(Note: Chapter formed by absorbing Sigma Lambda Sigma, established in 1920. After going dormant, it reformed as a colony in 1979.)
Gamma	February 26, 1921 – 1999	Ohio State University	Columbus, Ohio	Inactive	
Delta	April 17, 1921 – 1972; 1983 - 2026	University at Buffalo	Buffalo, New York	Inactive	
Epsilon	January 6, 1923 – 1954; 1959–1997	University of Cincinnati	Cincinnati, Ohio	Inactive	(Note: Chapter reformed in 1959 by absorbing Pi Alpha Mu, established in 1957.)
Zeta	March 7, 1924 – 1954; 1966–1969	Louisiana State University	Baton Rouge, Louisiana	Inactive	
**Eta**	April 6, 1924 – 1929; 1945	University of Georgia	Athens, Georgia	Active	(Note: After going dormant, this chapter was reformed in 1945 by absorbing Sigma Tau (local), established in 1938.)
Theta	May 23, 1925 – 1970	University of Nebraska	Lincoln, Nebraska	Inactive	
Iota	February 20, 1926 – 1971	McGill University	Montreal, Quebec, Canada	Inactive	
**Kappa**	March 6, 1926	University of Illinois Urbana-Champaign	Champaign, Illinois	Active	(Note: Chapter formed by absorbing Theta Nu, established in 1924.)
Lambda	July 19, 1927 – 1937; 1948–1987	University of California, Los Angeles	Los Angeles, California	Inactive	(Note: Chapter formed by absorbing Beta Tau Sigma, established in 1926. After going dormant, it reformed by absorbing Omega Pi, established in 1946.)
Mu	July 18, 1927 – 1935; 2007–2017	University of Southern California	Los Angeles, California	Inactive	(Note: Chapter reformed in 2007 by absorbing Alpha Gamma Gamma, established in 2000.)
Nu	October 21, 1929 – 1994	University of Minnesota	Minneapolis, Minnesota	Inactive	(Note: Chapter formed by absorbing Scroll & Key, established in 1916.)
Xi	September 14, 1929 – 1943; 1946–1975	University of Oklahoma	Norman, Oklahoma	Inactive	
Omicron	February 5, 1934 – 1951; 1965–1969	West Virginia University	Morgantown, West Virginia	Inactive	(Note: Chapter reformed by absorbing Sigma Delta, established in 1964.)
Pi	April 8, 1933 – 1961; 1982–1988	University of Iowa	Iowa City, Iowa	Inactive	
**Rho**	May 10, 1935	University of Alabama	Tuscaloosa, Alabama	Active	(Note: Chapter formed by absorbing Theta Kappa, established in 1932.)
Sigma	April 24, 1938 – 1983	Northwestern University	Evanston, Illinois	Inactive	(Note: Chapter formed by absorbing Kappa Zeta Kappa, established in 1935.)
Tau	March 4, 1939 – 2022	University of Texas	Austin, Texas	Inactive	
**Upsilon**	April 20, 1940	Indiana University	Bloomington, Indiana	Active	(Note: Chapter formed by absorbing Sigma Phi Upsilon, established in 1934.)
**Phi**	February 20, 1943 – 1971; 1980	Pennsylvania State University	State College, Pennsylvania	Active	(Note: Chapter formed by absorbing Emanon, established in 1938. After going dormant, it reformed as a colony in 1979.)
**Chi**	March 16, 1944	University of Michigan	Ann Arbor, Michigan	Active	
**Psi**	December 15, 1945	University of Massachusetts Amherst	Amherst, Massachusetts	Active	(Note: Chapter formed by absorbing Sigma Iota, established in 1934.)
**Omega**	April 27, 1946 – 1977; 1984	Syracuse University	Syracuse, New York	Active	(Note: Chapter formed by absorbing Beta Chi Alpha, established in 1945. After going dormant, it reformed as a colony in 1983.)
**Alpha Beta**	January 25, 1947	University of Rhode Island	Kingston, Rhode Island	Active	(Note: Chapter formed by absorbing Nu Alpha, established in 1933.)
Alpha Delta	February 23, 1947 – 1971	University of Colorado Boulder	Boulder, Colorado	Inactive	(Note: Chapter formed by absorbing Lambda Phi, established in 1945.)
Alpha Epsilon	February 4, 1948 – 1953; 2000 - August 26, 2023	Purdue University	West Lafayette, Indiana	Inactive	(Note: Chapter formed by absorbing Delta Psi, established in 1946. After going dormant, it reformed by absorbing Alpha Upsilon, established in 1999.)
**Alpha Zeta**	January 15, 1950 – 2016; 2020	University of Pittsburgh	Pittsburgh, Pennsylvania	Active	(Note: Chapter formed by absorbing Delta Chi Rho, established in 1946.)
Alpha Eta	April 29, 1951 – 1973	Washington University	St. Louis, Missouri	Inactive	(Note: Chapter formed by absorbing Kappa Phi, established in 1941.)
**Alpha Theta**	March 22, 1952	University of Maryland, College Park	College Park, Maryland	Active	(Note: Chapter formed by absorbing Delta Phi, established in 1950.)
**Alpha Iota**	May 1, 1955	Tulane University	New Orleans, Louisiana	Active	
Alpha Kappa	February 3, 1957 – 1958	University of South Carolina	Columbia, South Carolina	Inactive	(Note: Chapter formed by absorbing Alpha Kappa, established in 1955.)
Alpha Lambda	September 7, 1957 – 1968	University of Missouri	Columbia, Missouri	Inactive	
**Alpha Mu**	October 26, 1957	University of Miami	Coral Gables, Florida	Active	
**Alpha Nu**	November 16, 1958 – 1971; 1982	University of Wisconsin–Madison	Madison, Wisconsin	Active	
**Alpha Xi**	1959–1962, 1986	Boston University	Boston, Massachusetts	Active	(Note: Chapter formed by absorbing Lambda Kappa, established in 1920.)
Alpha Omicron	May 3, 1959 – 1976; 19xx ?–2006	Brooklyn College	Brooklyn, New York	Inactive	(Note: Chapter formed by absorbing Delta Sigma Pi, established in 1931.)
Alpha Pi	December 6, 1959 – 1974; 1987–1998	University of Arizona	Tucson, Arizona	Inactive	
Alpha Rho	March 27, 1960 – 1970	New York University	New York, New York	Inactive	
Alpha Sigma	May 15, 1960 – 1973	Hunter College	New York, New York	Inactive	(Note: Chapter formed by absorbing Pi Alpha Tau, established in 1920.)
**Alpha Tau**	December 16, 1961 – 1971; 1985	George Washington University	Washington, D.C.	Active	
Alpha Upsilon	November 28, 1962 – 2024	Bradley University	Peoria, Illinois	Inactive	
Alpha Phi	June 3, 1962 – 1976	University of Memphis	Memphis, Tennessee	Inactive	(Note: Chapter formed by absorbing Theta Mu, established in 1950.)
Alpha Chi	May 5, 1963 – 1987	Miami University	Oxford, Ohio	Inactive	
Alpha Psi	November 10, 1963 – 1970	University of Akron	Akron, Ohio	Inactive	(Note: Chapter formed by absorbing Delta Pi Iota, established in 1934.)
Alpha Omega	November 10, 1964 – 1976	University of Toledo	Toledo, Ohio	Inactive	(Note: Chapter formed by absorbing Chi Lambda, established in 1962.)
Beta Alpha	January 31, 1965 – 1975; 1979–1984	University of Denver	Denver, Colorado	Inactive	
**Beta Beta**	November 1, 1964 – 1972; 1984	Michigan State University	East Lansing, Michigan	Active	
Beta Gamma	March 21, 1965 – 1971	University of Houston	Houston, Texas	Inactive	(Note: Chapter formed by absorbing Alpha Sigma Delta, established in 1950.)
Beta Delta	March 27, 1965 – 1969	Parsons College	Fairfield, Iowa	Inactive	
Beta Epsilon	November 3, 1966 – 1968	Colorado State University	Fort Collins, Colorado	Inactive	
**Beta Zeta**	March 7, 1967 –1971; 1986	Queens College	Flushing, Queens, New York	Active	(Note: Chapter formed by absorbing Colon (local), established in 1966.)
Beta Eta	May 12, 1967 – 1975	Northern Illinois University	DeKalb, Illinois	Inactive	(Note: Chapter formed by absorbing Sigma Rho, established in 1965.)
**Beta Theta**	November 12, 1967 – 1972; 2016	LIU Post	Brookville, New York	Active	(Note: Chapter formed by absorbing Phi Delta, established in 1956. After going dormant, it reformed as a colony in 2016.)
Beta Iota	February 23, 1969 – 1971	University of Missouri–Kansas City	Kansas City, Missouri	Inactive	
Beta Kappa	March 9, 1969 – 1971	Wayne State University	Detroit, Michigan	Inactive	
Beta Lambda	April 25, 1969 – 1970	West Chester University	West Chester, Pennsylvania	Inactive	
Beta Nu	November 16, 1975 – 1983	University of Florida	Gainesville, Florida	Inactive	
**Beta Xi**	November 20, 1977	Union College	Schenectady, New York	Active	
**Beta Pi**	April 1, 1978	University of Rochester	Rochester, New York	Active	
Beta Rho	May 3, 1981 – 1988; 2011–2018	University of Virginia	Charlottesville, Virginia	Inactive	
Beta Sigma	November 13, 1968 – 1973	Lehman College	Bronx, New York	Inactive	(Note: charter granted out of order, after Beta Theta)
**Beta Tau**	September 13, 1981	Rutgers University–New Brunswick	New Brunswick, New Jersey	Active	
Beta Upsilon	May 15, 1983 – xxxx ?	Stanford University	Stanford, California	Inactive	
**Beta Phi**	December 1, 1984	Stony Brook University	Stony Brook, New York	Active	
Beta Chi	May 5, 1985 – 2013; 2016–2020	University of Kansas	Lawrence, Kansas	Inactive	
**Gamma Alpha**	April 21, 1985	State University of New York at Binghamton	Binghamton, New York	Active	
Gamma Beta	November 15, 1985 – 2017	University at Albany	Albany, New York	Inactive	
Gamma Gamma	November 28, 1986 – 2020	Hofstra University	Hempstead, New York	Inactive	
**Gamma Delta**	December 12, 1987	American University	Washington, D.C.	Active	
**Gamma Epsilon**	December 5, 1987	State University of New York at Oneonta	Oneonta, New York	Active	
**Gamma Zeta**	April 16, 1988	Buffalo State University	Buffalo, New York	Active	
**Gamma Eta**	April 17, 1988	University of South Florida	Tampa, Florida	Active	
**Gamma Theta**	November 5, 1988	State University of New York at Cortland	Cortland, New York	Active	
**Gamma Iota**	April 9, 1989	University of Hartford	West Hartford, Connecticut	Active	
**Gamma Kappa**	March 14, 1989	State University of New York at Oswego	Oswego, New York	Active	
**Gamma Lambda**	April 15, 1989 – 199x ?; 2007	Florida State University	Tallahassee, Florida	Active	
**Gamma Mu**	February 10, 1990	Northeastern University	Boston, Massachusetts	Active	
**Gamma Nu**	April 30, 1989	State University of New York at New Paltz	New Paltz, New York	Active	
**Gamma Xi**	January 26, 1990	Montclair State University	Montclair, New Jersey	Active	(Note: Chapter formed by absorbing Delta Tau, established in 1989.)
Gamma Omicron	November 11, 1990 – 1998	York University	Toronto, Ontario, Canada	Inactive	
**Gamma Pi**	March 9, 1991	University of Tampa	Tampa, Florida	Active	
**Gamma Rho**	1991	Ramapo College	Mahwah, New Jersey	Active	
**Gamma Sigma**	April 28, 1991	Johnson & Wales University	Providence, Rhode Island	Active	
**Gamma Tau**	January 19, 1992	Columbia University	New York, New York	Active	
**Gamma Upsilon**	October 5, 1991	State University of New York at Plattsburgh	Plattsburgh, New York	Active	
**Gamma Phi**	October 12, 1991	York College of Pennsylvania	Spring Garden Township, Pennsylvania	Active	
**Gamma Chi**	January 25, 1992	State University of New York at Geneseo	Geneseo, New York	Active	
Gamma Psi	March 7, 1992 – xxxx ?	Arizona State University	Tempe, Arizona	Inactive	
**Gamma Omega**	April 26, 1992	Adelphi University	Garden City, New York	Active	(Note: Chapter formed by absorbing Iota Beta Nu, established in 1989.)
**Delta Alpha**	May 31, 1992	Eastern Michigan University	Ypsilanti, Michigan	Active	(Note: Chapter formed by absorbing Chi Phi Kappa, established in 1990.)
Delta Beta	October 9, 1993 – xxxx ?	Illinois State University	Normal, Illinois	Inactive	
**Delta Gamma**	April 30, 1995	Brandeis University	Waltham, Massachusetts	Active	(Note: Brandeis does not recognize Greek Letter Organizations, chapter is now affiliated with the city)
Delta Delta	November 10, 1996 – 2013	College of Staten Island	Staten Island, New York	Inactive	(Note: Chapter formed by absorbing Delta Sigma Tau.)
**Delta Epsilon**	March 31, 2001	Emory University	Atlanta, Georgia	Active	
**Delta Zeta**	December 8, 2002	Rutgers University–Camden	Camden, New Jersey	Active	
Delta Eta	December 7, 2003 – 2021	College of Charleston	Charleston, South Carolina	Inactive	
**Delta Theta**	November 17, 2006	Pace University	New York, New York	Active	
**Delta Iota**	November 12, 2006	Nova Southeastern University	Fort Lauderdale-Davie, Florida	Active	
**Delta Kappa**	March 25, 2012	Western Connecticut State University	Danbury, Connecticut	Active	
**Delta Lambda**	February 2, 2013	Farmingdale State College	East Farmingdale, New York	Active	
**Delta Mu**	November 17, 2013	Manhattan College	Riverdale, Bronx, New York	Active	
**Delta Nu**	January 21, 2015	Stevens Institute of Technology	Hoboken, New Jersey	Active	
**Delta Xi**	May 2, 2015	Rowan University	Glassboro, New Jersey	Active	
**Delta Omicron**	January 29, 2017	Kent State University	Kent, Ohio	Active	
**Delta Pi**	April 13, 2019	Stockton University	Galloway Township, New Jersey	Active	
**Delta Rho**	November 20, 2022	Florida Atlantic University	Boca Raton, Florida	Active	
