= Knechtel =

Knechtel is a surname. Notable people with the surname include:

- Larry Knechtel (1940–2009), American keyboards and bassist session musician
- Wilhelm Knechtel (1837–1924), German gardener and botanist

== See also ==
- Knechtle
