= Knechtle =

Knechtle is a surname. Notable people with the surname include:

- Cliffe Knechtle (born 1954), American Protestant pastor and apologist
- Stuart Knechtle (born 1988), American Protestant assistant pastor and apologist

== See also ==
- Knechtel
