= Nicolet High School =

Location
- 6701 North Jean Nicolet Road; Glendale, Wisconsin 53217; United States
- Coordinates: 43.13944°N 87.91687°W

Information
- Other name: Nicolet Union High School
- Type: Public
- Established: 1955
- School district: Nicolet Unified School District
- NCES District ID: 5505490
- NCES School ID: 550549000584
- Principal: Joe Patek
- Teaching staff: 82.31 (on an FTE basis)
- Grades: 9–12
- Enrollment: 1,043 (2024–25)
- Student to teacher ratio: 12.67
- Colors: Blue and white
- Athletics conference: North Shore Conference
- Nickname: Knights
- Rival: Homestead
- Website: https://www.nicolet.k12.wi.us/

Nicolet High School is a public secondary school located in Glendale, Wisconsin. It is the only school in the Nicolet Unified School District, which serves Glendale, Fox Point, Bayside, and River Hills. Primary schooling is administered by three feeder districts. The Nicolet Unified School district is one of the few school districts in Wisconsin to be made up of only one school. Its main feeder schools are Glen Hills Middle School, Maple Dale Middle School, and Bayside Middle School. A private school which sends students to Nicolet High is Milwaukee Jewish Day School.

== Academics ==
The school offers French, German, Hebrew, and Spanish languages.

Nicolet High School has an advanced placement program that includes calculus (AB and BC), statistics, computer science, physics (B, C: mechanics, and C: electromagnetism), chemistry, biology, environmental science, English language and composition, French language, Spanish language, Spanish literature, German language, music theory, American history, European history, macro-economics, micro-economics, studio art (drawing, 2D, 3D), and American government.

Nicolet offers Microsoft Certification. Students earn college credit for each application they become certified in. Certification are available in 365, Access, Excel, SharePoint, Word and more.

Nicolet High School was listed as one of the 50 best schools in Wisconsin by U.S. News & World Report in 2008.

== Athletics ==
- Fall Boys
  - Football
  - Cross Country
  - Soccer
  - Volleyball
- Fall Girls
  - Tennis
  - Cross Country
  - Golf
  - Volleyball
  - Swimming and Diving
  - Cheerleading
- Winter Boys
  - Basketball
  - Hockey
  - Skiing
  - Swimming and Diving
  - Wrestling
- Winter Girls
  - Basketball
  - Hockey
  - Skiing
  - Gymnastics
  - Cheerleading
  - Wrestling
- Spring Boys
  - Track
  - Tennis
  - Golf
  - Lacrosse
  - Baseball
- Spring Girls
  - Track
  - Softball
  - Soccer
  - Lacrosse

=== Conference affiliation history ===
- Braveland Conference (1956-1985)
- North Shore Conference (1985–present)

== Notable alumni ==
- Michael Angeli – journalist, screenwriter
- Andrew Armacost – Brigadier General USAF Academy
- Monte Davidoff – co-creator of Microsoft's first product, Altair BASIC
- Randee Drew – professional football player for the CFL Montreal Alouettes
- David Einhorn – hedge fund manager, founder and president of Greenlight Capital
- Howie Epstein – musician, Tom Petty and the Heartbreakers
- Hal Erickson – media historian, author
- David Evans – professor of geology and geophysics at Yale University
- James Goldstein – "NBA Superfan"
- Dan Grunfeld – professional basketball player
- Justin Hurwitz – Oscar and Grammy award-winning composer and writer
- Jalen Johnson – small forward for the Atlanta Hawks
- Kobe Johnson - basketball player
- Kato Kaelin – actor and key witness in O.J. Simpson murder trial
- Phil Katz – creator of PKZIP compression software
- Skip Kendall – professional golfer
- Michael Konik – author, television personality
- Mark Leno – American politician and first openly gay man to serve on the California State Senate
- AzMarie Livingston – fashion model
- Bari Lurie – politician
- Brian Lynch – Grammy Award-winning jazz musician
- Thomas L. Miller - film and television producer, co-founder of Miller-Boyett Productions
- Lance Painter – professional baseball pitcher
- Rick Perlstein – author and historian
- Jack Rieley – record producer, manager of The Beach Boys
- Sonya Robinson – musician and songwriter, 1983 Miss Black America
- Terilyn A. Shropshire – motion picture and television editor
- Tierney Sutton – jazz singer and five-time Grammy Award nominee
- Charlie Sykes – reporter at The Milwaukee Journal and talk radio host at WTMJ (AM)
- B.J. Tucker – professional football player for the San Francisco 49ers
- Joah Tucker – professional basketball player
- Mary Lou E. Van Dreel – Wisconsin State Representative
- Garrett Weber-Gale – Olympic two-time Olympic gold medalist, world record-holder in two events
- Oprah Winfrey – talk show host (attended her sophomore year; did not graduate)
