= Xela =

Xela may refer to:

== Biology ==
- Neoxela, a genus of longhorn beetles in the tribe Xystrocerini, first described under the name Xela
- Cepa (fly), a genus of hoverfly in the tribe Merodontini, first described under the name Xela
- Xela (trilobite), a fossil genus of trilobite

== Other uses ==
- Exela Technologies, American corporation (NASDAQ stock symbol XELA)
- Quetzaltenango, a Guatemalan city which is more commonly referred to as Xela
- Xela, the signature that American artist Alex Schomburg used for his airbrushed covers for comic books
- Xela (musician), an electronic-music artist
- XELA-AM (1941–2002), a Mexican classical music radio station
