= Exela Technologies =

American company

Exela Technologies Inc.
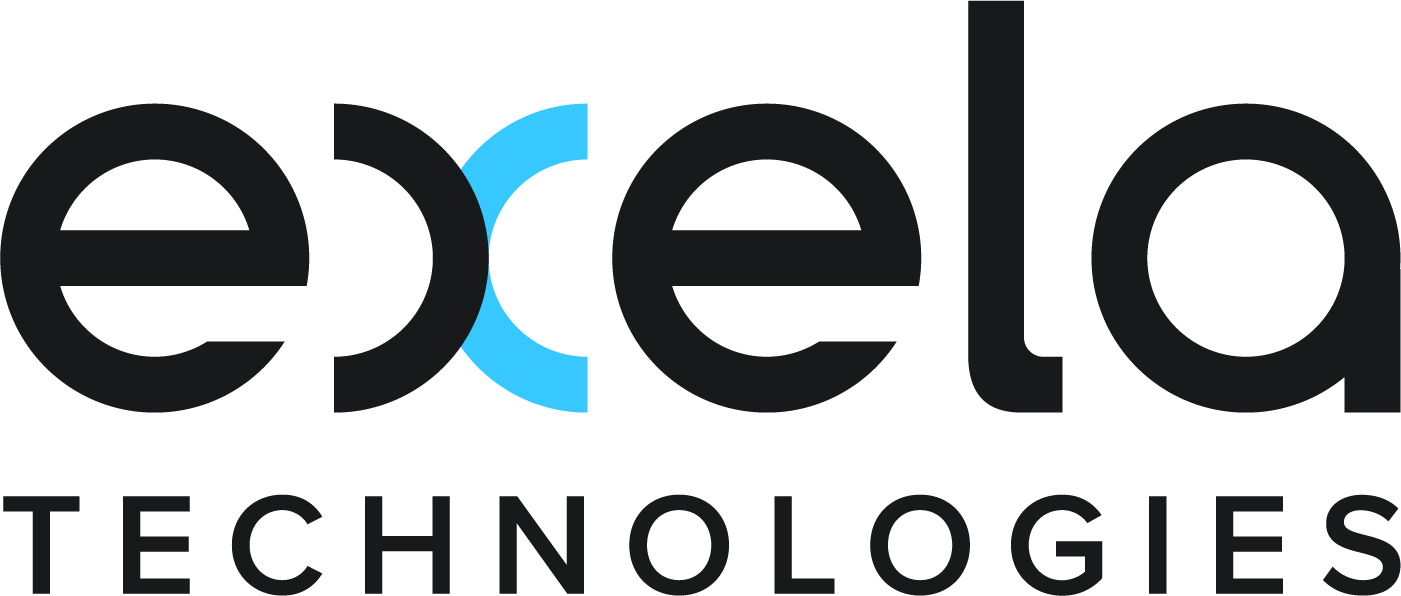
- Company type: Public
- Traded as: Nasdaq: XELA; Russell 2000 Component
- Industry: Software, information technology
- Predecessor: SourceHOV LLC, Novitex Holdings, Inc. and Quinpario Acquisition Corp. 2
- Founded: 2017
- Headquarters: Irwing, Texas, Irving, Texas, United States
- Key people: Suresh Yannamani (Chief Executive Officer of Exela Technologies BPA LLC)
- Products: PCH Global, XBP, TTY
- Services: enterprise information management, transaction processing services, business process automation
- Revenue: ▲$1,292.6 Million (2020)
- Number of employees: 16,000
- Website: www.exelatech.com

Exela Technologies, Inc. is an American business process automation ("BPA") company. It was created with the merger of SourceHOV LCC, Novitex Holdings, Inc. and Quinpario Acquisition Corp. 2.

== Overview ==
Exela’s software and services address finance & accounting, human capital management, and legal management, as well as banking, healthcare, insurance, and public sectors.

Exela Technology services include Artificial Intelligence (AI) enabled workflow automation, digital mail rooms, attended and un-attended cognitive automation, print communications, and payment processing.

In 2024, Exela announced a strategic partnership with Aidéo Technologies, a provider to the revenue cycle management (RCM) industry.

In 2024 the company declared serving 4,000+ customers in more than 50 countries. It has 1,100 onsite client facilities and 150 "delivery centers" in the Americas, Europe and Asia.

In October 2022, Exela Technologies was listed as a Leader in the Everest Group – PEAK Matrix for Medical Coding Operations Assessment 2022". In July 2019, Exela Technologies added Martin Akins to their board of directors.

In July 2019, Exela Technologies added Martin Akins to their board of directors.

In March 2020, Exela completed the divestment of SourceHOV Tax, the company's tax consulting group, for $40 million to private equity firm Gainline Capital Partners. Greenlight Capital is one of the top investors in Exela Technologies.

As per the latest financial results published in August 2023, the number of employees stood at approximately 16,500.
