= Sohn Conference Foundation =

American medical research charity

- Named after: Ira Sohn
- Predecessor: Ira Sohn Research Conference
- Formation: 2006; 20 years ago
- Founders: Douglas Hirsch; Lance Laifer; Daniel Nir; Judith Sohn; Evan Sohn
- Founded at: New York
- Type: NGO
- Legal status: Foundation
- Headquarters: 635 Madison Avenue; Suite 1402; New York, NY 10022
- Location: New York
- Key people: Dan Nir (Co-Founder & President); Doug Hirsch (Co-Founder & Chairman Emeritus); Evan Sohn (Co-Founder, Vice President and Treasurer); Graham Duncan (CEO & Chairman); Isa Shreeve (Managing Director)
- Website: www.sohnconference.org

The Sohn Conference Foundation was founded in 2006 to raise money to support medical research, the development of research equipment, and programs to help children with cancer and other childhood illnesses. As of 2018 more than $85 million has been raised. The Sohn Conference was founded in 1995 in memory of Ira Sohn, a Wall Street professional, who died of cancer at the age of 29. At that time the conference raised money for Tomorrow's Children's Fund. The foundation has 501(c)(3) non-profit status.

== Conference history ==
Launched in 1995 as the Ira Sohn Research Conference, it is now called the Sohn Investment Conference. It was created after the premature death from cancer of Ira W. Sohn, by his friends and colleagues Douglas Hirsch, Lance Laifer and Daniel Nir, together with Sohn's mother Judith Sohn and brother Evan.

In May 2016, the foundation and CNBC announced a partnership to present the Sohn Investment Conferences in collaboration. The first conference presented as a partnership took place in New York City on May 4, 2016.

== Key people ==
- Dan Nir – Co-founder & President, Sohn Conference Foundation
- Doug Hirsch – Co-founder & Chairman Emeritus, Sohn Conference Foundation
- Evan Sohn – Co-founder, Vice President and Treasurer
- Graham Duncan – CEO & Chairman

== Sohn Investment Conference ==
Each year the conference brings together about 3,000 investors and hedge fund managers who present their views and ideas about investing. According to the Wall Street Journal, the Sohn Investment Conference “is the Superbowl of investing conferences.” The conference can be a showcase for some historic messages, the most prominent being when David Einhorn predicted the failure of Lehman Brothers. Next Wave Sohn was launched in May 2014. It showcases the next generation of hedge fund managers whose resumes and past performances predict that they will become Wall Street's future stars. Next Wave Sohn is held in the morning before the main conference event. It is in the same format and spirit as the main conference, but for emerging funds instead.

== Past investment speakers ==
- William Ackman
- Stanley Druckenmiller
- David Einhorn
- Niall Ferguson
- Jeffrey Gundlach
- Carl Icahn
- Paul Tudor Jones
- Seth Klarman
- Howard Marks
- Larry Robbins
- Paul Singer
- David Tepper
- Sam Zell

== Past Honorees ==
- Trevor Reilly
- Magnus Carlsen
- Eli Manning
- Marc Messier
- Pat LaFontaine
- Oz Pearlman
- Elena Simon
- Cindy Campbell
- Sandy Simon
- Marc Tessier Levigne
- Ken Langone

== Investment Idea Contest ==
Students and professional investors are invited each year to submit an investment idea with a 12-month time horizon ahead of the annual Sohn Investment Conference in New York. The contest is judged by five major fund managers such as Bill Ackman and David Einhorn. The winner is given the opportunity to present the idea at the conference during a ten-minute pitch. Past winners include:

2011: Sunjay Gorawara- Indiana University undergraduate student.

2012: Shantanu Agrawal- Pacific Investment Management Co vice president.

2016: Marc Grow- Columbia Business School student

2017: Dylan Adelman- Wharton School of Business student

2018: Andrew Walker- Rangeley Capital Head of Research

Four finalists are awarded two tickets to the conference and access to the GLG network. Eight semi-finalists are also picked and given two tickets to the conference.

== Sohn Scientific Conference ==
In March/April 2016 the foundation held its first international scientific conference in collaboration with the New York Academy of Sciences to sponsor “Sohn Conference: Pediatric Cancer in a Post-Genomic World.”

== Pediatric cancer research and care ==
The foundation takes an investor's approach to choosing strategies to fight pediatric cancer. Focused on the New York metropolitan area, the foundation encourages collaboration among the area's well-known research institutes. Among its goals are to support a new generation of cancer researchers; to support access to the most current technologies for treating cancer; and to improve the quality of life for children who are living with cancer.

== Pershing Square Sohn Cancer Research Alliance ==
In 2014, the Pershing Square Sohn Prize for Young Investigators in Cancer Research was launched by the Pershing Square Sohn Cancer Research Alliance. The award is bequeathed yearly to the most promising young scientists in New York City's medical research institutions and universities.

== Strategic partners ==
The foundation gives grants to the following institutions:

- Columbia University Medical Center
- Damon Runyon Cancer Research Foundation
- The New York Genome Center
- Hackensack University Medical Center
- Memorial Sloan Kettering Cancer Center
- NYU Langone Medical Center
- New York-Presbyterian Hospital/Weill Cornell Medical Center
- Pershing Square Foundation
- The Rockefeller University
- Tri-Institutional Therapeutics Discovery Institute

== International expansion ==
The foundation has partnered and seeded conferences across the globe, including Australia, Canada, Hong Kong, India, London, New York City, San Francisco, Tel Aviv, Monaco and Zurich.
