= Dan Grunfeld =

American-Israeli basketball player (born 1984)

Dan Grunfeld דן גרונפלד
Personal information
- Born: February 7, 1984 (age 42) Franklin Lakes, New Jersey
- Listed height: 1.98 m (6 ft 6 in)
- Listed weight: 83 kg (183 lb)

Career information
- High school: Nicolet (Glendale, Wisconsin)
- College: Stanford (2002–2006)
- NBA draft: 2006: undrafted
- Playing career: 2006–present
- Position: Small forward / shooting guard
- Number: 21

Career history
- 2006–2007: EWE Baskets Oldenburg
- 2007–2008: Aguas de Valencia Gandía Bàsquet
- 2008–2010: CB Valladolid
- 2010–2011: Bnei Hasharon
- 2011: Hapoel Holon
- 2011–2013: Hapoel Jerusalem
- 2013–2014: Bnei Herzliya

Career highlights
- First-team All-Pac-10 (2005)
Medals
Representing United States
Basketball
Maccabiah Games
Gold medal – first place	2009 Maccabiah	Basketball

Daniel Leslie Grunfeld (Hebrew: דן גרונפלד; born February 7, 1984) is an American-Israeli professional basketball player, who last played as a small forward for Bnei Herzliya in the Israeli Basketball Premier League. He played briefly for Hapoel Holon, but left the team due to its financial problems, and signed a two-year contract with Hapoel Jerusalem starting at the beginning of November 2011.

He is the son of former New York Knicks guard, and former Washington Wizards executive, Ernie Grunfeld. In high school, he averaged 23.9 points per game and was the MVP of his conference. In college, at Stanford University, he was first team All Pacific-10 Conference as a junior. He has also played professionally for EWE Baskets Oldenburg, Aguas de Valencia Gandía Bàsquet, CB Valladolid, and Bnei Hasharon.

== Early life ==
Grunfeld is Jewish. His grandmother is a Holocaust survivor whose life was saved twice by Swedish diplomat Raoul Wallenberg―once as a beneficiary of the false citizenship documents that Wallenberg issued to Jews in Hungary, and later when he convinced Nazi guards not to gun down the 80,000 Jews left in the Budapest Ghetto at the end of World War II.

"My grandma was hiding in a burnt-out building, crammed into a small attic space with her fellow prisoners. She was 17. Her parents and five of her siblings never came home," he writes.

== Basketball career ==
=== High school ===
Grunfeld grew up in Franklin Lakes, New Jersey, while his father was the GM of the New York Knicks. Due to this, Grunfeld grew up a die-hard Knicks fan, but was just an average player on his middle school team during the late 1990s. When his father became the Milwaukee Bucks GM, Grunfeld moved to Wisconsin. It was there that he developed his game and shot up in height.

In high school, he averaged 23.9 points, 7.1 rebounds and 2.0 assists per game during his senior season at Nicolet High School. He shot 61% from the floor. That season, he was conference MVP, all-league first team, first team all-area (Milwaukee Journal-Sentinel), first team all-state (Associated Press), CNI Suburban Player of the Year, and WCBA first team all-state. He was also named by The Sporting News as the Best Shooter, out of more than 3,000 players.

=== College ===
Grunfeld went on to play at Stanford University, where he had a successful college career. While playing for the Stanford Cardinal and leading the team in scoring (17.0 ppg; # 5 in the Pac-10), in February 2005 he tore his right knee anterior cruciate ligament (ACL), forcing him to sit out the team's final nine games. He took the time on the sidelines to "observe what certain people do to be successful," and improve his basketball awareness. As a junior in 2004–05, he was named first team All-Pacific-10 Conference, to the National Association of Basketball Coaches (NABC) District-14 first team, and to the 2005 ESPN The Magazine Academic All-American University Division Second Team, to the District-8 ESPN The Magazine University Division All-Academic First Team, and to the Pac-10 Academic first team. In his senior year in 2005–06, he was a first-team Pac-10 All-Academic selection, and a first-team ESPN The Magazine Academic All-American selection.

=== Professional career ===
After going undrafted out of Stanford in 2006, he played his first two professional seasons with the EWE Baskets Oldenburg in the German Basketball Bundesliga, then with Aguas de Valencia Gandía in Spain's LEB Oro League. In September 2008, his childhood dream came true when the New York Knicks signed him to the team under undisclosed terms. On October 23, 2008, Grunfeld was waived by the team.

In January 2009 he received Romanian citizenship in order to be eligible for playing for the Romania national basketball team.

He played for Bnei Hasharon in the Israeli Basketball Super League in 2010–11, averaging 14.1 points per game on 56.9% shooting. In 2010, he made aliyah, becoming an Israeli citizen. In July 2011, he signed a two-year deal with Israel's Hapoel Holon. Due to the team's financial problems at the beginning of the 2011 season, he was released and signed a two-year contract with Hapoel Jerusalem. He is one of a number of American Jews who played in Israel, including Jon Scheyer, Sylven Landesberg, Glenn Consor, and David Blu.

== Maccabiah Games ==
Grunfeld played in the Maccabiah Games for the United States, in 2009. He led the U.S. to a gold medal, with 25 points and 12 rebounds in the final overtime game against Israel.

== Post-Basketball Life ==
After retiring from basketball, Grunfeld received an MBA degree from Stanford University and began a career as a technology executive in Silicon Valley. He also comments on social issues and politics. In October of 2026 Grunfield was named the general manager of Stanford men's basketball.
