= David Einhorn (hedge fund manager) =

American investor and hedge fund manager (born 1968)

- Born: November 20, 1968 (age 57)
- Education: Cornell University
- Occupations: Investor, hedge fund manager
- Known for: Founding and leading Greenlight Capital
- Spouse: Cheryl Strauss (m. 1993; div. 2017)
- Children: 3

David M. Einhorn (born November 20, 1968) is an American venture capitalist and hedge fund manager. He is the founder and president of the hedge fund Greenlight Capital.

Einhorn began Greenlight Capital in 1996. Over the next decade, the fund experienced annualized returns of 26%, far better than the market. Greenlight Capital's assets under management decreased from approximately US$12 billion in 2014 to about $5.5 billion as reported in July 2018 as the fund was down 11.3% from 2014 through the end of 2017, and a further 34% in 2018. He has received extensive coverage in the financial press for his fund's performance, his investing strategy and his positions.

Einhorn was included in Time magazine's Time 100 list of "100 most influential people in the world" in 2013. According to Investopedia, his net worth was around US$1.5 billion in June 2019.

== Early life and education ==
Einhorn was born to a Jewish family in New Jersey, the son of Stephen and Nancy Einhorn. Raised in Demarest, New Jersey, at seven he and his family moved to Wisconsin. His father is the founder and president of Einhorn & Associates, a consulting firm, and Capital Midwest Fund, a venture capital fund. He has one brother Daniel who works with his father. In 1987, Einhorn graduated from Nicolet High School in Glendale, Wisconsin. Einhorn graduated summa cum laude from Cornell University with a B.A. in government from the College of Arts and Sciences in 1991. He was a member of the Sigma Alpha Epsilon fraternity at Cornell.

== Investment career ==
Einhorn started Greenlight Capital in May 1996 with $900,000 in start up capital. In May 2002, he gave a speech at the Sohn Investment Research Conference where he recommended shorting a mid-cap financial company called Allied Capital eventually disclosing that he himself had a substantial short position. The day after the speech the company's stock went down by 20 percent. Einhorn accused the company of defrauding the Small Business Administration while Allied said that Einhorn was engaging in market manipulation, and illegally accessed his phone records using pretexting. In June 2007, after a lengthy investigation by the U.S. Securities and Exchange Commission (SEC), it found that Allied broke securities laws relating to the accounting and valuation of illiquid securities it held. After the incident, Einhorn published a book, Fooling Some of the People All of the Time regarding this six-year fight. Reviews of the book were generally positive; Seeking Alpha, said of the book: "the case against Allied Capital is laid out to the last detail. Because of the immense amount of data in the book, I would imagine that some readers may want to skip a page here and there. However, the book is by no means dull. This book proves that truth is really stranger than fiction." Einhorn would come to view Allied as a microcosm of market trends: "What we've seen a year later is that Allied was the tip of an iceberg; that this kind of questionable ethic, philosophy and business practice was far more widespread than I recognized at the time ... Our country, our economy, is paying a huge price for that."

=== Lehman Brothers ===
In July 2007, Einhorn shorted Lehman Brothers stock, believing that Lehman had massive exposures to illiquid real estate investments that were improperly accounted for. He also claimed that they used dubious accounting practices in their financial filings. Einhorn shared his thesis on Lehman in November 2007 at the Value Investing Congress.

When Bear Stearns had to be bailed out by the Federal Reserve in March 2008, Lehman was widely considered to be in a weak financial situation. In a speech at a conference in April, Einhorn announced his Lehman short position. In May, Lehman's CFO Erin Callan held a private teleconference with Einhorn and his staff, who hoped Callan could explain discrepancies they had uncovered since the firm's latest financial filing. Einhorn publicly characterized Callan's responses on the call in a negative light and Lehman stock fell sharply. Callan was fired a few weeks later when Lehman reported a $2.8 billion quarterly loss. Lehman would declare bankruptcy in September 2008.

=== Microsoft ===
On May 26, 2011, Einhorn called for Steve Ballmer, CEO of Microsoft, to step down after Microsoft had been passed by both Google and Apple in market value.

=== U.K. insider dealing ===
In January 2012, the U.K. Financial Services Authority (FSA) fined Einhorn and Greenlight Capital $11.2 million for trading on inside information. The FSA claimed Einhorn obtained information on the Punch Taverns Plc (PUB) equity fundraising by a broker representing the company prior to public knowledge of the event. Over the following four days, Einhorn sold more than 11 million shares, avoiding a 29.9% stock price collapse and subsequent loss of about £5.8 million.

The Financial Services Authority stated:

The FSA accepted that Einhorn's trading was not deliberate because he did not believe that it was inside information. However, this was not a reasonable belief. This was a serious case of market abuse by Einhorn and fell below the standards the FSA expects, particularly due to Einhorn's prominent position as President of Greenlight and given his experience in the market. Einhorn is an experienced professional with a high profile in the industry. We expect someone in his position to be able to identify inside information when he receives it and to act appropriately. His failure to do so is a serious breach of the expected standards of market conduct. It is highly damaging to market confidence when privileged shareholders commit market abuse, and the high penalty reflects the seriousness of his breach.

Einhorn called the £7.2m fine "unjust" and "inconsistent with the law" but said he would pay it "rather than continue an arduous fight" The fine was the second largest levied on an individual in the history of Britain's Financial Services Authority.

=== Green Mountain Coffee Roasters ===
Speaking at the Value Investing Congress in New York City on October 17, 2011, Einhorn publicly announced his short position in Green Mountain Coffee Roasters stock. Prior to that date, the company's share price had increased more than tenfold since March 2009, the third-biggest gain in the Standard & Poor's Midcap 400 Index. In his presentation Einhorn opined that the market for Green Mountain's new Keurig single-cup coffee brewer was "limited", and that the K-Cup coffee pods for the machine presented a "looming patent issue" for the company. He also said that Green Mountain had a "litany of accounting questions". Following Einhorn's speech Green Mountain's share price fell by 10 percent, closing that day at $82.50.

A few weeks later on November 9, 2011, Green Mountain's quarterly report missed analyst expectations and its stock price plunged to $43.71. The company's CEO Lawrence J. Blanford cited a "number of factors including changes in wholesale customer ordering patterns in our grocery and club channels" for the underperformance of the company. The stock had a run up to 157 in Nov 2014, before its final pricing in the 90's, prior to the company being sold.

=== Apple Inc. ===
In early February 2013 Einhorn filed a lawsuit against Apple Inc. in a Manhattan court in order to pressure the company to issue dividend-paying perpetual preferred stock as a means of distributing some of its $137 billion in cash to shareholders. Later that month Einhorn set what one Wall Street Journal headline called a "Legal Precedent in Corporate Governance" when the court ruled in favor of Einhorn and determined that Apple's attempt to bundle a measure requiring a shareholder vote prior to issuing preferred shares with a larger shareholder proposal "impermissibly bundles 'separate matters' for shareholder consideration".

=== Fracking industry ===
Speaking at the Sohn Investment Conference on May 4, 2015, Einhorn sharply criticized unprofitable oil and gas companies. He said, "A business that burns cash and doesn't grow isn't worth anything." Specifically, Einhorn announced short positions on Pioneer Natural Resources and Concho Resources. Einhorn also joked that Pioneer Natural Resources is a "Motherfracker," referencing hydraulic fracturing or "fracking" that is a common means of stimulating production from oil- and gas-bearing rock.

== Personal life ==
In 1993, Einhorn married Cheryl Strauss, a financial reporter and media consultant; they divorced in 2017. He has three children with Strauss. Einhorn lives in Westchester County, New York.

David Einhorn is a Democrat, and has contributed to Democratic political campaigns, in contrast to his parents, who are Republican donors. In 2012, Einhorn co-hosted a fundraiser for the Keeping America Competitive PAC, led by moderate Republican Leonard M. Tannenbaum.

He is reported to drive a Honda Odyssey.

He is also a founding Master Player of the Portfolios with Purpose virtual stock trading contest.

== Wealth and philanthropy ==
As of March 2019, Forbes magazine reported Einhorn to have an overall net worth of US$700 million.

Einhorn is a major contributor and board member of the Michael J. Fox Foundation. He donated his 2006 poker winnings (over $650,000) to the foundation. He is also on the board of the Robin Hood Foundation and a contributor to numerous charities in the New York area. In the spring of 2009, as promised in his book Fooling Some of the People All of the Time, Greenlight Capital donated all of the general partner's profits from the shorting of Allied Capital stock (an additional $6 million - Greenlight already donated $1 million in 2005 to Tomorrows Children's Fund - to make a total of $7 million) to three organizations (Tomorrows Children's Fund, The Project On Government Oversight (POGO) and the Center for Public Integrity (CPI)).

=== New York Mets ===
On May 26, 2011, the New York Mets announced that Einhorn had agreed to buy a minority share of the baseball team for $200 million. Einhorn had the option to purchase a majority stake in the Mets after three years if current majority owner Fred Wilpon and his family could not meet their financial obligations by then. On September 1, 2011, the Mets announced that they had ended negotiations to sell minority ownership to Einhorn.

=== Poker ===
In 2006, Einhorn finished 18th in the 2006 World Series of Poker Main Event which accounted for $659,730.

In 2012, Einhorn donated his winnings from the 2012 World Series of Poker Big One for One Drop Tournament (which had a one million dollar buy in, and in which he won $4,352,000 for his 3rd-place finish) to City Year.

In 2019, Einhorn final tabled the $50,000 No Limit Hold'em High Roller (Event #5), also this at the World Series of Poker, when he finished 9th for $122,551.

In 2026, Einhorn placed 3rd in the WSOP $250,000 Super High Roller No Limit Hold'em Tournament, winning $1,862,941.

As of 2026, Einhorn's live tournament winnings count for 24th in the New York-area and 185th overall in the US (both all-time rankings).

== Court case with an ex-employee ==
Former Greenlight Capital employee James Fishback sued Greenlight over his job title in October 2023. In the suit, Fishback claimed that in the two-and-a-half years he worked at Greenlight Capital, he was promoted twice; first from research analyst to trader and then to "head of macro," a position the firm claims never existed.

In September 2025, the dispute was resolved when Fishback admitted to sharing confidential information and acknowledged violating his employment terms by emailing Greenlight’s positions and strategies to a personal account and maintaining an undisclosed trading account. As part of the settlement, he agreed to return or delete all Greenlight information in his possession and pay the firm’s legal fees and costs.

Notable media covered the controversy and the lawsuit that ensued.

== Bibliography ==
- Einhorn, David (2010). Fooling Some of the People All of the Time. Wiley Publishing.
