= James Fishback =

American investor and politician (born 1995)

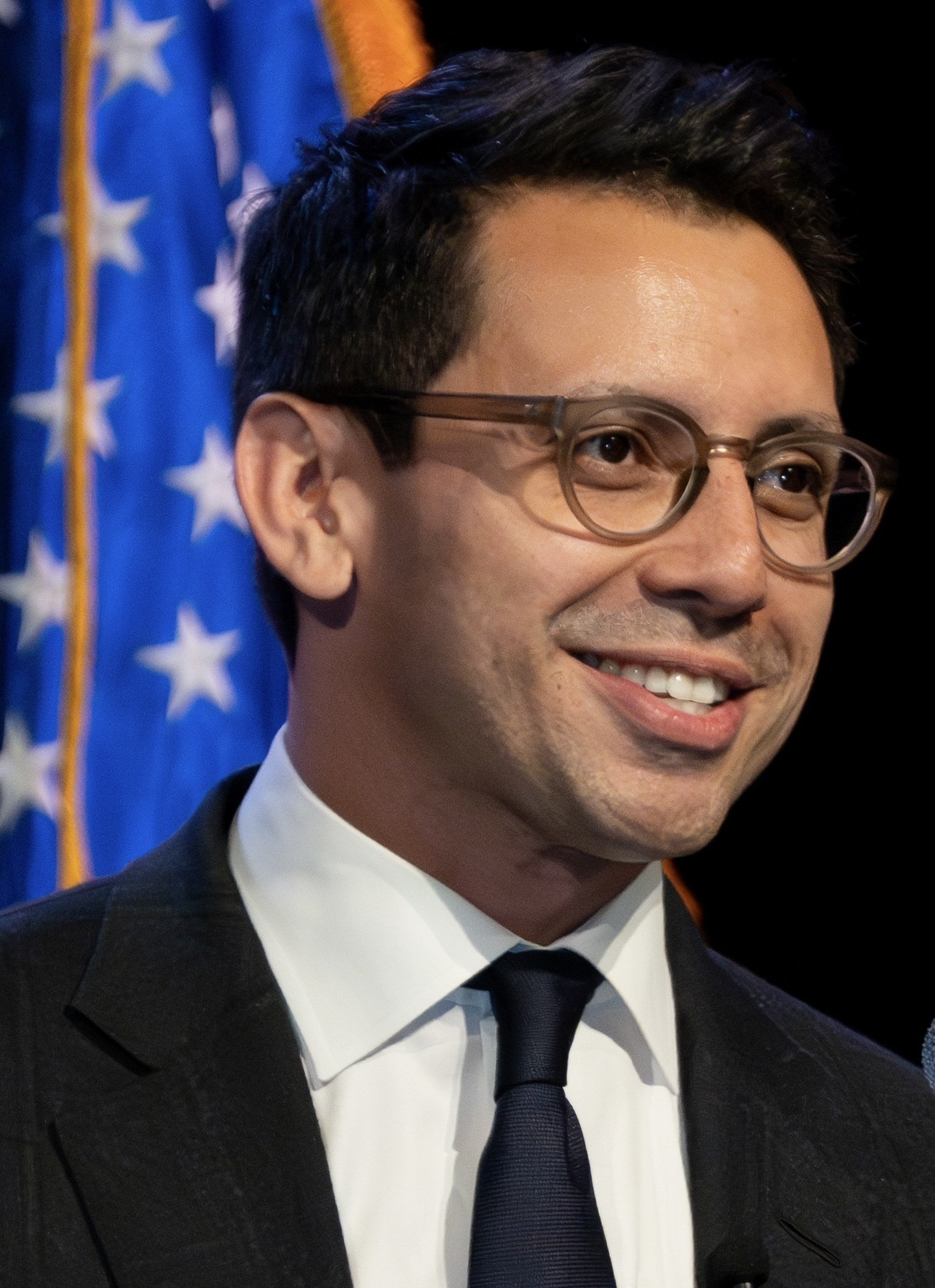
- Fishback speaking at Ave Maria University, 2026
- Born: James Thomas Fishback; January 1, 1995 (age 31); Davie, Florida, U.S.
- Education: Georgetown University (dropped out)
- Occupations: Political activist; businessman
- Political party: Republican
- Spouse: Valeria Quimby-Moro (m. 2026)
- Website: Campaign website

James Fishback (born January 1, 1995) is an American investor and politician. He unsuccessfully ran for the Republican nomination in the 2026 Florida gubernatorial election. During his campaign, Fishback drew national media attention for far-right rhetoric, which was characterized as racist, nativist, and white nationalist. He has leveraged the widely debunked white genocide and Great Replacement conspiracy theories to stoke fearmongering and mobilize his base, a tactic political observers have characterized as deliberate "rage-bait" strategizing.

Prior to his gubernatorial campaign, Fishback worked as a research analyst at the hedge fund Greenlight Capital before founding the investment firm Azoria Partners. His run for office brought heightened scrutiny to his background, including his unsuccessful 2025 bid for the Federal Reserve Board of Governors, false claims regarding an advisory role with the Department of Government Efficiency (DOGE), legal disputes concerning his business activities, and allegations of misconduct involving sexually grooming a 17-year-old, which he has denied.

== Early life ==
James Thomas Fishback was born on January 1, 1995, in Davie, Florida. His mother is an immigrant from Colombia, and his father owned a landscaping business before becoming a bus driver. Fishback attributes the failure of his father's business to the arrival of Haitian migrants under temporary protected status following the 2010 earthquake.

Growing up, Fishback spent his summers in Colombia. Fishback has claimed Arkansas governor William Meade Fishback as his ancestor. He graduated from Boyd H. Anderson High School, which had a primarily Black student body, and participated in his high school's debate team. Fishback enrolled at Georgetown University to study international economics, but dropped out after sophomore year.

== Business career ==
In 2019, Fishback founded Incubate Debate, a debate league that provides tournaments and training for middle and high school students. Fishback stated that he formed Incubate Debate due to frustration with ideological biases held by National Speech and Debate Association judges. Incubate Debate was acquired by the Bill of Rights Institute in 2024, but control of the organization later reverted to Fishback, who stated that the acquisition was "dissolved".

Fishback joined the hedge fund Greenlight Capital in 2021. Fishback was employed by Greenlight Capital as a research analyst until 2023; Greenlight stated Fishback resigned ahead of a planned termination for low productivity. Fishback claimed that he resigned after being subjected to anti-Christian discrimination.

Fishback wrote for The Free Press during 2023 and 2024.

In 2023, Fishback founded Azoria Partners, an investment management firm focused on global macro strategies. In June 2025, Azoria launched the Azoria 500 Meritocracy ETF, which tracks the S&P 500 but excludes companies with diversity, equity, and inclusion (DEI) policies. The Meritocracy ETF, along with another ETF run by Fishback, was shut down in October by Azoria's independent trustees. The board stated that it made the decision after considering factors including "recent litigation involving a principal of" Azoria. Fishback alleged that the liquidations were motivated by anti-conservative bias. In an April 2026 hearing, Fishback stated that he was "no longer involved" in Azoria Capital, having left the company that January.

In July 2025, Azoria unsuccessfully sued to make the Federal Open Market Committee's July 29 meeting public. In August 2025, Fishback contacted President Donald Trump and several of his advisors in an attempt to secure the seat on the Federal Reserve Board of Governors vacated by Adriana Kugler. He visited the Federal Reserve's market symposium in Jackson Hole on August 22, where he repeatedly yelled at member Lisa Cook. After a Florida-based social media account posted an unattributed claim on X that Fishback was being considered for the seat, speculation sparked online and on cable news networks that he was a serious contender. However, the Trump administration concluded that Fishback had fabricated the entire news cycle. Fishback was never considered for the role, and Trump named Stephen Miran to the position in September.

== Political campaigns ==
=== 2026 Florida gubernatorial campaign ===
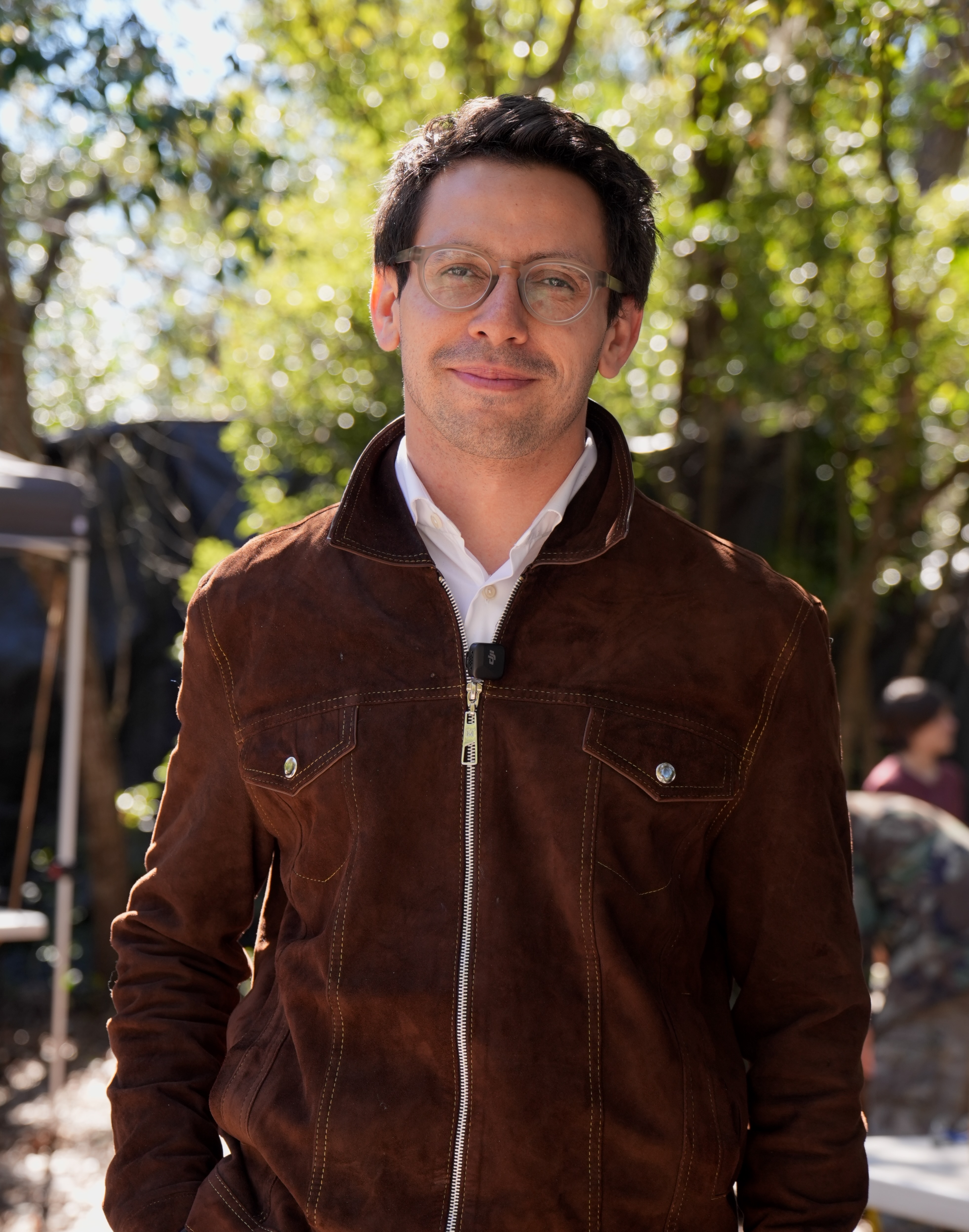
Fishback in February 2026

On November 24, 2025, Fishback announced his candidacy for the Republican nomination in the 2026 Florida gubernatorial election, in what was broadly characterized as a long-shot bid.

Fishback was described as a strong supporter of Florida governor Ron DeSantis, who declined to put out an endorsement in the race, and praised his "historical record" while in office. On January 18, 2026, Fishback publicly split with DeSantis advisor Christina Pushaw, who had been informally advising his campaign, due to increasing political disagreements.

During his campaign, Fishback defended supporters of far-right political commentator Nick Fuentes, saying, "I've found the audience of young men who follow and watch Nick Fuentes to be actually incredibly informed and insightful and very patriotic." These comments drew criticism from political opponents and advocacy groups. Some commentators, including writers for The Nation, have described Fishback as a "Groyper", an association he has both disputed and embraced. Fuentes expressed support for his candidacy but stopped short of endorsing him, saying it could hurt Fishback's bid for Governor. On January 9, 2026, Fishback appeared on Tucker Carlson's podcast, where Carlson endorsed him.

On January 14, 2026, the Fishback campaign reported that it had raised $19,000, significantly less than other contenders in the race. By April, it had raised just over $295,000, still far below the other contenders and with the least amount of money left to spend. Separately, Florida First PAC had raised $535,000 through May 2026, in support of Fishback.

In June 2026, the Republican Party of Florida said they would be inviting Fishback to speak at the Sunshine State Showdown candidate forum. However, the party announced that Fishback, as well as primary candidates Jay Collins and Paul Renner, had not qualified to appear in a gubernatorial debate at the event. The debate's minimum criteria to participate received criticism including from Florida Governor Ron DeSantis for its high threshold, which required $10 million in campaign donations, 10% support in a party-sponsored poll, and over 10,000 campaign donors. Shortly after, Fishback announced that he would participate in a CBS News debate unsanctioned by the Florida Republican Party, violating internal party rules which led to the party rescinding its invitation to Fishback.

Fishback finished third in the August 19 Republican primary, winning about 177,000 (10.5%) of the votes cast.

==== Racial comments ====
Miles Bryan of Vox described Fishback as a white supremacist who "espouses openly racist and antisemitic views" and has close ties to individuals in the Groyper movement. The Verge considers Fishback to be a "white supremacist candidate". His comments have been described by media organizations and politicians across the political spectrum as racist.

In his video announcing his run for governor, Fishback criticized the Congressional record of Trump-endorsed opponent Byron Donalds, and later attacked Donalds for his ties to "corporate interests", calling him a "slave". On January 12, he referred to Donalds as "By'rone" and accused him of wanting to "turn Florida into a Section 8 ghetto". According to The American Conservative, Fishback denied claims that he's racist, saying "I'm going to fight for you with equal vigor, whether you're black or you're white, straight or gay, Christian, Muslim or a Jew". Fishback later posted a video on social media platform X of himself shooting an assault rifle at a shooting range, with the caption, "Pull up, Byron Donalds. Let's see if you're really black". Later, during an appearance on The Matan Show podcast, Fishback said he liked playing as black characters while committing crimes in the video game series Grand Theft Auto, stating "it felt more authentic".

While advocating against junk food in school cafeterias, Fishback referred to it as "goyslop", an antisemitic term used to claim that Jews control the fast-food industry with the intention of making non-Jews unhealthy. When asked about why he had used the term, Fishback replied, "Because it's funny. Get a life."

During a campaign stop on April 3, 2026, Fishback told a black man that he "should be lynched" after the man asked about allegations of Fishback having sexual relations with an underage girl.

=== 2028 presidential campaign ===
In late October 2026, Fishback announced at an event that he will run for president in the 2028 election. This is despite him being, per the U.S. Constitution, ineligible to serve that presidential term due to his age.

== Political views ==
Fishback's views have been characterized by media as white supremacist, nativist, and Christian nationalist. He has been described as the first "Groyper" political candidate, and his statements and views have been seen as supportive of political commentator Nick Fuentes and his followers. His campaign has been described as provocative and deploying "rage-bait" tactics to gain popular attention with a large online presence. Fishback's views have been condemned as hateful and racist by both Republican and Democratic opponents as well as other organizations during the 2026 gubernatorial campaign.

=== Civil and social views ===
Fishback supports a complete ban on abortion, including in cases of rape and incest, as well as a ban on surrogacy. He opposes same-sex marriage and supports banning same-sex marriage in Florida if the U.S. Supreme Court overturns Obergefell v. Hodges. He has expressed belief in the white genocide and Great Replacement conspiracy theories. Fishback has been described as espousing white nationalist talking points, appealing to Christian nationalists, "flirting with white nationalist subcultures", and promoting white nationalist ideas. He has called gun waiting periods "unconstitutional". Fishback has said that OnlyFans has exploited women, and has proposed a 50% sin tax on income produced by OnlyFans content creators to support crisis pregnancy centers, mental health initiatives, and education systems.

On January 30, after journalist Don Lemon was arrested for covering an anti-ICE protest inside a Saint Paul church, Fishback wrote that "Don Lemon is lucky he's not getting hanged in the public square for ransacking a church."

Fishback has stated that capital punishment should be used as sparingly as possible, and reserved "for the most heinous crimes committed in our state". He has called for the public hanging of the co-conspirators of Jeffrey Epstein, and has pledged to appoint a special prosecutor and reopen state investigations into the Epstein files.

Fishback opposes the legalization of recreational cannabis, while supporting medical cannabis.

=== Domestic and economic policy ===
Fishback has been characterized as an economic populist. On homelessness, he has proposed using state resources, including the Florida National Guard, to remove homeless encampments and relocate individuals into facilities where he says they would receive treatment and services. He supports eliminating property taxes on homestead properties, and supports banning investment firms from purchasing single-family homes. Fishback additionally supports levying a $50,000 tax on out-of-state buyers trying to purchase a home in Florida. He has stated that his focus on affordability has been inspired by the campaign of New York City mayor Zohran Mamdani, although he disagrees with Mamdani's proposed solutions to the affordability crisis. He supports paid maternity leave.

Fishback supports raising the pay of public school teachers by 25%. He supports requiring school uniforms in Florida's public schools, while providing families with a $250 per child stipend to purchase them. Fishback hopes to end the presence of international students at Florida public universities by instituting $1 million tuition fees for foreign students.

Fishback opposes the construction of AI data centers in Florida, arguing they would increase energy costs. He holds conservationist views on the environment and has pledged to preserve more park space. Fishback has stated that he supports further restoration of the Everglades, conserving state parks, and cleaning waterways.

=== Foreign policy ===
Fishback has pledged to refuse campaign donations from organizations affiliated with foreign countries, specifically naming the American Israel Public Affairs Committee (AIPAC). He has condemned both the October 7 attacks and Israel's handling of the Gaza war, labeling Prime Minister Benjamin Netanyahu an "immoral war criminal". Fishback has stated that he previously supported Israel but changed his views after witnessing bombings on the Holy Family Church and the Gaza genocide. He has pledged to direct all Florida government entities to divest from Israel Bonds if elected, and reinvest the funds into statewide housing assistance. He has also criticized politicians for visiting Israel and kissing the "stupid" Western Wall. Fishback is opposed to U.S. involvement in the 2026 Iran war.

=== Immigration ===
Fishback has campaigned to abolish the H-1B visa program and pledged to fire state government employees working under it. He supports levying a $200,000 annual fine per worker on companies who hire H-1B visa employees. He is against immigration to the United States and has stated that he supports a "complete immigration moratorium".

=== Public transportation and infrastructure ===
Fishback supports reopening the Florida portion of Amtrak's Sunset Limited route, halted after Hurricane Katrina. He made a social media post promising to "make the trains run on time", a phrase associated with praise for Benito Mussolini.

Fishback supports eliminating tolls for Florida residents, arguing they have already paid for roads through taxes. He has also proposed higher tolls for out-of-state drivers.

Fishback pledged to ban Flock surveillance cameras if elected.

== Legal disputes and controversies ==
=== Job title dispute ===
In October 2023, Fishback sued Greenlight Capital over a dispute regarding his job title, claiming he had served as "head of macro". Greenlight denied the position ever existed and countersued in June 2024 for breach of contract, defamation, and misappropriation of confidential information.

In September 2025, Fishback admitted to violating his employment agreement by sharing proprietary portfolio strategies via personal email and maintaining an undisclosed trading account. Under the settlement, he agreed to a permanent injunction, the return or deletion of Greenlight materials, and payment of the firm's legal expenses.

Citing an inability to pay, Fishback faced subsequent asset enforcement actions, including the repossession of his vehicle and a January 2026 federal magistrate order directing him to surrender Azoria stock and luxury items to the U.S. Marshals Service. His defense counsel withdrew in March 2026 over unpaid legal fees.

On November 10, 2026, David Einhorn, the president of Greenlight, wrote on X that Greenlight had "won all litigation with James Fishback". Einhorn wrote that Greenlight had been awarded $4 million in damages, equivalent to Fishback's total compensation during his time at Greenlight, in accordance with faithless servant doctrine. Einhorn said he would donate the damages to the National Immigration Forum, the Center for Reproductive Rights, the Florida Rights Restoration Coalition, and the Florida chapter of the Anti-Defamation League.

=== Underage sexual grooming allegation ===
In 2022, the Broward County School District cut ties with Fishback and his organization, Incubate Debate, following allegations that he sexually groomed a 17 year-old girl employed by Incubate Debate, who was 16 when she joined. Fishback was 27 at the time. The allegations led to the resignation of an Incubate Debate board member. Fishback threatened the parents who made the allegation with legal action. Fishback and the employee moved in together in spring 2023, after she turned 18, and were briefly engaged in 2024 before publicly breaking up. Fishback has denied any inappropriate contact prior to the employee's reaching the age of consent, a denial which she disputes. A judge rejected her January 2025 request for a restraining order against Fishback for alleged harassment after the relationship's end, due to a lack of evidence. Fishback has denied wrongdoing and stated that he has never been arrested, charged with, or convicted of a crime.

=== DOGE adviser claims ===
In February 2025, Fishback proposed the "DOGE Dividend", a plan to return 20% of savings attributed to the Department of Government Efficiency (DOGE) directly to taxpayers. Later in 2025, he publicly described himself as an adviser to DOGE and said he had worked with the initiative from its beginning until May or June. Multiple senior DOGE officials confirmed that period said Fishback had never held an official or informal advisory role with the organization and accused him of exaggerating or fabricating his association with it. After Fishback claimed in a post on X to have been a DOGE adviser, a spokesperson for DOGE head Elon Musk said the claim was untrue. Fishback disputed the characterization, saying his involvement stemmed from his proposal for the "DOGE Dividend" and that the disagreement was over the meaning of the term "adviser".

== Personal life ==
Fishback resides in Madison, Florida; he also owns a condominium in Washington, D.C. He is Catholic and speaks English and Spanish. On May 23, 2026, Fishback married Valeria Quimby-Moro (born 2001). Fishback and Quimby-Moro had first met in March 2026 in a Miami bookstore.

In 2012, Fishback registered to vote as Republican in Florida. According to the Orlando Sentinel, Fishback registered to vote in Washington, D.C., in 2020 as an Independent. (Note: In the U.S., it is legal to be registered to vote in multiple states, providing you do not cast ballots in both during the same election.) Fishback's reported Washington, D.C. residence was claimed as a homestead exemption, and identified as his primary domicile according to a property appraiser, raising media doubts on his eligibility to run for governor in Florida. (Note: Florida state law requires gubernatorial candidates to live and be registered to vote in the state for at least seven years prior to running.) Fishback denied the report, stating that the information is incorrect.

On February 8, 2026, local authorities responded to a small fire at his Madison County property. While Fishback characterized it as "political violence", local law enforcement and fire rescue did not open a criminal probe or classify the incident as arson.

== Electoral history ==
2026 Florida Gubernatorial Republican primary results
Party	Candidate	Votes	%
Republican	Byron Donalds	809,109	47.8
Republican	Jay Collins	425,879	25.2
Republican	James Fishback	177,329	10.5
