= WSLX =

- New Canaan, Connecticut; United States
- Frequency: 91.9 MHz

Programming
- Format: Variety

Ownership
- Owner: St. Luke's School; (St. Luke's Foundation, Inc.)

History
- First air date: 1973
- Call sign meaning: SLX = "St. Luke's"

Technical information
- Licensing authority: FCC
- Facility ID: 62148
- Class: D
- ERP: 19 watts
- HAAT: 53 meters (174 ft)
- Transmitter coordinates: 41°11′32″N 73°29′46″W

Links
- Public license information: Public file; LMS
- Webcast: Listen live (via TuneIn)
- Website: www.wslx.org

WSLX (91.9 FM) is a non-commercial high school radio station licensed to serve New Canaan, Connecticut. The station is owned by St. Luke's School in the same town and licensed to the St. Luke's Foundation, Inc. It airs a Variety music format.

The station was assigned the WSLX call letters by the Federal Communications Commission.
