= Matan Even =

American YouTuber and influencer (born 2007)

- Born: April 23, 2007
- Occupations: Online personality; Comedian; YouTuber
- Years active: 2019–present

TikTok information
- Page: Matan Even
- Followers: 1.3 million

YouTube information
- Channel: Matan Even
- Genres: Podcast; comedy
- Subscribers: 1.84 million
- Views: 1.14 billion
- Last updated: November 6, 2026

Matan Even is an American comedian and YouTuber known for pranks and absurdist humor. Even's character comedy has been associated with satire of conservative politics in the United States.

In 2019, Even first rose to prominence at the age of 12 as an activist for the pro-democracy movement in Hong Kong through high-profile pranks at NBA games and at BlizzCon 2019, following increased pressure faced by United States companies from the Chinese government during the 2019–2020 Hong Kong protests.

After the end of the protests, Even returned to fame in 2022 when, at that year's Game Awards ceremony, he gave a nonsensical acceptance speech dedicated to "Rabbi Bill Clinton" when Elden Ring won Game of the Year, despite not being involved in the game's development. After the event, Even further gate crashed the streams of online streamers, including Hasan Piker and Kai Cenat.

Since 2023, he runs a weekly podcast, The Matan Show, featuring celebrity guests such as Hunter Biden, Matt Gaetz, Sal Vulcano, John Kiriakou, Joost Klein, Cliffe and Stuart Knechtle, Yosef Mizrachi, Gavin McInnes, Howie Mandel, Cesar Millan, George Santos, Gene Simmons, Oliver Tree, James Fishback, and Bassem Youssef.

== Early life and activism ==
At 12 years old, Even gained internet fame when he spoke out against the Chinese government's actions in Hong Kong during the 2019–2020 Hong Kong protests. During a Los Angeles Clippers game, Even tricked the live audience camera into featuring him, before flashing a T-shirt which stated, "Fight for Freedom, Stand up for Hong Kong", echoing a tweet by Houston Rockets manager Daryl Morey that damaged relations between the NBA and the Chinese government. Following that incident, he appeared at BlizzCon 2019 and yelled "Free Hong Kong" after Blizzard Entertainment had suspended a Hong Kong player for their pro-democracy activism. For his disruptive pranks, Even was featured on Time Magazine and Infowars.

Following the end of the Hong Kong protests, Even went on a hiatus until 2022, where he pivoted into absurdist and satirical comedy, particularly of conservatism in the United States.

== Game Awards prank ==
Even returned to fame at the age of 15, after a prank he carried out at the Game Awards 2022. When Elden Ring won Game of the Year, Even joined the developers as they walked onstage and gave an acceptance speech in a fake accent, dedicating the award "to [his] Reformed Orthodox rabbi Bill Clinton." Even was not involved in the development of Elden Ring but had bought a regular ticket to the event, joining the developers toward the end of the awards ceremony, after their win had been announced.

Even's nonsensical speech drew speculation as to whether he had engaged in far-right or anti-semitic dog whistles. In later interviews, Even, who is Jewish himself, denied any affiliation with the far-right or political motivation behind the prank, which was described by Polygon as "shitposting" and by Kotaku as "trolling".

== Social media career ==
Following the event, Even returned to social media as an online streamer, retaining his fake accent and in-character comedy. Even continued pranking other celebrities, including Kai Cenat, JaVale McGee, and Hasan Piker, whose videos of the pranks went viral on TikTok.

In 2025, Even was announced as the emcee of the 113th New York Young Republican Club Gala. In the lead up to the event, Even livestreamed with right-wing content creator Sneako, before giving an opening speech that incorporated the SpongeBob SquarePants theme song, mocked the audience and Republican politicians, and was met with boos. In 2026, he performed a satirical rendition of Eminem's The Real Slim Shady at ComplexCon as part of the set of Playboi Carti's Opium producer F1lthy.

Even runs a podcast, The Matan Show, which has featured political figures, MMA fighters, online influencers and celebrities. Right-wing political figures featured on the show include George Santos; Tim Pool, who Even revealed to be balding; and James Fishback, who, when questioned about the Grand Theft Auto game franchise, stated that he preferred playing black characters as it was more authentic to the game.
