= Bari Lurie =

American non-profit executive

Bari Lurie (born Bari Allison Lurie) is an American non-profit executive who serves as chief of staff to Chelsea Clinton at the Clinton Foundation. She previously worked for Hillary Clinton and the Washington Nationals, and has been described as one of the most influential people in Clinton's orbit.

== Career ==
Lurie worked as an intern at the White House as a university freshman during the Clinton administration. By the time she was a junior, she was employed full-time by Hillary Clinton. She worked on Clinton's 2000 campaign for the senate, Leadership PAC, and 2008 presidential campaign. In 2007, she transitioned to the private sector to work for the Washington Nationals as director of ballpark enterprises. Lurie joined the Clinton Foundation in 2011 to serve as chief of staff to Chelsea Clinton.

In 2015, POLITICO listed her as one of the 50 most influential people in Hillary Clinton's orbit.

== Personal life ==
The daughter of Deborah and Marc Lurie, Lurie attended Nicolet High School in Glendale, Wisconsin, on the outskirts of Milwaukee. During her senior year of high school, she spent a semester in Washington, D. C. to page for then-Senator Herb Kohl. Following high school, she moved to Washington, D. C. to attend George Washington University where she earned her bachelor of arts in political communication in 2003. At GW, Lurie was a member of Sigma Delta Tau's Alpha Tau chapter and a member of the university's College Democrats. She is married to Jeffrey Westerberg, a director at PricewaterhouseCoopers since 2015. She is Jewish.
