= Nový Bor =

- Town
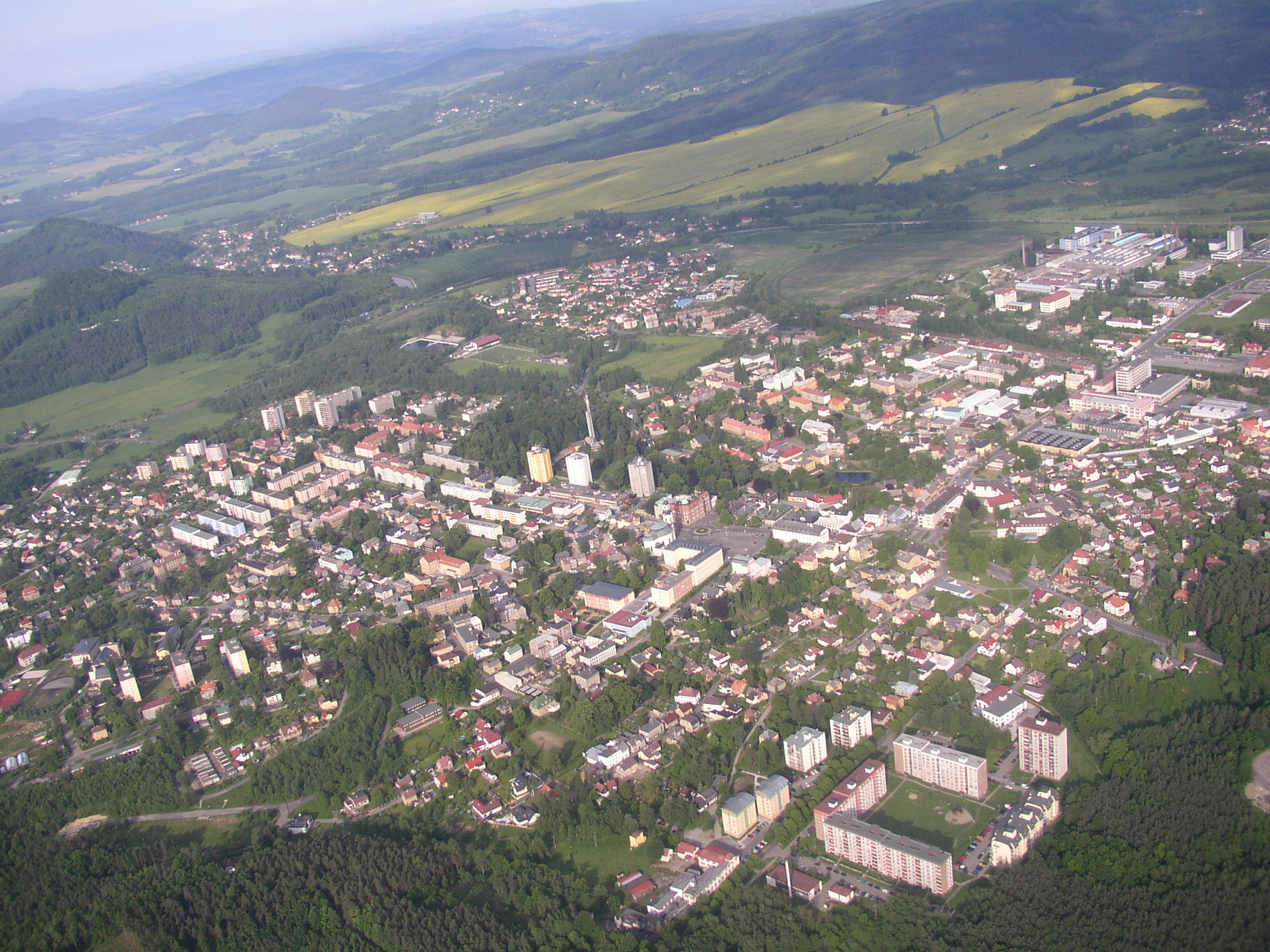
- Aerial view of Nový Bor

- Flag Coat of arms

- Location in the Czech Republic
- Coordinates: 50°45′19″N 14°33′13″E
- Country: Czech Republic
- Region: Liberec
- District: Česká Lípa
- Founded: 1692

Government
  - Mayor: Tomáš Mašek

Area
  - Total: 19.44 km^{2} (7.51 sq mi)
- Elevation: 365 m (1,198 ft)

Population (2026-01-01)
  - Total: 11,257
  - Density: 579.1/km^{2} (1,500/sq mi)
- Time zone: UTC+1 (CET)
  - Summer (DST): UTC+2 (CEST)
- Postal codes: 471 18, 473 01
- Website: www.novy-bor.cz

Nový Bor (Czech pronunciation: [ˈnoviː ˈbor]; German: Haida) is a town in Česká Lípa District in the Liberec Region of the Czech Republic. It has about 11,000 inhabitants.

Nový Bor was founded in 1692. During the rule of the Kinsky family in the 18th century, the settlement experienced its greatest prosperity and was promoted to a town. Since the end of the 18th century, Nový Bor is known for the glass industry. The historic town centre is well preserved and is protected as an urban monument zone. The town's chess club 1. Novoborský ŠK is the most successful Czech chess club in modern history.

== Administrative division ==
Nový Bor consists of five municipal parts (in brackets population according to the 2021 census):

- Nový Bor (6,951)
- Arnultovice (3,398)
- Bukovany (182)
- Janov (375)
- Pihel (527)

== Etymology ==
The town's original German name Heyde was derived from local vegetation and means 'heather'. The Czech name Nový Bor was also derived from local vegetation and literally means 'new pine forest'.

== Geography ==
Nový Bor is located about 7 km (4 mi) north of Česká Lípa and 34 km (21 mi) west of Liberec. It lies mostly in the Ralsko Uplands, but in the north the municipal territory also extends into the Lusatian Mountains and Central Bohemian Uplands. The highest point is the hill Pramenný vrch at 605 m (1,985 ft) above sea level. The Šporka Stream flows through the town. The southern part of Nový Bor's territory is rich in fishponds.

== History ==
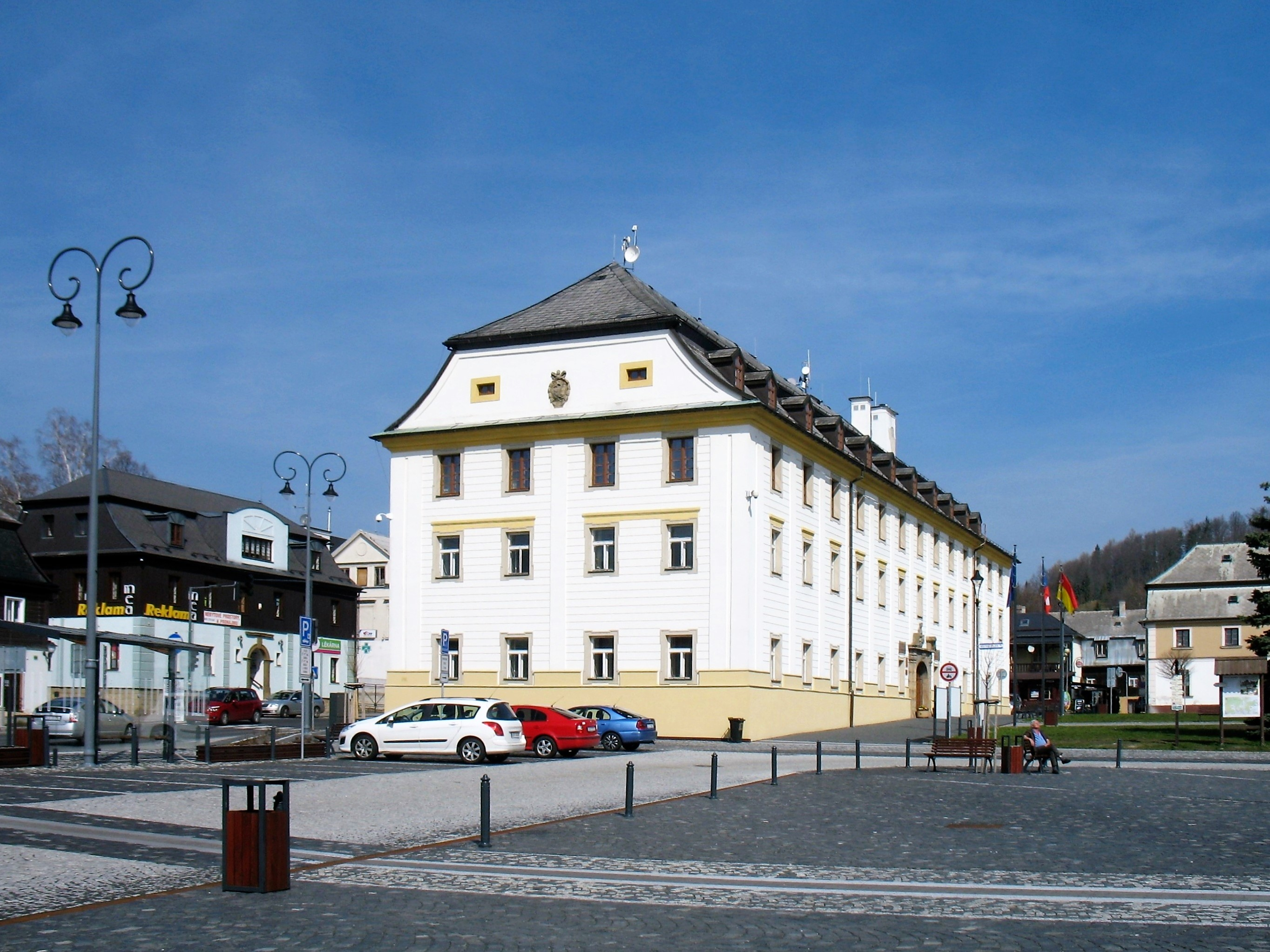
Town hall on Náměstí Míru

The first written mention of Nový Bor is from 1471, when the village Arnsdorff (Arnultovice) was founded, today a part of Nový Bor. In 1692, a new settlement was founded, and its construction was completed in 1703. The settlement was originally connected by mayor's law with Arnultovice, but it became separate in 1713.

In 1710, it became a property of the Kinsky noble family, and under their rule the settlement grew. At their request, the settlement was promoted to a town in 1757. Since the end of the 18th century Nový Bor became known for its large glass industry (as happened in the whole region). In 1869, the railway was built.

During the 19th and 20th centuries, several villages were merged with Nový Bor, as the last Arnultovice.

From 1938 to 1945, it was annexed by Nazi Germany and administered as part of the Reichsgau Sudetenland. From the establishment of a sovereign municipality in 1848 until 1948, the Czech name of the town changed several times – it was called Hajda, then Bor, then Hajda again, and then Bor u České Lípy. In 1948, it was renamed to its current name.

== Demographics ==
Historical population

Year	Pop.	±%
1869	6,300	—
1880	7,786	+23.6%
1890	8,006	+2.8%
1900	8,635	+7.9%
1910	9,537	+10.4%

Year	Pop.	±%
1921	8,862	−7.1%
1930	9,851	+11.2%
1950	7,229	−26.6%
1961	7,868	+8.8%
1970	8,669	+10.2%

Year	Pop.	±%
1980	10,828	+24.9%
1991	12,166	+12.4%
2001	12,342	+1.4%
2011	11,882	−3.7%
2021	11,433	−3.8%

Source: Censuses

== Economy ==
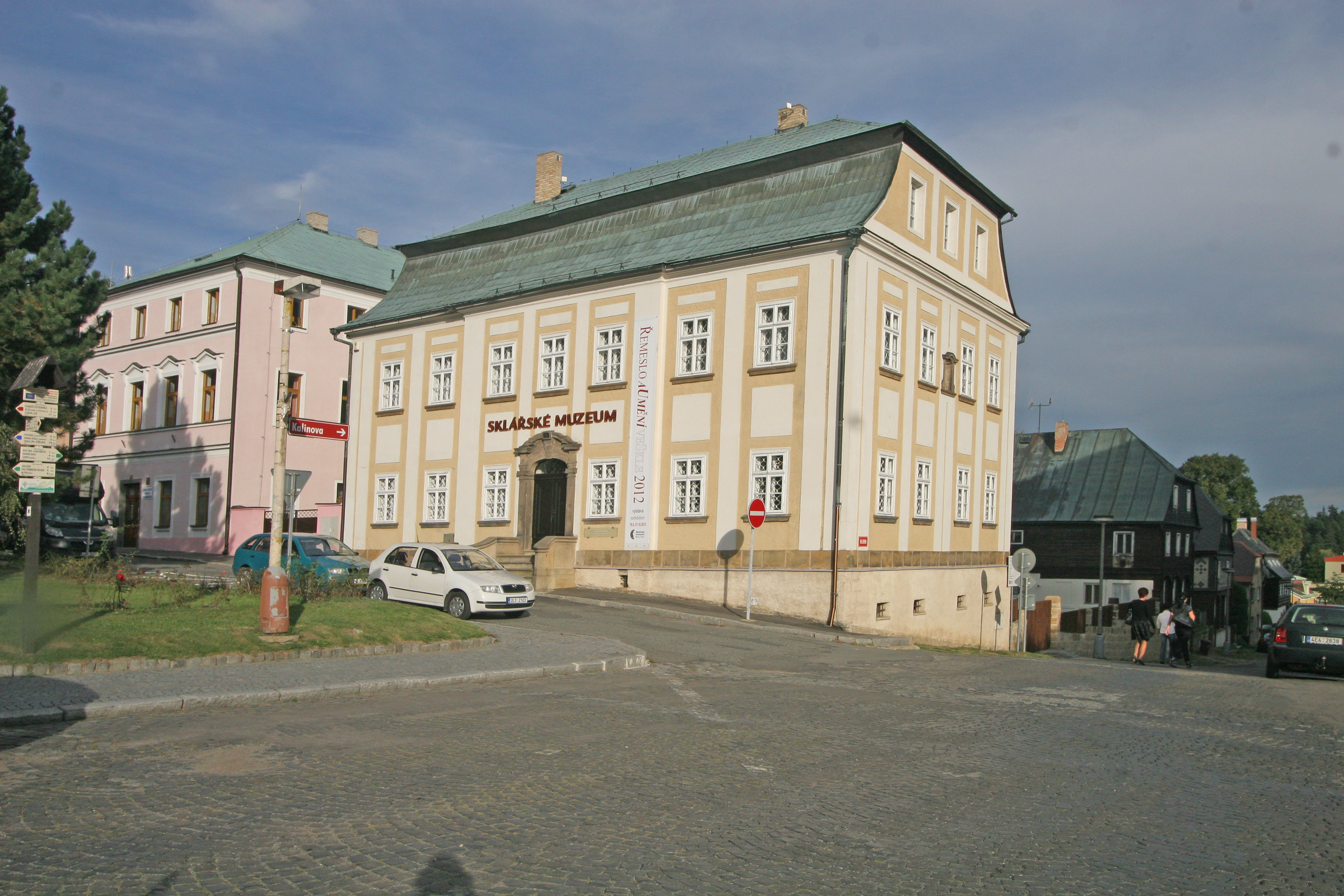
Glass Museum on Náměstí Míru

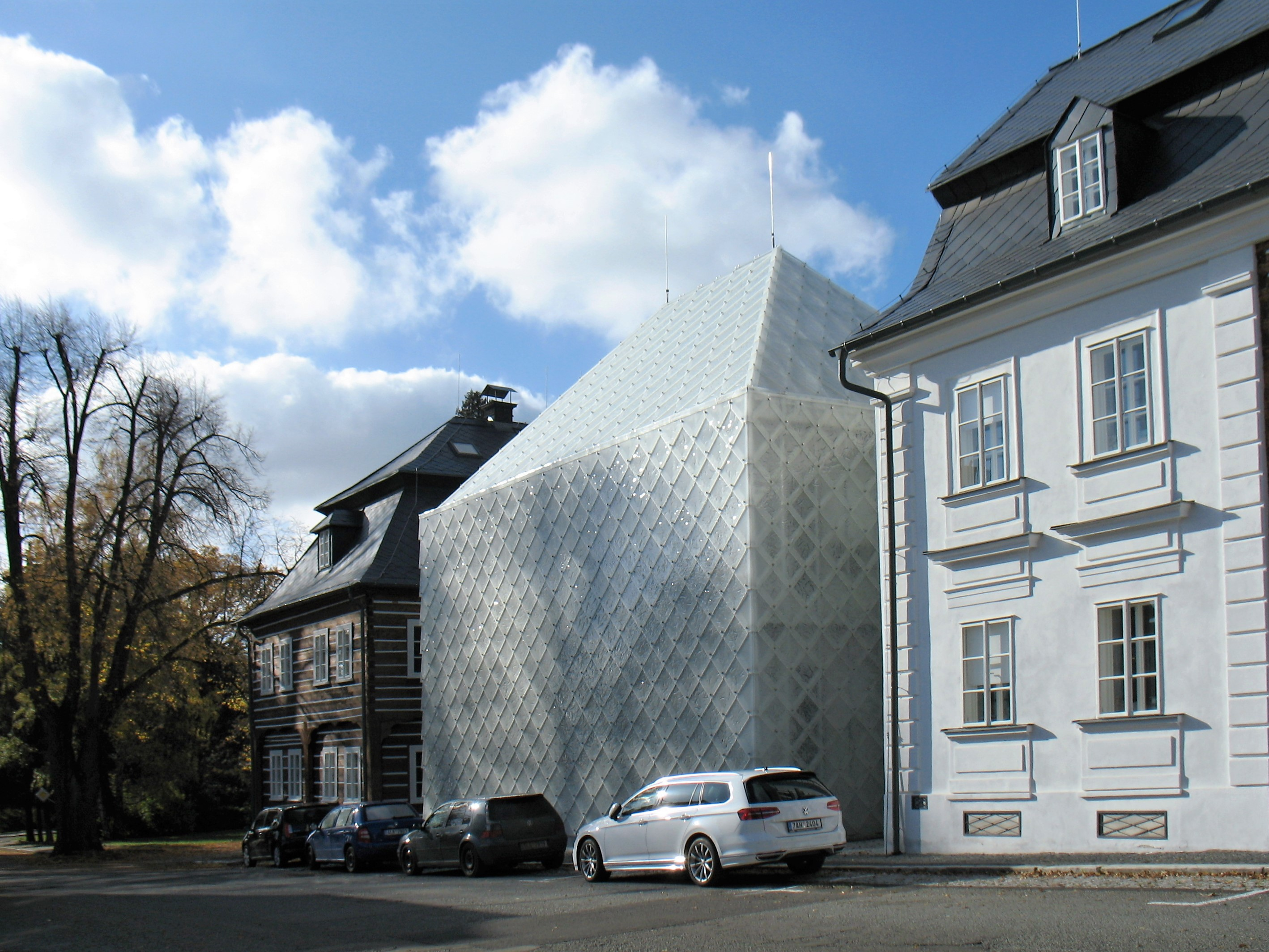
Old houses and new glass house

Nový Bor is known for its glass production. The Crystalex company is the largest glassworks in the country and belongs among the most significant regional employers.

== Transport ==
The I/13 road (the section from Liberec to Děčín, part of the European route E442) and the I/9 road (the section from Česká Lípa to Rumburk) bypass the town.

Nový Bor is located on the railway line Česká Lípa–Rumburk.

== Sport ==
The local chess club, 1. Novoborský ŠK, has been the most successful club in the top-tier Czech team competition in the 21st century. Between the 2009–10 and 2017–18 seasons, the club won nine consecutive titles. In the 2025–26 season, the club won its 15th title.

== Sights ==
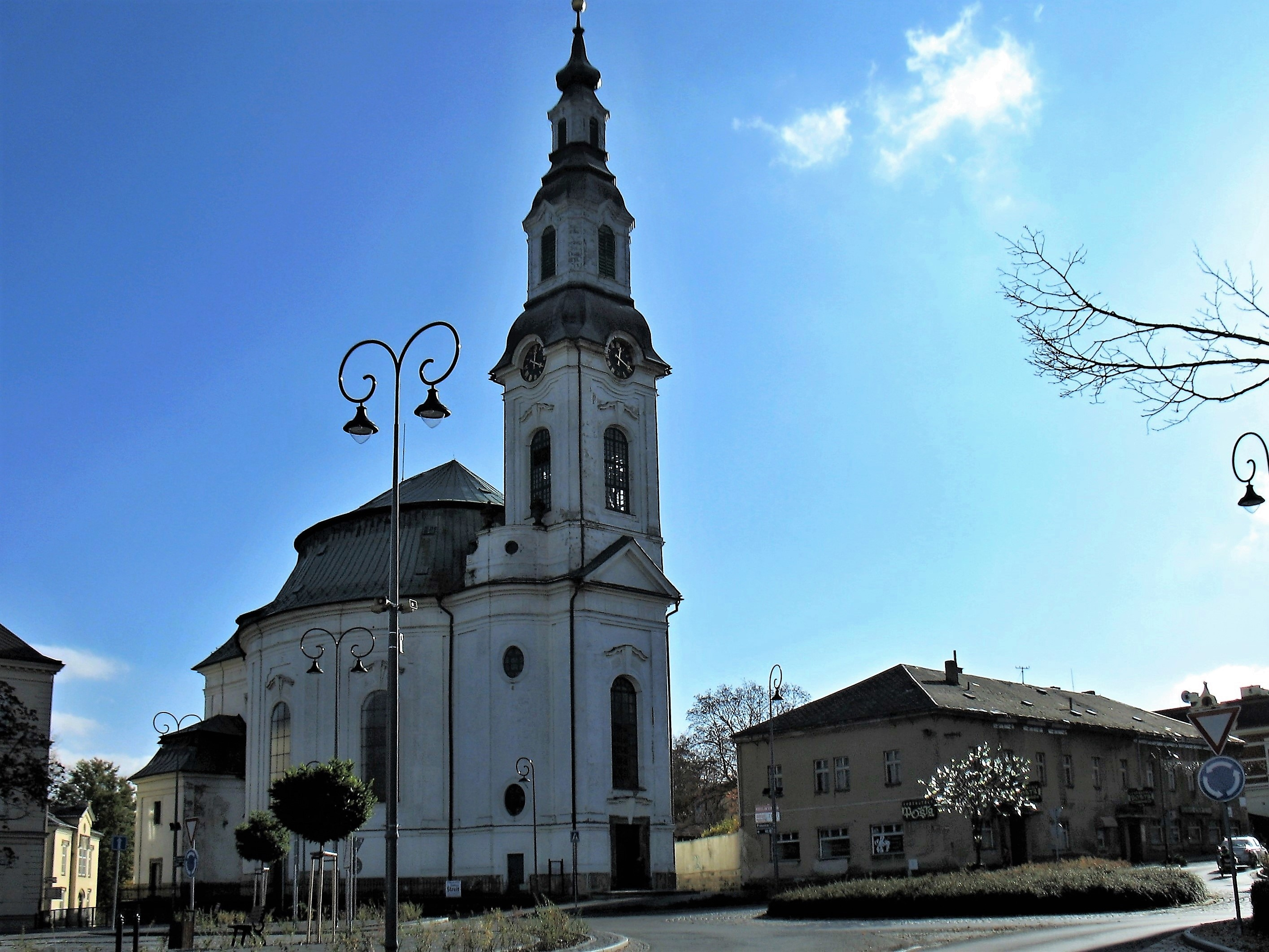
Church of the Assumption of the Virgin Mary

The historic centre is formed by the squares Náměstí Míru and Palackého náměstí, and their surroundings. The centre includes valuable Empire and Biedermeier houses. The town hall is from 1751, originally built as a manorial granary.

The Church of the Assumption of the Virgin Mary was rebuilt to its present Baroque form in 1786–1788. It contains a bell from 1606 and a rare pipe organ. The Virgin Mary statue behind the church is from the 18th century and is the oldest monument in the town.

The history of the glass industry in the region is presented in the Glass Museum Nový Bor. In addition to the permanent exhibition there are exhibitions of glass craftsmen.

== Notable people ==
- Josef Max (1804–1855), German-Czech sculptor
- Emanuel Max (1810–1901), German-Czech sculptor
- Wilhelm Knechtel (1837–1924), German-Czech gardener and botanist
- Ernst Schwarz (1895–1983), German philologist
- Volker Oppitz (born 1931), German economist and mathematician
- Věra Bradáčová (born 1955), athlete

== Twin towns – sister cities ==
Nový Bor is twinned with:

- Aniche, France
- Frauenau, Germany
- Zwiesel, Germany
