= St. Luke's School (Connecticut) =

School in New Canaan, Connecticut, US

Location
- 377 North Wilton Road; New Canaan, Connecticut 06840; United States

Information
- School type: Private
- Founded: 1928 (98 years ago)
- Founder: Edward B. Blakely
- CEEB code: 070460
- Chair: Rich Riley
- Head of school: Mary Halpin Carter
- Grades: 5–12
- Enrollment: 550
- Colors: Maroon and grey
- Slogan: Above & Beyond
- Athletics conference: Fairchester
- Sports: Basketball, baseball, softball, soccer, lacrosse, tennis, golf, squash, ice hockey, volleyball, cross country, field hockey, and football
- Mascot: Stormy
- Team name: The Storm
- Accreditation: Connecticut Association of Independent Schools, New England Association of Schools and Colleges
- Newspaper: The Sentinel
- Yearbook: The Caduceus
- Endowment: $51 Million (as of November, 2025)
- Tuition: $54,100 (Grades 5-6) - $56,480 (Grades 7-8) - $59,070 (Grades 9-12)
- Website: www.stlukesct.org

St. Luke's School is a private, secular, co-educational day school founded in 1928 and situated on a 40-acre (160,000 m^{2}) campus in New Canaan, Connecticut. St. Luke's offers a college-preparatory curriculum for grades 5 through 12, with a diverse student body of 594 from 30 towns in Connecticut and New York.

St. Luke's operates radio station WSLX (91.9 FM).

== History ==
=== Founding ===
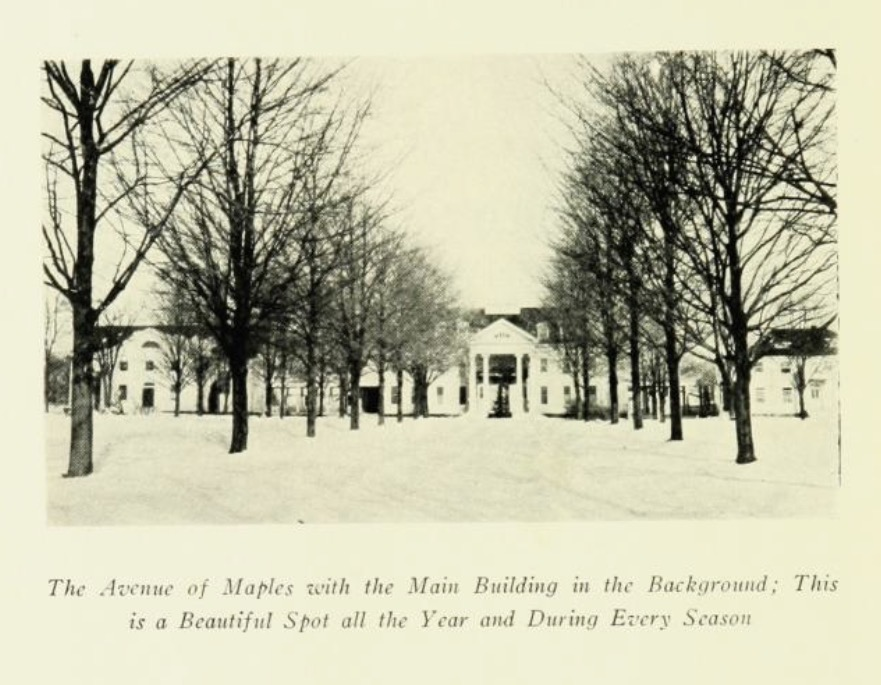
St. Luke’s School’s original building, pictured in the 1931 yearbook, now home to New Canaan Country School

St. Luke’s School was founded in 1928 by Edward B. Blakely, a graduate of Harvard University who also attended Columbia University’s College of Physicians and Surgeons. Blakely’s medical training likely influenced the school’s name, which references St. Luke, the patron saint of physicians and surgeons.

The school initially emphasized a traditional academic curriculum combined with physical activity and outdoor education. The school was initially located on the present day campus of New Canaan Country School. That 148 acre campus, formerly known as the Grace-House-in-the-Fields, was leased from Grace Church of New York. In 1937, Blakely relocated St. Luke’s to 63 Park Street in New Canaan. Blakely owned and operated the school for ten years before selling it in 1938.

=== Kidd and von Fabrice Era (1938-1962) ===
St. Luke’s was purchased in December 1937 by Dr. Joseph Kidd and William von Fabrice. Kidd and von Fabrice originally intended to have the school serve as the New Canaan branch of the Low-Heywood School for girls, now known as King School. The first academic year for their school began in September 1938 with seventeen students and six faculty members across all twelve grade levels. Enrollment increased to thirty-four students the following year. Dr. Kidd established a growth plan that aimed to increase enrollment by approximately 20 percent annually until reaching a cap of 200 students.

In 1940, St. Luke’s moved from Park Street to North Wilton Road, taking over the building of the Low-Heywood-in-New Canaan School, a coeducational branch of Stamford’s Low-Heywood School for pre-school through fourth grade. Low-Heywood had constructed the building for the branch, which opened in the mid-1930s and announced in 1940 that it would not reopen.

Athletics expanded during this period. A six-man football team had been introduced in 1938, and by the following year enrollment supported a full eleven-player team. The first basketball game was played in 1941 against Daycroft, and the school’s first baseball season took place in 1942.

In 1940, the student newspaper, The St. Luke’s Sentinel, was established, and the school yearbook was renamed The Caduceus, a title it retains today. In 1941, the first major campus improvement was completed with the construction of an athletic field at a cost of approximately $3,000.

A building fund was established in 1946, beginning with a $50 donation from Mrs. Charles D. Welling.

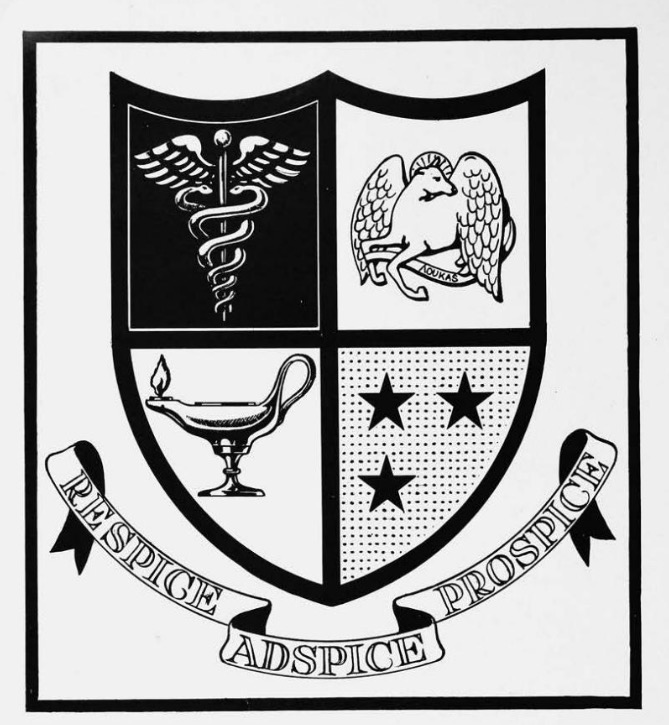
Escutcheon of St. Luke's School

In 1948, St. Luke’s School adopted its official coat of arms. The escutcheon consists of a shield divided into four quadrants, representing key elements of the school’s identity. These include the caduceus symbolizing medicine, a long-used school emblem, the lamp of learning, and three stars representing the pursuit of high ideals. Beneath the shield appears the school motto, “RESPICE, ADSPICE, PROSPICE,” translated as “Look to the Past; Look to the Present; Look to the Future.”

The escutcheon was designed by Mr. Levers, whose son Bob Levers graduated in 1947.

In 1955 Kidd, von Fabrice and Mrs. Enoch Megrue broke ground on the wing that finally gave St. Luke's a gymnasium, a study hall and locker rooms. It opened in spring 1956 with the first parents' dance, and the yearbooks from 1957 on describe compulsory gym periods twice a week. The same 1956 addition held the Anthony Wells Memorial Room, a faculty and parent conference room named for a student who died in 1952.

Smaller gifts filled in the campus. The classes of 1954 and 1957 gave the white entrance gates.

=== Kidd Sells St. Luke's ===
Enrollment expanded significantly under Kidd’s leadership, growing from the original seventeen students to approximately 240 by 1962. Following the death of William von Fabrice, Kidd elected to sell the school. The buyers were a group of New Canaan residents led by Emilio B. Knechtle, father of Cliffe Knechtle.

Dr. Kidd remained as head of school until 1964, von Fabrice became emeritus, and Knechtle took the title of director. Leadership transitioned to James Jacob following Kidd's departure, who served for six years. Knechtle also began Megrue Field, named for George '53 and John '54 Megrue, and drew up plans for a science wing and a new kitchen

During the 1960s, the school experienced declining enrollment and reputational challenges.

=== Harrington and Salomon ===
In response, two alumni, Roby Harrington, former CEO of Young & Rubicam, and Bob Salomon of Salomon Brothers, organized a volunteer board of trustees. This group acquired the school for one dollar, converted it into a nonprofit institution, and initiated organizational reforms that stabilized the school and marked the beginning of a new period in its history.

In the 70s, St. Luke’s would have five heads of school, seven including interim heads.

In 1978, the Dr. Kidd died, but his legacies remained: a popular teacher and coach he had hired and mentored—Dick Whitcomb.

=== Whitcomb Era (1980-2002) ===
In 1980, Dick Whitcomb, who had worked at St. Luke’s since 1961 and had served as interim head during the 1970s, became St. Luke’s ninth Head of School, a role he would play for the next twenty-two years.

Mr. Whitcomb was clear from the start of his headship that one of his main goals was to honor Dr. Kidd’s accomplishments and traditions. Dick achieved that goal and then went on to build his own lasting legacy.

The St. Luke’s motto, Enter to Learn. Go Forth to Serve. was introduced in Mr. Whitcomb's first year as Head of School. He was passionate about service.

By the time Mr. Whitcomb retired in 2002, he had fulfilled his vision of honoring Dr. Kidd while also leaving his own lasting imprint on St. Luke’s.

== Notable alumni ==
- Tyler Booker, Offensive Linemen for the Dallas Cowboys
- Paul Dalio, screenwriter, director and composer
- John Henson, actor, comedian and TV host
- Peter Golenbock, author, lawyer
- Brown Meggs, music industry executive, novelist. Signed the Beatles to Capitol Records in 1963
- Luke Murray, head coach for the Boston College Eagles men's basketball team, son of Bill Murray
- Olivia Palermo, socialite from The City
- Cliffe Knechtle, Pastor, author
- Zachary Cole Smith and Andrew Bailey of DIIV
- Noel Thomas Jr., wide receiver of Ottawa Redblacks
- Alexandra Truwit, Paralympic swimmer
- Cameron Wilson, professional golfer
- Igor Kipnis, harpsichordist
- Kent Bloomer, sculptor and professor at the Yale School of Architecture
- Buell Neidlinger, jazz bassist and cellist
- John Margolies, architecture critic and photographer
- Cameron R. Hume, U.S. Ambassador to Algeria, South Africa and Indonesia
- Harold McGraw III, former chairman and CEO of McGraw-Hill
- Anthony Lake, National Security Advisor
- Richard Seeborg, judge of the United States District Court for the Northern District of California
- Steve Miner, film director
- Dan Willard, computer scientist
