= Cliffe Knechtle =

American evangelist (born 1954)

The Reverend Cliffe Knechtle
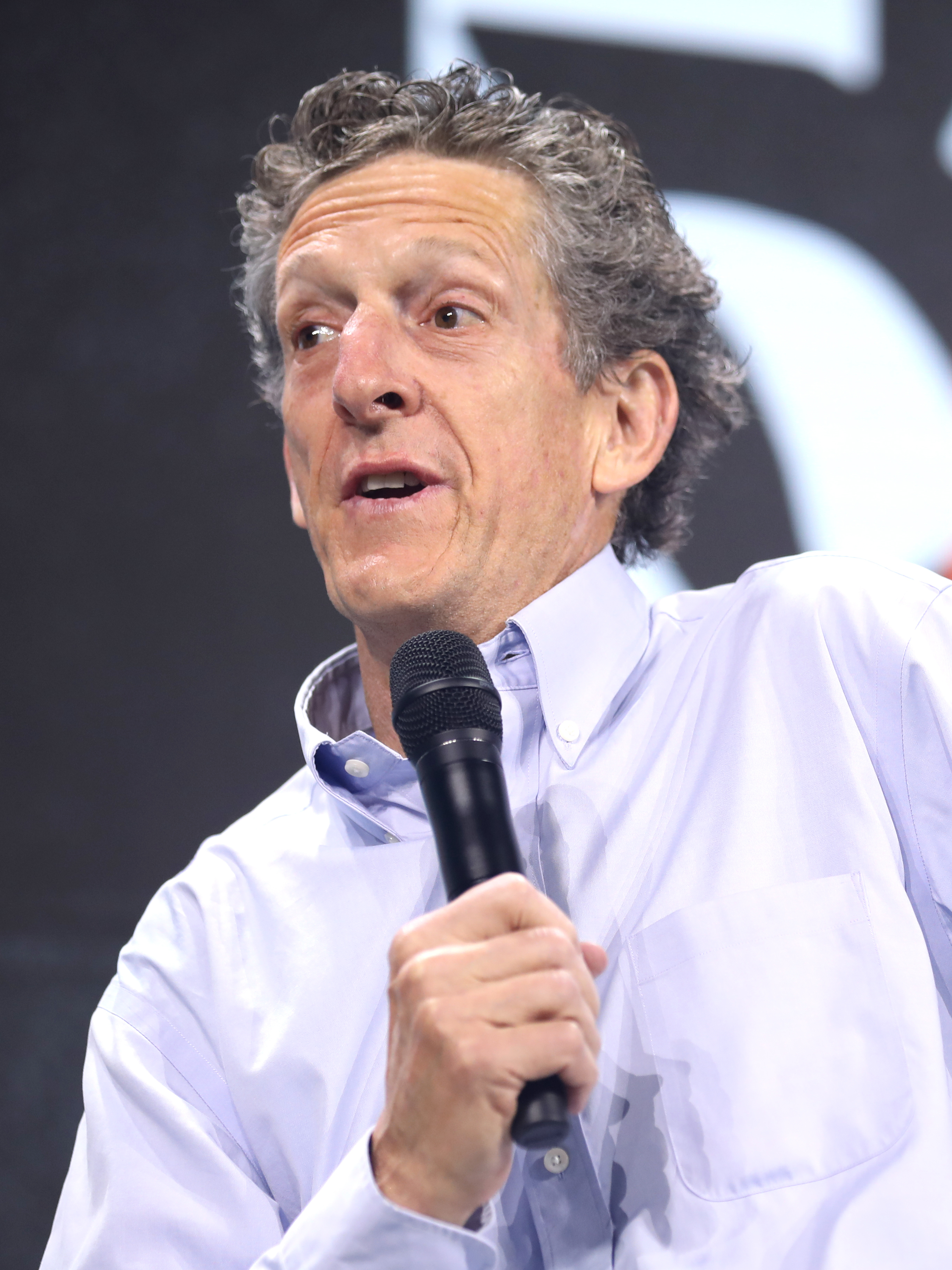
- Knechtle in 2024
- Born: May 20, 1954 (age 72); New York City, U.S.
- Education: Davidson College (BA); Gordon–Conwell Theological Seminary (MDiv)
- Occupations: Pastor; apologist; author
- Years active: 1979–present
- Employer: Grace Community Church (2001–present)
- Known for: Evangelism; apologetics
- Spouse: Sharon Knechtle
- Children: 3

YouTube information
- Channel: Give Me An Answer with Stuart & Cliffe Knechtle
- Subscribers: 967,000
- Views: 100.07 million
- Last updated: November 3, 2026
- Website: givemeananswer.org

Cliffe Knechtle (born May 20, 1954) is an American evangelist and pastor. Known as the founder of public apologetics ministry Give Me an Answer, he is the senior pastor of Grace Community Church in New Canaan, Connecticut.

Since the late 1970s, Knechtle has held open-air question-and-answer sessions on university campuses across the United States, and has continued this work alongside pastoral ministry since 2001.

Since the 2010s, recordings of his dialogues attracted large audiences on digital platforms like YouTube, TikTok, and Instagram. By 2025, Christianity Today reported his ministry had more than two million followers on TikTok and Instagram and over 900,000 subscribers on YouTube.

== Early life and education ==
Knechtle was born in New York City on May 20, 1954, to Emilio Knechtle, a Swiss-American businessman, and Ann Johnston, a nurse. Knechtle and Johnston married in 1950. Cliffe is the eldest of six children, and is named after his maternal grandfather. He attended St. Luke's School in Connecticut.

He attended Davidson College in North Carolina and later earned a Master of Divinity from Gordon–Conwell Theological Seminary, graduating in 1979.

== Career ==
After graduating, Knechtle began working with InterVarsity Christian Fellowship and various churches in the United States.

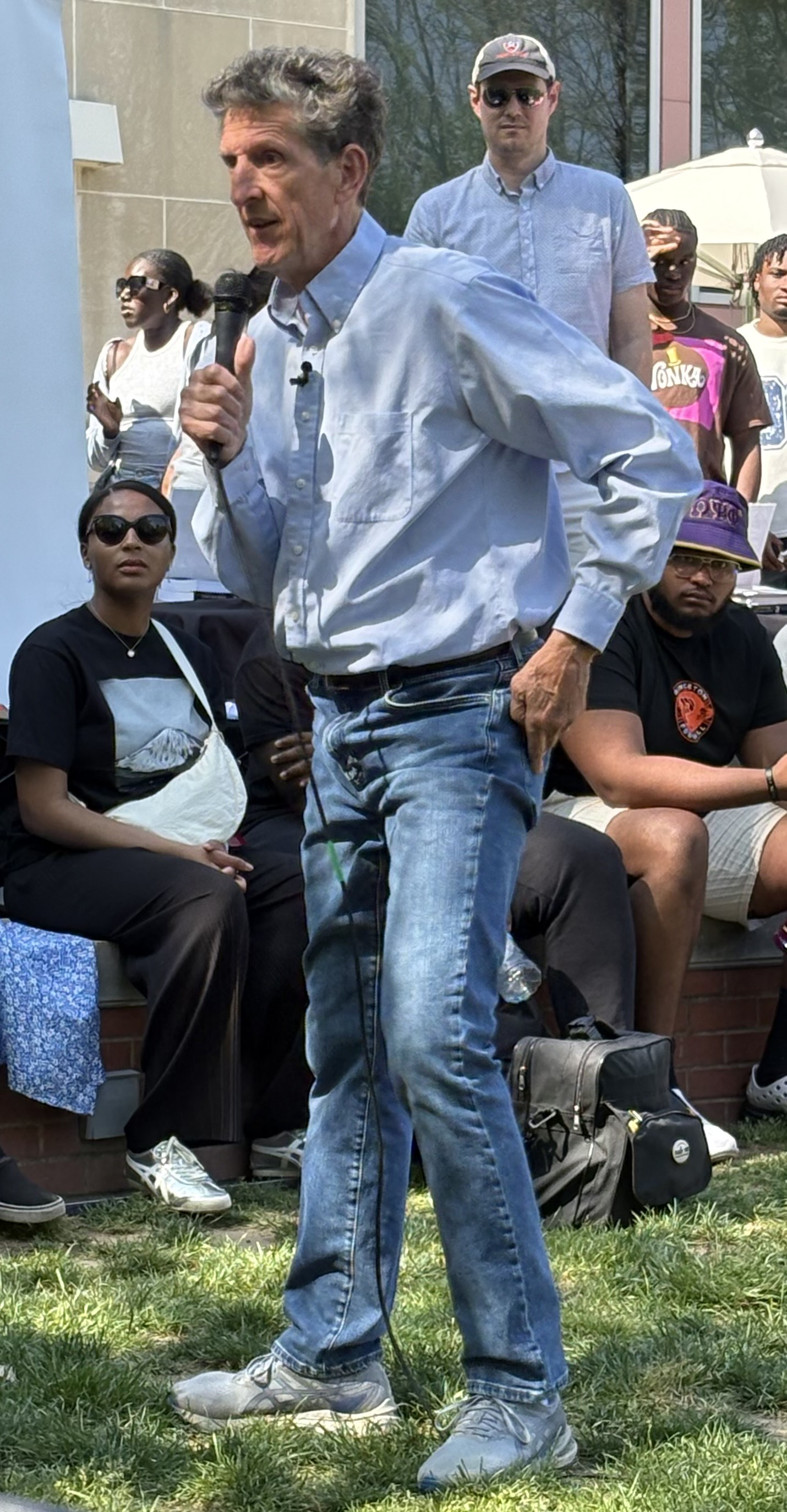
Knechtle speaking at Princeton University in 2025

In the early 1980s, he initiated open-air question-and-answer sessions on university campuses, which became a hallmark of his ministry. His style emphasized dialogue with students on issues of faith, ethics, and philosophy, rather than confrontational preaching. His first book, Give Me an Answer That Satisfies My Heart and My Mind (1986), was intended to extend this dialogue-based apologetic method beyond live settings.

In 1991, recordings of his campus events began airing on television as part of the program Give Me an Answer, which reached audiences in the United States and abroad.

Knechtle founded Grace Community Church in New Canaan, Connecticut, in 2001 and has served as its senior pastor since. While leading the church, he continued his campus evangelism through the Give Me an Answer ministry.

He has continued to appear at universities and public events, including a 2019 interview with Moody Audio, an episode of the podcast Within Reason with Alex O'Connor, and a convocation address at Liberty University in November 2024.

He has appeared in a variety of internet-based dialogues from Matan Even's podcast (in which he has appeared multiple times) to more contemporary forms of online discourse such as Harvard Q&A's.

In August 2024 and February 2025, Knechtle and his son Stuart appeared with Charlie Kirk on podcasts and on The Charlie Kirk Show.

Knechtle held Q&A sessions at Harvard University in April 2025.

In August 2025, Knechtle appeared on The Tucker Carlson Show.

== Personal life ==
He is married to Sharon Knechtle, with whom he has three children. Two of his sons, Stuart and Rob, serve on staff at Grace Community Church as pastors; Knechtle's third son is named Ian.

== Publications ==
- Give Me an Answer That Satisfies My Heart and My Mind: Answers to Your Toughest Questions about Christianity (Downers Grove, IL: InterVarsity Press, 1986).
- Help Me Believe: Direct Answers to Real Questions (Downers Grove, IL: InterVarsity Press, 2000).
