= Greenlight Capital =

American hedge fund

- Type: Private company
- Industry: Investment management
- Founded: 1996; 30 years ago
- Founder: David Einhorn; Jeffrey A. Keswin
- Headquarters: New York City, United States
- Key people: David Einhorn
- Products: Hedge fund
- AUM: ▼US$1.6 billion (as of March 30, 2020)
- Number of employees: 25
- Subsidiaries: Greenlight Capital Re, Ltd; Greenlight Masters; Greenlight Private Equity Partners
- Website: www.greenlightcapital.com

Greenlight Capital Re, Ltd.
- Type: Subsidiary
- Traded as: Nasdaq: GLRE (Class A); Russell 2000 Component
- Industry: Reinsurance
- Founded: 2004
- Founder: Greenlight Capital
- Headquarters: Dublin, Ireland and Cayman Islands
- Website: greenlightre.com

Greenlight Capital is an American hedge fund founded in 1996 by David Einhorn. Greenlight invests primarily in publicly traded North American corporate debt offerings and equities. Greenlight is most notable for its short selling of Lehman stock prior to Lehman Brothers' collapse in 2008 and the $11 million fine it received in January 2012 for insider trading in the UK. Einhorn remains the fund's manager.

It also operates Greenlight Capital Re, a property casualty reinsurer. Unlike other funds, Greenlight does not use borrowed money, or leverage. The firm does not generate large trading volumes. It also manages a fund of funds and a private equity fund through its affiliates, Greenlight Masters and Greenlight Private Equity Partners.

As of 2008, there were 25 employees, including nine analysts and one trader. It occupies a single high floor of an office building near Grand Central, in New York City.

== History ==
=== Foundation and early years ===
Founded in 1996 by Einhorn, with $900,000 (half borrowed from Einhorn's parents). Greenlight generated greater than a twenty-five percent annualized net return for its investors until 2007, but lackluster results later brought this to under fifteen percent It prospered in its early days by identifying weak financial firms for short selling, making significant gains from Conseco, CompuCredit, Sirrom Capital, and Resource America.

A few months before the dot-com bust, Greenlight lost 4% of its total capital on a short on Chemdex stock as it soared in price. A few months after Greenlight closed its position, Chemdex stock plunged to $2.

=== 2008 financial crisis ===
In the third quarter of 2008, Greenlight lost 15% of its value due to the 2008 financial crisis, primarily from long positions on industrial companies like Helix Energy Solutions, when the SEC temporarily banned short selling of financial stocks. With the majority of Greenlight's money in bonds and long positions on stocks, this stopped hedge funds minimizing 'long' losses or offsetting them with short gains. Greenlight ended 2008 down 23%, its first annual loss. In 2009, Greenlight recouped its losses from 2008.

Einhorn and Greenlight Capital were fined £7.2m by the FSA for insider trading in January 2012. According to the FSA, Einhorn and Greenlight had used inside information before selling shares of Punch Taverns in 2009, which helped avoid losses of £5.8m.

=== 2015–2020 underperformance ===
Greenlight Capital was down 20 percent for 2015.

In February 2015, Greenlight Capital was ranked 53rd out of 58 hedge funds, with a D grade, in the Institutional Investor's Alpha Hedge Fund Report Card. This was the second year in a row Greenlight Capital received a D from IIA.

Greenlight Capital greatly underperformed the bull market in 2017. For January 2018, Greenlights funds were down 6% for the month where the S&P 500 was up 5.6%.

In March 2020, the fund posted loss of 21.5% as the global coronavirus pandemic drove the stock markets down.

== Top equity holdings ==
As of 2019, the top equity holdings of the firm were in the shares of the following companies: Green Brick Partners, Brighthouse Financial, Ensco, General Motors, Exela Technologies, CONSOL Coal Resources, and Altus USA.

Greenlight Capital lowered its stake in Apple by 6.2 percent to 8.6 million shares during the fourth quarter of 2014, after Apple shares appreciated 15 percent in the year.

== Philanthropy ==
In 2009, Greenlight Capital donated $7.2 million to three charities: Tomorrows Children's Fund, the Center for Public Integrity (CPI) and the Project on Government Oversight (POGO). The Tomorrows Children's Fund received $2.6 million, CPI received $1.8 million, and POGO received $1.8 million.

== Political contributions ==
In 2012, Greenlight Capital ranked 5th out of WNYC's top 10 hedge fund political donors. The hedge fund contributed $592,729.88 to New York State political campaigns in 2012.

== Lawsuit with an ex-employee ==
In October 2023, a former employee at Greenlight Capital, James Fishback, sued the hedge fund in a row over his job title. In the suit, Fishback claimed he worked as “head of macro” at the New York hedge fund, but Greenlight Capital claims that position never existed. The controversy was covered in various news outlets.

Fishback claimed that in the two-and-a-half years he worked at Greenlight Capital, he was promoted twice; first from research analyst to trader and then to head of macro. Greenlight says these claims are false; it stated that the firm decided in 2023 to terminate Fishback due to low productivity but he resigned when he anticipated being let go.

On June 25, 2024, Greenlight Capital filed a countersuit, claiming Fishback violated his employment agreement, defamed Greenlight and engaged in unfair competition.

In September 2025, the dispute was resolved when Fishback admitted to sharing confidential information and acknowledged violating his employment terms by emailing Greenlight’s positions and strategies to a personal account and maintaining an undisclosed trading account. As part of the settlement, he agreed to return or delete all Greenlight information in his possession and pay the firm’s legal fees and costs.
