= Sigma Delta Tau =

American collegiate sorority

- ΣΔΤ
- Founded: March 25, 1917; 109 years ago Cornell University
- Type: Social
- Affiliation: NPC
- Status: Active
- Scope: National with International Affiliates
- Motto: Patriae Multae Spes Una "One Hope of Many People"
- Colors: Café_au Lait and Old Blue
- Symbol: Torch
- Flower: Golden Tea Rose
- Jewel: Lapis lazuli
- Publication: The Torch
- Philanthropy: Prevent Child Abuse America, SDT Foundation, Jewish Women International
- Chapters: 105
- Members: 70,000+ lifetime
- Headquarters: 714 Adams Street; Carmel, Indiana 46032; United States
- Website: sigmadeltatau.org

Sigma Delta Tau (ΣΔΤ) is an American sorority and member of the National Panhellenic Conference. Sigma Delta Tau was founded on March 25, 1917, at Cornell University by Jewish women. However, there is no religious requirement for membership to the sorority. Sigma Delta Tau has over 70,000 initiates from 105 chapters around the United States. It is a member of the National Panhellenic Conference.

== History ==
Sigma Delta Tau was founded on March 25, 1917, at Cornell University by seven Jewish women. Its founders were students Dora Bloom Turteltaub, Amy Apfel Tishman, Marian Gerber Greenberg, Grace Srenco Grossman, Inez Dane Ross, Regene Freund Cohane and Lenore Rubinow. The original name, Sigma Delta Phi, was changed after the women discovered a sorority with the same name already existed.

The sorority was formed as a local organization, with no plans for expansion. However, a second chapter was formed at the University of Pennsylvania in 1920, followed by a chapter at Ohio State University in 1921. By 1930, Sigma Delta Tau had chartered ten chapters and had initiated 540 members. It also had established alumnae chapters in Baton Rouge, Louisiana; Chicago, Illinois; Cincinnati, Ohio; Columbus, Ohio; New York City; and Philadelphia, Pennsylvania.

The sorority is governed by an executive council that is elected at a biennial convention.

There is no religious requirement for membership to the sorority, and it prides itself on being inclusive of all, as well as being historically Jewish. Sigma Delta Tau has over 70,000 initiates from 105 chapters around the United States. Its headquarters is in Carmel, Indiana.

== Symbols ==
Sigma Delta Tau's motto is Patriae Multae Spes Una or "one Hope of Many People". The colors of Sigma Delta Tau are cafe au lait and old blue. The sorority's symbol is the torch. Its flower is the golden tea rose. Its jewel is lapis lazuli.

The Sigma Delta Tau badge is a jeweled gold torch with Greek letters ΣΔΤ, with six pearls, and a diamond on the flame. The new member pin is round with a background of blue enamel with a gold torch enameled in old blue.

Its publication, The Torch, was established in 1922.

== Philanthropy ==
The current national philanthropies of Sigma Delta Tau are Prevent Child Abuse America, the Sigma Delta Tau Foundation, and Jewish Women International.

Prevent Child Abuse America was selected as Sigma Delta Tau's National Philanthropy in 1982. Each Sigma Delta Tau chapter conducts an annual service project, educational program or major fund raiser for the benefit of Prevent Child Abuse America. Since 1982, Sigma Delta Tau has donated more than $3 million to PCAA.

The Sigma Delta Tau Foundation was chosen as an official philanthropic partner in 2017.

== Chapters ==
Sigma Delta Tau currently has 64 active collegiate chapters across North America.

== Governance ==
The national president of Sigma Delta Tau is voted on by the chapters and National Council Members every two years.

== Notable members ==
- Lucia Aniello (Gamma Tau, Columbia University) – film director, writer, producer, and 4 time Emmy Award winner
- Joyce Brothers (Alpha chapter, Cornell University) – psychologist, television and radio personality, writer
- Arielle Charnas (Omega chapter, Syracuse University) – influencer and creative director of SomethingNavy
- Meredith Deane (Alpha Xi chapter, Boston University; Mu chapter, University of Southern California) – actress
- Heather Dubrow (Omega chapter, Syracuse University) – actress and cast member of The Real Housewives of Orange County
- Sherry Lansing (Sigma chapter, Northwestern University) – actress, CEO of Paramount Pictures, president of production at 20th Century Fox
- Bari Lurie (Alpha Tau chapter, George Washington University) – non-profit executive
- Christy Carlson Romano – (Gamma Tau chapter, Columbia University/Barnard College) – Broadway and television actress
- Carol Saline (Omega chapter, Syracuse University) – journalist, broadcaster, and award-winning author
- Flo Steinberg (Psi chapter, University of Massachusetts Amherst) – publisher
- Ginnie Sebastian Storage (University of Virginia) – President General of the Daughters of the American Revolution
- Allee Willis (Alpha Nu chapter, University of Wisconsin) – Grammy Award-winning songwriter, art director
- Remy Zaken (Gamma Tau chapter, Columbia University/Barnard College) – Broadway actress

== See also ==
- List of social sororities and women's fraternities
- List of Jewish fraternities and sororities
