= Wilhelm Knechtel =

German gardener and botanist (1837–1924)

Wilhelm Knechtel (Spanish: Guillermo Knechtel; 13 August 1837 – 22 October 1924) was an ethnic German Austrian-Romanian gardener and botanist.

Born in Bohemia in a village called Pihel, now belonging to Nový Bor, Knechtel worked in Prague, then entered into the service of Archduke Maximilian in 1860 at Miramare Castle in Trieste, Italy. When the Archduke was crowned Emperor of Mexico, Wilhelm accompanied him and designed various gardens in Mexico City, including the roof garden in Chapultepec Castle.

After Maximilian's incarceration in June 1867, he briefly served in Lacroma (a small island in the Adriatic Sea), before going into the service of Domnitor, later King Carol I of Romania, as Director of Gardens and Professor of Botany at the Bucharest School of Agriculture. He was knighted Cavaler al Ordinului Coroanei României (Knight of the Order of the Romanian Crown) by Carol I on 17 January 1883.

Besides his botanical work, Knechtel also served as a professor of German, Czech, Latin, Italian, Spanish and Romanian.

He died on 22 October 1924 in Bucharest, and he was later buried in Bucharest's Lutheran cemetery.

== Bibliography ==
- Handschriftliche Aufzeichnungen meiner persönlichen Eindrücke und Erlebnisse in Mexiko in den Jahren 1864-1867 / Memorias del jardinero de Maximiliano de México (Written notes of my personal impressions and experiences in Mexico in the years between 1864-1867 / Memoires of the gardener to Maximilian of Mexico). Translation by Susanne Igler, Prologue by Amparo Gómez Tepexicuapan, Edition by Jean-Gerard Sidaner. To be published in Mexico City by the National Museum of History, Castillo de Chapultepec, Mexico (2000/2001). German original published in approx. 1905 by Karl Bellmann (Prague).
- Gómez Tepexicuapan, Amparo: "Los jardines de Chapultepec en el siglo XIX". in: Arqueología mexicana Vol. x, 57 (Sept.-Oct. 2002). S. 48–53.
- Consejo Nacional para la Cultura y las Artes. "Traducción al español del jardinero de Maximiliano". in: La Cultura, Sala de Prensa. 15.01.2001.
- Igler, Susanne. "'México es el México que yo invento' -La percepción europea de México en la época de la Intervención Francesa: las Memorias manuscritas del jardinero imperial Wilhelm Knechtel". (Actas del III Congreso Internacional Alexander von Humboldt).
