= Lason =

Provider of document management outsourcing services

Lason, Inc.
- Company type: Subsidiary
- Industry: Business process outsourcing
- Founded: 1985
- Defunct: February 2007
- Fate: Acquired
- Headquarters: Troy, Michigan
- Parent: HOV Services
- Website: www.lason.com

Lason is a provider of document management outsourcing services, including imaging, mail processing, data capture, document DNATM, and output. Lason has 35+ North American offices, with facilities in Mexico, China, and India which provide data and document-intensive organizations. Client control centers located in Troy, Michigan and Toronto, Ontario provide clients with North American-based, English-speaking management.

Lason's blue-chip customer base includes many of the Fortune 1000, and spans several markets, including healthcare, insurance, financial services, electronic publishing, and government. The company was listed at number 19 on The Global Outsourcing 100 list by the International Association of Outsourcing Professionals.
