= Volker Oppitz (footballer) =

German footballer

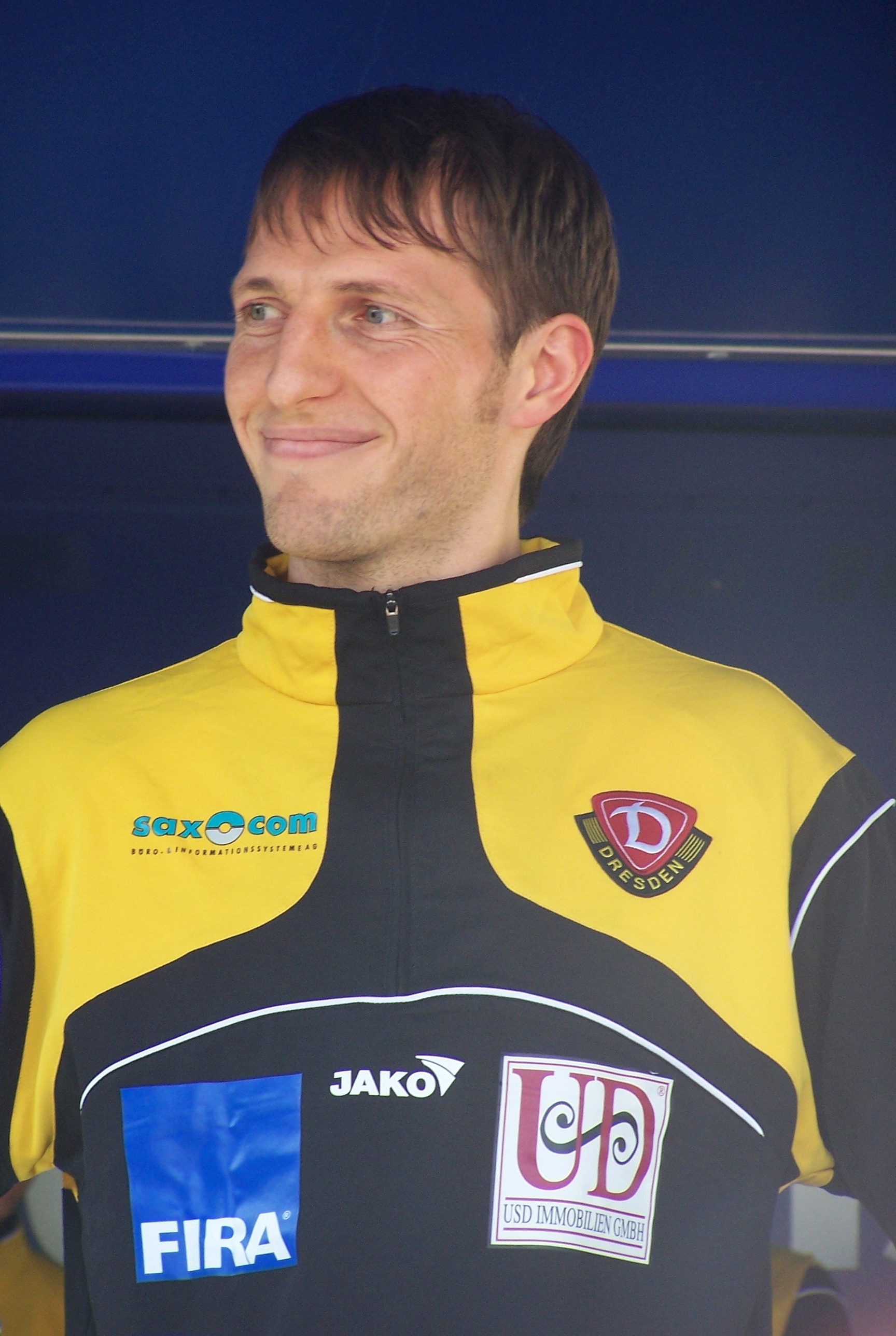

Personal information
- Date of birth: 16 February 1978 (age 48)
- Place of birth: Dresden, East Germany
- Height: 1.89 m (6 ft 2 1/2 in)
- Position: Centre-back

Youth career
- 1984–1996: Dynamo Dresden

Senior career*
Years	Team	Apps	(Gls)
1996–2001	Dynamo Dresden II	73	(0)
1998–1999	→ Heidenauer SV (loan)	30	(0)
2001–2010	Dynamo Dresden	226	(6)
Total		329	(6)
- * Club domestic league appearances and goals

Volker Oppitz (born 16 February 1978) is a German former footballer who played as a defender for Dynamo Dresden, where he also worked as managing director.

== Career ==
He broke into the Dynamo first-team in 2001 after the club had been relegated to the Oberliga, and has been a first-team regular ever since, through two promotions and one relegation. Oppitz suffered with injury towards the end of his career, and was forced to retire in June 2010, at which point Dynamo appointed him as managing director on an interim basis.

== Personal life ==
His father Volker, is honorary chairman of Dynamo Dresden.
