= Volker Oppitz (scientist) =

German economist and mathematician (born 1931)

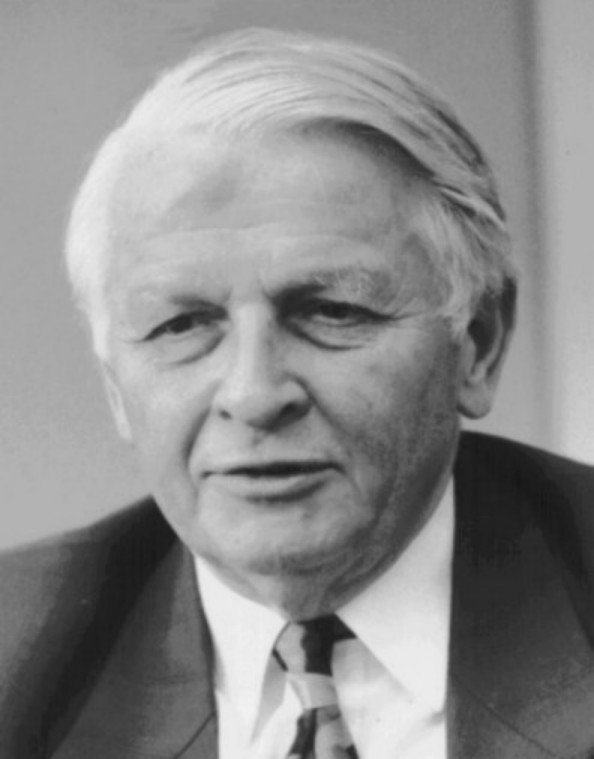
Volker Oppitz

Volker Oppitz (born 6 December 1931 in Nový Bor (Haida), Czechoslovakia) is a German economist and mathematician.

== Life ==
Oppitz graduated in 1950 from the Deutsche Müllerschule Dippoldiswalde (DMD), in 1952 from the School of Engineering Dippoldiswalde in mechanical and electrical engineering and in 1956 in economics at the Dresden University of Technology. In 1970 he earned his Ph.D. (Dr. rer. oec.) in the field of economics of industrial sectors at the Dresden University of Technology. In 1971 he became Assistant Professor at the Dresden University of Technology in Faculty of Economics. After making his habilitation treatise (Dr. habil.) in 1981 at the University of Rostock he became in 1987 Associate Professor in the Faculty of Economics of the Dresden University of Technology. In 1990 he was appointed to full professor and head of the Department of Management, Operations Research and Operations management. In 1996 he retired and was still working as Professor emeritus.

Since 1992 Oppitz was CEO of UBI Wirtschaftsberatung GmbH in Dresden. Since 2001 he is academic director in sports management at the Europäisches Institut für postgraduale Bildung (EIPOS) at Dresden University of Technology in association with the Deutscher Olympischer Sportbund. He lectures on the application of mathematics and statistics in management at EIPOS in Dresden.

In addition to his scientific work Volker Oppitz was between 2002 and 2005 Vice President of the German football club Dynamo Dresden, and since 2005 has been honorary chairman. His son, also named Volker, is a player for the club.

== Work ==
Oppitz deals mainly with draft mathematical models and their practical use. He pays special attention to the synthesis of mathematics and economics and practical solutions to the economic problems of corporate practice. Even the most difficult of financial models follow after his scientific explanation of the purpose, in its everyday use to maximize profits and minimize costs. The research activity of Prof. Oppitz includes company management and economics, management of planning and organization of economics, management processes and engineering management, economic modelling, particularly in financial/budgetary maths, risk management, and forecasting methods.

Oppitz has published over 200 scientific publications, including more than 20 books and papers, numerous articles in journals, on patents and property rights.

== Publications ==
- Taschenbuch Wirtschaftlichkeitsrechnung, Carl Hanser Verlag 2003 mit Prof. Dr. Volker Nollau
- OR_MAT© Wirtschaftsmathematik, TGS-Dresden 2000
- Gabler Lexikon Wirtschaftlichkeitsberechnung, Gabler-Verlag 1995
- Veredlung von Material und Erzeugnissen: dargest. an Erzeugnissen d. Elektrotechnik/Elektronik, Inst. für Rationalisierung d. Elektrotechnik/Elektronik, Institutsteil Dresden, Zentralstelle für Aus- u. Weiterbildung d. Industriebereiches Elektrotechnik/Elektronik 1985, mit Klaus Kleinert
- Produktionskontinuität als komplexe Leitungsaufgabe IR Dresden, ZSB 1984
- Produktionsorganisation: Ziele und Kriterien der Produktionsorganisation 1984
- Vervollkommnung der Fertigungsplanung und Fertigungssteuerung IR Dresden, ZSB 1983
- Neue Erzeugnisse: Gebrauchswert, Bedarf, Aufwand Beitrag zur Anwendung ökonom.-math. Bewertungsmethoden bei der Entwicklung neuer Erzeugnisse, Verlag Die Wirtschaft Berlin 1983, mit Werner Weichelt
- Planung, Steuerung und Kontinuität der Fertigung, Verlag Die Wirtschaft Berlin 1983, mit Winfried Lukas
- Kontinuität der Fertigung durch Vervollkommung ihrer Planung und Steuerung Universität Rostock Fakultät für Gesellschaftswissenschaften (Habilitationsschrift) 1981
- Muster eines Fallspieles Institut für Fachschulwesen 1970 mit E. Oppitz
- Die Organisation industrieller Subsysteme, das Grundfonds- und Kapazitätswachstum komplexer industrieller Subsysteme unter Berücksichtigung qualitativer Einflüsse : T. 1-3 TUD/Eigenverlag 1970, mit Josef Balling, Hans-Joachim Grüneberger
- Zur mathematisch begründeten Modellierung der prognostischen Entscheidungsvorbereitung in der Forschung und Entwicklung, Institut f. Rationalisierung u. Organisation d. Elektroindustrie Dresden 1968, mit Günter Meinke, Heinz Neumann
- Betrachtungen zum Aufbau von mathematisch begründeten Prognosemodellen, Institut für Rationalisierung und Organisation der Elektroindustrie, Dresden 1967
- Planübung zur rechnergestützten Vorbereitung der Planaufgaben für ein neues Erzeugnis : ökonomisch-mathematische Grundlagen für die langfristige Bedarfsermittlung bei industriellen Konsumgütern TU Dresden, Institut für Sozialistische Wirtschaftsführung 1967
