= Enterprise information management =

Enterprise information management (EIM) is a business discipline specializing in providing solutions for optimal use of information within organizations, for instance to support decision-making processes or day-to-day operations that require the availability of knowledge. EIM aims to overcome traditional/legacy IT-related barriers to managing information at an enterprise level. The International Organization for Standardization (ISO) recognises information management as a separate function to information technology (IT/ICT).

Enterprise Information Management practices are guided by the suite of ISO Standards that are managed by ISO Technical Committee 46 (ISO/TC 46).

EIM combines enterprise content management (ECM), business process management (BPM), customer experience management (CEM), recordkeeping and records management, information management, and business intelligence (BI). Whereas BI and ECM focus on the management of structured and unstructured information respectively, EIM does not make this distinction but approaches the management of information from the perspective of the whole enterprise.

== See also ==
- Enterprise output management
- Master data management
