= List of people from Manhattan Beach, California =

This is a list of notable people who are from or have lived in Manhattan Beach, California.

== Entertainment ==
- Erin Andrews: TV sports reporter and co-host of Dancing with the Stars
- Vanessa Baden: actress (Kenan & Kel)
- Brad Bird: director (The Incredibles, Ratatouille)
- Rachel Bloom: comedian, actress, singer
- Jenn Brown: ESPN reporter
- Dave Coulier: actor, comedian (Full House, Fuller House)
- Colin Cowherd: host of Fox Sports Talk show The Herd
- Alan B. Curtiss: assistant director and film producer (Master and Commander)
- Zooey Deschanel: actress (New Girl)
- Don Dokken: founder/lead singer of 1980s heavy metal band Dokken
- Jane Elliot: actress (General Hospital, Days of Our Lives)
- June Fairchild: actress
- Matthew Fox: actor (Lost, Party of Five)
- Scott Gurney: TV producer (Duck Dynasty)
- John Ireland: play-by-play broadcaster for Los Angeles Lakers and radio personality
- Neal Israel: director of Surf Ninjas and falconer
- Andre Jacquemetton: Emmy-winning producer (Mad Men)
- Kelly Kelly: actress, model and professional wrestler (born in Florida) (WAGS, Disturbing the Peace)
- Wally Kurth: actor (General Hospital, Days of Our Lives)
- Peyton Elizabeth Lee: actress (Andi Mack)
- Jim Lindberg: singer of the South Bay punk rock band Pennywise
- Ben McKenzie: actor (The O.C., Southland, Gotham)
- Kristen Miller: actress (She Spies)
- Marisa Miller: Sports Illustrated swimsuit issue cover model
- Kevin Nealon: actor/comedian, Saturday Night Live
- Harold Peary: radio, television and movie actor; named Manhattan Beach's honorary mayor in 1956
- Liz Phair: singer/songwriter and guitarist
- Teri Polo: actress (Meet the Parents, Meet the Fockers)
- Redfoo: lead singer of LMFAO
- Tara Reid: actress and model (Sharknado series)
- J.D. Roth: reality TV host (Endurance)
- Maria Sansone: television personality and host (Good Day LA)
- Ben Sharples: actor (7500)
- Cody Simpson: Australian singer/musician
- Bob Thaves: cartoonist
- Max Thieriot: actor (SEAL Team)
- Vince Vaughn: actor
- Scott Whyte: actor (City Guys)
- Owen Wilson: actor
- Amanda Wyss: actress (A Nightmare on Elm Street, Fast Times at Ridgemont High, The Id, The Sandman)

== Journalists and writers ==
- Emily D. Baker: legal commentator, host of the podcast "The Emily Show".
- Jordan Belfort: author of The Wolf of Wall Street
- John Bollinger: financial author, developer of the Bollinger Bands analysis method
- Richard Foss: journalist and science fiction writer
- Trace Gallagher: anchor and correspondent, Fox News Channel
- Thomas Pynchon: novelist, The Crying of Lot 49, Gravity's Rainbow
- Ryen Russillo: Ringer podcast and television writer
- Michele Tafoya: sportscaster

== Athletes ==
Basketball

- Matt Barnes: Los Angeles Clippers player
- Jeanie Buss: executive vice president and co-owner, L.A. Lakers
- Brian Cook: forward for the Los Angeles Clippers
- Mike D'Antoni: head coach of the Houston Rockets
- Robbie Davis: Lakers team trainer
- Andy Enfield: head basketball coach for USC
- Devean George: former NBA player
- Blake Griffin: forward for the Los Angeles Clippers
- Shaun Livingston: point guard for the Golden State Warriors
- Slava Medvedenko: basketball player, former power forward for the Los Angeles Lakers
- Chris Mihm: former center for the Los Angeles Lakers
- Steve Nash: former NBA superstar player
- Michael Olowokandi: former NBA player
- Kurt Rambis: NBA player and coach
- Željko Rebrača: former center for the Los Angeles Clippers
- Brian Shaw: former NBA player and coach of the Denver Nuggets
- Diana Taurasi: basketball player, five-time Olympic gold medalist, three-time NCCA champion, and three-time WNBA champion
- Sasha Vujačić: shooting guard for the Brooklyn Nets
- Luke Walton: former head coach of the L.A. Lakers

Football

- Tim Brown: 1987 Heisman Trophy winner and NFL Hall of Famer
- Pete Carroll: head coach of the Seattle Seahawks
- Norm Chow: former University of Hawaii head football coach
- Jeff Garcia: former NFL quarterback
- Tony Gonzalez: former tight end for the Atlanta Falcons
- Matt Leinart: Heisman Trophy winner, former USC and NFL quarterback, broadcaster
- Jim Mora: former UCLA head football coach
- Don Mosebar: played for the Los Angeles Raiders for 13 years
- Rick Neuheisel: former Colorado, Washington, and UCLA head football coach; PAC-12 network broadcaster
- Ken O'Brien: former quarterback for the NY Jets
- Josh Rosen: quarterback for Arizona Cardinals
- Michael Strahan: television personality, former defensive end for the New York Giants

Baseball

- Nomar Garciaparra: MLB shortstop, television broadcaster
- Eric Karros: former MLB first baseman, television broadcaster
- Jason Kendall: former MLB catcher
- Paul LoDuca: former MLB catcher
- Don Mattingly: manager of the Los Angeles Dodgers and former New York Yankees player

Soccer

- Bruce Arena: head coach of the L.A. Galaxy
- Bob Bradley: former head coach of the US Men's National Soccer Team
- Landon Donovan: player for the Los Angeles Galaxy, U.S. National Team forward
- Omar Gonzalez: player for the Los Angeles Galaxy
- Mia Hamm: former soccer player, two-time Olympic gold medalist, World Cup Cup winner
- Cobi Jones: player for the Los Angeles Galaxy

Hockey

- Rob Blake: former defenseman and current executive for the Los Angeles Kings
- Dustin Brown: right winger for the L.A. Kings; given key to the city by Mayor Wayne Powell
- Marc Crawford: former head coach for the Los Angeles Kings
- Pavol Demitra: forward for the Minnesota Wild
- Jason Doig: former NHL defenseman
- Nelson Emerson: former NHL right winger; head of development for the Los Angeles Kings
- Alexander Frolov: hockey player for the Los Angeles Kings
- Marián Gáborík: former forward for the Los Angeles Kings
- Tim Gleason: defenseman for the Carolina Hurricanes
- Ron Hextall: former goaltender for the Philadelphia Flyers; former GM for the Flyers
- Anže Kopitar: captain, center and Western Conference all-star for the Los Angeles Kings
- Dean Lombardi: president and CEO of L.A. Kings
- Glen Murray: former right winger for the Boston Bruins
- Jonathan Quick: goaltender for the Los Angeles Kings
- Mike Richards: center for the Los Angeles Kings
- Luc Robitaille: president and CEO, L.A. Kings; former hockey star
- Mathieu Schneider: former NHL hockey player
- John Stevens: head coach of the Los Angeles Kings
- Jack St. Ivany, defenseman for the Pittsburgh Penguins
- Darryl Sutter: former head coach of the Los Angeles Kings
- Ľubomír Višňovský: former defenseman for the Los Angeles Kings

Volleyball

- Kerri Walsh Jennings: three-time Olympic beach volleyball player; given key to the city by Mayor Wayne Powell
- Alix Klineman (born 1989): volleyball player
- Mike Lambert: former professional beach volleyball player
- Stein Metzger: former professional beach volleyball player

Other sports

- Victoria Azarenka: professional tennis player
- Isabelle Connor: Olympic rhythmic gymnast
- Maria Sharapova: professional tennis player, Olympic silver medalist; given key to the city by Mayor Wayne Powell
- Pearl Sinn: former LPGA golfer
- Rebecca Soni: five-time Olympic gold medalist swimmer and world record holder; given key to city by Mayor Wayne Powell
- Wally Wolf (1930–1997): swimmer, water polo player, and Olympic champion

== Business people ==
- The McMartin family: operators of a preschool in the city, charged with sexual abuse of children during the Satanic panic. Charges were dropped after a lengthy investigation and trial.
