= Pellea =

Pellea is a Romanian surname. Notable people with the surname include:

- Amza Pellea (1931–1983), Romanian actor
- Oana Pellea (born 1962), Romanian actor, daughter of Amza

== See also ==
- Peller
