= Funi Raccoon Game =

2026 video game

- Developer: The Crayon Eating Company
- Publisher: The Crayon Eating Company
- Platforms: Linux; Windows; Nintendo Switch; Nintendo Switch 2
- Release: Linux, Windows; 13 March 2026; Switch, Switch 2; 2 October 2026
- Genres: 3D platformer, adventure
- Mode: Single-player

Funi Raccoon Game is an Irish 2026 collect-a-thon platformer developed and published by the Crayon Eating Company. It follows a raccoon who has just recently purchased a dumpster and seeks to decorate their new home by traveling to various locations and gathering objects to place around the dumpster.

== Plot ==
After purchasing a dumpster to live in, the raccoon explores the city of Norwich, collecting any and all objects they can pick up to furnish their home. The Four Dimensional Hypercube, an intelligent computer and friend to the raccoon, opens portals to more locations as more items have been collected. One unlocked location is Beenie HQ, a factory that produces plush toys of their mascot Beenie the Birthday Boy. The raccoon may take over the factory, overthrowing the evil corporation that runs it and changing the factory to produce raccoon plushes instead. The other location to be unlocked is the Blimbo Cluster which contains Blimbo Village, and Blimbo City, the settlements of the Blimbos, who are various objects with faces.

The raccoon is then tasked by the Four Dimensional Hypercube to take the cooling rod from the nuclear reactor in Blimbo City. Removing it triggers a nuclear meltdown and subsequent apocalypse. The raccoon continues to collect items in the wasteland, needing to collect two more cooling rods to cross a bridge in the Gully, a location they are told they can fix their mess.

All endings start in the Gully. In one the raccoon starts and bolsters a cult centred around Beenie the Birthday Boy, and serves to become the new Beenie in order to resurrect him. In another, it is revealed the Four Dimensional Hypercube is British, and all the items they had been collecting were to open her museum, causing the raccoon to fall to the ground, distraught. Another ending has the raccoon buy an orb that results in their death, an unknown entity saying they should have helped someone if they wanted a better ending. The last of the endings requires the raccoon to have brought specific items to Lugh the Sun God in each of the previous locations. Lugh reveals the Four Dimensional Hypercube is British, then teaming up with the raccoon to defeat her.

== Gameplay ==
Gameplay screenshot

The game has an open world in which players can move and jump in order to collect and store objects placed in various interconnected locations. Connected areas can be found through exploration and simple puzzles, and new disconnected locations can be accessed by collecting enough unique items.

== Release and reception ==
Funi Raccoon Game Released on 13 March 2026 on Steam for Windows and Linux. The game received very positive reviews following release, saying it has a collage-like aesthetic and comparing it to Windows 95, although stating the controls can be tricky for some players. Jake Boyette in his review for Fix Gaming, gave it a score of 9/10, writing "Funi Raccoon Game is a truly unique 3D platformer." Chris Person for Aftermath writes "It is a game that not only does not hide its seams but makes a tapestry out of them. It is the shorter game with worse graphics that people claim they want. The result is indeed “Funi.”"

Ports for Nintendo Switch and Nintendo Switch 2 released on 2 October 2026.
