= 2025 Streamer Awards =

Awards ceremony in Los Angeles

- Awarded for: Excellence in live streaming
- Sponsored by: AT&T; HyperX; Omen; bbyes$; broke; Lunar Client; Slingshot; Marvel Rivals; TVU Networks Corporation
- Date: December 6, 2025
- Venue: Wiltern Theatre; Los Angeles, California
- Hosted by: QTCinderella; Maya
- Preshow hosts: KatieB; Sketch
- Acts: Good Kid; Ironmouse; MarcoMeatball; Ty Dolla Sign

Highlights
- Most awards: Kai Cenat (4)
- Most nominations: Kai Cenat (5)
- Streamer of the Year: IShowSpeed
- Gamer of the Year: CaseOh
- Legacy Award: Doublelift
- League of their Own: Maya Higa
- The Sapphire Award: Cinna

Streaming coverage
- Network: Twitch & YouTube
- Runtime: 430 minutes
- Viewership: 1,028,321 peak viewers
- Produced by: QTCinderella; Michael W. Kiaunis Jr.
- Directed by: Tom Sullivan

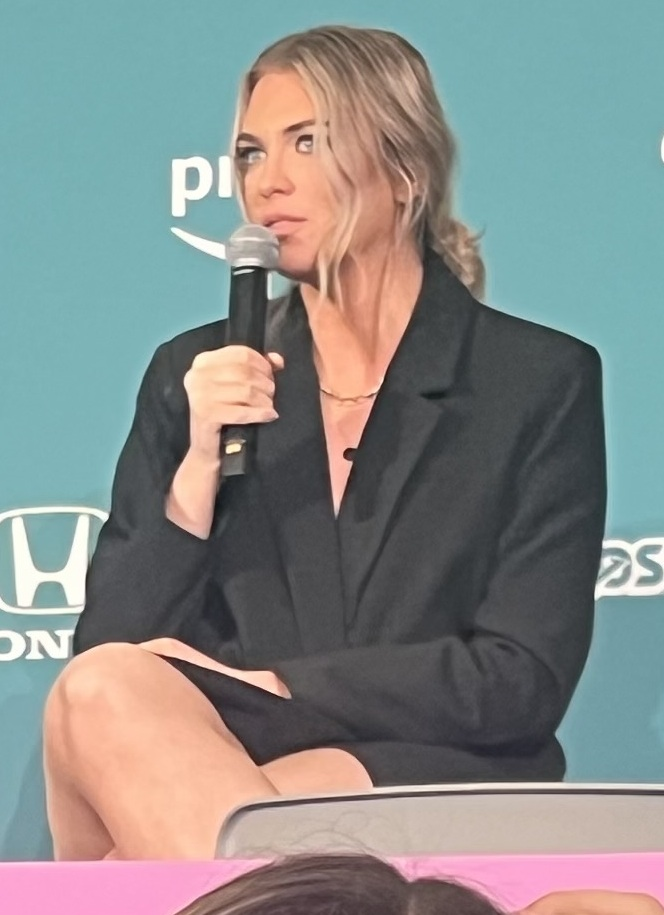
QTCinderella hosted the show.

The 2025 Streamer Awards (also referred to as The 5th Annual Streamer Awards) was the fifth edition of the annual Streamer Awards, honoring the best in live streaming in 2025. The ceremony was held on December 6, 2025, at the Wiltern Theatre in Los Angeles, California and was hosted by QTCinderella and Maya Higa.

The red carpet was hosted by Sketch, KatieB and Stable Ronaldo. A fashion panel was hosted by Biqtch Puddin', Godoy and Rock M. Sakura. A Spanish co-stream was hosted by Quackity, with FanFan serving as the event's floor host. Prezoh and JHBTeam served as backstage hosts. Their interviews with the winners would be posted to Prezoh's YouTube channel and streamed on QTCinderella's Twitch channel.

Nominations opened on October 25 and closed on November 8. The nominees were announced on QTCinderella's Twitch stream and voting opened on November 16. Before voting closed on November 29, QTCinderella revealed that 1,090,358 people had voted as of November 25.

For this edition, five categories were added (Best Brand Partner, Best Marvel Rivals Streamer, Best Reality Streamer, Best Vertical Live Streamer, Best Stream Duo) and two categories were added back from previous editions (Best Music Streamer & Best Minecraft Streamer)

Nominations were reworked for this edition, with streamers only being able to be nominated in their two categories with the highest nomination. This rule does not apply to major categories, such as Streamer of the Year or Legacy Award.

In response to security incidents involving livestreamers earlier in the year, such as an assault against Emiru at TwitchCon, QTCinderella described security at the event as "aggressive" compared to other events.

== Performers ==
The 2025 Streamer Awards featured performances from:

Artist(s)	Song(s)
Good Kid	"Wall"; "Eastside"
Ironmouse & MarcoMeatball	"We All Lift Together" (Warframe cover); "Lullaby of the Manifold" (Warframe cover)
Ty Dolla $ign	"Twitch"; "Speed" (DDG cover) (with DDG); "Don't Kill the Party"

== Presenters ==
The ceremony featured 33 award presenters during the main show. Katie B and Sketch presented the awards for Best Stream Game, Best International Streamer, Best MOBA Streamer and Best MMORPG Streamer during the pre-show. (Note: Biqtch Puddin' and Rock M. Sakura joined to present Best MOBA Streamer and Best MMORPG Streamer.)

- Supertf – presented Best Fighting Game Streamer
- Katie B – presented Best Sports Streamer
- Pokimane – presented Best Streamed Series
- Esfand – presented Best Roleplay Streamer
- Stable Ronaldo – presented Best FPS Streamer
- Cringechin – presented the Hidden Gem Award
- Zoil – presented Best Content Organization
- Sweet Anita – presented Best Creative Arts Streamer
- Myth – presented Best Battle Royale Streamer
- Deshaefrost – presented Best Streamed Collab
- Bonnie – presented Best Marvel Rivals Streamer
- Simply – presented Best Speedrun Streamer
- Jack Manifold – presented Best Minecraft Streamer
- Arky – presented Best Marathon Streamer
- Samwitch – presented Best Variety Streamer
- Jakenbake – presented Best IRL Streamer
- Ethan Nestor – presented Best Music Streamer
- Jake Webber – presented Best Streamed Series
- Cutebot – presented Best VTuber
- AustinShow – presented Best Reality Streamer
- Annie Fuchsia – presented Best Just Chatting Streamer
- Tara Yummy – presented Best Vertical Live Streamer
- BigBossBoze – presented Best Strategy Game Streamer
- CDawgVA – presented the League of their Own Award
- NiceWigg – presented Best Breakout Streamer
- PeachJars & Cyr – presented Best Stream Duo
- Maya Higa – presented the Streamers Choice Award
- Quackity – presented the Rising Star Award
- QTCinderella – presented the Legacy Award
- Valkyrae – presented the Sapphire Award
- Alana Pierce – presented Gamer of the Year
- ImDontai – presented Streamer of the Year

== Winners and nominees ==
Streamers were nominated and voted for by their fans, besides the Legacy Award and the Streamer's Streamer Award, which were voted on by the Streamer Awards panel and audience respectively.

Winners are listed first and in boldface.

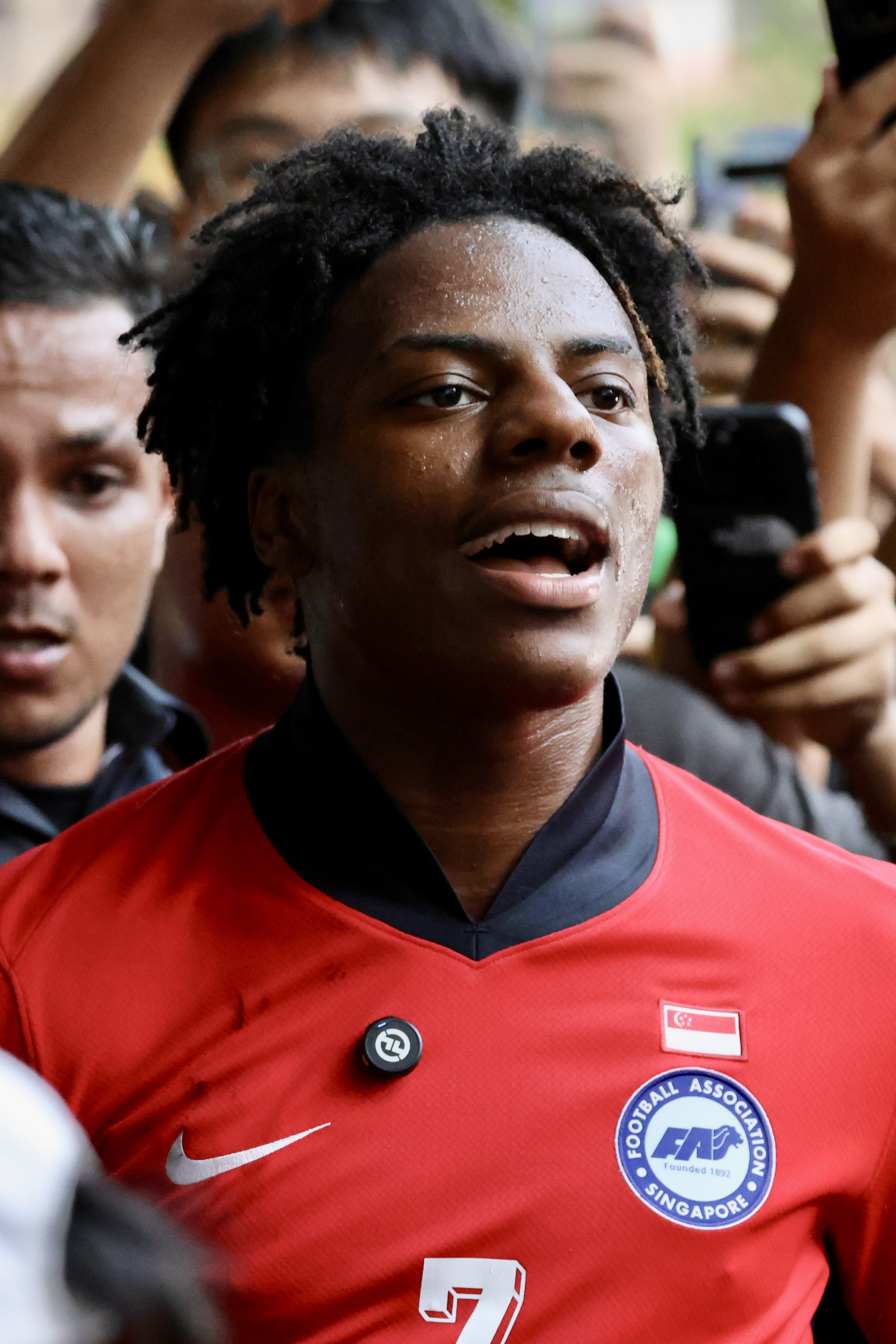
IShowSpeed, winner of the Streamer of the Year award.

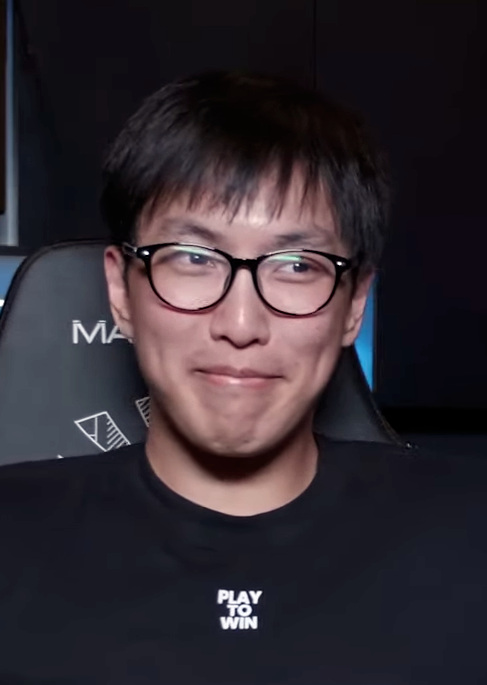
Doublelift, winner of the Legacy award

**Best Music Streamer (Presented by broke)**: **PlaqueBoyMax**; AriAtHome; DDG; Kaysan; Kriss_Drummer	Best Creative Arts Streamer (Presented by bbno$): **Emiru**; DizzyKitten; BarleyTheBurr; iGumdrop; RoseDoodle
**Best Roleplay Streamer**: **Fanum**; Kaysan; LegendsofAvantris; OfficerMesser; Lord_Kebun	**Best MOBA Streamer**: **Caedrel**; KeshaEUW; KNekro; Nix
**Best Brand Partner**: **Red Bull**; AT&T; Cash App; Gamer Supps	**Hidden Gem Award (Presented by Omen and HyperX)**: **ijustlovepuzzles**; broxh_; dragtrashly; sinaheh; Moohoodles
**Best Battle Royale Streamer**: **Clix**; AussieAntics; Faide; Ninja; RealKatieB	**Best Fighting Game Streamer**: **LilyPichu**; brawlpro; Eskay; Sajam
**Best MMORPG Streamer**: **Sodapoppin**; AnnieFuchsia; PikabooIRL; Xaryu	**Best Speedrun Streamer**: **LilAggy**; BlueSR; Pezzzy; Zfg1
**Best Sports Streamer**: **Flight23white**; Angryginge13; CashNastyGaming; JankyRondo; RunTheFUTMarket	**Best Minecraft Streamer (Presented by Lunar Client)**: **Tubbo**; Couriway; Feinberg; GoodTimesWithScar; Pangi
**Best Marvel Rivals Streamer (Presented by Marvel Rivals)**: **Flats**; BigPuffer; Bogur; SuperTF; TimTheTatman	**Best FPS Streamer**: **TheBurntPeanut**; Aspen; Bijusan; ohnePixel
**Best Strategy Game Streamer**: **Jynxzi**; Northernlion; pChal; Roffle	**Best Reality Streamer**: **RayAsianBoy**; Adapt; DeshaeFrost; StableRonaldo; TheTylilShow
**Best IRL Streamer (Presented by TVU)**: **IShowSpeed**; Chloe__IRL; ChristinaandAmber; ExtraEmily	**Best Vertical Live Streamer**: **KreekCraft**; Lasstishen; MarcSebastianF; ThatZestyBestie
**Stream Game of the Year**: **Peak**; Clair Obscur: Expedition 33; Marvel Rivals; R.E.P.O.; Schedule I	**Best Content Organization**: **FaZe Clan**; AMP; Hololive; OSCS
**Best International Streamer**: **TotaaMC**; Anyme023; Loud_Coringa; Squeezie; Tumblurr	**Best Stream Duo**: **Agent00** **& ExtraEmily**; Arky & Yugi2x; CDawg & Ironmouse; JasonTheWeen & SakuraShymko; Lacy & Marlon
**Best Streamed Collab**: **Kai Cenat & LeBron James**; Cinna & Zelina Vega; PlaqueBoyMax & Fred Again; Pokimane & Katseye	**Best Marathon Stream**: **Mafiathon 3 - Kai Cenat**; FaZe Subathon - FaZe Clan; Speed does America - IShowSpeed; Stream for Humanity - AmineMaTue
**Best Streamed Event**: **Streamer University - Kai Cenat**; Bingo Brawlers - Captain_Domo; GP Explorer 3 - Squeezie; Streamer Games - Ludwig; Streamer Prom - FunnyMike	**Best Streamed Series**: **In the Booth - PlaqueBoyMax**; Alveus Tours - Maya; Caretakers - YourRageGaming; Fortnite Friday - ConnorEatsPants; Let Her Cook - Sydeon
**Best VTuber**: **TheBurntPeanut**; Chibidoki; Ironmouse; Kenji; Mori Calliope	**Best Variety Streamer**: **Caseoh_**; Agent00; Lirik; Squeex; Vinesauce
**Best Just Chatting Streamer**: **Kai Cenat**; JasonTheWeen; Joe_Bartolozzi; LydiaViolet; xQc	**Rising Star Award (Presented by Slingshot)**: **Marlon**; AverageHarry_; RealKatieB; Reginald; SakuraShymko
**Best Breakout Streamer**: **Adapt**; 2xrakai; DDG; Vanillamace; WendolynOrtizz	**League of Their Own**: **Maya**; StudyTme; ThePrimeagen; TheStockGuy
**The Sapphire Award**: **Cinna**; Emiru; ExtraEmily; Vanillamace; WendolynOrtizz	**Gamer of the Year**: **Caseoh_**; Jynxzi; ohnePixel; summit1g; TheBurntPeanut
**Streamer's Choice Award**: **JasonTheWeen**	**Legacy Award**: **Doublelift**
**Streamer of the Year**: **IShowSpeed**; ExtraEmily; JasonTheWeen; Kai Cenat; PlaqueBoyMax
