= Pelluer =

Pelluer is a surname. Notable people with the surname include:

- Scott Pelluer (1959–2023), American football player
- Steve Pelluer (b. 1962), American football player

== See also ==
- Peller
