= Jynxzi =

American Twitch streamer and YouTuber (born 2001)

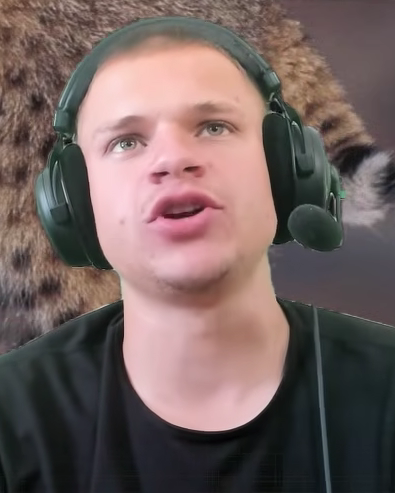
- Stewart in 2026
- Born: Nicholas Stewart; September 26, 2001 (age 25)
- Other name: Junko
- Occupations: Twitch streamer; YouTuber

Twitch information
- Channel: jynxzi
- Years active: 2019–present
- Genres: Gaming; Just Chatting
- Game: Tom Clancy's Rainbow Six Siege
- Followers: 11.3 million

YouTube information
- Channel: Jynxzi
- Years active: 2020–present
- Genre: Gaming
- Subscribers: 6.9 million
- Views: 2.7 billion
- Last updated: September 12, 2026

Nicholas Stewart (born September 26, 2001), better known online as Jynxzi (pronounced JINK-see), is an American Twitch streamer, YouTuber, and player of Tom Clancy's Rainbow Six Siege, an online tactical shooter game, and Clash Royale. He is the eighth most-subscribed Twitch streamer of all time. He was named "Best Breakthrough Streamer" and "Gamer of the Year" at the 2023 Streamer Awards, and later was named "Best FPS Streamer" at the 2024 Streamer Awards.

== Career ==
Stewart started streaming on Twitch in January 2019. Later, in September 2020, Stewart began publishing his content on YouTube, predominantly posting rage compilations and gameplay videos from the video game Tom Clancy's Rainbow Six: Siege.

Stewart began gaining popularity through the short-form content he posted on TikTok, which in turn brought more viewers to his Twitch streams. Hunter Cooke of Dot Esports described Stewart as "entertainment personified—the inner monologue that occurs when you die in a frustrating way or get a cheeky kill."

On March 10, 2022, Tom Clancy's Rainbow Six: Siege (in Y11 currently) announced on Twitter that Stewart will be receiving a streamer charm named Jynxzi, which is an in-game cosmetic that can be obtained by "subscribing to the respective streamer's Twitch channel with a linked Ubisoft account."

On March 31, 2023, Stewart joined Spacestation Gaming as their Tom Clancy's Rainbow Six: Siege content creator. On April 12, 2023, Stewart reached 1 million followers on Twitch. He also became the most-subscribed Twitch streamer globally, with 80,000 active subscribers, surpassing Kai Cenat and xQc. Stewart was the highest-paid Twitch streamer in 2023, with estimated monthly earnings of around $120,842 to $191,527. In December 2023, Stewart signed with talent management company and creative agency Right Click Culture.

On February 17, 2024, Stewart won the "Best Breakthrough Streamer" and "Gamer of the Year" awards at the 2023 Streamer Awards. He was also nominated for "Streamer of the Year" at the same ceremony. Stewart was the number one Twitch streamer based on hours watched for the month of February 2024. In March 2024, Ubisoft added an entire in-game bundle containing Jynxzi-themed cosmetics to Tom Clancy's Rainbow Six: Siege.

At the 2024 Streamer Awards, Stewart won Best FPS Streamer and was nominated for Gamer of the Year. On December 19, 2024, he signed with Brillstein Entertainment Partners for management presentation.

Stewart participated in the 2025 Sidemen Charity Match, a charity event organized by British YouTube group the Sidemen. The match was held on March 8, 2025, at Wembley Stadium, with Stewart playing for the YouTube Allstars team. He returned for the 2026 Sidemen Charity Match as a striker for Sidemen FC. The match took place on April 18, 2026, in which Stewart would go on to score two goals and win the Man of the Match award. Stewart was nominated for the Esports Awards 2026 alongside IShowSpeed, TheBurntPeanut, Kai Cenat, Stable Ronaldo and several others.

Stewart streamed Clash Royale to a wide audience for the first time on April 23, 2025 as a joke. This stream brought much attention to Clash Royale and a massive wave of players. Stewart since then has streamed and made YouTube content about Clash Royale. While Stewart has officially integrated the game into his regular streaming rotation, it is more on-and-off play due to occasional frustrations with controversial updates, such as when he took a break from Clash Royale on February 6, 2026, due to recent additions to the game. In September 2026, Stewart held a tournament in the video game Fortnite Battle Royale, which included Twitch drops; YouTubers Bazerk & Sizl won the tournament, walking away with $20,000.

== Other ventures ==
On January 23, 2024, Stewart started his own podcast called Jynxzi Podcast. On May 16, 2025, it was announced that Stewart had joined the Kings League and would be the chairperson of Jynxzi FC in the Kings World Cup Clubs Paris 2025. Chess player Levy Rozman (known online as GothamChess) taught Stewart how to play chess in the video game Chess.com, as he wanted to become a "chess master".

== Personal life ==
Stewart started dating Instagram model and influencer Breckie Hill in February 2024. Three months later, in May 2024, Stewart announced on his TikTok account that they had broken up. After the breakup, they started dating again until they broke up again in September 2024.

== Awards and nominations ==
Awards and nominations received by Nicholas Stewart
Ceremony	Year	Category	Result	Ref.
The Streamer Awards	2023	Best Breakthrough Streamer	Won	
The Streamer Awards	2023	Gamer of the Year	Won	
The Streamer Awards	2023	Streamer of the Year	Nominated	
The Streamer Awards	2024	Best FPS Streamer	Won	
The Streamer Awards	2024	Gamer of the Year	Nominated	
The Streamer Awards	2025	Best Strategy Game Streamer	Won	
The Streamer Awards	2025	Gamer of the Year	Nominated	
The Streamer Awards	2026	Best Streamer Collab (Note: Shared with Stable Ronaldo and LosPollosTV.)	Nominated	
The Streamer Awards	2026	Best Marathon Stream (Note: Shared with Stable Ronaldo and LosPollosTV.)	Won	
The Streamer Awards	2026	Gamer of the Year	Won	
The Streamer Awards	2026	Streamer of the Year	Nominated	
The Geometry Dash Awards	2025	Best Streamer	Nominated	
Esports Awards	2025	Esports Content Creator of the Year	Won	
Esports Awards	2026	Esports Content Creator of the Year	Won	

== See also ==
- List of most-followed Twitch channels
