= Fortnite Friday =

Livestreamed talk show series

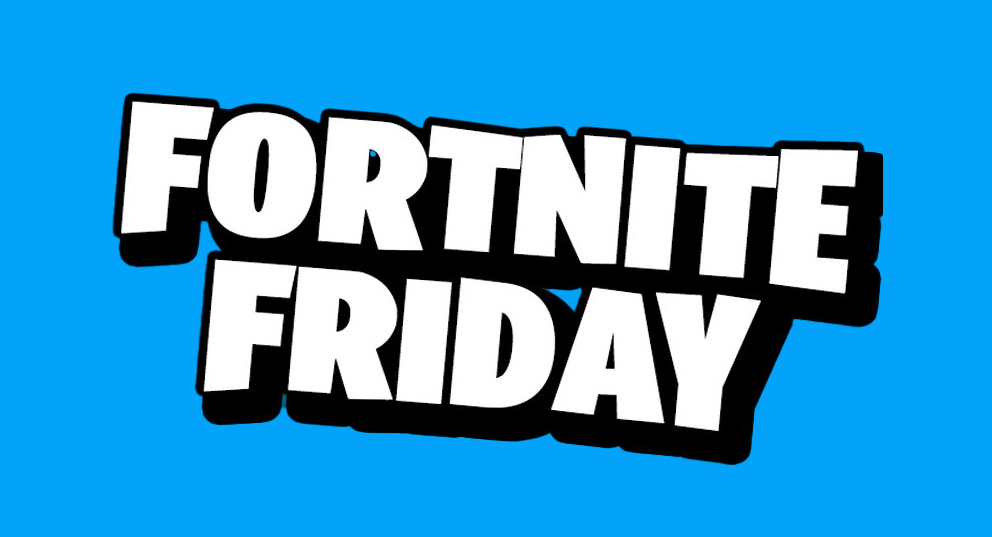
- Genre: Talk show
- Created by: ConnorEatsPants
- Original language: English

Original release
- Network: Twitch; YouTube
- Release: 2020 – present

Fortnite Friday is an American talk show, hosted by live streamer ConnorEatsPants. First aired in 2020, the show centers around Connor interviewing celebrities, political figures, and internet personalities while playing the video game Fortnite Battle Royale. The show is broadcast irregularly, airing live on Twitch with no set schedule. Notable guests include political figures such as California governor Gavin Newsom and expelled former congressperson George Santos.

== Format ==
=== Live Gameplay Setting ===
Fortnite Friday sees a celebrity guest join Connor, rarely showing his face during an episode, to play Fortnite Battle Royale while he conducts an interview. Throughout the show, Connor intersperses legitimate questions in between comedic moments. The gaming aspect of the show has been noted as an unserious backdrop, allowing Connor to catch guests off guard with challenging questions. He admitted to "prefer people that aren't- that don't play a lot of Fortnite" because of skill-based matchmaking. Public comments from viewers using the Twitch chat have been noted to influence topics presented by Connor in real-time.

=== Connor as Host ===
Sports Illustrated writes that whenever a guest is considered controversial, Connor starts his interview more slowly before getting increasingly "heavyhanded" and attempting to make them "slip". Aftermath described him as never breaking his character, with his questioning unpredictable. Rather than preparing with notes, he tends to create mood boards. Although he is represented by a talent agent, most of the guests that have appeared on Fortnite Friday were contacted directly by Connor, usually done publicly through Twitter.

Appearing on various podcasts, he has claimed to want "packaged episodes" uploaded onto his main YouTube channel. Even though he had "gotten the work started on a couple" by January 2025, the first apparent upload since those comments would be over a year later in September 2026 with guest Hunter Biden.

== Background ==
ConnorEatsPants
- Born: August 26, 1999 (age 27)
- Occupations: Live streamer; YouTuber

Twitch information
- Channel: ConnorEatsPants
- Years active: 2016–present
- Followers: 727 thousand

YouTube information
- Channel: ConnorEatsPants LIVE
- Subscribers: 259 thousand
- Views: 51.3 million
- Last updated: January 21, 2026

=== Connor's Early Popularity ===
Connor, known online as ConnorEatsPants, was born on August 26, 1999, and raised in Atlanta, Georgia. He has said that an improv class he took while attending middle school gave him transferable skills to streaming. Known for gaming content, Connor began streaming consistently in 2017 and didn't publicly reveal his face until 2019. Having taken part in different Minecraft role-play servers, as early as 2019 he expressed a desire for his growing audience "to watch even when I'm not playing Minecraft" since it bored him. In a 2020 discussion on brand discovery, Connor revealed his decision that summer to end reliance on Minecraft fans for stable viewership. By mid-2021 he openly discouraged fans of prior role-playing servers from associating him with the groups.

=== Fortnite Collaborations ===
The idea for Fortnite Friday originated as a repeating bit within Connor's community during the COVID-19 pandemic after he had previously experienced "failed attempts to get in touch with Soulja Boy and his team" for customer service reasons. In 2020 Connor successfully reached the rapper to stream not only Fortnite, but Valorant as well. A contemporary interview has Connor describing apprehension at the idea of reaching out to anyone for collaborations until the beginning of that year, when other streamers began to contact him. For the next few years he would continue joking about hosting other celebrities, such as an existing May 2022 podcast episode where he purports to have told Jason Nash "Fortnite Friday, it can happen." By 2023 he stated that he wanted to be "smart" with collaborations to ensure viewers on his stream weren't "here for maybe other people."

The show officially started up again in November 2023 for reasons Connor implied were related to the release of Fortnite OG. Described by Aftermath as a "snowball effect," the popularity of the guests that have appeared on the show has slowly escalated from minor internet personalities like Jacob Sartorius and Baby Gronk, to major politicians like Gavin Newsom. Despite many of his guests having associations on the political right, Connor himself has clarified that the show is mainly comedic and he himself is "more left than right" and wants to highlight "that side of humor, where a lot of times it's kind of labeled as, like, the side that can't be funny."

== Guests ==
List of Fortnite Friday guests
Guest	Year	Notes	Ref.
Soulja Boy	2020	Rapper; played Valorant as well	
Tubbo	2021	YouTuber; unplanned collaboration, sarcastically referred to as "the first guest on season 2 of Fortnite Friday."	
Scott Wozniak	2023	YouTuber; credited as Scott the Woz.	
Jacob Sartorius	2023	Singer and internet personality	
Saltydkdan	2024	YouTuber; credited as Elmo	
Baby Gronk	2024	Internet personality; interview interrupted by father	
Mckenna Grace	2024	Actor and singer; was surprised by prerecorded questions submitted by online creator Jschlatt, conservationist Maya Higa, and twin duo Sinjin Drowning	
Lil Pump	2024	Rapper; unknown "Raymond" could be heard on mic, referred to as his "manager" by Connor. Later on other voices appeared which Pump referred to as his "girlfriend" and "mom".	
Joe Exotic	2024	Media personality; did not actually play Fortnite, Connor created an account called "Santa Rosa Police Department" and had a viewer play	
George Santos	2024	Expelled former U.S. representative; see below	
Zachary Levi	2024	Actor	
Anthony Fantano	2024	Music critic and internet personality; cut off by Connor due to differences of opinion on Sabrina Carpenter	
Adrian Dittmann	2025	X user rumored to be Elon Musk; see below	
A.J. & Big Justice	2025	Internet personalities	
Bhad Bhabie	2025	Rapper and media personality; Connor asked about her experience at Turn-About Ranch then alleged similar experiences at another camp, later elaborated on in a podcast episode. Bhabie also disputed alleged comments by previous guest Soulja Boy (unclear when) on any sexual relationship between them, and claimed inappropriate behavior by rapper Lil Mosey when she was 15. Soulja has denied prior claims by Bhabie.	
Colby Covington	2025	Mixed martial artist	
The Rizzler	2025	Internet personality	
Ashley St. Clair	2025	Conservative influencer and author; despite being promoted as "Elon Musk's Baby Momma", Clair refused any question about the man for lack of "liberty to discuss". Prior guest Rizzler returned for a game without audio connection to Ashley.	
Gavin Newsom	2025	40th Governor of California; see below	
Haliey Welch	2025	Internet personality; tech assistant could be heard on Welch's microphone at certain points. Connor's prior Twitch emote controversy came up when discussing Hailey's emotes.	
Varis Gilaj	2026	Internet personality; credited as ASU Frat Leader. Shared Mic with roommate who asked Connor to show his face briefly. Connor had no mood board created due to the last minute invitation. Ironically, Gilaj would be late to the stream.	
Nick Shirley	2026	Conservative influencer	
Mitchel Musso	2026	Actor and singer; appeared to have forgotten his own prior statements on reshooting an episode of Hannah Montana when Connor inquired about it, resulting in both repeatedly asking the Twitch chat for assistance "fact-checking" claims made later on.	
Hunter Biden	2026	Artist and son of former president Joe Biden	

=== Notable guests ===
==== George Santos ====
George Santos, the former congressperson who represented New York's 3rd congressional district, appeared on Fortnite Friday on October 4, 2024, playing under the screen name 'MrSantosNY'. Santos had originally asked for a $6,000-dollar appearance fee, but later waived it in exchange for Connor agreeing to appear on a future episode of Santos' podcast. Connor claims to have pretended a contract between him and Twitch prevented the payment. During the stream, Connor wore a Buffalo Bills skin adorned with O. J. Simpson's number. Topics discussed on the stream include abortion, gun control, the Trump administration's response to the COVID-19 pandemic, former House Speaker Kevin McCarthy and current House of Representatives speaker Mike Johnson. Discussions unrelated to U.S. politics included favorite childhood Pokémon. The stream with Santos would be nominated for Best Streamed Collab at the 2024 Streamer Awards. Over a year later Connor would tell Santos that he felt "vindicated" with his perspective on the second Trump Presidency.

==== Adrian Dittmann ====
An account on X was operated by a man rumored to be Elon Musk after his voice appeared to sound similar to listeners on the platform. This rumor gained traction based on a prior deposition Musk gave admitting to have used alternative accounts "for testing." With the username "AdrianDittmann", Dittmann came on the show January 3, 2025. During the stream Connor repeatedly made reference to Musk, implying certain answers given by Dittmann supported the rumor, such as their apparent shared enjoyment of Diablo 4. Topics discussed include H-1B visas, Musk's former partner Grimes, and the 2025 Las Vegas cybertruck explosion. Shortly after the stream an investigative report by maia arson crimew and Ryan Fae would come out proving that Dittman was someone else, though Connor would still express varying levels of skepticism about Dittman's relationship with Musk in different public comments.

==== Gavin Newsom ====
Then-governor of California Gavin Newsom appeared on the show on October 3, 2025, playing with the screen name 'CAGovXL'. Newsom criticized fellow Democrats for not performing as well as Republicans on mass media, implying his appearance was an attempt to conduct outreach towards the youth, with The Guardian speculating if it was groundwork for a presidential run. On the show, he relayed an interaction with Trump where he was asked how he liked the nickname 'Newscum' during their last call, which Newsom described as childish. After Connor asked him about Kamala Harris' book 107 Days suggesting that he had initially avoided endorsing Harris, Newsom responded that he had confronted her in text about the statement. Other topics discussed on the stream include transgender athletes, the Gaza war, Newsom's support for the two-state solution, artificial intelligence, home ownership, and the acquisition of Electronic Arts by the Saudi Arabian Public Investment Fund. Newsom said that he was "on [his] hands and knees" multiple times during the stream. Connor later publicly stated that he wanted to be particularly "mindful" of his interview with Newsom due to how "high-profile" he was, so as to not "let him get off the hook" for certain policy decisions.

== Reception ==
Different outlets have characterized Fortnite Friday as part of a larger trend, such as Dexerto writer Connor Bennett who brought up prior examples of celebrities collaborating with Twitch streamers while playing Fortnite. More often it is contextualized it within a narrower scope of politicians appearing on Twitch steams to win over Gen Z as a demographic. GQ magazine called Fortnite Friday "a Gen Alpha Hot Ones" while interviewing QTCinderella, who described Connor as someone that could "thrive at any table."

Sports Illustrated notes that Connor's "viewership usually spiking during his interviews", indicating that the format "has a draw" compared to his typical content. In 2024 his episode with Joe Exotic was considered "gotcha journalism" by fellow Twitch streamer Northernlion. After his interview with Newsom, Twitch streamer Hasan Piker called Connor "the number one political journalist right now", though Andrew Bracken of KPBS considered it "tongue-in-cheek". Connor considers the increase in political guests has made it harder to get traditional celebrities on his show. Aftermath reporter Nathan Grayson said of his Newsom interview, "I don’t know if anyone has held Gavin Newsom’s feet to the fire on, like, Israel-Palestine stuff that well, he just like kept him on track. It was really impressive."

=== Awards and nominations ===
Ceremony	Year	Category	Nominee(s)	Result	Ref.
The Streamer Awards	2024	Best Streamed Collab	ConnorEatsPants & George Santos	Nominated	
The Streamer Awards	2025	Best Streamed Series	Fortnite Friday	Nominated	
