= 2026 Streamer Awards =

Awards ceremony in Los Angeles

- Awarded for: Excellence in live streaming
- Sponsored by: Aethermancer; Ch@mobile; DecoDeco; Demon Bluff; Fanlock; fav.com; Fortnite; IRLToolkit; Jestr; John Gleep; Lunar Client; Morgan & Morgan; offbrand games; poncle; Real App; Rivals of Aether II; Slingshot; Starface; YouTube
- Date: November 12, 2026
- Venue: Avalon Hollywood, Los Angeles, California
- Hosted by: QTCinderella; Caroline Kwan
- Acts: AriAtHome; Girlset

Highlights
- Most wins: IShowSpeed, Kai Cenat, Katie B and Vanillamace (3)
- Most nominations: IShowSpeed, Jynxzi, Kai Cenat and Stable Ronaldo (4)
- Streamer of the Year: IShowSpeed
- Gamer of the Year: Jynxzi
- Legacy Award: Quackity
- League of their Own: Kai Cenat
- The Sapphire Award: Vanillamace

Television/radio coverage
- Runtime: 350 minutes
- Viewership: 970,656 peak viewers
- Produced by: QTCinderella; Michael W. Kiaunis Jr.
- Directed by: Morgan Tremaine

The 2026 Streamer Awards (also referred to as The 6th Annual Streamer Awards) was the sixth edition of the annual Streamer Awards, honoring the best in live streaming in 2026. The ceremony was held on November 12, 2026 at Avalon Hollywood in Los Angeles, California, hosted by QTCinderella and Caroline Kwan.

The awards were originally supposed to take place a week later on November 17, 2026, however the date was moved forward due to it being close to the highly anticipated release of Grand Theft Auto VI.

The red carpet was hosted by Pudgie, Tbvnks, NotQuiteLikeDuB, and Stable Ronaldo. A fashion panel was hosted by Biqtch Puddin' and Rock M. Sakura.

Nominations began on September 12, closed on October 2, and were announced on October 16. Voting began on October 16 and closed on October 31.

This year, nominees had to pre-apply to accept their nominations. For the first time, Kick streamers were eligible for nominations.

For this edition, four new categories were added (Best Cozy Game Streamer, The Morgan & Morgan Streamer Award for Best Crashout, The Spark Award, and the Best Dressed Award) and one category was added back from the 2024 awards (Best Fortnite Streamer). Best Streamed Collab was split into two categories, Best Streamer Collab for collabs between streamers and Best Mainstream Collab for collabs with celebrities.

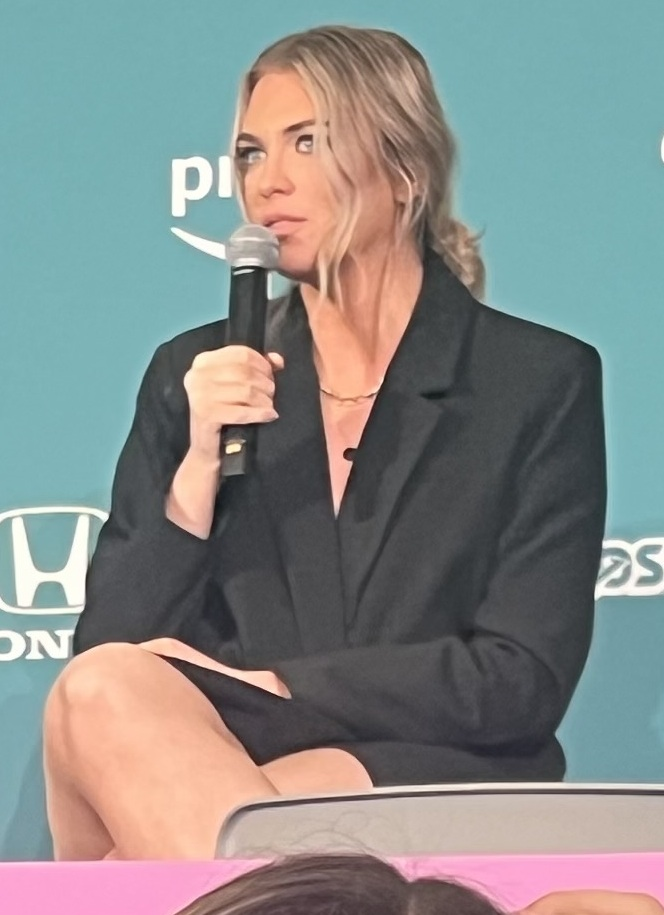
QTCinderella hosted the show.

== Performers ==
The 2026 Streamer awards featured performances from:

Artist(s)	Song(s)
AriAtHome	Freestyled song
Girlset	"Chat" "Young & Dumb"

== Presenters ==
Award presenters were announced ahead of time for the first time ever this ceremony.

- Pudgie, Tbvnks & NotQuiteLikeDuB – presented Best Brand Partner, Stream Game of the Year, Best MMORPG Streamer, Best VTuber, Best FPS Streamer, Best Fighting Game Streamer, Best Battle Royale Streamer, and Best International Streamer
- Bogur – presented Best Strategy Game Streamer
- Biqtch Puddin' & Rock M. Sakura – presented Best Creative Arts Streamer
- Pezzy – presented Best Speedrun Streamer
- Will Neff – presented Best Streamed Series
- Ludwig Ahgren – presented Best Role-Play Streamer
- Ben Parker & Kaden Bowler – presented Best Sports Streamer
- HMBLZAYY – presented the Hidden Gem Award
- Yusuf – presented Best Content Group
- HappyHappyGal – presented Best Cozy Game Streamer
- Sakura Shymko – presented Best MOBA Streamer
- Crystal Izaguirre – presented Best Vertical Live Streamer
- Slushy Noobz – presented Best Streamer Collab
- Tubbo – presented Best Minecraft Streamer
- GeminiTay – presented Best Variety Streamer
- QTCinderella presented The Morgan & Morgan Streamer Award for Biggest Crashout
- ReemKnocks – presented Best Marathon Stream
- ConnorEatsPants – presented Best Fortnite Streamer
- TheTylilShow – presented the President of Chat Award
- Tarayummy – presented Best Streamed Event
- Jamie Miller – presented Best Music Streamer
- Caleb McDaniel – presented Best IRL Streamer
- ChandlerIRS – presented Best Reality Streamer
- Lani Aliza – presented the League of their Own Award
- Samwitch – presented the Rising Star Award
- Julia Kins & MisterArther – presented Best Stream Duo
- Rosii & Semi – presented the Streamer Choice Award
- Valkyrae – presented Best Breakout Streamer
- Yugi – presented Best Mainstream Collab
- Fanfan – presented Gamer of the Year
- Courtney Miller & Angela Giarratana – presented the Sapphire Award
- Quackity – presented Streamer of the Year

== Winners and nominees ==
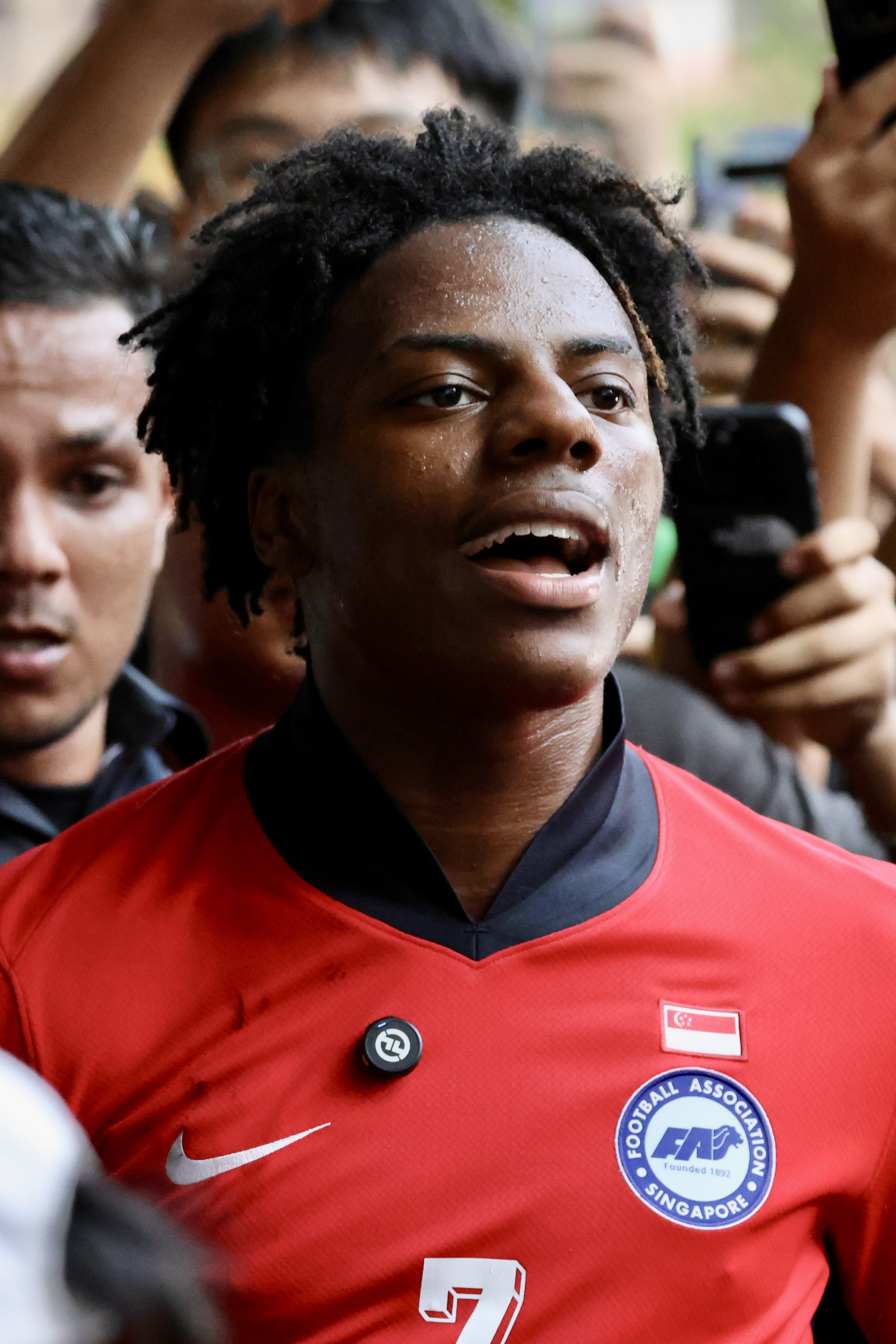
IShowSpeed, winner of the Streamer of the Year award.

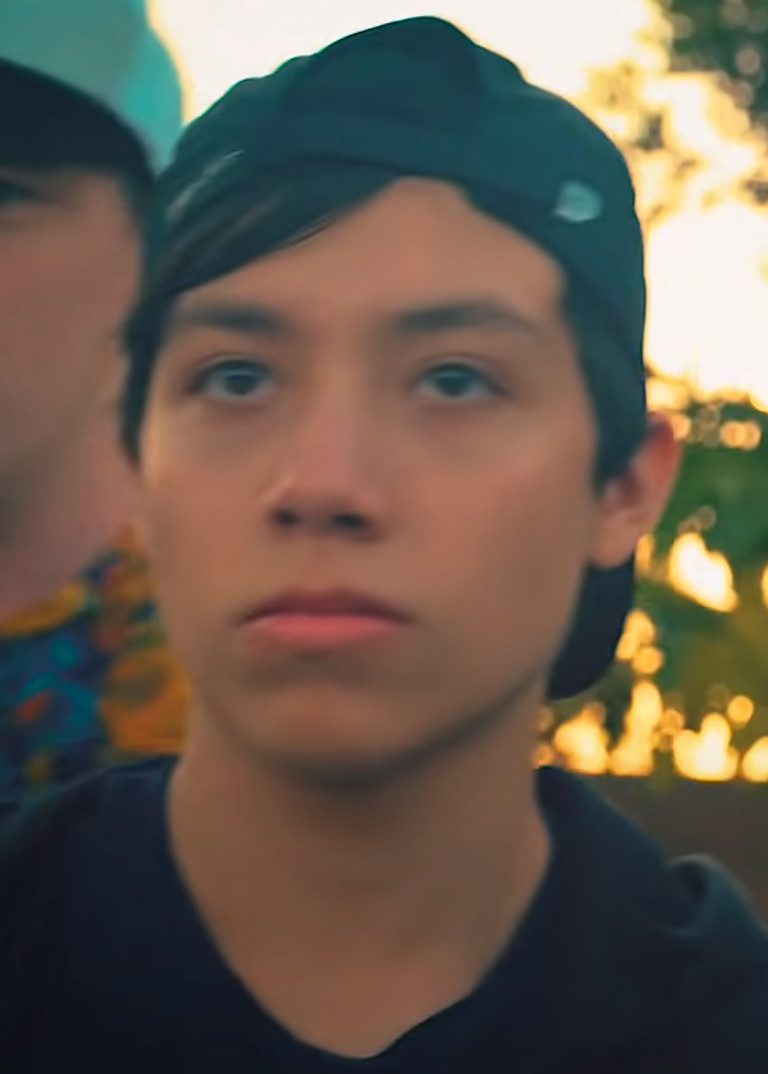
Quackity, winner of the Legacy award

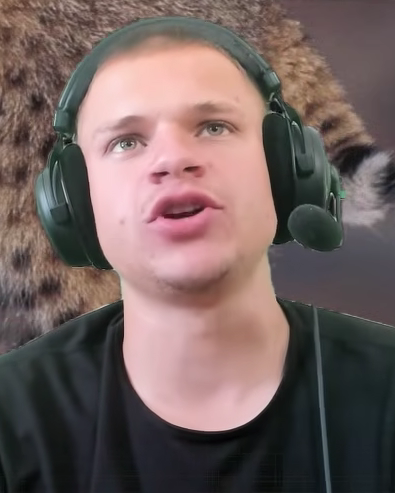
Jynxzi, winner of the Gamer of the Year award

Streamers were nominated and voted for by their fans, with a 30% weight towards the Streamer Awards panel. The Legacy Award and the Streamer's Streamer Award were voted on by the Streamer Awards panel and in-person audience respectively.

Winners are listed first and in bold.

**Best Music Streamer**: **AriAtHome**; PlaqueBoyMax; Bishu; DDG	**Best Creative Arts Streamer (Presented by DecoDeco)**: **BarleyTheBurr**; Michael Reeves; Nurse Huckleberry; UwosLab
**Best Role-Play Streamer**: **Critical Role**; Burn; Kaysan; Will Neff	**Best MOBA Streamer**: **Dantes**; Caedrel; Tenshi; Topson
**Best Brand Partner**: **Red Bull**; GamerSupps; State Farm; TVU	**Hidden Gem Award (Presented by Jestr)**: **SmallFryz**; Awkventurer; Chiseled Adonis; cnotbusch; luci_suckz
**Best Fortnite Streamer (Presented by Fortnite)**: **Clix**; AussieAntics; Faxuty; HappyHappyGal	**Best Battle Royale Streamer**: **NiceWigg**; Camy; Diazbiffle; ImperialHal
**Best Fighting Game Streamer**: **Phidx**; Brian_F; Diaphone; loltyler1	**Best MMORPG Streamer**: **Savix**; Odablock; PikabooIRL; Xaryu
**Best Cozy Game Streamer**: **millkberry**; Gab Smolders; GeminiTay; lilsimsie	**Best Speedrun Streamer**: **Feinberg**; BlueSR; hackingnoisess; Infume
**Best Sports Streamer (Presented by Real App)**: **flight23white**; Auziomf; Danny Aarons; Lacy	**Best Minecraft Streamer (Presented by Lunar Client)**: **Katie B**; ashswag; DrDonut; Feinberg
**Best FPS Streamer**: **OhnePixel**; GOFNS; itsSpoit; supertf; TheBurntPeanut	**Best Strategy Game Streamer (Presented by Demon Bluff)**: **Jillyeon**; Hera; RduLive; Roffle
**League of their Own (Presented by John Gleep)**: **Kai Cenat**; Emily D. Baker; HasanAbi; Maya Higa; MidnightSumo	**Best Reality Streamer**: **Stable Ronaldo**; 2xrakai; Kanel Joseph; Khan Asadi; willito
**Best IRL Streamer (Presented by IRLToolkit)**: **IShowSpeed**; cooksux; Evelyn Ortiz; ExtraEmily; Qoqsik	**Best Vertical Live Streamer (Presented by fav.com)**: **Dean Withers**; Ashby; WardrobeWinter; Wendy Ortiz
**Stream Game of the Year**: **Meccha Chameleon**; Big Walk; Fortnite; Minecraft	**Best Content Group**: **CORE**; AMP; Clooless; F.S.L.R. (fuslie, Squeex, Ludwig, Valkyrae); QSMP
**Best International Streamer**: **ashswag**; Carter Efe; Peller; staryuuki; Young Multi	**Best Stream Duo**: **Katie B & Vanillamace**; Blou & Zias; E11ysa & FindJeremiah; Marlon & Lacy; pge4 & sugarfree
**Best Streamer Collab**: **Maya Higa & Adapt**; AriGameplays & Rivers_GG; JasonTheWeen, NotQuiteLikeDub, TBVNKS & Pudgie16; Jynxzi, Stable Ronaldo & LosPollosTV; YourRage & AustinShow	**Best Mainstream Collab**: **Kai Cenat & Tyla**; BenDadon & Drake; Cinna & Girlset; N3on & Iggy Azalea; WardrobeWinter & Lizzo
**Best Marathon Stream**: **Chained Together - Jynxzi, Stable Ronaldo & LosPollosTV**; 7 Days Stranded - JasonTheWeen; Cinnathon - Cinna; Hit-A-Thon - DDG; Minecraft Marathon - IShowSpeed & Kai Cenat	**Best Streamed Event**: **Streamer University - Kai Cenat**; 24 Hour Tag - PaymoneyWubby; Streamer Games - Ludwig; ZEvent - Zerator
**Best Streamed Series**: **World Cup Tour - IShowSpeed**; DVD Week - GoOffKings; Maybach Monday - JasonTheWeen; Paranormal Detour - detune; Survival - Agent00	**Best VTuber**: **Ironmouse**; Crelly; Gigi Murin; Koseki Bijou; TheBurntPeanut
**Best Variety Streamer (Presented by Rivals of Aether II)**: **Caseoh**; Agent00; CohhCarnage; Jenn McAllister; moonmoon	**President of Chat (Note: Named Best Just Chatting Streamer in nominations and at previous ceremonies.) (Presented by Ch@mobile)**: **Joe Bartolozzi**; BruceDropEmOff; Silky; Vanillamace; Yourrage
**Rising Star Award (Presented by Slingshot)**: **E11ysa**; Benjy Chavez; Madi2Hottyy; MaxGGs; T10Nat	**Best Breakout Streamer**: **Katie B**; Arky; Joe Bartolozzi; Marlon; Yonna Jay
**The Sapphire Award**: **Vanillamace**; ChristinaAndAmber; Cinna; Maya Higa; Yonna Jay	**The Morgan & Morgan Streamer Award for Biggest Crashout**: **Lacy**
**The Spark Award**: **HMBLZAYY**	**Best Dressed Award**: **Vanillamace**
**Streamer's Choice Award**: **supertf**	**Legacy Award**: **Quackity**
**Gamer of the Year (Presented by Aethermancer)**: **Jynxzi**; Feinberg; iiTzTimmy; supertf; TheBurntPeanut	**Streamer of the Year (Presented by YouTube)**: **IShowSpeed**; Caseoh; Joe Bartolozzi; Jynxzi; Stable Ronaldo

== Controversies ==
=== Stage-crashing incident ===
During AriAtHome's acceptance speech for Best Music Streamer, an audience member went on stage and quoted Kanye West's infamous speech from the 2009 MTV Video Music Awards, saying "I'ma let you finish, but DDG had the best music of all time." Following the incident, DDG denied any involvement and apologized to AriAtHome on Twitter, which Ari responded kindly to.

=== Best Stream Duo category ===
Following Katie B and Vanillamace's win in the Best Stream Duo category, fellow nominee B Lou made multiple posts on Twitter calling the awards show rigged. In a post where he asked QTCinderella to release the votes, she responded with a screenshot of the results, showing Katie B and Vanillamace in first place with 381,854 votes, and B Lou and Zias in fourth place with 76,642 votes, stating, "Are you happy now?" She would later delete the post, saying, "Deleted my original tweet cause I was inherently adding to the toxic narrative that circulates online every year that I am vehemently against. I would like to try to be better than that."
