= Peller =

Peller is a surname. Notable people with the surname include:

- Clara Peller (1902–1987), American manicurist and actress
- Joseph Peller (born 1953), American artist and teacher
- Gary Peller (born 1955), American academic and lawyer
- Shina Peller (born 1976), Nigerian entrepreneur, politician, and industrialist

== See also ==
- Peller (streamer)
