= PChal =

German streamer and YouTuber (born 1995)

pChal
- Born: Jan Krüger; 16 May 1995 (age 31)
- Other names: pChalTV, Pokémon Challenges
- Occupations: Twitch streamer; YouTuber

Twitch information
- Channel: pChal
- Years active: 2016–present
- Genre: Gaming
- Game: Pokémon
- Followers: 355,000

YouTube information
- Channel: pChal
- Years active: 2016–present
- Subscribers: 973,000
- Views: 220.4 million
- Last updated: 19 September 2026

Jan Krüger (/ˈjɑːn/ YAHN; born 16 May 1995), better known as pChal or Pokémon Challenges, is a German streamer and YouTuber, known for his live streams on Twitch, broadcasting Pokémon content, most notably Nuzlocke challenges.

== Career ==
Krüger is known for completing so-called "hardcore" Nuzlocke challenges on Twitch, which are challenge runs of Pokémon games aimed at increasing the difficulty of the game. His Nuzlocke challenges include further restrictions compared to the traditional ruleset, such as level caps and no items in battle. In 2016, Krüger completed a permadeath solo run of Pokémon FireRed using only a Rattata, one of the game's weakest characters.

Krüger's YouTube and Twitch channels significantly gained traction in 2020, following a reaction video to a Nuzlocke attempt by Jaiden Animations. During the same period, Krüger was attempting the Nuzlocke challenge of Pokémon Emerald Kaizo, a ROM hack of Pokémon Emerald, which he beat in 2021. Coincidentally, he completed the challenge in 151 attempts, the exact number of generation I Pokémon.

Krüger was nominated for the "Best Strategy Game Streamer" category of the 2025 Streamer Awards.

== Awards and nominations ==
Ceremony	Year	Category	Result	Ref.
The Streamer Awards	2025	Best Strategy Game Streamer	Nominated	
