= Gentlemen's Fury =

- VOD release poster
- Directed by: Ben Sharples; Marissa Hall
- Written by: Ben Sharples; Clint Gardner; Marissa Hall; Bronson Diallo
- Produced by: Ben Sharples; Marissa Hall
- Starring: Ben Sharples; Jake Head; Audrey Ellis Fox
- Cinematography: Matt McClung; Pearce Healey; Bronson Diallo
- Edited by: Ben Sharples; Marissa Hall
- Music by: Perry Woo
- Production company: Gold Door Films
- Release date: May 23, 2017
- Running time: 79 minutes
- Country: United States
- Language: English

Gentlemen's Fury is a 2017 American comedy film written, produced, and directed by Ben Sharples and Marissa Hall. The film stars Sharples, Jake Head, and Audrey Ellis Fox. The plot follows a professional tennis player who, after being banned from the tour for a violent outburst, is recruited into a secret underground tennis league. The film has been described as a satirical blend of Fight Club and sports comedies like Dodgeball.

== Plot ==
Professional tennis player Aaron Faust (Sharples) suffers a public meltdown during a charity match at the estate of Mickey Rooney; after an opponent taunts him for not belonging in a "gentleman's sport," Aaron punches him, declaring that tennis is actually a "pussy sport." Consequently, Aaron is banned from the ATP tour, dumped by his fiancée, and ordered to attend anger management.

In therapy, Aaron meets Julie (Fox), who introduces him to Dwayne (Head), an intense tennis zealot who runs an underground league known as "Gentlemen's Fury." Dwayne claims the league is the solution to the sport's "soft" image. Aaron discovers that the league is composed of other disgraced former pros and operates with violent, contact-heavy rules. As Aaron becomes more involved, he realizes the club is a cult-like organization led by the increasingly psychopathic Dwayne, and he must fight to survive the escalating danger of the matches.

== Cast ==
- Ben Sharples as Aaron Faust
- Jake Head as Dwayne
- Audrey Ellis Fox as Julie
- Kyle Leibovitch as Fabricio
- Taishi Mizuno as Helicopter
- Scotty Tovar as Memo
- J.B. Bauersfeld as Rudy Nudeo
- Raheem Williams as Juggler

== Allusions to actual players ==
The film includes tongue-in-cheek references to several professional tennis players known for on-court controversies or suspensions, including John McEnroe, Bernard Tomic, Nikolay Davydenko, Jeff Tarango, Wayne Odesnik, and Richard Gasquet.

== Production ==
The film was funded via a successful Kickstarter campaign and began principal photography on June 1, 2015. It was shot over 18 days on location in Santa Monica and Manhattan Beach, with studio scenes filmed at Studios 60 in Los Angeles. Post-production took place over the following year, with Sharples and Hall handling the editing.

== Distribution ==
Following its presentation at the 2016 American Film Market, the film attracted interest from over a dozen distribution outlets. However, the filmmakers ultimately chose to retain full control of the property and self-distribute through their production company, Gold Door Films. Gentlemen's Fury premiered on May 23, 2017, via Vimeo On Demand, followed by releases on iTunes and Amazon later that year.

== Reception ==
In a review for The Beach Reporter, Michael Hixon noted the film's satirical take on the "gentlemanly" reputation of tennis, describing it as "Fight Club meets tennis." The film was an official selection of the Sunscreen Film Festival West, where Sharples won Best Actor and the film was nominated for Best Picture.

== Serialized adaptation ==
In 2023, the film was released in a serialized format titled Gentlemen's Fury: Reloaded. The eight-episode series consisted of a re-edited version of the feature film, modified for a faster pace to suit digital audiences.
