= Flight 7500 =

2014 film directed by Takashi Shimizu

- Directed by: Takashi Shimizu
- Written by: Craig Rosenberg
- Produced by: Takashige Ichise; Roy Lee
- Starring: Leslie Bibb; Jerry Ferrara; Ryan Kwanten; Amy Smart
- Cinematography: David Tattersall
- Edited by: Sean Valla
- Music by: Tyler Bates
- Production companies: CBS Films; Vertigo Entertainment; Ozla Pictures; Ozla Productions
- Distributed by: CBS Films; Lionsgate
- Release dates: June 11, 2014 (Philippines); April 12, 2016 (United States)
- Running time: 97 minutes
- Countries: Japan; United States
- Language: English
- Box office: $2.8 million

Flight 7500 is a 2014 American supernatural horror film directed by Takashi Shimizu and starring Leslie Bibb, Jerry Ferrara, Ryan Kwanten, and Amy Smart. It tells the story of a supernatural force on a commercial airline flight. The film was released in the United States on April 12, 2016, by CBS Films and Lionsgate, after being released theatrically in Asia.

== Plot ==
Vista Pacific Airlines flight 7500, a Boeing 747–300, departs from Los Angeles to Tokyo Haneda. Passengers onboard include a group of two vacationing couples, Lyn and Jack, and Brad and Pia, the latter of whom have secretly broken up; a thief named Jake; a suspicious-looking businessman traveling with a strange wooden box, Lance Morrell; a young woman named Raquel; newlyweds Rick and Liz; and a goth woman, Jacinta. Flight attendants Laura and Suzy welcome the passengers on board. Suzy questions Laura about her secret relationship with the married captain, Pete.

A few hours into the flight, the plane hits turbulence. Lance has a panic attack, bleeds profusely from his mouth, and dies. Captain Pete moves the first-class passengers into economy class and keeps Lance's body in the closed-off first class.

Laura warns everyone to fasten their seatbelts, as the cabin pressure drops. Oxygen masks are dispensed, and thick smoke fills the cabin floor. After the cabin pressure returns to normal and the smoke disappears, Laura finds Raquel unconscious in the bathroom and revives her with an oxygen tank. The plane's radio stops working and Captain Pete cannot contact Tokyo air traffic controllers.

Jake goes to first-class and steals a Rolex from Lance's body. When he pulls back the cloth covering the body, he is petrified by something off-screen. Suzy finds out that Jake and Lance's body have both disappeared. Laura notices an F-16 fighter jet flying beside their plane, but Pete says that no fighter jets are present. Brad's in-flight TV show distorts and shows an image of Lance, while Liz is startled by a reflection of Lance on her laptop screen. Raquel returns to the bathroom to do a pregnancy test and is relieved it turns out negative. Smoke fills the bathroom and a hand grabs her and pulls her into the floor.

The images of Lance appearing on their screens lead the passengers to search his belongings. Inside his carry-on are tubes of hair with women's names taped onto them. They open Lance's wooden box and find a "death doll," which Jacinta explains is a Shinigami — a being who collects people's souls after they die, but only if they let go of whatever is holding them to this world. Suzy informs Laura that Lance's death has made her realize she does not want to marry her fiancé, which in turn leads to Laura breaking up with Pete.

Laura searches Lance's checked luggage in the cargo hold. A hand emerges and drags Laura away. As Suzy waits for Laura by the hatch, another hand grabs at her. Suzy runs into first class, while a cloud of smoke follows her. The smoke clears and Brad, Pia, Rick, Liz, and Jacinta rush to find out what is wrong. As Suzy walks towards them, one of the overhead compartments opens and she disappears into it. While the others rush towards the cockpit, Jacinta hears her own words about death and hesitantly walks towards an unknown figure and hugs it.

The others discover Captain Pete and the co-pilot dead in their seats. They eventually find their own corpses slumped in their seats. The entertainment screen in the cabin shows a breaking news story that Flight 7500 suffered a catastrophic decompression, and communication was lost. The F-16 that Laura saw earlier was sent to investigate the plane but found all passengers and crew had died in the turbulence, due to the effects of Generalized hypoxia. Everyone who has disappeared was taken after they let go of the one thing that was tying them to the world. Brad and Pia accept their deaths and reconcile as the plane runs out of fuel and crashes into the ocean. Liz, who had covered her face with her hands, looks up to find the plane empty. She hears the sound of the death doll coming from one of the waste bins, a discolored hand appears, and Liz ducks out of frame.

== Cast ==
- Leslie Bibb as Laura Baxter
- Jamie Chung as Suzy Lee
- Ryan Kwanten as Brad Martin
- Amy Smart as Pia Martin
- Jerry Ferrara as Rick Lewis
- Nicky Whelan as Liz Lewis
- Scout Taylor-Compton as Jacinta Bloch
- Christian Serratos as Raquel Mendoza
- Alex Frost as Jake
- Aja Evans as Lyn Hafey
- Ben Sharples as Jack Hafey
- Rick Kelly as Lance Morrell
- Johnathon Schaech as Pete Haining
- David Banner as Tom Anders
- Ryan Higa as Dustin Cotchin
- Leni Ito as Chisato Yanagi
- David Chisum as NTSB Spokesman

== Production ==
Roy Lee, a producer of Flight 7500, first approached the director Takashi Shimizu with the concept of a film depicting panic settling in on an airplane. Shimizu agreed to take on the project.

== Release ==
In November 2011, CBS Films set the film, then known as 7500, for an August 31, 2012 release. Trailers ran in theaters, attached to screenings of The Possession. However, in May 2012, it was pulled from the schedule for a 2013 release date. The film was released on April 12, 2016, on video on demand and on home media formats under the title Flight 7500.

The film was released theatrically internationally in countries such as Philippines, Brazil, Turkey, and Japan.

== Box office ==
As of September 1, 2015, the international gross for the film is $2.8 million.
