= OhnePixel =

German Twitch streamer and YouTuber (born 1998)

ohnePixel
- ohnePixel in 2026
- Born: Mark Zimmermann; May 11, 1998 (age 28); Germany

Twitch information
- Channel: ohnePixel
- Years active: 2021–present
- Genres: Gaming; Just Chatting
- Games: Counter-Strike 2; Counter-Strike: Global Offensive
- Followers: 3 million

YouTube information
- Channels: ohnePixel; ohnepixel raw
- Years active: 2019–present
- Genre: Gaming
- Subscribers: 1.21 million (ohnepixel); 1.34 million (ohnepixel raw)
- Views: 244 million (ohnepixel); 4.76 billion (ohnepixel raw)
- OhnePixel's voice ohnePixel pronouncing his alias in a YouTube video Recorded 21 Jan, 2025
- Last updated: October 29 2026

Mark Zimmermann (born 11 May 1998), also known as ohnePixel, is a German Twitch streamer and YouTuber. Known for his knowledge of skins and trading within Counter-Strike: Global Offensive and Counter-Strike 2, he has been cited as the most popular English-language Counter-Strike streamer.

== Early life ==
Mark Zimmermann was born on 11 May 1998. He grew up in Lüneburg, Lower Saxony, Germany.

== Career ==
ohnePixel began streaming in 2021. After the release of Counter-Strike 2, ohnePixel began streaming the game regularly and pointing out bugs. In July 2023, he received a donation of CS:GO items worth $129,000. Consisting of in-game cases, his subsequent opening of them was the largest in the game's history, but his opening of the cases resulted in "essentially nothing good".

In December 2023, ohnePixel and fellow YouTuber zipeL launched a skin marketplace website. The site crashed almost immediately due to high demand. He later bought the marketplace website Skinbid with ULTI Agency. In November 2025, the site filed for bankruptcy, with ohnePixel stating on a livestream "It’s a lose-lose-lose for everyone... I remember when I announced it, it was a dream come true. I haven’t been a part of it for a year, but if anyone still has skins [on the website], withdraw them."

In July 2024, ohnePixel signed and coached an esports team named "DRILLAS" to qualify for the Perfect World Shanghai Major 2024. The team qualified to the APAC RMR after winning the Middle Eastern qualifiers, but was eliminated. The team was criticized by some for using a player substitution to attend the APAC RMR with only two out of five players being from the region, something that was seen by some members of the game's APAC community as "an attempt to steal one of the APAC slots back to Europe".

== Personal life ==
As of 2025, Zimmermann lives in the Netherlands.

Outside of collecting rare in-game items from the Counter-Strike series, Zimmermann also collects rare cards and memorabilia from the Pokémon and Yu-Gi-Oh! franchises.

== Awards and nominations ==
Year	Ceremony	Category	Result	Ref.
2024	HLTV Community Awards	Streamer of the Year	Won	
2025	The Streamer Awards	Best FPS Streamer	Nominated	
2025	The Streamer Awards	Gamer of the Year	Nominated	
2025	HLTV Community Awards	Streamer of the Year	Won	
2026	The Streamer Awards	Best FPS Streamer	Won	
2026	The Game Awards	Content Creator of the Year	Pending	
