= Alveus Sanctuary =

American non-profit conservation organization

- Formation: February 2021
- Legal status: 501(c)(3) charitable organization
- Purpose: Conservation and online education
- Headquarters: Austin, Texas, U.S.
- Region served: Worldwide
- Official language: English
- Executive Director: Maya Higa
- Director of Operations: Connor O'Brien
- Revenue: $1,592,716 (2024)
- Expenses: $902,591 (2024)
- Website: www.alveussanctuary.org

Twitch information
- Channel: AlveusSanctuary
- Years active: 2021–present
- Genres: Animals, Aquariums, and Zoos; Just Chatting
- Followers: 491,734
- Last updated: November 9, 2026

Alveus Sanctuary is a 501(c)(3) non-profit organization that houses non-releasable animals and provides online conservation education, primarily through 24/7 live-streamed content on Twitch.tv and produced content on YouTube. The name Alveus is borrowed from Latin alveus ("the channel or bed of a river"). Alveus is designed as an online-only space, where "visitors" to the sanctuary can see the animals online, but not in person, which helps to keep stress levels low for the animals.

== History and funding ==
Maya Higa founded Alveus in February 2021, with a 21-hour-long live stream to raise initial capital to fund the sanctuary. The live stream raised over $500,000, with donations over $100 receiving a metal leaf that would be displayed at Alveus. An auction was also held during the stream that included a pair of loafers from T-Pain and an hour with streamer Shroud, which was won by Ludwig Ahgren with a $53,000 donation.

Alveus continues to use the live streams on Twitch as their main way to educate their audience on conservation and to raise funds to continue operating. Alongside accepting donations at any time on the stream, they also host many dedicated fundraising events, such as their 2022 Art Auction which sold off paintings created by the animal ambassadors at the sanctuary for donations, raising over $40,000 during the single event.

Other content creators also help to raise funds for Alveus, either through collaboration streams at Alveus or through dedicated fundraising events for Alveus. At DreamHack Atlanta 2022, Ludwig raised $315,000 during his 50-hour-long glass box stream, with 50% of that being donated to Alveus. Fellow streamers Britt and Malena held a fundraising live stream for Alveus in November 2022 and raised over $20,000 for the sanctuary, during a period of time where Higa had stepped away from streaming.

In April 2023, the new CEO of Twitch, Dan Clancy, visited Alveus to meet the staff and ambassadors. Clancy also donated his first month of earnings from his personal Twitch stream to Alveus.

In February 2024, the Twitch channel was nominated for Best Shared Channel at the 2023 Streamer Awards. In September 2024, during the opening ceremony of the semi-annual TwitchCon event, Twitch announced a donation of $100,000 to Alveus Sanctuary.

In December 2025, the Alveus Tours was nominated for Best Streamed Series at the 2025 Streamer Awards.

== Conservation and education efforts ==
Alveus takes in animals for a variety of reasons, some of them being non-releasable due to injuries or confiscations from the pet trade. As of 2026, Alveus houses 35 animal "ambassadors". These animals act as ambassadors for their species, all with different stories and conservation missions. These animal ambassadors are used in Alveus' educational content to allow viewers to build a connection to the specific animal and then learn to care for the species as a whole. "I learned that model of people falling in love with an individual animal and then caring about their species and planet," Higa told KXAN. "If they knew, they would care, because they love these animals, and so my job is to be that bridge and teach people."

Stompy, an emu, was the first ambassador at Alveus and helps educate viewers on the exotic meat trade, traditional medicine, and overexploitation of animal products in cosmetics. Higa hand-raised Stompy on many of her live streams as Alveus was initially built. Other ambassadors at the sanctuary include macaws, American red foxes, a carpet python, donkeys, chinchillas, and marmosets.

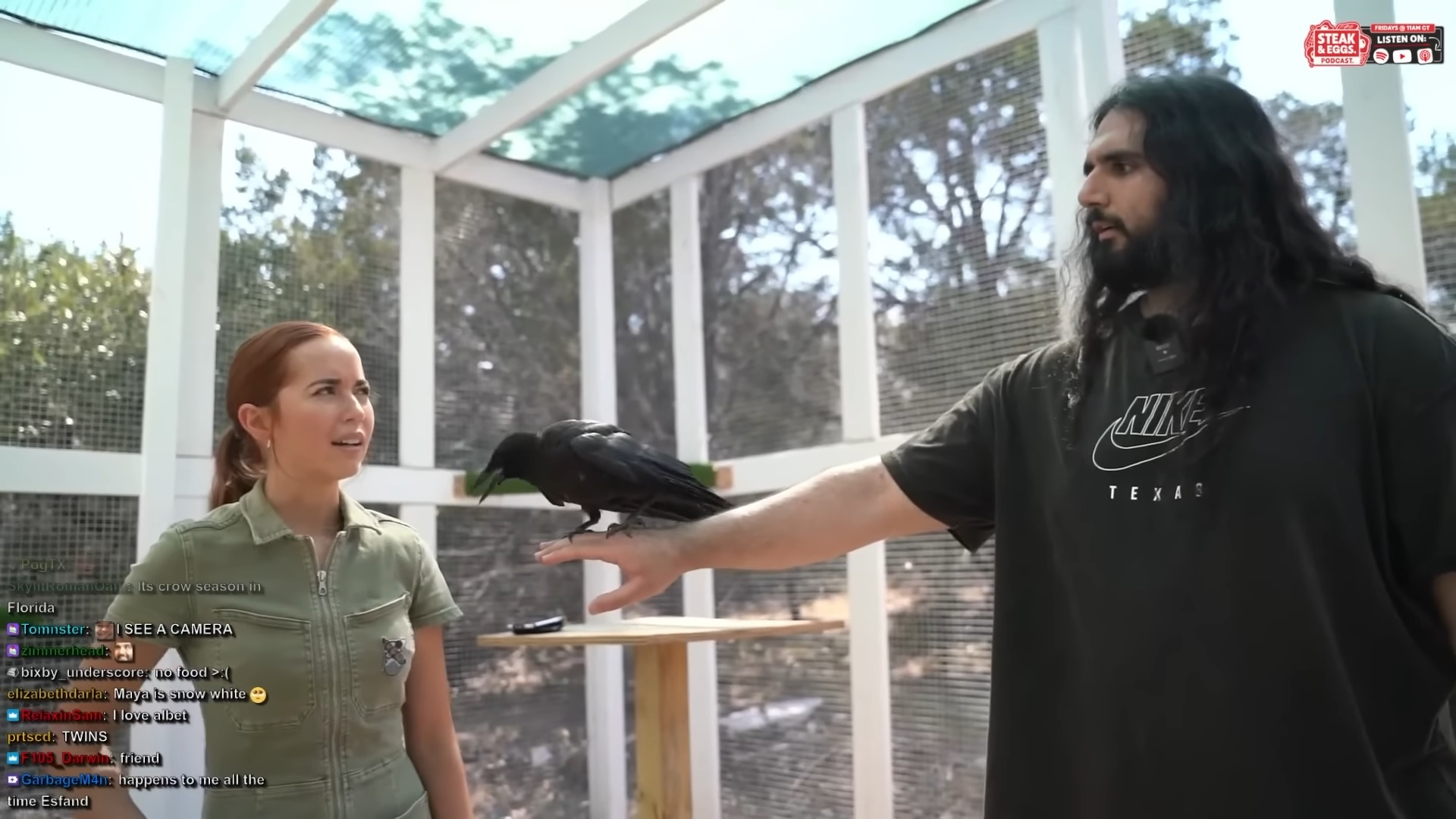
Alveus collaboration stream with Twitch streamer EsfandTV

The sanctuary is based on 40 acres of land in Leander, Texas. It is not open to the public due to safety concerns. Education at Alveus all happens online, with a 24/7 livestream of animals in the sanctuary, collaborations with different content creators to spread the conservation messaging to a wider audience, and other produced content. Higa hosts Animal Quest, a live series where each episode introduces viewers to an ambassador at the sanctuary, teaches them about their story, their species' importance to the environment, and what they can do to help.

On April 4, 2023, Higa and Alveus teamed up with Twitch to host a weekly show called Nerve Center presented by Ally, a sponsored education show based around the animals at Alveus. The guests for this show featured a roster of online creators, including Daily Dose of Internet, Dareon, and Caroline Kwan.

On October 19, 2025, Higa announced an expansion of Alveus Sanctuary into the Alveus Research & Recovery Institute (ARRI). ARRI has two main objectives: advancing conservation technology, such as trackers and research, and species recovery with breeding programs. This institute will initially focus on conservation breeding programs for red wolves and Mexican gray wolves, which are both critically endangered species. Alveus raised $1 million through direct donations in the three days following that announcement, and announced a second fundraiser immediately after. Donors of $100 will have their Twitch usernames displayed on two murals at ARRI. Higa has stated that her and the Alveus/ARRI team have plans to expand ARRI into breeding programs for other endangered species, with considerations put into animals such as the indigo snake, the gopher tortoise, the ocelot, and the Egyptian vulture.

== Awards and nominations ==
Ceremony	Year	Category	Nominated work	Result	Ref.
The Streamer Awards	2023	Best Shared Channel	—N/a	Nominated	
The Streamer Awards	2025	Best Streamed Series	Alveus Tours	Nominated	

On November 19, 2026, Austin City Council member Vanessa Fuentes, on behalf of the Mayor of Austin, proclaimed the day Alveus Sanctuary Day in Austin, Texas.

== See also ==
- List of most-subscribed Twitch channels
