= Stable Ronaldo =

American online streamer

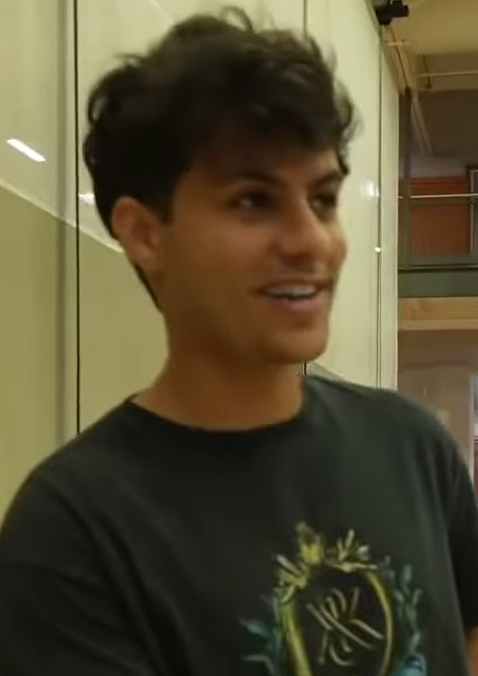
- Netz in 2026
- Born: Rani Netz; January 15, 2003 (age 23); Cherry Hill, New Jersey, U.S.
- Occupations: Streamer; record producer; rapper

Twitch information
- Channel: stableronaldo
- Years active: 2017–present
- Genres: Gaming; irl; variety
- Games: Fortnite; Minecraft; Tom Clancy's Rainbow Six Siege; Elden Ring
- Followers: 5.1 million

YouTube information
- Channel: Stable Ronaldo Live
- Years active: 2016–present
- Genres: IRL and Gaming.
- Subscribers: 1.15 million
- Views: 56.2 million
- Last updated: October 19 , 2026

Rani Netz, (born January 15, 2003) known online as Stable Ronaldo, or simply Ron, is an American Twitch streamer and YouTuber based in Los Angeles, California. He is primarily known for his energetic personality and former competitive career in Fortnite. Formerly a member of organizations such as NRG and FaZe Clan, he announced his departure from FaZe on December 25, 2025. After this he joined and founded "Core" with Marlon, Adapt, Jason, Lacy and Silky on April 30th 2026.

== Early life ==
Netz was born on January 15, 2003 in Cherry Hill, New Jersey. He spent much of his childhood with his mother following his parents' divorce. Later at the age of 21, he retired his mother. He attended Cherry Hill High School East and graduated in 2021.

== Career ==
After suffering a concussion from playing ice hockey, Netz was forced to stop playing and began looking for a new activity. He received his first gaming laptop in 2014 at age 11, where he played games such as Counter-Strike: Global Offensive and Call of Duty. Around the release of Fortnite, he purchased a gaming PC. In 2019, Netz gained attention in the gaming community when he became a Fortnite Champion Series winner, placing first in the FNCS: Chapter 2 Season 1 Grand Finals.

During the COVID-19 pandemic, Twitch viewership increased significantly, contributing to Netz' rapid rise in streaming. Clips of his went viral including a video of him singing "Payphone" by Maroon 5 in July 2020. Throughout 2020, his follower count grew from approximately 800,000 to over one million. In August 2020, Netz joined NRG and moved into the organization's content house alongside Clix, UnknownArmy, and Edgeyy, where he produced content for the NRG channel. He departed the group on January 5, 2022, citing internal issues. He was later signed to LA-based talent management firm The Kinetic Group in February 2022.

In June 2022, Netz joined FaZe Clan and remained with the organization following its restructuring. On April 27, 2024, Richard "Banks" Bengtson removed several members from FaZe Clan as part of an effort to "reboot" the organization, leaving fourteen content creators on the roster including Netz. In December 2024, FaZe was nominated for Best Marathon Stream and won Best Content Organization at The Streamer Awards. The following year, FaZe won Best Content Organization for the second time in a row. Netz was a host live-streaming both events.

On December 25, 2025, Netz announced his departure from FaZe Clan on X, without providing a public explanation. Several other members, including Adapt, Lacy, JasonTheWeen, and Silky, also exited the organization around the same time. Netz participated in Kai Cenat's Streamer University 2026, winning the Community Builder Award. In September 2026, he appeared alongside LeBron James in a star-studded Polymarket commercial celebrating the NFL kickoff.

In April 2026, following his departure from FaZe Clan, he formed a new collective of former FaZe members called "CORE." Later that year, in October 2026, he was nominated for both Streamer of the Year and Reality Streamer of the Year, winning the latter.

== Controversies ==
In July 2023, a drunken Ninja called Netz "completely irrelevant" and a "failed streamer" during a live broadcast due to his declining viewership at the time. Netz retaliated by labeling Ninja a "sellout" for his past platform deals and criticizing him for having a "god complex" regarding younger creators. The feud officially ended in December 2024 when Ninja issued an unreserved apology on stream, admitting he "saw red for no reason" and that alcohol was no excuse for his behavior. They later streamed Fortnite together.

In June 2024, Netz was slapped by fitness influencer Bradley Martyn after Ronaldo jokingly snatched Martyn's hat during a collaborative "IRL" stream at Martyn's Zoo Culture gym. Martyn reacted instantly, hitting Netz across the face and demanding he leave. The two reconciled in July, with Netz later describing the slap as "part of the narrative" that helped boost his relevancy.

In December 2024, Netz faced criticism after being pulled over for speeding while driving his Porsche 911 GT3. He later addressed the incident in a video, explaining his interaction with the officer and cautioning followers about the dangers of reckless driving.

== Personal life ==
Netz is currently engaged to his long-time partner of two years, known online as Boba (real name Kimmy).

Netz was raised in a Jewish household but was not religious during his youth. More recently, he states he now believes in God.

== Awards and nominations ==
Awards and nominations received by Rani Netz
Ceremony	Year	Category	Work	Result	Ref.
The Streamer Awards	2024	Get Off Your A** Award (Best IRL Streamer)	—N/a	Nominated	
The Streamer Awards	2024	Best Content Organization	FaZe Clan	Won	
The Streamer Awards	2024	Best Marathon Stream	FaZe Subathon	Nominated	
The Streamer Awards	2025	Best Marathon Stream	FaZe Subathon	Nominated	
The Streamer Awards	2025	Best Content Organization	FaZe Clan	Won	
The Streamer Awards	2025	Best Reality Streamer	—N/a	Nominated	
The Streamer Awards	2026	Best Reality Streamer	—N/a	Won	
The Streamer Awards	2026	Best Streamer Collab	Stable Ronaldo, Jynxzi & LosPollosTV	Nominated	
The Streamer Awards	2026	Best Marathon Stream	Chained Together with Jynxzi & LosPollosTV	Won	
The Streamer Awards	2026	Streamer of the Year	—N/a	Nominated	
Streamer University	2026	Community builder		Won	

== See also ==
- List of most-subscribed Twitch channels
- List of Fortnite Championship Series winners
