= Ben Sharples =

American tennis player and actor (born 1974)

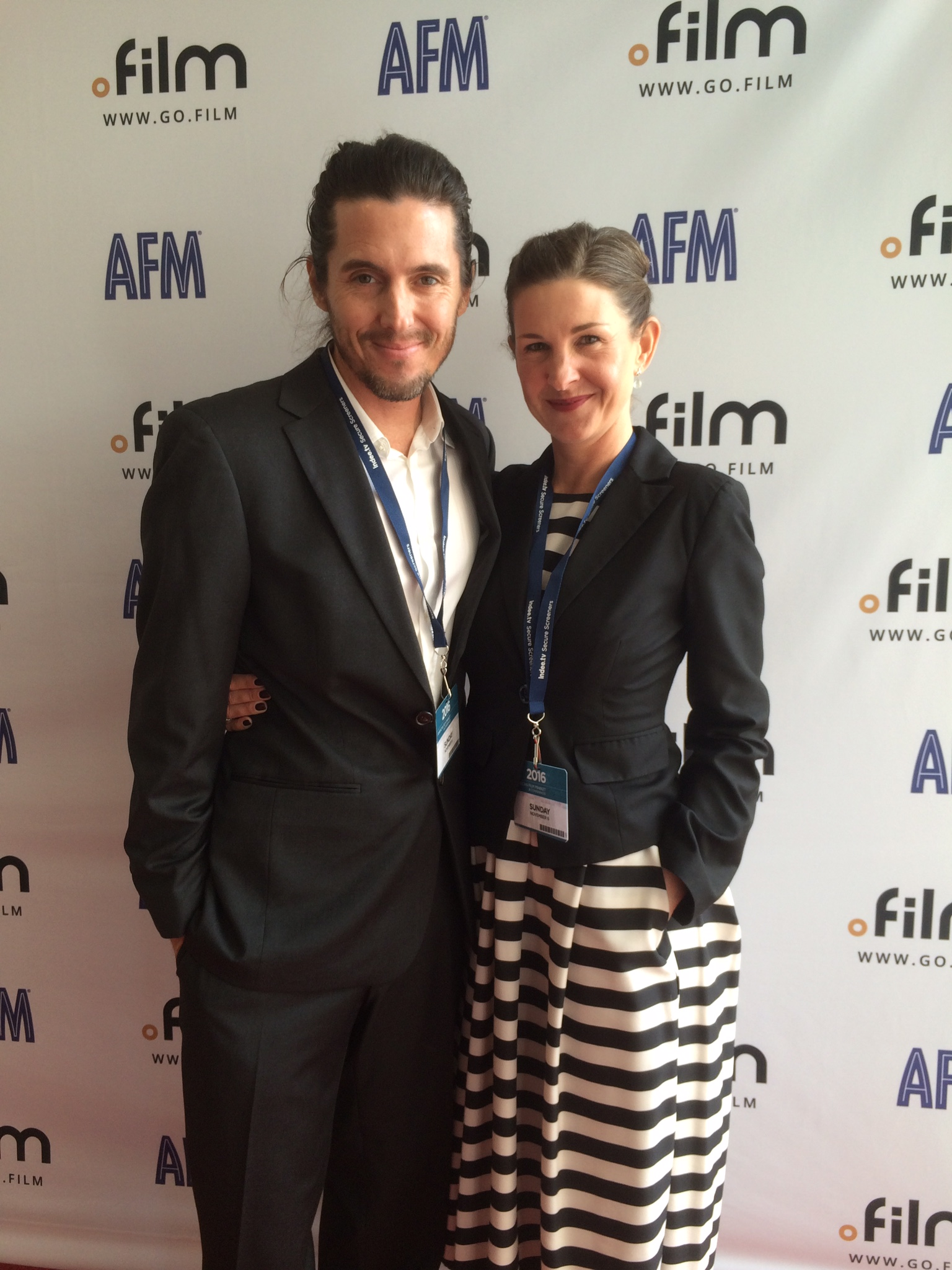
- Ben Sharples along with his wife, Marissa Hall
- Born: Benjamin Albert Sharples; July 22, 1974 (age 52)
- Education: UC Berkeley, American Conservatory Theater
- Occupations: Actor, screenwriter, producer, director
- Spouse: Marissa Hall (m. 2010)

Ben Sharples (born July 22, 1974) is an American actor, screenwriter, producer and director. He is known for his role as Jack Hafey, best friend of Brad and Pia Martin (Ryan Kwanten and Amy Smart), in Takashi Shimizu’s horror movie Flight 7500.

== Early life ==
Sharples grew up in Manhattan Beach, CA and attended Crossroads School in Santa Monica, CA, where he was a student of influential film lecturer Jim Hosney. He started taking acting classes while at the University of California, Berkeley then received more formal acting training from the American Conservatory Theater MFA Program.

An accomplished tennis player, Sharples was awarded Rookie of the Year and Most Valuable Player three years in a row by the Crossroads School tennis team. He finished his junior career ranked in the top twenty in Southern California and went on to play for the U.C. Berkeley men's tennis team for four years. He coached professional tennis player Zack Fleishman at the US Open in 2011.

== Career ==
In 2007, Sharples played real estate mogul Stephen in the underground romantic comedy hit film X’s & O’s, reported by The New York Times to be downloaded over 150,000 times in one week. He also appeared in the season three opening episode of 90210 as a professional tennis player who takes out Teddy Montgomery. Ben starred in the dark comedy short film Time Capsule, which premiered at the Regards sur le Cinéma du Monde in Rouen, France, and he played a drug addicted thief in the heist short Blue Plate, an official selection of the Downtown Film Festival Los Angeles.

== Films ==
Year	Title	Role	Notes
2006	I'll Believe You	Ned Firewall	
2007	X's & O's	Stephen	
2008	Ball Don't Lie	Businessman	
2014	Alien Abduction	Agent	
2014	Flight 7500	Jack Hafey	
2017	Gentlemen's Fury	Aaron Faust	Also director, writer, and producer

== Television ==
Year	Title	Role	Notes
2021	Buried in the Backyard	Bill Stevens	Episode: "Saint and Sinner"
2023	Gentlemen's Fury: Reloaded	Aaron Faust	8 episodes; also director, writer, and producer
