= Joseph Peller =

- Born: 1953 (age 72–73)
- Education: University of Toronto; Art Students League of New York; National Academy of Design
- Occupations: Painter, educator
- Website: josephpeller.com

Joseph Peller (born 1953) is an artist; he is also a teacher at the Art Students League of New York.

== Education ==
Initially Peller studied with Canadian artist A.K. Scott, a pupil of the American painters Charles W. Hawthorne and George Bellows. While studying at the School of Architecture at the University of Toronto, he worked with artists Kenneth Forbes and Cleeve Horne.

In New York City, Peller studied with Ronald Sherr at the National Academy of Design and Thomas Fogarty Jr., Roberto De Lamonicam and Hilary Holmes at the Art Students League, where in 1985 he received a Revson Foundation Grant.

== Career ==
Peller has also taught at the New York Academy of Art.
