= Maya Higa =

American conservationist and internet personality (born 1998)

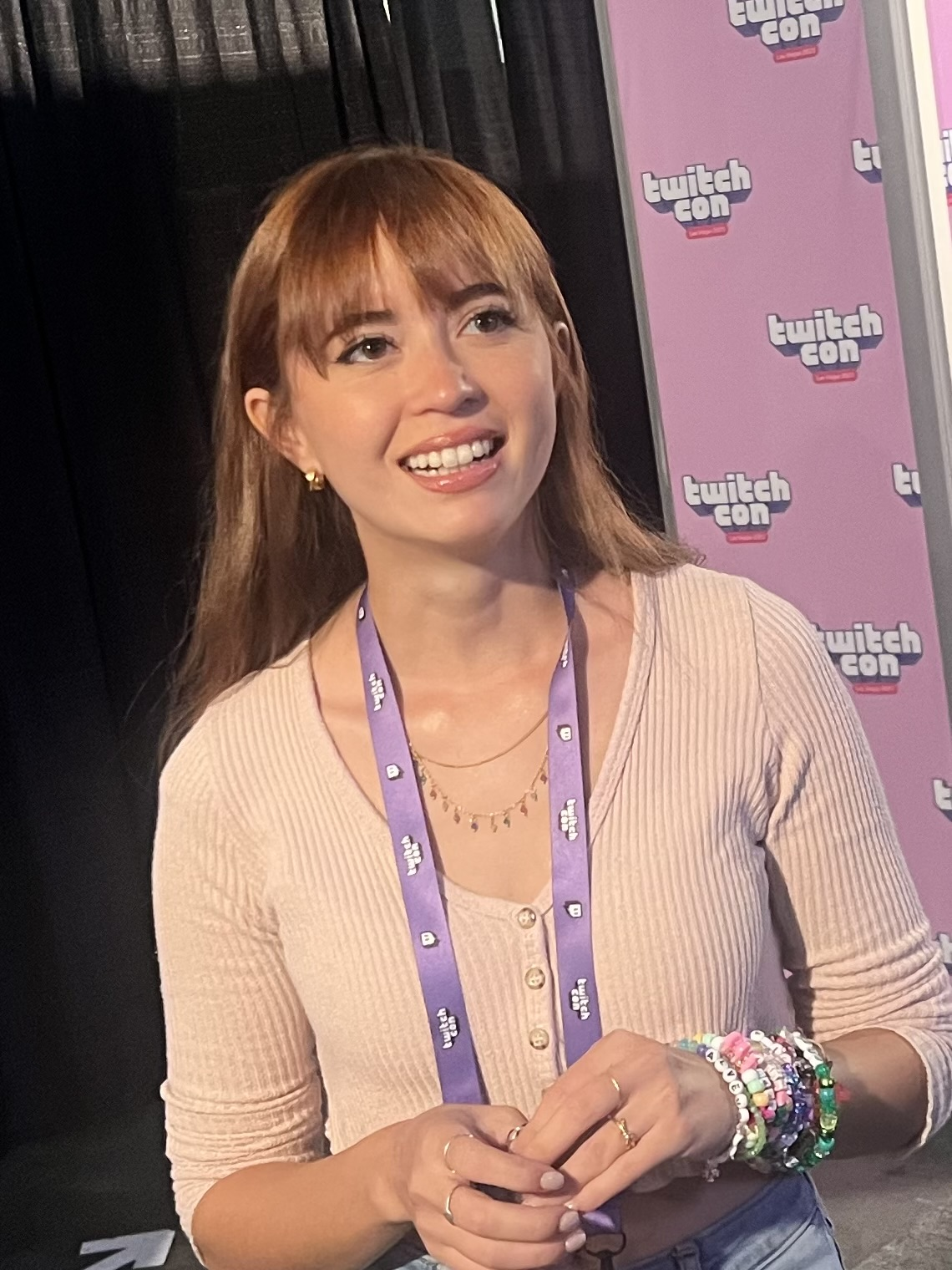
- Higa at TwitchCon Las Vegas in 2023
- Born: Maya Elaine Higa; May 24, 1998 (age 28); California, U.S.
- Education: California Polytechnic State University, San Luis Obispo (BS)
- Occupations: Twitch streamer; YouTuber; Conservationist; Sanctuary owner

Twitch information
- Channel: maya
- Years active: 2019–September 2022; November 2022–present
- Genres: Animal; education; IRL; reaction; singing
- Followers: 1,002,336

YouTube information
- Channel: Maya
- Years active: 2019–present
- Genres: Animal; education; reaction; vlog
- Subscribers: 1.23 million (main channel); 1.49 million (combined) (Note: Subscribers, broken down by channel: 1.23 million (Maya) 215 thousand (Maya Daily) 23.9 thousand (Maya Clips) 24.7 thousand (Maya Vods))
- Views: 303.29 million (main channel); 391.68 million (combined) (Note: Views, broken down by channel: 303.296 million (Maya) 60.171 million (Maya Daily) 23.407 million (Maya Clips) 4.815 million (Maya Vods))
- Last updated: May 24, 2026
- Website: Personal; Alveus Sanctuary

Maya Elaine Higa (born May 24, 1998) is an American conservationist, wildlife educator, Twitch streamer, and YouTuber. She is the founder of Alveus Sanctuary, a non-profit wildlife sanctuary and virtual education center based in Austin, Texas.

Higa started streaming on Twitch in 2019 and gained popularity for her content related to animals, conservation, and education. She has been recognized for integrating livestreaming with wildlife conservation and educational outreach. In 2021, she held a 21-hour charity stream that raised over $500,000 to establish her non-profit exotic animal sanctuary and virtual education center, Alveus Sanctuary.

Through her livestreams, Higa had raised more than US$7.5 million for conservation causes by 2026. In 2025, she won the League of Their Own award at the 2025 Streamer Awards, and in 2026 she became the first Twitch streamer to deliver a TED Talk at TED2026. As of May 2026, she has over one million followers on Twitch and 1.16 million subscribers on YouTube.

== Early life and education ==
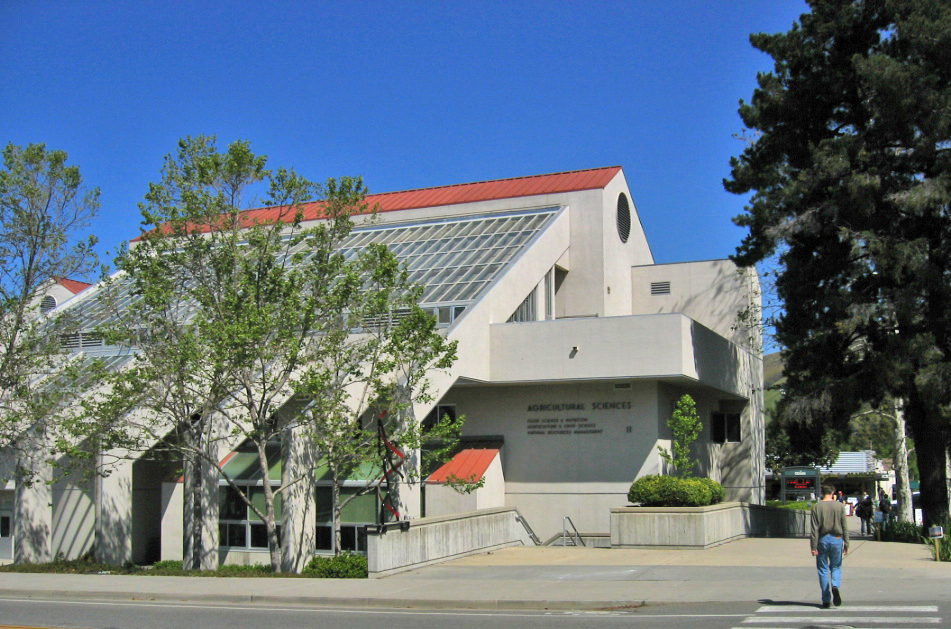
The Agricultural Sciences Building in Cal Poly, San Luis Obispo, where Higa studied agricultural education and communication

Maya Elaine Higa was born to a Japanese-Okinawan father and an American mother in Northern California on May 24, 1998, and grew up there on a farm as the youngest sibling with her parents, two brothers, and a sister.

She attended California Polytechnic State University in San Luis Obispo, graduating with a bachelor's degree in agricultural education and communication in June 2020. During her time at college, she worked for Zoo to You Conservation Ambassadors, Charles Paddock Zoo, and Free Flight Exotic Bird Sanctuary as an intern, doing outreach education and exotic animal husbandry.

== Career ==
=== 2019–2020: Early streaming career and initial popularity ===
Higa began streaming on Twitch in February 2019, after her streamer friends encouraged her to do so after they saw a clip of her singing on her Instagram. She originally started streaming in the music category on Twitch and did mainly singing content. She said that the reason she started doing singing streams was because she wanted to get more comfortable singing in front of people. Early in her streaming career, she saw significant growth after a falconry livestream clip with her juvenile red-tailed hawk named Bean went viral on Reddit around April 2019. In May 2019, she gained media attention from local news after she celebrated her 21st birthday by holding a charity stream for the 5 Cities Homeless Coalition, a local homeless coalition that she previously volunteered for. As her fame grew, her streams evolved to encompass a wider range of activities other than music, such as falconry, along with spreading conservation awareness.

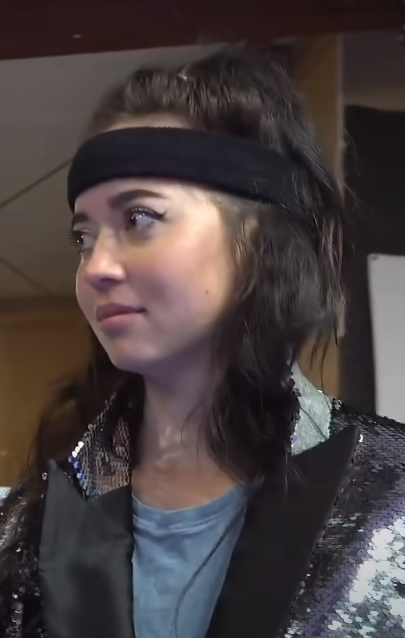
Higa in 2020 during a livestream

In July 2019, Higa started the Conservation Cast, a podcast where viewers learn about animals and gather information from experts such as conservationists, wildlife enthusiasts, and scientific communicators. The podcast has also featured speakers from organizations such as the American Eagle Foundation, Save the Rhino, the Exotic Feline Rescue Center, and the Dian Fossey Gorilla Fund. The podcast has raised more than US$92,000 with 63 episodes for wildlife protection organizations around the globe.

Higa created her YouTube channel, Maya, on August 8, 2019. At the beginning, she mostly uploaded her Twitch livestream highlights, such as her IRL streams and vlog content.

In October 2020, Higa became a part of the board of directors for a wildlife rehabilitation center in Central Texas. Her role focuses on raptor rehabilitation and husbandry.

=== 2021–2022: Founding of Alveus Sanctuary and hiatus ===
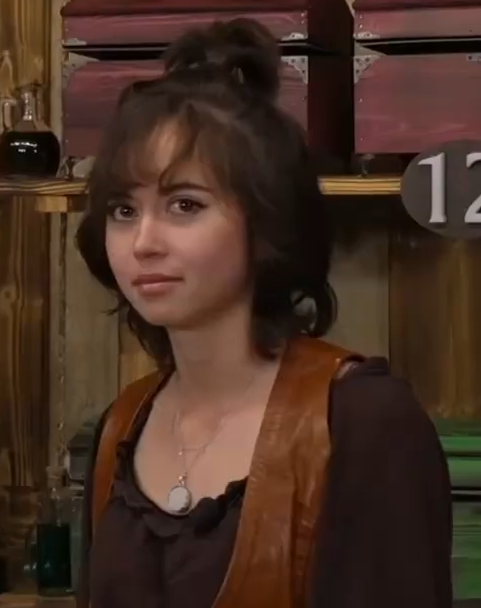
Higa in 2021 during a livestream

In 2021, Bloomberg described Higa as part of a growing wave of female Twitch streamers gaining prominence through non-gaming and personality-driven livestream content. On February 10, 2021, Higa held a 21-hour charity stream for her newly founded non-profit exotic animal sanctuary and virtual education center known as Alveus Sanctuary. The stream was highlighted by an auction that sold off items such as a golden shovel owned by Sodapoppin, Gucci loafers owned by T-Pain, and a signed jersey from xQc. The most expensive item auctioned off was a 1-hour gaming session with streamer and former professional CS:GO player Shroud, purchased by fellow streamer Ludwig Ahgren for US$53,000. Shortly after reaching her goal of US$500,000, Higa shaved her head, fulfilling a promise she made a few weeks prior. All together, she raised US$573,000. On the same month, Higa officially joined the Make-a-Wish Foundation in Central and South Texas as a governing board member.

On March 1, 2022, Higa was featured in the second annual World Woman Hour, a digital series presented by the World Woman Foundation dedicated to highlighting 60 inspirational stories of women from all walks of life. On March 12, 2022, Higa co-hosted the first Streamer Awards show with QTCinderella at The Fonda Theater in Los Angeles, California. On March 30, 2022, Higa started Conservation Uncharted, a travel series of livestreams focused on different aspects of wildlife conservation, with a whale-watching trip joined by Whale and Dolphin Conservation, raising over US$4,000 in under two hours.

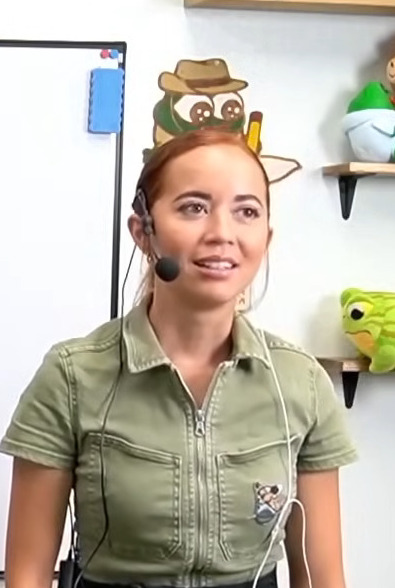
Higa in 2023 during a livestream at Alveus Sanctuary

On September 19, 2022, Higa and Mizkif were accused by fellow Twitch streamer Trainwreckstv of downplaying and covering up an incident where fellow streamer CrazySlick allegedly sexually assaulted female streamer AdrianahLee. Higa denied covering up sexual assault, apologized for her involvement, and took a temporary hiatus from streaming. After a two-month hiatus, Higa returned to streaming in November 2022. Higa stated her intentions to stream less on her main channel and reorient efforts into producing educational conservation content for Alveus Sanctuary.

=== 2023–present: Mainstream recognition and conservation expansion ===
As of January 2023, Higa has raised over US$1,000,000 collectively from viewer donations using Twitch. On January 21, 2023, Higa was announced as an ambassador for the Whale and Dolphin Conservation. On April 4, 2023, Higa collaborated with Twitch and hosted Nerve Center presented by Ally, a sponsored education show based around Alveus Sanctuary with several online creators, including Daily Dose of Internet, Dareon, and Caroline Kwan. On October 1, 2023, Higa co-hosted The Gala for Good charity auction stream with QTCinderella. Over US$250,000 was raised for rainforest conservation at the event, with donations going to five non-profit environmental organizations, including Rainforest Alliance, World Wildlife Fund, Rainforest Foundation US, and Rainforest Trust.

According to Stream Hatchet, a data intelligence company focusing on live streaming analytics, Higa was the 10th most-watched female streamer across all platforms for the month of April 2024 and later appeared again as the fifth most-watched female streamer across all platforms for the month of May 2024.

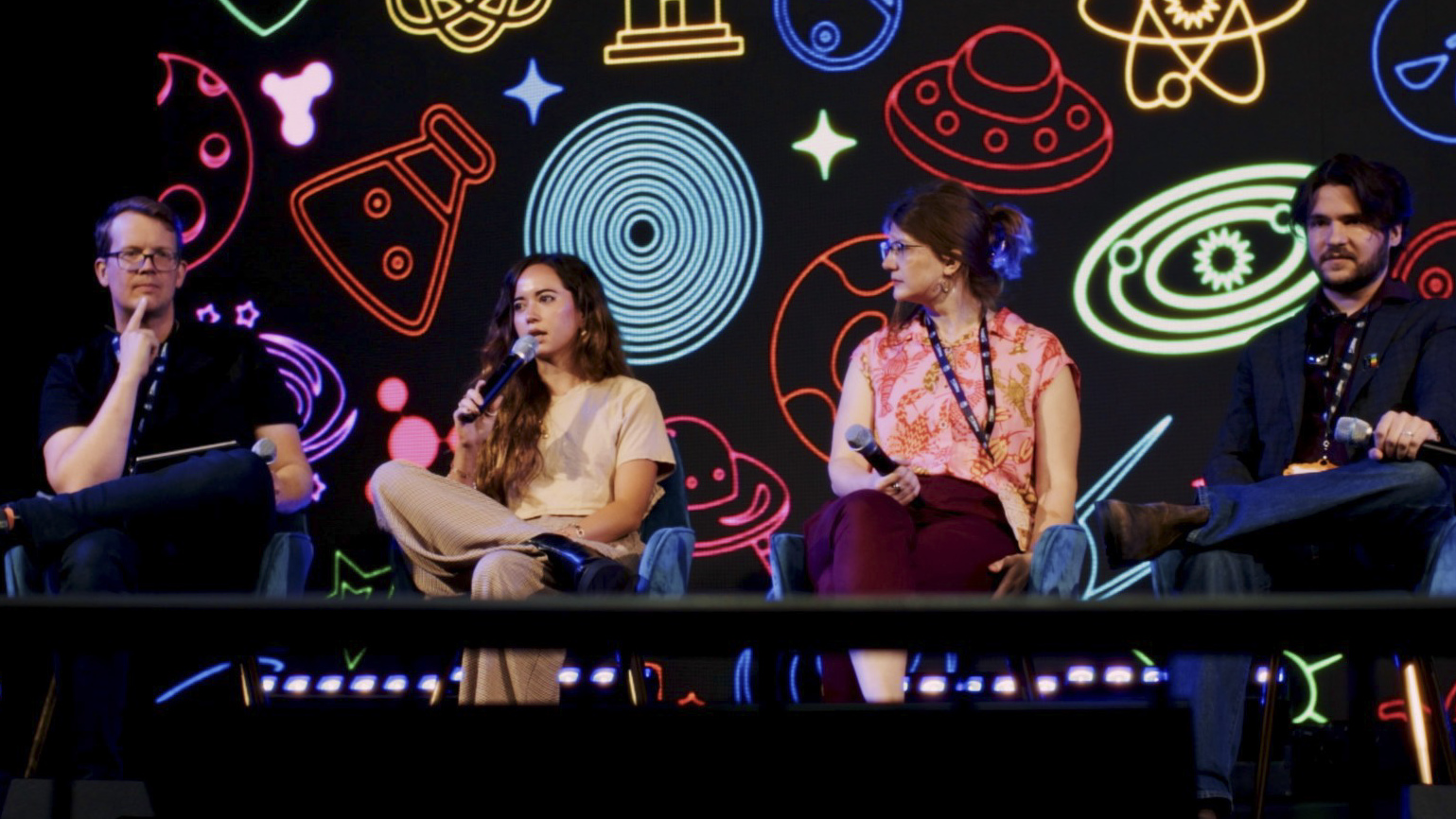
Higa (second from left) speaking during a panel discussion at Open Sauce 2025 alongside Hank Green, Emily Graslie, and TierZoo

On January 22, 2025, Higa reached one million subscribers on YouTube. In March 2025, she was a speaker at South by Southwest (SXSW), where she discussed wildlife conservation and the role of digital media on environmental education. In October 2025, Higa announced a massive expansion of her sanctuary called the Alveus Research & Recovery Institute (ARRI). She raised over $500,000 in a single day to fund the project, which aims to breed and release endangered North American species, starting with wolf species. In December 2025, Higa returned as co-host of the 2025 Streamer Awards alongside QTCinderella. At the ceremony, she was nominated for League of Their Own and Best Streamed Series, winning the former award.

In February 2026, Higa was selected as one of eight creators to collaborate with National Geographic on conservation-focused digital media initiatives. In April 2026, she collaborated with the World Wildlife Fund for its "Give an Hour for Earth" campaign and appeared on the organization's Nature Breaking podcast, where she discussed livestreaming as a tool for environmental education and conservation outreach. Later that month, Higa became the first Twitch streamer to deliver a TED Talk at TED2026 in Vancouver, Canada. Her talk, titled "The Wildlife Sanctuary You Can Visit from Anywhere", focused on the role of livestreaming and digital media in wildlife conservation and education. During the talk, Higa stated that she had raised more than US$7.5 million for conservation causes since 2019.

In July 2026, Higa was initially announced as a professor for the second installment of Kai Cenat's Streamer University creator bootcamp. However, she withdrew from the event prior to its start due to a scheduling conflict with a previously planned wildlife conservation commitment involving sperm whales.

== Other ventures ==
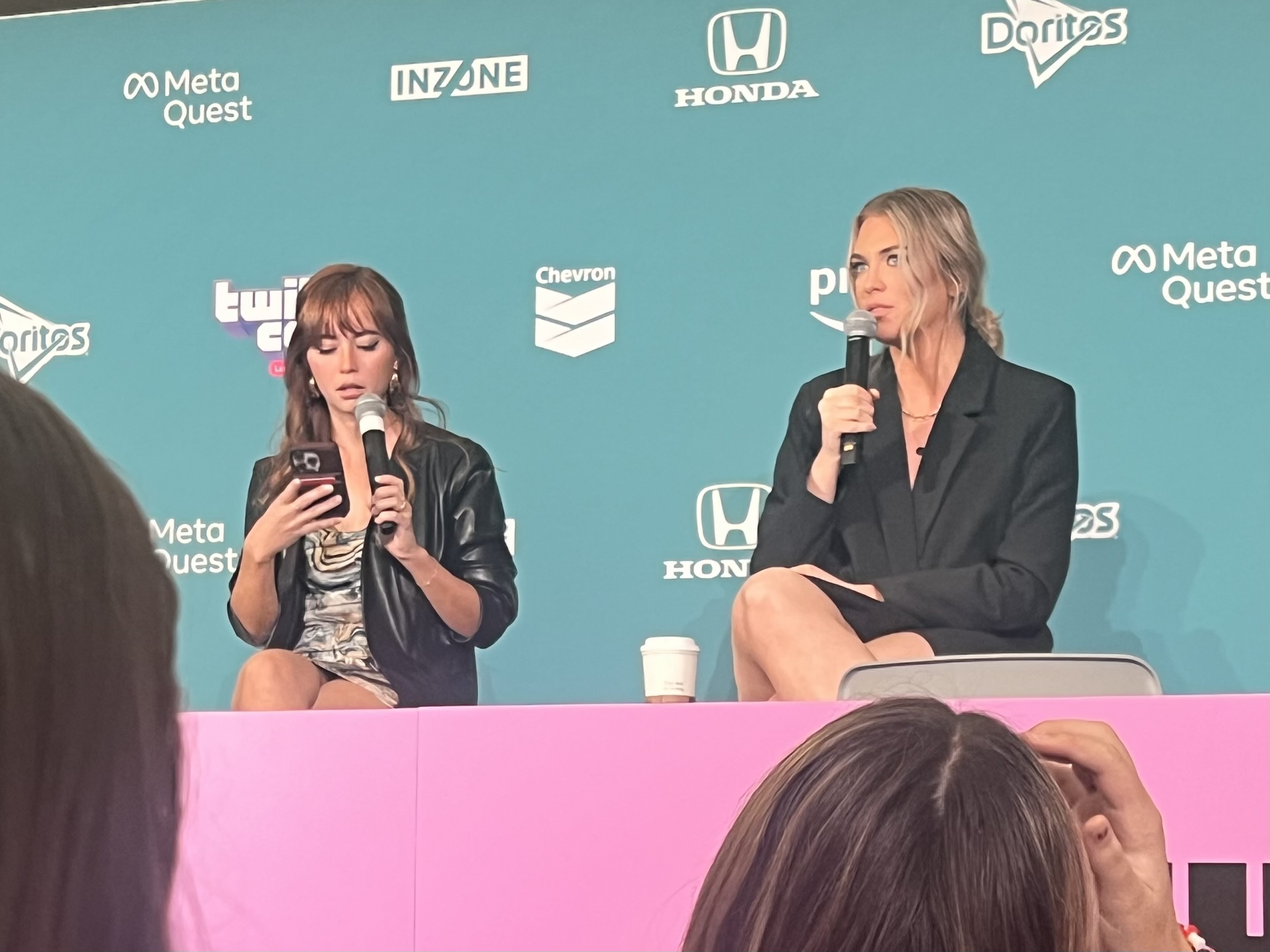
Higa (left) speaking during a TwitchCon panel for Wine About It at TwitchCon Las Vegas in 2023 alongside QTCinderella

=== Wine About It Podcast ===
In November 2021, Higa began to co-host the Wine About It podcast alongside her friend and fellow Twitch streamer, QTCinderella. Wine About It went on hiatus in September 2022 after Higa announced her "indefinite" break from online content creation, a decision which stemmed from the backlash she received for her alleged involvement in covering up a sexual assault scandal. On March 11, 2023, the duo announced the return of the podcast. On July 2, 2025, it was announced that Higa would leave the Wine About It podcast to further focus on her conservation work at Alveus Sanctuary.

=== World's Wildest Podcast ===
In May 2024, Higa started the World's Wildest podcast with Connor O’Brien, the Director of Operations at Alveus Sanctuary, a podcast dedicated to highlighting the wildest species in the animal kingdom. In October 2025, they announced the end of World's Wildest due to time constraints and the expansion of Alveus Sanctuary.

== Personal life ==
Higa previously lived in California before moving to Austin, Texas, in May 2020. She currently lives in a custom-built 390-square-foot tiny house on site at Alveus Sanctuary.

Between 2019 and 2021, Higa was in a relationship with fellow Twitch streamer Mizkif. On September 14, 2021, Mizkif announced on Twitter that he and Higa had ended their relationship.

In August 2026, she announced her engagement to her long-term boyfriend. In September of the same year, she came out as bisexual during a stream, while talking about the importance of representation.

== Awards and nominations ==
Ceremony	Year	Category	Nominated Work	Result	Ref.
The Streamer Awards	2025	League of Their Own	—N/a	Won	
The Streamer Awards	2025	Best Streamed Series	Alveus Tours	Nominated	
The Streamer Awards	2026	League of Their Own	—N/a	Nominated	
The Streamer Awards	2026	Best Streamer Collab	Maya Higa & Adapt	Won	
The Streamer Awards	2026	The Sapphire Award	—N/a	Nominated	

== Filmography ==
Web roles
Year	Title	Role	Network	Notes	Ref.
2021	TwitchGaming: Hivemind	Herself	Twitch	Participant; Season 2: Episode 9	
2022	Name Your Price	Herself	Twitch	Guest; One episode	

== Discography ==
=== Singles ===
==== As a featured artist ====
List of singles as a featured artist
Year	Title	Album	Details	Ref.
2019	"I" (with AtotheT)	Echos From The Suicidal Soldier	Release date: May 11, 2019; Producer: Fiend	
2021	"Shoot for the Stars" (with Mitch Jones)	Broken	Release date: December 3, 2021; Producer: SMLE and Used Beats	
