= Zfg =

American speedrunner and streamer

ZFG
- Born: August 18, 1994 (age 32); California, U.S.
- Occupations: Speedrunner; streamer

Twitch information
- Channel: Zfg1
- Years active: 2009–present
- Genre: Gaming
- Game: The Legend of Zelda: Ocarina of Time
- Followers: 223 thousand

Zfg (stylized as ZFG and zfg, previously known as ZeldaFreakGlitcha) is an American speedrunner and streamer known for his The Legend of Zelda: Ocarina of Time (1998) gameplay.

== Career ==
In 2012, Zfg (then-known as ZeldaFreakGlitcha) was the first to use the "Ganondoor" exploit to set a world record in The Legend of Zelda: Ocarina of Time (1998) under any completion percent. The exploit allows players to teleport from the first dungeon to the last, skipping most of the game. His record was timed at 34:59 (mm:ss), cutting almost 12 minutes off from the previous record. He and other runners (including Narcissa Wright) continued to lower the record time with constant improvements to the Ganondoor route.

In 2017, Zfg was one of the first players to record a successful attempt at a glitch in Ocarina of Time that would allow players to equip items they normally could not use. That same year, he also co-commentated on the first "All Dungeon, No Doors" run of Ocarina of Time; beating the game and its dungeons without opening any doors. Another runner, TaylorTotFTW created the run using tool-assisted speedrun (TAS) software. It debuted live on Zfg's Twitch channel.

In 2018, Zfg helped construct a list of lesser-known secrets in Ocarina of Time for IGN. It was put together to commemorate the 20th anniversary of the game and featured techniques and mechanics known to speedrunners of the game. That same year, he also completed randomised 100% runs Ocarina of Time using a modified version of the original game that unpredictably adjusts variables and create special world-states. Randomised runs can change where doors and exits lead and where items are located.

In 2019, Zfg produced and released a TAS of Ocarina of Time which showcased what a humanly-perfect run of the 100% completion category would be. On its live debut, the run finished nearly 15 minutes faster than his then-current record of 3:53:33.

In 2020, after a break from running the 100% category, Zfg took back the world record for it with a time of 3:43:44, fourteen seconds faster than the previous record. At the end of 2020, he completed a run of Ocarina of Time in the 100% (SRM) category with a time of 3 hours, 12 minutes and 55 seconds.

Zfg has run Ocarina of Time at Awesome Games Done Quick (AGDQ) several times.

In October 2021, Zfg's comments about the inclusion of Nintendo 64 games under the Nintendo Switch Online service garnered attention. Writing about Ocarina of Time's emulation and input lag, he stated that the game "on Switch is so bad it might be worse than [Wii U Virtual Console's version]." Statements made by Zfg, alongside Kentucky-based speedrunner Toufool, were notable as both were renowned within Ocarina of Time's speedrunning community.

=== Sub-four hour speedrun ===
In 2018, Zfg accomplished the first 100% speedrun of Ocarina of Time under four hours. His record was recorded at 3:58:45. It had been more than five years since the last hour barrier was crossed. At the time, Zfg had held the 100% record since March 2015. He was able to lower the time to under four hours with newly discovered glitches and shortcuts discovered within a month of the record. In total, Zfg stated that the discovered glitches and exploits lowered five minutes off of the run. Zfg posted a video on YouTube explaining the discovered breakthroughs in further detail. In an interview with Kotaku, Zfg wrote that before the shortcuts, achieving a run under four hours was "the dream but was just barely out of reach" and breaking that barrier "was going to be a big deal". Zfg went on further to explain that the optimal route is continually changing.

=== Arbitrary code execution ===
Zfg interacting with Arwings he spawned in using arbitrary code execution

In January 2020, Zfg showcased an example of arbitrary code execution (ACE) in Ocarina of Time by spawning in Arwings from Star Fox 64 (1997) into the game. The Arwings were used by the game developers to test the Z-targeting mechanics and flight patterns of the Fire Temple boss Volvagia. The developers subsequently left the Arwings in the game code, only being able to be spawned back in with cheat devices such as a Gameshark. Zfg spawned in the Arwings without the use of mods or cheating devices; he used an unedited ROM cartridge of the game, playing on a standard Nintendo 64 console.

Arbitrary code execution allows speedrunners to force the game to load filenames as game code. Runners also used ACE to complete the game in under 13 minutes by warping to the end credits, load items into treasure chests, or change their physical positions. Zfg explained that by performing ACE three times, each with different specific filenames, runners can remove the character limit of the file name. Without it, they can type in any payload; allowing them to do practically anything. This method is known as "Total Control". Zfg used it to turn all doors in Kakariko Village into Arwings, which swarm and attack the player.

== Reputation ==
Zfg is one of the most well-known speedrunners. Writing for GQ, David Levesley noted him as "one of the big names in [speedrunning]" and as a "[speedrun] titan." While covering his Human Theory TAS, Kotaku's Heather Alexandra stated that he was "one of the most accomplished Ocarina of Time speedrunners." Adam Newell of Dot Esports included Zfg in his list of the ten best speedrunners on Twitch, noting him as a "technical streamer" who often gives viewers insight into how he thinks and what is going on in a speedrun. Shacknews called him "an absolute madman at Ocarina of Time."
