= Peller (streamer) =

Nigerian streamer and YouTuber (born 2005)

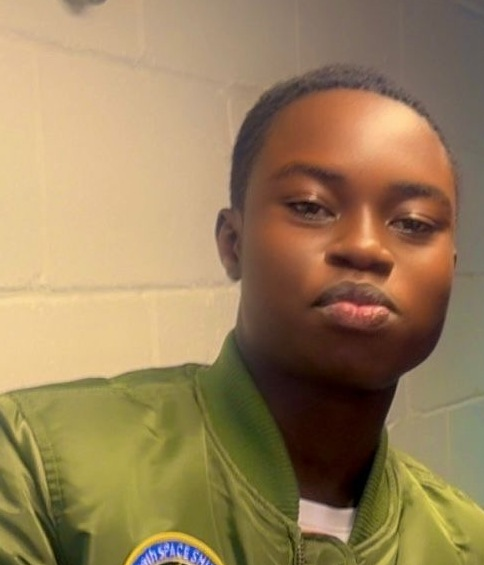
- Peller in London (2025)
- Born: Habeeb Hamzat; May 10, 2005 (age 21); Ikorodu, Lagos, Nigeria
- Occupations: Online streamer; content creator
- Years active: late 2020–present
- Spouse: Amoudu Elizabeth Aminata (m. 2026)

TikTok information
- Page: Peller
- Followers: 18 million

YouTube information
- Channel: Peller
- Years active: 2022–present
- Genre: Streamer
- Subscribers: 458 thousands
- Views: 18.1 million
- Last updated: 9 November 2026

Habeeb Hamzat (born 10 May 2005), known professionally as Peller, is a Nigerian online streamer and content creator. Peller emerged online around 2023, known for his sarcastic manner and reluctance while streaming. He currently holds the highest-viewed stream in Africa with 512k views, surpassing his previous record of 260k views, which featured popular Nigerian artist Olamide. He won the "Best Content Creator" at the Trace Awards & Festival in 2024.

== Early life ==
Peller was born on May 10,2005. He attended Providence Primary School for his primary education and later Frontrunner Academy for his secondary education.

== Career ==
Inspired by Kai Cenat, Fanum, IShowSpeed, and Duke, Peller launched his career in 2021. Initially, his efforts garnered little attention, but he persevered. In 2024, he launched his comedy series, Peller's Palava, after collaborating with Nigerian TikToker Jadrolita (Javis). His popularity soared when Nigerian-Canadian rapper Dax joined him on a live stream. Additionally, rapper Olamide co-signed him during live sessions. Peller's breakthrough culminated in winning "Best Content Creator" at the Trace Awards Africa on 8 July 2024. In October 2026, Leadership reported that TikTok had invited Peller to visit its office in the United Kingdom after he announced the invitation during a livestream.

== Personal life ==
In 2025, Peller announced his conversion to Christianity from Islam, attributing his decision partly to childhood trauma experienced at a traditional Quranic school, which had gradually alienated him from his former faith.

On 21 January 2026, popular American streamer, Darren Jason Watkins Jr, professionally known as IShowSpeed, held a birthday livestream tour in Nigeria. Peller was seen attempting to approach IShowSpeed during the livestream, but was intercepted by the streamer's bodyguard. Some hours later, Peller chased after IShowSpeed's convoy on a horse, trying to get the American streamer's attention, but was ignored.

On 29 July 2026, Peller married fellow content creator Amoudu Elizabeth Aminata, professionally known as Jarvis, in a court wedding.

On 1 August 2026, Peller and fellow content creator Amoudu Elizabeth Aminata, popularly known as Jarvis, held their traditional wedding ceremony in Lagos. Their white wedding ceremony was held on 8 August 2026.

== Awards and nominations ==
Awards and nominations for Peller
Year	Award	Category	Result	Ref.
2024	Trace Awards & Festival	Best Content Creator	Won	
2024	Pulse Influencer Awards	TikTok Influencer of the Year	Won	
2024	Pulse Influencer Awards	Next Gen Influencer of the Year	Won	
2024	Trendupp Awards	Emerging Force	Won	
2025	Silverbird Man of the Year Awards	Influential Influencer	Won	
2025	African Golden Awards	Best TikToker of the Year	Won	
2026	The Humour Awards	Fans' Favourite	Won	
2026	African Muzik Magazine Awards	Best Influencer	Nominated	
2026	The Streamer Awards	Best International Streamer	Pending	
