= TheBurntPeanut =

American VTuber and live streamer

- TheBurntPeanut's logo
- Born: Texas, U.S.
- Occupations: Live streamer; YouTuber; virtual YouTuber
- Years active: 2019–present
- Known for: Peanut avatar; extraction shooters
- Awards: Best VTuber (2025); Best FPS Streamer (2025)

Kick information
- Channel: TheBurntPeanut
- Years active: 2026–present
- Genres: Gaming; comedy
- Games: ARC Raiders; Escape from Tarkov
- Followers: 121.8 thousand

Twitch information
- Channel: theburntpeanut
- Years active: 2019–present
- Genres: Gaming; comedy
- Games: ARC Raiders; Escape from Tarkov
- Followers: 2.4 million

YouTube information
- Channel: TheBurntPeanut
- Years active: 2024–present
- Genres: Gaming; comedy
- Subscribers: 2.05 million
- Views: 620 million
- Last updated: August 10, 2026
- Website: theburntpeanut.store

TheBurntPeanut, or simply BurntPeanut, is an American live streamer and content creator. Known for using an animated peanut avatar rather than showing his real face, he gained popularity in 2024 and mostly plays extraction shooters such as Escape from Tarkov and ARC Raiders.

TheBurntPeanut started content creation in 2019 with gaming guides for games like Escape from Tarkov. In 2025, he won "Best FPS Streamer" and "Best VTuber" at the Streamer Awards, although he refers to himself as a "PTuber". TheBurntPeanut was nominated for "Content Creator of the Year" at the Game Awards 2025.

He was featured in the video game Fortnite Battle Royale as a "sprite" as a part of a season in 2026. He was among the Streamer of the Year nominees for the 2026 Esports Awards. In 2026, at the Streamer Awards, he was nominated for "Best FPS Streamer", "Best VTuber", and "Gamer of the Year".

== Career ==
TheBurntPeanut started streaming on Twitch in 2019, mainly focusing on gaming guides and tutorials for games such as Escape from Tarkov to a small following. Following a hiatus, he returned to streaming and adopted the "TheBurntPeanut" persona, represented by a peanut Snapchat-like filter; this also led him to become more of a comedy gaming streamer. During livestreams, TheBurntPeanut became known for saying terms such as "Goop!" when finding loot in video games.

In 2024, TheBurntPeanut gained a significant amount of growth in viewers following his changes and interacting in in-game voice chat in Escape from Tarkov and other games. In mid-2025, he expanded his content to more extraction shooter games, such as ARC Raiders.

In November, a community war started in ARC Raiders with TheBurntPeanut and another streamer by the name of HutchMF, leading to other creators such as Ninja and TimTheTatman split on joining sides, with some joining TheBurntPeanut's team "The Bungulators" and others joining HutchMF. The war ended via a Discord call with TheBurntPeanut winning. In September 2025, TheBurntPeanut made a guest appearance on the Around The Bar Podcast which accumulated over 2 million views on YouTube.

At the 2025 Streamer Awards, TheBurntPeanut won the "Best VTuber" award, beating out streamers such as Ironmouse and Usada Pekora; he also won the "Best FPS Streamer." After winning the award, various individuals were upset in response to Ironmouse's loss, where she responded saying, "The hate towards TheBurntPeanut is cringe," to which TheBurntPeanut later responded, saying, "It's not my community." Also in 2025, he was nominated for "Content Creator of the Year" at The Game Awards 2025, although he was beaten out by another content creator.

In May 2025, TheBurntPeanut had a brief exchange with the X account for AT&T, successfully getting the brand to change its profile picture to TheBurntPeanut. This was reversed shortly after, with the Twitch streamer accusing "yacht owners and billionaires and stockholders and the rich" for pressuring AT&T.

In January 2026, TheBurntPeanut threaten to quit Arc Raiders due to their apparent cheating problems in-game. In February 2026, following the release of the video game Marathon, TheBurntPeanut played it on a live stream and responded to the wave negativity the game was receiving, saying, "Let them cook". In April 2026, ARC Raiders players created a "bounty system" that targets foul players, and at the top of the list was TheBurntPeanut, in which he was eliminated quickly. Also in April, the video game Rust had Twitch releases called "Peanut's Wasteland", which were themed around TheBurntPeanut. In May 2026, TheBurntPeanut was offered $1 million by YouTuber MrBeast to reveal his face to his viewers; he said no and stated, "The peanut avatar already is my real face."

Also in May, along with several other creators, TheBurntPeanut partnered with company Volt Factor. In 2026, he was featured as a "sprite" in the video game Fortnite Battle Royale; this received backlash from some of the Fortnite community, with people bringing up his past use of homophobic slurs on stream. In August 2026, TheBurntPeanut was announced as a Streamer of the Year nominee for the 2026 Esports Awards. In November 2026, TheBurntPeanut was in controversy after a developer of the 2016 video game Dead by Daylight gave him access to all the game's characters. TheBurntPeanut and Behaviour Interactive received backlash, and people online suggested it was "favoritism" and that his past behavior also "didn't look good". Behaviour Interactive, the team behind the game, responded by apologizing and removing all the items he was given access to.

== Awards and nominations ==
Awards	Year	Award	Result	Ref
The Game Awards	2025	Content Creator of the Year	Nominated	
The Streamer Awards	2025	Best VTuber	Won	
The Streamer Awards	2025	Best FPS Streamer	Won	
The Streamer Awards	2026	Best FPS Streamer	Nominated	
The Streamer Awards	2026	Best VTuber	Nominated	
The Streamer Awards	2026	Gamer of the Year	Nominated	
