= Emily D. Baker =

American legal YouTuber

- Baker in 2025

YouTube information
- Channel: Emily D. Baker
- Years active: 2006–present
- Genre: Vlogs
- Subscribers: 851 thousand
- Views: 227 million
- Last updated: 17 January 2026

Emily D. Baker is an American legal commentator, podcast host, and former deputy district attorney. She is best known for her YouTube channel and podcast, "The Emily Show," where she provides legal analysis and commentary on high-profile cases and pop culture events. She is a former Los Angeles County Deputy District Attorney, from 2005 until 2020.

== Early life and education ==
Baker was born on May 7, 1978, and grew up in Manhattan Beach, California. She earned her Juris Doctor degree from Southwestern Law School before beginning a career as a deputy district attorney. After passing the California bar in 2005, she began to practice law in Los Angeles.

== Career ==
=== Los Angeles County Deputy District Attorney ===
Baker served as a deputy district attorney in Los Angeles County from 2004 until 2020.

=== Legal commentary ===
After leaving her position as a deputy district attorney in 2020, Baker became a legal YouTube commentator. She became particularly well known during her coverage of the Johnny Depp v. Amber Heard trial. Her live streams of the trial attracted over 300,000 concurrent viewers.

Baker has two YouTube channels. One features livestreams, and on the other she hosts her podcast "The Emily Show." On both channels, she provides legal analysis and commentary on high-profile cases and pop culture events. Her YouTube channel is the number one outlet for live trial coverage.

Her app, "Law Nerd," on Google Play, has over 10,000 downloads. Her community, dubbed the same name, stays connected through the app and by commenting on her YouTube livestreams in live chats.

== Personal life ==
Baker moved to Nashville, Tennessee, with her husband, a dentist, and their two sons from Los Angeles, California, in 2020.

== Awards and nominations ==
Awards	Year	Category	Result	Ref.
The Streamer Awards	2026	League of Their Own	Nominated	
