= Aftermath (website) =

Independently owned video game website

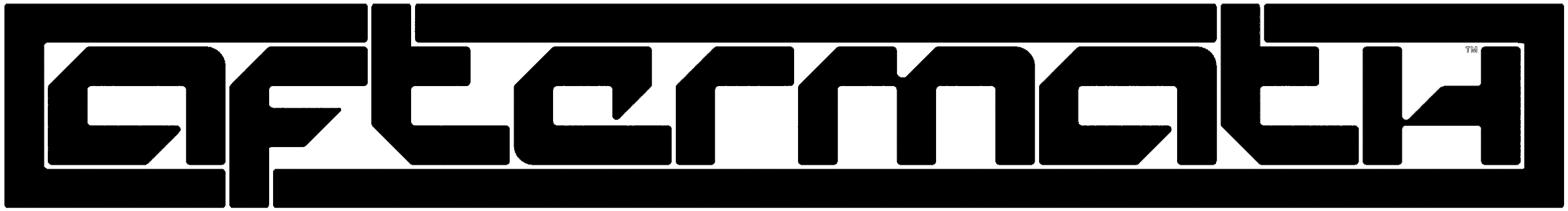

- Screenshot of Aftermath on August 14, 2024
- Website type: Gaming blog
- Website: aftermath.site
- Launched: November 2023; 2 years ago

Aftermath is an independently owned video game website and blog launched in 2023. The site was created and is owned by several former writers of other news websites. Alongside news about video games, the site also publishes content related to internet culture, and also manages a podcast. The site uses a subscription business model.

== Content ==
Aftermath is a video game website that primarily covers video games, the video game industry, and internet culture. The site also manages a podcast that covers additional subjects, such as 52 Pickup, which covers comic books. Alongside the site's main writers, it also has a number of "featured contributors" and freelance writers who publish content there. While other news websites primarily host advertisements to make profits, Aftermath uses a subscription business model that is required to access some of the site's content.

== History ==
In 2023, many news website divisions that covered video games were shut down, with several more laying off writers. These included the shutdowns of Waypoint (part of Vice Media) and Launcher (part of The Washington Post), and layoffs of several workers for Inverse, GameSpot, Destructoid, The Escapist, and others. In November 2023, several former writers of these sites, namely Nathan Grayson, Gita Jackson, Riley MacLeod, and Luke Plunkett, created Aftermath. All of the founders were former employees at Kotaku.
