= Glossary of 2020s slang =

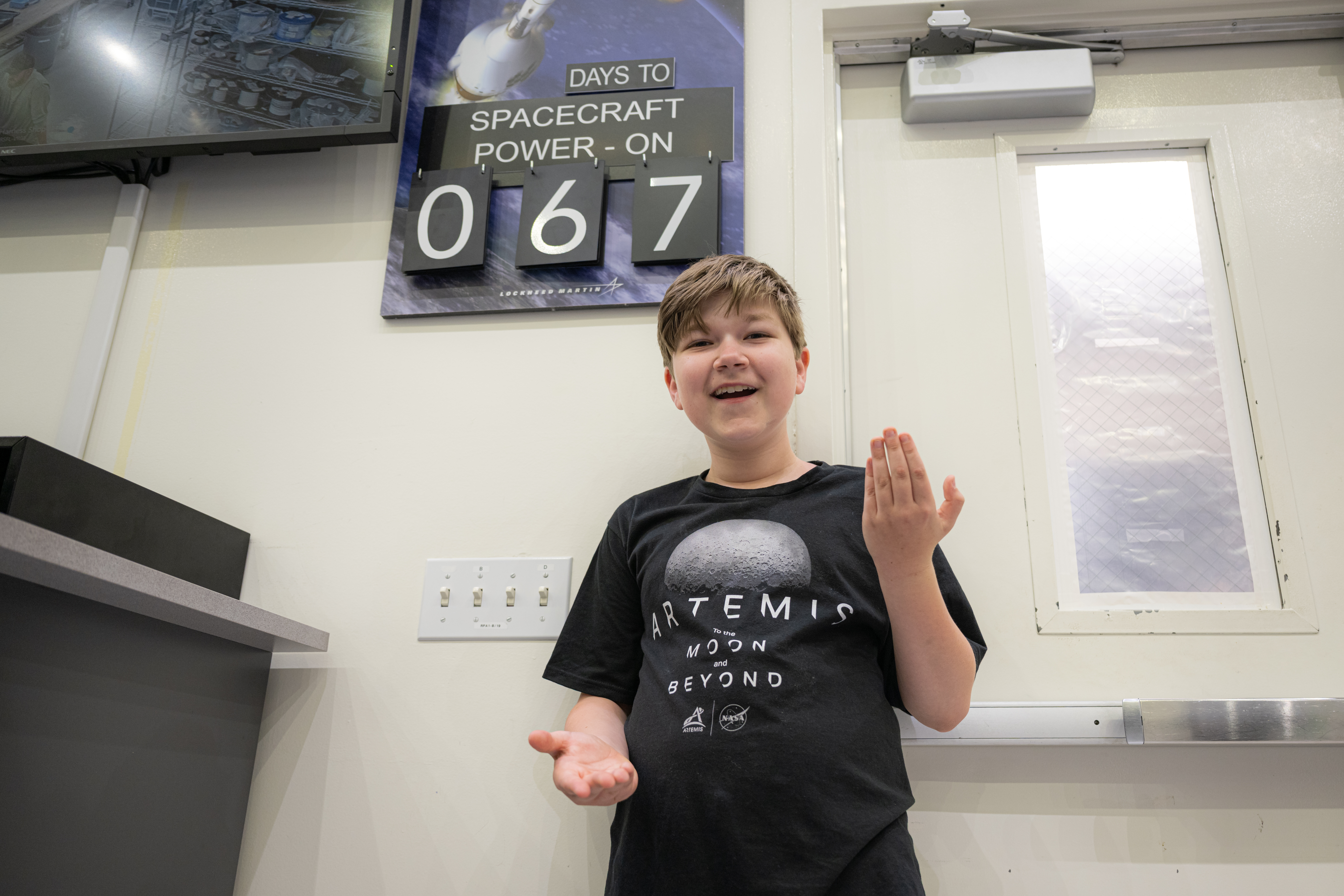
"6-7" became a slang term in March – November 2025.

English-language slang used or popularized in the 2020s, usually by Generation Z (Gen Z) or by Generation Alpha (Gen Alpha), differs from that of earlier generations. Ease of communication via social media and other internet outlets has facilitated its rapid proliferation, creating "an unprecedented variety of linguistic variation", according to Danielle Abril of The Washington Post. Self-deprecating irony is often a prevalent factor in its use.

Many Gen Z and Gen Alpha slang terms were not originally coined by their generation but were already in use or simply became more mainstream. Much of what is considered Gen Z and Gen Alpha slang originates from African-American Vernacular English, Black queer ball culture, and incel culture.

== A ==
Term	Definition	References
acoustic/artistic	Algospeak forms of the word "autistic." Used as insults to call someone stupid, in the same manner as "retarded" has come to be used.	
and I oop	Used to express shock, embarrassment, and/or amusement. Often associated with VSCO girls alongside 'sksksk'.	
aura	An individual's current reputation or charisma. Cultivating aura is known as aura farming.	
ate	To have performed well or extremely good at something.	

== B ==
Term	Definition	References
baddie	A confident, stylish, and attractive woman or girl.	
ball knowledge	niche or uncommon knowledge, usually niche references, often in pop culture. Alternative forms include "elite ball knowledge" or "knowing ball".	
based	Originated from rapper Lil B The BasedGod, who defined it as "...being yourself. Not being scared of what people think about you. Not being afraid to do what you wanna do." More contemporary use has been to express approval of someone or agreeing with another's opinion, similar to the usage of "W". The term is often used by the alt-right.	
basic	those who prefer mainstream products, trends, and music. Derived from the term "basic bitch".	
bar(s)	A lyric in a rap song that is considered excellent. A talented rapper may be said to "drop bars" or be "spitting bars", sometimes shortened to just "spitting".	
BDE	Abbreviation for "big dick energy": confidence and ease.	
Bean Soup Theory	A specific phenomenon described as a 'What about me' effect. An individual watches a video that doesn't pertain to them, but finds a way to make it about them anyway. Stems from a 2023 TikTok recipe for bean soup by @vibingranolamom with commenters saying "What if I don't like beans?"	
beige flag	A behavior or personality trait that is neither good nor bad. Derived from the relationship terms "green flag" and "red flag".	
bet	Agreeing to something; yes; okay; sure.	
bffr	Acronym for "be fucking for real".	
big back	an overweight and gluttonous person.	
big yikes	something embarrassing or cringeworthy, particularly in response to an offensive comment.	
big yahu	Nickname for Israeli Prime Minister Benjamin Netanyahu, sometimes used to portray Netanyahu as a spiritual being who assists in minor inconveniences.	
bop	(1) A derogatory term, usually for females, suggesting excessive flirtatiousness or promiscuity. (2) An exceptionally good song. (3) An acronym for "baddie on point", meaning someone who uses their appearance to make money.	(1) (2) (3)
brain rot (or brainrot)	The state of being detached from the real world as a result of consuming hyper-stimulating or chronically online content, especially when characterized by online buzzwords (e.g., "skibidi", "fanum tax", "rizz", etc). Derived from the idea that one's brain would "rot" from consuming too much stimulating, addictive or degenerate content.	
bruh/bru (/brʌ/)	A variant of "bro" originating in the 1800's, becoming more popular in 1967, again in 2003. Bruh resurged once more in the late 2010s, entering heavy use in Gen Z & Gen Alpha slang.	
buns	Something that is considered bad or low quality.	
bussin'	Extremely good, excellent. Originated from African-American vernacular for delicious food.	
bussy	Portmanteau of "boy" and "pussy" (slang for the vagina). Effectively a man's anus, especially when used in gay penetrative sex.	
blud	A variant of "blood brother", "mate" or sometimes "bro".	

== C ==
Term	Definition	References
cap	To lie originating from AAVE. The antonym, "no cap", is typically used after a statement to indicate truthfulness or being genuine.	
caught in 4K	Refers to someone being indisputably caught doing something wrong or incriminating on camera or with evidence to prove it, referencing 4K resolution.	
chopped	Physically unattractive or unfavorable.	
chud	Originally a pejorative term for someone on the far-right. Commonly used to mean a rude, unattractive, lazy, socially inept, or unintelligent person, often in self-deprecation.	
clanker	Slur for robots, primarily used against generative AI. Originated from Star Wars media.	
clapback	Swift and witty response to an insult or critique.	
code rot	a phrase to describe anything as malfunctioning.	
cook (verb)	To "cook" is to perform or do well. Often used in the phrase "let him cook".	
cooked (adjective)	To "be cooked" is to be in trouble.	
coworker music	Generic or overrated music that one's coworker might listen to. Typical examples are stomp clap music or pop rock like the Imagine Dragons. It has also been adapted to "coworker memes" and "coworker opinions" similar to "normie".	
cracked (adjective)	To be skilled at something.	
cracked (verb)	Often used in the phrases "getting cracked" or "cracking," means to have sex.	
crash out / crashout	To have a bout of rage or upset. Sometimes more generally used to refer to anger or strong displeasure. Originated in the African-American community, specifically in Louisiana with usage by rappers like NBA YoungBoy, but became popular on TikTok in 2024.	
crine	Variant pronunciation/spelling of "crying," typically meaning crying & dying from laughter (equivalent to "dying of laughter" or "I'm crying"). Often used in phrases like "son I'm crine".	

== D ==
Term	Definition	References
dead/ded	Humorous to such an extent as to "kill you". Laughter and death have been associated since Ancient Greece, where it is held that Zeuxis died from laughing at a portrait of an ugly woman he was painting.	
delusionship	A relationship in which someone holds unrealistic or overly idealistic beliefs. A person who holds such beliefs is considered "delulu".	
dih	Ironic algospeak for dick. Usually used with the wilting rose emoji for comedic effect or a symbolic eggplant emoji.	
drip	Good-looking or trendy high-class fashion.	

== E ==
Term	Definition	References
edge	To maintain a high level of sexual arousal for an extended period without reaching climax (orgasm). Often used as a dysphemism for keeping something close to completion or a goal for an undue amount of time.	

== F ==
Term	Definition	References
face card	An attractive face. Sometimes defined as never declining or receding.	
fah	An onomatopoeic internet catchphrase and viral TikTok sound effect that represents a loud, distorted, and vocalized scream of the word "fuck". It is heavily used in video editing as an audio exclamation point or impact marker to humorously signal a sudden failure, shock, or spiritual collapse. Also sometimes spelt "fahh."	
fanum tax	Theft of food between friends. Referring to the Twitch streamer Fanum who took cookies from fellow streamer Kai Cenat as a "tax" during a livestream.	
fine shyt	A slang term and phonetic variation of "fine shit", used to describe a highly attractive or desirable person. The spelling pattern follows the mainstream 2020s -h suffix mutation trend. It is frequently abbreviated online as "fs".	
finna	Term used meaning "I am going to" or "I am about to". The term has its roots in African American Vernacular English, where "fixing to" has been used to mean "getting ready to" since the 18th century. Often used interchangeably with "gonna".	
fire	Term used to describe that something is impressive, good, or pleasant.	
fit/fit check	Term used to highlight or bring attention to one's outfit or fashion. "Fit" is a truncation of "outfit".	
flop era	Primarily used on TikTok and Twitter when a person is not getting enough likes and views and starts posting memes and putting text over them in hope of going viral. Also refers to a period of time where one is experiencing diminished success or relevance	
flow state	Used to portray being 'in the flow' or intensely focusing on a task. Being fully immersed in a task that one enjoys doing.	
function	An event, party, hangout, or social gathering.	

== G ==
Term	Definition	References
gagged	Shocked, amazed, or at a loss for words.	
gas	To describe something as highly entertaining, pleasant, or good.	
geeked	Intoxicated, usually on marijuana. It is also used to describe somebody filled with excitement, highly enthusiatic, and it can also be used as a verb ("geeked out"). Mostly considered to have a positive connotation, compared to the similar but pejorative word "geek"	
ghost (verb)	To end communication or contact with someone without warning.	
glaze	To flatter, praise, or compliment someone or something so much that it becomes exasperating or excessive, coined in 2021 by Kai Cenat after reacting to a video by streamer Blueryai.	
glizzy	A hot dog. Popularized in 2020, possibly from the Washington metropolitan area, and possibly originating from the slang term "glizzy" for a Glock handgun. It may also refer to a penis.	
glow-up	A major improvement in oneself, usually an improvement in appearance, confidence, personality, and style. Frequently used in a context relating to puberty. A "glow-down" is a situation where someone's appearance has declined.	
gng	Used to refer to a close group of friends or as a casual greeting/address (e.g., "wassup gng" meaning "what's up, gang"). Can also mean "good night gang" in parting contexts, especially among gamers or online communities.	
GOAT	Acronym for "greatest of all time".	
good boy/good girl	A phrase that is mockingly used when one is told to do something and they do it. The phrase is derived from the way people praise dogs and young children for doing an instructed task.	
goofy ahh	An AAVE phrase and slang term meaning "goofy ass" used to label content as goofy or silly.	
gooning	Originally the act of masturbating or ejaculating for long periods of time, it is also used as algospeak for masturbation. The term "gooner" is also used to describe someone addicted to masturbation.	
goyslop	Refers to low quality ultra-processed foods, mass-produced products or mass media, often (but not always) in the context of being targeted towards goyim (non-Jews) to maintain complacency. Originated on 4chan as an antisemitic meme, and is seen as offensive.	
grape	An algospeak term for rape typically used online to bypass automatic filters. The use of the grape emoji (🍇) in substitution for the word "rape" is also common.	
green flag	Behaviors or personality traits that are considered positive, healthy, or desirable.	
Gucci (/ˈɡuːtʃi/)	Meaning good, cool, fashionable, or excellent. Used to express approval or satisfaction for something. Originated from the luxury brand Gucci.	
gyatt	(1) someone's buttocks, specifically attractive ones (2) Someone with large buttocks or an hourglass figure. The word comes from a stylized way of spelling "god damn" as "gyatt damn" in the context of being in awe of seeing a person's buttocks.	

== H ==
Term	Definition	References
hawk tuah	An onomatopoeia for spitting or expectoration on a penis as a form of oral sex, originally used by Haliey Welch in 2024.	
hb/hg	An initialism of homeboy/homegirl, respectively. Slang used to refer to one's friends.	
hit different	To be better in a distinctive manner. The origin of the term is unclear.	

== I ==
Term	Definition	References
ick	A sudden feeling of disgust or repulsion for something one was previously attracted to.	
icl	Abbreviation of "I can't lie". Often used alongside ts and pmo.	
IJBOL (/ˈiːdʒboʊl/)	An acronym for "I just burst out laughing".	
iPad kid	Term describing late Gen Z and Generation Alpha children who spend most of their time consuming content via a phone or tablet screen. The term was popularized in January 2021 after a 21-year-old TikToker criticized Millennial parents for allowing their children excessive screen time, saying, "I need everyone else in my generation to promise that we are not going to raise 'iPad children'. ... You've been shoving media and screens in these kids' faces since birth." He concludes: "Gen Z isn't allowed to raise iPad kids." The viral video garnered more than 525 million views on TikTok.	
it's giving	Used to describe an attitude or connotation.	
it's joever	Replacement for it's over, standing for complete physical and mental defeat. Emerged in 2024, when former U.S. President Joe Biden withdrew from the presidential election.	
iykyk	Acronym for "If you know, you know". Used to describe inside jokes and niche references.	

== K ==
Term	Definition	References
Karen	Pejorative term for an obnoxious, abrasive, or entitled (usually but not exclusively white and middle-aged) woman.	
Khia	A nobody or irrelevant person. The term is used to describe female musical artists "who people talk about, but who no one seems to care about culturally", who are said to be stuck in the "Khia Asylum", an imaginary place where pop stars are kept until they find major success. The term is derived from the name of American rapper Khia.	
Kirkifying	Use of deepfake software to put politician Charlie Kirk's face on pictures of already popular online memes. Emerged after his assassination in September 2025.	
Kirked	(1) Alternative way of saying killed, specifically by neck wound. Emerged after Charlie Kirk's assassination in September 2025. (2) to receive Kirk or getting Kirk refers to receiving a blowjob.	
KMS	Acronym for "kill myself".	
KYS	Acronym for "kill yourself". "Keep Yourself Safe" and "keys" is often used as an algospeak variant to bypass social media moderation.	

== L ==
Term	Definition	References
L	Short for "loss," used to indicate failure, defeat, or something negative. Often contrasted with "W" (meaning win).	
L+Ratio	Insult used primarily online. Combined form of the L and ratio slang terms. Became popular in 2020.	
larp	Acronym for "Live-Action Role-Playing." The term was popularized in 2026 in reference to people perceived as fake, performative, or as posers.	
lit	Remarkable, interesting, fun, or amusing.	
locked in	A state of total concentration on a task. Similar to flow state.	
lowkenuinely	A portmanteau of 'lowkey' and 'genuinely'. Used to express a mix of emotions from both words.	
lowkirkenuinely	A blend of 'lowkey', 'Kirk' (referencing political figure Charlie Kirk), and 'genuinely'. Used similarly to 'lowkenuinely' above to express a sincere feeling or opinion, but with layered internet irony.	

== M ==
Term	Definition	References
main character (MC)	Someone who is or wants to be the star of their life. Often refers to someone who strives to be the center of attention.	
mid	Average, mediocre, not bad or not special. Often used in a negative and insulting way. Sometimes used to emphasize the approachability of a conventionally attractive woman (e.g., "beautiful mid").	
moot(s)	Short for "mutuals" or "mutual followers".	
moving	An internet slang term and text-caption format – frequently structured as "how I be moving" or "moving different" – used to describe a person's behavior, tactical operations, or lifestyle choices in a given situation.	

== N ==
Term	Definition	References
nepo baby	A colloquial term short for "nepotism baby". Used to describe a celebrity, influencer, or media professional whose career success is perceived to be heavily aided by their famous or wealthy parents. While the concept of industry nepotism is old, the specific catchphrase exploded into global internet culture and media discourse in late 2022 following viral TikTok trends and a dedicated investigative cover story by New York magazine.	
nugu	Relatively unknown, obscure, or new groups that have not yet gained significant recognition or popularity among the K-pop fandom. Comes from the Korean word "누구" (nugu), which translates directly to "who?". Sometimes comes with a negative connotation in fandom culture.	
nostalgia-baiting	The practice of leveraging someone's fond memories of the past for profit.	
nothing ever happens	Originating on 4chan's /pol/ board, it is used to cynically dismiss breaking news or dramatic predictions by asserting they will not lead to meaningful or status quo-shattering consequences.	

== O ==
Term	Definition	References
oh that's not	Slang used to react to a cringe-worthy, offensive, or misguided statement, or to express immediate disapproval of a situation. The phrase originated from a viral August 2015 episode of the American talk show The View, where co-host Rosie Perez uttered the phrase to interrupt and correct a controversial remark about immigration made by guest co-host Kelly Osbourne. The phrase saw a massive resurgence as a recycled meme format and popular catchphrase on TikTok and Twitter in the 2020s.	
OK boomer	Pejorative directed toward members of the Baby Boomer generation, used to dismiss or mock attitudes typically associated with baby boomers as out of date.	
only in Ohio	Internet slang used to describe strange or surreal occurrences humorously attributed to Ohio; compare Florida man.	
oof	Used to express discomfort, surprise, dismay, or sympathy for someone else's pain. It is also the sound of a Roblox avatar when it dies or respawns. Thus the verb "to oof" can mean killing another player in a game or messing up something oneself.	
oomf	Acronym for "one of my followers" or "one of my friends". Can be turned into "oomfie" to represent affection towards another individual.	
opp	Short for opposition or enemies; describes an individual's opponents. A secondary, older definition has the term be short for "other people's pussy". Originated from street and gang culture. Dexerto claims that the primary definition stems from the secondary one, which was derived from a 1991 Naughty by Nature song titled "O.P.P.". The initialism was derived from the acronym "OPM", which was used in the neighborhood the group grew up in and stood for "other people's money". An example of the term being used in popular culture is also in the Gangsta rap scene, with YBN Nahmir and his song "Opp Stoppa". Dictionary.com implies that the origins of the two meanings had little to do with each other.	
out of pocket	In 2020s slang, "out of pocket" means "To act (or say something) crazy, wild, unexpected, or extreme, sometimes to an extent that is considered too far." This newer definition contrasts with historic meanings of "out of pocket", which can refer to someone being unreachable, personal funds, or lacking money, depending on context.	
owned	Used to refer to defeat in a video game, or domination of an opposition. Also less commonly used to describe defeat in sports. Originated in the 1990s as a term used to describe hackers gaining administrative control over another person's computer.	

== P ==
Term	Definition	References
peak	Used to describe something that is high-quality or exceptional; the best it can be.	
pick-me	Someone who seeks validation by trying to stand out, often putting down others in their gender or group to gain favor or attention. This is most commonly done by degrading oneself.	
pmo	An acronym that stands for "piss(es) me off", used to express discontent or anger at a certain topic. Often used alongside ts and icl.	
polyester	Inauthentic and low-quality. Stems from the perception of polyester clothing as cheap and artificial. The term was popularised following an edit of Spider-Man.	
pookie (/ˈpuː.kiː/)	An endearing nickname for a close friend or lover. Also used as a pet name, or in mocking sarcasm.	
pushing P	A phrase meaning acting with integrity and style while maintaining and displaying one's success. The P in the phrase is most often interpreted as standing for the slang word "player". Originated from the song "Pushin P" by the rappers Gunna, Future, and Young Thug.	

== R ==
Term	Definition	References
ratio	When a post, particularly on X (Twitter), receives more replies than retweets and likes combined. It can also be used when a reply has better reception and more likes than the original post being replied to. Originates from the mathematical term "ratio" which compares the quantitative relationship between a set of numbers.	
rage-bait	To deliberately elicit rage within an individual or group. Usually for an increase in web traffic or personal enjoyment.	
red flag	A warning sign indicating behaviors or characteristics within a relationship that may potentially be harmful or toxic. On the other hand, a green flag indicates positive aspects or healthy behaviors. The use of the term red flag as a warning dates back to the 18th century. Historically, red flags were used as signals during wars or battles to indicate danger. The term green flag comes from the use of green-colored flags indicating permission to proceed. The concept of 'beige flags' has gained popularity to represent behaviors that are neither positive nor negative, but rather depend on individual preferences or boundaries.	
rizz	One's charm/seduction skills. Derived from charisma.	
Roman Empire	A random event, person, incident, or thing that fascinates or intrigues one to the point that one is frequently thinking about it. Originated in 2023 after influencer Saskia Cort encouraged her Instagram followers to ask their male partners how often they thought about the Roman Empire, to which many answered quite often. The term spread internationally and evolved to mean something that frequently occupies one's thoughts. It has also morphed into a joke about how often people think about/mention the Roman Empire.	

== S ==
Term	Definition	References
salty	Used to describe someone who is behaving or expressing themselves in a resentful, bitter, or irritated manner. Originally referred to "racy" or "vulgar" sailors in the 1800s.	
serving cunt	To behave in a bold, confident, feminine manner.	
sheesh	To praise someone when they are doing something good. The vowels are often emphasized, as in "sheeesh". The one being praised is to do the "ice in my veins" pose popularized by basketball player D'Angelo Russell. Believed to be a variation of another word such as "jeez", "Jesus", or "shit". First used in 1955 as a word to express "disappointment, annoyance or surprise".	
shook	To be shocked, surprised, or bothered. Became prominent in hip-hop starting in the 1990s, when it began to be used as a standalone adjective for uncontrollable emotions. One famous example is Mobb Deep's 1995 single "Shook Ones, Part II".	
sigma/sigma male	A person who is individualistic, self-reliant, successful, and non-conforming to existing social norms. Used predominantly by the manosphere. Can also mean something that is good.	
simp	Sycophancy, being overly affectionate or flattering in pursuit of a sexual or romantic relationship.	
son	Used in a similar manner as bruh and bro. Originated on September 8, 2025 from a reddit post of Anthony Mackie smirking, with the caption "son😭😭😭😭😭". Variations exist such as "sonion", "folk😂" or "son im crine".	
situationship	See also: casual dating Refers to an ambiguous romantic and/or sexual relationship in which both parties have feelings for one another, but said feelings are not clearly defined: a mid-point between dating and not dating.	
six-seven (6–7)	A nonsense word derived from the song "Doot Doot (6 7)" by Skrilla. Inspired multiple numerical meme variants. Originating from TikTok.	
skibidi	Word of multiple parts of speech that derives from the web-series Skibidi Toilet with no real meaning, and often associated with brain rot.	
skill issue	Refers to a situation where a person's lack of ability or proficiency is seen as the cause of their failure or difficulty in completing a task, sometimes used ironically.	
sksksk	Used to convey happiness/laughter. A form of keysmashing. The earliest known usage is by Brazilian users on Twitter. Used by various British, African-American, and gay communities before becoming associated with stan Twitter in 2019. Became associated with VSCO girls alongside 'and I oop'. Similar forms can be found regionally, like the Indonesian "wkwkwk" or the Korean and Brazilian "kkkk".	
slaps	Used to refer to something that is perceived to be good, particularly used when referring to music.	
slay	To do something well.	
slop	Low-quality internet content, particularly that which was created by generative AI.	
snatched	Amazing, attractive, or flawlessly styled. Sometimes used to particularly describe a person as having a narrow waist.	
spiritually Israeli	A pejorative term implying something gives off the "vibe" of supporting Israel. Commonly used for things seen as culturally empty or forced.	
stan	Supporting something to an extreme degree. Specifically used in cases of overzealous or obsessive support of celebrities, originating with the eponymous song by Eminem.	
sus (/sʌs/)	Short term for suspect/suspicious. Popularized in 2018 by players of the online video game Among Us and received mainstream usage with the game's explosion in popularity in mid-2020 amidst the COVID-19 pandemic. According to Merriam-Webster, the term has been in use among English speakers since at least the 1960s.	
sussy baka	A combination of "sus" and "baka", the Japanese word for "fool". Stemmed from TikToker Akeam Francis.	
sybau	Not to be confused with Syabu. Acronym for "shut your bitch ass up".	
syfm	Acronym for "shut your fucking mouth", originally a meme taken from a scene in the movie Bronson.	

== T ==
Term	Definition	References
tea	Secret information or rumors. Originates from Black drag culture of the 1990s, where the letter "t" was used to mean "truth". "Spilling the tea" means to share gossip or rumors. Another meaning was popularized on TikTok, using 'tea' when referring to a person, action, outfit, or thing to mean it's fab, cute, iconic, etc.	
touch grass	A way of telling someone to "go outside", usually after said person is believed to have been online for too long. Believed to have originated in 2015, before experiencing a resurgence in 2020–2021.	
truth nuke	An impactful telling of factual, or sometimes opinionated, information; Sometimes spelt "trvthnvke" or shortened to "trvke".	
ts	An abbreviation for "this shit", often used as a short form of "this"; it is also used as an initialism for "type shit" (or "type shi"), a Gen Z expression used to signal total agreement, validation, or shared vibes with a statement. Often accompanied by pmo and icl.	
ts frying me	An expression that means something that is hilariously funny or extremely stressful.	
ts pmo	An abbreviation for "this shit piss(es) me off", used to express strong frustration or irritation.	
tuff	Eye dialect spelling of tough. Commonly meaning something or someone is cool or impressive, this spelling of it is mostly seen on TikTok. Likely originates from the 1967 book The Outsiders.	
tweaking	To be acting strangely or thinking that someone is hallucinating. Often used to describe the effects of drugs.	
twin	A term of endearment for a close friend, indicating a strong, sibling-like bond. Also used to imply that the user is similar to another person in a particular manner.	

== U ==
Term	Definition	References
unalive	An algospeak-based euphemism for the word "kill" or other death-related terms, often in the context of suicide. This word is often used to circumvent social media algorithms, especially YouTube and TikTok, from censoring or demonetizing content that involves death-related terms.	
unc	Abbreviation of uncle. Used mockingly or affectionately to refer to someone who is old or acting old.	
understood the assignment	To understand what was supposed to be done; to do something well. Popularized by American rapper Tay Money's 2021 song "The Assignment". She posted a video on TikTok stating that she "understood the assignment".	
uwu (/ˈuːwuː/)	Used to portray happiness or someone wanting to appear cute. Used more or less as an expression. Originated in the 2000s as an emoticon, with U's capitalized: UwU. The expression is commonly associated with e-girls, furries, femboys, and anime fandoms.	

== V ==
Term	Definition	References
vaguepost	A social media post that is intentionally cryptic or ambiguous, often for engagement farming.	
vibe check	To check one's personality, behavior, or attitude.	

== W ==
Term	Definition	References
W	Short for "win," used to indicate success, victory, or something positive. Often contrasted with "L" (loss). May also be used in the form of "dub".	
washed	To be no longer successful, popular, or skilled.	
who is this diva?	An affectionate rhetorical question used to compliment people who positively embody diva-like qualities such as boldness, style, and/or confidence. A Diva is a Roman goddess as its original meaning. Sometimes used with a purple heart emoji at the end. Originated from TikTok.	

== Y ==
Term	Definition	References
yap	To talk excessively, especially without significant meaning. Speculated to be used as early as 1592 to express annoyance and irritation. Became a TikTok trend in 2023 for someone who talks too much or whose talking does not make sense.	
yassify	To "yassify" something is to apply several beauty filters to a picture using FaceApp, an AI photo-editing application.	
you good?	Derived from AAVE, this phrase is a short hand of the usual "Are you okay?" greeting, and is generally used to express concern for an acquaintance's well-being. However, the phrase could mean different things depending on the region, and can sometimes be said negatively in response to someone doing something irrational, rude or dangerous.	

== Z ==
Term	Definition	References
zesty	Flamboyant, effeminate, or otherwise using the stereotypical mannerisms of a gay man.	
zaza, za	A drug slang for cannabis.	

== Emoji ==
Term	Definition	References
skull emoji 💀	Replacement for the phrase "I'm dying", representing laughter or when something is considered "unhinged".	
loudly crying face emoji 😭	Also a replacement for "I'm dying" or the crying with laughter emoji, representing laughter. Similar to the skull emoji.	
broken heart emoji 💔	A way to express disappointment, albeit with humorous undertones.	
wilted flower emoji 🥀	Commonly referred to as the "wilted rose emoji", it replaces, or is used in addition to, the broken heart emoji.	
aerial tramway emoji 🚡	Created and popularised in May 2025 by Youtuber John Casterline as a replacement of the loudly crying face emoji.	
