= Sisterhood (feminism) =

The concept of sisterhood in feminism stands for solidarity and mutual support between women. It has emerged from the notion of a close, intimate connection and gone through changes and criticism throughout history with the development of feminist movements and the expansion of the concept of womanhood.

== History ==
=== Sisterhood in the 18th and 19th centuries ===
During the late 18th and early 19th centuries, women formed close bonds as emotional and social support systems in the face of patriarchy. Often referred to as sororal bonding, these relationships were a way to maintain their gender identity in a society that oppressed them because of it. While these bonds were considered homosocial by some and homoerotic by others, the deep emotional connection was considered to lie in its foundation.

Carol Smith-Rosenberg, who studied female friendships of the 18th and 19th centuries, suggests that women created these relationships and support networks as a form of solidarity and resistance against the established societal norms. These relationships, which were widely accepted at the time, became marginalized by the end of the century, when the intimate undertones were sexualized and stigmatized.

=== First-wave feminism and the development of political sisterhood ===
With the rise of the women's rights movement in the 19th and early 20th centuries, the concept of sisterhood extended beyond personal relationships and friendships. Women's organizations and groups became central in the suffrage movement, labor rights, and educational reform. Recognizing the need for collective action, feminists proclaimed sisterhood as a political term. However, these movements were created by and often prioritized the concerns of white, middle-class women, leaving the experiences of marginalized groups unaddressed.

According to the American author bell hooks, political sisterhood was promoted by bourgeois feminists on the basis of common oppression, which undermined the true nature of prejudices against women. Created by white women, it was centered around white feminism and used as a means of political solidarity under the hand of patriarchy, without the consideration of intersections such as race, ethnicity, and sexuality. Hooks suggests that sisterhood, supposed to represent “unconditional love” between women, was based on racial and classist biases and thus was an illusion created to avoid confrontation and criticism.

=== Second-wave feminism and radical sisterhood ===
In 1967, Kathie Sarachild, a member of New York Radical Women, proclaimed that “Sisterhood is Powerful!”, and the phrase later became a slogan for second-wave feminism.

At this time, the notion of sisterhood expanded to consciousness-raising groups, which in turn took it beyond politics. Now, this relationship between women was meant for taking a step back from the male influence in their lives and establishing female role models instead. In some sense, the initial emotional intimacy of sisterhood was back, with the addition of material and activist support. New sisterhoods were formed, including all-Black and all-lesbian ones. However, each group was focused on their own experiences, lacking inclusivity and interconnection.

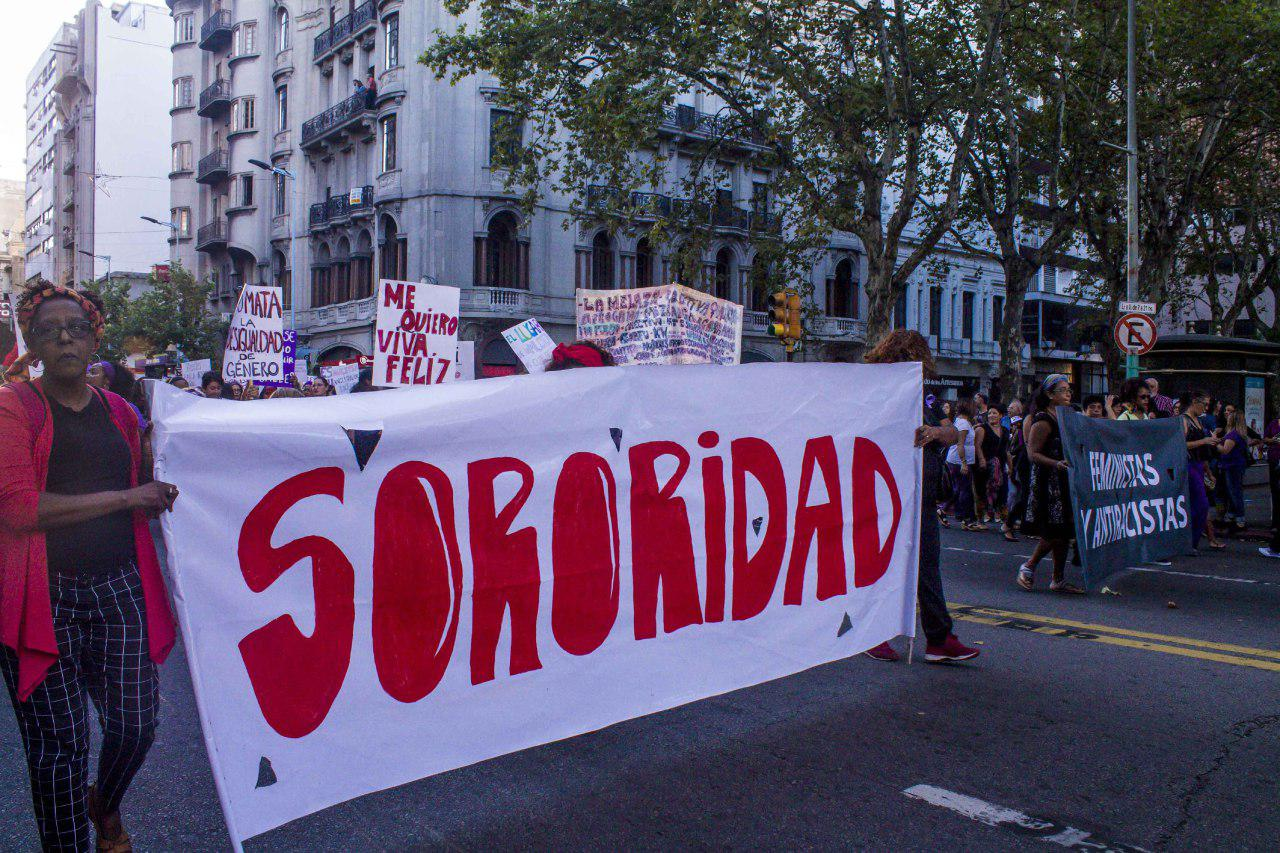

=== Third-wave feminism and intersectional sisterhood ===
The third wave of feminism came to address the shortcomings of the previous movements in an attempt to make sisterhoods more inclusive and considerate of such identity intersections as race, ethnicity, sexuality, class, etc. However, this was also the time when the term itself, being mostly associated with second-wave feminism, was subjected to skepticism for its exclusion of men and simplification of diverse female experiences. In opposition to that, trans-exclusionary radical feminists have criticized sisterhood for the attempts to include men and trans personas in the community.

=== Fourth-wave feminism and contemporary sisterhood ===
Despite the denial of fourth-wave feminism by some, with its supposed formation and the development of social media, sisterhood has regained its popularity but partially changed its definitions. Today it includes men, trans people, people of color, and other marginalized groups and is based on the diverse experiences of people rather than their common struggles and oppression.

== See also ==
- Feminist philosophy
- Fraternity
- Gynocentrism
- History of feminism
- Pickme girl
- College fraternities and sororities
