= Eepy =

== See also ==
- Glossary of Generation Z slang
