= Performative male =

2025 internet meme

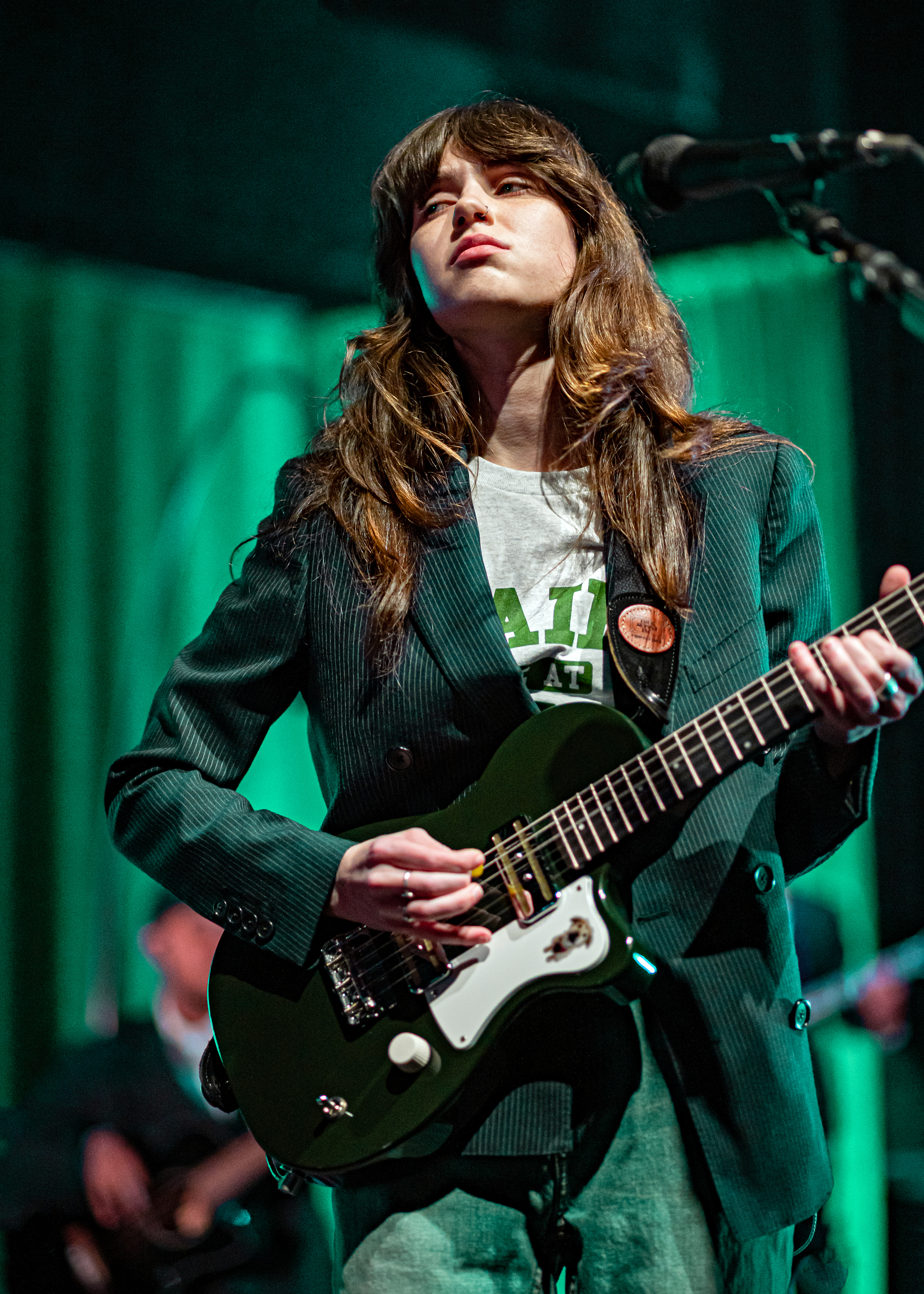
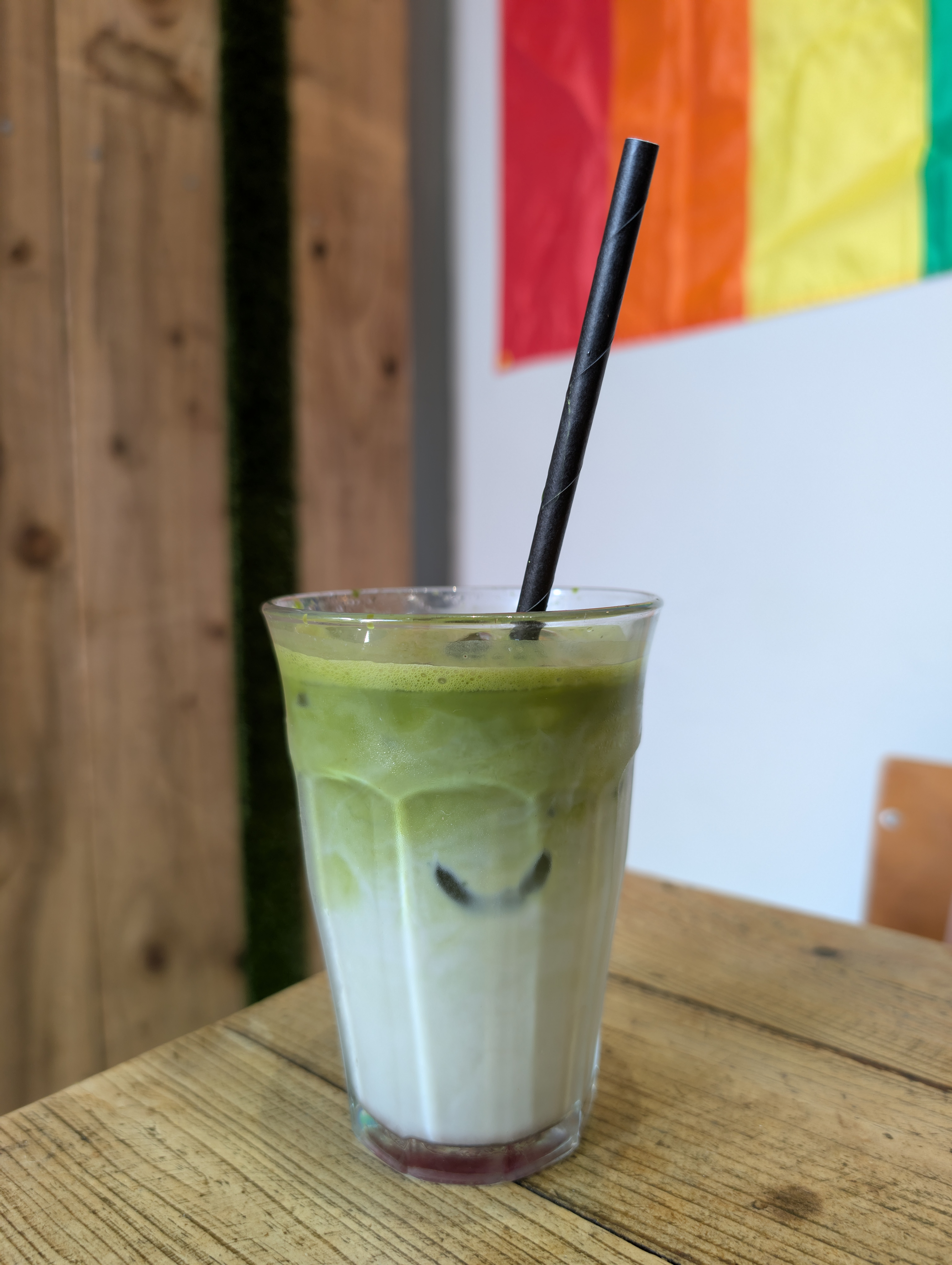
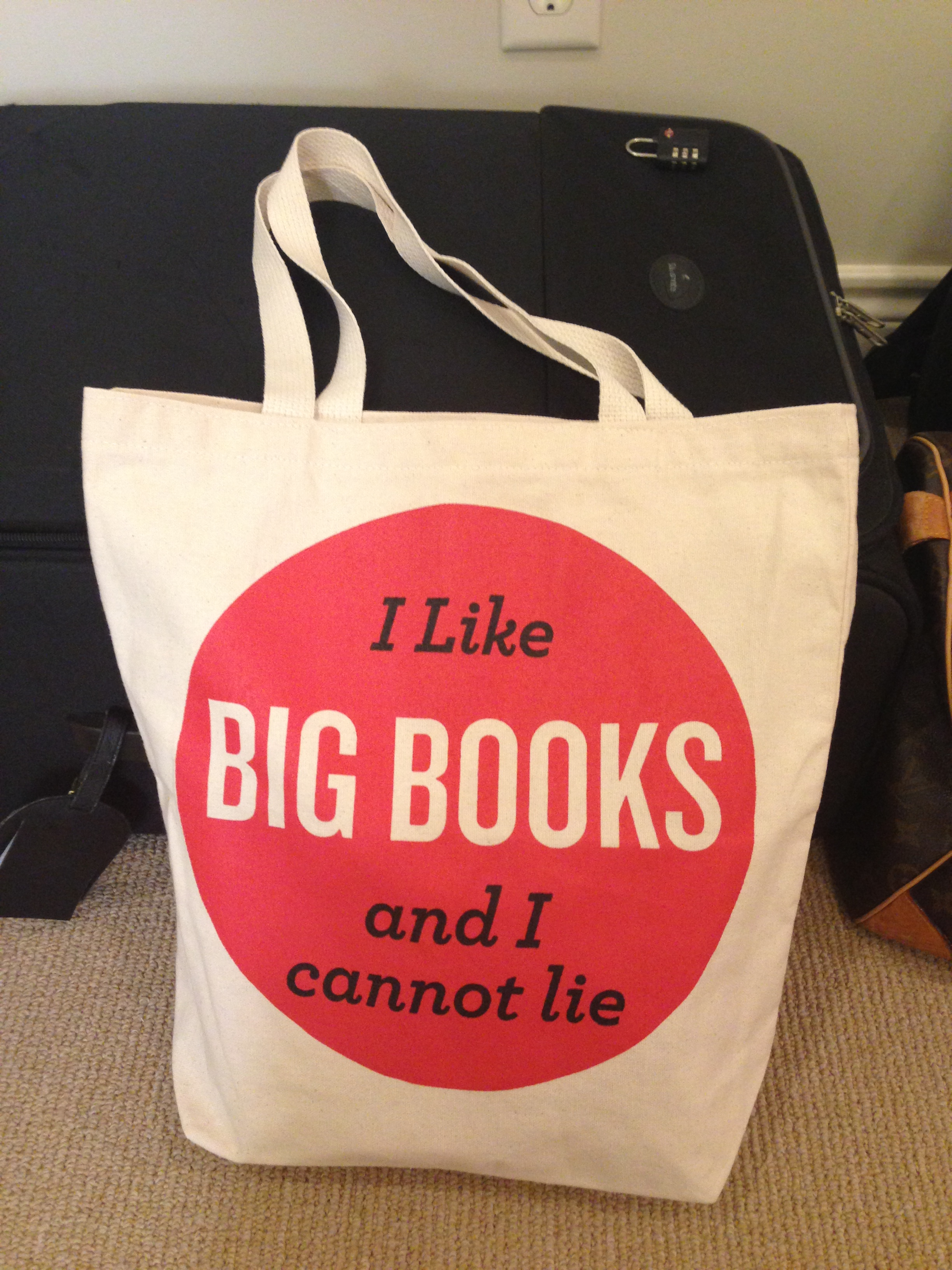
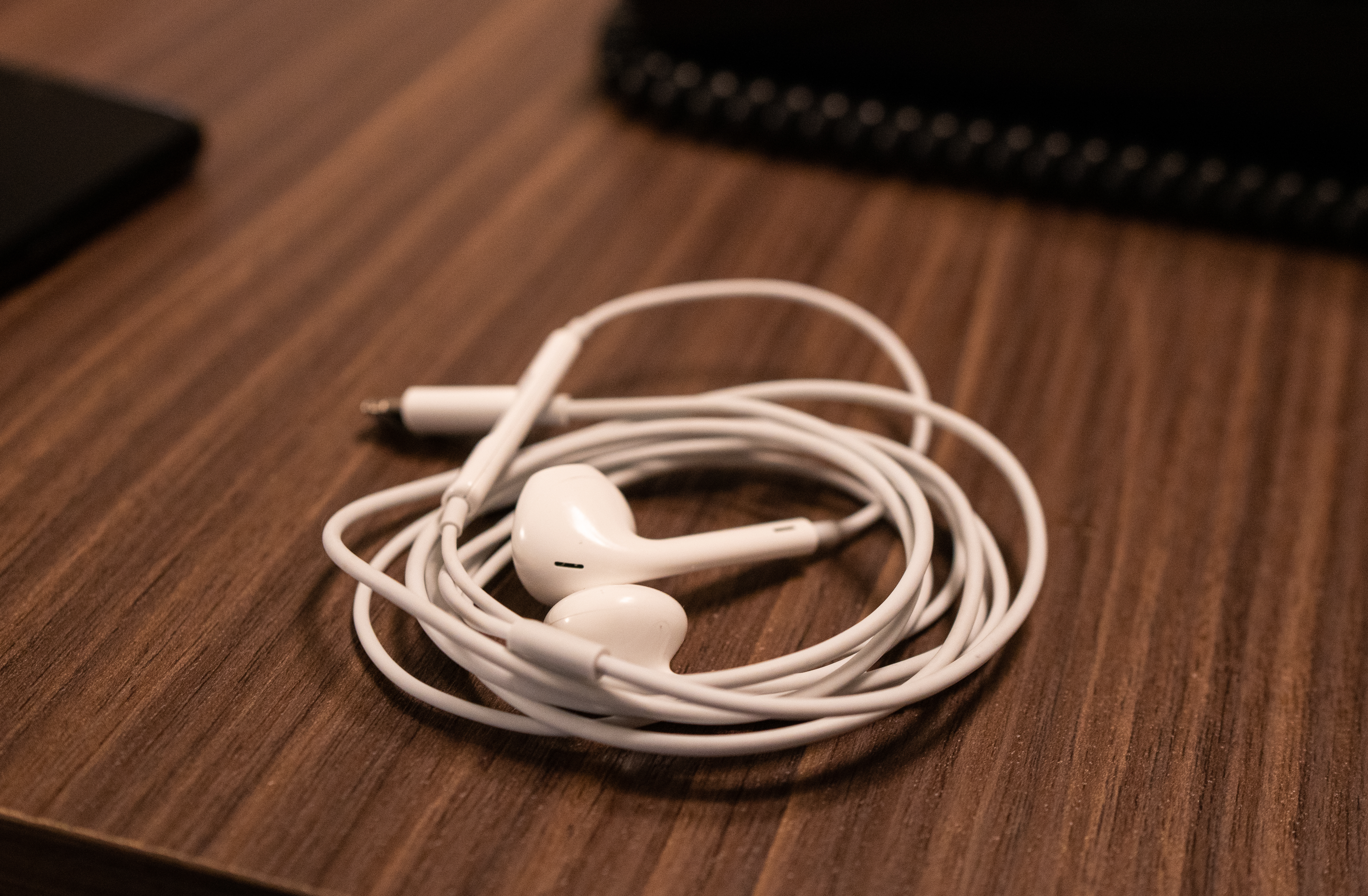
The interests of a performative male may include Clairo (top left), a matcha latte (top right), tote bags (bottom left) or wired headphones (bottom right).

The performative male (or perfomist), also sometimes called the matcha male, is an internet meme and stereotype that was popularized on social media in 2025. It refers to men who adopt a visual aesthetic that socially signals progressivism, feminism, and emotional sensitivity while otherwise not embodying those qualities. Examples of behaviors stereotyped as performative include reading books by feminist writers, listening to female indie artists such as Clairo, drinking matcha lattes, carrying a tote bag, and owning a Labubu. Performative men, as characterized by the stereotype, seek superficial romantic appeal with progressive women.

== Etymology ==
Charles Thrush, writing for Block Club Chicago, defined the performative male archetype as a man with "traditionally feminine hobbies with the sole intent of cultivating an inauthentic aesthetic that might appeal to progressive women." Mahalia Chang, writing in GQ, stated that, in his pursuit of the female gaze, the performative male, "is doing his mating dance, puffing out his feathers, in pursuit of female attention. Think of our performative male like a female gaze caricature on steroids... The performative male is designed to look alluring and non-threatening and intelligent, to and for women."

=== Characteristics ===
Characteristics of the performative male generally include astrology, iced matcha lattes, Labubu keychains, certain female musicians like Clairo or Laufey, vinyl records, vintage clothing, therapy, female authors like Sally Rooney or Joan Didion, reading feminist literature, baggy jeans, wired headphones, tote bags, and skin care, among others. In particular, Clairo's 2024 single "Juna" is often used in videos of performative males. Male celebrities who like Nico Gavino from Hypebeast suggested to be associated with the "performative male" aesthetic include Jacob Elordi, Paul Mescal, and Pedro Pascal.

Some have deemed the performative male to be both shallow in such interests and deeply manipulative in his approach to women, while others consider him to be a symptom of the overall sensibilities of performance engendered by social media at large. Genevieve Bates, in The Week, called the archetype "due in part to dating apps" in which men are expected to perform or present themselves potentially inauthentically for romantic gain.

== History ==
=== Male manipulator ===
In 2020, Pitchfork published an article on the "male manipulator meme", which they likened to the 2015 "softboy" trend, described as "sensitive and perceptive, but still a dick". The term emerged on TikTok, with discussions on Twitter prompting users to cite groups such as Radiohead, Slowdive, and the Smiths as red flags for the archetypes music taste. The concept was promptly criticized. The article further stated that the term "male manipulator music" had been used synonymously with the term "incelcore". Artists such as Gorillaz, Frank Ocean, and Mac DeMarco, along with visual media like Fight Club and BoJack Horseman have been likened to the archetype. "Female manipulator music" is an associated term consisting of acts such as Lana Del Rey and Melanie Martinez. In 2022, The Guardian stated that the Weeknd's album Dawn FM was "the Dom Pérignon of male manipulator music – a slick of negging and neediness, sleaze and sanctimony that carries the unnatural, alluring glow of toxic waste."

=== Origins ===
The specific terming of a "performative male" was popularized as an internet meme starting from 2025 as it began going viral through circulation on social media. However, think pieces about supposed performative males, cast at those who read feminist or women-written literature in public, were being written as early as August 2024 by The Times.

Cosmopolitan stated, in August 2025, that, "While this genre of man has always existed, he's recently started making the rounds online in the form of memes playfully poking fun at this kind of performative male behavior." In a similar vein, Her World called it one of many archetypes in a longstanding history of "alternative male personas," and Them called the archetype "nothing new" and akin to archetypes of previous years like the "toxic softboi" or "male manipulator," albeit with the mention that it reached a "fever pitch" in August. The Independent described it as an "arguably modern evolution of the hipster."

== In popular culture ==
=== Contests ===
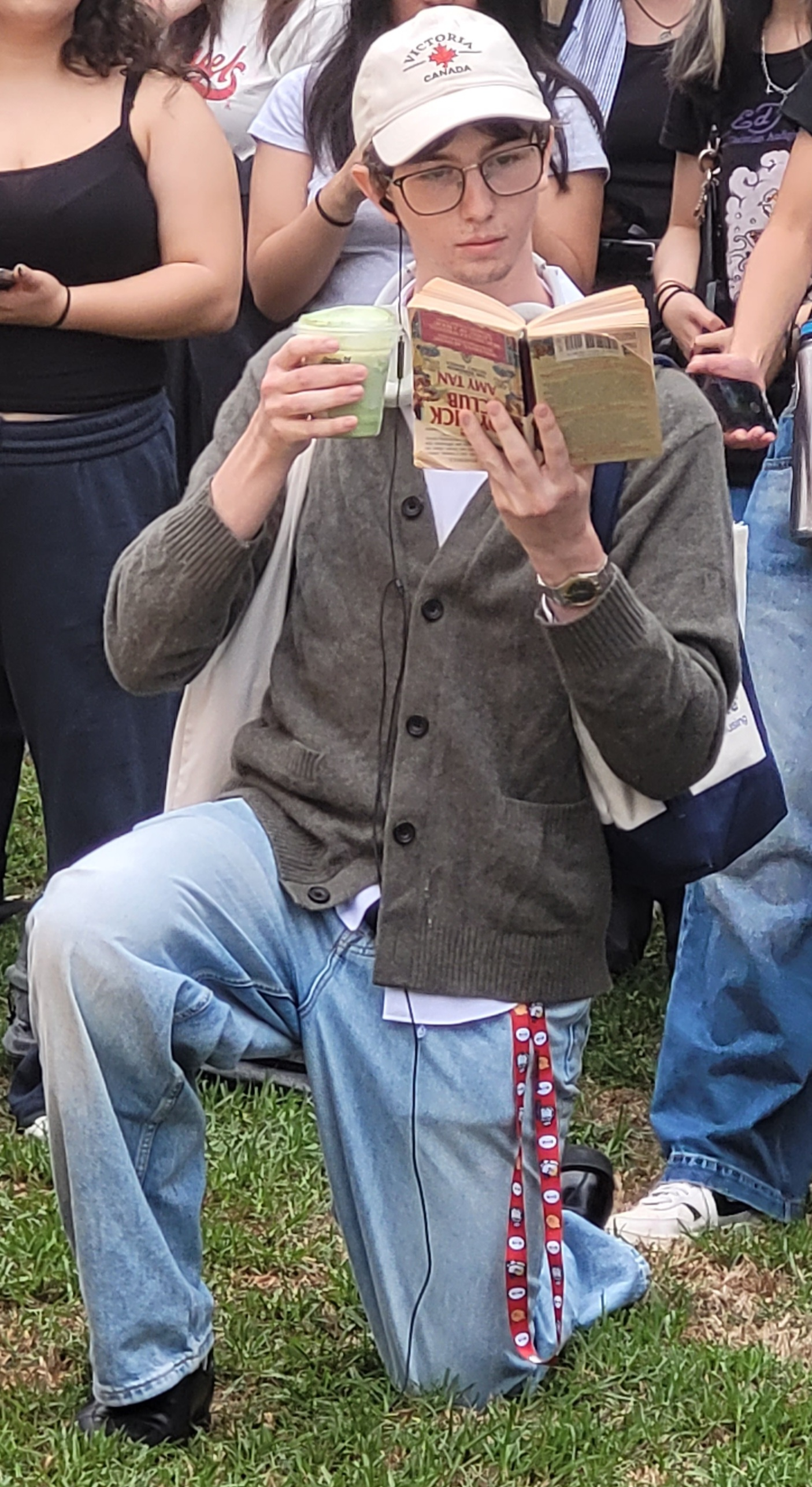
A participant in a performative male contest wearing a tote bag and holding a matcha latte

Following the tradition of 2024 look-alike contests, many performative male contests have been held in cities around the United States, for example a competition in Capitol Hill, Seattle on August 9 organized by Lanna Rain and Guinevere which involved dozens of contestants, brought in many spectators, and attracted attention online; the winner was awarded with a record player and a vinyl of Submarine by The Marías. Shortly after, Calvin Thai, a matcha pop-up co-owner in Chicago, held a similar competition in Wicker Park upon hearing about it.

Later, two similar contests were scheduled to be held in San Francisco. One of the organizers was Kake Jin, a 20-year-old who decided to host one there after seeing one happen in her home country, Canada. The contests drew hundreds of attendees and made use of artificial intelligence to rate each contestant on a scale of 0 to 100. It was sponsored by several entities, including a startup and a matcha company.

In September, performative male contests were held among the student bodies at Cornell University, the University of Florida, the University of Memphis, Baylor University, and Temple University. A contest was also held at Yale University, at the Women's Table by Cross Campus, after which administrators stated that the event violated "Yale's policy on the use of outdoor space." Some organizers called it a "made-up rule," while other students called out the administration's hypocrisy in arresting pro-Palestinian protesters on campus on those policy grounds in 2024 while not punishing the organizers of the performative male contest for the same violation.

Outside of the United States, several universities in the United Kingdom also partook in the performative male contest trend. A BSc psychology student from the University of Leeds, Mina Gjana, held a competition on January 31, 2026. As mentioned by The Leeds Tab, the event was for entertainment, but it also highlighted a local charity fighting period poverty, Freedom4Girls.

=== In media ===
On the episode of Saturday Night Live aired 13 December 2025, a sketch known as "Bachelorette Party Strippers" aired featuring Ben Marshall and guest host Josh O'Connor as two strippers at a hen party who embody the soft boy aesthetic and could be seen as performative males.

== Criticism ==
Some have criticized the discourse about performative males, with some men online stating that their feminine-leaning interests do not exist for female validation, nor to appease the trend cycle, but due to inherent, genuine interest.

Additionally, James Factora, in an article for Them, criticized the ongoing discourse in its implication and validation of a "non-performative male" which may be worse: "Intentionally or not, these memes only reinforce the idea that the manosphere's version of manhood is the default state of masculinity, and that any variations are an aberration, or worse, a farce." Similarly, Noni Reginato of Cosmopolitan Australia wrote that an allegedly performative male was still a much better alternative to the men who are "increasingly being co-opted into the right-wing agenda by the likes of Andrew Tate"; it also celebrated men earnestly pursuing supposedly progressive or feminine interests. University of California, Los Angeles professor Dr. Juliet Williams told The Independent that the meme's pile-on effect against men could run the risk of alienating those with "earnest attempts to connect with the opposite sex" and/or "answer the feminist call."

Syeda Khaula Saad, writing in The Huffington Post, stated that the popularity of the "performative male" was reinforcing gender roles, othering men from alternative masculinities, and shutting down what could be "an act of resistance against toxic masculinity." Likewise, The Daily Tar Heel argued to leave the alleged "performative male" alone and that the meme "sets us back years, as it encourages men to embrace a conformity driven by stereotypes of emotional immaturity and oblivion" rather than simply embracing one's femininity as authentically as possible.

Alexander Stoffel argued in The Conversation that discussions about the "performative male" should be less about men themselves and more about "how shallow social media is" in general, while also pointing out that the meme was rooted in a cynicism that leads to a "toxic public environment." Rachel Connolly, writing for The Guardian, argued that critiques of "performative righteousness" should be applied not only to young, straight men but also "women who take care to post highlighted and pencilled-over pages of bell hooks to Instagram" but do not participate in any activism. Connolly also criticized the term as a whole as "pop psychology" after having received "a few PR emails" in which "experts" attempted to seriously identify traits, or "red flags," to be wary of in alleged performative males.

== See also ==
- Spiritually Israeli – Internet slang term used as a pejorative
- Performative activism – Insincere or self-serving activism
- Simp – Slang for sycophancy
- Identity politics – Politics based on one's identity
- Sigma male – Slang terms for men
- E-boy – Youth subculture
- Internet aesthetic – Visual styles and subcultures associated with the internet
- Pickme girl – Internet meme and youth slang
