= Literary chic =

Fashion trend

Literary chic, also known as bookworm chic or poetcore, is a fashion trend combining high fashion with bookish aesthetics and references to literature. Generally described as "preppy looks built around functional staples" with books as accessories or decorations, it gained traction in late 2025 and early 2026.

== Definition ==
Vogue defined literary chic as a fashion trend with preppy clothing, literary references, and "intellectual flair." Bustle argued that it was a "twin sister" of poetcore and a revival of dark academia, and Lifestyle Asia stated that "On the Spring/Summer 2026" runways...brands like Celine, Tory Burch, Wales Bonner, and Miu Miu are advocating for us to dress either like a hot librarian or very stylish English major."

== History ==
Starting in 2025, numerous high fashion houses leaned into literature. In the Fall 2026 fashion season, several celebrities like Elle Fanning decorated their purses with book bag charms in the shape of mini readable books. In the Spring 2026 fashion season, Dior released the Book Tote, a line of luxury tote bags adorned with literary references to books such as Madame Bovary by Gustave Flaubert and Le Fleurs du Mal by Charles Baudelaire. In particular, the Celine Spring 2026 show was rife with literary homages, such as a Fiona Apple soundtrack and writers Ottessa Moshfegh and Miranda July sitting in the front row. Miu Miu also launched the Miu Miu Literary Club which opened pop-ups around the world to provide free books such as Jane Austen's Persuasion and host literary symposiums at events like Milan Design Week.

Vogue, Bustle, and other publications argued that celebrities, in addition to high fashion houses, have also leaned into literature given the rise of celebrity sightings with books, the formation of celebrity book clubs, and the production of modern Hollywood book-to-screen adaptations like Wuthering Heights which "have put the classics back in vogue."

== Critical reception ==
Elle attributed the fashion trend to the exotification of "the idea of writing and writing...in our very distracted age" and called it a worsening of the performative male phenomenon, stating that "Perhaps we can blame Emerald Fennel’s upcoming adaptation of Wuthering Heights for reminding everyone of the power of a literary sex scene and a balloon sleeve."

Francesca Granata, a fashion studies professor at Parsons School of Design, had a more optimistic view, arguing that high fashion houses were tapping into a societal desire "for slower and more considerate rhythms in the midst of the frenetic pace of fashion and life more generally."
