= Normalization of antisemitism =

The normalization of antisemitism is the shift of anti-Jewish hate from fringe to mainstream. Various scholars have examined the persistence and evolving manifestations of the normalization of antisemitism.

== Academic usage ==
In "Normalization of antisemitism, 1880–1900: the case of a Jesuit community in Rome", David Dahl analyzed the dynamics within La Civiltà Cattolica that led to its gradual acceptance of antisemitism in the late 19th century.

In "The 'Jewish Question', Hungarian sociology and the normalisation of antisemitism", Kati Voros described the transformation of antisemitic rhetoric into “what was seen as legitimate social analysis and political critique” within sociological theory in Hungary between 1900 and 1920.

In Alternative für Deutschland: The AfD: Germany's New Nazis or another Populist Party? (Liverpool University Press, 2020), Thomas Klikauer argued that both the Alternative for Germany (AfD) and the Freedom Party of Austria (FPÖ) contributed to the normalisation of antisemitism and the mainstreaming of fascism.

In 2019, Miriam Elman and Asaf Romirowsky attributed "a significant growth in the normalization of antisemitism" to the impact of the Boycott, Divestment and Sanctions (BDS) movement.

In 2024, Lili Levi called the deployment of antisemitism as a political tool a sign of the normalization of antisemitism in the US, noting that Democrats and Republicans accuse each other of complicity in antisemitism. Erica Cervini noted that the normalization of antisemitism had led to increasing attacks on Jewish individuals and businesses, and to students feeling unsafe on university campuses in Australia.

== European Union and United Kingdom ==
In 2017, the European Jewish Congress described "a distinct normalisation of antisemitism, racism and xenophobia" in Poland following a University of Warsaw study of attitudes toward antisemitic hate speech.

In 2018, the EU Agency for Fundamental Rights conducted its second survey on antisemitism in the European Union, finding that 79% of respondents had not reported even the most serious incident of antisemitism that they had experienced since 2013 to the police. The report states that perpetrators span the breadth of political and class spectrums, which shows how normalized antisemitism is in European society.

In 2025, the right-wing pro-Israel advocacy group StandWithUs presented its campus antisemitism report to the House of Lords. Conservative member of the House of Lords, Howard Leigh, said the report confirmed the terrible state that the UK is in.

== Antisemitism: 1919-1939 exhibit ==
A 2016 New York Historical Society exhibit, Antisemitism: 1919-1939, addressed how anti-Jewish hatred "can permeate a national discourse and become ‘normal’ for ordinary people”. In addition to newspaper clippings, excerpts from Hitler's speeches, a printing of the Nuremberg laws, and park bench signs forbidding Jews, the exhibit focused on children's toys and books which desensitized German children toward antisemitic tropes from an early age.

== PBS Metrofocus documentary ==
In 2022, PBS featured an episode called "The Normalization of Antisemitism" as part of its Exploring Hate initiative produced by Metrofocus. Interviewees included Atlantic reporter Yair Rosenberg, historian Pamela Nadell, and Race Forward executive VP Eric K. Ward. Host Jenna Flanagan introduced the topic with the assertion by "Jewish leaders and allies" that "celebrities, politicians, and media personalities" were increasingly welcoming antisemites onto their platforms and amplifying antisemitic rhetoric. Flanagan called Ye's praise of Hitler, Donald Trump's dinner with Nick Fuentes, Kyrie Irving's promotion of a film denying the Holocaust, and Dave Chapelle's elevation of antisemitic tropes on SNL "the tip of the iceberg". Ward commented that antisemitism "is not a form of religious bigotry. It’s a form of racialized bigotry."

== US National Strategy pillar ==
The May 2023 US Biden-Harris National Strategy to Counter Antisemitism, a 60-page document issued by the White House, called its third pillar "Reverse the Normalization of Antisemitism and Counter Antisemitic Discrimination: Whole-of-Society Calls to Action". Strategic goal 3.1 called for "meaningful accountability for antisemitic conduct" in order to "roll back the normalization of antisemitism". The American Bar Association endorsed those goals in a 2024 statement.

In December 2023, following the October 7 attacks, Representatives Jerrold Nadler, Daniel Goldman, and Jamie Raskin introduced a resolution calling for implementation of the National Strategy. Commenting on the resolution, Congressman Goldman decried "the normalization of antisemitism on our college campuses, on social media, and in our communities". NCJW CEO Sheila Katz told US officials including Secretary of Education Cardona that she was witnessing a 'normalization of antisemitism', and they agreed with data showing that antisemitic incidents had reached unprecedented levels, as in Canada and other countries.

== Responses from Jews ==
In 2022, Israeli political activist Hen Mazzig decried the paucity of knowledge about the Holocaust among younger Americans. Mazzig called for more deterrence of antisemitic crimes, calling them “a ‘canary in the coal mine’ indicating that tolerance and democracy itself are in severe distress”.

Raheli Baratz of the World Zionist Organization authored a report on behalf of the WZO and the Jewish Agency for Israel showing that global antisemitic incidents were 340% higher in 2024 than in 2022. The report detailed the increasing use of the term "Zionism" and its derivatives as a euphemism in antisemitic expressions. Baratz commented, "This is not a coincidence — it is a deliberate change in language aimed at making antisemitism socially acceptable".

Jonathan Greenblatt wrote that the ADL's surveys noted an increase in the percentage of Americans who harbored "extensive antisemitic views" from 9% in 2014, to 20% in 2022, to 24% in 2024, adding "antisemitism can no longer be considered a fringe belief". The ADL explained that the increase was due partly to their new methodology, which was disputed by some current and former staff disagreeing with the ADL's methodology, e.g. definition of antisemitism being used.

In 2025, Deborah Lipstadt, the US Special Envoy to Monitor and Combat Antisemitism, said in Brussels: "We are at an inflection point. Antisemitism is becoming increasingly normalized...[antisemitic comments] are freely heard on streets of some of our leading Western democracies in many countries, including this country." David Hirsh claimed that in British politics, antisemitism was considered "outside of the boundaries of democratic discourse" from World War II until Jeremy Corbyn's leadership of the Labour Party.

== Responses ==
In 2019, the World Council of Churches and the International Jewish Committee for Interreligious Consultations met in Paris for a conference on “The Normalisation of hatred: Challenges for Jews and Christians today”. The Reverend Peter Prove described “a new normalization of hatred, in which antisemitism, among many other old prejudices and discriminatory attitudes, is demonstrably on the rise today”.

In a 2022 commentary for WGBH called "Why the normalization of antisemitism is not just a crisis for Jews", Reverend Irene Monroe cited the 2017 "Unite the Right" rally and the Colleyville synagogue hostage crisis as examples of rising antisemitism in the United States.

In 2022, Northwestern University history professor Peter Hayes said he was "very concerned" about the normalization of antisemitism, noting the increased "public discussion of things that used to be beneath contempt".

In 2024, New York City Mayor Eric Adams said that hatred was increasing toward various minority groups, adding "What troubles me the most is that we have normalized antisemitism". He called out "our major media" for minimizing occurrences of antisemitism at college campus protests. Congressman Ritchie Torres called out a video game maker for "normalizing the most monstrous forms of antisemitic violence and terror—like beheadings, suicide bombings, and the war crimes of October 7th". Senator John Fetterman noted that "It's crazy now that [Zionism] becomes a slur in certain circles," adding that "it's been turned into like, 'you Zionist,' or whatever, it's crazy."

In 2025, when Joe Rogan hosted proponents of antisemitic conspiracy theories on his podcast, academics and political commentators categorized this as a normalization or mainstreaming of antisemitism. Susan Benesch, founder of the Dangerous Speech Project, noted that antisemites "mix criticism of Israel and antisemitism". Aaron Pomerantz wrote that normalizing extremism under the guise of "just asking questions" preceded podcasting, arguing the approach was used by George Lincoln Rockwell, founder of the American Nazi Party. Ye's 2025 antisemitic song was noted to "normalize Nazi language".

Critics contend that changes in the definition of antisemitism, particularly the inclusion of some criticism of Israel, account for part of the increase and normalization of antisemitism supported by surveys.

== See also ==
- Anti-Semitism in the 21st Century: The Resurgence
- Antisemitism during the Gaza war
- Attitude polarization
- Creeping normality
- Delegitimisation
- New antisemitism
- Normalization (sociology)
- Spiritually Israeli
- Timeline of antisemitism in the 21st century
