= Goyslop =

Antisemitic internet slang term

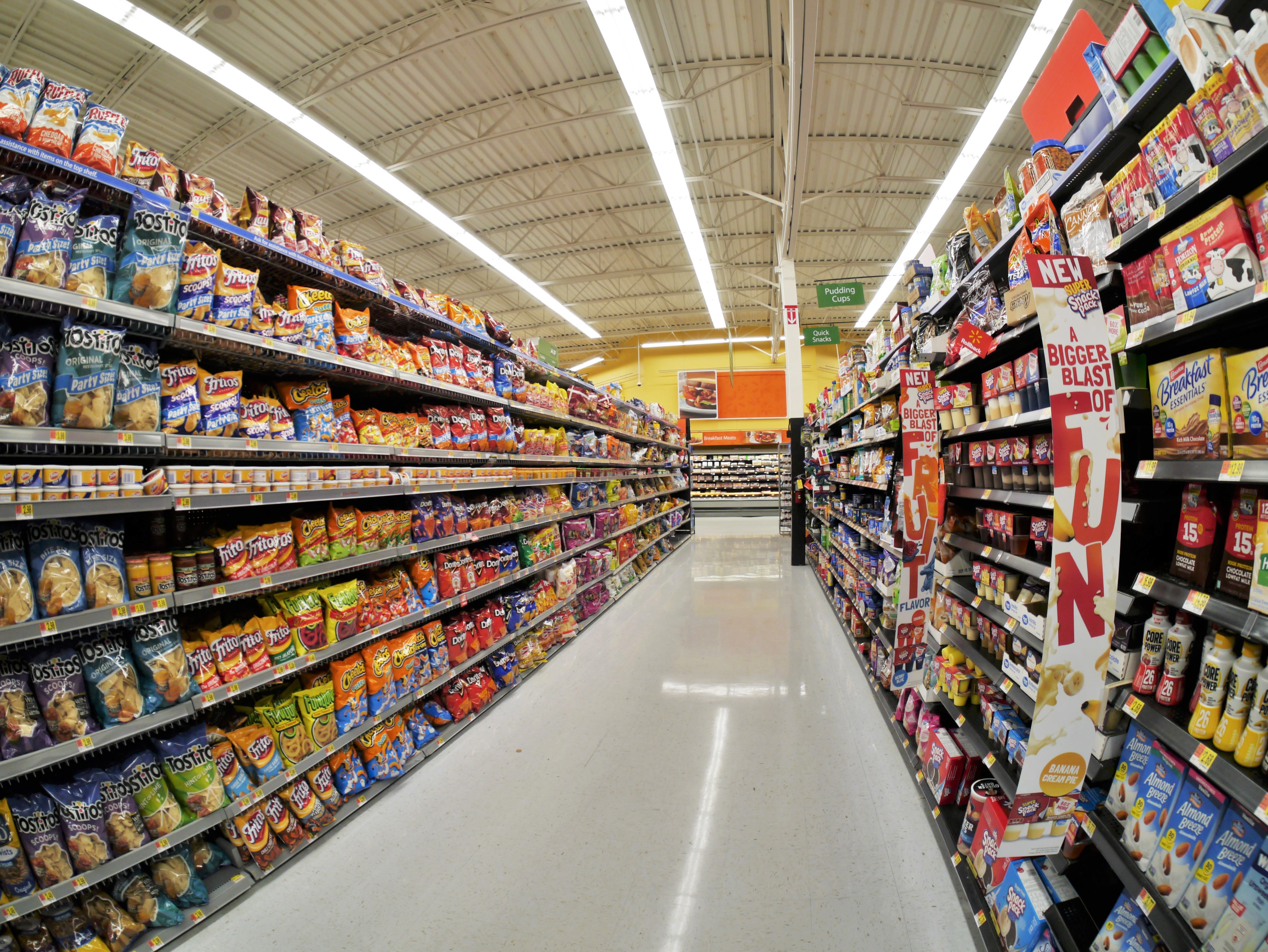
Various items at a Walmart in the United States; the items being sold are commonly described by the term.

Goyslop is an antisemitic internet slang term used to describe ultra-processed food, fast food, and other mass-produced consumer products. Conspiracy theorists use it to frame such products as tools used by Jewish elites to keep non-Jews unhealthy and compliant.

The term is a compound word joining goy, a Hebrew and Yiddish word for a non-Jew or gentile, and slop, meaning food waste or refuse of low quality. Commentators have described it as an offshoot of an older antisemitic canard holding that Jews promote inferior goods to weaken non-Jewish populations. The New York Times described the term as built on the premise that Jewish elites purposefully feed the masses "cheap, enfeebling swill", a claim expressed online through references to "goycattle" being herded to their troughs.

Goyslop first drew mainstream notice in late 2024, amid American debate over ultra-processed food, and again in early 2026 after Republican candidate for Florida governor, James Fishback, used it publicly at campaign events.

== Origin and spread ==
The term's first known use was on 4chan in 2016, when a poster described In-N-Out Burger as "greasy goyslop food". By 2019, the term was being used on 4chan with conspiratorial framing, with one poster asking how a "functional society" could result from feeding children "GOYSLOP".

The term gained visibility through the white supremacist internet personality Nick Fuentes and his fanbase, known as "Groypers", who helped carry far-right internet vocabulary into more mainstream online spaces. Phillip Hamilton, an editor at Know Your Meme, said the term's spread accelerated after 2022 due to relaxed content moderation on X. The term has gained particular popularity in online far-right spaces, becoming a recurring term across platforms including Reddit, X, and Instagram.

Writing in The Boston Globe, columnist Mattia Ferraresi placed the coinage within a longer European tradition of accusing Jews of poisoning water wells and food supplies, a charge most infamously levelled during the Black Death pogroms of the 14th century, and described goyslop as repackaging that older accusation as "health-conscious populism". (Note: The writer did not define this term but in short, he described how goyslop recasts the older accusation using the language of contemporary health-populist politics, which frames food and public-health institutions as sites of the Ruling Class betrayal of ordinary Americans; in the antisemitic variant of that rhetoric, "Jewish elites" replace corporations or government agencies as the source of harm)

=== Mainstream and youth usage ===
By 2026, The New York Times reported that use of goyslop had spread well beyond far-right online communities into ordinary teenage slang, including among Jewish students, often stripped of its original antisemitic intent. One New Jersey high schooler interviewed by the paper estimated that most students at his school were familiar with the term, and said that although he understood its origins in antisemitic conspiracy theory, his peers used it simply to criticize corporations rather than Jews. The New York Times compared this trajectory to other instances of fringe internet jargon "breaking containment" into mainstream youth speech, largely shorn of its original political meaning, while cautioning that such normalization can also allow extremist ideas to enter the mainstream through "glib, uninterrogated jokes". The Anti-Defamation League (ADL) criticized the New York Times column, saying that teenage adoption did not change the term's origin as an antisemitic slur rooted in white supremacist conspiracy theories.

Writing in The Free Press the same month, high school student Leo Lewis described goyslop as a defining term of a broader resurgence of antisemitism among young American men, arguing that the word had spread through memes and short-form video to users who were often unaware of its origin.

== Usage ==
Goyslop is used primarily to refer to fast food and ultra-processed snacks, including sodas, chips, and chain restaurant meals. Jewish-American newspaper The Forward distinguishes its conspiratorial framing from ordinary criticism of ultra-processed food or corporate food practices, noting that while "large corporations profit off of making cheap, low-nutrition food", there is "no larger conspiracy or nefarious aim beyond, well, profiting off of cheap burgers". The term has extended beyond food to include entertainment, including films and television.

The term was also the name of a short-lived video game. In June 2026, an independent developer published Goyslop on Steam, billing it as a "Nazi Souls-like" title built around antisemitic conspiracy theories. Jewish Redditors on the subreddit r/Jewish flagged the game to Steam shortly before release, and after initial complaints went nowhere, one user escalated the matter to Jewish U.S. representative Kim Schrier, whose district includes the parent company of Steam, Valve Corporation. After complaint, the game was removed within a day, four days after it went on sale.

Commentators have distinguished goyslop from the broader internet usage of slop to describe low-quality, mass-produced content generally. Hamilton said ordinary "slop" describes anything "slapped together just to offer the bare minimum level of entertainment," whereas goyslop carries the added implication that the material is "produced by Jewish people for non-Jewish people to indoctrinate, harm or brainwash them." A related term, ZOGslop (or ZOGchow), referencing the Zionist Occupation Government conspiracy theory, has circulated since at least 2017 and is sometimes used to mock Donald Trump's fondness for McDonald's by casting him as gluttonous and beholden to Jewish or Zionist interests.

=== Kosher-symbol conspiracy theories ===
In September 2026, The Forward reported that (some) antisemites had produced another related claim online: that hechshers – the kosher-certification marks on packaged food – secretly identify products that are healthier because Jews eat them. Journalist Mira Fox linked the claim's visibility to a viral AI-generated advertisement for a dietary supplement in which a Jewish family's health is attributed to a hidden product rather than diet, and reported that some health influencers had begun directing their followers to look for Kosher certified food while grocery shopping as a marker of safer food. The central premise of this claim is connected to a Russian folk legend, traced by Tablet writer Yair Rosenberg to a 1967 lecture on Slavic folklore, in which Jews were said to possess a secret "hairy vegetable" that let them drink alcohol without becoming intoxicated, an advantage they were said to withhold from others.

== In politics ==
The word gained broader public attention in late 2024 after a viral photograph showed Robert F. Kennedy Jr. (Note: Kennedy was nominated as United States Secretary of Health and Human Services following the 2024 presidential election.) eating a McDonald's meal alongside President Donald Trump and other political figures, despite Kennedy's public stance as a critic of ultra-processed food. Commentators in far-right online spaces used the image to debate whether goyslop or ZOGslop best described a McDonald's meal.

In February 2026, James Fishback, a candidate for the Republican nomination in the 2026 Florida gubernatorial election, used goyslop at a campaign event at the University of Central Florida while criticizing school cafeteria food, saying: "But if you wanted kids to fail, if you wanted to set our kids up for failure, you would feed them the absolute goyslop in our cafeterias." The JTA and The Times of Israel both reported that the ADL criticized the usage and identified the term as rooted in antisemitic internet culture. Asked by Moment why he used the term, Fishback said: "Because it's funny. Get a life." Fishback used the term again at a University of Florida event in March 2026.

Mark Pitcavage, a senior research fellow with the Anti-Defamation League's Center on Extremism, said the joking framing of terms such as goyslop makes antisemitic ideas more likely to spread, and compared unwitting use of the term to other words and phrases with antisemitic origins that have entered casual speech.

== Coverage ==
Chart showing mentions of "goyslop" every month by platform (March 2021–26)

Academic work on antisemitic online language has referenced the term directly. A 2024 IEEE conference paper on antisemitic terminology detection included goyslop among seed terms used to identify antisemitic language in far-right social media.

In August 2026, the Institute for Strategic Dialogue (ISD) published a report using goyslop as a central case study in what its author, Peter Benzoni, termed "lexical laundering", which is the process by which fringe vocabulary migrates from extremist forums into mainstream discourse while still keeping its original meaning for an in-group audience. Drawing on about 305,000 posts collected from more than 15 platforms, including 4chan, Twitter, Reddit and YouTube, the report traced the term's spread from 4chan's "Politically Incorrect" board into health and wellness communities, noting that one creator had used it across 37 videos in six months, including a single post that drew 205,000 engagements. ISD also reported on goyslop alongside case studies of other terms including gorillion (originally a slang term referring to any impossibly high number, but co-opted by Holocaust deniers to cast doubt on the documented figure of six million Jewish deaths as being impossibly high). ISD found the term gorillion had surged in use on X beginning in late 2023. ISD also found that use of the term had broadened beyond food to describe media and entertainment generally, and recommendeded that platforms track how such vocabulary migrates between communities rather than relying on static blocklists. The report was covered by The Jewish Star and other Jewish news outlets.

== See also ==
- Antisemitic canard
- Kosher tax conspiracy theory
- Mystery meat
- Online antisemitism
- Spiritually Israeli
- AI slop
