= Performative activism =

Insincere or self-serving activism

Performative activism or performative allyship is an often pejorative term used to criticize actions on social media meant to demonstrate support for social justice movements perceived as inauthentic. Examples include using a rainbow filter to indicate support for LGBTQ+ movements or posting a black square on social media to show support for Black Lives Matter. The term performative activism implies that such actions are intended to gain respect and popularity rather than challenge inequality, and that they have either no effect or harmful effects on progress towards social equality.

== History and usage ==
=== Early uses of the term ===
The term appeared online in a 2015 article by Hyperallergic, but referred to the activism that involved an element of performance art. The article referenced the Greenham Common Women's Peace Camp, and how some women protested nuclear weapons by decorating a fence "with pictures, banners, and other objects," and added that "they blocked the road to the site with dance performances. They even climbed over the fence to dance in the forbidden zone."

In September 2018, Lou Constant-Desportes, the editor-in-chief of AFROPUNK.com resigned, citing "performative 'activism' dipped in consumerism and 'woke' keywords used for marketing purpose."

=== Rainbow washing ===
Rainbow washing refers to the practice of corporations or organizations publicly aligning themselves with LGBTQ+ rights through symbolic gestures—such as adopting rainbow-themed logos, merchandise, or marketing campaigns during Pride Month—while failing to substantively support LGBTQ+ communities or address systemic inequities. The term, a portmanteau of "rainbow" (a symbol of LGBTQ+ pride) and "whitewashing," gained prominence in the 2010s as critics accused companies of exploiting queer identities for profit or reputational gain.

=== George Floyd protests and Black Lives Matter ===
On June 1, 2020, while expressing support for the Black Lives Matter movement in the wake of the George Floyd protests, singer Lorde stated, "One of the things I find most frustrating about social media is performative activism, predominantly by white celebrities (like me). It's hard to strike a balance between self-serving social media displays and true action."

On June 2, about 28 million Instagram users participated in the "Blackout Tuesday" movement, which involved users posting a completely blacked-out square image in order to show support of the George Floyd protests. Celebrities and general users alike received criticism by other social media users for engaging in "performative activism" via these Blackout Tuesday posts.

On June 5, Washington, D.C., mayor Muriel Bowser had the phrase Black Lives Matter painted on 16th Street in front of the White House. Bowser was criticized as an example of a government official creating a "performative distraction".

=== Diversity and inclusion efforts at companies ===
By 2024, DEI initiatives faced significant backlash and decline. A combination of political polarization, legal challenges to affirmative action (e.g., the U.S. Supreme Court's 2023 Students for Fair Admissions v. Harvard decision), and economic pressures led many companies to scale back or eliminate DEI programs. In October 2024, major corporations such as Meta, Boeing, Target, Amazon, Ford, Harley-Davidson, Lowe’s, Walmart among many others disbanded DEI departments or reduced related spending, citing shifting priorities and financial constraints. Critics of DEI framed these cuts as a rejection of "woke capitalism," while advocates argued it reflected performative retreats under political pressure rather than genuine commitment to equity.

Analysts noted that the decline coincided with heightened partisan rhetoric around corporate social responsibility and "culture war" debates. Some companies rebranded DEI efforts under less politically charged terms like "talent optimization" or "workplace belonging." The trend also followed lawsuits alleging reverse discrimination and shareholder demands for cost-cutting amid economic downturns. Critics of the cuts, including civil rights groups, warned that abandoning DEI risked exacerbating workplace inequities, particularly for marginalized groups.

The Forbes report documenting these rollbacks highlighted the tension between performative activism and sustained organizational change, noting that many companies had previously promoted DEI pledges during periods of social unrest but deprioritized them once public attention faded.

=== Other instances ===
In May 2025, Chris Bishop, a senior Minister in the National Government of New Zealand, heckled the performance of Stan Walker, a winner of two Māori artist awards at the 2025 Aotearoa Music Awards, as "performative acclaim".

== See also ==
- Imperial feminism – Use of feminism to justify imperialism
- Online shaming – Form of public shaming
- Performative male – 2025 internet meme
- Performativity – Linguistic quality
- Slacktivism – Pejorative term for "feel-good" activist measures
- Thoughts and prayers – English-language phrase used when offering condolences
- Virtue signalling – Pejorative term
- Tokenism – Making a perfunctory or symbolic effort towards including minority groups
