= Eric K. Ward =

American civil rights organizer

Eric K. Ward is an American civil rights organizer who focuses on responding to white nationalism, antisemitism, anti-LGBTQ violence, and structural inequality.

== Early life and education ==
Ward grew up in Los Angeles and Long Beach, California. At the University of Oregon, he was co-director of the Black Student Union.

== Career ==
After college, Ward researched white supremacists at the Western States Center and the Northwest Coalition Against Malicious Harassment. He spent several years in Chicago working with immigrant rights advocates. Ward served as a senior fellow at the Southern Poverty Law Center and as executive director at the Western States Center. He worked to understand the motivations of alt-right groups, and he helped start local anti-hate task forces. Ward studied how stochastic terrorism can arise when a population or individual has been "othered". He became executive vice president of Race Forward, a racial justice organization. Ward testified before Congress on anti-democracy extremism following the January 6th US Capitol attack.

In 2022, Ward appeared on a PBS Metrofocus episode called "The Normalization of Antisemitism". Ward told host Jenna Flanagan that antisemitism "is not a form of religious bigotry. It’s a form of racialized bigotry." In the 2023 short film We’ve Been Here Before, Ward and director Jacob Kornbluth discussed the impact of the “Great Replacement Theory” on hateful acts by white nationalists, including mass shootings and antisemitic attacks.

== Awards ==
- 2021 Civil Courage Prize
- Peabody-Facebook Futures Media Award

== Selected works ==
- "Skin in the Game: How Antisemitism Animates White Nationalism", The Public Eye, 2017
- "As White Supremacy Falls Down, White Nationalism Stands Up", Pop Culture Collaborative, 2017
- “How I Came to Understand Racism in America—and What We Can Do About It”, American Educator, 2022
- "Skin in the Game Revisited", Lewis & Clark Law Review, 2024
