= The ick =

Slang term for romantic disgust

In Generation Z slang, the ick is used to describe a feeling of disgust that arises towards a love interest, usually after a specific, often trivial, behavior. The phrase was popularized by Love Island in 2017 and attracted further attention on TikTok in 2020, where many videos feature women listing their icks.

== History ==
The first documented use of the ick in this meaning was on an episode of Ally McBeal that aired in 1998. The phrase also appeared in the 2003 episode of Sex and the City, "The Ick Factor". It was popularized by Olivia Attwood, a 2017 contestant on Love Island. She said "When you've seen a boy, and got the ick, it doesn't go... it's caught you, and it's taken over your body. It's just ick. I can't shake it off." In 2020, catching the ick became common parlance on TikTok.

== Description ==
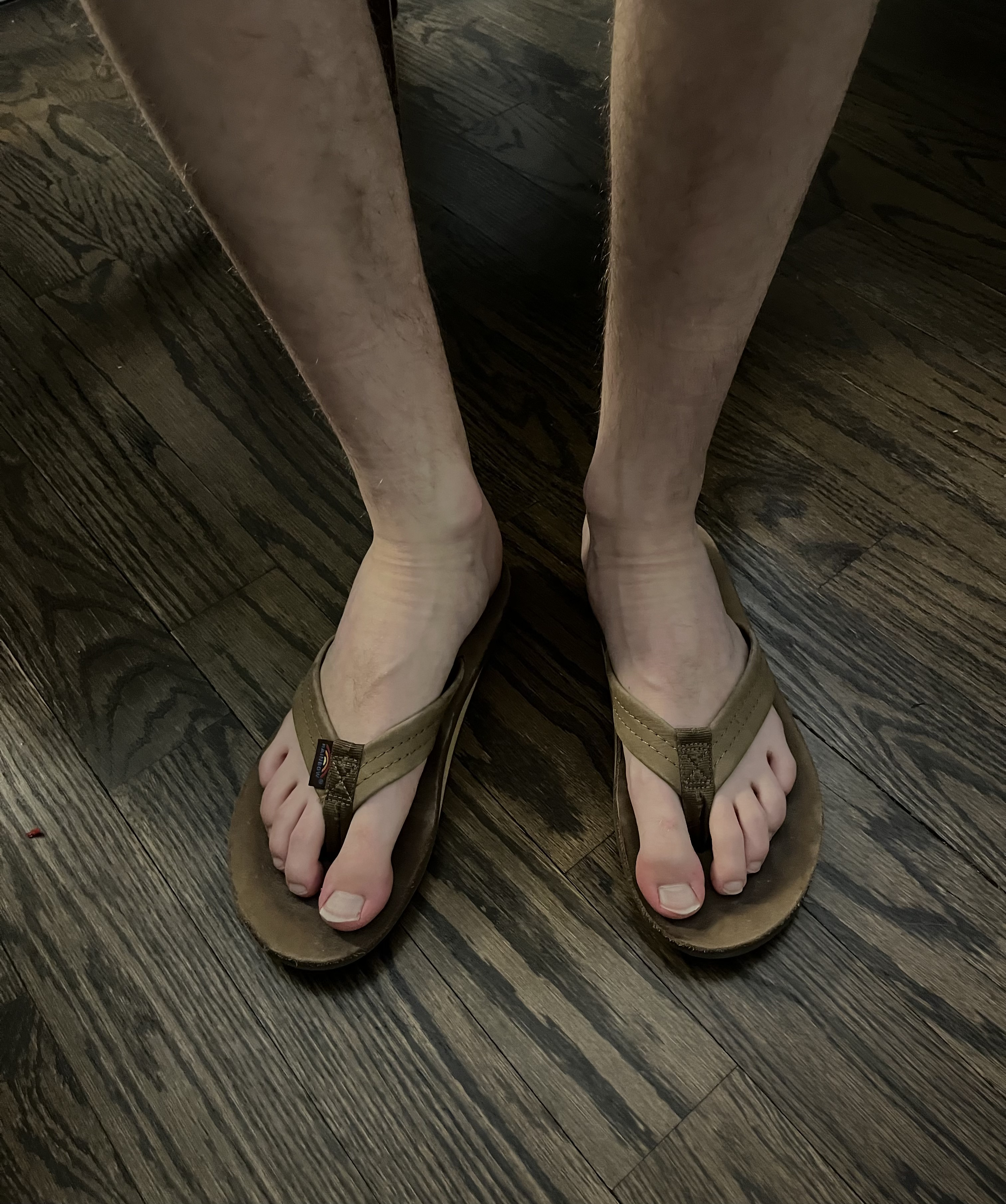
Some individuals may get the ick from a person walking in flip-flops such as these.

The ick commonly occurs in the initial period of attraction, before a relationship has developed the loyalty that allows people to overlook small flaws. The ick can arise after specific triggers, often trivial behaviors; The Guardian gave examples such as not using a pillowcase, walking angrily while wearing flip flops, letting legs dangle while sitting at a barstool, or having crusty red sauce at the corners of the mouth after eating spaghetti. New York calls it "that cringey, unsettling feeling you get in your guts when someone you were previously enamored with becomes wholly repulsive to you".

Icks are defined as trivial matters, rather than wide compatibility gaps like willingness to have children or strong religious views. The Observer wrote that "the litany of humiliation is more fine-grained than observational comedy. It felt like a new form, one with the attentiveness of poetry to intangible indignities. Hard to explain, impossible to justify, immediately resonant."

Psychologist Becky Spelman told The Independent that the ick might arise when we find "our unconscious mind reacting to some fundamental incompatibilities between us and the person to whom we were so recently attracted... Because of the initial rush of attraction, we've chosen to overlook these fundamental incompatibilities and to pursue a relationship with them. However, when there are serious incompatibilities, problems will emerge at some point."

Some people intentionally induce the ick, imagining their crush doing ick-inducing activities to soften the emotional toll of unrequited love.

== See also ==
- Glossary of Generation Z slang
