= Spiritually Israeli =

Internet slang term used as a pejorative

The phrase "spiritually Israeli" is an internet meme and pejorative term critical of Israel that emerged on social media platforms in 2025, used to describe people, brands, cultural trends, or phenomena that the speaker finds vapid, soulless, commercially hollow, or inauthentic. Use of the phrase does not require any actual connection to Israel, and it has been applied to pop stars, sports teams, consumer goods, and internet trends regardless of their national origin. The phrase has been criticized as promoting antisemitic stereotypes and cited as an example of rising antisemitism on the internet.

== Origins ==
In January 2024, during the Gaza war, an Israeli artist named Albert Levi posted a TikTok video of his paintings while dressed in an Israeli military uniform, and said: "I'm an artist from Israel and this is my art." Responding comments ranged from the appreciative to criticisms calling his work "materialistic" and "soulless". Subsequently, a meme emerged, in which Levi's post was parodied in other kinds of things regarded as materialistic. The first documented use of the phrase itself came in May 2025, when a user on the social media platform X commented "This is Spiritually Israeli" on a video of a matcha party in Dubai. The post received around 10,000 likes and helped spread the term across platforms. By mid-2025, the phrase had become a common shorthand on TikTok and X for mocking mainstream pop culture, corporate aesthetics, and trends perceived as manufactured or overcommercialized.

== Usage and spread ==
The phrase is applied broadly and without regard to any actual Israeli or Jewish connection, and often from a place of a lack of familiarity with Israeli culture. It is frequently used to label targets deemed culturally vapid and to express anti-corporatism. Targets have included musicians Taylor Swift, Justin Bieber, and Gracie Abrams, the toy trend Labubu dolls, the Burning Man festival, QR code menus, colored contact lenses, the video game League of Legends, Dubai chocolate, matcha drinks, Snapchat, and the television series Friends, among many others. Representative examples cited by Allison Mimeles in an article for the Jewish Telegraphic Agency included comments such as "I hate when I get a matcha and it tastes spiritually Israeli" and "The way you played the victim felt spiritually Israeli." Meirav Arlosoroff described the phrase on Haaretz as "being attached to anything negative, hypocritical or embarrassing on social media."

The Los Angeles Dodgers' victory in the 2024 World Series became one of the more widely circulated applications of the term. Because the Dodgers spent far more on player salaries than most other teams in Major League Baseball, critics framed their win as a triumph of financial dominance over competitive balance. Posts on social media referred to the team as "spiritually Israeli" and, in some cases, as the "Tel Aviv Dodgers"—even though the franchise has no Israeli players or organizational ties to Israel.

== Reactions ==
=== Jewish community ===
The phrase has drawn criticism from Jewish and Israeli commentators. The Instagram account @jewstalkjustice stated in a post that the term "relies on antisemitic stereotypes—portraying Jews as bloodthirsty, greedy, and obsessed with money", adding that antisemitism "doesn't need to use the word 'Jew' to express hatred of Jews".

Caren Leven, executive director of the Baltimore Zionist District, wrote in the Jewish News Syndicate that the phrase represented "old stereotypes dressed up in modern slang", observing that using "Israeli" as shorthand for being "too assertive or too visible" reflected a broader discomfort with Jewish pride and strength.

Mira Fox, writing in The Forward, connected the term to the antisemitic concept of "rootless cosmopolitanism", which historically portrayed Jews as a corrupting influence on European society, though she wrote that the phrase also functions specifically as a marker of corporate blandness in contemporary usage. She writes that the term's users are "cultivating an aesthetic of hipsterdom".

Ynet wrote that "replacing the word 'Jewish' with 'Israeli' masks age-old stereotypes portraying Jews as greedy or manipulative."

Allison Mimeles wrote an article in the Jewish Telegraphic Agency (JTA) about the spread of the term "spiritually Israeli" which she framed through an American Jewish Committee statistic saying that 73% of American Jews reported experiencing antisemitism online.

Jewish teens in particular reported that the trend affected their sense of safety and willingness to express their identities. A Jewish American high school student in New Jersey told the JTA that because of trends like this one, she sometimes tucks her Star of David necklace under her shirt in certain settings, saying "I'm scared of what they've seen on social media." Israeli American twin highschoolers also from New Jersey emphasised that the phrase uses the word "Israeli" rather than "Israeli government", a distinction they said leads to negative perceptions of Israeli people more broadly.

The Nexus Project describes the meme as not inherently antisemitic, but "a vessel for genuine antisemitism" in a category of online content that attacks Jewish culture and identity and acts as an on-ramp to antisemitic conspiracism.

Dr. Liram Koblentz-Stenzler, head of the Extremism and Antisemitism Desk at the International Institute for Counter-Terrorism, argues that the phrase underwent a process of semantic change from a neutral or ambiguous descriptor to a personal insult implying negative associations with Israeli and Jewish identity.

=== Other responses ===
Vocal Politics, a media outlet covering the global south, posted a TikTok video arguing that the phrase was a cultural response to two years of Israel's war in Gaza and had become synonymous for "corruption, deceit, colonial arrogance, or just criticising stuff they hate".

Some Israelis and diaspora Jews have responded by attempting to reclaim the phrase ironically. On the subreddit r/Israel, users suggested using "spiritually Israeli" to affectionately describe quirks of Israeli culture, with examples including love of cucumbers, aversion to rain, and wearing casual clothes to formal events.

=== Analysis ===
Mira Fox, writing in The Forward, characterised the shift in Israel's perceived cultural standing as a significant reversal from earlier decades, when Israel cultivated an international image as a small democracy and technology innovator. Since the October 7 attacks and the subsequent Gaza war, that image has changed for many online communities, such that support of Israel has become, in certain cultural spaces, associated with the mainstream and corporate. Fox said that the people most likely to use the phrase are "cultivating an aesthetic of hipsterdom", but that most consumers continue to patronize large brands regardless, and that Israel similarly does not require cultural cachet to sustain its political alliances.

== See also ==
- Antisemitism during the Gaza war
- Glossary of 2020s slang
- Goyslop
- New antisemitism
- Normalization of antisemitism
- Spiritually Japanese
