= Matcha latte =

Matcha-flavoured milk drink

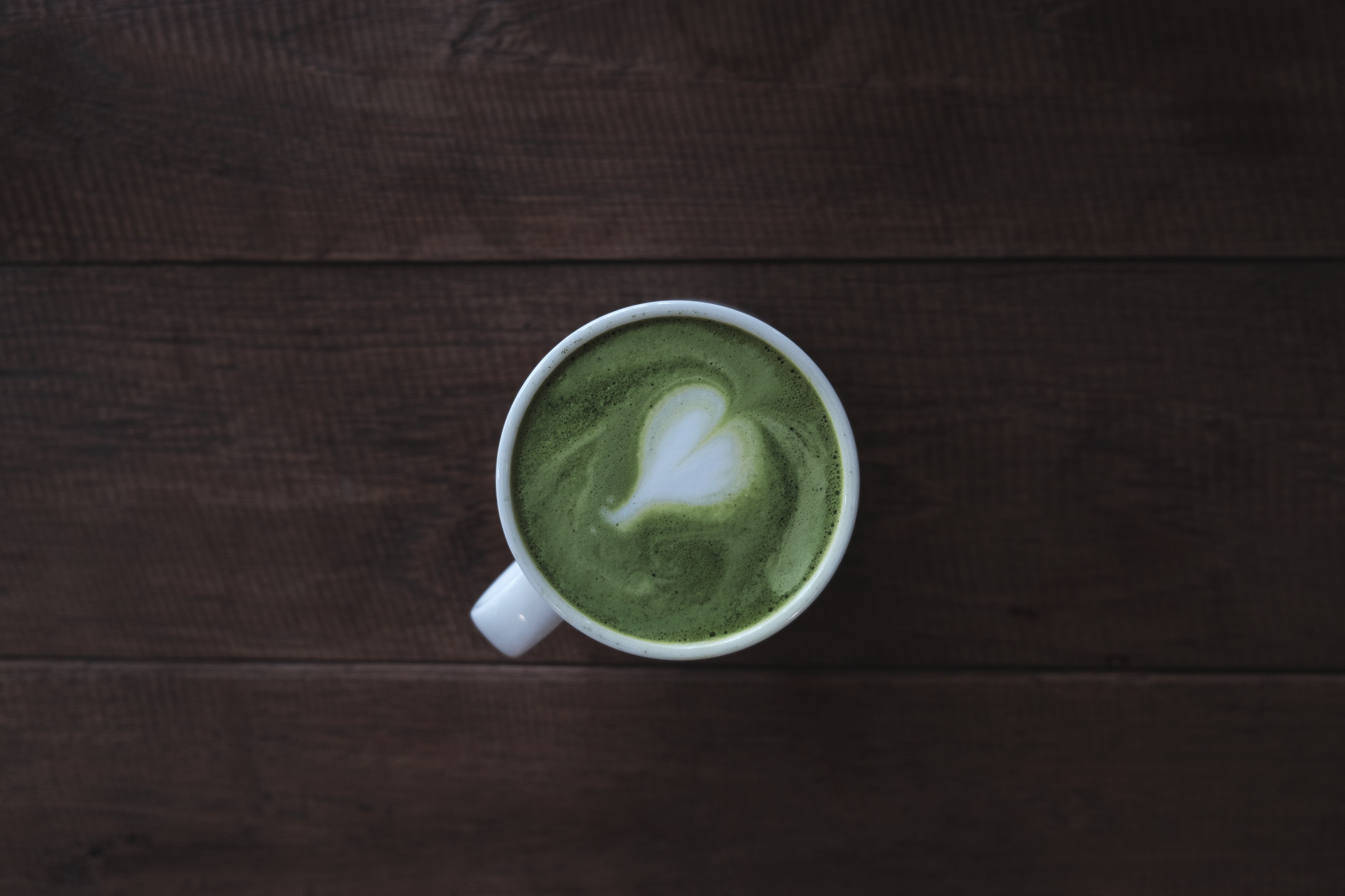
- A hot matcha latte with latte art
- Type: Beverage (hot and iced)
- Place of origin: Japan
- Associated cuisine: Japanese cuisine
- Main ingredients: Matcha and milk

Matcha latte (抹茶ラテ) is a beverage made by combining matcha with milk or a milk substitute. It can be served hot or iced and is considered a tea-based counterpart to the traditional coffee latte. Matcha lattes rose to international prominence in the 2020s due to social media visibility, expansion by major cafe chains, and their association with wellness-oriented lifestyle aesthetics.

== History ==
=== Origins of matcha ===
Japanese matcha is an adaptation of the Chinese powdered tea known as mòchá (末茶), which was popularized in China during the Song Dynasty. During that period, specialized utensils including whisks were used to froth a powdered tea drink. Japanese monks traveled to China and encountered the powdered drink practices in temples there. It is believed that the Zen monk Eisai brought back tea seeds and powdered tea preparation rituals from China in the late 12th century.

While the technique of grinding tea into powder and frothing with a whisk originated in China, Japan adapted and refined this tradition, developing specific cultivation techniques such as growing tea under shade. In Japan, matcha was initially consumed in monasteries and later became closely associated with Zen Buddhist practice and elite tea gatherings during the medieval period. These practices developed into the Japanese tea ceremony, known as chanoyu (茶の湯) or sadō/chadō (茶道; 'the way of tea'), in which matcha is prepared by whisking powdered tea with hot water using a bamboo whisk, or chasen (茶筅).

=== Emergence of modern matcha ===
The modern form of matcha, characterized by its deep green color and mellow flavor, developed gradually between the 15th and 16th centuries in Uji, Kyoto. This development was following closely with the adoption of a unique shaded cultivation method known as Ōishita saibai. Although this technique was originally developed as an effective measure to prevent frost damage, it resulted in the increased production of theanine, contributing to the creation of the distinctive flavor profile of matcha.

In the 16th century Azuchi-Momoyama period, matcha-flavored kakigōri (shaved ice) made its first appearance, followed by the emergence of matcha ice cream during the Meiji era in the 19th century. During the 20th century, a variety of wagashi (Japanese sweets) infused with matcha were developed.

As matcha spread globally in the late 20th and early 21st centuries, new ways of consuming it emerged, including sweetened beverages such as the modern matcha latte.

=== Introduction to Western cafés ===
The modern matcha latte is a Western adaptation that emerged in cafés in the late 20th and early 21st centuries. Its growth accelerated when Starbucks introduced its matcha latte in 2006, followed by Dunkin' with its own version in 2020. These chains helped mainstream the drink among younger consumers.

=== Popularity on social media ===
The drink became widely popular in the 2020s due to its visibility on TikTok and Instagram, where influencers showcased brightly colored matcha beverages as part of “clean” and wellness-focused aesthetics. In the United Kingdom, Blank Street Coffee has been credited with helping popularize the drink.

Some tea specialists have criticized commercial matcha lattes for using lower-grade, generic powdered green tea instead of actual matcha, which in Japan refers only to dried, unrolled shade-grown tea known as "tencha" (碾茶) that is then stone-ground. This is often referred to as "ceremonial grade" matcha in Western countries, although no such term or classification exists in Japan. Reports from Japan have also warned of shortages of matcha linked to increased global demand. The rapid growth in global demand has also led to increased concerns about counterfeit matcha and market instability, with reports describing the modern matcha trade as “the Wild West” due to fraud and inflated resale prices. Critics argue that Western consumers sometimes misunderstand the drink, treating it primarily as a trend while overlooking its cultural and ceremonial roots.

== Preparation ==
A person whisking matcha powder

A matcha latte is prepared by whisking matcha or green tea powder with a small amount of hot water to form a concentrated mixture. Milk or a milk substitute such as oat, almond, or soy milk is then added. The drink may be sweetened using sugar, simple syrup, honey, or vanilla.

== Characteristics ==
The beverage is known for its vibrant green pigment, rich texture, and subtle earthy flavor. It has been described by Vogue as an appealing alternative to coffee, especially among consumers seeking a beverage associated with wellness culture.

== Variations ==
Matcha lattes commonly appear in several variations, including:

- Iced matcha lattes, often shaken with ice
- Flavored versions, such as vanilla, lavender, or brown sugar
- Layered fruit drinks, including strawberry matcha and banana matcha lattes popularized on social media
- Matcha-espresso "dirty matcha," which combines matcha with a shot of espresso
- Matcha has also appeared in desserts, pancakes, mousse, and bubble tea as part of its rise in global food culture.

== Commercialization ==
Matcha lattes have become widely available across major cafe chains like Starbucks and Dunkin' Donuts, as well as independent coffee shops and wellness brands. The popularity has coincided with increased marketing of matcha as a "health-conscious" alternative to coffee.

== Social connotations ==
In 2025, posts on social media platforms began to associate the matcha latte with an online masculine archetype known as the “performative male.”
