= Tote bag =

Large, open-topped hand bag

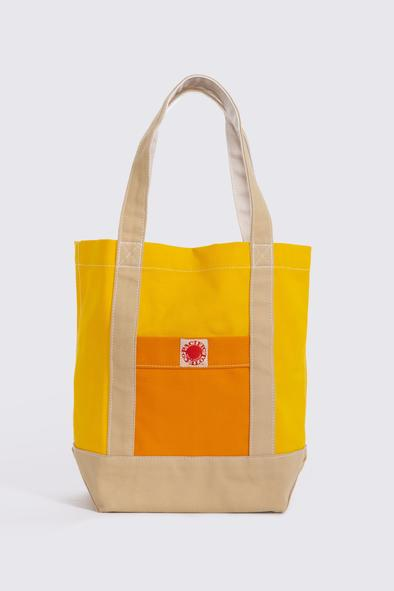
A tote bag

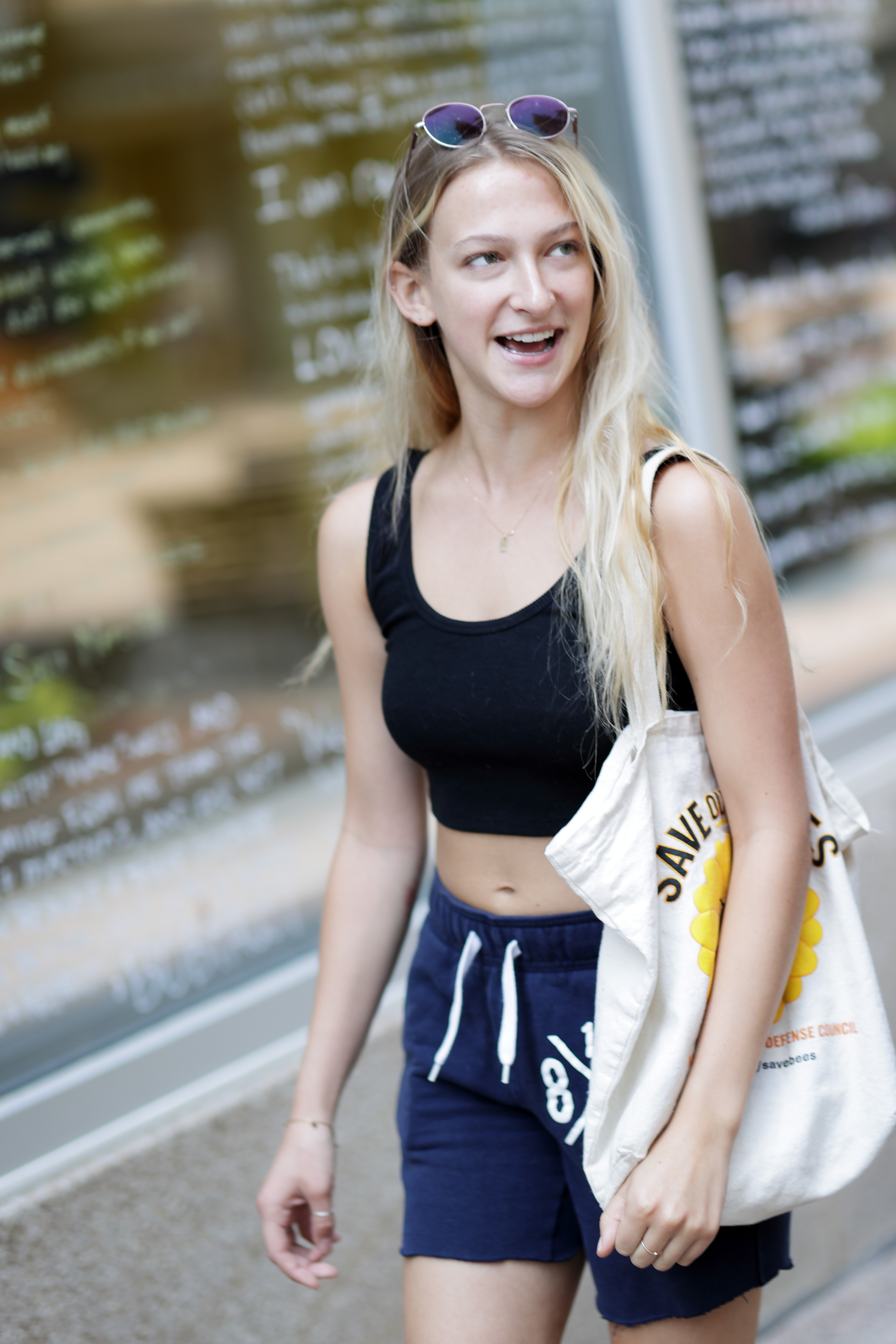
A tote bag being carried over the shoulder

A tote bag (colloquially, tote; or cloth bag) is a large, typically unfastened bag with parallel handles that emerge from the sides of its pouch.

Tote bags are often used as reusable shopping bags. The archetypal tote bag is made of sturdy cloth, perhaps with thick leather at its handles or bottom; leather versions often have a pebbled surface. Fabrics include natural canvas and jute, or nylon and other easy-care synthetics. These may degrade with prolonged exposure to sunlight. Many low-cost totes are made from recycled matter, from minimally processed natural fibers, or from byproducts of processes that refine organic materials.

Tote bags are open bags (unfastened bags), since they usually have no zipper or other closure mechanism (no fasteners).

== Etymology ==
The word tote is a colloquial term of North American English origin meaning "to carry" or "to transport", generally in relation to a heavy load or burden. It is first recorded in Virginia in 1677, but its etymology is uncertain. A posited West African origin has been discredited.

The term tote bag is first recorded in 1900.

== Environmental concerns ==
Recently, tote bags have been sold as a more eco-friendly replacement for disposable plastic bags, given they can be reused multiple times. They have also been given away as promotional items. A study by the UK Environment Agency found that cotton canvas bags have to be reused at least 131 times before they can match the carbon expenditure of a single disposable plastic bag, and up to 327 times if the plastic bags are used as bin liners. Another 2018 study by the Danish Environmental Protection Agency found that cotton bags would need to be used 52 times with regard to climate change, and up to 7,100 times considering all environmental indicators. Meanwhile, tote bags made from recycled polypropylene plastic require 11 (up to 26 when considering reuse as bin liners for plastic bags) reuses to match.

A 2014 study of U.S. consumers found that the 28% of respondents who own reusable bags forgot them on approximately 40% of their grocery trips and used the bags only about 15 times each before discarding them. About half of this group typically chose to use plastic bags over reusable ones, despite owning reusable bags and recognizing their benefits. An increasing number of jurisdictions have mandated the phase-out of lightweight plastic bags to reduce land and ocean pollution. In order to provide an incentive for consumers to remember reusable bags more often these laws establish a minimum price for bags at checkout and require either paper, reusable fabric tote bags, or thick reusable plastic bags.
