= Shabu =

Shabu or syabu may refer to:

- Shabu-shabu, a Japanese variant of hot pot
- Shabu, a slang term for the drug methamphetamine, used in Malaysia, Hong Kong, Philippines, Japan, Indonesia, and Pakistan
- Ya ba, also called shabú (Philippines), pills with a mixture of methamphetamine and caffeine prevalent throughout Asia.
- Shabu, a fictional genie from the sitcom Just Our Luck
- Shabu, one of the traditional dances of Himachal Pradesh
- Shabu, a name for tapioca in Bengali cuisine
- Shabu, Iran, (شبو), a village in South Khorasan Province, Iran
- Shabu, Qinzhou (沙埠镇), town in Qinnan District, Qinzhou, Guangxi, China
- Shabu, Taizhou, Zhejiang (沙埠镇), town in Huangyan District, Taizhou, Zhejiang, China
