= Antisemitism on social media =

Antisemitism on social media can manifest in various forms such as emojis, GIFs, memes, comments, and reactions to content. Studies have categorized antisemitic discourse into different types: hate speech, calls for violence, dehumanization, conspiracy theories and Holocaust denial.

Up to 69% of Jews in the U.S. have reported encountering antisemitism online according to the 2022 report. Jews have encountered antisemitism either as targets themselves or by being exposed to antisemitic content on their media page.

== Background ==
Quint Czymmek, a German social scientist, cited in his paper a 2019 study that found that young European Jews (ages 16–34) are more prone to encountering antisemitic harassment or violence compared to their older counterparts. Additionally, these younger individuals identified the internet and social media as the primary domains where antisemitism poses the most significant challenge in the present day.

Researcher Sophie Schmalenberger revealed that expressions of antisemitism go beyond explicit, offensive language and images on social media. They also manifest in subtle, coded forms that can easily go unnoticed. According to Schmalenberger an example of this is observed on Facebook, where the German far-right party, Alternative für Deutschland (AfD), has deliberately avoided referencing the Holocaust in its posts about the Second World War. Furthermore, the party employed antisemitic language and rhetoric, subtly normalizing antisemitism.

Algorithms seem to have played a significant role in amplifying antisemitism, as they are designed to prioritize content based on user engagement. This means that posts with higher engagement, including likes, dislikes, shares, and comments (including counter comments), are more prominently displayed to users. The issue arises because user reactions to posts also trigger rewarding dopamine responses. Consequently, the algorithmic emphasis on outrageous content, which tends to generate the most engagement, incentivizes users to contribute more hateful content. Two studies, provided exclusively to USA Today, found that Facebook, Instagram, and X (formerly Twitter) users to tropes and conspiracies. The 2023 result, researchers say, is provoking dangerous ideas as antisemitic incidents surge to historic levels.

Concerns have arisen among critics regarding the prevalence of antisemitism on social media, posing a significant issue for both the Jewish community and wider public discourse. While traditional methods of recording hate crimes, such as police crime records and the Crime Survey of England and Wales, have shown improvement, critics have said there remains a substantial underreporting of both online and offline antisemitic incidents. This discrepancy gives rise to a notable "dark figure" in the overall assessment of the problem.

Examples of antisemitic statements reported on social media include: "Jews are rats", "All Jews are greedy" and "I'm glad the holocaust [sic] happened". A study conducted by the Ruderman Family Foundation and the Network Contagion Research Institute, released in July 2023, revealed Israel as the most attacked country on social media. X (formerly Twitter) users mentioned Israel in connection with human rights violations 12 times more than China, 38 times more than Russia, 55 times more than Iran, and 111 times more than North Korea. Notably, during the 2021 Israel–Palestine crisis, the use of anti-Israel tropes surged. This escalation was accompanied by the release of a February 2022 Amnesty International report labeling Israel as an apartheid state.

The researchers also observed an increase in anti-Semitic comments on Twitter, which correlated with real-world Jewish-targeted hate crime incidents. The highest point coincided with conspiracy theories related to COVID-19 and the 2021 assault on the Capitol in Washington by supporters of Donald Trump.

Michael Bossetta, a researcher at Sweden's Lund University, points out that antisemitic content represents a tiny fraction of the traffic on social media. In his chapter in the book, he says most studies find that antisemitic content totals less than 1% of the total number of posts worldwide (as of the year 2022). In one major survey, it was 0.00015%.

In their annual report "Antisemitic incidents in Germany 2023", the Federal Association of Departments for Research and Information on Antisemitism e.V. (RIAS) has found that 21 percent of all recorded antisemitic incidents took place online in that year. While the relation of the percentage of online antisemitism to the total of antisemitic incidents decreased compared to the previous year, the absolute numbers still increased. In 2022, RIAS recorded 853 cases of online antisemitism directed towards individuals or organizations compared to 999 cases in 2023. General hate speech and antisemitic rhetoric was not counted in that statistic. Most commonly, antisemitism online occurred via direct messages, and of those 999 cases, 51 percent took place on social media platforms.

== Platforms ==
=== TikTok ===
TikTok, according to researchers and ratings, is very popular among young people and is widely used for news purposes, political platforms, and following significant public figures. Due to its widespread usage, "TikTok has become a magnet and a hotbed for violent and extremist content," the Israeli researchers Gabriel Weimann and Natalie Masri write in their chapter.

A study conducted between February 2020 to May 2021 by Weimann and Masri found a 41% increase in antisemitic posts, a 912% increase in antisemitic comments, and a 1,375% increase in antisemitic usernames. For example, a song about Jewish people being killed in Auschwitz was accessed more than six million times worldwide.

According to the CCDH, TikTok, in particular, is falling in banning accounts that directly target Jewish users. The study reveals that the platform only removes 5 percent of accounts engaged in activities such as sending direct messages promoting Holocaust denial. In 2023, Jewish American celebrities signed a letter to TikTok stating TikTok was not safe for Jewish users.

The Anti-Defamation League released a study in November 2023 that suggested loopholes in TikTok's moderation were being exploited for the purpose of spreading antisemitism. Photo Mode, which allows users to upload photos as a slideshow, and the use of hate messages and slurs in hashtags, were found to slip through more of TikTok's methods of content moderation.

In December 2023, during the Republican Party presidential primary debate in the United States, candidate Nikki Haley referenced research conducted by Anthony Goldbloom, the founder of data science startup Kaggle, to argue for the banning of TikTok, claiming that "For every 30 minutes that someone watches TikTok every day, they become 17% more antisemitic and more pro-Hamas." In response, TikTok asserted via Twitter that Haley's "statement is 100% false."

=== Instagram ===
According to a 2021 report, there are "millions" of results for hashtags relating to antisemitic conspiracy theories on Instagram.

A report by the CST released in 2021 investigated antisemitism on Instagram. Following 27 trending antisemitic hashtags, for example: #gasjews, #israhell, #zionistagenda etc., which indicated a significant use of antisemitic hashtags on the platform. Other antisemitic material is shared in less explicit ways, through jokes and memes based on Jewish stereotypes, and often downplays the antisemitism to comedy and conspiracies.

On Instagram, antisemitism is perpetrated not only by users but also by hackers who hijack accounts to spread antisemitic content. On its Instagram feed, the Berlin Film Festival (Berlinale) temporarily displayed antisemitic information posted by anonymous hackers that was later removed. The posts that had been hacked quickly disappeared, containing antisemitic remarks regarding the war in Gaza and the Berlinale emblem. The festival made it clear that the posts did not represent its opinions and criticized the hacking.

=== X (formerly Twitter) ===
ADL examined the year between 2017 and 2018, determining that roughly 4.2 million antisemitic tweets were posted and reposted on Twitter during said time span. The percentage of tweets pulled in by a query that tested positive for antisemitism ranged from a low 8.9% in week 33 (August 13–19) to a high of 34.2% in week 18 (April 30–May 6).

Josephine Ballon, the head of legal at HateAid, said that to pursue a free speech platform it should be ensured that X (formerly Twitter) is a safe space for users and free of fear of being attacked or receiving death threats or Holocaust denial.

According to an article published in March 2023, antisemitism on X remains "higher than ever" with some worried about the platform descending into a "hellscape" filled with toxic, inflammatory content and misinformation.

X suspended the account of Kanye West after he tweeted an image of the Star of David with a swastika inside. The rapper's account had been suspended before for antisemitic tweets.

=== YouTube ===
According to findings from the Institute for Strategic Dialogue, there was a 4963% increase in antisemitic comments on YouTube videos related to the conflict in the days following the October 7 attacks. YouTube recorded a total of 15,720 hateful comments against Jewish people in the week following the attack by Hamas, as revealed by the Institute for Strategic Dialogue.

According to the report, the attacks include comments featuring dehumanizing language, drawing inappropriate comparisons between Israelis and Nazis. They also propagated conspiracy theories, ranging from the unfounded notion that Jewish individuals control the media, political structures, and financial institutions to the claim that the Hamas attack was a 'false flag' orchestrated by Israel. Additionally, explicit threats were made against Jewish figures and officials, accompanied by the sharing and dissemination of graphic images, as well as calls for violence targeting Jewish officials.

=== Facebook ===
With 3.05 billion users (December 2023), Facebook is one of the largest social media platforms. As of 2016, 11% of available online antisemitic discourse (41,000 posts) is conducted on Facebook. The majority of these posts involve symbols or photos. Four percent of the discourse (1,500 posts) are calls to violence against Jews.

Two possible explanations for the relatively low scope of antisemitic discourse in relation to the network's popularity: either the users chose not to publicly upload offensive content on Facebook or the network puts a great deal of effort into removing such content.

Unlike X (formerly Twitter), hashtags such as #killthejews or #Holohoax don't exist on Facebook. Problematic usernames also were not found. Discourse glorifying Hitler, however, was found, including groups such as Hitler memes or pages of far-right organizations. Almost all of the users who uploaded antisemitic content on Facebook did so using fabricated usernames, which is prohibited by Facebook's terms of service.

In a 2021 report, researchers collected 714 antisemitic posts between May and June which included Holocaust denial, and conspiracy theories with false claims about Jews "controlling" governments and banks, or orchestrating world events. The report concluded that Facebook acted on only 14 out of 129 posts reported to it (10.9%). The report stated that Facebook groups from which it sourced many of its sample posts, with titles such as "Exposing the new world order" and "Exposing Zionism", were still active. Facebook reacted to the allegations noting that they have increased their actions against hate speech 15 percent more since 2017.

According to sources, Facebook has increased its removal of antisemitic content and its rate of removals is higher than other social media. According to a 2023 report, Facebook has removed 35% of all antisemitic content in 2022 reported to the platform by the FOA in comparison to 23% of content removed in 2021.

=== Telegram ===
A report from Hope not Hate highlighted the prevalence of antisemitism within Telegram which has emerged as a primary refuge for individuals expelled from other social networks due to their extremist views. In 2021, critics argued that Telegram's lax moderation policies have allowed numerous channels dedicated to antisemitic conspiracies and overtly violent content to thrive. One such channel, "Dismantling the Cabal," promoting the New World Order conspiracy theory since February 2021, has amassed over 90,000 followers. Another channel, managed by an antisemitic QAnon supporter known as GhostEzra, has a following of 333,000.

In addition to these concerning findings, Hope not Hate discovered that a minimum of 120 Telegram groups and channels have shared the racist and antisemitic manifesto authored by the perpetrator of the Christchurch mosque attacks in New Zealand in March 2019, resulting in the deaths of 51 individuals. Despite this dissemination of harmful content, Telegram has taken no action against such materials according to Hope Not Hate.

== Responses ==
In interviews conducted by Czymmek, three young German Jewish adults disclosed that experiencing an antisemitic social media post left them with a profound sense of "loss of control," "unawareness of what would happen next," and despair over "the silence of other users." One of the study's participants decided to keep his Jewish identity on social media anonymous. "This anonymity protects me very much, it keeps the hate at bay."

The CEO of CCDH Imran Ahmed said that there are no limits within digital spaces, and people become radicalized without any boundaries. "The online spaces then have an effect on offline spaces because these people have worsened," Ahmed said. "The failure of these companies is a cost that's paid in lives."

In response to increased antisemitic incidents and a significant spike in reports since the start of the Israel-Hamas conflict, several universities have decided to take action. The University of Michigan (U-M) and New York University (NYU) are creating new institutes dedicated to researching and preventing antisemitism. The Raoul Wallenberg Institute, named for the Swedish businessman and humanitarian who saved thousands of Jews during the Holocaust, is being established by the University of Michigan. New York University (NYU) establish the NYU Center for the Study of Antisemitism with the help of a seven-figure donation. Center is anticipated to open in Fall 2024.

The parent company of Facebook and Instagram, Meta, announced a new policy to combat antisemitism by banning posts that misuse the term "Zionists" as a cover for hate speech directed towards Jews on July 9, 2024. With this modification, instances in which the term "Zionist" is used to degrade Jews, incite negative stereotypes, incite violence against Jews, or dispute the existence of Zionists fall within the expanded definition of antisemitic and "tier 1 hate speech."

Previously, on Meta social media platforms, the word "Zionist" was only allowed to be used in specific contexts, including when it was used to refer to Jews or Israelis. Following discussions with 145 stakeholders, including specialists in history, political science, law, civil rights, and human rights, the revised policy was developed.

Artificial intelligence has been used in some cases to help remove antisemitic hate on social media. AI is given specific keywords and phrases to flag and remove from the internet. However, it is very challenging for AI to distinguish between educational and harmful content, resulting in the unsuccessful removal of antisemitic hate online. In some cases, AI works counterintuitively, removing educational information rather than harmful rhetoric. For instance, an educational post about the Holocaust to counter Holocaust denial on social media was taken down due to AI's inability to understand the purpose of the usage of the keywords.

== Antisemitism following the 7 October attacks ==
According to a report by the Hebrew University of Jerusalem, antisemitism on social media increased following the October 7 attacks. The antisemitic content, according to the report, includes admiration of Adolf Hitler and the Holocaust, and advocating violence against Jewish individuals. This upswing in online antisemitic content not only fuels the dissemination of hatred but also reinforces the worldwide normalization and legitimization of antisemitism.

According to recent findings from the Institute for Strategic Dialogue, there was a 4963% increase in antisemitic comments on YouTube videos related to the conflict in the days following the 2023 Hamas-led attack.

== See also ==
- Anti-Zionism
- COVID-19 misinformation § Antisemitism
- Red triangle (Palestinian symbol)
- The Holocaust and social media
- Terrorism and social media
- Antisemitism on Wikipedia
- Normalization of antisemitism
