= Vagueposting =

Posting online without necessary context

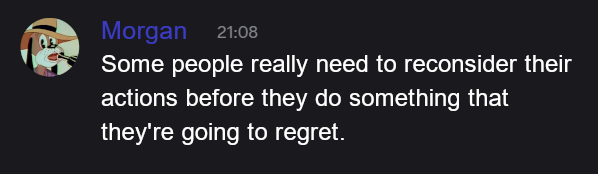
An example of a vaguepost

Vagueposting, or vaguebooking, is the act of posting online cryptically without context or otherwise necessary information needed to understand the post. Intentions vary, with some vagueposting happening for the sake of engagement bait from people who have a fear of missing out, while other instances happen as a failure of transparent communication.

== Definition ==
Vagueposting is when an online user makes a post without context, causing other users to ask for more information. It is similar to a subtweet, which also refers to a vague post, albeit one made to specifically call someone out with plausible deniability, as well as rage-baiting, another engagement tactic which requires provoking other users for a response back.

Zari Taylor, a researcher specializing in digital culture at New York University, argued that vagueposting was done for purposes of clickbait or controversy by prompting other users to interact with any given post, either to find clarity or interpret what it was about. One popular example of vagueposting, according to Rolling Stone and Fast Company, happened in 2026 when a user named Tamara made a comment on a TikTok video saying that she had bought 365 buttons, one for each day of the year, to keep her mindful about time. When other users asked follow-up questions about what she would do with the buttons, she responded, "Hey so it only has to make sense for me to do it and I don't feel like explaining it to anyone else."

== History ==
The term vaguebooking was originally coined to describe an intentionally vague Facebook post that prompted other users to follow up with the poster. While the term vagueposting dates back to 2011, usage exploded in the 2020s on Twitter and TikTok.
