= Pickme girl =

Internet meme and youth slang

Pick me behavior is an Internet slang term for actions where someone seeks external validation and approval by trying to prove they are different from or superior to their peers. A "pick me girl" refers to a female who exhibits this kind of behavior, whereas a "pick me boy" refers to a male who displays such behavior. Oftentimes, their intention is to increase their perceived value in the dating or social scene.

== Definition ==
The term is most commonly used to refer to a woman (a "pick me girl") who criticizes other women, mocks traditionally feminine interests, fakes masculine hobbies, or adopts specific viewpoints solely to appeal to the male demographic. They may also seek to make friends mainly or solely with men. Their behavior generally suggests that they perceive themselves to be, and wish to be, different from and superior to other women.

The term is sometimes used interchangeably with the "not like other girls" stereotype, where a woman rejects traditionally feminine traits and boasts about it in a comparative, competitive way. However, the two may not always correlate. A pick me girl may believe that women who are not traditional are morally inferior and thus undesirable. In this case, they do not see themselves as necessarily different, but rather as valuable or of higher standard.

From a sociological standpoint, pick me behavior is often seen as a form of internalized misogyny and self-objectification. This behavior is possibly rooted in competition between women and the prioritization of male attention. Using the term incorrectly to describe women who are not traditionally feminine can reinforce gender essentialism and stereotypes.

Often presented humorously on social media, notably TikTok and X (formerly Twitter), the "pick me" stereotype has managed to span both female and male stereotypes. Male counterparts include the "pick me boy" and the performative male.

== History ==
The first notable occurrence of the expression appeared in a 2005 episode of the television series Grey's Anatomy, in which the character of Meredith Grey, portrayed by Ellen Pompeo, declares: "Pick me. Choose me. Love me." In the context of the scene, this line is addressed to Derek Shepherd, played by Patrick Dempsey, and expresses the wish to be preferred to his wife.

The expression "pick me girl" appeared on social networks as early as 2006, when Twitter users were already making fun of women who bragged about being married, as opposed to single women.

It gained popularity and its current meaning in 2016 when the hashtag, #TweetLikeAPickMe was introduced. With numerous publications mocking women seeking to appear more "unique" to attract men's attention, the phrase and its new definition began to catch on.

In the 2020s, the Internet meme became popular on TikTok, where female creators published parody videos criticizing this type of behavior. Between 2021 and 2024, TikTok videos associated with this hashtag reached over 2 billion views.
