= Lovejoy (band) =

English indie rock band

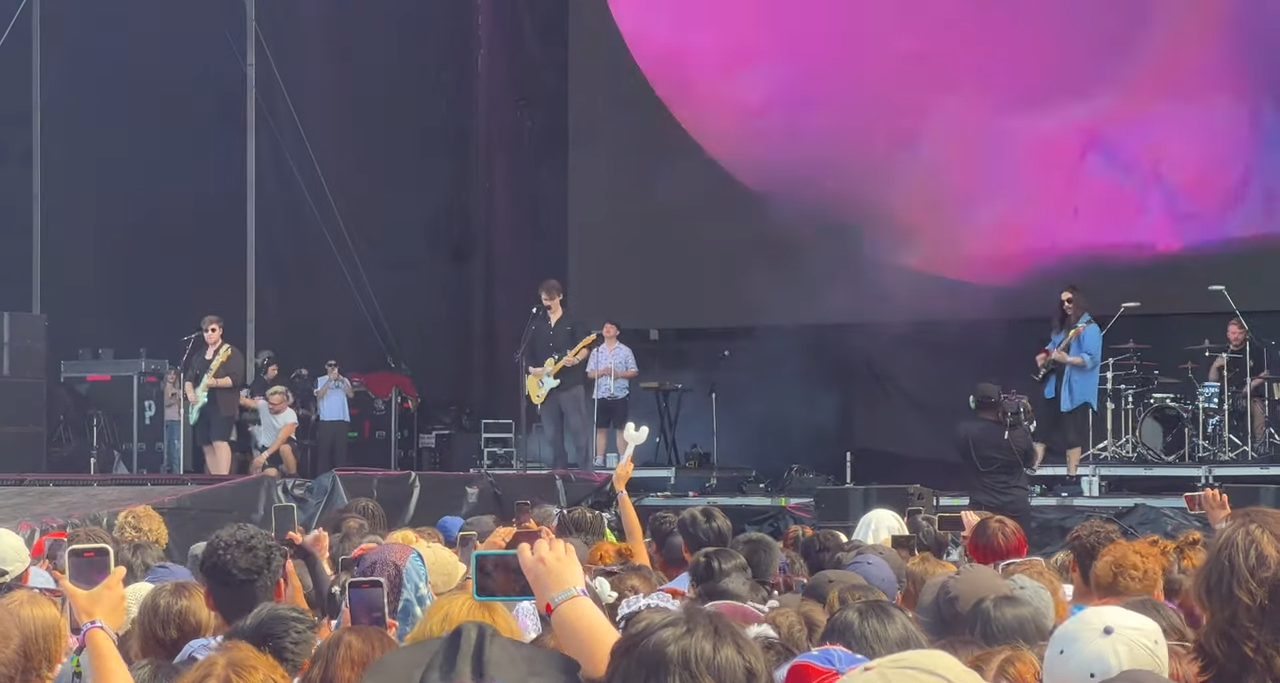
- Lovejoy performing at Lollapalooza in 2023. Left to right: Joe Goldsmith, William Gold, touring member Alan Osmundson, Ash Kabosu, Mark Boardman.

Background information
- Origin: Brighton, East Sussex, England
- Genres: Indie rock; pop-punk
- Years active: 2021–present
- Labels: AWAL; Anvil Cat; Warner
- Members: William Gold; Ash Kabosu; Mark Boardman; Joe Goldsmith

Lovejoy are an English indie rock band formed in Brighton in 2021. The band consists of lead vocalist and rhythm guitarist William Gold (a.k.a. Wilbur Soot), lead guitarist Joe Goldsmith, drummer Mark Boardman and bassist Ash Kabosu. All four of the members share songwriting duties.

Their debut EP, Are You Alright?, was released on 8 May 2021. Their second EP, Pebble Brain, was released on 14 October 2021. Their third EP, Wake Up & It's Over, was released on 12 May 2023.

The band's debut album, One Simple Trick, was released on 3 October 2025, via Warner and Revolution Records.

Their fourth EP, Second to One, was released on 31 July 2026.

== History ==
=== 2021–2022: Formation, Are You Alright?, and Pebble Brain ===
Lovejoy was founded by William Gold and Joe Goldsmith in 2021. The two met from previously playing in the same folk group. Gold previously gained a following online for his Twitch streams and YouTube videos, as well as his solo music. The band was originally called "Hang the DJ". The current name is after Benedict Lovejoy, a friend of the band, who would sit with them during their early days of songwriting. Before joining Lovejoy, drummer Mark Boardman had been studying editing at university, bass guitarist Ash Kabosu was working in TV broadcasting, and lead guitarist Joe Goldsmith was a tree surgeon. Gold met Kabosu, a friend of a friend, in a Smashburger shop in Brighton, and asked him if he'd like to join the band. During studio recording, the band hired Boardman on Fiverr, and after watching him perform, Gold invited him to join as a permanent member.

The band recorded their debut EP, Are You Alright?, in two days at Brighton Electric in March 2021. It was released on 8 May 2021, which saw Lovejoy debut at number 10 on Billboard's Emerging Artists chart on 20 May 2021. Their second EP, Pebble Brain, was recorded in August 2021 at Small Pond Recording Studios in Brighton, and released on 14 October 2021. The EP peaked at number 12 on the UK Albums Chart. The songs of this EP had the theme of failed romantic relationships, but also expand to political unrest. In October 2022, the band issued their first two EPs, as well as their cover of "Knee Deep at ATP", to vinyl for the first time. Prior to their large concert and festival performances, Lovejoy performed unadvertised gigs under pseudonyms. From November 2022, the band began to receive attention on mainstream radio, with airtime on BBC Radio 1, and on Dutch radio show "Welkom Bij De Club!" (transl. Welcome to the Club!). Their songs have also been featured on BBC Music Introducing.

=== 2023–2024: Wake Up & It's Over, and From Studio 4 ===
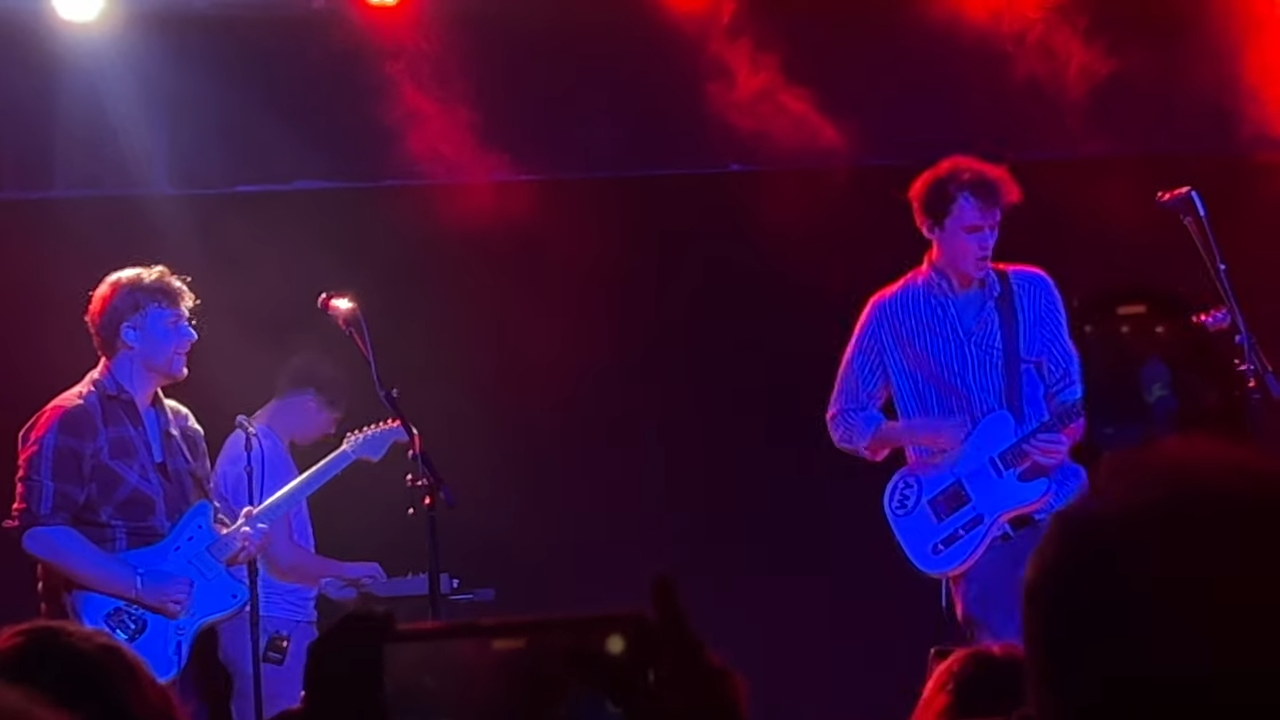
Joe Goldsmith and William Gold performing in Chicago, 2023

On 10 February 2023, Lovejoy released the single "Call Me What You Like" through AWAL. The single peaked at number 32 on the Official UK Top 40 chart. The song would later be featured on their third EP, Wake Up & It's Over, which was released on 12 May 2023 and debuted at number 5 on the UK Album Chart. In addition, "Portrait of a Blank Slate" from the EP was featured in the soundtrack for EA Sports FC 24. On 7 April 2023, under the Anvil Cat alias, the band surprise-released an EP titled From Studio 4. It contains acoustic versions of the songs from their debut EP, Are You Alright?, as well as a previously unreleased track, "Tomorrow".

In May 2023, the band performed in London for a Spotify event titled Our Generation. They released two songs from the session as part of Spotify Singles, including an acoustic version of "Call Me What You Like" and a cover of "The Perfect Pair" by Beabadoobee. Gold said the band had "been huge admirers of Beabadoobee for a while now and love the melody of this song, so it was great to give it our own Lovejoy twist".

In June 2023, the band appeared on the front cover of issue 77 of the music magazine Dork. On 25 June 2023, Lovejoy performed at Glastonbury Festival on the BBC Music Introducing stage. They have also performed at Rock Werchter, TRNSMT, the Montreux Jazz Festival, Osheaga, and Lollapalooza. They performed at Leeds Festival on 25 August 2023, and Reading Festival on 27 August 2023. They started their Wake Up & It's Over Tour across the United Kingdom in September 2023, notably with James Marriott as a support act for the Birmingham, London and Manchester shows. In June 2024, the band announced their first Australian shows would be taking place from August.

=== 2025–present: One Simple Trick, and Second to One ===
On 22 May 2025, the band teased the release of their debut album on YouTube. On 20 June 2025, the band released "With Rob As My Witness", the first promotional single for their debut album. On 18 July 2025, Lovejoy posted on Instagram that their debut album, titled One Simple Trick, would be released on 3 October 2025, stating it "took four years of overthinking". The band also announced the "One Simple Tour" - a tour of the United States and Canada to pair with the albums release. They played two new songs live: "Wasted Summer" on 18 August 2025, and "Foxholes" on 27 August 2025, with the former not making it onto the album tracklist. Their second single of the upcoming album, "Pay & Display", was released on 22 August 2025. The third single, "Common Touch", was released on 19 September 2025.

On 3 October 2025, Lovejoy released One Simple Trick on all platforms.

On 3 July 2026, Lovejoy released "Alphabet (Wasted Summer)" as a promotional single for their fourth EP. On 7 July 2026, Lovejoy posted on Instagram that the new EP would contain 4 songs that were scrapped from One Simple Trick, and would be released on 31 July 2026.

== Musical style and influences ==
Lovejoy's music has been described as indie rock and pop punk. Some of the band's influences include Los Campesinos! (Knee Deep At ATP remix was made as a thank you to them), The Strokes, Crywank, Arctic Monkeys, Bo Burnham, The Killers, and The Front Bottoms. In a 2023 interview with MTV, the band described their music as "Aromantic British Noises".

In an impromptu Q&A on the Lovejoy Reddit page, Gold stated that he was influenced by Brandon Flowers and The Killers while writing One Simple Trick.

== Members ==
Lovejoy Members

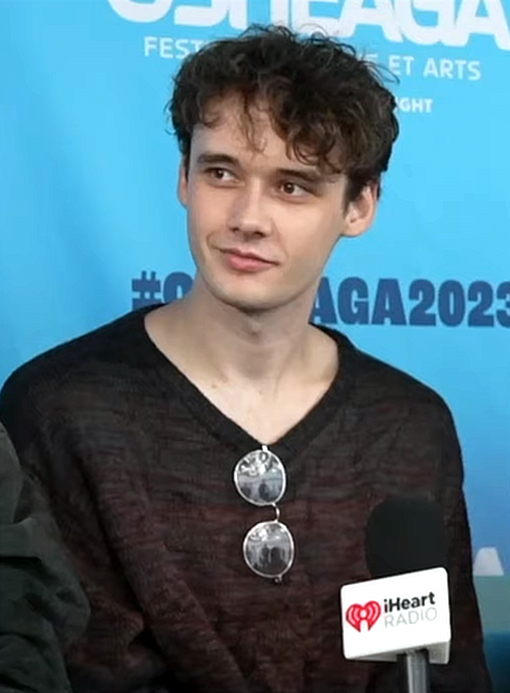
William Gold

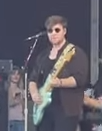
Joe Goldsmith

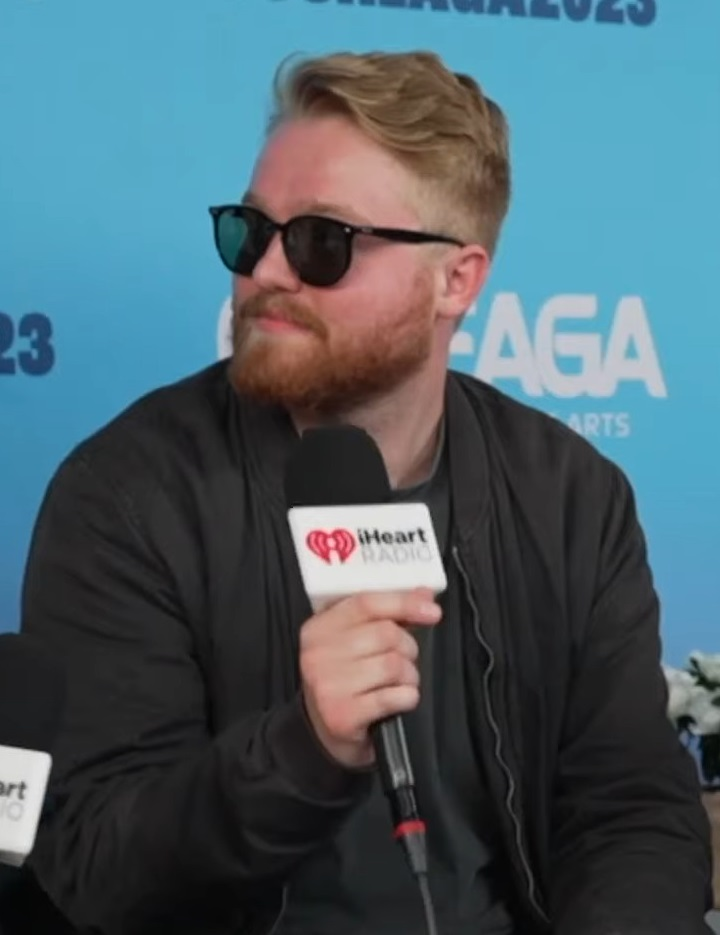
Mark Boardman

Band members

All members referenced by ASCAP's ACE Repertory.

- William Gold (known professionally as Wilbur Soot) – lead vocals, rhythm guitar, songwriting (2021–present)
- Joe Goldsmith – lead guitar, backing and lead vocals, songwriting (2021–present)
- Ashley Stevens (known professionally as Ash Kabosu) – bass, songwriting (2021–present)
- Mark Boardman – drums, backing vocals, songwriting (2021–present)

Touring members

Touring personnel differs between shows.

- Leandra Badruzaman – trumpet, keyboards (2022–present)
- Isaac Beer – trumpet (2022)
- Zoe Webber – trumpet, keyboards (2022–2023)
- Alan Osmundson – trumpet, keyboards, guitar (2023–present)
- Jackie Coleman – trumpet, keyboards (2023–present)

== Discography ==
Lovejoy discography
- Studio albums: 1
- EPs: 5
- Compilation albums: 1
- Singles: 8
- Music videos: 16
- Streaming-exclusive releases: 1

=== Studio albums ===
List of albums with selected details and chart positions
Title	Details
One Simple Trick	Released: 3 October 2025; Label: Anvil Cat, Revolution Records, Warner; Format: Digital download, streaming, vinyl

=== Extended plays ===
List of EPs with selected details and chart positions
Title	Details	Peak chart positions										Certifications
Title	Details	UK	AUS	CAN	FIN	IRE	LTU	NLD	NZ	SWE	US	Certifications
Are You Alright?	Released: 8 May 2021; Format: Digital download, streaming	—	—	—	—	—	—	—	—	—	—	
Pebble Brain	Released: 14 October 2021; Label: Anvil Cat; Format: Digital download, streaming	12	—	41	21	14	3	35	11	24	128	BPI: Silver
From Studio 4 (Note: This EP was released as "Anvil Cat". All tracks in the EP also credit "Lovejoy" as a featuring artist.)	Released: 7 April 2023; Label: Anvil Cat, AWAL; Format: Digital download, streaming, vinyl	—	—	—	—	—	—	—	—	—	—	
Wake Up & It's Over	Released: 12 May 2023; Label: Anvil Cat, AWAL; Format: Cassette, CD, digital download, streaming	5	27	—	—	10	17	—	25	—	94	
Second to One	Released: 31 July 2026; Label: Anvil Cat; Format: CD, digital download, streaming, vinyl	—	—	—	—	—	—	—	—	—	—	
"—" denotes a recording that did not chart or was not released in that territory.

=== Compilation albums ===
List of compilation albums with selected details
Title	Details
Are You Alright? / Pebble Brain	Released: 14 October 2022; Label: Anvil Cat, AWAL; Format: LP

=== Streaming-exclusive releases ===
List of streaming-exclusive releases with selected details
Title	Details	Notes
Our Generation – Spotify Singles	Released: 3 May 2023; Label: Anvil Cat, AWAL	Spotify-exclusive dual single containing an acoustic version of "Call Me What You Like" and a cover of Beabadoobee's 2022 song "The Perfect Pair".

=== Singles ===
List of singles, with selected details and chart positions
Title	Year	Peak chart positions									Album
Title	Year	UK	UK Indie	AUS DL	CAN Rock	IRE	LTU	NZ Hot	US Alt.	US Rock	Album
"Knee Deep at ATP" (cover of Los Campesinos!)	2021	—	—	—	—	—	—	22	—	—	Non-album single (Note: "Knee Deep at ATP" was later included on the compilation Are You Alright?/Pebble Brain.)
"Call Me What You Like"	2023	32	7	41	49	48	90	5	5	25	Wake Up & It's Over
"Normal People Things"	2023	27	9	—	—	55	—	8	11	—	Non-album singles
"I'll Look Good When I'm Sober"	2024	— (Note: "I'll Look Good When I'm Sober" did not enter the UK singles chart, but peaked at number 31 on the UK Singles Sales Chart.)	—	—	—	—	—	—	—	—	Non-album singles
"With Rob As My Witness"	2025	—	—	—	—	—	—	—	—	—	One Simple Trick
"Pay & Display"	2025	—	—	—	—	—	—	—	36	—	One Simple Trick
"Common Touch"	2025	—	—	—	—	—	—	—	—	—	One Simple Trick
"Alphabet (Wasted Summer)"	2026	— (Note: "Alphabet (Wasted Summer)" did not enter the UK singles chart, but peaked at number 28 on the UK Singles Sales Chart.)	—	—	—	—	—	—	—	—	Second to One
"—" denotes a recording that did not chart or was not released in that territory.

=== Other charted songs ===
List of charted songs, with selected chart positions
Title	Year	Peak chart positions						Album
Title	Year	UK	UK Indie	IRE	LTU	NZ Hot	US Rock	Album
"Taunt"	2021	75	12	91	69	13	31	Are You Alright?
"One Day"	2021	54	5	58	39	10	26	Are You Alright?
"Sex Sells"	2021	93	18	—	93	14	35	Are You Alright?
"Cause for Concern"	2021	—	47	—	—	18	50	Are You Alright?
"Oh Yeah, You Gonna Cry?"	2021	67	23	74	82	14	29	Pebble Brain
"Model Buses"	2021	—	28	—	91	17	36	Pebble Brain
"Concrete"	2021	—	27	—	99	—	35	Pebble Brain
"Perfume"	2021	69	24	71	75	12	24	Pebble Brain
"You'll Understand When You're Older"	2021	—	34	—	—	—	43	Pebble Brain
"The Fall"	2021	64	21	70	72	13	26	Pebble Brain
"It's All Futile! It's All Pointless!"	2021	—	30	—	100	—	40	Pebble Brain
"Portrait of a Blank Slate"	2023	—	42	—	—	6	50	Wake Up & It's Over
"Consequences"	2023	—	—	—	—	12	—	Wake Up & It's Over
"Warsaw"	2023	—	—	—	—	18	—	Wake Up & It's Over
"It's Golden Hour Somewhere"	2023	—	—	—	—	16	—	Wake Up & It's Over
"—" denotes a recording that did not chart or was not released in that territory.

=== Other appearances ===
Title	Year	Album
"Privately Owned Spiral Galaxy" (cover of Crywank)	2022	Here You Go, You Do It: A Crywank Covers Compilation

=== Music videos ===
Title	Year	Director(s)	Album
"One Day"	2021	William Gold	Are You Alright?
"Taunt"	2021	William Gold	Are You Alright?
"Model Buses"	2021	William Gold	Pebble Brain
"Concrete"	2021	Ash Kabosu	Pebble Brain
"It's All Futile! It's All Pointless!"	2021	GreenForSure	Pebble Brain
"Knee Deep at ATP"	2022	Anni Scivious	Non-album single
"Call Me What You Like"	2023	Ash Kabosu; William Gold	Wake Up & It's Over
"It's Golden Hour Somewhere"	2023	Jondra Films	Wake Up & It's Over
"Portrait of a Blank Slate"	2023	Ted Nivison	Wake Up & It's Over
"Normal People Things"	2023	Ted Nivison	Non-album singles
"I'll Look Good When I'm Sober"	2024	Lovejoy	Non-album singles
"With Rob As My Witness"	2025	Aaron Bishop	One Simple Trick
"Pay & Display"	2025	Aaron Bishop	One Simple Trick
"Common Touch"	2025	Elodie Grenville	One Simple Trick
"Baptism"	2025	Aaron Bishop	One Simple Trick
"Perfect Blue"	2026	Elodie Grenville	One Simple Trick
"Alphabet (Wasted Summer)"	2026	Elodie Grenville	Second to One
"Snake Oil"	2026	Aaron Bishop	Second to One

== Touring history ==
- Northern Autumn Tour (2022)
- December Tour (2022)
- Inselaffe Tour (2023)
- Across the Pond Tour (2023)
- Wake Up & It's Over Tour (2023)
- Road to 100 Tour (2023)
- Right Way Up Australia Tour (2024)
- Resources for Teaching Tour (2024)
- One Simple Tour (2025)
