= Are You Alright? (EP) =

2021 EP by English rock band Lovejoy

EP by Lovejoy
- Released: 9 May 2021
- Recorded: March 2021
- Studio: Electric (Brighton)
- Genre: Indie rock
- Length: 12:07
- Producer: Cameron Nesbitt

Lovejoy chronology
Are You Alright? (2021)	Pebble Brain (2021)

Are You Alright? is the debut EP by English indie rock band Lovejoy, released independently on 9 May 2021. It contains four tracks and runs 12 minutes and 7 seconds. Due to UK charting rules the EP wasn't able to chart by itself, However, three out of the EP's four tracks charted on the UK Singles Chart, (Note: "Taunt", "One Day" and "Sex Sells" peaked on the chart at No. 75, No. 54 and No. 93 respectively. While the EP's other track "Cause for Concern" did not enter the UK Singles Chart, it entered the UK Independent Singles Chart on 27 May 2021 at No. 47.) and the band debuted at number 10 on Billboard's Emerging Artists chart on 20 May 2021. The name of the band's label, Anvil Cat Records, is a nod to the cover art of the EP. Over a year after its release, it was released on vinyl as a compilation album with Lovejoy's second EP Pebble Brain.

== Background ==
William Gold (stage name Wilbur Soot), an English YouTuber, streamer, and musician, had a previously established audience from his participation in SootHouse, his presence on both YouTube and twitch and the Dream SMP, a roleplaying Minecraft server. Additionally, he had already released several singles, an EP, Maybe I Was Boring, and an album, Your City Gave Me Asthma, prior to the release of Are You Alright? Thus, Lovejoy had gained a sizable following from Gold's fanbase even before the release of Are You Alright?

In early 2021, Gold formed the band Lovejoy with Joe Goldsmith, who had previously been in a folk group with him. They were joined by Ash Kabosu and Mark Boardman, and began immediately recording their first EP.

== Recording ==
The EP was recorded in two days in March 2021 at Brighton Electric. Gold told music magazine Dork that the band "didn’t get enough done" during the recording sessions due to how much it would have cost the band to keep returning to the studio to complete the recordings, and hence was forced to use his draft vocals on the EP. As a result of this, some of the lyrics of the songs on the EP are incorrect, leading to confusion among fans when they are played at concerts.

== Track listing ==
The description of the EP's official YouTube video credits William Gold, Joe Goldsmith, Ash Kabosu and Mark Boardman as writers. However, on streaming platforms, Gold and Goldsmith are solely credited as writers for all tracks.

Are You Alright? track listing
No.	Title	Length
1.	"Taunt"	2:13
2.	"One Day"	2:25
3.	"Sex Sells"	4:07
4.	"Cause for Concern"	3:22
Total length:		12:07

== Personnel ==
Lovejoy

- William Gold – lead vocals, rhythm guitar, writing
- Joe Goldsmith – lead guitar, writing
- Ash Kabosu – bass, writing (Note: Only credited as a writer in the description of the EP's official YouTube video, not on streaming platforms.)
- Mark Boardman – drums, writing

Production

- Cameron Nesbitt – producer
- Shaw Rayment – mastering
- Elsie Cairns – cover art

== From Studio 4 ==
From Studio 4

EP by Anvil Cat featuring Lovejoy
- Released: 7 April 2023
- Genre: Acoustic rock
- Length: 13:45
- Labels: Anvil Cat; AWAL

An acoustic version of Are You Alright?, titled From Studio 4, was released independently through Anvil Cat Records and AWAL on 7 April 2023 by Lovejoy under the alias "Anvil Cat", though all tracks on the EP also credit "Lovejoy" as a featuring artist. It features an acoustic version of the scrapped instrumental track originally meant as an introduction for Are You Alright?, titled "Tomorrow". From Studio 4 was released on vinyl in the United States on 24 November 2023 for RSD Black Friday.

=== Track listing ===
All tracks written by William Gold and Joe Goldsmith, except for "Tomorrow", which is written by Gold, Goldsmith, Ash Kabosu and Mark Boardman.

From Studio 4 track listing
No.	Title	Length
1.	"Tomorrow" (acoustic)	1:17
2.	"Taunt" (acoustic)	2:29
3.	"One Day" (acoustic)	2:44
4.	"Sex Sells" (acoustic)	3:41
5.	"Cause for Concern" (acoustic)	3:34
Total length:		13:45

== Release history ==
Release formats for Are You Alright?
Region	Date	Format	Label	Version	Ref.
Various	10 May 2021	Digital download; streaming	Self-released	Original	
Various	14 October 2022	LP	Anvil Cat; AWAL	Compilation with Pebble Brain	
Various	7 April 2023 (Note: As "Anvil Cat", with "Lovejoy" credited as a featuring artist.)	Digital download; streaming	Anvil Cat; AWAL	Acoustic (From Studio 4)	
United States	24 November 2023	12" EP	Anvil Cat; AWAL	Acoustic (From Studio 4)	
