= Call Me What You Like =

Call Me What You Like may refer to:

- "Call Me What You Like" (Keane song), 2000
- "Call Me What You Like" (Lovejoy song), 2023
