= Your New Boyfriend =

2020 single by Wilbur Soot

Single by Wilbur Soot
- Released: 11 December 2020
- Genre: Comedy; indie pop; indie rock
- Length: 3:59
- Songwriter: William Gold
- Producer: William Gold

Wilbur Soot singles chronology
"Internet Ruined Me" (2020)	"Your New Boyfriend" (2020)	"Soft Boy" (2022)

Music video
- "Your New Boyfriend" on YouTube

"Your New Boyfriend" is a comedy song by English singer-songwriter, YouTuber, and Twitch streamer William Gold, better known online as Wilbur Soot, released on 11 December 2020. The song connects to Gold's previous 2020 singles, "I'm in Love with an E-Girl" and "Internet Ruined Me", completing a trilogy of songs about a teenage boy who is infatuated with an e-girl being known as the "e-girl trilogy".

The song appeared at number 100 on the midweek UK chart, published by the Official Charts Company, for the week of 14 December. It officially debuted at number 83 on the UK Singles Chart on 18 December 2020, later peaking at number 65 on 8 January 2021. The song was certified gold by the Recording Industry Association of America (RIAA) on 13 May 2022 for streams and sales amounting to 500,000 units in the US.

== Background and release ==
"Your New Boyfriend" is the finale in a trilogy of songs about its focal character, Lonely Boy, being in love with an e-girl. The two prior installments in the trilogy, "I'm in Love with an E-Girl" and "Internet Ruined Me", were both in similar style to "Your New Boyfriend". The song featured background vocals from musician Chevy.

"Your New Boyfriend" was previewed in July 2020 on YouTuber and streamer TommyInnit's Twitch channel, and officially released on 11 December 2020, along with its music video. The song accumulated over 500,000 views on YouTube around two hours after its release, and soon thereafter started trending on Twitter in the United States. The song included a reference to the singer-songwriter Jason Derulo, which caused some people to jokingly claim the song as the "bisexual anthem", due to a line from Derulo's single "Get Ugly" frequently being used on TikTok in coming out videos.

== Reception ==
The single entered the midweek UK Singles Chart at position 100 on 14 December, and later officially debuted on the UK Singles Chart at number 83 in the week of 18 December. It left the chart the following week, but later reappeared at number 65 in the week of 8 January 2021. The single also appeared on the UK Independent Singles Chart, where it peaked at number 10, the UK Independent Singles Breakers Chart, where it peaked at number 2, and the UK Singles Downloads Chart, where it peaked at number 70. Due to the song's popularity, Gold appeared on Billboard's Emerging Artists Chart at number 46 in the week of 26 December 2020. Rolling Stone reported that Gold had sold 9.6 million units in the month of December, which they attributed to "Your New Boyfriend". On 13 May 2022, the song was certified gold by the Recording Industry Association of America (RIAA).

== Music video ==
The song's music video was uploaded to YouTube on the same day the song released. The video features its focal character, Lonely Boy (played by Gold), in an office environment as he sings about his displeasure with a female Twitch streamer's new boyfriend, named Jared. The video includes several references to popular culture, such as Lonely Boy's Google profile picture being of a sad male anime character. In the video, the female Twitch streamer's name appears on screen as "Pandora Braithwaite", the name of a fictional character in the Adrian Mole series of books by Sue Townsend. The video was edited together by Gold and Elodie Grenville, an English YouTuber best known for being the editor for both Gold and TommyInnit.

== Personnel ==
Credits adapted from YouTube.

- William Gold (credited as Wilbur Soot) – vocals, piano, drums, guitars, songwriter, producer, video editor
- Chevy – backing vocals
- Dmitry Lisenko – bass
- Isaac Beer – trumpets
- Elodie Grenville (credited as elodie.gif) – video editor

== Charts ==
Chart performance for "Your New Boyfriend"
Chart (2020–2021)	Peak position
Ireland (IRMA)	100
Lithuania (AGATA)	93
UK Singles (Official Charts)	65
UK Independent (Official Charts)	10

== Certifications ==
Certifications for "Your New Boyfriend"
Region	Certification	Certified units/sales
United States (RIAA)	Gold	500,000^{‡}
^{‡} Sales+streaming figures based on certification alone.
