= Normal People Things =

2023 single by English rock band Lovejoy

Single by Lovejoy
- Released: 6 October 2023
- Length: 2:44
- Label: Anvil Cat; AWAL
- Songwriter(s): Ash Kabosu; Joe Goldsmith; Mark Boardman; William Gold
- Producer(s): Aleksi Kiiskinen

Lovejoy singles chronology
| "Call Me What You Like" (2023) | "Normal People Things" (2023) | "I'll Look Good When I'm Sober" (2024) |

Music video
- "Normal People Things" on YouTube

"Normal People Things" is a song by English indie rock band Lovejoy. It was released independently through Anvil Cat Records and AWAL on 6 October 2023. The song's music video followed a day after its release on 7 October. It debuted at number 27 on the UK Singles Chart, making it Lovejoy's second top 40 and highest-charting song in the UK.

== Background ==
Frontman William Gold stated that the song is about "finding someone who ironically isn't normal and that rare connection you get where you go 'oh damn, You’re different but in a good way'".

== Music video ==
The music video was directed by Ted Nivison and filmed in Los Angeles during the band's US tour. Nivison stated that he wanted to put the band in "old awkward family portraits from the '70s-'90s. I really wanted to have most of the video be like a collection of living portrait photography, with only the final chorus being the moment in which they break out of it."

== Personnel ==
Lovejoy

- Ash Kabosu – bass guitar, writing
- Joe Goldsmith – lead guitar, writing
- Mark Boardman – drums, writing
- William Gold – lead vocals, rhythm guitar, writing

Production

- Aleksi Kiiskinen – producer
- Marina Totino – cover art

== Charts ==
Chart performance for "Normal People Things"
| Chart (2023) | Peak position |
|---|---|
| Ireland (IRMA) | 55 |
| New Zealand Hot Singles (RMNZ) | 8 |
| UK Singles (OCC) | 27 |
| UK Indie (OCC) | 9 |
