= Pebble Brain =

2021 EP by English rock band Lovejoy

EP by Lovejoy
- Released: 14 October 2021
- Recorded: August 2021
- Studio: Small Pond (Brighton)
- Genres: Indie rock; pop-punk
- Length: 23:02
- Label: Anvil Cat
- Producer: Sam Coveney

Lovejoy chronology
| Are You Alright? (2021) | Pebble Brain (2021) | Wake Up & It's Over (2023) |

Pebble Brain is the second EP by English indie rock band Lovejoy, released independently through the band's label Anvil Cat Records on 14 October 2021. With seven tracks, it is a follow-up to their debut EP Are You Alright?, issued in May 2021. It debuted at number 12 on the UK Albums Chart and held positions in ten international charts.

== Background and release ==
Lovejoy was formed in 2021 and debuted with the EP Are You Alright?, released on 8 May 2021. The same month, the band appeared on Billboard's Emerging Artists chart at number 10. All four of the EP's tracks peaked on the UK Independent Singles Chart, with "One Day" at number 5 and positions in four other international charts.

On 14 October 2021, following the release of numerous track demos online, Pebble Brain was released digitally. Frontman Wilbur Soot, real name William Gold, revealed the EP had taken over a year to complete, the EP was actually delayed due to the track "Perfume" which originally did not make the final cut. One year after its original release, the EP received its first pressing to vinyl as a compilation with Are You Alright?

== Composition ==
Critics found Pebble Brain's lyricism to concern two main themes – relationships and politics. Opening track "Oh Yeah, You Gonna Cry?" is written from the "point of view of someone watching the current relationship of a potential romantic interest come to an end", and is thematically similar to "Concrete", written about a failed relationship. Sonically, reviewers found tracks to maintain "familiar horns, exciting percussion, and similar guitar riffs", however such repetitive instrumentation made tracks "truly lack distinction from each other". Political allusions can be found in tracks "Model Buses" and "You'll Understand When You're Older", regarding then-Prime Minister Boris Johnson stating that "he makes model buses in his free time", and the impact of the COVID-19 pandemic on service workers respectively. "The Fall", written about the "wealthy upper class", stood out to reviewers for its "higher emphasis on the dark bass to the lyrical message to [Gold's] speech at the end, an awe-inspiring mix between spoken word and rap". In terms of production, the EP was criticised by some outlets for issues with mixing, with one explaining "the lead singer's voice is sometimes hard to hear over the high-energy drums and guitar".

== Reception ==
Professional ratings
Review scores
| Source | Rating |
|---|---|
| AllMusic | 3/5 stars |

The EP received generally positive reviews. Timothy Monger of AllMusic wrote Pebble Brain features "improved production value" compared to their debut, concluding "[Gold's] song subjects are sometimes as frenetic as the band's delivery, but are often quite enjoyable". A reviewer for Teen Ink found flaws in the closing track, writing "the beat was unattractive, and the song as a whole felt rushed and uninteresting", though highly praised "Perfume" as "a much easier track to appreciate the poetical essence Lovejoy crafts".

== Track listing ==
All tracks are written by Ash Kabosu, Joe Goldsmith, Mark Boardman and William Gold.

Pebble Brain track listing
| No. | Title | Length |
|---|---|---|
| 1. | "Oh Yeah, You Gonna Cry?" | 2:49 |
| 2. | "Model Buses" | 2:50 |
| 3. | "Concrete" | 3:16 |
| 4. | "Perfume" | 3:27 |
| 5. | "You'll Understand When You're Older" | 3:52 |
| 6. | "The Fall" | 3:04 |
| 7. | "It's All Futile! It's All Pointless!" | 3:40 |
| Total length: | | 23:02 |

Notes

- "It's All Futile! It's All Pointless!" is a re-recording of a track on Gold's 2019 EP, Maybe I Was Boring.

== Personnel ==
This section is adapted from Genius.

- William Gold – lead vocals, rhythm guitar, songwriter
- Joe Goldsmith – lead guitar, songwriter
- Ash Kabosu – bass, songwriter
- Mark Boardman – drums, songwriter
- Sam Coveney – producer

== Charts ==
Chart performance for Pebble Brain
| Chart (2021) | Peak position |
|---|---|
| Belgian Albums (Ultratop Flanders) | 56 |
| Canadian Albums (Billboard) | 41 |
| Dutch Albums (Album Top 100) | 35 |
| Finnish Albums (Suomen virallinen lista) | 21 |
| Irish Albums (Official Charts) | 14 |
| Lithuanian Albums (AGATA) | 3 |
| New Zealand Albums (RMNZ) | 11 |
| Norwegian Albums (VG-lista) | 32 |
| Swedish Albums (Sverigetopplistan) | 24 |
| UK Albums (Official Charts) | 12 |
| US Billboard 200 | 128 |

== Certifications ==
| Region | Certification | Certified units/sales |
|---|---|---|
| United Kingdom (BPI) | Silver | 60,000^{‡} |
^{‡} Sales+streaming figures based on certification alone.

== Release history ==
Release formats for Pebble Brain
| Region | Date | Format | Label | Ref. |
|---|---|---|---|---|
| Various | 14 October 2021 | Digital download; streaming | Anvil Cat | |
| Various | 14 October 2022 (Note: As a compilation with Lovejoy's debut EP Are You Alright?) | LP | Anvil Cat; AWAL | |
