= Wake Up & It's Over =

2023 EP by English rock band Lovejoy

EP by Lovejoy
- Released: 12 May 2023
- Recorded: 2022
- Genre: Indie rock; pop-punk
- Length: 21:29
- Label: Anvil Cat; AWAL
- Producer: Lovejoy; Mark Crew; Dan Priddy

Lovejoy chronology
Pebble Brain (2021)	Wake Up & It's Over (2023)	One Simple Trick (2025)

Singles from Wake Up & It's Over
- 1. "Call Me What You Like" Released: 10 February 2023

Wake Up & It's Over is the third EP by English indie rock band Lovejoy. It was released independently through the band's label Anvil Cat Records and AWAL on 12 May 2023. It contains six tracks, including lead single "Call Me What You Like", and is the follow-up to the band's second EP Pebble Brain, issued in October 2021. It debuted at number 5 on the UK Albums Chart and number 2 on the UK Independent Albums Charts and held positions in seven international charts.

== Background and release ==
The initials of the EP's title were first teased on social media in October 2022, then in the band's Spotify biography later in the year. On 10 February 2023, the band released the lead single "Call Me What You Like", which debuted at number 32 on the UK Singles Chart, and crossed over onto American alternative radio, peaking at number 24 on the Billboard Alternative Airplay chart.

In the lead-up to the EP's release, the band implied that demo track "It's Golden Hour Somewhere" would not be included in the final tracklist. However, the song's addition as the EP's closing track was officially revealed the day before the record's physical and digital release. Addressing the misdirection, the band's bass guitarist, Ash Kabosu, said that "we've just made up a bunch of nonsense, and they've bought into it... I think the relief and the excitement they'll feel on the day that it comes out to just see it in the tracklisting will be worth it". In September 2023, "Portrait of a Blank Slate" was revealed to be included in the soundtrack for EA Sports FC 24.

== Composition ==
The band took considerable time to write "Call Me What You Like", with frontman William Gold saying "we had the tune down for about ten months before I even penned the lyrics that ended up going in the final release". Sonically, according to Dork, opening track "Portrait of a Blank Slate" contains similarities to the sound of English rock band Arctic Monkeys, with Gold citing the band as a key influence on the EP's sound. Further, Kabosu found inspiration from indie bands Foals and Bombay Bicycle Club.

== Track listing ==
All tracks are written by Ash Kabosu, Joe Goldsmith, Mark Boardman and William Gold.

Wake Up & It's Over track listing
No.	Title	Producer(s)	Length
1.	"Portrait of a Blank Slate"	Lovejoy	3:47
2.	"Call Me What You Like"	Mark Crew; Dan Priddy	3:46
3.	"Consequences"	Crew; Priddy	3:10
4.	"Warsaw"	Lovejoy	3:30
5.	"Scum"	Lovejoy	3:52
6.	"It's Golden Hour Somewhere"	Lovejoy	3:24
Total length:			21:29

Notes

- The second track had the working titles "Hemlock" and "Awake Forever".
- The fourth track had the working title "Choke".
- On YouTube, the fifth track appears as "Scum (It Eats You Alive)". On digital and physical releases, it appears only as "Scum".

== Personnel ==
Lovejoy

- Ash Kabosu – bass guitar, writing
- Joe Goldsmith – lead guitar, background vocals, writing
- Mark Boardman – drums, writing
- William Gold – lead vocals, rhythm guitar, writing

Production

- Lovejoy (Note: It was confirmed by Kabosu in the comments of record producer Blake McLain's YouTube video reacting to this EP, that the tracks except track 2 and 3 were self-produced by the band.) – producer (tracks 1, 4–6)
- Joseph Rodgers – recording engineer (tracks 1, 4–6)
- Mark Crew – producer, recording engineer (tracks 2–3)
- Dan Priddy – producer, recording engineer (tracks 2–3)
- Rich Costey – mixing
- Giovanni Versari – mastering
- Ash Kabosu – artwork
- Marina Totino – artwork

== Charts ==
Chart performance for Wake Up & It's Over
Chart (2023)	Peak position
Australian Albums (ARIA)	27
Belgian Albums (Ultratop Flanders)	12
Belgian Albums (Ultratop Wallonia)	102
German Albums (Offizielle Top 100)	87
Irish Albums (OCC)	10
Lithuanian Albums (AGATA)	17
New Zealand Albums (RMNZ)	25
Polish Albums (ZPAV)	3
Scottish Albums (OCC)	3
UK Albums (OCC)	5
UK Independent Albums (OCC)	2
US Billboard 200	94
US Independent Albums (Billboard)	17
US Top Alternative Albums (Billboard)	8
US Top Rock Albums (Billboard)	11

== Release history ==
Release formats for Wake Up & It's Over
Region	Date	Format	Label	Ref.
Various	12 May 2023	Cassette; CD; digital download; streaming	Anvil Cat; AWAL	
