= Wilbur Soot =

English Internet personality and musician (born 1996)

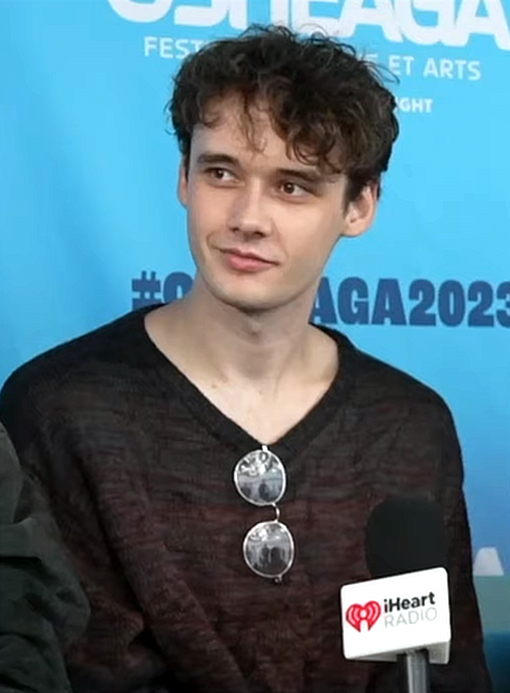
- Gold during a 2023 interview at Osheaga

Background information
- Born: William Patrick Gold (Note: Gold has stated that his name is William, but he has also stated that his birth certificate says Will. He has said that he prefers the name William, he is credited as William Patrick Gold on music platforms, and Companies House lists his legal name as William Patrick Gold. He has also once stated an additional middle name of "Spencer".); 14 September 1996 (age 30)
- Genres: Indie rock; comedy
- Occupations: Twitch streamer; YouTuber; singer-songwriter; musician
- Instruments: Vocals; guitar; piano
- Member of: Lovejoy

Twitch information
- Channel: WilburSoot
- Years active: 2017–2023
- Followers: 4.60 million

YouTube information
- Genre: Gaming
- Subscribers: 5.54 million (main channel); 8.44 million (combined) (Note: Subscribers, broken down by channel: 5.54 million (Wilbur Soot) 588 thousand (Wilbur) 15.5 thousand (SootVODS) 10.8 thousand (Wilbur Soot Extra) 100 thousand (Hey and Stuff) 17.2 thousand (Minecraft and Donuts) 15.3 thousand (ALittleBritOfWill) 12.4 thousand (WilburGold) 18.6 thousand (settings66) 1.18 million (Lovejoy) 732 thousand (Sorry) 215 thousand (Very Sorry))
- Views: 801.89 million (main channel); 996.24 million (combined) (Note: Views, broken down by channel: 801.89 million (Wilbur Soot) 18.21 million (Wilbur) 324.01 thousand (SootVODS) 263.25 thousand (Wilbur Soot Extra) 908.36 thousand (Hey and Stuff) 1.72 million (Minecraft and Donuts) 139.63 thousand (ALittleBritOfWill) 173.37 thousand (WilburGold) 341.52 thousand (settings66) 141.32 million (Lovejoy) 27.3 million (Sorry) 3.61 million (Very Sorry))
- Last updated: 31 March 2025

William Patrick Gold (born 14 September 1996), known professionally as Wilbur Soot, is an English YouTuber and musician. He first became known in 2017 for his work with the group comedy YouTube channel SootHouse, where he made recurring appearances and was the lead editor and a co-founder. He later started his own channel, Wilbur Soot, in March 2019.

Gold released his first single, "The 'Nice Guy' Ballad", in January 2018. His sixth single, "Your New Boyfriend", peaked at No. 64 on the UK singles chart. Gold is co-founder of the British indie rock band Lovejoy, where he is one of the songwriters, the lead vocalist and the rhythm guitarist. In 2021, they released Pebble Brain, their second EP, which debuted at No. 12 on the UK Albums Chart, and their third EP Wake Up & It's Over, released in 2023, debuted at No. 5 on the UK Albums Chart.

== Online career ==
=== YouTube ===
Gold first became known in 2017 for his work on the group YouTube channel, SootHouse, which was founded by Gold and some of his friends. This channel consisted mostly of reaction videos, with its members discussing memes and life hacks, among other topics. On 30 May 2019, the SootHouse channel reached 1 million subscribers.

Gold's main channel, Wilbur Soot, was created on 29 March 2019. This channel reached 1 million subscribers on 8 April 2020, and, as of October 2026, it has amassed over 5.2 million subscribers.

Gold also has another channel, "Wilbur", which is dedicated to geography. This channel was begun 23 November 2017, and as of October 2026, has 599 thousand subscribers.

=== Livestreaming ===
Gold also live streams on Twitch, where, as of June 2024, he has amassed over 4.6 million followers, making him the 51st-most-followed channel on the platform.

In 2020, Gold joined the roleplay-focused Minecraft server Dream SMP, run by eponymous YouTuber Dream. There, Gold founded the fictional nation of L'manberg and eventually became a lead writer for the server's stories and lore. Gold has competed in multiple Minecraft tournaments, including MC Championship and Minecraft Monday.

On 4 August 2022, TommyInnit announced a book he and Gold had been writing called TommyInnit Says...The Quote Book. The book was released on 13 October 2022. The proceeds from the book were donated to the Sarcoma Foundation of America in honour of late Minecraft YouTuber Technoblade.

== Musical career ==
=== Solo artist ===
In 2018, Gold began his music career by releasing comedy songs and covers on YouTube. His first comedy song, "The 'Nice Guy' Ballad", was uploaded in January 2018. Venturing into more serious music, Gold released the EP Maybe I Was Boring on SoundCloud and Bandcamp, in December 2019, composed of songs that "didn't fit the vibe" of Your City Gave Me Asthma. followed by his debut solo album, Your City Gave Me Asthma, in June 2020, as a surprise release. The album was originally supposed to release with 8 songs, however Gold scrapped the 4th track, "Screensaver", before publishing. Gold first charted with his sixth comedy song, "Your New Boyfriend", released in December 2020, which peaked on the UK Singles Chart at number 65. The song also appeared on the UK Indie Chart and the Irish Singles Chart, where it peaked at numbers 10 and 100, respectively. Gold has also appeared on several artist charts, including Billboard's Emerging Artists Chart and Rolling Stone's Top Breakthrough Chart. Gold's seventh comedy song "Soft Boy" came out in September 2022. Gold released his second solo studio album, Mammalian Sighing Reflex, in November 2023.

=== Lovejoy ===
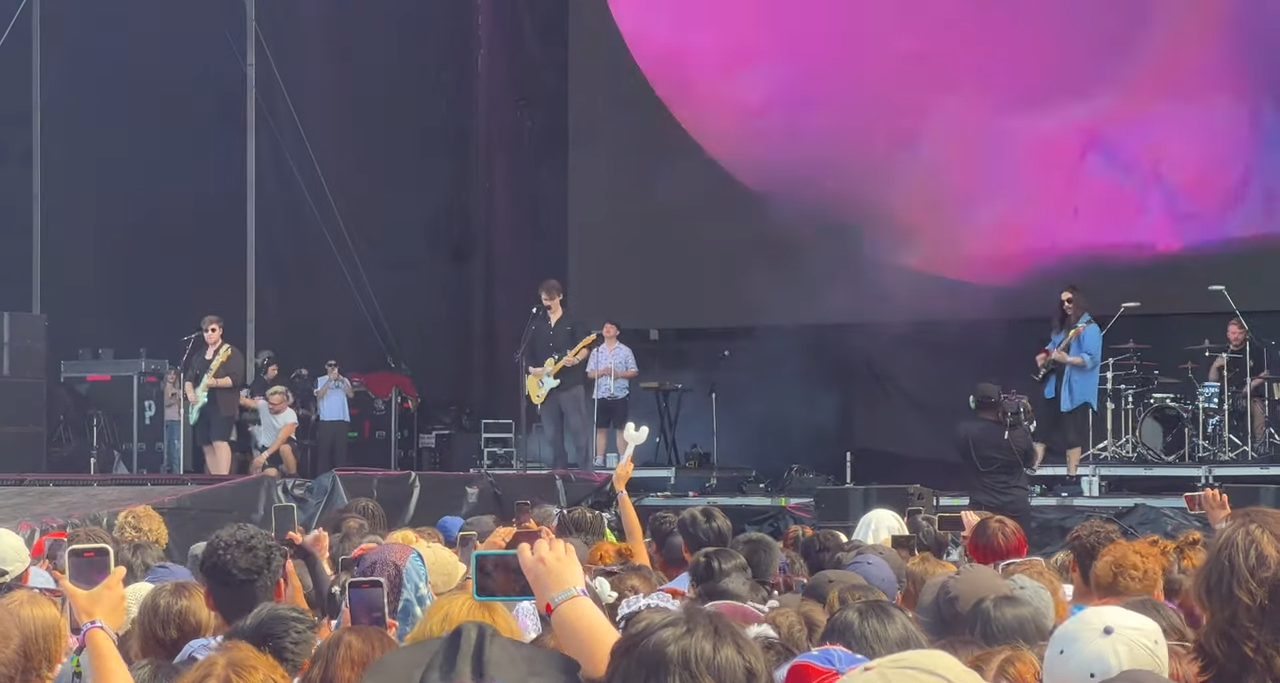
Lovejoy at Lollapalooza in 2023

Gold formed the indie rock band Lovejoy in 2021 with his friend Joe Goldsmith. The band consists of Gold as lead vocalist, co-songwriter, and rhythm guitarist; Goldsmith as the lead guitarist, co-songwriter, and backing vocalist; Mark Boardman as the drummer, and co-songwriter; and Ash Kabosu as the bassist, and co-songwriter.

On 9 May 2021, Lovejoy released their first EP, titled Are You Alright?. On 20 May 2021, they debuted on Billboard's Emerging Artists chart at number 10.Their second EP, Pebble Brain, was released on 14 October 2021, peaking at number 12 on the UK Albums Chart. The EP featured a re-recording of Gold's solo song "It's All Futile! It's All Pointless!". After joining AWAL, Lovejoy released the single "Call Me What You Like" on 10 February 2023, which peaked at number 32 on the UK Singles Chart. The band's third EP, Wake Up & It's Over, was released on 12 May 2023 and peaked at number 5 on the UK Albums Chart. The band's debut album, One Simple Trick, released on 3 October 2025.

== Discography ==
=== Albums ===
List of albums, with selected details
Title	Details	Peak chart positions
Title	Details	LTU
Your City Gave Me Asthma	Released: 25 June 2020; Formats: Digital download, streaming	31
Mammalian Sighing Reflex	Released: 29 November 2023; Formats: Digital download, streaming	45

=== Extended plays ===
List of EPs, with selected details
Title	Details
Maybe I Was Boring	Released: 25 December 2019; Formats: Digital download, streaming

=== Singles ===
List of singles, with selected details
Title	Year	Peak chart positions				Certifications	Album
Title	Year	UK	UK Indie	IRE	LTU	Certifications	Album
"The 'Nice Guy' Ballad"	2018	—	—	—	—		Non-album singles
"I Am Very Smart"	2019	—	—	—	—		Non-album singles
"Maybe I Was Boring"	2019	—	—	—	—		Maybe I Was Boring
"Karen, Please Come Back I Miss the Kids"	2019	—	—	—	—		Non-album singles
"I'm in Love with an E-Girl"	2020	—	—	—	—		Non-album singles
"Internet Ruined Me"	2020	—	—	—	—		Non-album singles
"Your New Boyfriend"	2020	65	10	100	93	RIAA: Gold; BPI: Silver; RMNZ: Gold	Non-album singles
"Soft Boy"	2022	—	—	—	—		Non-album singles

== Bibliography ==
- Simons, Tom; Gold, William (2022). TommyInnit Says...The Quote Book. Quercus Publishing. ISBN 9781529427974.

== See also ==
- List of most-followed Twitch channels
- List of YouTubers
