= List of Billboard Social 50 number-one artists =

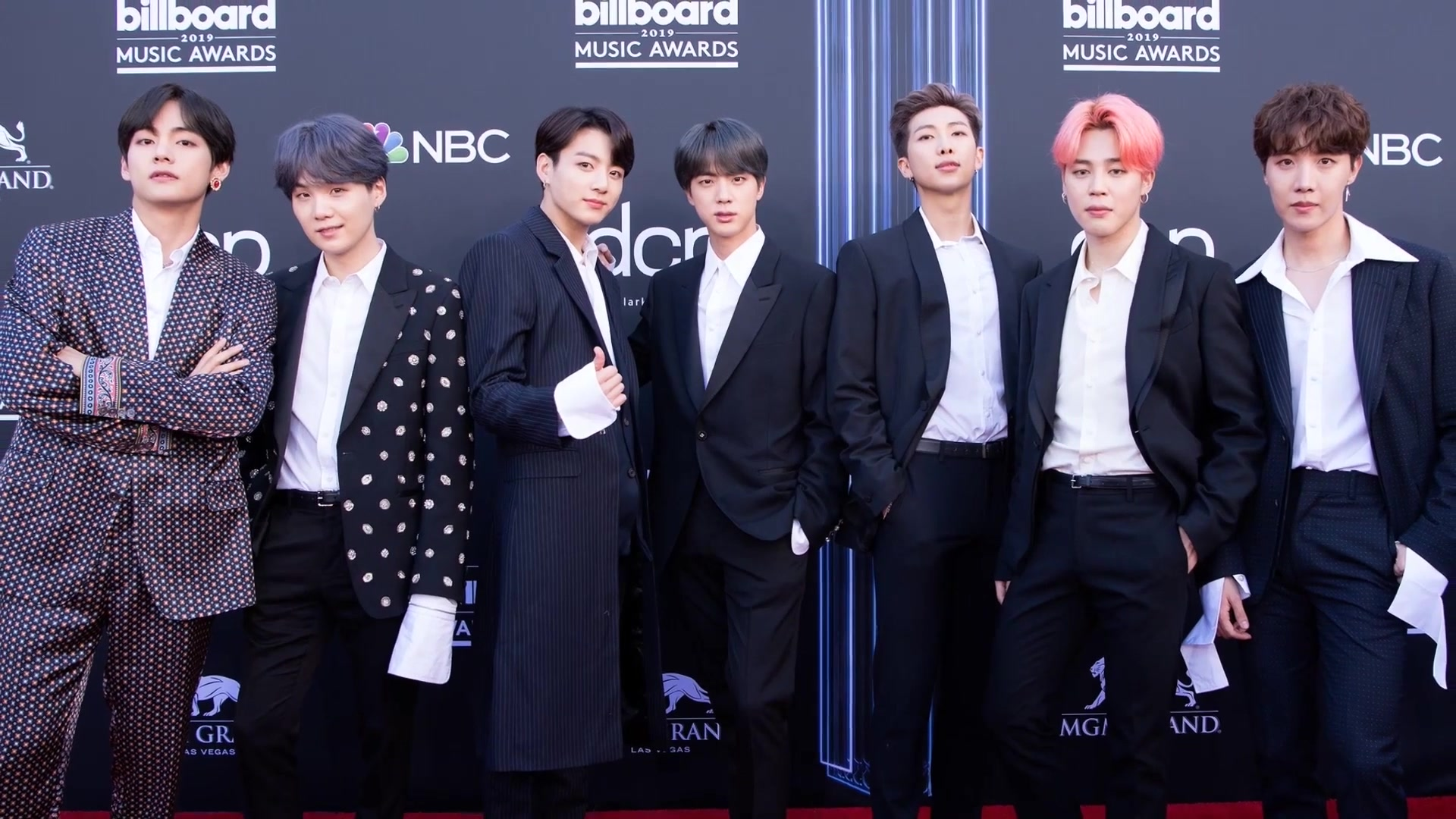
BTS have spent the most weeks as number one on the Billboard Social 50, with 210 out of their 219 weeks on the chart.

The Billboard Social 50 was a popularity chart which ranked the most active music artists on the world's leading social networking services. Its data, published by Billboard magazine and compiled by Next Big Sound, was based collectively on each artist's weekly additions of friends, fans and followers, along with artist website views and streaming media. Bill Werde, the former editorial director of Billboard, called the Social 50 "yet another step" in the evolution of the magazine and an "important response to our changing times". The chart initially only retrieved its data from YouTube, Vevo, Facebook, Twitter, Myspace, and iLike to create its ranking, but in November 2012 was expanded to include SoundCloud and Instagram. Data from Vine and Tumblr was added to the chart in June 2015.

The Billboard Social 50 was launched on December 11, 2010. The first artist to reach number one on the chart was Barbadian singer Rihanna. Since debuting, she had spent a total of 21 weeks at the top of the chart. In October 2016, South Korean boy band BTS landed the number one spot on the chart, becoming the second K-pop act, after Psy, to reach first place on the ranking. They set the record for the most weeks at number one, with 210. Canadian singer-songwriter Justin Bieber followed with 164 weeks at number one. BTS also set the record for the most consecutive weeks at number one, with 180. Following her death in December 2012, American singer Jenni Rivera became the first and only artist to top the chart posthumously. Since its launch, 20 artists had reached the top spot on the Billboard Social 50. Three of these artists—Rivera, Skrillex and Justin Timberlake—had only reached the spot for a single week.

On December 26, 2020, Billboard announced its suspension of the Social 50 chart for an undisclosed period of time in order to facilitate their transition to a new data partner. While this would also impact the Artist 100 and Emerging Artists charts—both include social metrics in their formulation—Billboard stated that neither chart would be disrupted. The Social 50 was to resume activity sometime early in 2021, but remains inactive to date.

== Number-one artists ==
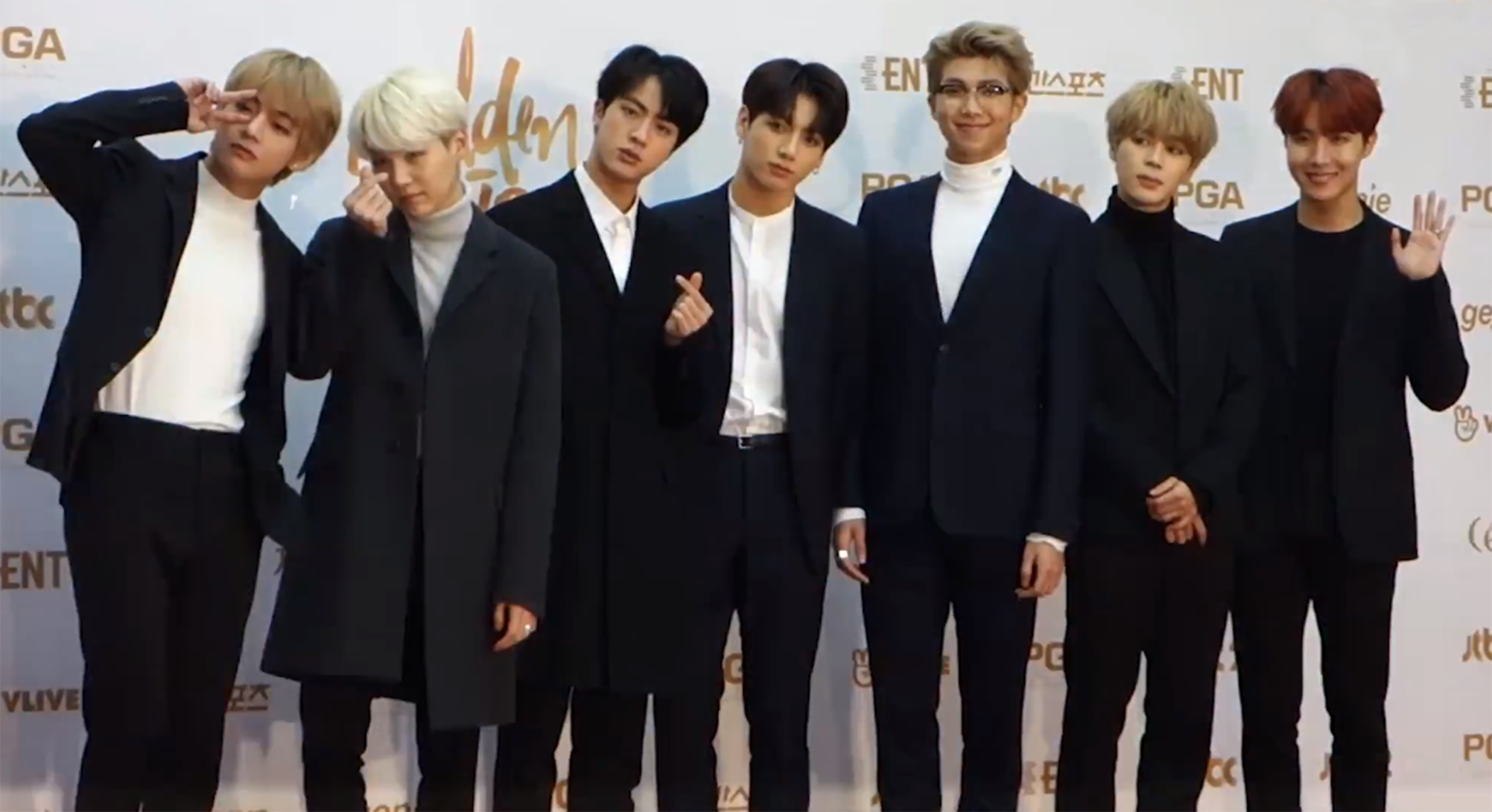
BTS currently holds the record for most consecutive weeks at number one with 180.

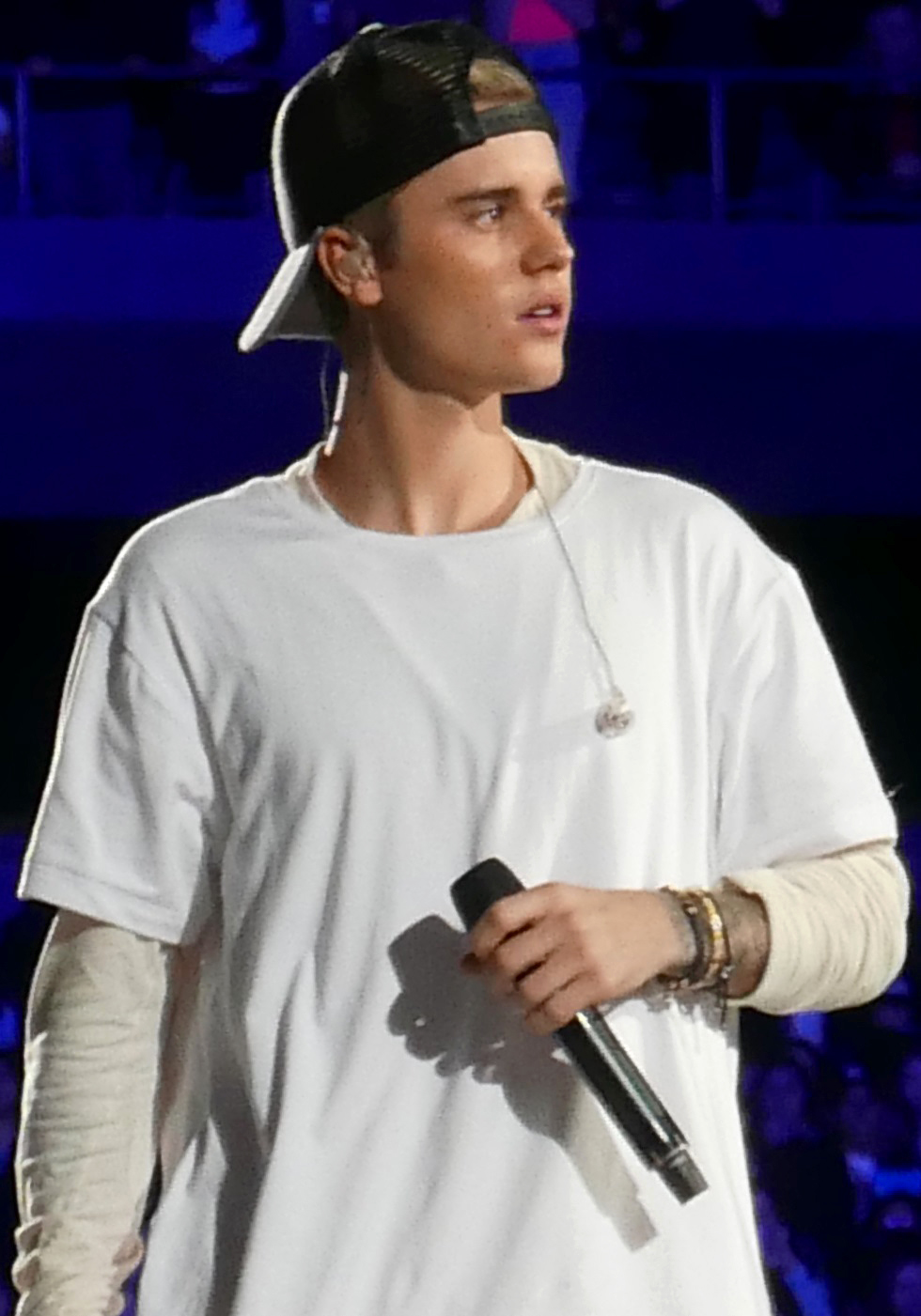
Justin Bieber has spent 163 weeks at number one on the Billboard Social 50.

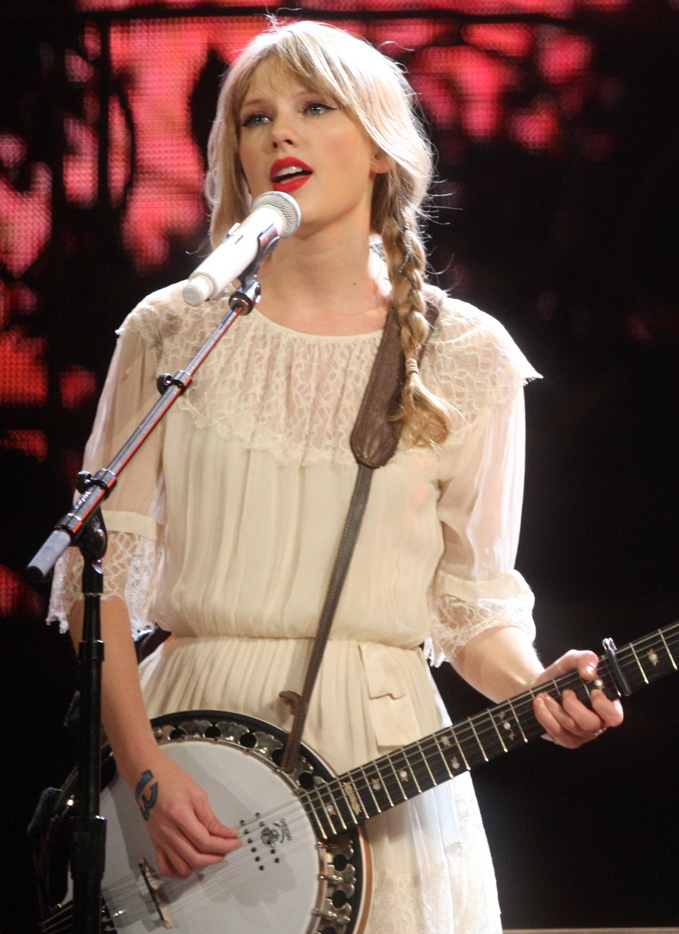
Taylor Swift have spent 28 weeks at number one, the most by any female artist.

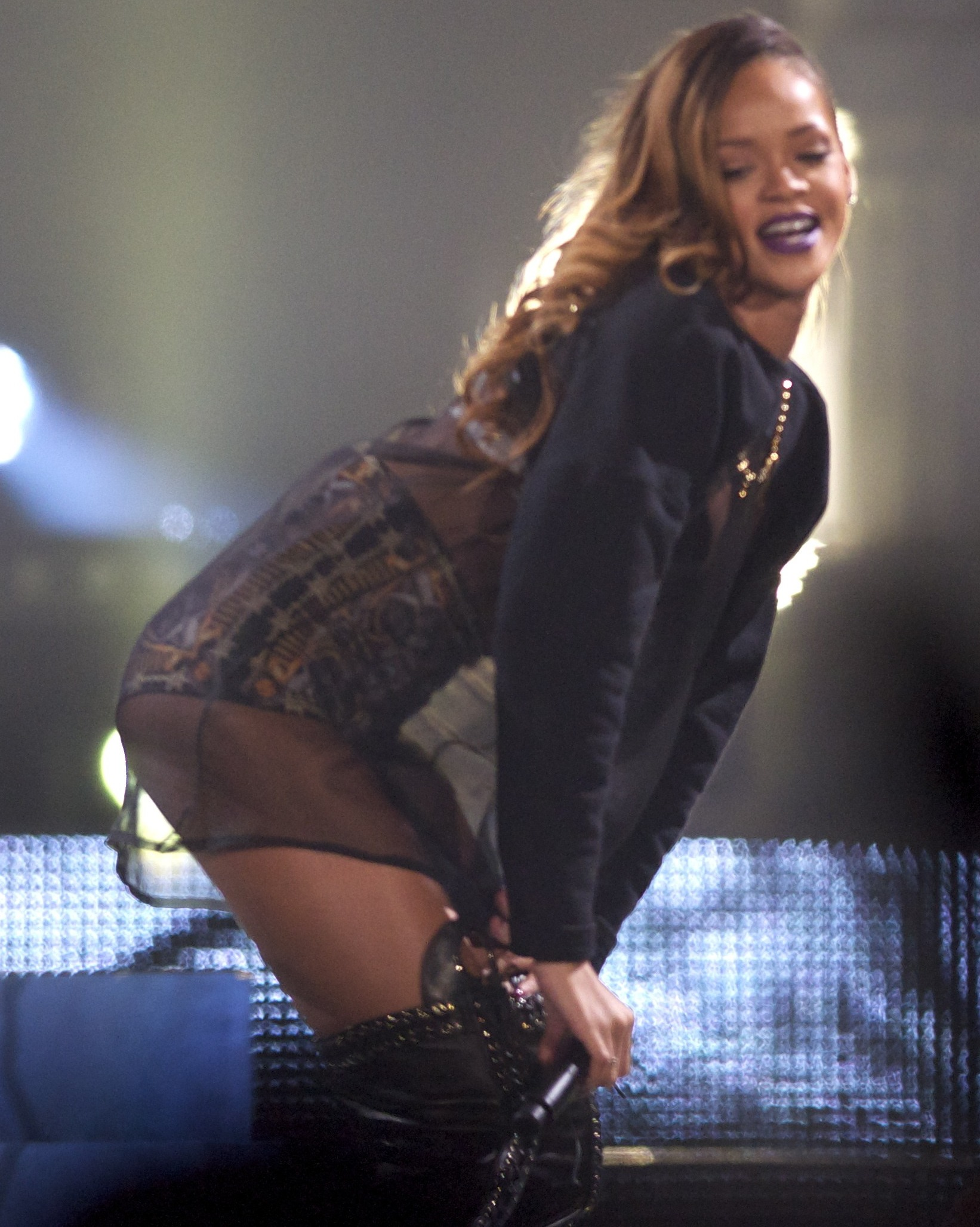
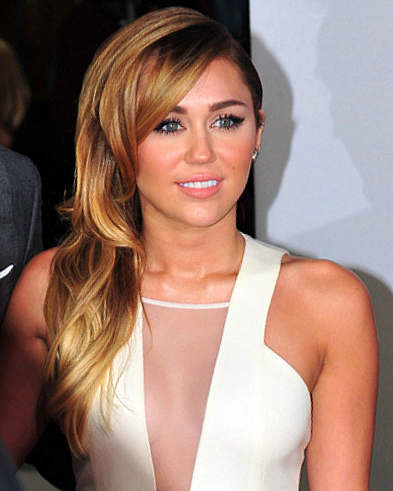
Rihanna and Miley Cyrus have each spent 21 weeks at number one on the Billboard Social 50.

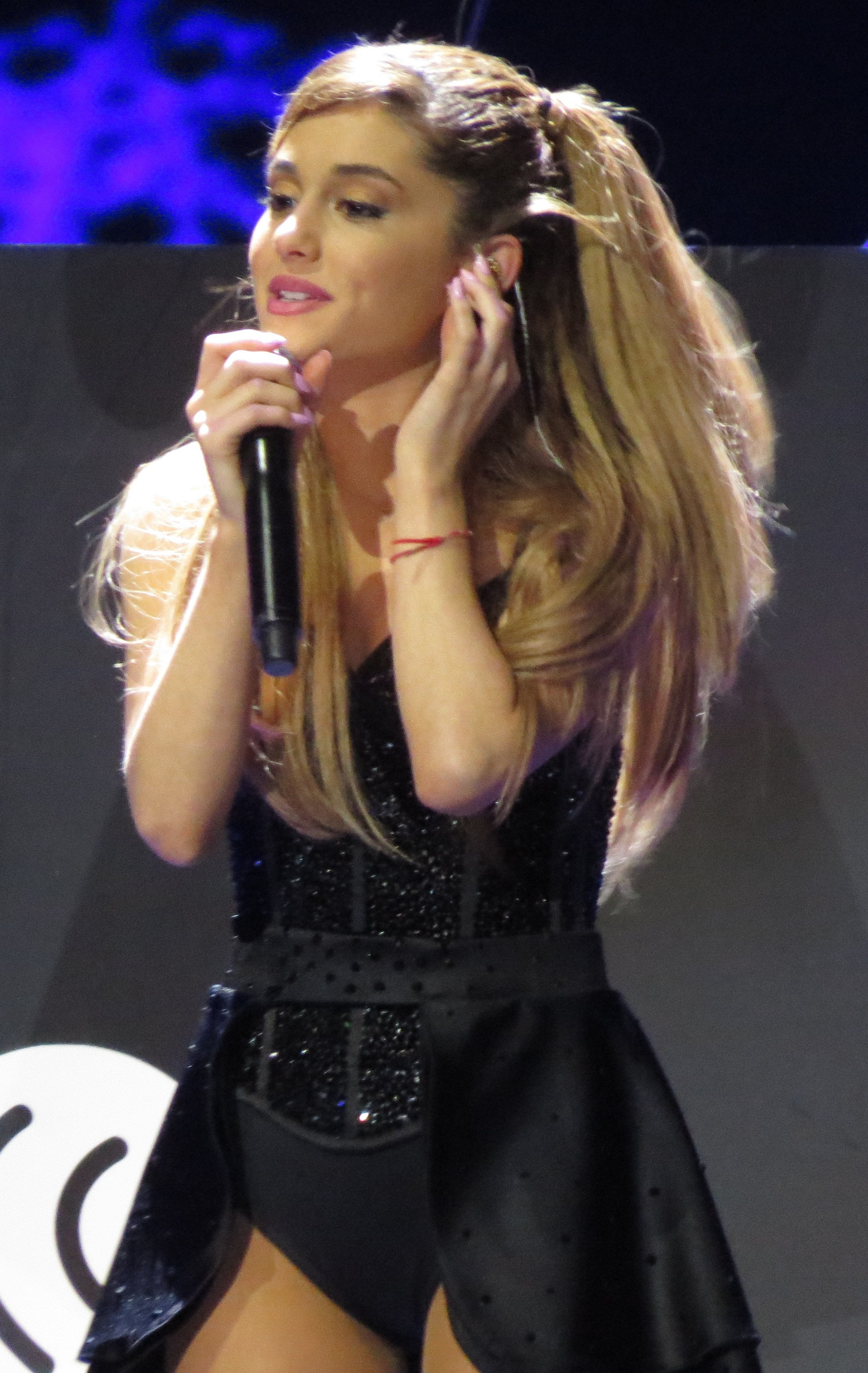
Ariana Grande has spent 18 weeks at number one on the Billboard Social 50.

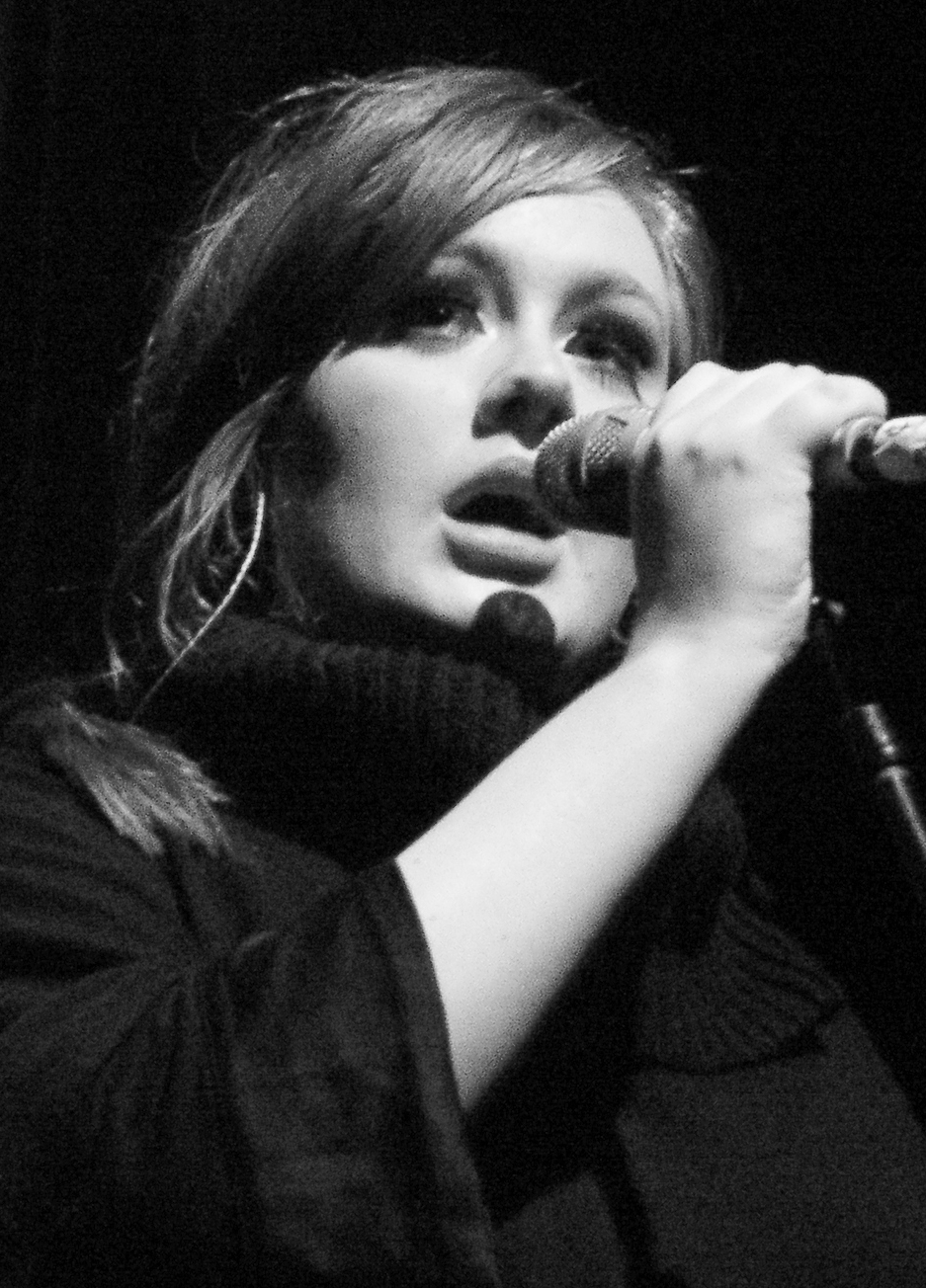
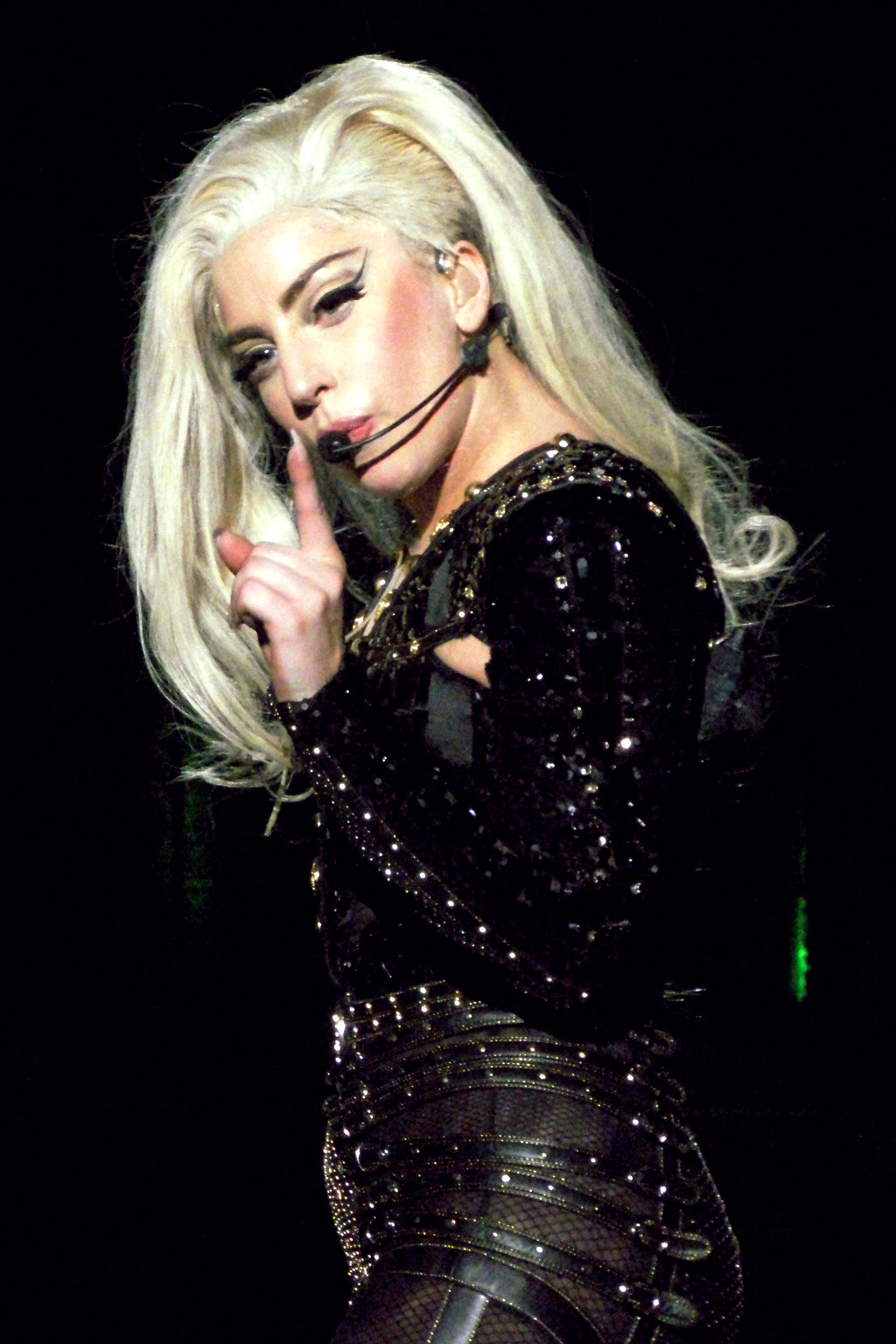
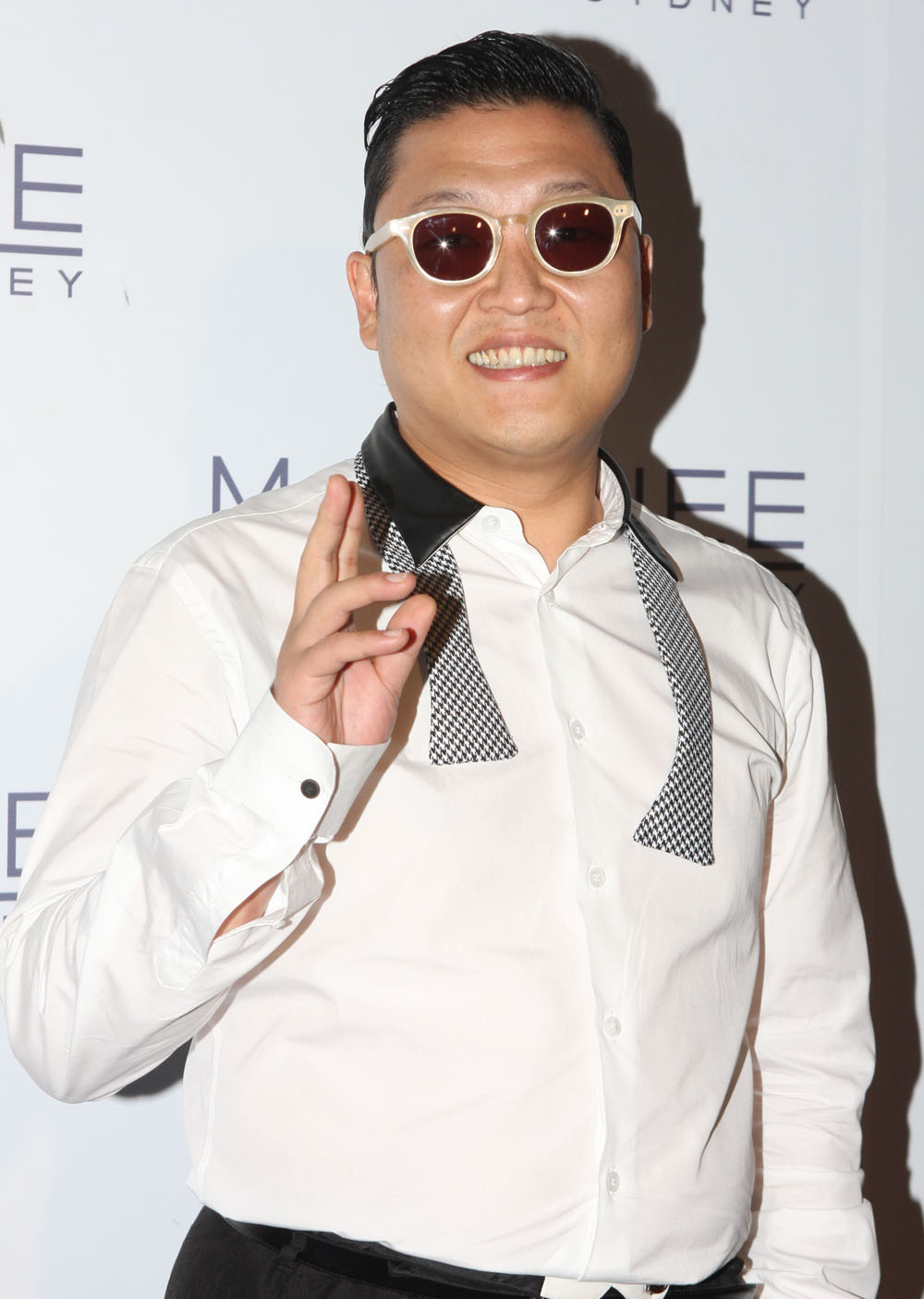
Adele, Lady Gaga, and Psy have each spent 11 weeks at number one on the Billboard Social 50.

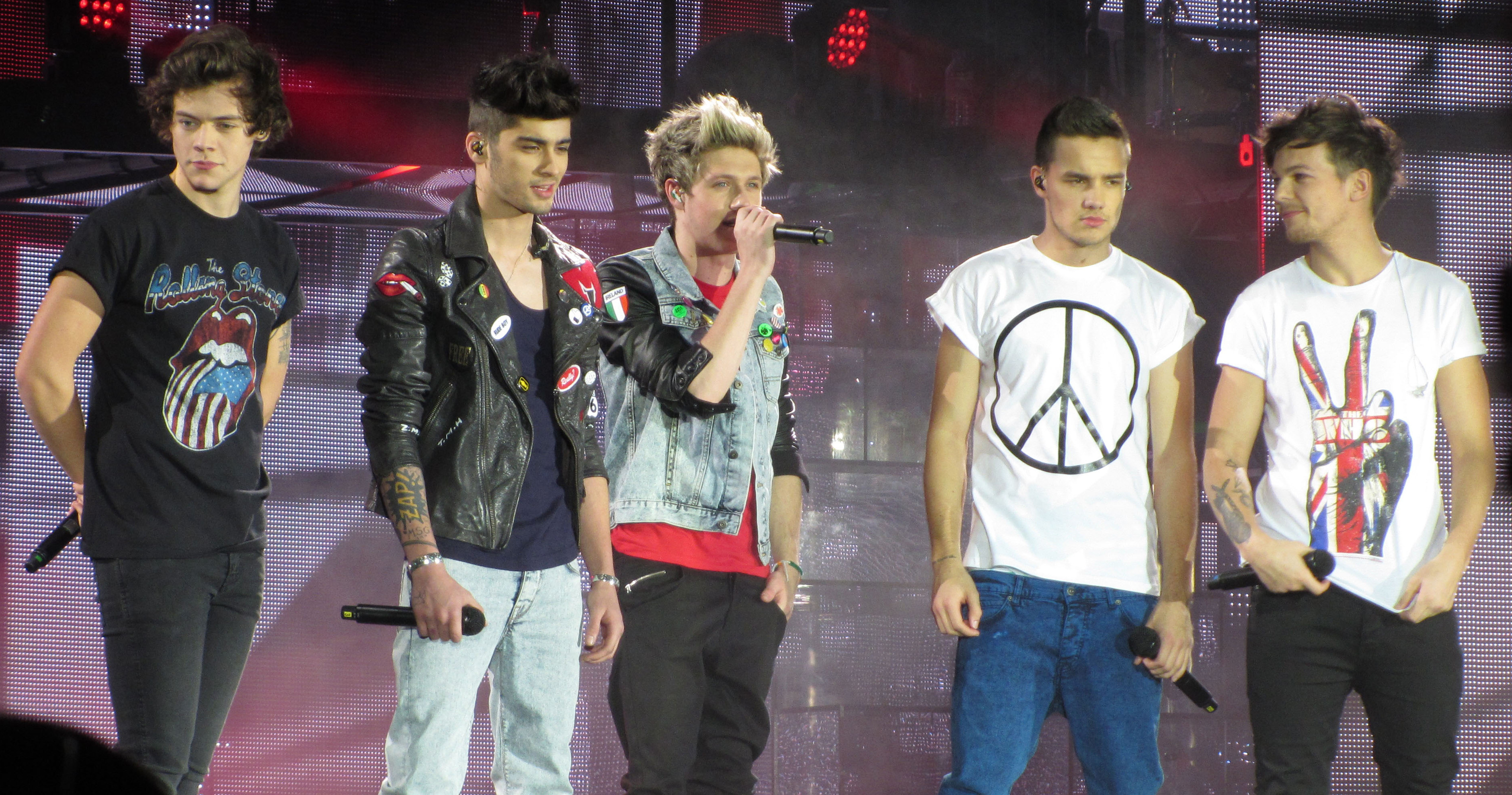
One Direction has spent 8 weeks at number one on the Billboard Social 50.

Key
No.	nth artist to top the Billboard Social 50
re	Return of an artist to number one

No.	Artist	Reached number one	Weeks at number one	Ref.
1	Rihanna	December 11, 2010	1	
2	The Black Eyed Peas	December 18, 2010	2	(Note: Billboard Social 50 (December 18–25, 2010): "Social 50". Billboard. December 18, 2010. Archived from the original on November 15, 2014.; "Social 50". Billboard. December 25, 2010. Archived from the original on December 16, 2021.)
re	Rihanna	January 1, 2011	3	(Note: Billboard Social 50 (January 1–15, 2011): "Social 50". Billboard. January 1, 2011. Archived from the original on March 24, 2015.; "Social 50". Billboard. January 8, 2011. Archived from the original on March 23, 2015.; "Social 50". Billboard. January 15, 2011. Archived from the original on March 24, 2015.)
3	Justin Bieber	January 22, 2011	4	(Note: Billboard Social 50 (January 22 – February 12, 2011): "Social 50". Billboard. January 22, 2011. Archived from the original on March 23, 2015.; "Social 50". Billboard. January 29, 2011. Archived from the original on March 23, 2015.; "Social 50". Billboard. February 5, 2011. Archived from the original on March 24, 2015.; "Social 50". Billboard. February 12, 2011. Archived from the original on March 23, 2015.)
re	Rihanna	February 19, 2011	1	
4	Lady Gaga	February 26, 2011	1	
re	Justin Bieber	March 5, 2011	2	(Note: Billboard Social 50 (March 5–12, 2011): "Social 50". Billboard. March 5, 2011. Archived from the original on March 23, 2015.; "Social 50". Billboard. March 12, 2011. Archived from the original on March 24, 2015.)
re	Lady Gaga	March 19, 2011	5	(Note: Billboard Social 50 (March 19 – April 16, 2011): "Social 50". Billboard. March 19, 2011. Archived from the original on March 23, 2015.; "Social 50". Billboard. March 26, 2011. Archived from the original on March 23, 2015.; "Social 50". Billboard. April 2, 2011. Archived from the original on March 23, 2015.; "Social 50". Billboard. April 9, 2011. Archived from the original on March 23, 2015.; "Social 50". Billboard. April 16, 2011. Archived from the original on March 24, 2015.)
re	Justin Bieber	April 23, 2011	4	(Note: Billboard Social 50 (April 23 – May 14, 2011): "Social 50". Billboard. April 23, 2011. Archived from the original on March 23, 2015.; "Social 50". Billboard. April 30, 2011. Archived from the original on March 24, 2015.; "Social 50". Billboard. May 7, 2011. Archived from the original on March 23, 2015.; "Social 50". Billboard. May 14, 2011. Archived from the original on March 23, 2015.)
re	Lady Gaga	May 21, 2011	5	(Note: Billboard Social 50 (May 21 – June 18, 2011): "Social 50". Billboard. May 21, 2011. Archived from the original on March 23, 2015.; "Social 50". Billboard. May 28, 2011. Archived from the original on March 24, 2015.; "Social 50". Billboard. June 4, 2011. Archived from the original on March 23, 2015.; "Social 50". Billboard. June 11, 2011. Archived from the original on March 23, 2015.; "Social 50". Billboard. June 18, 2011. Archived from the original on March 23, 2015.)
re	Justin Bieber	June 25, 2011	3	(Note: Billboard Social 50 (June 25 – July 9, 2011): "Social 50". Billboard. June 25, 2011. Archived from the original on March 23, 2015.; "Social 50". Billboard. July 2, 2011. Archived from the original on March 23, 2015.; "Social 50". Billboard. July 9, 2011. Archived from the original on March 24, 2015.)
5	Selena Gomez	July 16, 2011	1	
re	Justin Bieber	July 23, 2011	1	
re	Rihanna	July 30, 2011	1	
re	Justin Bieber	August 6, 2011	24	(Note: Billboard Social 50 (August 6, 2011 – January 14, 2012): "Social 50". Billboard. August 6, 2011. Archived from the original on March 23, 2015.; "Social 50". Billboard. August 13, 2011. Archived from the original on March 23, 2015.; "Social 50". Billboard. August 20, 2011. Archived from the original on March 23, 2015.; "Social 50". Billboard. August 27, 2011. Archived from the original on March 23, 2015.; "Social 50". Billboard. September 3, 2011. Archived from the original on March 23, 2015.; "Social 50". Billboard. September 10, 2011. Archived from the original on March 23, 2015.; "Social 50". Billboard. September 17, 2011. Archived from the original on March 24, 2015.; "Social 50". Billboard. September 24, 2011. Archived from the original on March 24, 2015.; "Social 50". Billboard. October 1, 2011. Archived from the original on March 23, 2015.; "Social 50". Billboard. October 8, 2011. Archived from the original on March 23, 2015.; "Social 50". Billboard. October 15, 2011. Archived from the original on March 23, 2015.; "Social 50". Billboard. October 22, 2011. Archived from the original on March 23, 2015.; "Social 50". Billboard. October 29, 2011. Archived from the original on March 23, 2015.; "Social 50". Billboard. November 5, 2011. Archived from the original on March 23, 2015.; "Social 50". Billboard. November 12, 2011. Archived from the original on March 24, 2015.; "Social 50". Billboard. November 19, 2011. Archived from the original on March 23, 2015.; "Social 50". Billboard. November 26, 2011. Archived from the original on March 24, 2015.; "Social 50". Billboard. December 3, 2011. Archived from the original on March 24, 2015.; "Social 50". Billboard. December 10, 2011. Archived from the original on March 23, 2015.; "Social 50". Billboard. December 17, 2011. Archived from the original on March 23, 2015.; "Social 50". Billboard. December 24, 2011. Archived from the original on March 24, 2015.; "Social 50". Billboard. December 31, 2011. Archived from the original on June 20, 2014.; "Social 50". Billboard. January 7, 2012. Archived from the original on March 23, 2015.; "Social 50". Billboard. January 14, 2012. Archived from the original on March 23, 2015.)
6	Adele	January 21, 2012	11	(Note: Billboard Social 50 (January 21 – March 31, 2012): "Social 50". Billboard. January 21, 2012.; "Social 50". Billboard. January 28, 2012.; "Social 50". Billboard. February 4, 2012.; "Social 50". Billboard. February 11, 2012.; "Social 50". Billboard. February 18, 2012.; "Social 50". Billboard. February 25, 2012.; "Social 50". Billboard. March 3, 2012.; "Social 50". Billboard. March 10, 2012.; "Social 50". Billboard. March 17, 2012.; "Social 50". Billboard. March 24, 2012.; "Social 50". Billboard. March 31, 2012.)
re	Rihanna	April 7, 2012	1	(Note: "Social 50". Billboard. April 7, 2012.)
re	Justin Bieber	April 14, 2012	7	(Note: Billboard Social 50 (April 14 – May 26, 2012): "Social 50". Billboard. April 14, 2012.; "Social 50". Billboard. April 21, 2012.; "Social 50". Billboard. April 28, 2012.; "Social 50". Billboard. May 5, 2012.; "Social 50". Billboard. May 12, 2012.; "Social 50". Billboard. May 19, 2012.; "Social 50". Billboard. May 26, 2012.)
re	Rihanna	June 2, 2012	5	(Note: Billboard Social 50 (June 2–30, 2012): "Social 50". Billboard. June 2, 2012.; "Social 50". Billboard. June 9, 2012.; "Social 50". Billboard. June 16, 2012.; "Social 50". Billboard. June 23, 2012.; "Social 50". Billboard. June 30, 2012.)
7	Katy Perry	July 7, 2012	1	(Note: "Social 50". Billboard. July 7, 2012.)
re	Rihanna	July 14, 2012	2	(Note: Billboard Social 50 (July 14–21, 2012): "Social 50". Billboard. July 14, 2012.; "Social 50". Billboard. July 21, 2012.)
8	Skrillex	July 28, 2012	1	(Note: "Social 50". Billboard. July 28, 2012.)
re	Rihanna	August 4, 2012	1	(Note: "Social 50". Billboard. August 4, 2012.)
re	Justin Bieber	August 11, 2012	2	(Note: Billboard Social 50 (August 11–18, 2012): "Social 50". Billboard. August 11, 2012.; "Social 50". Billboard. August 18, 2012.)
re	Rihanna	August 25, 2012	1	(Note: "Social 50". Billboard. August 25, 2012.)
9	Taylor Swift	September 1, 2012	1	(Note: "Social 50". Billboard. September 1, 2012.)
10	Psy	September 8, 2012	10	(Note: Billboard Social 50 (September 8 – November 10, 2012): "Social 50". Billboard. September 8, 2012.; "Social 50". Billboard. September 15, 2012.; "Social 50". Billboard. September 22, 2012.; "Social 50". Billboard. September 29, 2012.; "Social 50". Billboard. October 6, 2012.; "Social 50". Billboard. October 13, 2012.; "Social 50". Billboard. October 20, 2012. Archived from the original on October 26, 2013.; "Social 50". Billboard. October 27, 2012. Archived from the original on October 23, 2013.; "Social 50". Billboard. November 3, 2012. Archived from the original on October 23, 2013.; "Social 50". Billboard. November 10, 2012. Archived from the original on October 23, 2013.)
11	One Direction	November 17, 2012	1	
re	Justin Bieber	November 24, 2012	1	
re	One Direction	December 1, 2012	1	(Note: "Social 50". Billboard. December 1, 2012.)
re	Rihanna	December 8, 2012	2	(Note: Billboard Social 50 (December 8–15, 2012): "Social 50". Billboard. December 8, 2012.; "Social 50". Billboard. December 15, 2012.)
re	Justin Bieber	December 22, 2012	1	
12	Jenni Rivera	December 29, 2012	1	
re	Justin Bieber	January 5, 2013	5	(Note: Billboard Social 50 (January 5 – February 2, 2013): "Social 50". Billboard. January 5, 2013. Archived from the original on February 27, 2013.; "Social 50". Billboard. January 12, 2013. Archived from the original on February 25, 2013.; "Social 50". Billboard. January 19, 2013. Archived from the original on February 26, 2013.; "Social 50". Billboard. January 26, 2013. Archived from the original on January 28, 2013.; "Social 50". Billboard. February 2, 2013. Archived from the original on February 1, 2013.)
13	Shakira	February 9, 2013	1	
14	Beyoncé	February 16, 2013	2	(Note: Billboard Social 50 (February 16–23, 2013): "Social 50". Billboard. February 16, 2013. Archived from the original on February 17, 2013.; "Social 50". Billboard. February 23, 2013. Archived from the original on February 22, 2013.)
re	Rihanna	March 2, 2013	2	(Note: Billboard Social 50 (March 2–9, 2013): "Social 50". Billboard. March 2, 2013. Archived from the original on March 31, 2013.; "Social 50". Billboard. March 9, 2013. Archived from the original on May 11, 2013.)
re	Justin Bieber	March 16, 2013	3	(Note: Billboard Social 50 (March 16–30, 2013): "Social 50". Billboard. March 16, 2013. Archived from the original on March 15, 2013.; "Social 50". Billboard. March 23, 2013. Archived from the original on April 19, 2013.; "Social 50". Billboard. March 30, 2013. Archived from the original on April 19, 2013.)
15	Justin Timberlake	April 6, 2013	1	
re	Justin Bieber	April 13, 2013	1	
re	Taylor Swift	April 20, 2013	1	
re	Rihanna	April 27, 2013	1	
re	Psy	May 4, 2013	1	
re	Justin Bieber	May 11, 2013	8	(Note: Billboard Social 50 (May 13 – June 29, 2013): "Social 50". Billboard. May 11, 2013. Archived from the original on May 6, 2013.; "Social 50". Billboard. May 18, 2013. Archived from the original on May 9, 2013.; "Social 50". Billboard. May 25, 2013. Archived from the original on June 7, 2013.; "Social 50". Billboard. June 1, 2013. Archived from the original on June 7, 2013.; "Social 50". Billboard. June 8, 2013. Archived from the original on June 16, 2013.; "Social 50". Billboard. June 15, 2013. Archived from the original on June 16, 2013.; "Social 50". Billboard. June 22, 2013. Archived from the original on July 12, 2013.; "Social 50". Billboard. June 29, 2013. Archived from the original on July 12, 2013.)
re	One Direction	July 6, 2013	1	
re	Justin Bieber	July 13, 2013	4	(Note: Billboard Social 50 (July 13 – August 3, 2013): "Social 50". Billboard. July 13, 2013. Archived from the original on July 12, 2013.; "Social 50". Billboard. July 20, 2013. Archived from the original on July 14, 2013.; "Social 50". Billboard. July 27, 2013. Archived from the original on July 25, 2013.; "Social 50". Billboard. August 3, 2013. Archived from the original on July 28, 2013.)
re	One Direction	August 10, 2013	2	(Note: Billboard Social 50 (August 10–17, 2013): "Social 50". Billboard. August 10, 2013. Archived from the original on August 3, 2013.; "Social 50". Billboard. August 17, 2013. Archived from the original on August 10, 2013.)
re	Justin Bieber	August 24, 2013	1	
re	One Direction	August 31, 2013	3	(Note: Billboard Social 50 (August 31 – September 14, 2013): "Social 50". Billboard. August 31, 2013. Archived from the original on August 30, 2013.; "Social 50". Billboard. September 7, 2013. Archived from the original on September 21, 2013.; "Social 50". Billboard. September 14, 2013. Archived from the original on September 21, 2013.)
re	Katy Perry	September 21, 2013	1	
16	Miley Cyrus	September 28, 2013	6	(Note: Billboard Social 50 (September 28 – November 2, 2013): "Social 50". Billboard. September 28, 2013. Archived from the original on September 21, 2013.; "Social 50". Billboard. October 5, 2013. Archived from the original on September 28, 2013.; "Social 50". Billboard. October 12, 2013. Archived from the original on October 8, 2013.; "Social 50". Billboard. October 19, 2013. Archived from the original on October 13, 2013.; "Social 50". Billboard. October 26, 2013. Archived from the original on October 19, 2013.; "Social 50". Billboard. November 2, 2013. Archived from the original on October 27, 2013.)
re	Katy Perry	November 9, 2013	1	
re	Miley Cyrus	November 16, 2013	6	(Note: Billboard Social 50 (November 16 – December 21, 2013): "Social 50". Billboard. November 16, 2013. Archived from the original on November 11, 2013.; "Social 50". Billboard. November 23, 2013. Archived from the original on November 16, 2013.; "Social 50". Billboard. November 30, 2013. Archived from the original on November 28, 2013.; "Social 50". Billboard. December 7, 2013. Archived from the original on November 30, 2013.; "Social 50". Billboard. December 14, 2013. Archived from the original on December 8, 2013.; "Social 50". Billboard. December 21, 2013. Archived from the original on December 27, 2013.)
re	Beyoncé	December 28, 2013	1	
re	Justin Bieber	January 4, 2014	1	
re	Miley Cyrus	January 11, 2014	4	(Note: Billboard Social 50 (January 11 – February 1, 2014): "Social 50". Billboard. January 11, 2014. Archived from the original on January 5, 2014.; "Social 50". Billboard. January 18, 2014. Archived from the original on January 24, 2014.; "Social 50". Billboard. January 18, 2014. Archived from the original on January 24, 2014.; "Social 50". Billboard. February 1, 2014. Archived from the original on January 25, 2014.)
re	Shakira	February 8, 2014	6	(Note: Billboard Social 50 (February 8 – March 15, 2014): "Social 50". Billboard. February 8, 2014. Archived from the original on February 14, 2014.; "Social 50". Billboard. February 15, 2014. Archived from the original on February 14, 2014.; "Social 50". Billboard. February 22, 2014. Archived from the original on February 14, 2014.; "Social 50". Billboard. March 1, 2014. Archived from the original on February 28, 2014.; "Social 50". Billboard. March 8, 2014. Archived from the original on March 3, 2014.; "Social 50". Billboard. March 15, 2014. Archived from the original on March 10, 2014.)
re	Justin Bieber	March 22, 2014	17	(Note: Billboard Social 50 (March 22 – July 12, 2014): "Social 50". Billboard. March 22, 2014. Archived from the original on March 16, 2014.; "Social 50". Billboard. March 29, 2014. Archived from the original on March 23, 2014.; "Social 50". Billboard. April 5, 2014. Archived from the original on March 29, 2014.; "Social 50". Billboard. April 12, 2014. Archived from the original on April 5, 2014.; "Social 50". Billboard. April 19, 2014. Archived from the original on April 12, 2014.; "Social 50". Billboard. April 26, 2014. Archived from the original on April 19, 2014.; "Social 50". Billboard. May 3, 2014. Archived from the original on April 26, 2014.; "Social 50". Billboard. May 10, 2014. Archived from the original on May 10, 2014.; "Social 50". Billboard. May 17, 2014. Archived from the original on May 17, 2014.; "Social 50". Billboard. May 24, 2014. Archived from the original on May 24, 2014.; "Social 50". Billboard. May 31, 2014. Archived from the original on May 31, 2014.; "Social 50". Billboard. June 7, 2014. Archived from the original on June 16, 2014.; "Social 50". Billboard. June 14, 2014. Archived from the original on June 14, 2014.; "Social 50". Billboard. June 21, 2014. Archived from the original on June 22, 2014.; "Social 50". Billboard. June 28, 2014. Archived from the original on June 28, 2014.; "Social 50". Billboard. July 5, 2014. Archived from the original on July 1, 2014.; "Social 50". Billboard. July 12, 2014. Archived from the original on July 13, 2014.)
re	Miley Cyrus	July 19, 2014	1	
re	Justin Bieber	July 26, 2014	8	(Note: Billboard Social 50 (July 26 – September 13, 2014): "Social 50". Billboard. July 26, 2014. Archived from the original on July 20, 2014.; "Social 50". Billboard. August 2, 2014. Archived from the original on August 3, 2014.; "Social 50". Billboard. August 9, 2014. Archived from the original on August 8, 2014.; "Social 50". Billboard. August 16, 2014. Archived from the original on August 10, 2014.; "Social 50". Billboard. August 23, 2014. Archived from the original on August 28, 2014.; "Social 50". Billboard. August 30, 2014. Archived from the original on September 1, 2014.; "Social 50". Billboard. September 6, 2014. Archived from the original on September 6, 2014.; "Social 50". Billboard. September 13, 2014. Archived from the original on September 6, 2014.)
re	Miley Cyrus	September 20, 2014	1	
re	Justin Bieber	September 27, 2014	2	(Note: Billboard Social 50 (September 27 – October 4, 2014): "Social 50". Billboard. September 27, 2014. Archived from the original on October 7, 2014.; "Social 50". Billboard. October 4, 2014. Archived from the original on October 7, 2014.)
re	Miley Cyrus	October 11, 2014	3	(Note: Billboard Social 50 (October 11 – October 25, 2014): "Social 50". Billboard. October 11, 2014. Archived from the original on October 9, 2014.; "Social 50". Billboard. October 18, 2014. Archived from the original on October 27, 2014.; "Social 50". Billboard. October 25, 2014. Archived from the original on October 31, 2014.)
re	Justin Bieber	November 1, 2014	1	
re	Selena Gomez	November 8, 2014	1	
re	Justin Bieber	November 15, 2014	1	
17	Ariana Grande	November 22, 2014	1	
re	Justin Bieber	November 29, 2014	1	
re	Ariana Grande	December 6, 2014	3	(Note: Billboard Social 50 (December 6 – December 20, 2014): "Social 50". Billboard. December 6, 2014. Archived from the original on December 28, 2014.; "Social 50". Billboard. December 13, 2014. Archived from the original on December 27, 2014.; "Social 50". Billboard. December 20, 2014. Archived from the original on December 27, 2014.)
re	Taylor Swift	December 27, 2014	8	(Note: Billboard Social 50 (December 27, 2014 – February 14, 2015): "Social 50". Billboard. December 27, 2014. Archived from the original on March 24, 2015.; "Social 50". Billboard. January 3, 2015. Archived from the original on January 28, 2018.; "Social 50". Billboard. January 10, 2015. Archived from the original on January 28, 2018.; "Social 50". Billboard. January 17, 2015. Archived from the original on February 7, 2015.; "Social 50". Billboard. January 24, 2015. Archived from the original on January 24, 2015.; "Social 50". Billboard. January 31, 2015. Archived from the original on January 31, 2015.; "Social 50". Billboard. February 7, 2015. Archived from the original on April 10, 2015.; "Social 50". Billboard. February 14, 2015. Archived from the original on April 15, 2015.)
re	Ariana Grande	February 21, 2015	1	
re	Taylor Swift	February 28, 2015	9	(Note: Billboard Social 50 (February 28 – April 25, 2015): "Social 50". Billboard. February 28, 2015. Archived from the original on April 15, 2015.; "Social 50". Billboard. March 6, 2015. Archived from the original on January 28, 2018.; "Social 50". Billboard. March 14, 2015. Archived from the original on April 15, 2015.; "Social 50". Billboard. March 21, 2015. Archived from the original on April 15, 2015.; "Social 50". Billboard. March 28, 2015. Archived from the original on April 6, 2015.; "Social 50". Billboard. April 4, 2015. Archived from the original on April 5, 2015.; "Social 50". Billboard. April 11, 2015. Archived from the original on April 12, 2015.; "Social 50". Billboard. April 18, 2015. Archived from the original on April 18, 2015.; "Social 50". Billboard. April 25, 2015. Archived from the original on April 27, 2015.)
re	Ariana Grande	May 2, 2015	1	
re	Taylor Swift	May 9, 2015	6	(Note: Billboard Social 50 (May 9 – June 13, 2015): "Social 50". Billboard. May 9, 2015. Archived from the original on May 9, 2015.; "Social 50". Billboard. May 16, 2015. Archived from the original on May 15, 2015.; "Social 50". Billboard. May 23, 2015. Archived from the original on May 22, 2015.; "Social 50". Billboard. May 30, 2015. Archived from the original on May 31, 2015.; "Social 50". Billboard. June 6, 2015. Archived from the original on August 6, 2015.; "Social 50". Billboard. June 13, 2015. Archived from the original on June 12, 2015.)
re	Ariana Grande	June 20, 2015	1	
re	Taylor Swift	June 27, 2015	1	
re	Justin Bieber	July 4, 2015	1	
re	Taylor Swift	July 11, 2015	2	(Note: Billboard Social 50 (July 11 – July 18, 2015): "Social 50". Billboard. July 11, 2015. Archived from the original on July 11, 2015.; "Social 50". Billboard. July 18, 2015. Archived from the original on July 18, 2015.)
re	Justin Bieber	July 25, 2015	56	(Note: Billboard Social 50 (July 25 – August 13, 2016): "Social 50". Billboard. July 25, 2015. Archived from the original on July 15, 2015.; "Social 50". Billboard. August 1, 2015. Archived from the original on July 22, 2015.; "Social 50". Billboard. August 8, 2015. Archived from the original on July 30, 2015.; "Social 50". Billboard. August 15, 2015. Archived from the original on August 15, 2015.; "Social 50". Billboard. August 22, 2015. Archived from the original on August 12, 2015.; "Social 50". Billboard. August 29, 2015. Archived from the original on August 21, 2015.; "Social 50". Billboard. September 5, 2015. Archived from the original on August 26, 2015.; "Social 50". Billboard. September 12, 2015. Archived from the original on September 2, 2015.; "Social 50". Billboard. September 19, 2015. Archived from the original on September 11, 2015.; "Social 50". Billboard. September 26, 2015. Archived from the original on September 18, 2015.; "Social 50". Billboard. October 3, 2015. Archived from the original on September 25, 2015.; "Social 50". Billboard. October 10, 2015. Archived from the original on October 2, 2015.; "Social 50". Billboard. October 17, 2015. Archived from the original on October 7, 2015.; "Social 50". Billboard. October 24, 2015. Archived from the original on October 14, 2015.; "Social 50". Billboard. October 31, 2015. Archived from the original on October 21, 2015.; "Social 50". Billboard. November 7, 2015. Archived from the original on October 31, 2015.; "Social 50". Billboard. November 14, 2015. Archived from the original on November 4, 2015.; "Social 50". Billboard. November 21, 2015. Archived from the original on November 12, 2015.; "Social 50". Billboard. November 28, 2015. Archived from the original on November 18, 2015.; "Social 50". Billboard. December 5, 2015. Archived from the original on November 25, 2015.; "Social 50". Billboard. December 12, 2015. Archived from the original on December 8, 2015.; "Social 50". Billboard. December 19, 2015. Archived from the original on December 10, 2015.; "Social 50". Billboard. December 26, 2015. Archived from the original on December 19, 2015.; "Social 50". Billboard. January 2, 2016. Archived from the original on December 25, 2015.; "Social 50". Billboard. January 9, 2016. Archived from the original on January 8, 2016.; "Social 50". Billboard. January 16, 2016. Archived from the original on January 15, 2016.; "Social 50". Billboard. January 23, 2016. Archived from the original on January 20, 2016.; "Social 50". Billboard. January 30, 2016. Archived from the original on August 17, 2016.; "Social 50". Billboard. February 6, 2016. Archived from the original on February 19, 2016.; "Social 50". Billboard. February 13, 2016. Archived from the original on February 27, 2016.; "Social 50". Billboard. February 20, 2016. Archived from the original on February 25, 2016.; "Social 50". Billboard. February 27, 2016. Archived from the original on February 26, 2016.; "Social 50". Billboard. March 5, 2016. Archived from the original on March 5, 2016.; "Social 50". Billboard. March 12, 2016. Archived from the original on April 15, 2016.; "Social 50". Billboard. March 19, 2016. Archived from the original on July 2, 2016.; "Social 50". Billboard. March 26, 2016. Archived from the original on May 3, 2016.; "Social 50". Billboard. April 2, 2016. Archived from the original on June 15, 2016.; "Social 50". Billboard. April 9, 2016. Archived from the original on May 11, 2016.; "Social 50". Billboard. April 16, 2016. Archived from the original on June 24, 2016.; "Social 50". Billboard. April 23, 2016. Archived from the original on July 31, 2016.; "Social 50". Billboard. April 30, 2016. Archived from the original on August 4, 2016.; "Social 50". Billboard. May 7, 2016. Archived from the original on August 9, 2016.; "Social 50". Billboard. May 14, 2016. Archived from the original on May 22, 2016.; "Social 50". Billboard. May 21, 2016. Archived from the original on August 17, 2016.; "Social 50". Billboard. May 28, 2016. Archived from the original on August 17, 2016.; "Social 50". Billboard. June 4, 2016. Archived from the original on August 17, 2016.; "Social 50". Billboard. June 11, 2016. Archived from the original on August 17, 2016.; "Social 50". Billboard. June 18, 2016. Archived from the original on June 22, 2016.; "Social 50". Billboard. June 25, 2016. Archived from the original on August 17, 2016.; "Social 50". Billboard. July 2, 2016. Archived from the original on August 9, 2016.; "Social 50". Billboard. July 9, 2016. Archived from the original on August 17, 2016.; "Social 50". Billboard. July 16, 2016. Archived from the original on August 17, 2016.; "Social 50". Billboard. July 23, 2016. Archived from the original on July 27, 2016.; "Social 50". Billboard. July 26, 2016. Archived from the original on August 10, 2016.; "Social 50". Billboard. July 26, 2016. Archived from the original on August 11, 2016.; "Social 50". Billboard. August 2, 2016. Archived from the original on August 17, 2016.)
re	Ariana Grande	August 20, 2016	1	
re	Justin Bieber	August 27, 2016	1	
re	Ariana Grande	September 3, 2016	4	
18	Shawn Mendes	October 1, 2016	2	
19	Niall Horan	October 15, 2016	2	
20	BTS	October 29, 2016	2	
re	Ariana Grande	November 12, 2016	2	
re	BTS	November 26, 2016	1	
re	Ariana Grande	December 3, 2016	1	
re	BTS	December 10, 2016	3	
re	Ariana Grande	December 31, 2016	1	
re	BTS	January 7, 2017	3	
re	Ariana Grande	January 28, 2017	1	
re	BTS	February 4, 2017	8	
re	Justin Bieber	April 1, 2017	1	
re	BTS	April 8, 2017	11	
re	Ariana Grande	June 24, 2017	1	
re	BTS	July 1, 2017	1	
re	Justin Bieber	July 8, 2017	1	
re	BTS	July 15, 2017	1	
re	Justin Bieber	July 22, 2017	1	
re	BTS	July 29, 2017	180	

== See also ==
- 2010 in music
- 2011 in music
- 2012 in music
- 2013 in music
- 2014 in music
- 2015 in music
- 2016 in music
- 2017 in music
- 2018 in music
- 2019 in music
- 2020 in music
