= Call Me What You Like (Lovejoy song) =

2023 single by English rock band Lovejoy

Single by Lovejoy

from the EP Wake Up & It's Over
- Released: 10 February 2023
- Recorded: 2022
- Genre: Indie rock
- Length: 3:46
- Label: Anvil Cat; AWAL
- Songwriters: Ash Kabosu; Joe Goldsmith; Mark Boardman; William Gold
- Producers: Mark Crew; Dan Priddy

Lovejoy singles chronology
"Knee Deep at ATP" (2021)	"Call Me What You Like" (2023)	"Normal People Things" (2023)

Music video
- "Call Me What You Like" on YouTube

"Call Me What You Like" is a song by English indie rock band Lovejoy. It was released independently through Anvil Cat Records and AWAL on 10 February 2023, as the lead single from their third EP, Wake Up & It's Over, which was released on 12 May 2023. It is their first original song since 2021. It became the band's first single to reach the top 40 in the UK Singles Chart, debuting at number 32 on the UK Singles Chart.

== Background and composition ==
Notably "heavier than their previous album" with a "bass line that thrums viciously", the song was described by Sima Shakeri of the Toronto Star as "an upbeat self-deprecating tune about the anxiety and desperation of an uneven relationship". A press release called the song a "punchy lament about a confusing relationship". Frontman William Gold stated upon its release:

It's about the phase in any kind of relationship that isn't a relationship yet, where you're not sure of the 'what are we?' That idea that you want it to be more than just a fling but you're struggling with the commitment.

Gold's vocals switch "between honeyed crooning and frenetic monologuing" throughout the track. Dave Brooks of Billboard noted the song "demonstrates how much progress the group has made", citing their "surprise hooks, lyrical bridges and stop-on-a-dime change-ups" in helping find the band's voice. The writer praised the frontman's approach to songwriting, continuing "he refuses to melt into a floor puddle with a kitschy breakup song". Upon the release of the full Wake Up & It's Over EP, Gold stated that it took a while for the lyrics to "Call Me What You Like" to be written, saying:

I think that was our longest-ever lyric writing time; we had the tune down for about ten months before I even penned the lyrics that ended up going in the final release.

Bassist Ash Kabosu said the song was originally called "Hemlock", being written "about drinking poison (metaphorically)" and having "very different verses". Frontman and lead singer William Gold stated the song was also referred to by the working title "Awake Forever".

In 2023 the band recorded a Simlish cover of the song that was featured in the Horse Ranch expansion pack for The Sims 4.

== Music video ==
A music video was premiered on YouTube alongside the song's release on 10 February. It was directed by Gold and bass guitarist Ash Kabosu. Online publication The Honey Pop praised the video for encapsulating the song's meaning, starting "with a seemingly normal plane ride" before it "escalates into utter chaos".

== Personnel ==
Lovejoy

- Ash Kabosu – bass guitar, writing
- Joe Goldsmith – lead guitar, writing
- Mark Boardman – drums, writing
- William Gold – lead vocals, rhythm guitar, writing

Production

- Mark Crew – producer
- Dan Priddy – producer
- Rich Costey – mixing
- Giovanni Versari – mastering
- Marina Totino – cover art

== Charts ==
=== Weekly charts ===
Weekly chart performance for "Call Me What You Like"
Chart (2023)	Peak position
Australia Digital Tracks (ARIA)	41
Canada Rock (Billboard)	49
Ireland (IRMA)	48
Lithuania (AGATA)	90
New Zealand Hot Singles (RMNZ)	5
UK Singles (Official Charts)	32
UK Indie (Official Charts)	7
US Hot Rock & Alternative Songs (Billboard)	25
US Rock Airplay (Billboard)	14

=== Year-end charts ===
Year-end chart performance for "Call Me What You Like"
Chart (2023)	Position
US Rock Airplay (Billboard)	39

== Release history ==
Release formats for "Call Me What You Like"
Region	Date	Format	Label	Ref.
Various	10 February 2023	Digital download; streaming	Anvil Cat; AWAL	
