= Emerging Artists =

Chart published weekly by Billboard

The Emerging Artists is a music chart released weekly by Billboard magazine listing the most popular developing music artists. The chart uses the same formula as the all-encompassing Billboard Artist 100, which measures artist activity across multiple Billboard charts, including the Billboard Hot 100 and the Billboard 200. However, the Emerging Artists chart excludes acts that have notched a top 25 entry on either the Billboard Hot 100 or Billboard 200, as well as artists that have achieved two or more top ten entries on Billboard's "Hot" song genre charts or "Top" album genre rankings.

Prior to the chart creation, Billboard had published several charts tracking emerging artists such as the Heatseekers, the Next Big Sound, and the Uncharted. Billboard launched the Emerging Artists chart in June 2014, in partnership with Twitter. It initially compiled the most-shared songs by up-and-coming artists, ranked by the volume of shares on Twitter in the United States over a seven-day period. The chart was revamped using the same formula as the Billboard Artist 100 chart in September 2017.

== Earlier charts for emerging artists ==
=== Heatseekers charts (1991–2025) ===
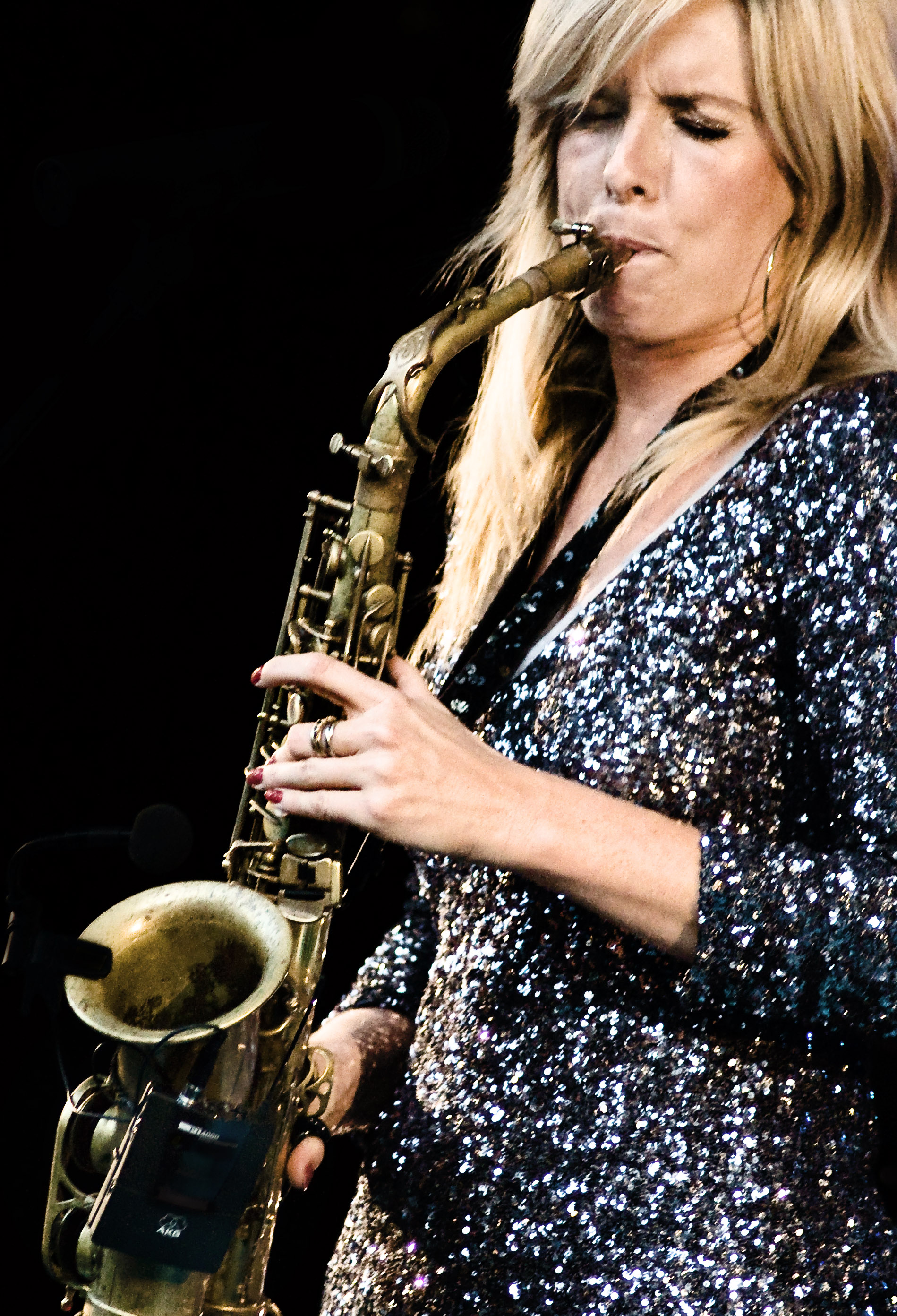
Candy Dulfer was the first emerging artist to top the Heatseekers chart.

Billboard began highlighting the performances of new and developing music artists since 1991 with the creation of the Heatseekers Albums and the Heatseekers Songs charts. A number of artists who charted on the Heatseekers chart have achieved mainstream success, such as Toby Keith who topped the Heatseekers Albums with his self-titled debut album in 1993 and topped the US main album chart of the Billboard 200 for the first time with his seven studio album Unleashed in 2002. Billie Eilish topped the Heatseekers Albums with her debut EP Don't Smile at Me (2017) and topped the Billboard 200 with her debut studio album When We All Fall Asleep, Where Do We Go? (2019).

=== Next Big Sound (2010–2021) ===
In 2010, Billboard collaborated with Next Big Sound, a New York–based company which provides analytics for online music, to create the Next Big Sound 25 chart. It listed the fastest-accelerating artists of the week, across all major social music sites, statistically predicted to achieve future success. The chart aimed to predict artists who were most likely to make their debut on the Billboard 200 chart within the next year, all based on a patented algorithm that looked at artists' growth on social media and streaming over the previous 90 days. As Pandora acquired Next Big Sound on May 19, 2015, the chart was also published on Pandora website as the "Pandora Predictions" chart. The first number-one artist on the chart was Victorious on December 18, 2010, and the final number-one artist was Yebba on October 2, 2021. The chart became permanently defunct as Pandora shut down Next Big Sound platform on November 1, 2021.

=== Uncharted (2011–2014) ===
Uncharted was a chart compiled by Billboard listing the top new and developing artists who have yet to appear on a major Billboard chart, regardless of country of origin. Ranking is based on a formula incorporating streamed plays, page views and fans according to MySpace, as well as sources tracked by online aggregator Next Big Sound, including YouTube, Facebook, Twitter, Last.fm, iLike and Wikipedia, among others. In order to appear on Uncharted, acts must be registered MySpace Music artists and have not appeared on specifically outlined Billboard charts.

The first number-one artist on the chart was Traphik on January 29, 2011, and the final number-one artist was Kygo on June 7, 2014. The top-performing Uncharted artists of the year were Traphik (2011) and DJ Bl3nd (2012 and 2013). DJ Bl3nd holds the record for the most weeks at number one on the Uncharted (62 weeks) and remained on the chart for a total of 103 weeks.

== Twitter-based methodology (2014–2017) ==
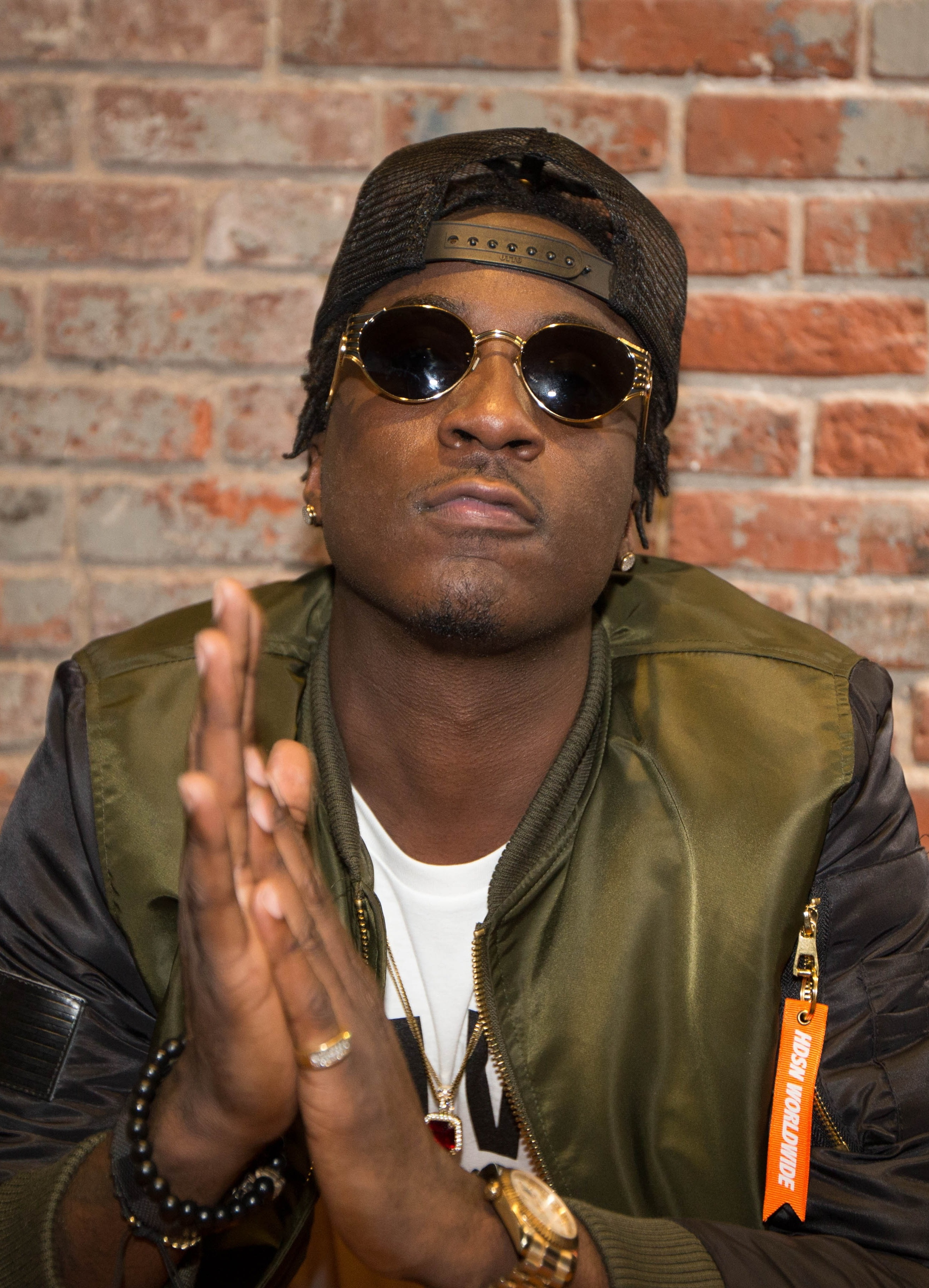
K Camp was the first artist to top the Billboard Twitter Emerging Artists chart.

The Emerging Artists was one of four Twitter charts launched by Billboard. The chart listed the most-shared songs on Twitter in the United States by up-and-coming artists—determined by Twitter follower thresholds and Hot 100 charting history—ranked by the volume of shares over a seven-day period (Monday to Sunday). Its first number one was K Camp's "Cut Her Off" on the issue dated June 7, 2014, and its final number-one before the chart revamp was Cheat Codes' "No Promises" on the issue dated August 26, 2017.

== Revised methodology (2017–present) ==
Starting with Billboard charts dated September 2, 2017, a revamped Emerging Artists chart was modeled after the same formula as the Billboard Artist 100 chart which debuted in 2014 and captures the breakout artists not on that chart. It measures artist activity across Billboard's "most influential charts", including the Billboard Hot 100, the Billboard 200 and the Social 50. And, unlike the original Billboard Twitter Emerging Artists chart, which ranked with song titles of the weekly most shared songs on Twitter by new artists, the new Emerging Artists chart ranks only by artist, without listing a song or album.

The new chart "incorporates key metrics of music consumption, blending album and track sales, radio airplay, streaming and social media fan interaction to provide a weekly multi-dimensional ranking of artist popularity". And the revised chart will "exclude artists that have notched a top 25 entry on either the Hot 100 or Billboard 200, as well as artists that have achieved two or more top 10s on Billboard's "Hot" song genre charts that blend streaming, airplay and sales data (such as the Hot Country Songs, the Hot Rock Songs, the Hot R&B/Hip-Hop Songs, and the Hot Latin Songs) or consumption-based "Top" album genre rankings (including counterpart charts the Top Country Albums, the Top Rock Albums, the Top R&B/Hip-Hop Albums, and the Top Latin Albums)". Portugal. The Man became the first number-one artist on the revamped Emerging Artists chart on the issue dated September 2, 2017.

== Achievements and milestones ==
=== Most weeks at number one ===
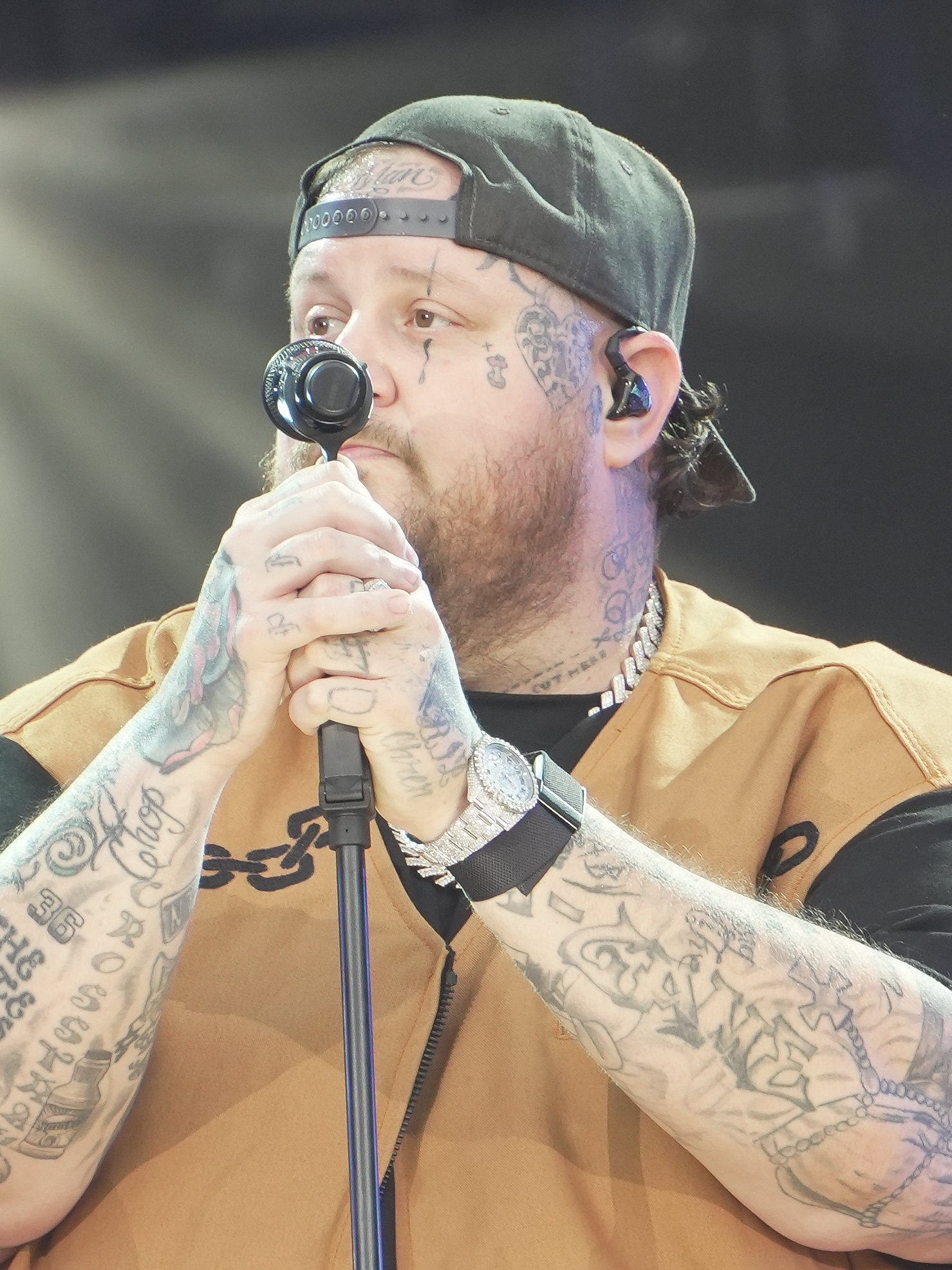
Jelly Roll spent the most weeks at number one on the Emerging Artists chart.

Top 10 artists with the most weeks at number one on the Emerging Artists
Total weeks at No. 1	Artist	First week at No. 1	Ref.
28	Jelly Roll	August 20, 2022	
24	NLE Choppa	August 3, 2019	
14	Lauv	June 9, 2018	
12	City Girls	April 6	

=== Number-one artists on the Artist 100 ===
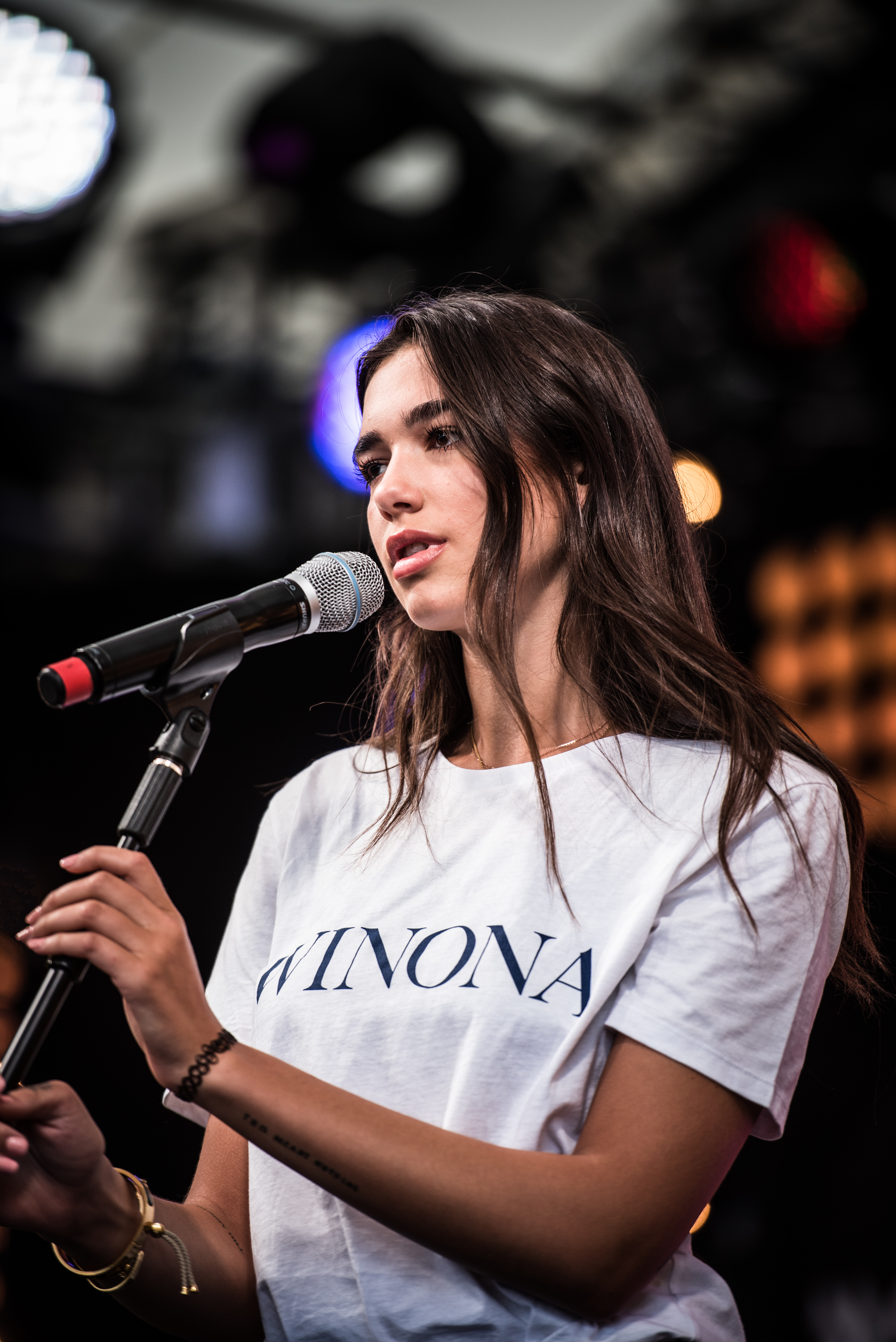
Dua Lipa reached the summit of the Artist 100 chart 191 weeks after first topping the Emerging Artists.

The following artists topped the Emerging Artists and eventually managed to score a mainstream success by topping the Billboard Artist 100 chart.

Artists topping the Emerging Artists and Artist 100 charts
Artist	First week at No. 1 on the Emerging Artists	First week at No. 1 on the Artist 100	Timespan	Ref.
Dua Lipa	September 23, 2017	May 22, 2021	191 weeks	
Lil Baby	May 26, 2018	March 14, 2020	94 weeks	
Blackpink	June 30, 2018	October 17, 2020	120 weeks	
Billie Eilish	August 4, 2018	April 13, 2019	36 weeks	
Tomorrow X Together	March 16, 2019	February 11, 2023	204 weeks	
Tate McRae	January 16, 2021	March 8, 2025	216 weeks	
ATEEZ	September 25, 2021	November 30, 2024	166 weeks	
Jelly Roll	August 20, 2022	October 26, 2024	114 weeks	
Zach Bryan	May 7, 2022	September 9, 2023	70 weeks	
Jimin	April 1, 2023	April 8, 2023	1 week	
Chappell Roan	May 18, 2024	October 5, 2024	20 weeks	
Ella Langley	November 2, 2024	April 25, 2026	77 weeks	

=== Award-winning new artists ===
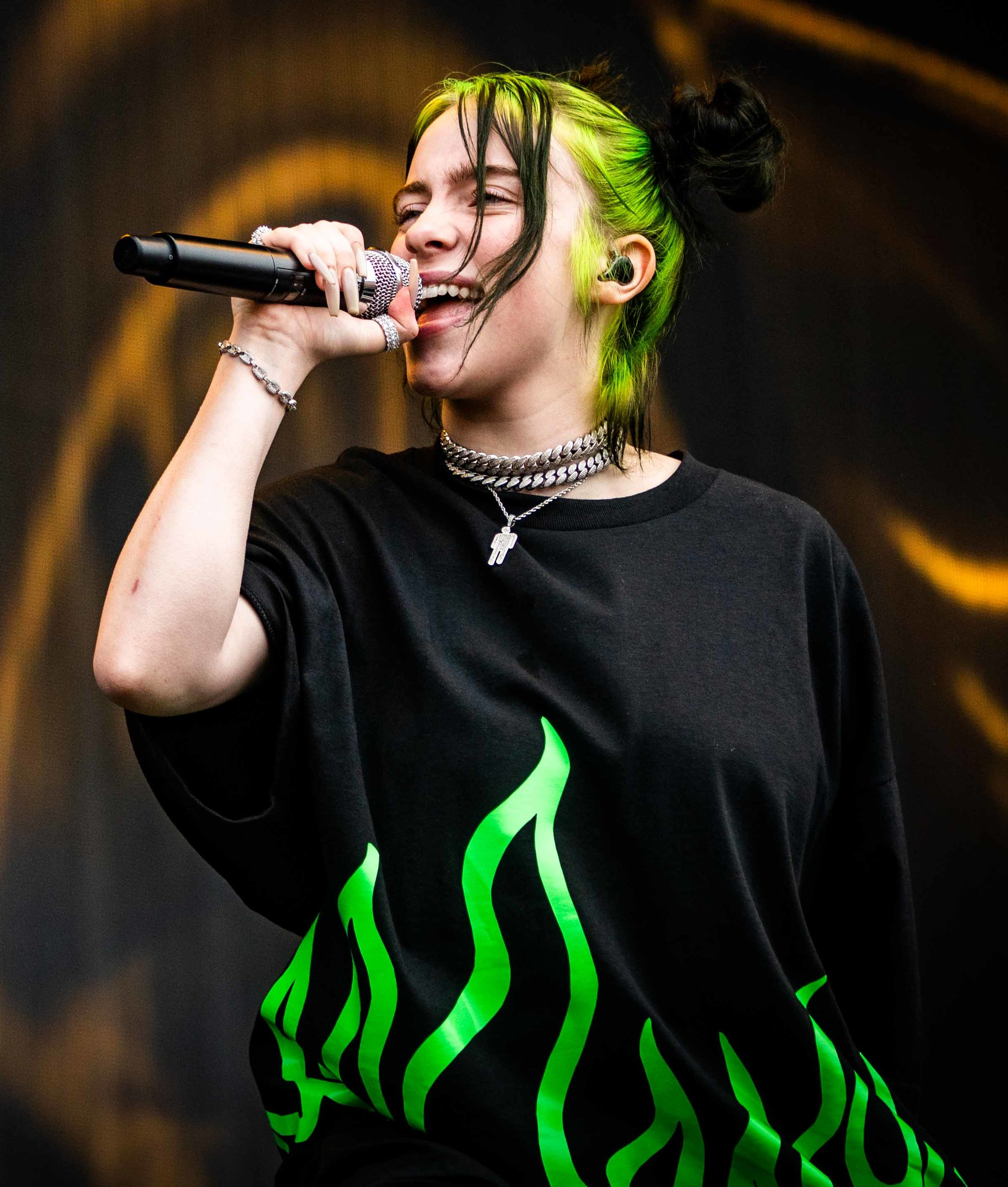
After topping the Emerging Artists in 2017, Billie Eilish won the New Artist category at both the Grammy Awards and the Billboard Awards in 2020.

Charting artists who later won the Grammy or the Billboard Music Award for New Artist category
Artist	Emerging Artists peak date	Peak position	Grammy Best New Artist	Billboard Top New Artist	Ref.
Dua Lipa	September 23, 2017	1	Won (2019)	Nominated (2019)	
Juice Wrld	May 26, 2018	3	—N/a	Won (2019)	
Billie Eilish	August 4, 2018	1	Won (2020)	Won (2020)	
Megan Thee Stallion	May 18, 2019	6	Won (2021)	—N/a	
Pop Smoke	January 11, 2020	16	—N/a	Won (2021)	
Olivia Rodrigo	January 18, 2020	11	Won (2022)	Won (2022)	
Zach Bryan	May 7, 2022	1	—N/a	Won (2023)	
Victoria Monét	February 17, 2024	1	Won (2024)	—N/a	
Chappell Roan	May 18, 2024	1	Won (2025)	Won (2024)	
