= Minecraft Monday =

Minecraft esports competition

- Game: Minecraft
- First season: June 24, 2019 (Week 1)
- Folded: October 7, 2019 (Week 14; event canceled partway through)
- Administrator: Keemstar
- Organizing body: UMG Gaming
- Competitors: 2 per team
- Most titles: Technoblade (4 wins)
- Sponsors: G Fuel; Apex Hosting

Minecraft Monday was a weekly esports tournament for the sandbox video game Minecraft. It was created by the internet personality Keemstar, known for his content on social media drama and the host of the tournament Fortnite Fridays, upon repeated suggestions from meme YouTuber Grandayy. The event featured online creators, invited based upon their popularity rather than gameplay skill, in teams of two, competing to score the most points across a series of minigames of various genres. The winning team was awarded $10,000 USD. The tournament debuted on June 24, 2019, and ended after its server was breached during the 14th event on October 7, 2019.

Minecraft Monday was credited with drawing renewed attention to Minecraft for its roster of popular creators, which included Fortnite player Ninja, YouTuber PewDiePie, and makeup vlogger James Charles, but caused community conflict due to the mixture of experienced and inexperienced Minecraft players. The cast allowed one player, Technoblade, to gain recognition in the Minecraft community after winning 4 out of the 14 events, and placing as the best-scoring individual in 7 of them. Despite social media updates by Keemstar throughout 2020 regarding a revival, the tournament did not return after its hacking. It inspired another Minecraft tournament, MC Championship, by YouTuber Smajor1995 and the group Noxcrew.

== Format ==
Minecraft Monday was a competitive tournament in Minecraft, a sandbox video game developed by Mojang Studios. Players were divided into teams of two and would compete to score the highest points. Although the first two events only featured the player versus player (PvP) battle royale mode Hunger Games, later events introduced various other minigames to test different skillsets. The revised gamelist, which changed each week, included modes such as Bingo and Capture the Flag. The event was hosted weekly on Mondays and was broadcast live by its players, most often to Twitch; the event's host, UMG Gaming, also livestreamed the events. $10,000 USD, sponsored by the gaming drink mix G Fuel, and later also the Minecraft server host Apex Hosting, was awarded to both the winning team and a random viewer. During the event's lifetime, the organizers also hosted a public Minecraft server under the IP mcmondays.com.

== History ==
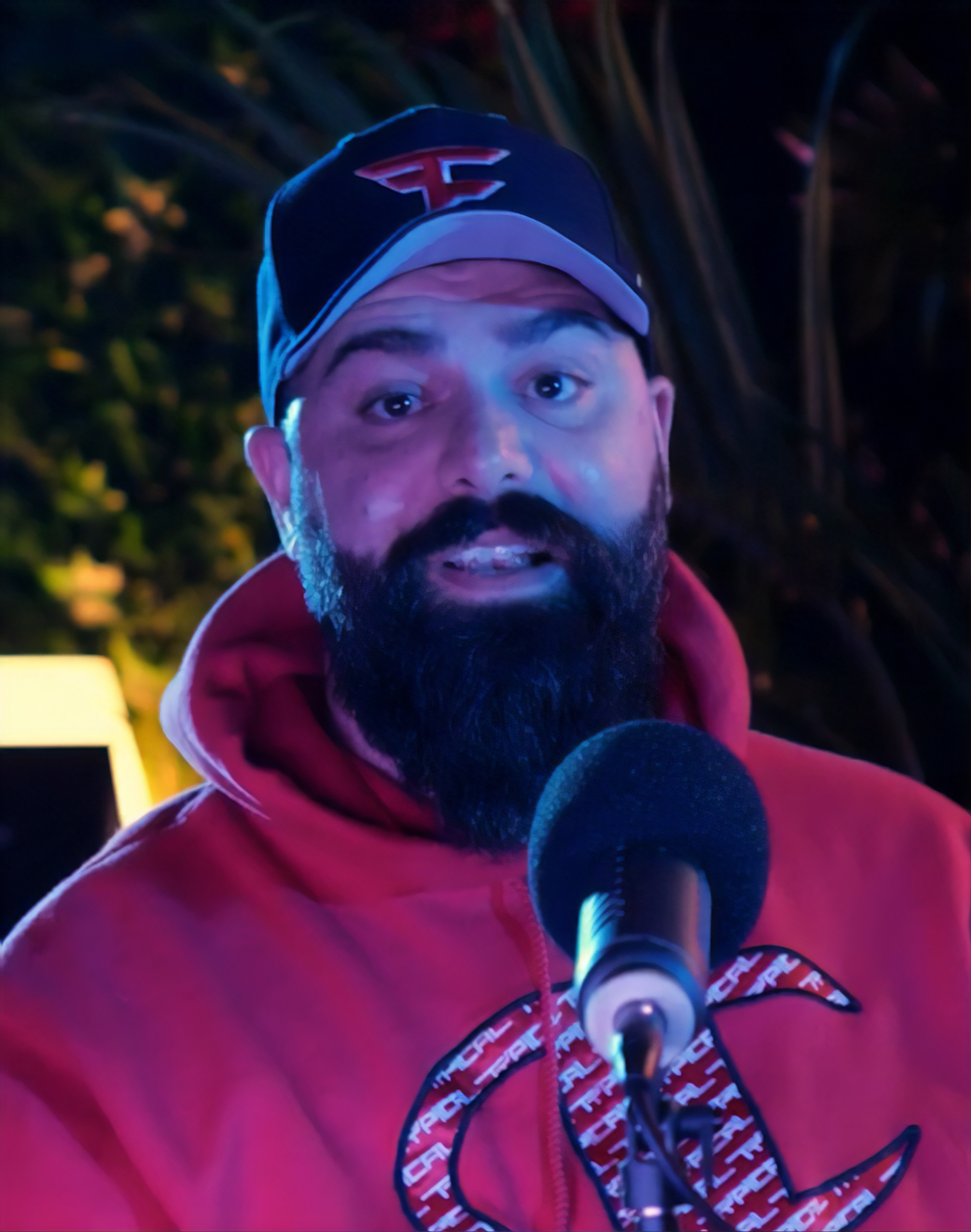
Keemstar, the creator of Minecraft Monday, in 2020

Minecraft Monday was created by Keemstar, a controversial internet personality known for his videos about social media drama, after the meme YouTuber Grandayy had spent over a year pushing for him to pursue the idea. Keemstar already hosted the event Fortnite Fridays, and would later launch a third competition, Warzone Wednesday. Like Keemstar's other tournaments, players were invited on basis of online following rather than gameplay skill, in order to attract viewership. The first event on June 24, 2019, was seen live by over one million viewers; according to Dexerto, the Fortnite player Ninja peaked at 400,000 concurrent viewers on his Twitch livestream, before he prematurely quit during the fourth game after dying quickly in every round. The participation of several prominent creators – including Ninja, PewDiePie, and James Charles – allowed Minecraft YouTuber Technoblade to rise in prominence, after he consecutively won the first two weeks of the tournament.

Technoblade's winning streak ended in Week 3, which was won by streamers Traves and Cscoop. Conflict generated within the tournament's community due to organizational issues; some viewers considered the teammatching unbalanced due to the participation of both veteran and beginner Minecraft players, and some criticized the minigame selection. Technoblade would win the tournament twice more, in Weeks 6 and 10. YouTuber Skeppy won with teammate BadBoyHalo in Weeks 5 and 7, and again with Vikkstar123 in Week 9. A duo consisting of streamers xQc and M0xxy won the tournament back-to-back in Weeks 12 and 13. At the end of the 13th week, YouTuber MrBeast collaborated with Keemstar during Hunger Games to place a $15,000 bounty on Technoblade, which was taken by Bajan Canadian.

The Minecraft Monday server was breached during Week 14 on October 7, 2019. Whilst the tournament was ongoing, hackers griefed buildings and the minigame arenas; Minecraft Monday, as well as Fortnite Fridays, were subsequently placed on hiatus. Keemstar complained on Twitter that they had been running Minecraft Monday on a "shoe-string budget" and had been cutting corners, but said that the tournament would return in November 2019. In May 2020, Keemstar's organization KeemPark posted a screenshot of a remade Minecraft Monday lobby, created in collaboration with Bajan Canadian and his developer. KeemPark stated the tournament would return within three weeks. Keemstar would tweet two months later that "Minecraft Monday is coming soon!", but the event would ultimately not return.

== Legacy ==
Writers credited Minecraft Monday with causing an increased attention towards Minecraft. Patricia Hernandez, a writer for Polygon, wrote that Minecraft Monday and other online projects, such as PewDiePie's playthrough of the game, caused a resurgence in the game's popularity. In an article for The Esports Observer, Max Miceli noted a significant increase in Twitch viewership for Minecraft as the event went on. While the game only rarely surpassed 500,000 hours watched a day prior to June 2019, the day of the first event reached 781,000 hours watched, and subsequent days surpassed one million.

Esport Insider's Marloes Valentina Stella described Minecraft Monday as the second major competitive tournament in Minecraft. Unlike the largely unsuccessful partnership of Badlion Client and major esports organizer ESL around 2017 (the first major tournament series), Stella thought the roster of well-known internet creators made it "no surprise that Minecraft Monday [became] the most famous Minecraft tournament". Regardless, she attributed the event's closure to community conflict, the hacking during Week 14, and the controversial status of Keemstar. YouTuber Smajor1995, who played in the event, said he was inspired by Minecraft Monday to create the tournament MC Championship, which he organizes with the group Noxcrew. Smajor liked the idea of bringing creators together for a Minecraft event, but found Keemstar hard to work with. According to Gökhan Çakır for Dot Esports, MC Championship was able to fill the "gigantic gap" in the competitive Minecraft scene after Minecraft Monday's closure.

== List of winners ==
Key
†	Highest score across all events

List of weeks with date, winning team, highest-placing player, and scores (Note: Event dates and scores are taken from Technoblade's livestream archives of the events (except for Week 12, which is taken from Vikkstar123): Week 1: $10,000 keemstar tournament (minecraft monday) (Livestream VOD). Technoblade. June 24, 2019 – via YouTube.; Week 2: minecraft monday week 2 (full stream) (Livestream VOD). Technoblade. July 1, 2019 – via YouTube.; Week 3: minigame madness (minecraft monday week 3 full stream) (Livestream VOD). Technoblade. July 15, 2019 – via YouTube.; Week 4: minecraft monday w/ James Charles (full stream) (Livestream VOD). Technoblade. July 8, 2019 – via YouTube.; Week 5: minecraft monday week 5 (Livestream VOD). Technoblade. July 22, 2019 – via YouTube.; Week 6: ruining minecraft monday w/ jschlatt (Livestream VOD). Technoblade. July 29, 2019 – via YouTube.; Week 7: obliterating minecraft monday w/ junkyjanker (Livestream VOD). Technoblade. August 5, 2019 – via YouTube.; Week 8: saving minecraft monday w/ DanTDM (Livestream VOD). Technoblade. August 12, 2019 – via YouTube.; Week 9: minecraft monday w/ JackSucksAtLife (Livestream VOD). Technoblade. August 19, 2019 – via YouTube.; Week 10: breaking minecraft monday records w/ ph1lza (Livestream VOD). Technoblade. August 26, 2019 – via YouTube.; Week 11: minecraft monday w/ ConnorEatsPants (Livestream VOD). Technoblade. September 2, 2019 – via YouTube.; Week 12: $10,000 MINECRAFT Monday Tournament w/ COURAGEJD (Week 12) (Livestream VOD). Vikkstar123HD. September 9, 2019 – via YouTube.; Week 13: suffering in minecraft monday w/ Wilbur Soot (Livestream VOD). Technoblade. September 16, 2019 – via YouTube.)
Event	Date	Winning team		Best individual	
Event	Date	Team	Score	Player	Score
Week 1	June 24, 2019	Team 16: Technoblade and ShotGunRaids	1,156	Technoblade	638
Week 2	July 1, 2019	Team 3: Technoblade and iBallisticSquid (Note: At the end of Week 2, the scores were adjusted to place James Charles and PewDiePie at first place as a joke, but Technoblade and iBallisticSquid were the actual winners.)	1,096	Technoblade	714
Week 3	July 8, 2019	Team 17: Traves and Cscoop	1,347	Technoblade	937
Week 4	July 15, 2019	Team 21: Vikkstar123 and PrestonPlayz	1,153	Vikkstar123	606
Week 5	July 22, 2019	Team 4: BadBoyHalo and Skeppy	1,096	FireBreathMan	796
Week 6	July 29, 2019	Team 2: Technoblade and Jschlatt	1,280	Technoblade	831
Week 7	August 5, 2019	Team 10: BadBoyHalo and Skeppy	1,451	Technoblade	931
Week 8	August 12, 2019	Team 10: Needlexd and MCmorganplayz	1,265	Needlexd	684
Week 9	August 19, 2019	Team 3: Vikkstar123 and Skeppy	1,552	Technoblade	910
Week 10	August 26, 2019	Team 4: Technoblade and Philza	1,892 †	Technoblade	1,080 †
Week 11	September 2, 2019	Team 9: BastiGHG and Aqua	1,700	Aqua	960
Week 12	September 9, 2019	Team 9: M0xyy and xQc	1,663	M0xyy	905
Week 13	September 16, 2019	Team 6: M0xyy and xQc	1,530	xNestorio	943
Week 14	October 7, 2019	Event canceled midway through due to server hacking			
