= SmallAnt =

Canadian internet personality (born 1996)

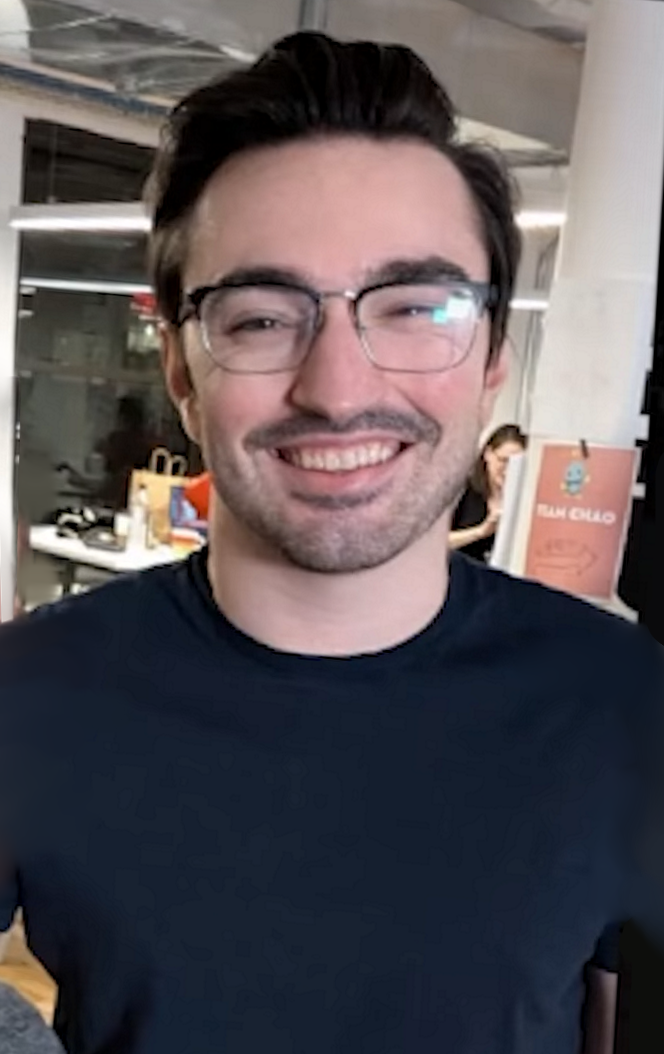
- SmallAnt in 2025
- Born: May 3, 1996 (age 30)

Twitch information
- Channel: SmallAnt
- Followers: 1.5 million

YouTube information
- Channel: SmallAnt
- Subscribers: 3.26 million
- Views: 959.3 million
- Last updated: November 12, 2026

Tanner Charles Minecraft (born May 3, 1996), known online as SmallAnt (previously SmallAnt1), is a Canadian streamer, speedrunner and YouTuber. He is known for creating content about challenge runs and speedruns in video games such as Super Mario Odyssey, the Pokémon franchise, and Minecraft, among others. These often feature mods, additional rules, or competitions against other creators. He has held multiple speedrun world records in multiple games including the 'Minimum Captures' category of Super Mario Odyssey. He won the Speedrunner of the Year award at the 2021 Streamer Awards.

== Internet career ==
SmallAnt began streaming on March 2, 2016. Some of his first content was inspired by the content creator FearsomeFire. On stream, he created levels in the game LittleBigPlanet 3, as well as doing playthroughs of video games. He began speedrunning Super Mario Odyssey by joining its first speedrunning tournament and placing third, and continued to speedrun the game. He started uploading Super Mario Odyssey speedrunning tutorials on his YouTube channel in early 2018, and started uploading stream highlights later that year.

SmallAnt first speedran the Minimum Captures category of Super Mario Odyssey after he hit a sub goal on his Twitch to try a new, weird speedrun. He continued to speedrun the category, earning former world records. He also began to upload challenges such as beating Super Mario Odyssey while blindfolded, or without taking any damage.

After having some burnout, SmallAnt decided to begin uploading non-Super Mario Odyssey-related content in games such as The Legend of Zelda: Breath of the Wild. These videos did better than expected, encouraging him to try out a wider variety of games and content. He was among the first to perform a 100% speedrun of Breath of the Wild, a lengthy run lasting many hours that earned several million views on YouTube. Later, in 2023, he would beat this record by tens of hours with a second run before the release of The Legend of Zelda: Tears of the Kingdom.

SmallAnt completed Pokémon Platinum without taking any damage, publishing a video on February 20, 2020. On July 4, 2020, he uploaded a video about his pursuit and achievement of the world record in sharpening pencils as fast as possible. Later that year, on October 20, he uploaded a Pokémon challenge showing his run of Pokémon SoulSilver in which he could only use Shiny Pokémon, which have only a 1/8192 chance of spawning. It achieved 17 million views. „Is it possible to beat Pokemon X if trainers are all LVL 100?“ is his most viewed video as of November 2026. SmallAnt was the first streamer to catch every Pokémon in the video game Pokémon Brilliant Diamond, doing so less than 48 hours after the game had released.

In 2022, SmallAnt uploaded a video showcasing Super Mario Odyssey: Online, a mod for Super Mario Odyssey that adds online multiplayer functionality into the game. The mod was created by CraftyBoss, and its hide-and-seek game mode was popular among streamers such as cjya, Fir, GrandPooBear, and SmallAnt himself.

In 2022, SmallAnt began a playthrough of Minecraft Skyblock, in which the player starts on an island with just a tree and a chest of items. Using Minecraft mechanics, he was able to complete a list of goals he had set for himself, and he published a video on this challenge on January 5, 2024, titled 'I took Minecraft's Most Popular Challenge to its Absolute Limits'. In May 2023, he was the second person to achieve 100% completion of Tears of the Kingdom, which took 139 hours. Soon after this, SmallAnt collected every rock in the game after a viewer sarcastically challenged him to do so.

In October 2023, SmallAnt competed with GrandPooBear in the Red Bull competition Settle the Score.

On February 27, 2024, SmallAnt released a video about his completion of the difficult 'Kaizo Ironmon' challenge in Pokémon FireRed. SmallAnt participated in MC Championship Season 4 Kick-Off, in which his team placed 4th out of 10, and he individually placed 20th out of 40. In July 2024, he uploaded his playthrough of Pokémon Ultra Sun but with dozens of rules suggested by his Twitch chat, such as playing the game in German – a challenge he had completed in 2022. Shortly after the release of The Legend of Zelda: Echoes of Wisdom, SmallAnt uploaded a video in which he played through the game, attempting to find and exploit glitches.

On October 29, 2025, Smallant became the 77th player to beat a hardcore nuzlocke of Pokemon Run and Bun, beating the game on his first attempt with the fifth lowest recorded amount of deaths, and the second player at the time to have beaten the game in one try. Despite this, he claims the reason he decided to attempt it in the first place was because he didn't want to do another nuzlocke ever again.

== Awards and nominations ==
Year	Ceremony	Category	Result	Ref.
2022	The Streamer Awards	Best Minecraft Streamer	Nominated	
2021	The Streamer Awards	Best Speedrunner	Won	
