= Hypixel Studios =

Canadian video game developer

Hypixel Studios Canada
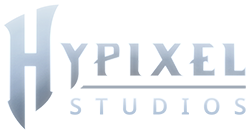
- Type: Private
- Industry: Video games
- Founded: 18 October 2018 / 14 December 2023
- Founders: Simon Collins-Laflamme; Philippe Touchette; Patrick Derbic; Kevin Carstens
- Key people: Simon Collins-Laflamme (co-founder, President); Philippe Touchette (co-founder, CFO); Patrick Derbic (co-founder, CEO); Kevin Carstens (co-founder, CTO)
- Products: Hytale
- Number of employees: 100+ (2026)
- Parent: Riot Games (2020–2025)
- Website: hytale.com

Hypixel Studios is a Canadian video game developer known for the sandbox game Hytale. It was formed in 2018 as a spin-off of Hypixel Inc., the company behind the Hypixel server for Minecraft, and was backed and later acquired by Riot Games. Riot cancelled Hytale and closed the studio in June 2025; later that year co-founder Simon Collins-Laflamme reacquired the game and renamed his existing studio (5350 Studios) to 'Hypixel Studios', which released Hytale in early access in January 2026.

== History ==
=== Origins and founding ===
Members of the team behind the Hypixel Minecraft server began developing Hytale in early 2015. The project's origins lay in 2014 changes to Mojang's end-user licence agreement, which barred Minecraft servers from selling purchases that affected gameplay and cut the Hypixel server's revenue by 85 per cent, prompting the team to pursue a game of its own.

Hypixel Studios was established as a spin-off of Hypixel Inc. to develop the game, and was registered as a Canadian corporation on 18 October 2018. Hytale was announced publicly on 13 December 2018, alongside an investment of several million dollars led by Riot Games and an advisory group that included Dennis Fong, Rob Pardo and Peter Levin. The game's announcement trailer drew more than 31 million views within a month. Collins-Laflamme later said the studio had been spending up to US$400,000 a month on development and had turned down larger offers from another company before partnering with Riot.

=== Riot Games ownership ===
Riot Games acquired the studio outright in April 2020. The Canadian-Irish studio then employed more than forty people, and it announced a permanent headquarters in Derry, Northern Ireland, with twenty new positions in back-office and quality assurance roles. The studio was led by co-founder and chief executive Aaron "Noxy" Donaghey, with a leadership team that included Sean McCafferty; both are natives of Derry. A British legal entity, Hypixel Studios Limited, had been incorporated in Northern Ireland in February 2020. More than 2.5 million people had signed up for Hytale's beta by the time of the acquisition, and by June 2023 the studio had grown to more than 110 employees.

Under Riot, Hytale, originally intended to be playable in 2021, was repeatedly delayed as its scope grew, and former developers later criticised the project's ambitions as unrealistic. The game was also migrated between engines, with a replacement engine built from 2022 ultimately abandoned. On 23 June 2025, after ten years of the game's development, Donaghey announced Hytale's cancellation and the closure of the studio, citing its overly ambitious scope. Some of the studio's former developers were subsequently hired by Anego Studios, the developer of Vintage Story, to work on a standalone game inspired by Hytale.

=== Revival ===
On 17 November 2025, Collins-Laflamme announced that he had reacquired Hytale from Riot Games, and the studio was revived with more than 30 rehired developers and further hiring planned; the returning founders promised ten years of support for the game and a return to its original vision. According to the studio, its original founders had not been involved with the project since 2020, and following the reacquisition it operates as an independent, self-funded company under the name Hypixel Studios Canada Inc. Collins-Laflamme and co-founder Philippe Touchette fund the studio personally, with a stated ten-year funding commitment and no external investors or publishers. Hytale entered early access on 13 January 2026 and passed one million players shortly after launch. Collins-Laflamme said shortly before launch that pre-orders alone had funded the studio's roughly 50-person team for the next two years of development.

Following the release, the studio ran the game's first official modding competition with CurseForge in early 2026, offering US$100,000 in prizes; by then players had created more than 5,000 mods for the game, downloaded over 20 million times on CurseForge. In June 2026 it announced "Hytale Shared Source", a programme giving licensed players access to the game's server source code, network protocol and assets. By March 2026 the team had grown to more than 100 people, drawn largely from the game's modding community. In July 2026 the studio previewed Chapter 1, the game's first major content expansion.

== Games ==
Year	Title	Platform(s)	Notes
2026	Hytale	Linux, macOS, Windows	Early access
