= Grandayy =

Maltese YouTuber and musician (born 1994)

- Born: 1 June 1994 (age 32); Malta
- Occupations: YouTuber; music producer; game developer

YouTube information
- Channel: Grandayy
- Years active: 2007–present
- Genres: Comedy; music
- Subscribers: 2.86 million
- Views: 937 million
- Last updated: 19 October 2026

Grandayy (born 1 June 1994), also known as grande1899, is a Maltese YouTuber and music producer known for his production of memes, covers of songs using the note block system in Minecraft, and other comedic content. He has been associated with other meme-oriented YouTubers such as Dolan Dark and FlyingKitty, as well as endorsed by various YouTubers such as PewDiePie and VoiceoverPete. As of February 2021, he is the most subscribed YouTuber from Malta, with over 2.9 million subscribers.

== Career ==
Grandayy graduated as a physician but has been focused on YouTube since 2011. He uploaded his first videos in 2007 on his original channel grande1899. In 2011, he uploaded multiple Minecraft noteblock song covers. On July 2, 2014, Grandayy created his second channel (now called Grandayy). On March 18, 2015, he posted the first meme to his Grandayy account, a Half-Life 3 meme using clips from the movie Interstellar. On November 1, 2016, he posted a "We Are Number One" meme on his Grandayy account, which was a mashup of the song of the same name from LazyTown and "Bring Me to Life" by Evanescence. On August 7, 2018, he became the first Maltese YouTuber to reach one million subscribers.

Grandayy suggested the concept of "Minecraft Monday" and convinced Keemstar to host the event. The event included PewDiePie and James Charles.

On March 3, 2023, It was announced that Grandayy was hired as a Junior Game Developer at Anvil Game Studios, and would be working on their flagship title Holdfast: Nations at War.

== Political views ==
Grandayy has been an outspoken opponent of Article 13 and believed the law could "kill the internet", warning that all broadcasters could face censorship from automated bots. He said "The sad thing is that us YouTubers have no lobby groups or unions that can fight for us and speak to politicians directly for us. Most politicians have no idea about the troubles YouTubers face with copyright, or what type of content the typical YouTuber even produces."
