= Nihachu =

German internet personality (born 2001)

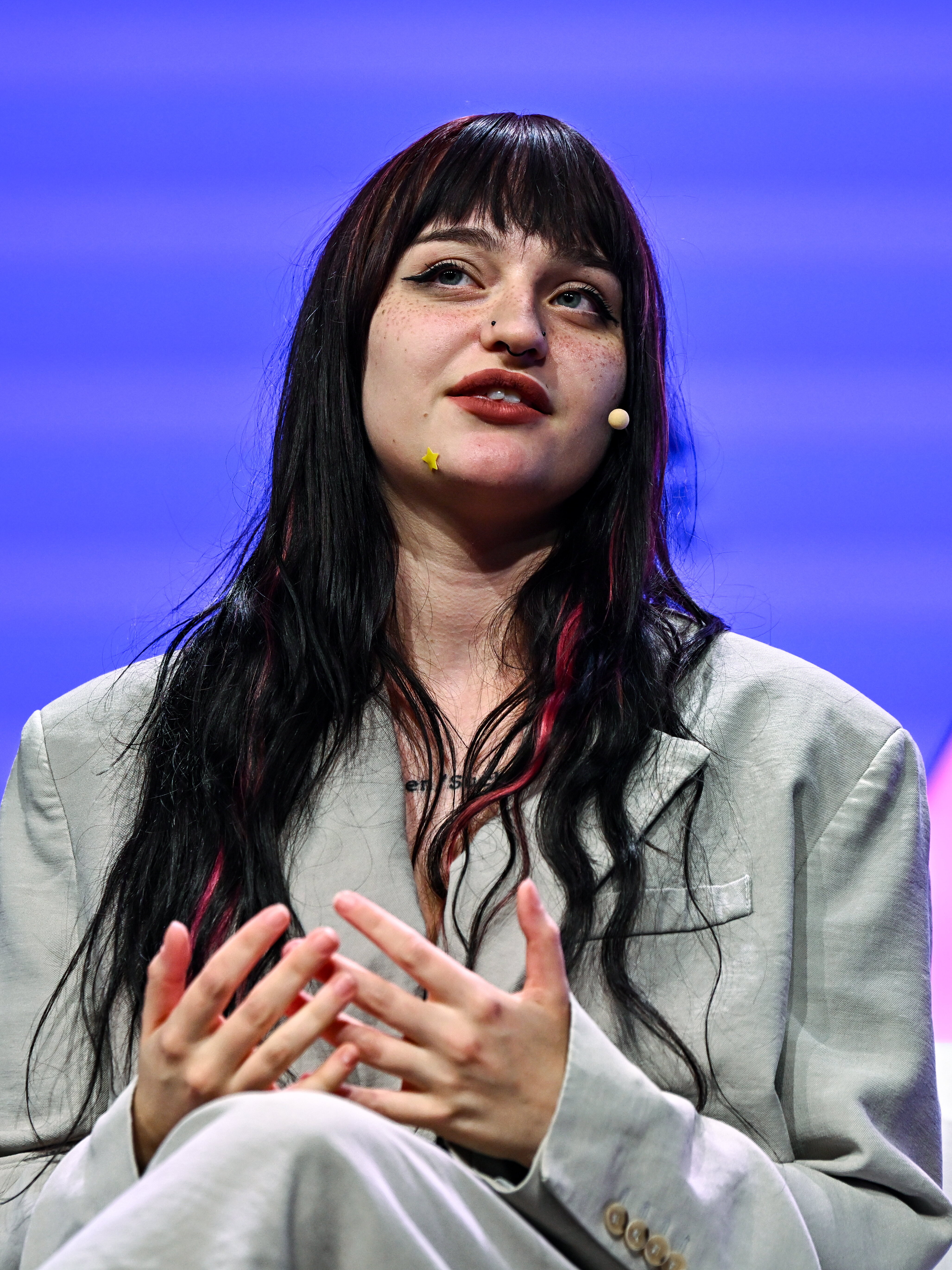
- Sembowski at Web Summit in November 2023
- Born: Nikita Sophie Sembowski; November 3, 2001 (age 24); Germany
- Other name: Niki Nihachu
- Organization: Team Liquid

Twitch information
- Channel: Nihachu
- Years active: 2015–present
- Genres: Gaming; Chatting
- Followers: 2.6 million (Note: Secondary or tertiary channels are not included in follower or viewer counts.)

YouTube information
- Channel: Niki Nihachu
- Years active: 2020–present
- Subscribers: 1.24 million
- Views: 38.45 million
- Nihachu's voice Nihachu telling a story in one of her Twitch streams in 2023.
- Last updated: July 21, 2026

Nikita Sophie Sembowski (born November 3, 2001), known professionally as Nihachu or Niki Nihachu, is a German Twitch streamer and YouTuber best known for her gaming commentary on Minecraft, vlogs and her Just Chatting streams. Nihachu gained popularity after appearing on AustinShow's Love or Host and her participation in the Dream SMP. Nihachu has been a member of Team Liquid and a promoter for the PC brand Alienware since 2023.

As of July 2026, Nihachu has a combined following of over 3 million across YouTube and Twitch.

== Early life ==
Nikita Sophie Sembowski was born on November 3, 2001 in Germany. At 6 years old, she and her younger brother were kidnapped by her mother's ex-husband, and remained with them for 3 years before being rescued by her mother and her mother's new boyfriend. She moved out of her home in Switzerland at 17, moving to Berlin, where she returned to school.

== Career ==
=== History ===
==== 2016–2020: Love or Host and Dream SMP ====
Nihachu began streaming in 2016, after an operation with her knees rendered her unable to walk for approximately a year. She created gameplay content of The Sims and reading creepypastas in German.

In 2020, she appeared on AustinShow's Love or Host, which helped her overall online growth. Her popularity continued to grow as she joined the Dream SMP on August 6, 2020. She continued to play frequently on the server and contributed to its lore until its closure. On December 31, 2020, Nihachu changed her hair color from blonde to bright pink, causing her to trend on the front page of Twitter.

==== 2020–present: Guild Esports, ЯReboot and VidCon ====
In 2021, Nihachu signed with Guild Esports. Nihachu was ranked in the top 20 most popular women streamers on Twitch, in 6th place. She was also a frequent competitor of MC Championship from 2020 to 2022.

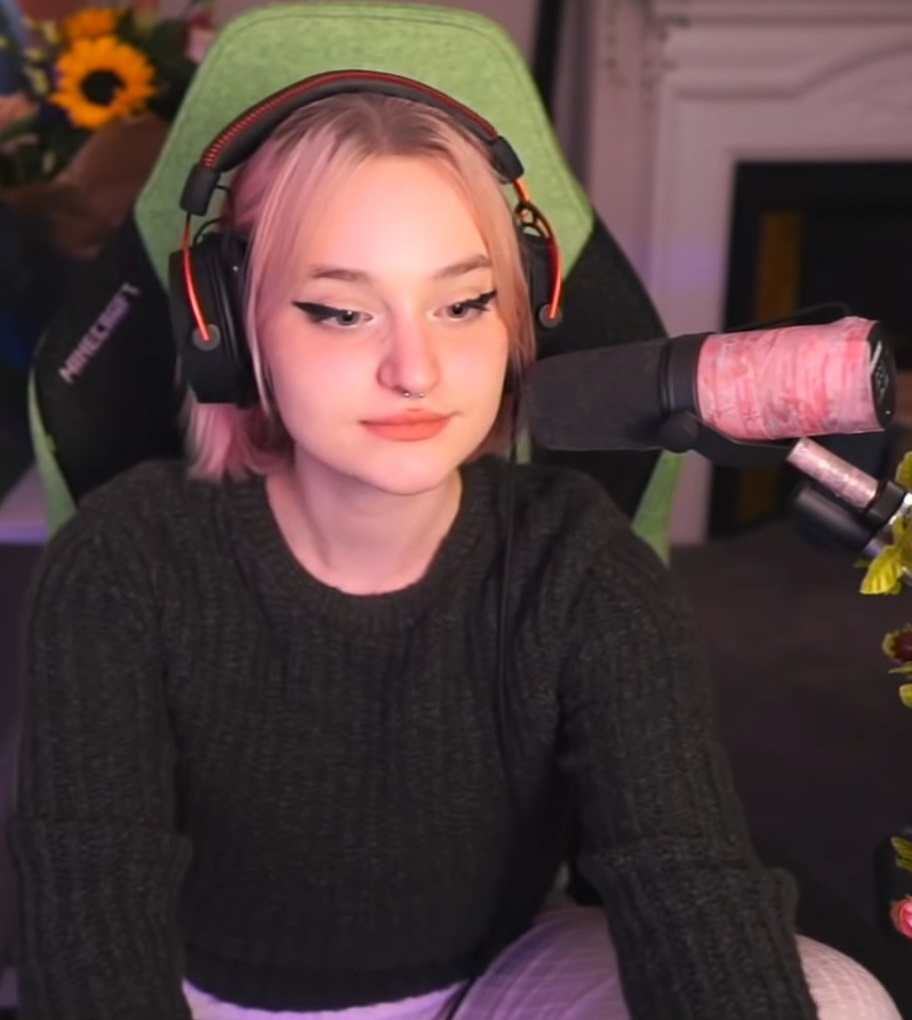
Nihachu in January 2022

In 2022, Nihachu appeared at TommyInnit's TommyInnit & Friends live show at the Brighton Dome on July 1, 2022, with other online content creators, including jacksepticeye, JackManifoldTV and DanTDM. That same year, Nihachu started a new gaming series called ЯReboot. The first episode was streamed on October 26, 2022.

In 2023, she was a speaker at Web Summit in Lisbon, Portugal. She also featured in the second episode of Ranboo's Generation Loss: The Social Experiments. Nihachu attended VidCon that same year as one of the featured creators.

In late 2023, she was then signed to the esports team Team Liquid.

=== Philanthropy ===
In June 2022, Nihachu participated in a Minecraft charity tournament held by MC Championship called MCC Pride with several other online creators. The event managed to raise over $145,000 for The Trevor Project.

== Personal life ==
Nihachu is pansexual. She has also struggled with body dysmorphia, eating disorders and eisoptrophobia (the fear of mirrors or one's own reflection).

She speaks German, Spanish, and English.
