= Hypixel =

Minecraft minigame server

Hypixel Network
- Other names: Hypixel
- Developer: Hypixel Inc.
- Release: April 13, 2013; 13 years ago
- Platform: Minecraft
- Available in: 25 languages
- List of languages Brazilian Portuguese, Chinese (Simplified), Chinese (Traditional), Czech, Danish, Dutch, English, Finnish, French, German, Greek, Hungarian, Italian, Japanese, Korean, Norwegian, Pirate English, Polish, Portuguese, Romanian, Russian, Spanish, Swedish, Turkish, Ukrainian
- Type: Minecraft server
- Website: hypixel.net; mc.hypixel.net (server IP)

Hypixel Network is a Minecraft server that hosts minigames. It was released on April 13, 2013, by Simon "hypixel" Collins-Laflamme and Philippe "Rezzus" Touchette, and is managed and run by Hypixel Inc. Hypixel is only available on the Java Edition of Minecraft, but briefly had a Pocket Edition variant.

== History ==
The Hypixel server was released in beta on April 13, 2013, by Simon Collins-Laflamme and Philippe Touchette. The server is managed and run by Hypixel Inc. The two originally created Minecraft adventure maps together and uploaded trailers to their YouTube channel. The Hypixel server was created to play and further showcase these maps. Minigames were originally created for users to play on while waiting for other players, but the minigames themselves gained popularity. Efforts from Hypixel were put towards new server content instead of the making of other Minecraft maps and games.

Hypixel Inc., Hypixel's maintainer, was registered as a Canadian corporation under the name "8414483 Canada Inc" on January 23, 2013. Its name was then modified to "Hypixel Inc." on February 2, 2015.

In 2015, it was revealed that the server cost around $100,000 a month to maintain.

During the COVID-19 pandemic, the server regularly reached over 150,000 concurrent players, peaking at a record 216,000 on April 16, 2021. On December 21, 2016, Hypixel reached 10 million unique players in total, and had reached 14.1 million unique players when Hytale was announced on December 13, 2018. The server reached 18 million unique players in April 2020, according to a tweet by the server owner. As of September 2015, Hypixel attracts 1.9 million players every month.

Players of the server community banded together to write over 400,000 messages of condolences for the content creator Technoblade following his death in July 2022. The messages were compiled into 21 books and delivered to his family.

On August 1, 2024, TommyInnit hit 15 million subscribers on YouTube. As per agreement between Simon and Tom, Simon donated $50,000 to the Sarcoma Foundation of America and gave Tom the 'INNIT' rank on the server.

=== Hypixel China ===
In May 2017, Hypixel partnered with NetEase, the publisher of Minecraft China, to release a version of Hypixel in China. This separate version of Minecraft and the Hypixel Minecraft server would be operated and translated by NetEase, as part of their partnership.

On April 13, 2020, due to the expiration of their agreement, NetEase announced that the Chinese version of the server would be shut down on June 30, 2020.

=== Cyberattacks ===
Around April 2018, Hypixel began to use Cloudflare Spectrum for DDoS mitigation after being the victim of multiple attacks hosted by Mirai malware.

On June 18, 2021, Hypixel shut down for emergency maintenance, stating their host was under "large-scale denial-of-service attacks". Connection problems were reported by players before the server was shut down, and the Hypixel team had claimed to have "identified the issue with an upstream provider". The server subsequently remained closed for four days before fully reopening. In its statement, the Hypixel team re-iterated that they had "dealt with DDoS attacks for well over 8 years", and that "recent changes at [their] host caused a flaw in [their] setup".

== Gameplay ==
Hypixel has various multiplayer minigames created by modifying and repurposing the game mechanics of Minecraft. Such minigames include Bedwars, where players must destroy opponents' beds to prevent them from respawning after death, or Skywars, a similar game where players spawn on different islands and must kill other players using gear and weapons looted from chests strewn through the map. Hypixel also has its own variation of Skyblock, where it functions more similar to an MMORPG with various islands complete with shops and quests. Its players can purchase cosmetics and ranks that grant them certain in-game convenience features.

== See also ==
- Hytale, a sandbox video game by Hypixel Studios
- Technoblade, former notable Hypixel YouTuber (deceased)
