= Potato War =

Potato War may refer to:

- Musket Wars (1806-1845)
- Pig War (1859), a confrontation over the British–U.S. border in the San Juan Islands
- Lassen County Potato War of 1857, killing and wounding of Washoe people in Milford, California area and Honey Lake Valley area
- War of the Bavarian Succession (1778–1779)
- The Great Potato war, YouTube series by Technoblade
