= Philza =

English Twitch streamer and YouTuber (born 1988)

- Watson's Twitch and YouTube icon
- Born: Phillip Watson; 1 March 1988 (age 38)
- Other name: Ph1LzA
- Occupations: Twitch streamer; YouTuber
- Spouse: Kristin Rosales (m. 2020)

Twitch information
- Channel: Philza
- Years active: 2009–present
- Genre: Gaming
- Game: Minecraft
- Followers: 4.3 million

YouTube information
- Channel: Ph1LzA
- Years active: 2006–present
- Genre: Minecraft
- Subscribers: 2.92 million (main channel); 3.31 million (combined) (Note: Subscribers, broken down by channel: 2.92 million (Ph1LzA) 103 thousand (Philza VODS) 293 thousand (PhilzaCLIPS))
- Views: 276.5 million
- Last updated: 17 October 2026
- Website: ph1lzamerch.com

Phillip Watson (born 1 March 1988), known online as Philza or Ph1LzA, is an English Twitch streamer and YouTuber. He is known for his Minecraft hardcore series, where he plays the game on its most difficult setting, with permadeath (one life per game) and no respawns. Watson also formerly held the world record for the longest-running Minecraft hardcore world. As of October 2026, he had 4.3 million followers on Twitch.

== Early life ==
Phillip Watson was born on 1 March 1988. He is from Newcastle upon Tyne, England.

He worked in a retail job for more than a decade while making content on Twitch and YouTube before quitting his job to become a full-time content creator.

== Career ==
=== 2006–2013: Early career ===
Watson created his YouTube account in 2006 and started his channel by uploading Halo 2 and Skate 2 content. He created his Twitch (then Justin.tv) account "Philza" in 2009.

=== 2014–2019: Minecraft hardcore series and initial growth ===
In 2014, Watson started his Minecraft hardcore series, playing the game in its most difficult setting with increased mobs difficulty, permadeath (one life per game), and no respawns. The series garnered significant attention in April 2019 when Watson's then-world-record five-year hardcore run ended due to a surprise attack by a fully enchanted golden-armoured baby zombie, a spider, and a skeleton. Watson has described this event as a turning point in his career, propelling him from an average viewership of 5–15 per stream to roughly 180 viewers on Twitch. The success of the series ultimately led him to leave his retail job and pursue content creation full-time.

On 26 July 2019, Watson was featured in the official Minecraft series Meet a Minecrafter.

=== 2020–present: Continued growth ===
In October 2021, Watson appeared in the Twitch leaks, which disclosed the top Twitch streamers' revenue from August 2019 to October 2021. Watson placed 47th on the list, with a reported payout of $1,364,215.61 for this time period.

In 2023, Watson, along with fellow Twitch streamers and YouTubers TommyInnit, Wilbur Soot, Slimecicle, and Ranboo, started a new comedy group YouTube channel called The Sorry Boys. The channel mainly posted sketch comedy group vlog content. The group went on an indefinite hiatus in March 2024.

== Philanthropy ==
In September 2021, Watson participated in a charity livestream fundraising event organized by fellow streamer and YouTuber Technoblade. The event featured a Minecraft game where Watson served as one of the "hunters" tasked with pursuing Technoblade. They managed to raise more than $324,000 for the Sarcoma Foundation of America.

== Personal life ==
Watson met his wife, Kristin Rosales, an American, on Twitch and began dating. They were married on 12 March 2020, at the Old Orange County Courthouse in Santa Ana, California.

== Filmography ==
=== Web ===
Year(s)	Title	Role	Episodes	Ref.
2019	Meet a Minecrafter	Himself	1	
