= Wynncraft =

Minecraft server

- Release: April 29, 2013; 13 years ago
- Platform: Minecraft: Java Edition
- Type: Minecraft server
- Website: wynncraft.com; play.wynncraft.com (server)

Wynncraft is a fantasy massively multiplayer online role-playing game (MMORPG) Minecraft server released in April 2013 and inspired by RuneScape. The server runs on a heavily modified version of Minecraft, preserving few mechanics from the base game. Players progress by completing activities such as dungeons, quests, or raids.

== History ==
One of the server's owners, Salted, thought that, given the lack of RPG Minecraft servers at the time, that they should make it.

Jumla, Salted, and Grian founded Wynncraft in April 2013. On 4 July 2017, Wynncraft was awarded a Guinness World Record for the largest MMORPG built in Minecraft.

In October 2022, Wynncraft received a 2.5 Tbit/s DDoS attack but was mitigated by Cloudflare.

Patch 2.0 expanded game mechanics and added a new raid. After patch 2.0, Wynncraft focused on improving its endgame. This included improved housing, the addition of Lootrun, a roguelike game where the goal is to finish as many tasks as possible, and missions, copied from Hearthstone Battlegrounds. A patch in October 2023 increased the render distance from 6 to 12 chunks while maintaining the same performance. The "Rekindled World" update in August 2024 overhauled raids and improved the user interface.

Wynncraft received its biggest expansion in 2026, which added the endgame province of Fruma. It also expanded player abilities, overhauled many mechanics, and increased the maximum level.

== Gameplay ==
Wynncraft's gameplay includes completing quests, participating in guild activities, and completing dungeons and raids. The server's world has an approximate size of 4,400 by 5,500 blocks (meters), and is fully hand-built. It is composed of the three regional provinces of Wynn, Gavel, and Fruma, divided by an ocean containing various islands such as Corkus, alongside other world regions such as the Silent Expanse. Players select a class between Archer, Assassin, Mage, Warrior, and Shaman before starting the tutorial near the city of Ragni. Wynncraft has over a hundred quests. Aside from the cost of Minecraft, the server is free-to-play, with players being able to purchase in-game perks and items.

To avoid lag, the server is split into 50-player worlds. Players can still see players in other worlds, but are not able to interact with them.

== Mechanics ==
Wynncraft uses modified Minecraft game mechanics. For example, to add new mobs to the server, it uses custom armor stands, with move commands so it acts like a normal Minecraft mob. Note blocks are used to create custom music, and to show quest locations, instead of using a Minecraft beacon, it uses mobs that hold a beacon, stacked on top of each other.

== Reception ==
Wynncraft received generally positive reviews. Writing for Kotaku Australia, Luke Plunkett praised Wynncraft's map and called the server "a full and proper MMO". Carl Velasco of Tech Times said that the server is "nuts" and "a stunning example of what can be created using Minecraft's own sandbox engine". Austin Wood, writing for PC Gamer, was "continually floored by all you can do".

According to Tebex, the server's payment provider, 5.2 million players have played on the server as of August 2026. The highest number of concurrent players on the server is around 10,000, set in January 2026.
