= MC Championship =

Minecraft competition

- Game: Minecraft
- Founded: 2019; 7 years ago
- First season: Season 1 (2019–2020)
- Administrator: Scott Major
- Organising body: Noxcrew
- No. of teams: 10
- Competitors: 40 (per event)
- Most titles: Smajor1995 (9 wins)
- Website: mcchampionship.com

MC Championship (MCC) is a Minecraft YouTuber tournament organized by YouTuber Scott Major (known online as Smajor1995 or Dangthatsalongname) and Minecraft collective Noxcrew. Ten teams of four compete in a series of Minecraft minigames. The tournament began its first season on 17 November 2019. Its sixth season and current season began on 14 February 2026.

== Gameplay ==
The event features ten teams of four players, each composed of a rotating cast of established content creators, competing in each iteration of the tournament. They face off in eight minigames that test a variety of core skills in Minecraft, such as combat, parkour, survival, and teamwork. Teams win coins for their performance in each minigame.

At the end of the event, the two teams with the most coins duel in Dodgebolt, a best-of-five archery game that determines the winner of the event.

=== List of games ===
List of MC Championship games
Game	Type	Span	Description
Ace Race	Movement	MCC 7–	Players run laps through a race course scattered with special powerups.
Battle Box	PVP	MCC 2–	Teams compete head to head to fill a central area with concrete and/or trying to eliminate all the opposing players.
Big Sales at Build Mart	Team	MCC 3–	Players recreate a series of builds block for block.
Bingo but Fast	Team	MCC 6–13, 34–	Teams gather items and complete tasks on a bingo card.
Dodgebolt	—N/a	MCC 1–	The top two teams duel it out with bows and arrows for the championship.
Foot Race	Movement	MCC 1–6	Players run through a race course while trying to sabotage opponents and avoid obstacles.
Grid Runners	Team	MCC 16–	Teams complete challenges to progress through a series of rooms.
Hole in the Wall	Movement	MCC 1–	Players avoid getting knocked off a shrinking platform by moving walls.
Lockout Bingo	Team	MCC 1–5	Player complete tasks on a bingo board while being able to attack opponents.
Meltdown	PVP	MCC 22–	Teams use bows to freeze opposing players and collect coins from crates around the map; teams are eliminated when all of their players are frozen, but players can be revived when heaters are placed nearby.
Parkour Tag	Movement	MCC 12–	Teams play 1v3 elimination tag on a circular parkour course.
Parkour Warrior	Movement	MCC 1–11, 26–	Players try to complete an obstacle course within a time limit, with progressive difficulty and optional parkour challenges. Inspired by the game show Ninja Warrior.
Railroad Rush	Team	MCC 4KO-	Teams must work together to create the longest rail-road using gold found throughout the map, or in the "Gold Rush", a minute long break where all teams are placed in a lava-filled gold mine.
Rocket Spleef	Movement	MCC 1–13	Players try to eliminate opponents off the arena while trying to survive with a pair of elytras and a special rocket launcher.
Rocket Spleef Rush	Movement	MCC 20–	Players try to survive using a pair of elytras and a custom rocket launcher while platforms gradually appear and disappear.
Sands of Time	Team	MCC 5–	Teams explore a procedurally-generated dungeon, while trying to keep track and top up their time in the dungeon. Noxcrew's lead game designer, Isaac "Epic Landlord" Wilkins, came up with the idea while sitting for his GCSE in religious studies.
Sky Battle	PVP	MCC 9–	Teams fight each other on floating structures as the map border shrinks.
Skyblockle	PVP	MCC 1–8, AF	Teams gather items (Much like in the classic map "Skyblock") to fight each other. The last team standing wins.
Survival Games	PVP	MCC 1–	Teams open chests and find loot to fight each other while the border shrinks as the game progresses.
TGTTOSAWAF	Movement	MCC 1–	Players race across a series of maps. Short for "To Get to the Other Side and Whack a Fan". One of the maps was inspired by the game show Takeshi's Castle.

== History ==
=== Background ===
Noxcrew, the creative team behind MC Championship, was founded in 2011 by Stefan "Noxite" Panić. Noxcrew first organized on the sandbox game Garry's Mod, where members collaborated on various creative projects. They soon turned to Minecraft, another sandbox game, and their creative projects there became popular on Minecraft forums. The Noxcrew Gameshow, a spiritual ancestor to MCC in which content creators play classic game shows recreated in Minecraft, ran from 2012 to 2015. Noxcrew incorporated in 2017 and grew over time to include about 50 volunteer members in 2022; it had more than 30 staff in 2024.

Scott Major, a Scottish YouTuber also known as Smajor1995 or Dangthatsalongname, said he got the idea for MCC after playing in Minecraft Monday, a Minecraft team competition hosted by Keemstar. He said he liked the general format but found Keemstar hard to work with. When Minecraft Monday ended in late 2019, there was an opening for a new personality-driven Minecraft esports competition. Major said he approached Panić of Noxcrew for advice, and Panić volunteered to collaborate to produce a new event.

=== Debut and development ===
MC Championship was announced on Twitter and YouTube on 8 November 2019. The first event was held the next week on 17 November 2019. Events continue to be held about once a month. Most participants livestream their points of view on YouTube or Twitch. MCC's rise coincided with the COVID-19 pandemic. An estimated 500,000 concurrent viewers (including 100,000 for Dream) watched MCC 9 in September 2020, and MCC 15 peaked at 913,000 viewers in July 2021. MCC was "the biggest competitive Minecraft event" by early 2022; Major said earlier that it was the world's "largest Minecraft streaming event". Viewership declined to an average of over 100,000 by the end of 2022.

MCC has evolved over the years with new maps, designs, and players. Development of new maps begins with a stage of prototyping called greyboxing in which key elements are laid out without consideration for décor. Existing games have occasionally been "remixed" to be played with different mechanics. Team composition is shuffled by Major each event for the sake of competitive balance as well as player preferences for profanity use and requests for one teammate. About three new players are admitted each event. A score-tracking website, MCC Live, launched in May 2021.

=== Non-canon events ===
Several special non-canon MCC events have taken place. A Pride-themed event in June 2021 raised more than US$300,000 for the nonprofit the Trevor Project. MCC Rising events have featured less established Minecraft content creators, while MCC All-Stars featured lineups of only past MCC winners. MCC Underdogs included only players who had not won any event up to that point. Wins in the Rising and "invitational tournaments", such as the Jingle Jam, Magenta eTrophy and Hispano events, do not count towards the overall wins of players.

=== Fan engagement ===
MCC has invited fans to participate in several ways. Fans comprised two of the teams competing in MCC 10 in September 2020. A public Minecraft server called MCC Island, featuring a selection of MCC minigames, was announced on 29 May 2021. The server opened in closed beta on 20 August 2022. Noxcrew crowdsourced builds for the Big Sales at Build Mart minigame in April 2022. In June 2024, Noxcrew collaborated with Minecraft to make a public server, in which special challenges were added for each MCC team each rewarding an emote, at last completing them would give a special MCC cape reward compatible on both editions.

== List of champions ==
The Cyan Coyotes, the winning team of MC Championship's Project G.L.O.P in May 2026

Date	Event	Winner	Team members
Season 1 (2019–2020)
17 November 2019	1	Purple Pandas	Michaelmcchill, Kara Corvus, Kratzy, King_Burren
9 February 2020	2	Aqua Horses (Note: Now Aqua Axolotls)	Quig, HBomb94, Ryguyrocky, MiniMukaYT
14 March 2020	3	Orange Ocelots	Vikkstar123, PeteZahHutt, Smajor1995, Shubble
18 April 2020	4	Purple Pandas	Wilbur Soot, Technoblade, TommyInnit, Ph1LzA
16 May 2020	5	Yellow Yaks	Smajor1995 (2), Shubble (2), Quig (2), Seapeekay
13 June 2020	6	Blue Bats	Fruitberries, Fundy, CaptainPuffy, Bitzel
18 July 2020	7	Green Guardians (Note: Now Green Geckos)	PeteZahHutt (2), fWhip, Eret, HBomb94 (2)
15 August 2020	8	Pink Parrots	Dream, Technoblade (2), King_Burren (2), Michaelmcchill (2)
12 September 2020	9	Blue Bats	HBomb94 (3), Fruitberries (2), FalseSymmetry, Rendog
26 September 2020	10	Orange Ocelots	PeteZahHutt (3), SmallishBeans, FalseSymmetry (2), Cubfan135
24 October 2020	11	Fuchsia Frankensteins (Note: Replaced Pink Parrots for this Halloween event)	Dream (2), GeorgeNotFound, Sapnap, Karl Jacobs
14 November 2020	12	Green Guardians (Note: Now Green Geckos)	GeorgeNotFound (2), Ph1LzA (2), TapL, Wilbur Soot (2)
5 December 2020	Jingle Jam	Simon's Angels (Note: Replaced Red Rabbits for this special event)	InTheLittleWood, Lewis Brindley, Simon Lane, SolidarityGaming
12 December 2020	13	Teal Turkeys (Note: Replaced Aqua Axolotls for this festive season event)	Eret (2), Illumina, Krinios, Punz
Season 2 (2021–2022)
29 May 2021	14	Aqua Axolotls	HBomb94 (4), Smajor1995 (3), SolidarityGaming, Wisp
26 June 2021	Pride 21	Aqua Axolotls	Illumina (2), Gizzy Gazza, KreekCraft, Ryguyrocky (2)
24 July 2021	15	Red Rabbits	Dream (3), Sapnap (2), Michaelmcchill (3), Quackity
28 August 2021	16	Pink Parrots	Dream (4), F1NN5TER, BadBoyHalo, Seapeekay (2)
18 September 2021	17	Orange Ocelots	FalseSymmetry (3), Grian, PeteZahHutt (4), SB737
2 October 2021	Rising	Pink Parrots	jojosolos, SpeedSilver, xNestorio, Blushi
23 October 2021	18	Mustard Mummies (Note: Replaced Yellow Yaks for this Halloween event)	Sylvee, Tubbo, Sapnap (3), Smajor1995 (4)
13 November 2021	All-Stars	Red Rabbits	Sapnap (4), BadBoyHalo (2), Dream (5), GeorgeNotFound (3)
11 December 2021	19	Teal Turkeys (Note: Replaced Cyan Coyotes for this festive season event)	Ph1LzA (3), Sneegsnag, TommyInnit (2), Sapnap (5)
26 March 2022	20	Aqua Axolotls	HBomb94 (5), 5up, GeminiTay, Antfrost
30 April 2022	21	Cyan Coyotes	Sapnap (6), Seapeekay (3), Snifferish, KryticZeuz
28 May 2022	22	Pink Parrots	Purpled, TommyInnit (3), CaptainSparklez, TheOrionSound
18 June 2022	Pride 22	Red Rabbits	Dream (6), GeorgeNotFound (4), Karl Jacobs (2), Foolish Gamers
23 July 2022	23	Orange Ocelots	Quig (3), InTheLittleWood (2), Eret (3), F1NN5TER (2)
22 August 2022	24	Yellow Yaks	Dream (7), BadBoyHalo (3), Skeppy, GeorgeNotFound (5)
24 September 2022	25	Green Geckos	SmallishBeans (2), jojosolos (2), GoodTimesWithScar, Seapeekay (4)
3 October 2022	26	Violet Vampires (Note: Replaced Purple Pandas for this Halloween event)	Fruitberries (3), Philza (4), Shubble (3), TheOrionSound (2)
12 November 2022	27 – Underdogs	Purple Pandas	Blushi, FireBreathMan, BdoubleO100, impulseSV
3 December 2022	28	Teal Turkeys	Punz (2), Sneegsnag (2), SolidarityGaming (2), CaptainSparklez (2)
Season 3 (2023)
18 March 2023	29	Aqua Axolotls	HBomb94 (6), Kratzy (2), Cubfan135 (2), FalseSymmetry (4)
1 April 2023	Scuffed	Blue Bats	GeminiTay (2), fWhip (2), SmallishBeans (3), Smajor1995 (5)
1 April 2023	Scuffed	Lime Llamas	Skeppy (2), awesamdude, BadBoyHalo (4), Ponk
29 April 2023	30	Purple Pandas	SolidarityGaming (3), FireBreathMan (2), InTheLittleWood (3), Smajor1995 (6)
20 May 2023	31	Red Rabbits	jojosolos (3), Shadoune666, OllieGamerz, CapitanGatoYT
10 June 2023	Pride 23	Purple Pandas	Kratzy (3), Mysticat, Elaina_Exe, Gizzy Gazza (2)
15 July 2023	32	Red Rabbits	Antfrost (2), Ranboo, Aimsey, GoodTimesWithScar (2)
5 August 2023	33	Red Rabbits	Sapnap (7), Ponk (2), Punz (3), vGumiho
26 August 2023	Rising 2	Lime Llamas	Nominalgravy, WadeBox, NomadOfTheWorld, KhaosKorps
16 September 2023	34	Cyan Coyotes	OllieGamerz (2), Sapnap (8), Shadoune666 (2), RedVelvetCake
20 October 2023	Twitch Rivals	Yellow Yaks	Antfrost (3), awesamdude (2), Cubfan135 (3), CaptainSparklez (3)
11 November 2023	Party	Cyan Coyotes	Elaina_Exe (2), Fruitberries (4), Hannahxxrose, vGumiho (2)
9 December 2023	35	Pink Presents (Note: Replaced Pink Parrots for this festive season event)	Wallibear, Shubble (4), Hannahxxrose (2), Kratzy (4)
Season 4 (2024)
4 May 2024	Season 4 Kick-Off	Red Rabbits	Feinberg, TheOrionSound (3), Kara Corvus (2), ChilledChaos
1 June 2024	Pride 24	Cyan Coyotes	jojosolos (4), Hannahxxrose (3), Aimsey (2), PearlescentMoon
30 June 2024	Twitch Rivals Europe	Cyan Coyotes	5up (2), Jeremy Frieser, Snifferish (2), Wolfeei
27 July 2024	The Ender Cup	Purple Pandas	Smajor1995 (7), PearlescentMoon (2), fWhip (3), bekyamon
7 September 2024	Rising 3	Pink Parrots	ashswagg, Block Facts, PrinceZam, Squiddo
21 September 2024	Twitch Rivals San Diego	Red Rabbits	BaboAbe, Guqqie, Shadoune666 (3), Sneegsnag (3)
26 October 2024	Haunted Hoedown	Aqua Abominations (Note: Replaced Aqua Axolotls for this Halloween event)	AntVenom, ghostiefruit, CaptainSparklez (4), Shadoune666 (4)
7 December 2024	Party 2	Orange Ocelots	Antfrost (4), GeminiTay (3), impulseSV (2), Smajor1995 (8)
Season 5 (2025)
3 May 2025	Blank Canvas	Purple Pandas	CaptainPuffy (2), FireBreathMan (3), Krinios (2), Snifferish (3)
1 June 2025	Colour the World	Pink Parrots	aimsey (3), guqqie (2), Pangi, SandwichLord
14 June 2025	Magenta eTrophy: MCC Edition	Orange Ocelots	LetsHugo, FlentroX, Mikagoated, luucaalol
28 June 2025	Pride 25	Cyan Coyotes	5up (3), Eskay, Rainhoe, sleepy
13 September 2025	Builders' Guild	Cyan Coyotes	Katherine Elizabeth, Purpled (2), Shubble (5), TapL (2)
19 October 2025	The Copper Crown	Pink Parrots	fruitberries (5), GeminiTay (4), GoodTimesWithScar (3), Grian (2)
15 November 2025	Mash Up	Yellow Yaks	4CVIT, bekyamon (2), DrGluon, Feinberg (2)
13 December 2025	Snow Down	Sapphire Santas (Note: Replaced Blue Bats for this festive season event)	5up (4), Antfrost (5), Steven Suptic, xChocoBars
Season 6 (2026)
14 February 2026	Double Date	Red Rabbits	4CVIT (2), ish13c, Cambam010, Smajor1995 (9)
21 March 2026	Spell Bound	Orange Ocelots	Antfrost (6), FalseSymmetry (5), Rendog (2), Seapeekay (5)
12 April 2026	Hermit Takeover	Lime Llamas	hypnotizd, impulseSV (3), InTheLittleWood (3), Taneesha
31 May 2026	Project G.L.O.P.	Cyan Coyotes	aypierre, MathoX, Shadoune666 (5), TheGuill84
27 June 2026	Pride 26	Red Rabbits	Feinberg (3), Grian (3), Shubble (6), ZombieCleo
22 August 2026	Hispano	Red Rabbits	Diffrent, MeowyNissi, RaptorGamer, Shadoune666
5 September 2026	Fall Stars	Red Rabbits	aimsey (4), bekyamon (3), ghostiefruit (2), hannahxxrose (4)
10 October 2026	Bewitched!	Red Ravens (Note: Replaced Red Rabbits for this Halloween event)	Feinberg (4), Graecie, PrinceZam, Rendog (3)
15 November 2026	Absolute Zero	Orange Ocelots	hannahxxrose (5), ish13c (2), MinuteTech, TinaKitten

== MCC Island ==
MCC Island was announced on May 30, 2021, advertised as a public Minecraft server featuring mini-games inspired from MC Championships. The server was released under a closed beta on August 20, 2022. Players were able to join by earning a ticket, either by purchasing or joining the waitlist. On June 13, 2023, the server was now under an open beta and would finally release to the public on June 20, 2023. The server also gives MCC competitors a chance to practice the minigames between events.

Game	Type	Description
Battle Box	PvP	Teams compete head to head to fill a central area with concrete and/or trying to eliminate all the opposing players.
Dynaball	PvP	Two teams of eight have to defend their territory while attacking the other team with TNT and other gadgets.
Fishing	Strategy	Players individually find fishing spots to attempt to get fish and treasure on different islands. The game features an RPG-like progression separate from that of the rest of the server.
Hole in the Wall	Movement	Players avoid getting knocked off a shrinking platform by moving walls.
Parkour Warrior Dojo	Movement	Play through a series of parkour courses that reset every month.
Parkour Warrior Survivor	Movement	Players try to complete an obstacle course within a time limit, with progressive difficulty and optional parkour challenges. Inspired by the game show Ninja Warrior.
Sky Battle	PvP	Teams fight each other on floating structures as the map border shrinks. The solo version was added in 2026.
Rocket Spleef Rush	Movement	Players try to survive using a pair of elytras and a custom rocket launcher while platforms gradually appear and disappear.
TGTTOS	Movement	Players race across a series of maps. Short for "To Get to the Other Side". One of the maps was inspired by the game show Takeshi's Castle.
