= Simon Collins-Laflamme =

Canadian video game developer and businessman

- Other name: hypixel
- Occupations: Video game developer, businessman
- Known for: Co-founding Hypixel and Hypixel Studios; Hytale

Simon Collins-Laflamme is a French-Canadian video game developer and businessman. He co-founded the Hypixel server network for Minecraft, recognised by Guinness World Records in 2017 as the most popular Minecraft server network, and Hypixel Studios, the developer of the sandbox game Hytale. After Riot Games cancelled Hytale in June 2025, Collins-Laflamme bought the game back from the company and returned to lead its development, releasing it in early access in January 2026.

== Career ==
=== Hypixel ===
Collins-Laflamme, known online by his Minecraft username "hypixel", created Minecraft adventure maps with Philippe Touchette before the pair launched the Hypixel server in 2013 to host their maps and minigames. The server grew into one of the largest Minecraft communities, and in 2017 Guinness World Records recognised it as the most popular Minecraft server network, with 64,533 people playing concurrently that July, as well as the most popular independently operated server for any video game. By August 2017 nearly twelve million unique accounts had logged into the server, which at the time ran 43 separate games, including Bed Wars and SkyWars. In April 2020, Collins-Laflamme said the server had passed 18 million unique players.

=== Hypixel Studios and Hytale ===
In 2015, Collins-Laflamme and members of the Hypixel server team began developing Hytale, a sandbox game combining block-based building with role-playing elements. The work was spun off into Hypixel Studios, a separate company from Hypixel Inc., and the game was announced publicly on 13 December 2018 alongside an investment of several million dollars led by Riot Games, with an advisory group that included Dennis Fong, Rob Pardo and Peter Levin. Collins-Laflamme later said he had turned down "way more money" from a different company before partnering with Riot, and that the studio had been spending up to US$400,000 a month on development before its sale.

Riot Games acquired Hypixel Studios outright in April 2020, around the time the studio established a permanent office in Derry, Northern Ireland. More than 2.5 million people had signed up for the game's beta by the time of the acquisition. Development of Hytale under Riot was led by Aaron Donaghey, and Collins-Laflamme was not involved with the studio in its later years; the company later stated that its original founders had not been involved with the project since 2020.

=== Reacquisition of Hytale ===
Riot cancelled Hytale on 23 June 2025 after ten years of development and began shutting down Hypixel Studios. Within a week, Collins-Laflamme said he would approach Riot about buying the game back. The following month he outlined plans to release a "barebones" version of the game quickly and fund further development from early access sales, saying he was prepared to spend "one or two mil max" of his own money before release. In August 2025 he said he was in active negotiations with Riot, after offering what he called "10x what the true market value is", and on 17 November 2025 he announced that he had reacquired the game. The revived studio rehired more than 30 developers, with more planned. Collins-Laflamme and co-founder Philippe Touchette fund the studio personally, with a stated ten-year funding commitment and no external investors.

Collins-Laflamme priced the early access release at US$20, saying that charging more "didn't feel right" because the game was not yet good, declined to launch it on Steam in its unfinished state, and told players not to pre-order if they were uncomfortable doing so. Hytale entered early access on 13 January 2026 and passed one million players shortly after launch, and Collins-Laflamme said shortly before launch that pre-orders alone had funded the studio's roughly 50-person team for the next two years of development. He later described salvaging the game as "a damn miracle", saying it had been "barely playable" when recovered and that the team got it into a playable state within weeks. Riot Games publicly congratulated the studio on the launch. When Minecraft's creative lead Jens Bergensten said after playing the release that he would rather keep playing Minecraft, Collins-Laflamme replied that Bergensten was "probably right to feel this way". He said he had no regrets about buying the game back, calling the effort "the most challenging but rewarding experience of my life". In July 2026 he previewed the game's first major content expansion, Chapter 1, estimating a release within two to three months.
