= Grian (YouTuber) =

British YouTuber

- Occupation: YouTuber

YouTube information
- Channel: Grian
- Years active: 2014–present
- Genre: Gaming
- Subscribers: 8.92M subscribers
- Views: 2.871 Billion views
- Grian's voice (2025) Grian talking with his teammates during the pre-game of MC Championship – Mash Up on 15 November 2025
- Last updated: 12 November 2026

Grian is a British YouTuber primarily and creator of Minecraft videos, commonly centered around building. He co-founded Wynncraft, the largest massively multiplayer online role-playing game (MMORPG) within Minecraft. He is a member of the Hermitcraft server and the founder of the Life Series. As of November 2026, his main channel has about 8.9 million subscribers and about 2.8 billion views.

== Career ==
Grian created his YouTube channel on 23 November 2009.

Grian, alongside Jumla and Salted, founded Wynncraft, a fantasy massively multiplayer online role-playing game (MMORPG), initially released on 29 April 2013. Wynncraft received generally positive reviews. On 4 July 2017, Guinness World Records recognized Wynncraft as the largest MMORPG created within Minecraft.

Grian made an appearance at Minecon 2016 on a panel that discussed the video making process. Grian's video style has been praised for successful teaching methods, such as his video titled "5 Easy Steps to Improve Your Minecraft House" (uploaded on 22 July 2015).

Grian joined Hermitcraft, a private, invite-only Minecraft server, in 2018. He has since co-hosted events for Hermitcraft's collaborations with charities such as the Gamers Outreach Foundation, the Make-a-Wish Foundation, and SOS Africa.

In April 2021, Grian launched 3rd Life, a collaborative Minecraft series featuring 13 other YouTubers. He described the series as "experimental hardcore with a twist." The success of 3rd Life led to the creation of multiple following seasons, such as Last Life, Double Life, Limited Life, Secret Life, Wild Life, Past Life, and most recently as of November 2026, Final Life, with the series now having a total of 18 members, including Grian.

Grian is a regular contestant of MC Championship, one of the biggest Minecraft competitive tournaments which began in 2019. Grian and his team won the 17th MC Championship in September 2021 as well as the Copper Crown MC Championship in October 2025.

In July 2022, Xbox collaborated with the National Trust to recreate Corfe Castle in Minecraft. The build, created by Grian with the help of archaeologist Martin Papworth, was launched ahead of the National Trust's Festival of Archaeology.
