= XChocoBars =

Canadian Twitch streamer (born 1994)

xChocoBars
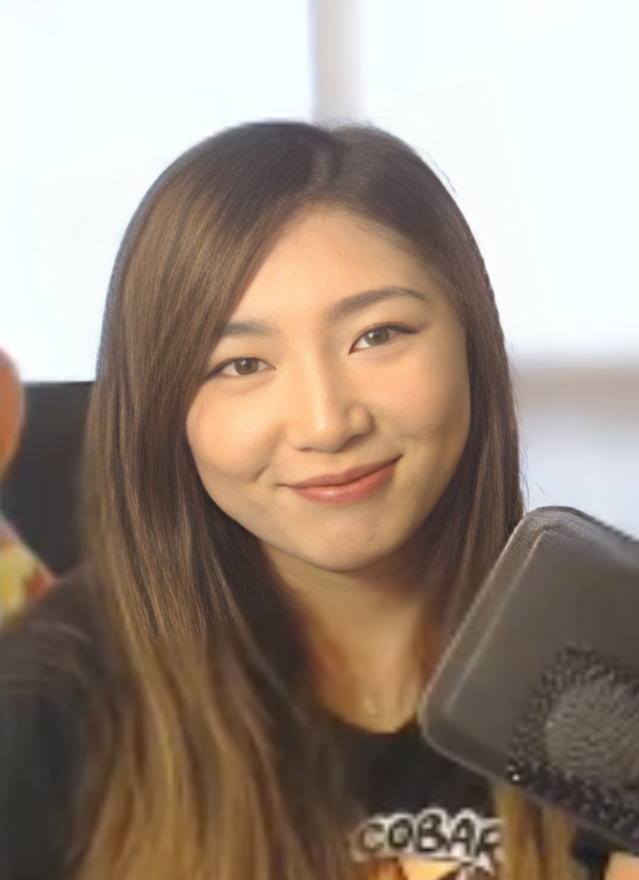
- Xu in 2018
- Born: Janet Rose Xu; 5 November 1994 (age 31); Toronto, Ontario, Canada
- Occupations: Internet personality; Twitch streamer

Twitch information
- Channel: xChocoBars
- Years active: 2015–present
- Genre: Gaming
- Games: League of Legends; Fortnite; Teamfight Tactics; Valorant; Minecraft; Among Us
- Followers: 1 million

YouTube information
- Channel: xChocoBars
- Subscribers: 329 thousand
- Views: 111.08 million
- Last updated: March 30, 2025

Janet Rose Xu (born November 5, 1994), better known as xChocoBars, is a Canadian Internet personality and Twitch streamer.

== Career ==
Xu started livestreaming on Twitch in May 2013 and creating videos on YouTube in November 2013. In her early years, she was most well known for her gameplay and commentary on League of Legends, Fortnite, and Teamfight Tactics. Her fans are affectionately called the Potato Army.

In 2018, Xu was one of the four captains of a $100,000 League of Legends esports charity tournament alongside Pokimane, LilyPichu, and KayPea. Xu played Fortnite with NBA player Josh Hart in IGN's Fortnite Streamer Showdown later that year.

Xu has also taken part in professional esports. In 2019, she won first place at Twitch Rivals: League of Legends tournament as part of team EZ Clap. She went on to participate in ESPN’s inaugural Apex Legends EXP Pro-Am tournament.

She was a finalist for the Twitch Streamer of the Year award at the 11th Shorty Awards.

In 2020, Xu began to stream and post videos of her playing Among Us with many other streamers and celebrities, including Steven Suptic, Valkyrae, Disguised Toast, Dakotaz, Hafu, Sykkuno, Corpse Husband, Pokimane, Bretman Rock, and more.

She has also made Minecraft content, and has participated in Minecraft tournament MC Championship six times since June 2023. Other competitors include Steven Suptic, blaustoise and Smajor1995.

== Personal life ==
Xu was born in Toronto, Canada. She was studying to obtain an early childhood education degree when she dropped out to pursue streaming full-time. Xu formerly lived with other streamers, Pokimane, Valkyrae, and Starsmitten, from mid-2020 to June 2021.

In 2020, Xu publicly spoke out about her experience dealing with a severe stalker for over two years. "I often think about how I will prob die by the hands of my stalker and no one can do anything about it until it really happens," she tweeted. "I know it’s heavy to talk about but if it does happen I hope my death will mean something and help protect other creators from similar situations."

== Awards and nominations ==
Year	Ceremony	Category	Result	Ref.
2019	11th Shorty Awards	Twitch Streamer of the Year	Nominated	
