= KayPea =

Canadian content creator and streamer

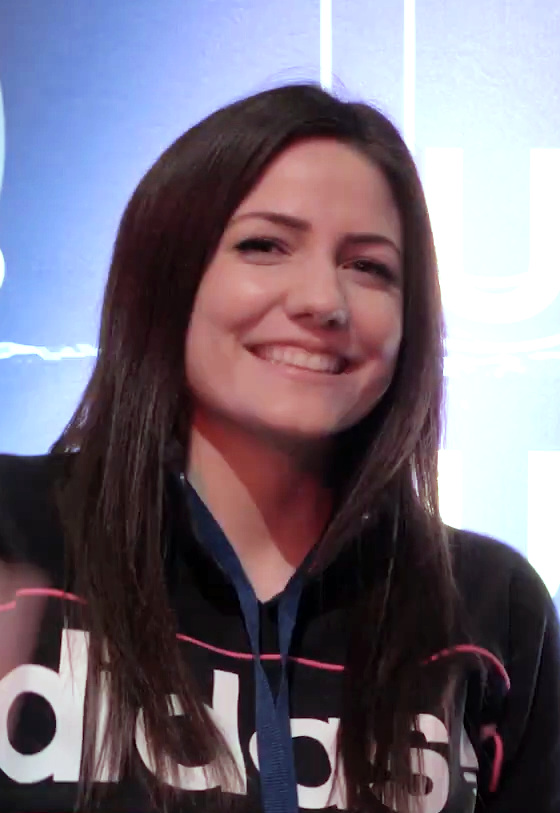
- Pelling in 2019
- Born: Kelsie Pelling; 1990 or 1991 (age 35–36); Vancouver, British Columbia, Canada
- Occupations: Internet personality; Twitch streamer

Twitch information
- Channel: KayPea
- Years active: 2013–present
- Genre: Gaming
- Game: League of Legends

YouTube information
- Channel: KPlol
- Subscribers: 596,000
- Views: 122 million
- Last updated: January 1, 2025

Kelsie Pelling, better known by the handle KayPea or KayPeaLol, is a Canadian content creator and streamer known for playing League of Legends on Twitch and YouTube.

== Early life ==
Pelling was born in Vancouver, British Columbia. She moved to Singapore with her family when she was eight years old and later moved to North Carolina at age 15 when her parents divorced. After living in North Carolina for a year, she moved back to Vancouver. She has a Bachelor of Arts, majoring in Anthropology, and played basketball while in college.

== Career ==
Pelling began streaming League of Legends in 2013 while in university. She began streaming professionally around 2014 and joined the Twitch partner program in 2015.

In 2018, Pelling was one of four team captains (alongside Pokimane, LilyPichu, and xChocoBars) for a League Of Legends tournament called “Gift The Rift” that raised money for British Columbia SPCA, St. Jude Children's Research Hospital, Hope for Justice, and Last Chance for Animals. Later that year, she co-hosted ELEAGUE’s Esports 101: League of Legends, a show about League of Legends on TBS.

== Personal life ==
As of 2022, Pelling lives in Toronto. She has two cats, Luna and Ronin. In 2022, she became engaged to fellow League of Legends player, Lucas “Santorin” Kilmer.
