= Hytale =

Video game

- Developer: Hypixel Studios
- Publisher: Hypixel Studios
- Directors: Simon Collins-Laflamme; Philippe Touchette; Kevin Carstens; Patrick Derbic
- Composer: Oscar Garvin
- Platforms: Linux; macOS; Windows
- Release: Early access 13 January 2026
- Genres: Sandbox, role-playing, action-adventure
- Modes: Single-player, multiplayer

Hytale is a sandbox game developed and published by Canadian-Irish developer Hypixel Studios for Windows, macOS, and Linux. Set in the procedurally generated world of Orbis, it combines block-based construction with RPG-style combat and exploration, alongside support for community servers and server-side modding.

Development began in 2015 among members of Hypixel's Minecraft server team, with funding from Riot Games, which purchased the studio in 2020. The game was cancelled by Riot in June 2025 and repurchased in November 2025 by its original creator, Simon Collins-Laflamme, who resumed development. Hytale was released in early access on 13 January 2026 to positive reception, surpassing one million players shortly after launch, and has since received regular updates. Its first major content expansion, Chapter 1, was previewed in July 2026.

== Gameplay ==
Hytale is set in a fantasy world composed of procedurally generated blocks of numerous shapes arranged in a three-dimensional grid, featuring different biomes, creatures, and dungeons. Players can take part in minigames similar to those found on the Hypixel server, and can build and share mods and custom content using a set of browser-based and in-game tools.

As of July 2026, the game offers two modes: Exploration Mode, a survival-oriented mode built around resource gathering, combat, and building, and Creative Mode, which provides unlimited resources, flight, and world-editing tools; a story-driven Adventure Mode remains in development. The game world, called Orbis, is divided into procedurally generated regions known as "zones", each with its own biomes, mobs, and non-player character factions such as the Kweebec and the Trork; difficulty and rewards increase as players progress into later zones. Four zones are available as of July 2026, with additional zones planned. Adventure content features RPG-styled combat based on distinct weapon families, blocking, and charged attacks, as well as dungeons containing loot and boss rooms. Block-based construction is complemented by an in-game asset editor that allows worlds and assets to be edited live, and by cinematic tools for machinima creation. Modding operates server-side: custom content is delivered through Java plugins and asset packs hosted by the server, allowing players to join modded servers without installing client-side mods. A visual scripting system is planned to let players create or edit content without extensive programming knowledge, alongside a dedicated Blockbench plugin for modelling and animating custom assets. The game's licence permits players to distribute and monetise their mods independently, while prohibiting redistribution of the game's own files. The game supports community-run servers, which players can browse through an in-game server list.

Gameplay screenshot showing the player using a weapon to block an attack from an undead enemy

== Development ==
Development of Hytale began in early 2015. The client is written in C# and the server technology in Java. An alternative engine was built in C++ from 2022, but was ultimately abandoned. The game's soundtrack was composed by Oscar Garvin, with each zone given a distinct set of music to establish its atmosphere. Development was led by Aaron "Noxy" Donaghey of Hypixel Studios, a Canadian-Irish indie game studio of over forty employees that split off from Hypixel Inc., the company behind the Hypixel server in Minecraft. The idea for Hytale arose after 2014 changes to Mojang's end-user license agreement blocked servers from selling micro-transactions that affected gameplay, causing an 85% drop in the Hypixel server's revenue. The team originally wanted to avoid making a voxel-based game, but decided to do so given its experience with the genre.

Hypixel Studios was at first self-financed with revenue generated by the Hypixel server. It subsequently received an investment of several million dollars led by Riot Games, along with an advisory group that included businessmen Dennis Fong, Rob Pardo, and Peter Levin. Collins-Laflamme later said the studio had been spending up to US$400,000 a month on development prior to the buyout. The studio was fully acquired by Riot Games in April 2020. On 9 December 2018, the studio teased the game to the Hypixel server's community with a forum post and a countdown timer on the Hytale website. Hytale was announced publicly on 13 December 2018, with the trailer amassing over 31 million views within a month.

Hytale, originally intended to be playable in 2021, was delayed several times as its scope grew, with former developers later criticising the project's "unrealistic ambitions". In July 2024, the developers reported that the game was being migrated to a new engine.

=== Cancellation and revival ===
On 23 June 2025, after ten years of development, Donaghey announced the game's cancellation and the closure of Hypixel Studios, citing its overly ambitious scope. Collins-Laflamme, the studio's co-founder, said at the end of June that he would approach Riot Games about buying the game back, and on 13 August announced that he was in active negotiations to acquire it.

Following the cancellation, Anego Studios, the developer of the sandbox survival game Vintage Story, announced its intention to create an adventure mode inspired by Hytale. This was later revealed as Project Glint, a standalone game created by former Hypixel Studios developers hired by Anego.

On 17 November 2025, Collins-Laflamme announced that he had reacquired Hytale from Riot Games. The game's website was relaunched alongside a post titled "Hytale is saved!", which stated that 30 developers had been rehired, with further hiring planned. A 16-minute video of "raw" gameplay from the legacy engine was released to YouTube the following day; despite the newer engine's abandonment, cross-platform support remained planned.

=== Early access release ===
Hytale entered early access on 13 January 2026 for Windows, macOS, and Linux, launching with Exploration and Creative modes as well as modding support. Collins-Laflamme said the game would not initially be published on Steam, citing its unfinished state. Pre-purchases opened on 13 December 2025, a week after account creation began. The game was sold in three editions: Standard, "Supporter", and "Cursebreaker (Founder's Edition)", with the base edition priced at US$20. Collins-Laflamme later stated that pre-purchase revenue had funded at least the next two years of development. The game surpassed one million players shortly after launch despite early server strain, and briefly became the most-watched game on Twitch, attracting more than 420,000 viewers. User-created mods emerged shortly after the game's early access release.

=== Post-release updates ===
The game's first update, released on 17 January 2026, added content including dinosaurs; further updates and hotfixes followed in the subsequent weeks. Updates settled into a cadence of weekly pre-release patches bundled into stable releases every two to six weeks, and were initially focused on bug fixes and foundational work. Update 5, released on 26 May 2026, added first-iteration game controller support, an in-game server browser for community servers, a friends list with Discord integration, and a "Trigger Volume" tool for scripting encounters without code.

The Hytale New Worlds Modding Contest, the game's first official modding competition, was launched by Hypixel Studios and CurseForge in March 2026, offering US$100,000 in prizes across three categories; the winners were announced in May. At the time of the contest's announcement, players had created more than 5,000 mods for the game, which had been downloaded over 20 million times on CurseForge. In June 2026, the studio announced "Hytale Shared Source", a programme releasing the game's full server source code, network protocol, and assets on GitHub to licensed players, with access modelled on Epic Games' Unreal Engine source programme.

Alongside these updates, work began on "chapters", larger content releases intended to advance the game's Cursebreaker storyline in Exploration mode. The first of these, Chapter 1, was previewed by Collins-Laflamme on 16 July 2026; he estimated it would be released within two to three months. Centred on the game's goblin faction, the expansion is planned to add the game's first handcrafted dungeon with a multi-stage boss fight, an ability system based on combining runes, gadgets, boats, and a set of party minigames, the game's first official mode beyond Exploration and Creative. "Chapter 1: Out of the Breach" was ultimately released later, on October 12, fulfilling these promises. Collins-Laflamme said development since the reacquisition had prioritised rebuilding tools and foundations over new content, as the team had resumed work from a build over four years old.

== Reception ==
=== Early access ===
Hytale's early access release was well received by critics, who positively compared it to Minecraft. PC Gamer wrote that, despite Collins-Laflamme saying Hytale "isn't good yet", it "already feels pretty good", praising the release's gameplay, variety of biomes, and non-player characters. Eurogamer called it "already enjoyable", highlighting its variety of mechanics and environments. In its review, IGN generally praised the release's gameplay, controls, and variety, but criticised its general lack of direction.

Minecraft's creative lead Jens Bergensten said the two games should be more different and that he would "rather just play Minecraft", while calling Hytale "very polished" and expressing interest in playing it in the future.

=== Awards ===
| Year | Award | Category | Result | Ref. |
|---|---|---|---|---|
| 2019 | Golden Joystick Awards | Most Wanted Game | Nominated | |
| 2021 | Northern Ireland Game Awards | Most Anticipated | Won | |

== See also ==
- Cube World
- Luanti
- Terraria
- Trove
