= Vintage Story =

2016 video game

- Developer: Anego Studios
- Programmer: Tyron Madlener
- Artists: Irena Madlener; Anna Baldur; Redram
- Writer: Luke Jeffrey
- Composer: Hayden Davenport
- Platforms: Windows, macOS, Linux
- Release: September 27, 2016
- Genre: Survival
- Modes: Single-player, multiplayer

Vintage Story is a sandbox survival game developed and published by Anego Studios. The game began development on April 5, 2016, by the founders of Anego Studios, Tyron and Irena Madlener. The game became available for owners of a "game key" on September 4, 2016, then became publicly available for sale on September 27, 2016. An old version of the game is available for free download. The game is in early access and can be played in singleplayer or multiplayer modes.

== Gameplay ==
Clay bowls are sculpted by placing voxels. The level of the blue gear on the HUD represents the player's temporal stability.

In Vintage Story the player character (a tall humanoid referred to as a "seraph") inhabits a voxel-based open world landscape. Seraphs are controlled from a first- or third-person perspective. By default, worlds are procedurally generated and simulate a variety of biomes, rock strata, and landforms through 27-day meteorological seasons. The distribution and types of flora and fauna are affected by the local climate, which generally increases in temperature towards the world's equator.

Gameplay in Vintage Story is partially customisable – world generation, survival difficulty, and story content can be adjusted for different play styles, such as for creative building. In the standard survival mode, seraphs must maintain their health and "temporal stability" initially by hunting, foraging, crafting items, and establishing shelters. Other creatures include animals, travelling merchants, and hostile eldritch horror entities that spawn from temporal stability-draining "rifts".

Progression through the Metal Ages involves reproducing real ancient techniques – examples include firing pottery in a pit kiln, prospecting for and collecting loose native copper for smelting, forging ingots into tools on an anvil, and refining iron into steel using a cementation furnace. Notably, the creation of some items must be done through interaction with the game world. For example, players must form tool molds by physically placing voxels of clay on the ground in the appropriate pattern.

Building structures and sculptures is another element of Vintage Story: chisels can be used to subdivide and add to or remove material from blocks. Additional activities include animal husbandry, brewing, and harnessing mechanical power.

== Development ==
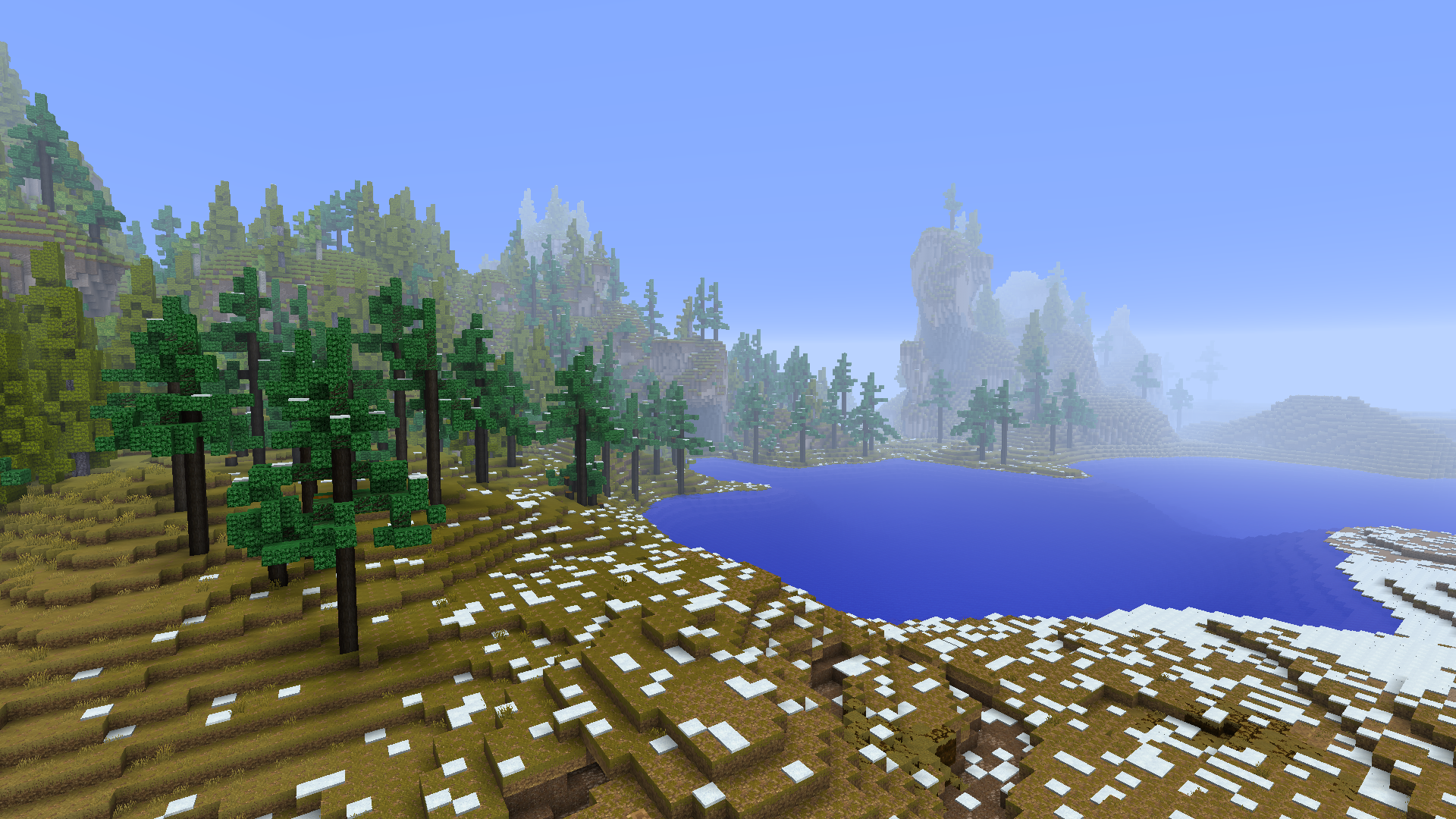
Vintage Story was based on the fan-made Minecraft mod Vintagecraft (pictured).

Vintage Story began as a standalone version of an earlier Minecraft mod called Vintagecraft that was created by Tyron Madlener. While initially bootstrapped using the public-domain ManicDigger voxel game, the game engine was subsequently extensively rewritten in C# and OpenTK; Anego Studios describes Vintage Story as using its own cross-platform engine. Most of the game's programming was done by Tyron Madlener, with contributions from several others. A majority of the game's code is under a source-available license on the Anego Studios GitHub. Development on updates with additional features and story elements for the game is ongoing, with the latest stable version, 1.22.7 being released to the public.

A notable feature of the game is its modding API, which has been praised for its flexibility and quality.

In 2025, following the cancellation (but before the revival) of Hytale, an adventure mode inspired by the cancelled game was announced to be in development, to be created by former Hypixel Studios developers hired by Anego Studios (eventually announced as a standalone game codenamed Project Glint).

== Reception ==
Power Up Gaming described Vintage Story as being "on a completely different level" than other block-based survival games due to its approach to crafting and inventory management, noting that the game fixes all the "nagging problems that everyone has" in other open-world survival block-based games by allowing the player to open multiple menus at the same time and interact with items more naturally. A critic found the content of Vintage Story to be a more atmospheric survival experience compared to Minecraft which he considered "too tame".

Rock Paper Shotgun praised the world generation, animations, and modding. In another review Rock Paper Shotgun mostly focused on the much better performance of Vintage Story, compared to Minecraft. A review by Sportskeeda praised the graphics, as well as the mineralogy. Digital Trends heralded the unique gameplay and crafting system for their quality, as well as the flexibility of the game.
