= Technoblade =

American internet personality (1999–2022)

- Technoblade in 2020, at his father's wedding
- Born: Alexander; June 1, 1999
- Died: June 2022 (aged 23) (Note: Technoblade's death was announced on June 30, 2022. While one source reported that he died on that day, several others only reported that his death was announced on that date.)
- Cause of death: Metastatic sarcoma (Note: While some sources reported that Technoblade died of sarcoma, others did not specify the type of cancer he died of.)
- Other name: Technothepig
- Education: University of Iowa (dropped out)
- Occupation: YouTuber
- Years active: 2013–2022 (Note: Years active only include the years when Technoblade himself was uploading content to the Technoblade YouTube channel.)
- Known for: Hypixel; Dream SMP; MC Championship; Minecraft Monday

YouTube information
- Channel: Technoblade
- Genre: Gaming
- Subscribers: 23.2 million (Note: Subscriber and view counts do not include any secondary or tertiary channels.)
- Views: 2.16 billion
- Technoblade's voice (2019) Alexander playing on the Hypixel multiplayer server with a private party (Note: The Hypixel server allows multiple players to join a game lobby together as a group/party. In some cases, parties can create a private game lobby where the players in the private party are the only players in the game lobby.)
- Last updated: October 9, 2026
- Website: technoblade.com

Alexander (June 1, 1999 – June 2022), known online as Technoblade (/ˈtɛk.noʊˌbleɪd/ TEK-noh-blayd), was an American YouTuber known for his Minecraft videos, livestreams, and involvement in the Dream SMP. Technoblade registered his main channel on YouTube in 2013. His videos consisted primarily of Minecraft gameplay, particularly on the minigame server Hypixel. After rising to popularity in 2019 for his performances in player versus player (PvP) events, Technoblade was invited to the Dream SMP Minecraft server in 2020, further increasing his following.

In August 2021, Technoblade announced his diagnosis with cancer. Following unsuccessful treatment attempts, Technoblade died from metastatic sarcoma in June 2022, which prompted widespread reactions across both the Minecraft and YouTube communities. Around that time, his YouTube channel had reached nearly 11 million subscribers.

== Internet career ==
Technoblade first registered and began uploading on his main YouTube channel on October 28, 2013. Its content focused mainly on the video game Minecraft, particularly gameplay on the minigame server Hypixel. In a video from 2017, Technoblade beat Minecraft on hardcore mode using a racing wheel controller. In another series of videos, beginning with "The Great Potato War" from 2019, he tried to produce the highest number of potatoes in the Hypixel gamemode SkyBlock, competing against rival im_a_squid_kid.

Technoblade rose in popularity in 2019, following multiple wins in Keemstar's "Minecraft Monday" tournaments in which he defeated multiple prominent content creators in combat. Technoblade also regularly participated in the MC Championships (MCC) tournaments with other YouTubers and won two of them. According to Cale Michael of Dot Esports, Technoblade was widely regarded as among the best Minecraft content creators, especially in player versus player (PvP) events.

Technoblade's YouTube icon

Technoblade became a member of the Dream SMP in 2020, a Minecraft server hosted by the YouTuber Dream, which features numerous popular Minecraft YouTubers. He began frequently creating content and livestreams on the server. Technoblade had a friendly rivalry with Dream, and they were both generally regarded as among the best Minecraft players. As part of this rivalry, MrBeast hosted a series of player versus player duels between Dream and Technoblade with a $100,000 prize, which Technoblade won.

In September 2021, Technoblade raised over $300,000 for the Sarcoma Foundation of America through a charity livestream, passing the $250,000 goal within two hours.

Around the time of his death in June 2022, Technoblade's channel had 10.8 million subscribers. It posthumously reached 15 million subscribers in August 2022, then 20 million in May 2025.

== Personal life ==
Born on June 1, 1999, Technoblade resided in San Francisco, California. In a 2018 video, he revealed he would begin attending college as an English major. However, in a later 2019 video, he announced that he dropped out of college to play Minecraft full-time. The Daily Iowan later reported that Technoblade had attended the University of Iowa to study creative writing from 2018 to 2019. Technoblade was also known to have had ADHD, and was an atheist.

Throughout his career, Technoblade avoided personal inquiries and interviews to maintain his and his family's privacy, although he occasionally discussed his personal life in his videos. His family continued to decline interviews after his death. By his own admission, Technoblade and a sibling deceived his viewers in a now-deleted video from 2016 into believing his name was "Dave". This was generally accepted as his real name until the announcement of his death, in which he revealed his name was Alexander.

== Cancer diagnosis and death ==
External videos
- where i've been An announcement of Technoblade's cancer prognosis, released on August 27, 2021.
- I Almost Became An Amputee; An update to Technoblade's cancer situation, released on December 23, 2021.
- so long nerds The announcement of Technoblade's death, released on June 30, 2022.

In a video released on August 27, 2021, Technoblade disclosed that he had been diagnosed with cancer after noticing pain in his right arm and swelling on his shoulder. Chemotherapy and radiation therapy proved unsuccessful. His oncologist stated that his arm would potentially need to be amputated, and Technoblade advised his viewers to wear face masks and become vaccinated against COVID-19, as it was relevant to his immunodeficiency at the time. In response to the diagnosis, Dream donated $21,409 to cancer research, and Technoblade hosted a charity livestream later in September 2021. In December 2021, he underwent a successful limb salvage operation.

On June 30, 2022, at 9:29 PM EDT, a video titled "so long nerds" was uploaded to Technoblade's YouTube channel, in which his father announced that Technoblade had died from the cancer. Technoblade's father read a message written by Technoblade eight hours before he died and said that future proceeds from merchandising and videos would go to the Sarcoma Foundation of America and his siblings' college educations. The video ended with a written message from Technoblade's mother. Technoblade had planned to script and present the video himself, but his declining health prevented him from doing so. It was also planned that the video would include the song "Exitlude" by The Killers, but was left out due to potential copyright concerns.

Although Technoblade never specified the type of his cancer, he had previously raised $500,000 for the Sarcoma Foundation of America throughout his YouTube career. Several publications reported that Technoblade had died of metastatic sarcoma, and the Foundation acknowledged in a press release that Technoblade had been diagnosed with sarcoma.

On September 20, 2022, the Sarcoma Foundation of America stated in a press release that Technoblade was diagnosed with an unspecified type of stage 4 sarcoma when the lump on his shoulder was examined, and "chest scans revealed metastasis to both lungs".

=== Reactions and tributes ===
The announcement of his death became the top trending video on YouTube shortly after it was published and became a trending topic on Twitter. It remained on YouTube's trending tab for several days and surpassed 30 million views in the first 24 hours. By the end of August 2022, it had been viewed over 80 million times and liked over 8 million times, making it the most viewed and liked video on Technoblade's channel. The video was recognized as the top trending video on YouTube in 2022, with 87 million views. YouTube themselves added an Easter egg to the search function on their website, where searching "Technoblade" would display a "Did you mean" prompt with "Technoblade never dies".

YouTubers such as Dream and other members of the Dream SMP expressed their condolences, support, and admiration for him online. Simon Collins-Laflamme, the co-founder of Hypixel, and business magnate Elon Musk expressed similar feelings. YouTube tweeted its condolences to his family, friends, and fans following the release of the video. The official Minecraft Twitter account also tweeted its condolences, and the Sarcoma Foundation of America displayed a bespoke tribute on their website. Polygon described Technoblade as "one of Minecraft's most celebrated personalities."

In an interview with The New York Times, Don Pireso, Hypixel's lead administrator, stated that Technoblade's family would not be providing any further comments regarding his death beyond what they were comfortable sharing in the video. The Hypixel team also established a digital space on its Minecraft server where fans could use the in-game book and quill item to write one-page messages until August 2022. Over 377,000 messages were printed across 22 volumes, which were delivered to Technoblade's family by Hypixel Studios CEO Noxy in November 2022, alongside a volume of fan-made artwork, a fan-made oil painting of Technoblade, and a Technoblade-themed cosplay headpiece.

On September 28, 2022, the Sarcoma Foundation of America presented the SFA Courage Award to Technoblade's family to honor Technoblade's "strength and perseverance in [his] sarcoma diagnosis." A Technoblade artwork appeared in the July 2023 r/place subreddit experiment. In June 2024, Richard Davidson of Sarcoma UK estimated that about £1 million ($1.26 million as of July 2024) had been raised to spread awareness of sarcoma since Technoblade's death.

On September 4, 2026, a feature-length documentary named "Technoblade Never Dies" was announced on YouTube. Riot Games and Hypixel were also announced as being involved.

==== In official Minecraft media ====
On July 2, 2022, Mojang Studios added a tribute to Technoblade in the launcher image of Minecraft: Java Edition. The modified image added a crown to a pig, in reference to Technoblade's in-game Minecraft skin and channel branding. The tribute was removed one month later when the image was replaced to promote Minecraft's Wild Update. After fans had suggested the addition, Mojang added a new splash text—"Technoblade never dies!"—to the Minecraft title screen. In an email to The New York Times, Mojang Studios wrote that Technoblade "became synonymous with a source of good".

In the 2025 film A Minecraft Movie, a pig wearing a crown appears as a tribute to Technoblade. When Henry asks whether the pig is a king, Steve (portrayed by Jack Black) replies, "No. That's a legend." The tribute was suggested by actor Sebastian Hansen, and director Jared Hess agreed to include it in the film.

==== By YouTubers ====
On October 18, 2022, Dream hosted a livestream featuring Technoblade's father, where the two told anecdotes about Technoblade. The livestream raised $47,087 for the Sarcoma Foundation of America within 24 hours.

On October 28, 2022, nine years after the creation of the Technoblade YouTube channel, YouTube uploaded an eight-minute video to its official channel commemorating Technoblade's ninth anniversary entitled "Technoblade Never Dies." YouTube revealed that since his death in June, an average of 300 new videos with the same catchphrase in the title were uploaded daily. On the same day, a video was uploaded by MrBeast which is believed to be the last video that Technoblade participated in.

On June 23, 2023, Dream released his fourth song, "Until I End Up Dead", in memory of Technoblade. He released an alternate video for "Until I End Up Dead", titled "The Duel", also in memory of him on August 26, 2023.

On June 30, 2024, two years after Technoblade's death was announced, a new video edited by TommyInnit was uploaded to the Technoblade YouTube channel with a spoken explanation from TommyInnit:

Two years ago, I recorded a video with Technoblade where one hundred Minecraft YouTubers came together to survive some natural disasters and fight to the death. A few months ago, I realized I didn't actually use much of [his] footage in my video, and after taking a long, long time to track his recording down ... I found out it was actually really entertaining. So I've put together what I think would live up ... to a Technoblade video in Alex's standards.

The video was a montage of previously unused footage from Technoblade's perspective of the Minecraft world's natural disasters. It received nearly three million views within a few hours.
