= VoiceoverPete =

American YouTuber and voice actor

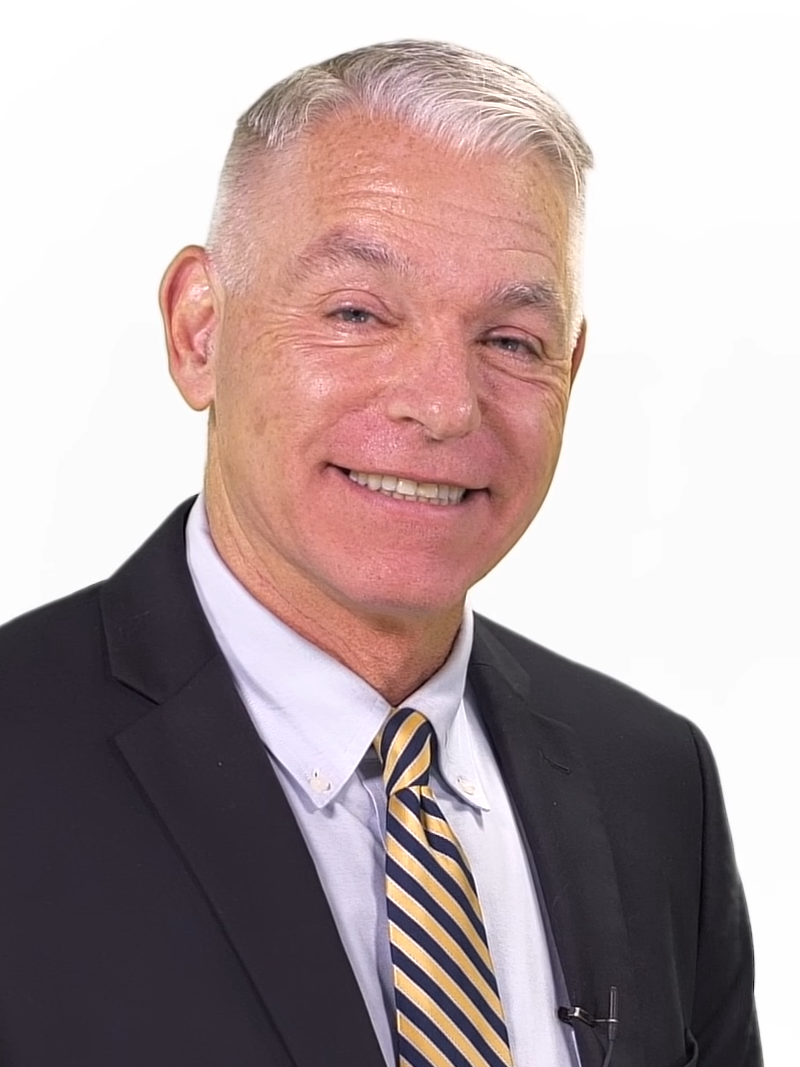
- Accetturo in November 2018
- Born: Pete Accetturo
- Occupations: YouTuber; voice actor; spokesperson; online streamer

YouTube information
- Channel: VoiceoverPete
- Years active: 2011–present
- Genre: Comedy
- Subscribers: 946 thousand
- Views: 27.5 million
- Last updated: October 22, 2025
- Website: voiceoverpete.com

Pete Accetturo, better known by his online alias VoiceoverPete, is an American YouTuber, streamer, voice actor, comedian, and spokesperson.

== Early career ==
Prior to his work on Fiverr, Accetturo was a corporate sales presenter, which provided him with the skills to successfully transition to working as a freelance spokesperson on the platform Fiverr. Accetturo became an "elite-level" content creator on the platform, and co-hosted several Fiverr events.

== Fiverr controversy ==
Accetturo became well known online in October 2018 after producing a video for a customer on Fiverr that satirically urged Fortnite players to send their credit card numbers to save John Wick (a playable character in Fortnite) from a perceived danger. The video went viral, receiving 1 million views on YouTube before it was deleted. He subsequently received over 500 orders to produce similar videos for other games such as Overwatch and was also commissioned by Twitch streamer Ninja to produce a similar video to solicit Twitch subscriptions.

In November 2018, Accetturo was banned from Fiverr without warning, the latter citing the numerous "credit card scam" videos he starred in. As of January 2019, Accetturo said he was still owed "thousands of dollars" by Fiverr. The ban led him to switch to Patreon as a platform for funding while producing content on YouTube and Twitch along with his son, PJ Accetturo, who works as his production manager.

== Political positions ==
Accetturo is an advocate for free speech online. In a YouTube video where he spoke to a crowd of his followers, Accetturo expressed disdain towards tech corporations like Facebook, stating "our data is mined like toilet paper." He is against the European Union directive, Article 13, stating that it would threaten internet freedom and the community surrounding internet memes.

=== Presidential candidacy ===
On April 12, 2019, Accetturo filed with the Federal Election Commission (FEC) under the name Sir Voice Over Pete, running as the candidate for the ACE Party. He had previously announced his bid on February 18, 2019, through a YouTube video.

When asked for the reason behind his presidential bid, he told The Washington Post that he "would like to see a party of common sense" and that he would remove gridlock for two years, "and then we can go back to the inefficiency that we have today." He also stated that he wants to advocate for content creators who are stifled by social media platforms.
