= Skyblock =

Minecraft minigame

In-game render of a starting island in Skyblock

Skyblock is a downloadable world and minigame in the sandbox video game Minecraft. The original world consists of a small island floating in the air, on which a player must survive on with limited resources. It was originally created by a user named Noobcrew, who published the official version of the map to the Minecraft Forum on September 4, 2011.

Being one of the first pieces of user-generated content for Minecraft, Skyblock has become iconic and has been used on various Minecraft servers. It has also inspired various Minecraft mods and maps, as well as derivative game modes for other games.

== Gameplay ==
In the original Skyblock, the player spawns on a tiny L-shaped grassy island suspended in the sky, populated with just one oak tree and a lone chest. The chest contains a limited amount of materials that must be strategically used with the main goal of surviving, expanding the island, completing challenges, obtaining food, and continuing to stay alive. Depending on the version selected, an additional sand island, access to the Nether, or the materials in the chest may differ, which can ultimately change the objectives a player can achieve. There is typically no end goal with Skyblock, however building farms or decorative buildings is a common objective.

== History ==
According to skyblock.net, the original Skyblock website, Skyblock and all of its original versions have been downloaded over 12.3 million times. Since the release of the map, various YouTubers have made videos about the map, which greatly increased its popularity.

Skyblock has its own official Minecraft server. Variations of Skyblock have also been created on several Minecraft servers, such as Hypixel, one of the most popular servers in the game. Hypixel's SkyBlock minigame was released on June 11, 2019. It differs from traditional Skyblock in that players still start out on their own islands, but a lot of the gameplay takes place on public islands which are also floating in the sky.

In November 2019, Noobcrew's company Mineverse LLC applied to register Skyblock as a trademark with the United States Patent and Trademark Office. Microsoft and several Minecraft Marketplace partners opposed the application, and the cases were consolidated before the Trademark Trial and Appeal Board. On May 11, 2026, the board ruled against registration, finding that the term Skyblock was merely descriptive of virtual worlds featuring islands made of blocks in the sky and had not acquired distinctiveness. The following day, the creator removed the download option for the original map from their website in protest, citing the decision to prevent awareness about Skyblock with the subsequent monetization of "Original" skyblock maps on the Marketplace for Minecraft: Bedrock Edition.

== Adaptations ==
Minigames similar to Skyblock have been created in other video games, such as Terraria, Roblox and Fortnite.

Various user-made Skyblock-style maps were created for Terraria. In August 2023, Re-Logic announced in a blog post that an official Skyblock mode would be added as a world seed. The mode was later released on January 27, 2026 as part of version 1.4.5. Lead developer Andrew Spinks stated that he spent significant time refining the seed to ensure it was not "as hardcore and grindy" as community-created versions.
