= TommyInnit =

English internet personality (born 2004)

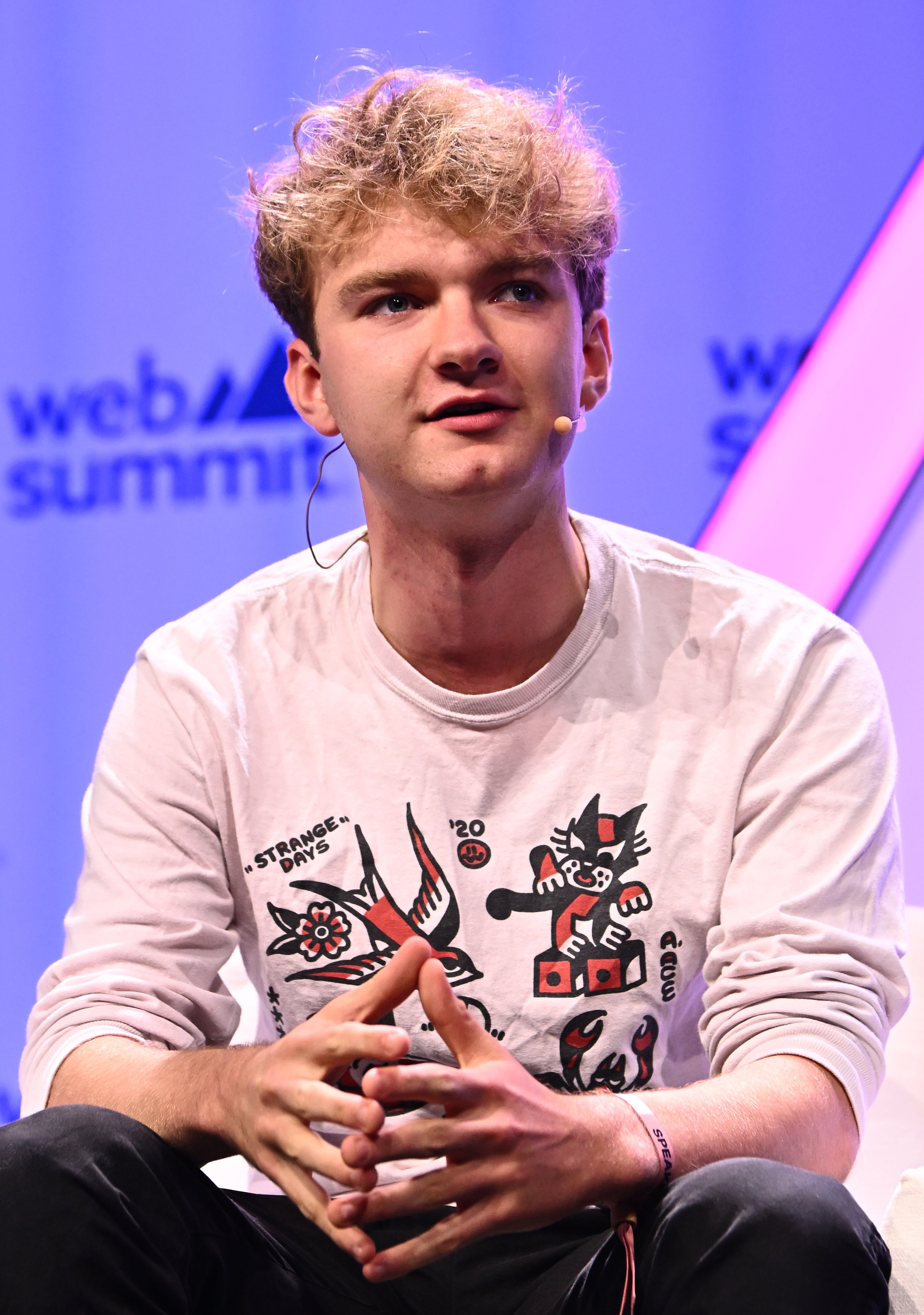
- Simons at Web Summit in 2023
- Born: Thomas Michael Simons; 9 April 2004 (age 22); Nottingham, Nottinghamshire, England
- Other name: Tom Simons
- Education: The Carlton Academy
- Occupations: YouTuber; Twitch streamer; comedian

Twitch information
- Channel: tommyinnit
- Years active: 2018–present
- Genre: Gaming
- Game: Minecraft
- Followers: 7.22 million (main channel); 8.76 million (combined) (Note: Followers, broken down by channel: 7.22 million (tommyinnit) 1.54 million (tommyinnitalt))

YouTube information
- Channel: TommyInnit
- Years active: 2013–present
- Genres: Gaming; vlogging; improv comedy
- Subscribers: 15 million (main channel); 29.38 million (combined) (Note: Subscribers, broken down by channel: 15 million (TommyInnit) 5.2 millions (Tom Simons) 3.37 million (TommyOutit) 2.74 million (TommyVODS) 695 thousand (TommySHORTS) 405 thousand (Channelnutpig) 299 thousand (100 Questions with Tom Simons) 213 thousand (tomaye) 202 thousand (Tom) 66.5 thousand (Black Tiger) 15.6 thousand (TommyCLIPS) 288 thousand (Shut Up I'm Talking) 694 thousand (Sorry) 198 thousand (Very Sorry))
- Views: 2.52 billion (main channel); 4.03 billion (combined) (Note: Views, broken down by channel: 2.662 billion (TommyInnit) 383 millions (Tom Simons) 199 million (TommyOutit) 424 million (TommyVODS) 156 million (TommySHORTS) 7.1 million (Channelnutpig) 38.2 million (100 Questions with Tom Simons) 2.8 million (tomaye) 2.9 million (Tom) 718 thousand (Black Tiger) 1.4 million (TommyCLIPS) 79.2 million (Shut Up I'm Talking) 29.5 million (Sorry) 3.7 million (Very Sorry))
- Last updated: 30 January 2025
- Website: tommyinnit.com

Thomas Michael Simons (born 9 April 2004), better known as TommyInnit (/ˈtɒmiˌɪnɪt/ TOMM-ee-inn-it), is an English YouTuber, Twitch streamer, presenter and comedian. He gained popularity from creating Minecraft-related videos and live streams, including collaborations with fellow YouTubers and streamers in the Dream SMP.

As of 31 August 2026, his 14 YouTube channels have collectively reached over 29.38 million subscribers and over 4.03 billion views; his two Twitch channels have reached over 8.76 million followers, making him the most-followed Minecraft channel on Twitch, as well as the 24th most-followed overall.

== Early life ==
Thomas Michael Simons was born in Nottingham, Nottinghamshire, England on 9 April 2004 to Iain, a former arcade owner and the founder of the GameCity festival, who now works with Thomas, and Sarah Simons, a former actor and current teacher for people with disabilities. Simons grew up in the Mapperley area of Nottingham.

Simons attended The Carlton Academy in Carlton, Nottinghamshire. He said while at school he cheated on some of his mock examinations, and that the COVID-19 pandemic caused these grades to be counted as his official GCSE grades.

== Career ==
Simons created his first YouTube channel, Channelnutpig, on 15 February 2013 and his TommyInnit channel on 24 December 2015. He uploaded his first video on his TommyInnit channel in September 2018. Simons typically uploads videos of himself playing Minecraft. He began streaming on Twitch in late 2018 and regularly streams Minecraft and Just Chatting.

On 4 July 2020, Simons joined the Dream SMP, a roleplay-focused Minecraft server run by YouTuber Dream.

On 20 January 2021, Simons live streamed the finale of the Dream SMP, titled The Dream SMP Finale, which peaked at over 650,000 viewers, making it the third-highest all-time concurrent viewer livestream on Twitch, overtaking Ninja's Fortnite collaboration with Drake. His streaming ventures would then earn him two Guinness World Records, with the help of content creator Jack Massey Welsh, for "most viewers of a Minecraft gameplay live stream on Twitch" and "most followed Minecraft channel on Twitch".

In 2023, Simons, along with fellow Twitch streamers and YouTubers Wilbur Soot, Philza, Slimecicle, and Ranboo, started a new comedy group YouTube channel called Sorry (also known as The Sorry Boys). The group officially went on an indefinite hiatus in March 2024, without any particular reason stated apart from "current circumstances". In the days leading up to the hiatus, Wilbur Soot had been involved in allegations of misconduct.

In 2025, Simons transitioned from Minecraft-focused content to personal videos and co-hosted the podcast Shut Up I'm Talking with fellow content creator Jack Manifold. In early 2026, he expressed interest in returning to Minecraft content and was announced to be competing in MC Championship: Spell Bound shortly thereafter, marking his first appearance in the event in nearly two years.

In April 2026, Simons began his new series 100 Questions with Tom Simons where he interviews guests with 100 questions or less before the interview ends. It is the first original digital channel produced by Sony Pictures Television's digital studio initiative. Notable guests include Stephen Fry, Robert Webb, and physicist Brian Cox.

=== Podcasting ===
In September 2024, Simons began presenting the Shut Up I'm Talking podcast alongside frequent collaborator Jack Manifold.

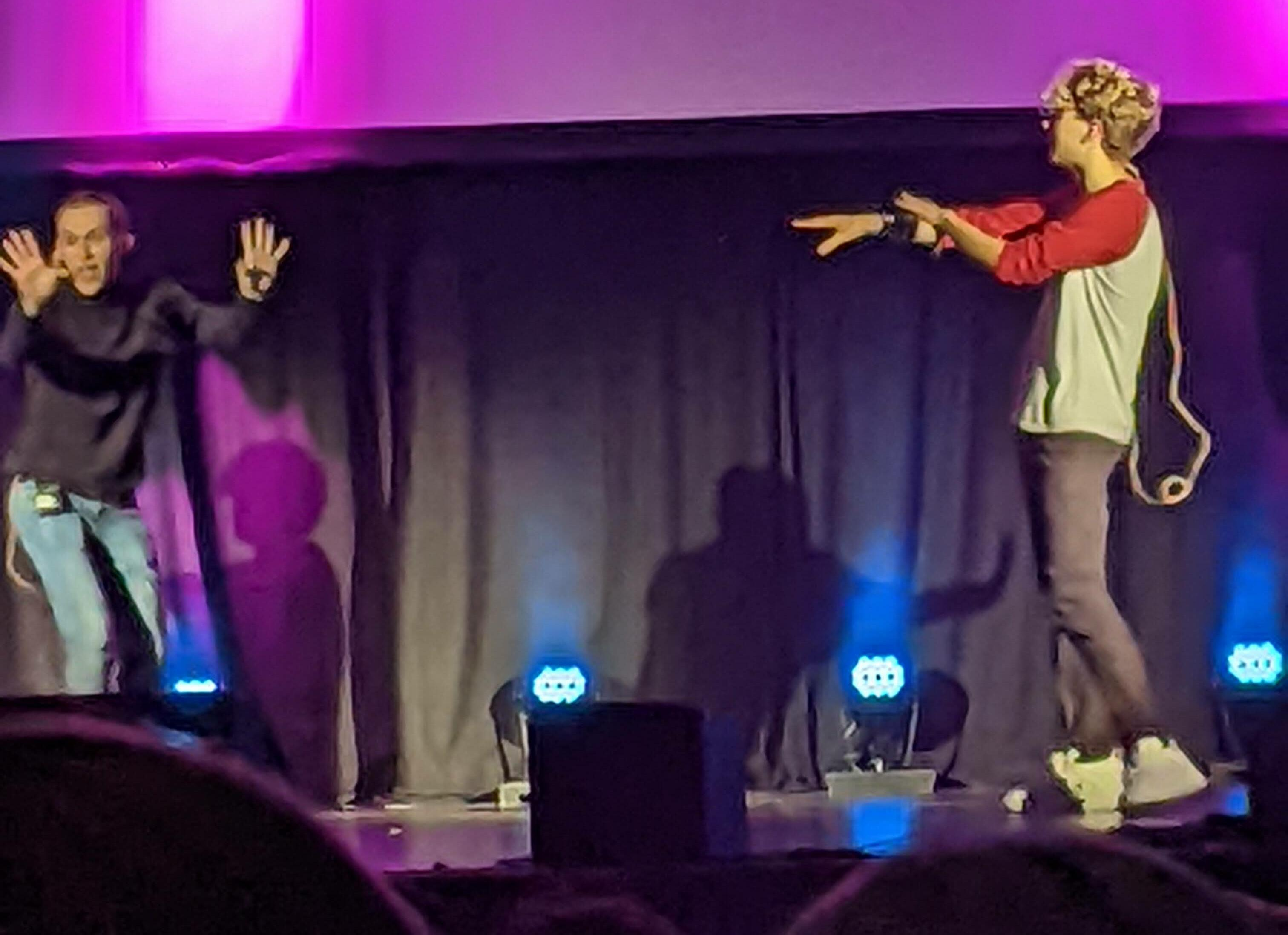
Simons (right) and regular collaborator Jack Manifold (left) at the TommyInnit & Friends live show in 2022

=== Live shows ===
On 1 July 2022, Simons performed a live special at the Brighton Dome, titled TommyInnit & Friends. The show included many other popular internet personalities, including DanTDM, Jacksepticeye, Jack Manifold, Nihachu, Owen Harder, and others, as well as a tribute to Technoblade, whose death was announced early the same day. (Note: This is based on British Summer Time (BST), the timezone the United Kingdom (where the live show occurred) was observing when the announcement of Technoblade's death, and Simons' live show, happened. Technoblade's death was announced at 2:29 am BST on 1 July 2022, and Simons' live show was performed from 7:30 pm the same day.)

Simons revealed in 2024 that after performing TommyInnit & Friends, he felt drawn to live performance. Soon after, he began doing United Kingdom and United States tours as well as speaking to comedians and being mentored by Daniel Sloss. As well as this, he began doing open mics and started getting more into stand-up comedy, beginning to pursue a career into comedy.

From 7 June to 24 June 2023, Simons performed a live show across the United Kingdom, titled TommyInnit: Annoying at First, with fellow content creators JackManifoldTV and Badlinu. On 5 May 2023, Simons held a one-off sketch comedy show at The Old Market in Hove, England.

From 12 March to 25 April 2024, Simons performed TommyInnit: How to Be a Billionaire, a tour across the United States.

On 19 November 2024, Simons announced TommyInnit: The Survival Tour, his first tour as a stand-up comedian. Each show was split into two parts, with Simons performing stand-up comedy in the first part and being interviewed by a guest in the second part. He toured the US, UK and Australia.

=== Books ===
On 4 August 2022, Simons announced a book that he had been writing with Wilbur Soot titled TommyInnit Says... The Quote Book. The book was released on 13 October 2022. All of the sales money from the book is being donated to Sarcoma UK in honour of Simons' and Gold's late friend Technoblade, to whom the book was also dedicated.

On 24 October 2024, Simons announced he would be publishing a satirical self-help book titled TommyInnit's Guide to Survival which was officially released worldwide on 10 April 2025.

=== Television ===
On 19 June 2025, Simons appeared as a guest panellist on a special episode of the British topical debate TV programme Question Time, centred around "the challenges of growing up in the 21st century".

On 28 July 2026, he competed on the twenty-first series of Celebrity MasterChef on the second week of heats.

On 5 September 2026, Simons participated in the Taskmaster Live Stream: GOSH Charity Edition, a special four-hour charity livestream of Taskmaster hosted by Alex Horne and Jake Bhardwaj.

== Personal life ==
Simons has lived in Brighton since January 2022, having previously lived in Mapperley, Nottingham, with his parents. He grew up with two dogs named Betty and Walter. As of 2025, Walter has cancer.

Simons has been open regarding his struggles with clinical depression, testicular torsion, and anxiety. As of July 2026, he has been diagnosed with obsessive-compulsive disorder (OCD).

== Filmography ==
Key
| † | Denotes films that have not yet been released |

Film
| Year | Title | Role | Notes | Ref. |
|---|---|---|---|---|
| TBA | Technoblade Never Dies † | Himself | Documentary | |

Television
| Year | Title | Role | Notes | Ref. |
|---|---|---|---|---|
| 2025 | Black Mirror | Himself | Cameo; Episode: "USS Callister: Into Infinity" | |
| 2025 | Question Time | Himself, panellist | Special episode exploring the challenges of growing up in the 21st century. | |
| 2026 | Celebrity MasterChef | Himself | Contestant | |

Music videos
| Year | Title | Artist(s) | Role | Ref. |
|---|---|---|---|---|
| 2021 | "Inferno" | Sub Urban and Bella Poarch | Bellboy | |

== Discography ==
| Title | Year | Album | Ref. |
|---|---|---|---|
| "The Internet's Getting Worse" | 2024 | Non-album singles | |
| "Grey Day" | 2026 | Non-album singles | |

== Tours ==
- TommyInnit: Annoying at First (2023)
- TommyInnit: How To Be A Billionaire (2024)
- TommyInnit: The Survival Tour (2025)

== Bibliography ==
- Simons, Tom; Gold, Will (2022). TommyInnit Says...The Quote Book. Quercus Publishing. ISBN 9781529427974.
- Simons, Tom (10 April 2025). TommyInnit's Guide to Survival (Signed ed.). Quercus Publishing. ISBN 9781529445398.
- Simons, Tom (10 April 2025). TommyInnit's Guide to Survival. Quercus Publishing. ISBN 9781529442229.

== Awards and nominations ==
| Year | Award | Category | Result | Ref. |
|---|---|---|---|---|
| 2021 | The Streamer Awards | Best Minecraft Streamer | Won | |
| 2024 | Sarcoma UK Shining Star Awards | Partnership of the Year | Won | |

| Publication | Year | World record | R. Status | Ref. |
|---|---|---|---|---|
| Guinness World Records | 2021 | Most viewers of a Minecraft gameplay live stream on Twitch | Record | |
| Guinness World Records | 2021 | Most followed Minecraft channel on Twitch | Record | |

== See also ==
- List of YouTubers
- List of most-followed Twitch channels
