= Keemstar =

American internet personality (born 1982)

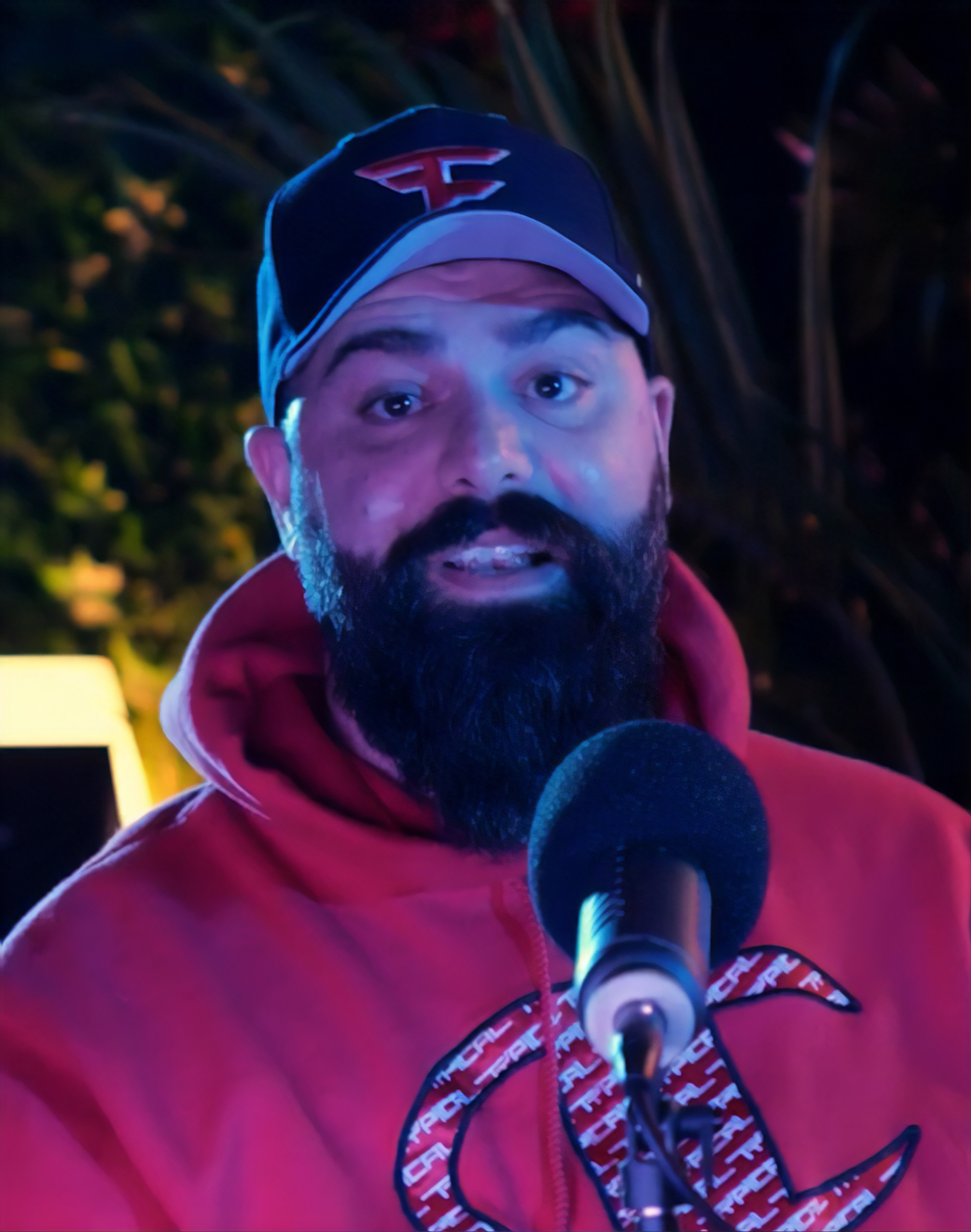
- Keemstar in 2020
- Born: Daniel M. Keem; March 8, 1982 (age 44); Buffalo, New York, U.S.
- Other names: Killer Keemstar; DJ Keemstar
- Occupations: YouTuber; streamer
- Children: 1

Instagram information
- Page: keemstar
- Followers: 175 thousand

Twitch information
- Channel: keemstar
- Years active: 2017–2021
- Followers: 131 thousand

X information
- Handle: @KEEMSTAR
- Followers: 2.5 million

YouTube information
- Channel: DramaAlert
- Years active: 2009–2025
- Genres: Entertainment; tabloid
- Subscribers: 5.23 million
- Views: 1.26 billion
- Last updated: April 14, 2026
- Website: dramaalert.com

Daniel M. Keem (born March 8, 1982), known online as Keemstar, is an American YouTuber, podcaster, and streamer who is mainly known for being the host of the Internet popular culture news show DramaAlert.

== Early life ==
Keem was born in 1982 in Buffalo, New York. He has one brother and one sister. He is of predominantly Sicilian and Greek descent. Keem worked in a legal collections office before beginning his internet career in 2009.

== Internet career ==
Keemstar hosts DramaAlert, an entertainment and gossip program that covers news and developments within the YouTube and video game communities.

Keem's first appearance on YouTube was in a Halo 3 YouTube video from January 2009, where he was recorded trash talking through the online multiplayer voice chat. In September 2012, Keem began using the hashtag #DramaAlert on Twitter. (Note: On his suspended Twitter.) In June 2014, after numerous terminations, he registered his current channel DramaAlert. Keem often offers his own opinions on subjects he reports on.

In July 2010, Keem became the most subscribed person on BlogTV.

In November 2010, Keem was swatted; the caller claimed to be a deaf person being held hostage at his address.

In 2010, during an argument with a moderator named Alex on the website BattleCam.com, Keem encouraged his viewers to type "Alex is a stupid nigger" in the stream's chat; he later apologized for saying the word.

In February 2011, Keem promoted FortressCraft, a game coming to Xbox Live. Keem contacted the Indie developer and made a deal with them, taking part-ownership of the game. It went on to sell 2 million copies.

In July 2011, Keem held a tournament alongside Alki David called the 'Billionaire's Challenge' in which contestants competed for prizes. During production of a second Billionaire's Challenge, David stated an assisted suicide would be shown, which caused controversy and led to some YouTubers canceling their participation. David later clarified it was a joke, while the second show went ahead.

In June 2012, Keem and Call of Duty YouTuber ONLYUSEmeBLADE created the Bad Kid Show podcast. In January 2016, Keem posted a tweet directed at TotalBiscuit, a YouTuber who was diagnosed with terminal cancer, saying that he could not wait to report on his death. Keem later apologized for the tweet. TotalBiscuit died in May 2018.

In May 2016, iDubbbz released a video critique on YouTube about Keem. In the video, he accused Keem of threatening big YouTubers with negative coverage and promoting small channels or accusing them of hiding something. iDubbbz called Keem a "very rash decision maker" and showed clips of Keem saying what iDubbbz deemed to be regrettable. In response, Keem called the video "entertaining" and denied wanting to attack other YouTubers, saying he has "no problem booking guests or landing exclusive interviews". He also apologized for the comments and incidents he caused, but claimed he was justified in saying "nigger" since a genealogical DNA test said he was nine percent black.

In 2016, Keem falsely accused RuneScape Twitch streamer Tony Winchester—known as RSGloryandGold—of being a pedophile, confusing him with John Phillips, a convicted sex offender who used RuneScape to attract children for sex. Keemstar was later proven to be incorrect as Winchester proved his innocence, causing Keem to apologize, fire one of his editors, offer Winchester $1000 (which was refused), and delete his videos related to the matter. Winchester later forgave Keem. In 2018, Keem founded "Fortnite Friday", an online Fortnite tournament that featured various content creators, streamers, and professional players competing against each other every Friday. In 2019, Keem created a spinoff to "Fortnite Friday" called "Minecraft Monday".

DramaAlert, known as the TMZ of YouTube, grew into a prominent source of news about the YouTube community, with Keemstar hosting short, regularly published episodes that summarized major developments and often featured interviews with people involved in the stories. By 2018, the channel had accumulated more than 3.2 million subscribers and over half a billion views. The operation later expanded from a one-person project into a remote team that researched stories and prepared material for the program. Keemstar remained closely involved in selecting stories, conducting interviews and editing the videos. His knowledge of YouTube culture and direct relationships with creators were identified as important factors in the program's growth.

In April 2019, Keem uploaded a DramaAlert interview featuring YouTuber Etika, who had exhibited unstable behavior in the weeks leading up to the interview. During the interview, Etika made several statements predominantly centered around death and his perspectives on the world. At one point, he referred to himself as the "antichrist" and expressed a desire to "purge all life". Keem questioned Etika on whether his actions leading up to the interview were publicity stunts or if he had genuinely experienced a mental breakdown. Etika denied using his actions for publicity and later claimed that life was a "video game" and that "death means nothing"; Keem then inquired that if life were a simulation, "then why live?... Just jump off a cliff? If it's just a simulation, who cares?"

Two months following the interview, Etika uploaded a suicide note in the form of a video titled "I'm sorry". Keem was among the people Etika spoke about, saying "Keemstar, I wish you the best, my nigga". Etika's body was found in the East River four days after the video was uploaded, with the Office of Chief Medical Examiner determining that he had drowned after jumping from the Manhattan Bridge. Keem faced criticism following Etika's suicide, with some fans blaming him for Etika's death due to the DramaAlert interview and statements made on Twitter before and after the interview. Keem argued that he was not to blame for Etika's death because he seemed fine privately and doctors believed he was stable. Keem later posted a screenshot of several texts allegedly sent by Etika's mother, which stated that he was not to blame for her son's suicide and that he loved Keem and his show.

In May 2020, YouTuber Ethan Klein released a video exposé about Keem, with one of his claims being that he exploited Etika. This resulted in G Fuel ending their sponsorship with Keem.

In April 2021, in response to Jake Paul facing sexual assault allegations from TikTok user Justine Paradise, Keem posted on Twitter that there is no way to sexually assault someone orally, stating the victim had to choose to "open her mouth" as well as quoting "Is there really no way to get away? I just really don't believe this story at all."

On October 25, 2021, Keem announced on Twitter his plan to retire from YouTube on March 8, 2022, the day of his 40th birthday and after 14 years of content creation. In his announcement video released one day later titled "Retired," he expressed his dissatisfaction with making videos on the platform, citing the effects of cancel culture, changes to YouTube's algorithm, and the website's community as factors for his decision. On November 12, 2021, Keem hired a new host, Willy Mac, and also rehired a former host, TyBlue. However, on February 12, 2022, Keem announced that he had changed his mind and would not retire from DramaAlert, citing a lack of confidence in any permanent replacement and a new 3-year sponsorship deal struck with sports betting company MyBookie.

Since 2023, Keem has been hosting a podcast titled "Lolcow Live", alongside Boogie2988 and WingsOfRedemption. As of 2026, The DramaAlert YouTube channel no longer posts daily news content, instead posting infrequent Shorts. DramaAlert remains active on X and Snapchat and posts short form content.

== Personal life ==
Keemstar has a daughter. Keemstar identifies as agnostic. Keemstar got engaged to influencer Miss Brantley in July 2024.

== Discography ==
=== Singles ===
List of singles, showing year released and album name
Title	Year	Album
"Dollar in the Woods!" (Note: Remix. Original song from 2012.)	2017	Non-album singles
"Keem Pop"	2020	Non-album singles

=== Podcasts ===
Year	Title	Role
2012–2014	BadKidCast	Himself (co-host)
2015–2016	#Triggered	Himself (co-host)
2016–2019, 2024	Baited!	Himself (co-host)
2020–2022	Mom's Basement	Himself (host)
2023–2026	LolcowLive	Himself (co-host)
