= G Fuel =

Caffeinated drink mix sold by Gamma Radiation Labs

- Type: Drink mix
- Manufacturer: Gamma Labs
- Country of origin: United States
- Introduced: 2012; 13 years ago
- Website: gfuel.com

G Fuel (stylized in all uppercase as G FUEL) is a brand of caffeinated drink mix sold by Gamma Labs, based in Hauppauge, New York. It is marketed as a supplement for gaming that is designed to improve focus and reaction time.

G Fuel was originally released as a water-soluble caffeinated powder. It has since expanded its line of products, including carbonated versions of flavors in cans and caffeine-free "hydration" flavors, among others.

It is one of the largest energy drink companies in the United States, with an estimated $50 million in annual revenue.

== Overview ==
Logo before June 10, 2025

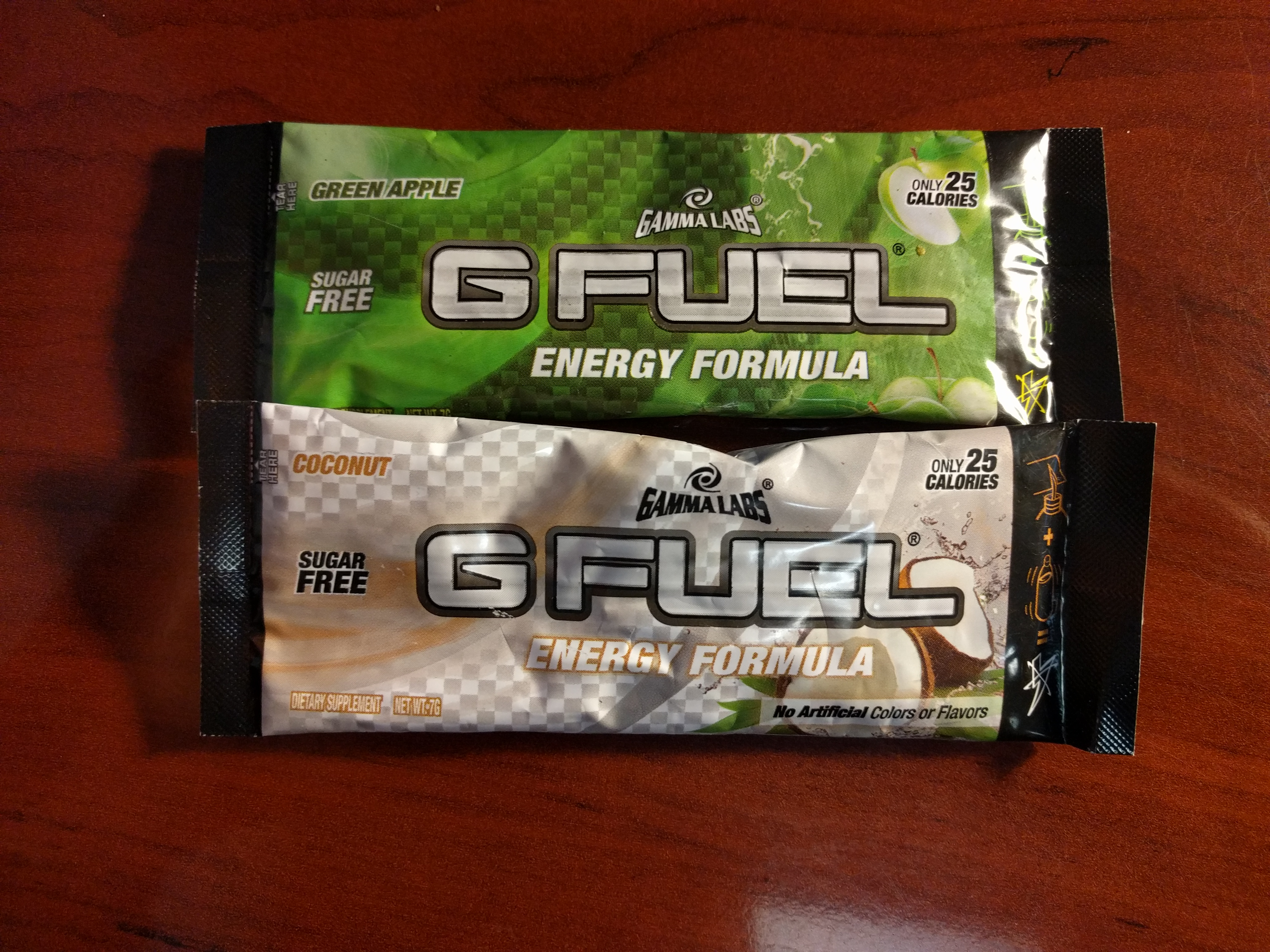
Green Apple and Coconut energy formula packs

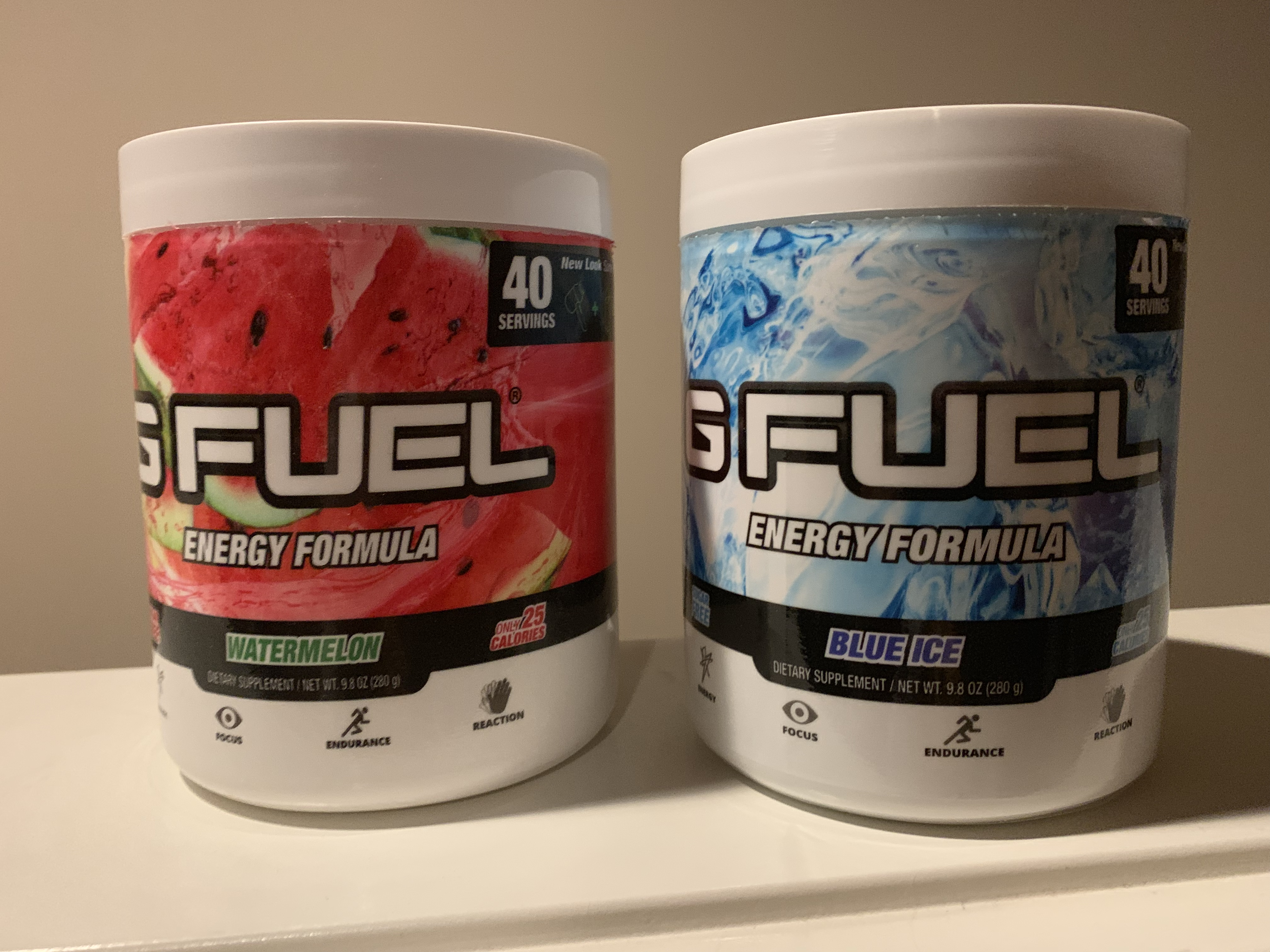
A G Fuel Watermelon tub and G Fuel Blue Ice tub

A serving of G Fuel contains 140 to 150 mg of caffeine. G Fuel is available in multiple flavors, typically fruit-based, such as lingonberry, fruit punch, green apple, and lemon lime. In addition, G Fuel often collaborates with film production companies, game studios, video game media companies, and musicians, to create custom, promotional flavors.

== Controversy ==
In April 2018, Gamma Labs settled a $118,500 lawsuit with California's Environmental Research Center over lead contamination in their G Fuel products. 18 samples of G Fuel were found to have contained enough lead content that warning labels were required, per California's Proposition 65.

On June 16, 2022, Gamma Labs fired seven of its talent managers, citing "restructuring", a day after five of them reported its CEO, Cliff Morgan, for using a slur and making derogatory statements while on a team call. G Fuel did not make an official statement on the event, though it acknowledged Morgan had called employees "lazy motherfuckers". The company also banned users who mentioned the event from their Twitch live chat. More than 75 content creators who were partnered with G Fuel announced that they were terminating their partnerships over the incident.
