= Sarcoma Foundation of America =

American cancer research nonprofit

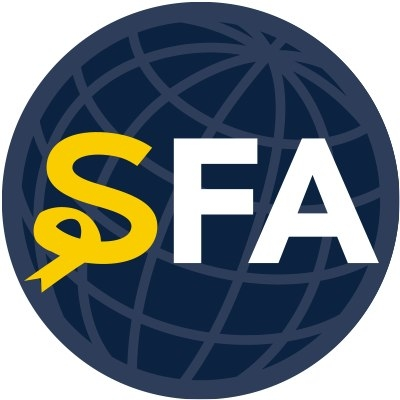
- Abbreviation: SFA
- Formation: 2000
- Type: Non-profit organization
- Tax ID no.: 52-2275294
- Purpose: Cancer research for sarcoma
- Headquarters: Washington, D.C.
- Location: United States
- Official language: English
- BOD President: Dr. Mark Thornton
- Website: curesarcoma.org

The Sarcoma Foundation of America (SFA) is an American cancer research organization. It was founded in 2001 with the main intent of researching possible cures for sarcoma. It operates as a non-profit organization in the United States.

The organization received significant attention in 2022 after the death from sarcoma of Minecraft YouTuber Technoblade, with proceeds from his career going to the charity. Technoblade held a charity livestream in 2021 raising money, and some friends and collaborators also raised money for the charity in livestreams following his death.
