= Metagame (disambiguation) =

A metagame is a way that a game interacts with the world.

Metagame or metagaming may also refer to:

- Instrumental play, playing a game as well as possible
- Metagame analysis, metagames in game theory
- Metagaming (book), 2017

== See also ==
- Metagaming Concepts, board game publisher
- List of metafictional works § Interactive media and video games
