= Video game exploit =

Use of video game bugs to gain unintended advantage

In video games, an exploit is the use of a feature that gives a substantial unfair advantage to players using it. An exploit can either be an intended game mechanic being abused, or an unintended side effect from a bug or glitch being performed. However, whether particular acts constitute an exploit can be controversial, typically involving the argument that the issues are part of the game, and no changes or external programs are needed to take advantage of them.

== Controversy ==
Exploiting is considered cheating by most in the gaming community and gaming industry, due to the unfair advantage usually gained by the exploiter. Whether an exploit is considered a cheat is a matter of widespread debate that varies between genres, games, and other factors. Most software developers of online games prohibit exploiting in their terms of service and often issue sanctions against players found to be exploiting. There is some contention by exploiters that exploiting should not be considered cheating as it is merely taking advantage of actions allowed by the software. They view exploiting as a skill because certain exploits take a significant amount of time to find, or dexterity and timing to use. Many other players believe that exploits should be considered cheats that the developers should address and exploiters should be banned.

Those who consider exploits cheating argue that they are contrary to the spirit of the game even if rules and code do not specifically prohibit them, undermining the enjoyable dynamics of it, and that they are destructive of the game's community. A World of Warcraft community manager described the effect of exploits on a game's community as "devastating".

Defenders of exploits argue that the rules of the game allow them, and that players using exploits might not know they are behaving against the designer's intention. So-called exploits, in this view, are not cheats because they do not change the game in any way, and all players who know of them can use them. The players who use such techniques may consider them fair for use in the game if they are not explicitly disallowed in the Terms of Service or other such rules governing participation. Exploiters also argue that the fastest way to get developers to update games to eliminate exploits is to use them as much as possible, as that greatly increases the quantity of complaints about them.

== Griefing ==
While players most often use video game exploits to gain a gameplay relevant advantage for themselves, sometimes they instead use them to irritate other players, also known as griefing. One team of gamers in Team Fortress 2 produced popular online videos demonstrating their griefing with several exploits present in the game, most of them being of little intended gameplay use. Another famous incident during the Ultima Online beta test saw a player kill Lord British when that character was supposed to be invincible; the tester was later banned for exploiting because he did not report the bugs he found.

== Common types ==
Wavedashing, an exploit mechanic used competitively in many platform fighter games, as demonstrated in a modded instance of Rivals of Aether

Common types of exploits include:

Duping
Duplicating items or money.
Lag and disconnection exploits
A game with inadequate lag handling may let players intentionally cause lag for themselves to cause an advantage. Similarly, a game that lets a player disconnect immediately with no consequences may let players exit a game without suffering a loss. (Shogun 2: Total War)
Geometry
Taking advantage of how the game world is built. Typically the goal of these exploits is to reach normally inaccessible areas or take unintended shortcuts in the game world. These are commonly achieved by going through walls, crossing invisible barriers made by the programmers, or scaling ledges not intended to be climbable.
Twinking
Twinking usually refers to taking advantage of design flaws in the game's gearing system in order to equip a new or low-level character with much higher level gear. Other actions commonly referred to as "twinking" include giving a new character a large amount of gold, and intentionally keeping a character at a low level while gaining much better equipment.
Movement speed bugs
These usually allow the player to move faster than intended, such as bunny hopping. Many of these have been embraced by certain games, such as skiing in the Tribes series.
Safe zones
Places where a player can attack with no risk of being attacked back. This is often a form of an exploit in the geometry (terrain) of a game—however, a game may have areas that make players within them safe (especially in PvP games/zones in which the opposing faction(s) may not enter) from attack while not disallowing the safe players to attack.
Game mechanics
Taking advantage of the systems that make up the gameplay. A game mechanics exploit is not a bug: it is a case in which a system is working as designed, but not as intended. An example is the "wavedash" in Super Smash Bros. Melee, in which the momentum gained from using a directional aerial dodge could be retained on landing; with proper timing this allows characters to use a stationary attack while sliding across the ground or reposition themselves in a snappy, precise way.
Cheesing
Performing repeated, usually considered cheap, attack moves in such a way that does not allow the enemy to respond or fight back. An example would be Street Fighter II in which one can perform repeated moves that keep the enemy being attacked and against the side of the screen, with no way for them to perform a counterattack.

Each game has the potential for exploits unique to that game's rules. For example, in World of Warcraft, wall-walking allowed a player to climb steep mountains that are supposed to be impassable to get into unfinished areas or make one's character not attackable by mobs or other players. EverQuest had an exploit in player versus player analogous to weight cutting in sports whereby a player would intentionally lose levels by dying in order to compete against lower-level players while wielding higher-level items and skills. In the game City of Heroes players used teleport powers to place others inside the PvP zones' watchtowers which, because they were originally designed as props for atmosphere, had no means of egress other than teleportation.

== Response ==
Developers may find it difficult to identify and respond to an exploit because players who discover vulnerabilities in a game may be reluctant to inform the game's developers, in order to continue exploiting. However, once developers learn of exploits, the response may include banning players who took advantage of the exploit, changing the game's rules to eliminate it or make it less useful, or even embracing the exploit. Positive opinions of the exploit can lead to the designers embracing it as emergent gameplay, such as when skiing in the Tribes series of games gained developer support. The now-standard practice of rocket jumping originated in a similar way, by exploiting game mechanics in a way not foreseen by the developers. Otherwise, the developers may try to fix the underlying problem, or discourage use of the exploit if the issue cannot be clearly addressed by technical means. In severe cases, players may be banned. Further, the game state of the world may need to be reset to restore game balance. For example, following a serious currency dupe exploit in EverQuest II, the developers removed large amounts of duped money from the game to address the rampant inflation it caused in the game's virtual economy.

== See also ==
- Cheating in online games
- Emergent gameplay
