= Twinking =

Disapproved behavior in role-playing games

Twinking is a type of behavior in role-playing games that is disapproved of by other players. A player who engages in such behavior is known as a twink. The precise definition of twinking varies depending on the variety of role-playing game:

- In "pen and paper" role-playing games, a twink is often synonymous with a munchkin, i.e. a powergamer who seeks to acquire power and loot at the expense of their teammates.
- In MUDs – Multi-User Dungeons or Domains –a twink is a player who is variously anything from a munchkin to a newbie (new player) to a griefer, or a bad faith player.
- In massively multiplayer online role-playing games, or MMORPGs, twinking refers to a character gaining equipment with the assistance of a higher level character, particularly by giving the low-level character higher level equipment that is otherwise unattainable. It can also be used to describe the process of keeping a video game character at a low level while using in-game currency, earned by a high-level character, to provide it with superior equipment.

A related term, smurfing, also exists. Often used in video gaming, smurfing describes a situation in which "a highly-skilled player creates a secondary account as a disguise to play against less proficient opponents." The term originates from two Warcraft II players employing the strategy under the names "Papa Smurf" and "Smurfette".

== RPGs ==
In role-playing video games, particularly MMORPGs, twinking refers to outfitting a new character or player with items or other resources that are not normally available to new or low-level characters. A twink in this usage is a type of powergamer and munchkin. The term can also refer to the twinked character itself (e.g., "My twink has all the best gear."). In its most basic definition, a twink is a character with better gear than one could have easily acquired on one's own.

Twinking is typically done by transferring higher-end equipment from the player's (or their friend's) more experienced characters (who often have excess gear that would be much more useful to the lower-level character). It can also be done by equipping the character with the best possible gear for their level range, and filling them with end-game enchantments.

Many new players dislike twinking of others' characters, since it gives a big advantage to established players starting a new character. Some new players do not like to have their own characters twinked, as they prefer to earn the equipment for themselves.

It is common for twinking items to be traded at good values due to persistent demand. Sometimes, this will go so far as to inflate twink equipment prices, as high-level players are willing to pay more than a newbie would be able to.

=== Countermeasures ===
- Many games have item restrictions that prevent low-level characters from using higher-level items and upsetting game balance; in Diablo II and The Lord of the Rings Online, most items require a minimum ability score or level to equip. This did not totally prevent the problem of higher-level characters handing down gold or very powerful gear; it just changed what could be used in this strategy.
- Some games, such as World of Warcraft (WoW), Anarchy Online (AO), EverQuest (EQ), and The Lord of the Rings Online (LOTRO) have certain items become restricted to one character—"Soulbound" (WoW), "NoDrop" (AO), "No Trade" (EQ), or "Bound" (LOTRO)—when the items are picked up, equipped, or used. These items cannot thereafter be transferred to other characters (even one's own characters on the same realm/server, with some limited exceptions). Some items are bound to a specific account ("Bind To Account" in WoW, "Heirloom" in EQ, "Bound to account" in LOTRO) and cannot be transferred to other people's accounts, but can be traded between characters on the same account.
- WoW further reduced twinking in Battlegrounds (player-versus-player combat arenas) by awarding experience points for Battleground victories, so that as PvP characters gain experience, they also gain levels and thus become disqualified from lower-level brackets. Additionally, some of the best-in-slot items became "heirlooms" that apply a percentage increase to all experience point gains. Players can disable experience point gain for an in-game fee, but must play in separate Battlegrounds as long as they do so where most of the other players will also be twinkers.
- WoW eliminated twinking in PvP combat arenas in patch 7.0.3, by removing all stats gained from equipment upon entry and instead giving the character predetermined PvP stats based on its class and specialization.
- Pokémon games use a badge system, which makes Pokémon above a certain level tougher to control, making random actions and falling asleep instead of obeying commands until the trainer has completed enough of the campaign.

== Etymology ==
There are several possible etymologies for the word. It may not have been derived from a single source, instead evolving from multiple convergent usages. Its exact origin is unclear.

The gay-slang usage of "twink" has been suggested as a likely origin. One of the connotations of this usage is "a young/inexperienced person who can outfit himself fashionably because of financial benefits from an older/experienced sugar daddy." This parallels MMORPGs, where in-game money is a strong limiting factor in the virtual economy and gear is usually in the form of clothing and jewelry.

The word "twink" appeared in the Ultima Online: Renaissance playguide in the glossary of terms (copyrighted in 2000). It was asserted to have a meaning similar to its current one, but also included powerlevelling.

On the MUD Sojourn, which several creators of EverQuest played, "twink" was alternately used to refer to powerleveling and metagaming. As MUDs date to 1978, this use of the term may possibly predate later uses.

The term twink and twinking predated MMOs and was prevalent in many MUDs. The term came from flags on much of the high-end gear that cause gear to be displayed as (twinkling) <gear name>. It was not an alternate name for powerleveling, but could be used as a method of powerleveling.

== See also ==
- Munchkin (role-playing games)
- Optimization (role-playing games)
- Powerleveling
- Cheating
- Powergaming
- Min-maxing
- Role-playing game terms
- Catfishing
- Sockpuppetry (especially on Wikipedia)
