= Duping (video games) =

Videogame duplication exploit

Duping refers to the practice of using a bug in a video game to illegitimately create duplicates of unique items or currency in a persistent online game, such as an MMOG. Duping can vastly destabilize a virtual economy or even the gameplay itself, depending on the item duplicated and the rate at which duplication occurs. Modern persistent world games include automated detection of duping. Duping is usually considered to be a game cheat.

== Effects ==
The effect of duping on a game's economy depends on whether an item or currency was being duplicated and to what degree the duping took place. Currency dupes cause inflation and conversely item dupes cause the item to lose value. On 7 November 2003 in the MMORPG RuneScape, an extremely rare item, the Magenta Party hat (now the Purple Party hat) was duped well over 2 million times; the effects are still seen today in the game's economy. While Jagex, the game's owners, did everything they could to ban the duping users, the duped party hats are still circulating. Due to the fact that the discontinued items, party-hats, were no longer available, the purple party-hat being duped caused it to become the cheapest hat. While its price is still high for an item, it is considered "the noob's party-hat".

When currency is duplicated, the increase in the overall amount of money in the virtual economy decreases the value of the currency, which in turn increases item prices in player-to-player transactions. In a 2005 case of currency duping in EverQuest II, the game's developers noticed an unexpected 20% rise in the total money found in the economy over a 24-hour period following the dissemination of the dupe. A significant currency dupe in Star Wars Galaxies was found after the designers compared how much money was created versus how much money was destroyed and noted that, despite more money leaving the system than entering, they observed no shortage of money in the virtual world.

Item dupes generally have the opposite effect, causing the price of the duped items to drop as the supply of that item increases.

In addition to the effects on the game economy, the sudden influx of currency or items also affects players involved in real-money trading. In the EverQuest II case, the dupers attempted to sell the illegitimate currency on Station Exchange for real money and supposedly made over US$70,000 from online auctions. Dupes are highly prized among those involved in real-money trading, and in this form it has been likened to counterfeiting except with reduced risk.

== Response ==
As with other exploits, a common response to duping is to ban the involved players. Banning players for duping can be controversial though depending on how the game developer determines a player to be "involved" in the dupe. In Star Wars Galaxies some players learned how to dupe the currency. Sony Online Entertainment (SOE) banned players who possessed duped currency. It is alleged that people who were not directly involved in the exploit, but who accepted duped currency in legitimate trade were also banned. In reaction to what was perceived to be an unjust punishment, several players joined a mass demonstration at a central location in the game world. SOE responded to the disruption caused by the large gathering by teleporting all player characters involved away from the demonstration area. A popular online urban legend is that many player characters were teleported into space, essentially killing them. Although evidence as to whether or not this occurred cannot be substantiated, it has been voiced in many popular gaming avenues, such as Penny Arcade.

Another method to mitigate the effects of duping would be a rollback, in which game data is reset to an earlier data backup prior to the first known instance of duping. This can include all game data or be limited to specific items, characters, or other means determined to be involved in the duping. Significant rollbacks can be a highly unpopular decision with the players and is best done before much time has passed. Alternately, SOE was able to track and remove the duped currency in EverQuest II.

The virtual world designers may find more natural ways to remove the offending currency or items from the game. In Star Wars Galaxies the legitimate economy had been losing money faster than money was being created due to a variety of money sinks. After the dupe bug was fixed and trillions of potentially duped in-game currency deleted, the designers decided to let the economy to continue running at a net loss until the levels could return to normal.

An immediate, although often temporary, step to prevent further issues from duping calls for aspects of the game to be disabled until the exploit can be addressed permanently. SOE stopped Station Exchange auctions to prevent the dupers from selling the illegitimate EverQuest II currency.

== Other notable cases ==
The video game Phantasy Star Online Episode I & II had a duping glitch, which was activated by talking repeatedly with a walking NPC and a merchant. Because the characters and data of the game were saved on memory cards, SEGA could not remove the duping glitch, and the online game was filled with duped items and money.

In the Xbox 360 game Forza Motorsport 2, there was a duping glitch which enabled the player to sell car upgrades they had not yet purchased. By selecting an upgrade, and quickly pressing X, the player is able to have the option to sell the upgrade, without having to buy it first. This caused the Auction House to become flawed, because players who had earned their money via the glitch, were able to out-buy players that only had money they have gotten through races. There is a patch to fix the glitch, but players can still perform it, and transfer the money onto another account.

== See also ==
- Cheating in video games
- Cheat cartridge
- Missingno.
