= Rage applying =

Applications to many other jobs by a dissatisfied employee

In human resources, rage applying refers to the application to a large number of jobs, typically online, when an employee is fed up with their current role. An individual may be prompted to begin rage applying after they have been denied a promotion or raise, are feeling unrecognized or underappreciated. Rage applying is a response to quiet quitting and may be felt as a form of empowerment or revenge against an employer. Rage applying can also allow an individual to understand their current market value.

Rage applying stems from a negative trigger, and that running from a job rather than towards one may lead to a poor long-term fit.

The term originates from a December 2022 TikTok video released by a Canadian millennial under the username @Redweez who worked in corporate social media marketing.

== See also ==
- Rage quit
- Spray and pray
