= No Comment (disambiguation) =

"No comment", or "no comments" is a phrase used to avoid answering questions from journalists.

No Comment may also refer to:

- No Comment (band), an American band, active from 1987 to 1993
- No Comment (Front 242 album), 1984
- No Comment (Van Gogh album), 1997
- No Comment, an album by Nitro, 2018
- "No Comment", a song by Yeat from the deluxe edition of 2 Alive (2022)
- "No Comment", a non-album single by Fredo (2025)
- No Comment, a segment on the TV network Euronews
- "No Comments", a song by Don Toliver from the compilation album JackBoys 2 (2025)
- Nocom (an abbreviated version of No Comment), a major exploit on the Minecraft server 2b2t
