= Kill stealing =

Practice in online games

In multiplayer video games, particularly in MOBAs, first-person shooters, MMORPGs and MUDs, kill stealing is the practice of obtaining credit for killing an enemy when another player has put more effort into the kill. This usually happens when a game only keeps track of which player defeats an enemy, rather than which player dealt the most damage, leading to the so-called last-hitting mechanics. If one player whittles down some enemy's health points, but a different player eventually finishes the enemy off, this second player might obtain all of the loot or experience points from the enemy. Kill stealing is common when the rewards for finishing enemies off are highly desired within the game.

Some players feel that kill stealing is a dishonorable practice. A good faith attempt to secure a kill on an enemy that might otherwise have gotten away can sometimes be perceived as a kill steal if the other player believes the kill was already certain.

== Overview ==
In a multiplayer video game, kill stealing refers to the actions of a player that allows them to gain the rewards of killing an adversary that is already engaged in combat with another player. Those rewards can take the form of in-game currency, experience, or items. Intentional kill stealing is recognized in the gaming community as a form of annoying and disruptive behavior, with some forms considered by the community to be a forming of griefing.

There are two main causes for kill stealing: the desire for the reward and the desire to cause other players grief. Kill stealing is predominantly done to gain the rewards from a kill. Griefers kill steal as only one of their tactics in annoying other players. However, there are side-reasons towards kill stealing, with a few being unintentional, i.e. killing an enemy with low player HP, and then killing another enemy - in a panic - which is being dealt by someone else.

Complaints of kill stealing are sometimes heard in online first-person shooters. In most of these games, the credit for a kill goes to the player who deals the killing shot. Players usually ignore complaints of kill stealing in FPSs because the rewards are less significant and because these games move much faster (i.e., it was probably accidental). Furthermore, in FPS combat, players are usually either allies (in which case the kill's credit going to one player or another has no in-game meaning beyond ego) or in direct enmity with one another (providing both a justification for cutthroat tactics, and a generally immediate means of redress). Kill stealing can sometimes specifically refer to the disruption of a particularly "interesting" kill that would have earned a lot of extra points beyond the kill itself.

By contrast, in most MMORPGs players may be competing for the same in-game resources, but are not generally in direct conflict with one another. (In situations where they are, such as two opposite-faction players in a World of Warcraft player-versus-player server, there is usually little animosity towards kill-stealing, as there is a means of redress and prevention, and it is seen as part of the general struggle between Horde and Alliance)

In team based game modes, many players overreact when they do not understand the objective is for the team to win, rather than individual progression.

== Prevention ==
Many newer MMORPGs implement game designs that distributes the reward more fairly to those who fought a creature. Rewards can be distributed based on how much the player contributed to defeating the creature. A player that does 30% of the damage gains 30% of the money and experience points rewarded for defeating the creature. A game might have a more sophisticated way to measure a player's contribution to the fight as well. A character whose primary task is healing other characters might be judged based on how much (s)he healed combatants during the fight.

In some newer multiplayer first-person shooters such as Battlefield 4 and Battlefield 1, if a player does enough damage to an enemy player, but a teammate gets the final blow, then the player will receive what is known as 'Assist Counts as Kill'. The player then gets awarded the amount of damage they did to the enemy as points, and on their statistics it counts as kill rather than as an assist.

== See also ==
- Camping – another practice that arises when players compete for rewards
- Ninja looting – improperly taking the reward from a defeated creature
- Powerleveling – powerlevelers are frequently blamed for kill stealing
- Gold farming
