= Gaming etiquette =

Standards in playing multiplayer video games

Gaming etiquette (also called gamer etiquette or video game etiquette) refers to the norms adopted while playing multiplayer video games. While specific genres and games have their own accepted rules of conduct, some of these rules are universal across almost all games.

== Universal gaming etiquette ==
Regardless of the game, certain behaviors are universally encouraged or discouraged in multi-player video games.

- Cheating is rarely acceptable as it could cause the game to become unfair and/or detracts from the enjoyment of legitimate players. Cheats are more acceptable in cases where they do not provide any disadvantages/advantages, such as for humor.
- In voice chat, players are encouraged to refrain from transmitting loud background noise such as music that may diminish other players' ability to communicate.
- In games where most communication between players is through text, it is usually considered rude to type in all caps, because it is how one "shouts" online. Sending messages of derogatory or spammy nature is also typically considered rude and may go against the rules or terms of service of the game/platform.
- "Camping" (remaining in place to obtain advantages over players who cannot reach or are not aware of the camper) in games such as first-person shooters is a strategy that some find bad manners, and others find part of the game. "Spawnkilling" or "spawn camping" is the most common form of this where a person camps at a central area where an enemy would spawn (the spawnpoint) and kill them as soon as they spawn in.
- In games with split screen (played on the same screen) it may be considered unsporting to look at an opponent's actions by looking at their portion of the screen. This method is also known as screen watching, screening, screen cheating, screen peeking, screen hacking, or screen looking. This also applies to LAN games, where players might be sitting next to each other, or to games in which one player may be streaming their gameplay online, and an unfair player may follow their streaming in order to discover what they are doing (stream sniping).

In some games, players are generally encouraged to be polite and courteous to one another, and avoid excessive profanity and trash talk. Players are also expected to be friendly and welcoming to newcomers, (generally referred to as newbies, or the somewhat more derogative terms Noob or, in leet, N00b) and remember that their lack of skill or understanding of the game is only due to their lack of experience with the game. Taking a new player "under their wing" so to speak is also considered a form of courtesy. It is also a generally accepted rule that a game's events and outcomes should not be taken personally by the players. In progression-based games such as MMOs, players who take action in response to undesirable outcomes (vengeance) are often looked down upon and considered sore losers for not respecting their opponent's victory.

== Variations between games ==
In most games, it is considered bad manners to quit before the game has ended.

However, in other games, such as FIFA 21, the opposite is somewhat true: it is sometimes considered a good thing for a losing player to quit a game after it is clear that it is not feasible for them to win, in an effort to save both players’ time. However, in games where leaving early is encouraged, the player is often still expected to say "gg" or "good game" before leaving; failure to do so can be considered bad manners. However, the winning player saying "gg" on behalf of a losing opponent is impolite, as it presumes that the game has already been won and the other player should quit (this is known as an "offensive gg"). "Rage-quitting", in which a player logs out if they find themselves in a losing situation is also frowned upon, particularly if doing puts their team at a disadvantage or prevents statistics from being updated.

In games involving circumstances where many players need to meet at an agreed-upon time, such as in a raid in World of Warcraft, it is considered bad etiquette to show up late.

== See also ==
- Netiquette
- Cheating in online games
- Camping (video games)
- Trash-talk
