= 2b2t =

Minecraft server

- Logo in use since 2022
- Other names: 2builders2tools
- Release: December 2010; 15 years ago
- Founder: Hausemaster
- Platform: Minecraft: Java Edition (version 1.21.4, cross-play with Minecraft: Bedrock Edition)
- Size: ~100 TB (based on map size ~80 TB ± others)
- Type: Minecraft server
- Website: www.2b2t.org (archived); 2b2t.org (server)

2b2t (2builders2tools) is a Minecraft server founded in December 2010. It is the oldest and most infamous "anarchy server" in the game. The server has almost no rules, and players commonly engage in griefing, which involves the deliberate destruction or alteration of other players' creations, and cheating, which involves the use of modified software to gain an advantage. 2b2t is one of the few Minecraft servers established before 2011 to remain active.

The server is permanently set to hard difficulty and player versus player combat is enabled. It has seen over 1,000,000 players explore its procedurally generated map over approximately 16 years, increasing its file size to over 100 terabytes. 2b2t has been described in news media as the worst Minecraft server due to its toxic playerbase and culture. In 2025, the server's rules were updated on Mojang Studios' request, banning "harmful ideas, hateful symbols, or hateful speech". Since then, a wordfilter was introduced to chat messages as well as on in-game signs.

== History ==
=== 2010–2016: Founding and early history ===
First logo used from 2010 to 2017

The 2b2t Minecraft server was founded in December 2010; it has run consistently without a reset since then. The founders are anonymous, choosing to remain unknown or known only via usernames; the most prominent founder is commonly referred to as "Hausemaster". The server operates with minimal rules, as an "anarchy server"; except in fixing game-breaking exploits, the server operators are relatively hands-off in administrating the server.

Varying explanations have been given for the origin of the server's rules-free style. One server operator told Vice that the server originated as a regular Minecraft server, before he and his friends "decided to open it up to see how much destruction could be made and started advertising it on various places on the Internet." According to 2b2t player and amateur archivist James Rustles, Hausemaster was given control of the server by its original founder, who had established it on the principle of maximum player freedom in the tradition of a Garry's Mod server he already owned.

The server was advertised shortly after its creation on online forums such as 4chan, Facepunch Studios, and Reddit, whose users populated the server by the hundreds due to the total freedom it offered. Members from different forums raided each other and their bases on the server. The founders eventually stopped playing Minecraft, though the server remained online due to the large player base that had been formed. A subreddit was created by a player on March 25, 2012. In early 2013, the file size of 2b2t's world map, which is procedurally generated, was reported to be over 500 gigabytes. This increased to almost one terabyte by late 2015, costing US$90 a month to maintain.

During this era 2b2t experienced lots of early player activity and had regular "incursions," and spawn wars. Most notably was a conflict in early 2011 between players who joined 2b2t from facepunch and players who joined from 4chan. Other conflicts include spawn incursions when players go to spawn to kill new players. The first incursion was started by player Sato86 and was in response to sudden high number of new players joining in 2013 from the Facepunch Forums.

=== 2016–present: Player influx ===
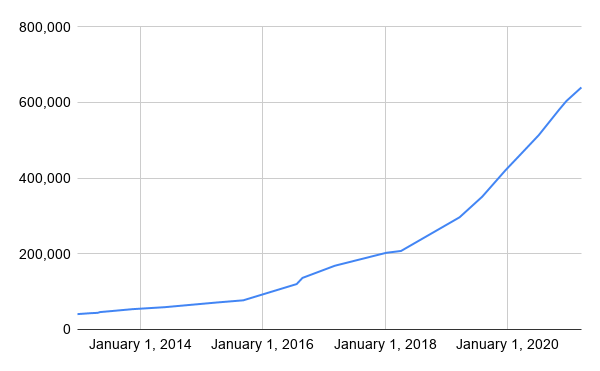
Cumulative frequency graph of unique 2b2t players over time according to the server administrator

On June 1, 2016, popular YouTuber "TheCampingRusher" uploaded a YouTube video of himself playing on 2b2t. This caused a massive influx of new players from the channel's audience, who were at first mostly tourists, as the video gained over two million views in less than four months from its upload. This overwhelmed the server and strained the hardware used to host and run it, bringing together a loose group of older players who banded against these new players.

Although the new players, who were labelled "Rushers", largely outnumbered the older players at the time, the older players had years of experience and resources. Many older players deterred new players by destroying the spawn area to make it uninhabitable and extremely difficult to escape from and repeatedly killing them in-game.

Second logo used between 2017 and 2022

Some players built in-game contraptions designed solely to overload the server, with the intent of making it difficult for TheCampingRusher and his fans to play on it. Some placed obscene content around the spawn area and along player-built roads to get TheCampingRusher's YouTube videos taken down for violations of YouTube's terms of service.

The new players, despite having been discouraged to do so by TheCampingRusher, had destroyed bases and monuments on the server that had stood for years, which is partially what had caused such a response from the player base. When Kiberd from Newsweek asked Hausemaster if he disapproved of the massive influx of new players, he responded by saying that "2b2t is definitely not ruined—in my opinion it's how it should be: absolutely chaotic."

In response to the inundated server and hardware, a queue to enter the server was added. Before then, the server would have about ten players online at the same time. However, at the influx peak, the server had thousands of players waiting in queue. The queue gave earlier 2b2t players priority over newer players, although this feature was removed after a year. The regular queue moves slowly and can contain over a thousand players. Waiting in the queue has been described as an onerous task. Players can pay $20 to access a separate "priority" queue for one month.

=== Server exploits ===
==== 2018–2021: Nocom exploit ====
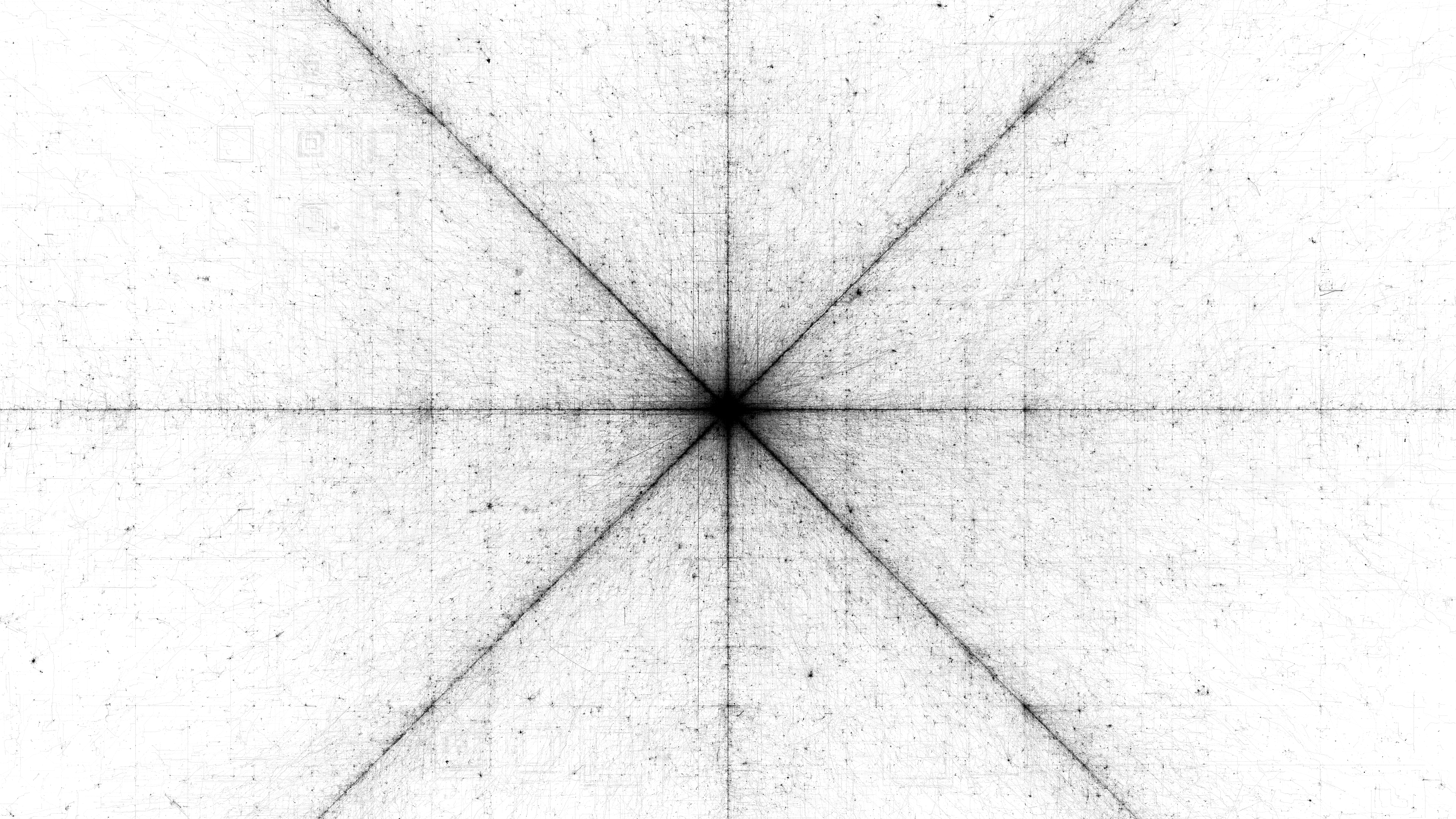
Heat map of player locations on the server from March 2020 to July 2021, created using data collected from the Nocom exploit. Prominent are heavily trafficked "highways" extending for millions of blocks from the central spawn region.

In 2018, a group of players called "Nerds Inc." discovered a software bug in 2b2t's server software that allowed players to query far-away terrain, which players cannot normally view. The loading of huge areas of terrain puts a heavy workload on the server, which Nerds Inc. used to repeatedly crash the server. This was done with the intent to induce the developers of PaperMC, a modified server software used by 2b2t, to create a bug fix for the software, which introduced a vulnerability where the server would now only respond to the querying of far-away terrain if it was already loaded, i.e., proximate to a player. By creating the flawed bug fix, the developers inadvertently gave anyone aware of the vulnerability the ability to test if any given area in the game world contained a player, and to read that area if so. Nerds Inc. was now able to locate all online players and remotely observe the terrain around players in real-time, including valuable storage of in-game items and player-built constructions.

Correlating the coinciding timing of player join and disconnect notices and the loading and unloading of locations let Nerds Inc. tell where specific players stood, not just that a player was there. The exploit became more effective with an adaptive tracking system programmed by a member of Nerds Inc., predicting the paths individual players would take using Monte Carlo localization in response to the server implementing rate-limits preventing less efficient search methods. The data gathered amassed about 2 terabytes during the 3 years of tracking terrain, paths, and base locations.

One group that shared members with Nerds Inc. was supplied with the locations of numerous bases which they raided, looting 200 million in-game items. They kept the exploit secret, creating fake stories behind the destruction of bases and gaslighting. They named the exploit "Nocom", short for "no comment". In 2021, another group called Infinity Incursion independently created a more primitive version of the Nocom exploit and, with their less concealed use of it, other groups started learning about Nocom by June 2021. On July 15, 2021, server admin Hausemaster implemented changes to 2b2t that patched the exploit. Nocom resulted in many bases and in-game item stashes being raided or destroyed, with a total of 15,000 bases being discovered. Rich Stanton of PC Gamer described Nocom as one of the most impactful events in the server's history.

==== 2022–23: RANDAR exploit ====
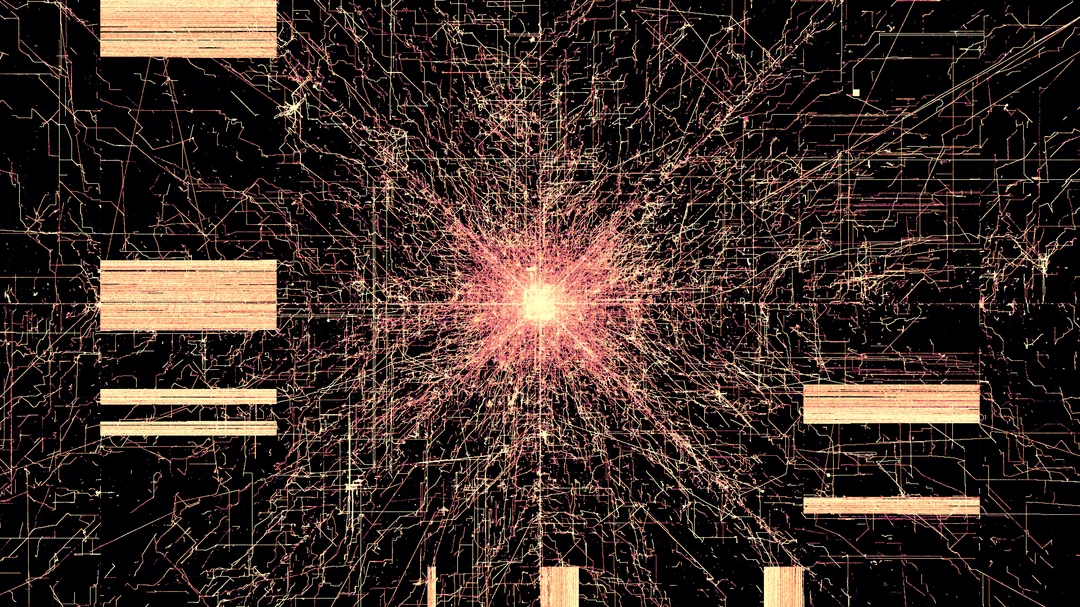
A heat map of RANDAR tracking players across the server world, with brighter areas indicating use of heavy traffic on the highways. Rectangular areas represent "AFK bot" locations that scanned the area for finding hidden bases.

Discovered by player n0pf0x on 7 October 2022, the RANDAR exploit was a Lenstra–Lenstra–Lovász lattice basis reduction algorithm based exploit that used random number generation to determine player coordinates every time a block was placed or broken. According to FitMC, during beta 1.8 development, Markus "Notch" Persson accidentally applied the same RNG to all parts of Minecraft, ranging from structures to item drops. By checking a specific file every time a block is broken or placed, it was then possible to track player movements, working from versions beta 1.8 to 1.12.2, after which the code was changed so that functions used their own RNG.

Despite being patched in 2017 by Mojang, 2b2t remained on version 1.12 until 14 August 2023, allowing the RANDAR exploit to continue functioning. The exploit was shown to "Spawnmasons" and was then used by the group on 2b2t. Despite 2b2t updating to a newer version, the exploit was still active by the time of FitMC's video, due to the exploit working on servers that were previously on the affected versions.

=== 2023–present: Update to 1.19, Bedrock Edition support, censorship and archive project ===
On August 14, 2023, 2b2t updated to Minecraft version 1.19, after running on Minecraft 1.12.2 for over six years. Several additions to the server became controversial, including resetting established terrain and a "soft item economy reset", which removed and decreased the amounts of certain items in player's inventories and storage, resulting in community backlash.

On August 24, Hausemaster apologized and explained his decisionmaking. The next day he announced that the server would be rolling back to 1.12 temporarily and then updating to 1.19 without the controversial changes, and announcing an option to refund priority status for those who have paid for it and are dissatisfied with the changes. In December 2025, the server became cross-platform with Minecraft: Bedrock Edition, allowing players from mobile devices and video game consoles to play with users from Java Edition.

The same month, 2b2t's rules have been updated, mandating the adherence to Xbox community guidelines and banning "builds, structures, or any other content relating to harmful ideas, hateful symbols, or hateful speech". Additionally, a chat filtering system was introduced, censoring profanity and potentially abusive terms in chat messages as well as on placeable in-game signs. GamesRadar+ opined that the rule change may have been caused by the Bedrock Edition support introduced the same month leading to an influx of new and vulnerable players, though noted that Mojang Studios pushed for similar changes earlier that year to the Java-only server MinecraftOnline, the oldest Minecraft survival server of all time.

In May 2026, a small group of server players released a world download for the 1,000,000 by 1,000,000 block area around Spawn, consisting of 24 terabytes of 2b2t terrain data. These areas included 1 million square kilometres of the overworld captured with automated player accounts between November 2024 and April 2026, along with significant chunks of the Nether and End dimensions.

== Culture ==
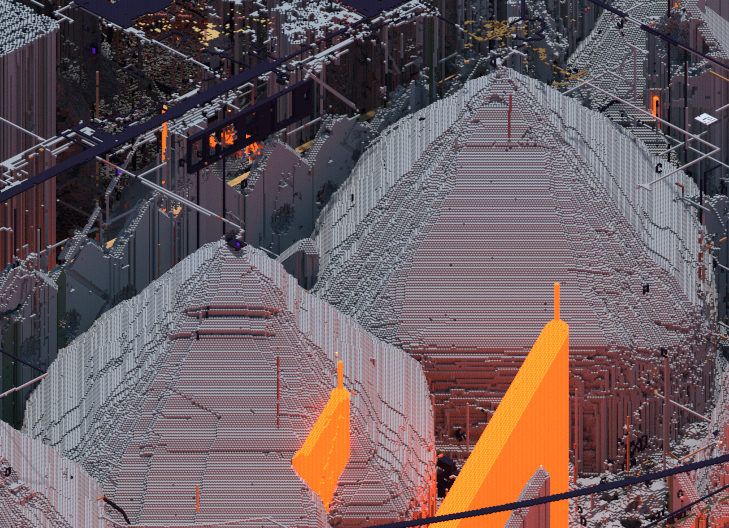
Two lavacasts produced to create artificial hills and uneven terrain. Among other uses, lavacasts can be built to block the way for new players from spawn (upper left) to the rest of the map (lower right). Also visible at lower right is an incomplete lava cast (currently covered in lava).

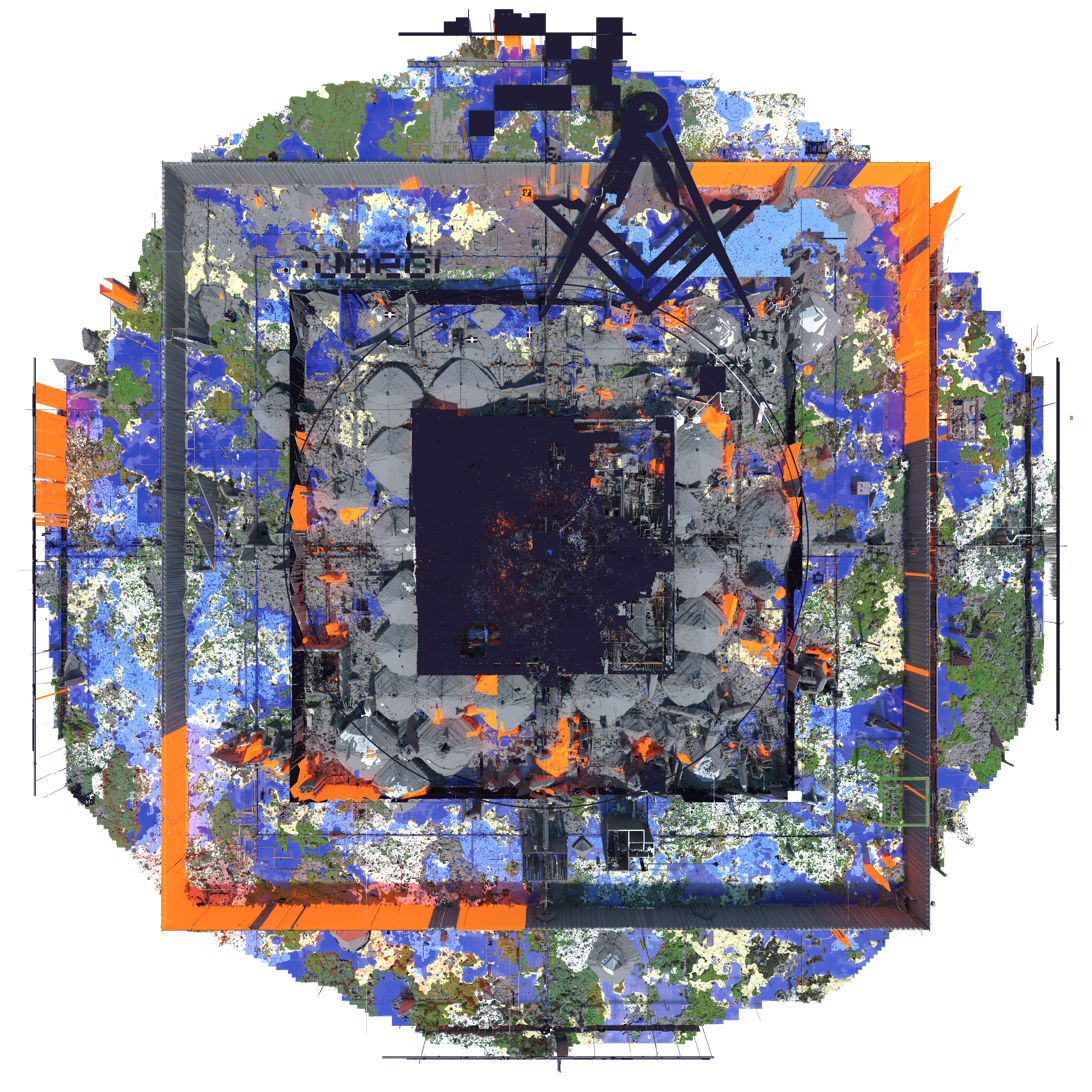
An aerial render of the spawn region in July 2019, centered on the middle of the map with a diameter of just over 4,000 blocks. The render displays the extreme amount of destruction and modification carried out to the terrain, including the construction of massive structures, such as the prominent Square and Compasses (upper right).

The culture of 2b2t, as well as Minecraft anarchy servers in general, is inhospitable and aggressive. Players usually need to hide supplies and be well armed to survive and can expect to be killed several times. This is exacerbated by the server being set to hard difficulty and player versus player combat being enabled, making survival considerably harder. Longtime players are often hostile to new players on the server, whom they often call "newfags". The server-wide chat often contains spam, trolling, and trash talking, as well as racial slurs, death threats, and Nazi propaganda. Links to obscene content and screamer videos are also common. Players lie to others with the intent of sending them to in-game locations with traps. A common rule among players is to not trust others.

Traps are deliberately placed surrounding the area where players first join the server: pits of lava, areas lit on fire, and portals that lead to lava or enclosed areas of obsidian that force players to disconnect and reconnect, waiting through the long queue again. Some players create large obstacles called "lavacasts", in which water and lava are repeatedly poured down staircases of stone, creating mountains of jagged cobblestone. These structures completely surround the spawn area, and many are as tall as the map's height limit.

There have occasionally been events in which dozens of players come together to take control of spawn for a time to build a large base, kill many new players, or destroy other bases, which were referred to as "spawn incursions". Inexperienced players may need many attempts and multiple hours to "escape" the spawn area, where resources have been consumed or destroyed for thousands of blocks in all directions. The most common cause of death is starvation from being unable to escape the spawn area. A player may last around 1,500 blocks of travel without food before dying of starvation without the help of hacks or glitches. Roisin Kiberd of Newsweek speculated that enduring the challenge may be part of the appeal of 2b2t: since "nobody survives for long, there is a pride in having died there."

Experienced players reside far away from the spawn area in relative safety to play the game and build. The map is less destroyed further away from spawn, allowing for natural trees, animals, and resources. Player-built roads called "highways" are often used to travel easily out from spawn. The server has no etiquette regarding ownership; anything that is built can be destroyed at any time if found by other players. This destruction, known as griefing, is so commonplace on the server that Brendan Caldwell of Rock, Paper, Shotgun described it as being "just a form of weather". Despite this culture of hostility and destruction, there is an event every April Fools' Day in which the server changes to a different map for a few days and players can come together and cooperate.

Players often make use of modified Minecraft clients incorporating cheats such as X-ray vision and automated pathfinding; these modifications are permitted by 2b2t's (lack of) rules. These clients help immensely in allowing the player to navigate the environment and survive. Players without these clients are at a significant disadvantage.

Because the server's map is over a decade old, 2b2t has developed an insular subculture with its own history and ethos. Martin Paul Eve, a researcher in digital humanities, found that the wiki documenting the history of 2b2t "refer to the in-game universe as though it were a totality". He likens it to resources documenting the Warez scene; they mingled with the subculture themselves and are difficult to understand without a direct experience.

== Reception ==
Both Robert Guthrie of Kotaku and Andrew Paul of Vice have called 2b2t the worst server in Minecraft. Paul called the server a "fantastical world of possibility and horror," and found that it functioned as a kind of virtual "id", representing an "unrestrained stream of populist consciousness". Brendan Caldwell of Rock, Paper, Shotgun described 2b2t as the game's "most obscene server." In June 2012, Craig Pearson of PCGamesN called it Minecraft's most offensive server, noting 2b2t's callousness and obscenity in the form of language, swastikas, and its hostile player base. In 2013, a PCGamesN article by Jeremy Peel reported on Minecraft's newly announced built-in server hosting service, Minecraft Realms, remarking that it would keep children away from 2b2t. In 2014, Tim Edwards wrote in a PCGamesN article addressing Microsoft about their purchase of Minecraft that they should not get "prissy" about player-made creations, stating that "2b2t is still an amazing achievement, with or without the swastikas."

In 2016, in both Newsweek and The Independent, Roisin Kiberd described 2b2t as a malevolent form of Minecraft, a place of beauty and terror. Kiberd called the server "hell", stating that it is "not safe for life", as the server gives "free rein to [players'] darkest impulses." Kiberd concluded that the main appeal of playing on the server comes from learning the possibilities of a server with few limits, as well as enduring its hostile environment. Kiberd also noted that there is a so-called "meta-narrative" above 2b2t, involving players using YouTube and Reddit to share analysis and commentary about in-server events. A 2013 IGN article and video listed 2b2t's spawn area as one of the six best things in Minecraft, describing the server as the "end boss" of Minecraft servers, a celebration of destruction and indifference. The article noted 2b2t's propensity towards griefing, the use of hacked clients, and player-built obscenities; and stated that players with thick skin should visit 2b2t at least once.

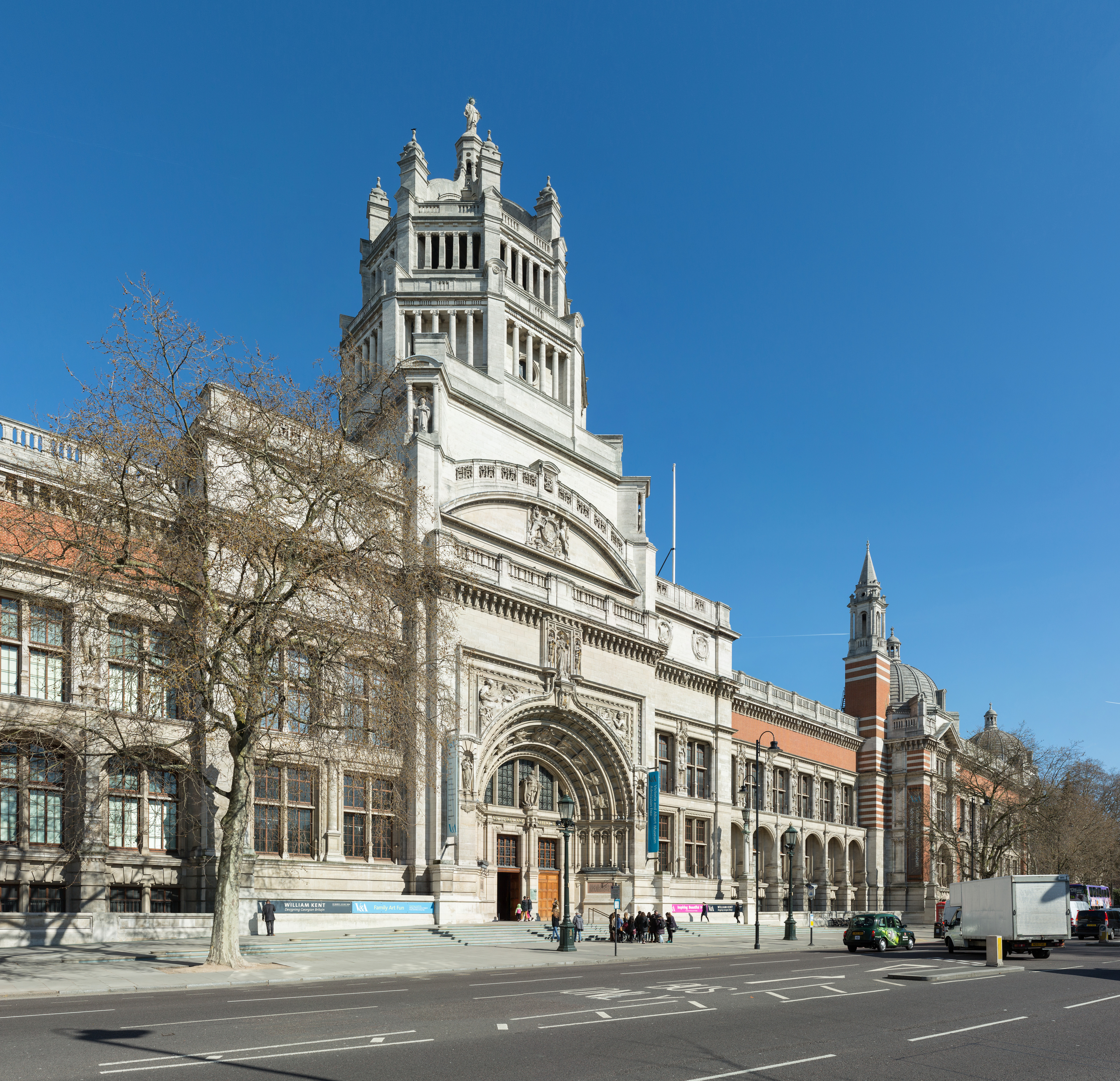
The Victoria and Albert Museum in London, where 2b2t featured from 2018 to 2019

From September 8, 2018, to February 24, 2019, 2b2t was featured in the Videogames: Design/Play/Disrupt exhibition of the Victoria and Albert Museum in London. The exhibition aimed to explore video games and their designing process, as well as how they captivate players and the social and ethical issues around them. Minecraft was heavily featured in the third section of the exhibition, which focused on games in which players "become creators and designers themselves, often as part of large online communities". 2b2t represented this aspect of Minecraft, which exhibited alongside 15 other video games. The server was described by Alex Wiltshire in the exhibition catalogue as "littered with archaeological remnants of its history... a palimpsest of a landscape, written over and re-written over by feuds between players, hacks injecting vast structures into the world, and by different waves of Internet communities arriving and rampaging or attempting to settle within it."

In Introduction to Game Design, Prototyping, and Development, published by Pearson Education in August 2017, 2b2t was described as being a "barren hellscape", with its nature being the "ultimate expression of the core mechanic of the game," referring to Minecraft's open-ended sandbox nature. The Ultimate Minecraft Creator, published by Triumph Books in July 2014, stated that despite 2b2t's offensive language and behavior, griefing, and cheating, the server can be a unique and fun experience for players who are willing to put up with its negative aspects.

2b2t also featured in an episode of the Swedish podcast P3 Spel (P3 Games) of Sveriges Radio, which described 2b2t as Minecraft's "most talked-about" server, and how, throughout its history, it has become the "witch's cauldron of chaos" it is today. Master Builder 3.0 Advanced and Ultimate Guide to Mastering Minigames and Servers, published by Triumph Books in April 2015 and April 2016 respectively, both stated that 2b2t "sits among online royalty when it comes to public [Minecraft] servers."

== Renders ==
A render of 2b2t's spawn region as of late 2017, displaying the various layers of spawn with progressive destruction proceeding inwards toward the center of the world. The render displays the -X (western) axis of the world map from 400 to 3,000 blocks from the map's center.

A render from the same perspective as of February 2020, which, in comparison to the render from 2017, shows how the destruction of the spawn area has greatly increased over time

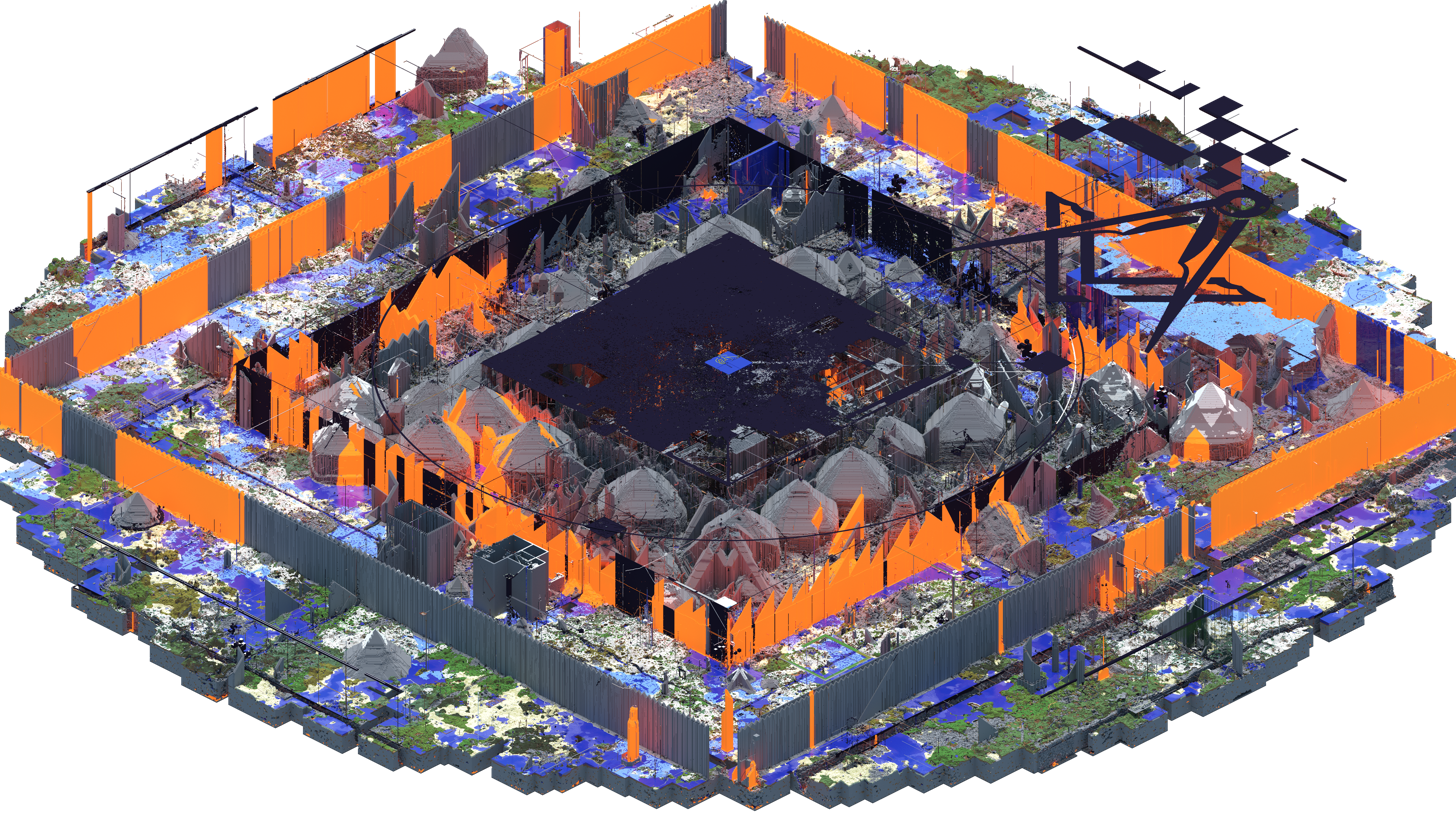
A render of 2b2t's spawn region as of June 2019, providing an alternative side view in an isometric projection of the render in the Culture section

A 2b2t map topdown render from May 2026
