= Turtling (gameplay) =

Defensive gameplay strategy

Turtling is a gameplay strategy that emphasizes heavy defense, with little or no offense. A player who turtles minimizes risk to themselves while baiting opponents to take risks in trying to overcome the defenses.

In practice, games are often designed to punish turtling through various game mechanics.

As a metaphor, turtling refers to the defensive posture of a turtle, which retracts its limbs into its hardened shell for protection against predators. A player who concentrates on defense is said to behave like a turtle, reluctant to leave the safety of its shell for fear of suffering a lethal attack.

== Fighting games ==
In the world of fighting games, especially those of the 2D variety, a turtle style of play is a defensive style that focuses on patience, positioning, timing, and relatively safe attack options to slow down the pace of the game and minimize the number of punishable mistakes made during the course of the match. This style can be very useful in timed matches, as it allows a player to deal a small amount of damage to an opponent, and then win the match by running down the clock. If available, players can turn off the timer to prevent such a strategy. Turtling can also be used to force an opponent into making punishable mistakes while minimizing the damage one takes. This is especially true when using projectile-heavy characters that are able to both maintain the pressure and stay out of harm's way. In a few other cases, turtling can be an effective strategy to minimize the offensive effects of temporary buffs.

Game mechanics can be designed specifically to discourage turtling. For example, super attack meters may build up faster when using aggressive attacks, and may even decrease as a result of blocking or not attacking. Games can also offer a greater variety of possible hit locations (e.g., utilizing mix-ups) that make it more difficult for a defender to successfully guess how to block or counter. Super Smash Bros. has a character's shield shrink as it is used and takes damage, but it will regenerate when not in use. It is also possible to "poke" shields, or hit vulnerable spots outside a character's shield while their shield is active, which is easier against smaller shields but can be circumvented by positioning the shield with the control stick. If the shield shrinks too much, it will shatter and stun the player for a short period of time. However, turtling is still possible because of various characters who rely heavily on projectiles.

== Real-time strategy games ==
A turtle strategy is commonly used in real-time strategy video games. When turtling, the player protects their territory, to the exclusion of creating forces for attacking the enemy. A turtling strategy may work because it forces the opponent to be more aggressive and constantly force him to attack the turtling player until the map is mined out, and the opponent does not have any resources to replenish their forces. The most common way to turtle is to build large numbers of towers, turrets, and other defensive structures to fire on enemy units. Turtle armies may also incorporate large groups of artillery units to extend effective range and prevent opposing artillery units from attacking with impunity.

The turtling strategy has some major weaknesses. First, many games have units which out-range defensive buildings (catapults, artillery, etc.) and/or short-range units which are fast enough and tough enough to rush the defenses. The turtling strategy may then collapse (especially if overly dependent on choke points) as the more aggressive player destroys one group of defenses, destroys resource-gathering and unit-building facilities in that area, and then attacks another set of defenses, etc. (assuming that the attacker has been building reinforcements in the meantime). Another serious weakness of turtling is that it prevents the turtler from spreading across the map to acquire additional resources, and therefore lets the enemy use these resources to build more and often better offensive units. The seriousness of this disadvantage varies: it is most serious on maps where there are many resource patches and few opponents competing for them.

Under competitive multiplayer conditions, starting resources are often limited, and the turtling strategy involves devoting them all to defense while disregarding other objectives, the most important of which usually being to attack and secure other sources of income. While the turtle builds up his defensive shell, the "attacker" is free to take control of the rest of the map, providing them with an abundance of resources with which to build up a large force (including artillery which can outrange defensive structures, and superweapons, if applicable) and invade from all sides.

== Turn-based strategy games ==
Turtling is also possible in TBS (turn-based strategy) games. It is probably best explained by a classic TBS game such as Risk. A player will simply accumulate armies in one place without attacking other players. As the game progresses, the turtle becomes stronger as other players will not risk attacking in fear of getting weak for no benefit. The turtle exploits the selfishness of other players to its advantage until it is powerful enough to start taking them out one by one. Solutions have been proposed to take the turtle out by cooperation as suggested by Ehsan Honary.

The situation is similar in resource-based games as well. TBS games have much more scope for research than most RTS (real-time strategy) games, so the objective is usually to spend the minimum of resources on combat units and to focus on research and economic development until the player is in a position to build a large force of advanced units.

== Tabletop miniature games and strategy board games ==
Turtling is also a strategy used in many non-computer games as well. In tabletop miniature combat games, victory may be determined by the amount of opposing units destroyed. By waiting for the opponent to make the first move, a tactical advantage can be gained in many systems. For this reason, many game systems have implemented a victory system involving territorial control to combat the effects of turtling. Turtling is also a strategy in many strategy board games, the strengths, and weaknesses of which are similar to those of turtling in real-time or turn-based computer strategy games.

== See also ==
- Camping (gaming)
