= Mineplex =

Minecraft minigame server

Mineplex Games LLC
- Developer: Mineplex Studios
- Type: Minecraft server
- Launched: January 24, 2013; 13 years ago June 12, 2026; 5 months ago (relaunch)
- Platforms: Minecraft: Java Edition; Minecraft: Bedrock Edition
- Status: Active (Note: Mineplex re-launched in Summer of 2026 under the new ownership team.)
- Website: mineplex.com

Mineplex is a Minecraft server created in 2013 by Gregory Bylos and Jarred van de Voort. The server was shut down on May 11, 2023. In 2016, Mineplex had millions of unique players monthly. At its peak, the server had around 20,000 concurrent players at any given time. Mineplex won the Guinness World Records award on January 28, 2015, for having 34,434 concurrent players, the most on a Minecraft server at the time. This record was later lost to Hypixel the same year. The server was later purchased, and relaunched in 2026.

Mineplex's popularity on the Java Edition of Minecraft rapidly declined after its peak years, while the Bedrock Edition counterpart averaged 4,000+ concurrent players. After years of decline, Mineplex abruptly ceased its operations on May 11, 2023.

Following the closure, former admin and Overwatch content creator Samito stated on social media that he had acquired Mineplex and plans on re-opening it sometime in the future. Mineplex underwent a rebuild and modernization effort. The Closed Beta began on August 9, 2024. Access to the server was locked behind a paywall, set to relaunch to the public sometime in the future.

On March 7, 2026, Samito announced in the Mineplex Discord server that he and the team had recognized that their strengths and the direction they were building toward, being a professional cloud infrastructure company, did not align with what long-time players expected or what Mineplex was historically. Samito passed the assets which were acquired by James, confident in his ability to build something memorable.

The same evening, James followed up with his own announcement stating that their goal was to fulfill the promise to bring Mineplex back as promised, and to build a community-driven server packed with both classic and modern content. Since then, many staff positions, social media content, and previews of the soon-to-return Mineplex server have been publicly shared.

== Features ==
The server's main features were its various minigames as well as its specially customized and heavily modded multiplayer maps. Players were also able to purchase items such as ranks that allowed for certain in-game abilities.

Following its relaunch, Mineplex announced the Mineplex studio, a development suite allowing for people to create their own minigames which would be hosted by Mineplex. Teams would be charged $15 per month for access and have the option to receive 35% of all revenue produced by their games.

== History ==
Mineplex launched with the goal of providing a large-scale multiplayer experience beyond traditional Minecraft gameplay. The server quickly gained attention for its custom minigames, including “Champs,” a capture-the-flag style game; “Minestrike,” a first-person shooter-inspired mode; and “Survival Games,” a Hunger Games-style mode. Its accessible interface, frequent updates, and active moderation contributed to its rapid growth.

=== Growth and popularity ===
Between 2013 and 2016, Mineplex expanded to support both Java Edition and Bedrock Edition of Minecraft. During this period, the server became a hub for competitive play, community events, and tournaments. Its network was praised for innovative minigame designs and for fostering a sense of community among players. Mineplex also attracted attention from content creators on platforms such as YouTube and Twitch, which helped further its reach and influence. Mineplex's ownership team, particularly Spu_, actively contacted Content Creators. By using this strategy, Spu_ managed to land a partnership with CaptainSparklez, who became a part of the ownership team and heavily promoted the server to his millions of fans.

=== Decline ===
Following its peak years, Mineplex experienced a gradual decline in player activity. Contributing factors included increased competition from rival Minecraft servers such as Hypixel, technical issues including server lag and exploits, and criticism from the community regarding monetization practices. The decline accelerated after 2020, with fewer updates and reduced engagement from long-time players. By 2023, the server struggled to maintain the same level of activity that had previously made it a global leader in the Minecraft community.

=== Closure ===
On May 11, 2023, Mineplex's website and game servers went offline without prior announcement. The sudden shutdown caused confusion and disappointment among the player base. A few days later, an official announcement on the server's Discord confirmed that the closure was permanent, citing operational challenges and financial sustainability concerns. The closure marked the end of an era for one of Minecraft's most influential servers.

=== Acquisition and revival ===
On May 27, 2023, former administrator and streamer Sam Dawahare, also known as “Samito,” acquired full ownership of Mineplex under Mineplex Studios LLC. The acquisition aimed to revitalize the server and preserve its legacy while modernizing its infrastructure. Under the new management, Mineplex announced plans to relaunch the network and introduce “Mineplex Studio,” a platform designed to allow community developers to create their own games and server experiences within the Minecraft ecosystem.

=== Relaunch ===
Mineplex entered a closed beta on May 2, 2025, reopening for both Java and Bedrock editions. Players had access to classic minigames such as “Champs” and “Minestrike,” alongside new maps, updated features, and social events designed to rebuild the community. The beta phase emphasized stability and performance improvements, with future plans for a public relaunch. As of late 2025, Mineplex was in closed beta, with ongoing development aimed at positioning the network as both a gaming server and a creative platform.

=== Current status ===
On March 7, 2026, Sam announced that he was giving control of Mineplex to "James", who is the former owner of Mineplex clone "Critz.gg" which went defunct shortly after acquiring the rights to Mineplex. According to the official Mineplex Discord, the new Mineplex team plans on reviving the server with Bedrock and Java support but primarily focus on Java Edition. Additionally many of the original games will be making a comeback with plans to tease more on their YouTube channel. Mineplex re-released to the public on Java Edition June 12, 2026.

== Awards and nominations ==
Award	Category	Performance	Date	Result	Ref.
Guinness World Records	Most Popular Minecraft Server Network	34,434	January 28, 2015	Won	
