= Autcraft =

Minecraft server for autistic children

- Website type: Minecraft server
- Founded: 23 June 2013 (13 years ago)
- Founder: Stuart Duncan
- Website: www.autcraft.com
- Users: 20,000 as of February 2026 (unique players)
- Launched: 2013

Autcraft is a Minecraft server dedicated to be a safe haven for people who have a diagnosis of autism and their families.

== History ==
Founded in 2013, Autcraft was the first Minecraft server created with autism in mind. It was founded by Stuart Duncan, a web developer in Timmins, Canada whose son is diagnosed with autism, and is known in-game as AutismFather. Autcraft was created so such children could play their favourite game with others without facing the threat of bullying and discrimination. Autcraft is administrated by neurodiverse and neurotypical adults with support from friends, family and other members of the server. As of February 2026, the server has over 20,000 whitelisted players.

When asked about the server, Duncan stated, "We just let them know that they're not alone... We're here for each other and will support each other for as long as need be... We all know how terrible it can feel sometimes and none of us want the others to feel that same way."

Autcraft was the subject of a 2015 conference paper by Ringland et al. in which empirical data was gathered from a digital ethnography of the server to explore how parents of autistic children continually create a "safe" virtual world through both implicit and explicit means.

In 2017, Duncan hosted a TEDx Talk discussing Autcraft, and how it has helped the autistic players.

== Gameplay ==
Autcraft's gameplay is mostly similar to vanilla (unmodded) Minecraft, however offers a variety of server plugins to facilitate moderation and enhance gameplay. Some modifications to normal Minecraft gameplay include: The addition of player-owned shops; the addition of ranks, which grant players additional commands; jobs, which provide online credit to buy ranks, and various social features. There are also regular events based around fighting various enemies within Minecraft, both from the unmodded game, and custom enemies that are specific to the server, which often drop rare cosmetic and functional items. These events, known as Darkness Fights or Wither Fights, require some collaboration as well as independent gameplay, which supports the neurodiverse player-base.

On April 2, 2026 (World Autism Awareness Day), the server moved onto a new spawn after four years, known simply as "Spawn 7". The spawn has a "steam punk" theme and was primarily designed so that everything a player would need (the world portals, the info and jobs area, as well as a warp to the shops at the previous spawn) is visible within the server's 10 chunk render distance. The new spawn makes use of the new /mannequin, /textdisplay and /itemdisplay plugins, introduced server-wide at the same time.

The socialisation on Autcraft encourages a supportive community, by rewarding players for good things, and supporting them when things go wrong. Every week, a "Player of the Week" (POTW) event is held, in which an outstanding player is selected and acknowledged. The server also celebrates many international events, such as New Year's Eve, Valentine's Day, Autism Acceptance, Easter, Pride Month, 4th of July, Thanksgiving, Christmas, Hannukah and Kwanzaa. There are some celebrations that are unique to the server as well, such as Stuart Duncan's Birthday or the anniversary of the server. Birthday celebrations for each player also take place.

There are eleven ranks on Autcraft. Whilst everyone who joins is given a default rank (known as Autcrafter), four ranks are available to purchase through the Autcraft online shop. On top of this, one rank is available via the Autcraft Patreon page, one rank can be applied for so that players can share their own YouTube links, and four ranks are given to players who help others in chat. The ranks bought through the online shop are named after ores that can be mined in Minecraft, and grant players with increasingly more powerful abilities in the game, such as healing or flight.

Following the server's publicity, many content creators known within gaming communities have visited the server, leading to the SpecialGuest rank. These visits are generally for large events, such as Autism Acceptance Day, or the server's anniversary. These include stampylongnose, Grian and the makers of the Hypixel server: Hypixel and NoxyD.

== Moderation & accessibility ==
There are three staff ranks on Autcraft: Helper, Senior Helper (known in game as SrHelper) and Admin. Unlike many gaming platforms, the staff of Autcraft don't apply for their roles, but are given them when they have shown to be responsible and helpful. Players must be 13 years of age to be considered for Helper rank, and 18 for SrHelper or Admin. Whilst the Buddy rank is also awarded by the staff to players, it is not a staff rank. As a result, players of all ages can be awarded the rank when they have demonstrated that they can be responsible and helpful. Players are awarded these ranks during the "rank-ups" section of Player Of The Week ceremonies. Rank-ups usually takes place every few months.

The moderation of Autcraft is thorough to ensure the safety of the players involved, many of whom are vulnerable, and to ensure the server is not targeted by bullying. The staff team are alerted (via the social media platform Discord) for many actions in game, such as writing signs or books, breaking blocks or conversations on the server. The server rules are clearly stated and enforced through reminders. Moderation focuses on preventing situations instead of reacting to them. For example, players builds are protected to stop theft or destruction. Limitations and sanctions are rarely used, only to disrupt harmful behaviour and not to punish players who may be overwhelmed due to their Autism. The server works collaboratively with players (and often their parents or guardians) to explain rules and ensure they can be enforced. To ensure that the server can be moderated effectively, the server language is English, but the server is available to any nationality.

Autism can occur with many other disabilities, including anxiety, sensory processing disorder, and various physical impairments. The Autcraft server allows and builds in accommodations that many other Minecraft servers would consider to be cheating, such as chat modifications, so they are available to players who need them. They also make use of an Augmentative and Alternative Communication (AAC) device to support players who may feel unable to speak in the main chat, or have a non-verbal form of autism. Many traits of autism are also considered, such as by having "Calm Rooms" for overstimulation, some of which provide grounding techniques, or "Spam Rooms" for hyperactivity.
