= Minecraft server =

Servers for the video game Minecraft

A Minecraft server is a player or business-owned multiplayer game server for the 2011 Mojang Studios video game Minecraft. In this context, the term "server" often refers to a network of connected servers, rather than a single machine. Players can start their own server either by setting one up on a computer using software provided by Mojang, or by using a hosting provider so they can have their server run on dedicated machines with guaranteed uptime. The largest server is widely accepted to be the minigame server Hypixel, and previously, Mineplex.

Minecraft multiplayer servers are controlled by server operators, who have access to server commands such as setting the time of day, teleporting players, setting the world spawn, and changing players' gamemode. The server owner (or users that have access to the live server files) can also set up and install plugins to change the mechanics of the server, and can also set up restrictions concerning which usernames or IP addresses are allowed or disallowed to enter the game server.

Multiplayer servers can have a wide range of activities, with some servers having unique premises and rules. Custom mods and plugins (server side mods) can be used with modified servers to allow actions that are not normally possible in the vanilla (unmodified) form of the game.

== History ==
=== Pre-release ===
Multiplayer was first added to Minecraft on May 31, 2009, in update 0.0.15a during the Classic phase of the game. The first server mods quickly began to arise around this time.

On September 3, 2010, work began on hMod, a notable mod which implemented an API for plugins which ensured they would remain compatible with each other provided they were using hMod. Several notable projects were created around this time for hMod, such as WorldEdit, some of which remains maintained for more modern platforms to this day.

Multiplayer for Minecraft's survival mode was released on August 4, 2010. The oldest server map is called "Freedonia", on the Minecraft server MinecraftOnline. The server and map were created within the first hour of Minecraft survival-mode multiplayer being released.

Following stagnation in the development of hMod, a spiritual successor called Bukkit would be created by a group of hMod developers: Nathan 'Dinnerbone' Adams, Erik 'Grum' Broes, Warren 'EvilSeph' Loo, Nathan 'Tahg' Gilbert, and sk89q. The project would begin work on December 21, 2010, and officially release in 2011. The project consisted of Bukkit, licensed under GPL, and CraftBukkit, licensed under LGPL. Notably, the licensing was not legally permissible due to the inclusion of proprietary code from Mojang.

On January 9, 2011, the first Minecraft server proxy, CraftProxy, would be created. It was a very basic proxy which primarily served to allow multiple servers to be run on the same computer with different ports.

=== Release and Bukkit era ===
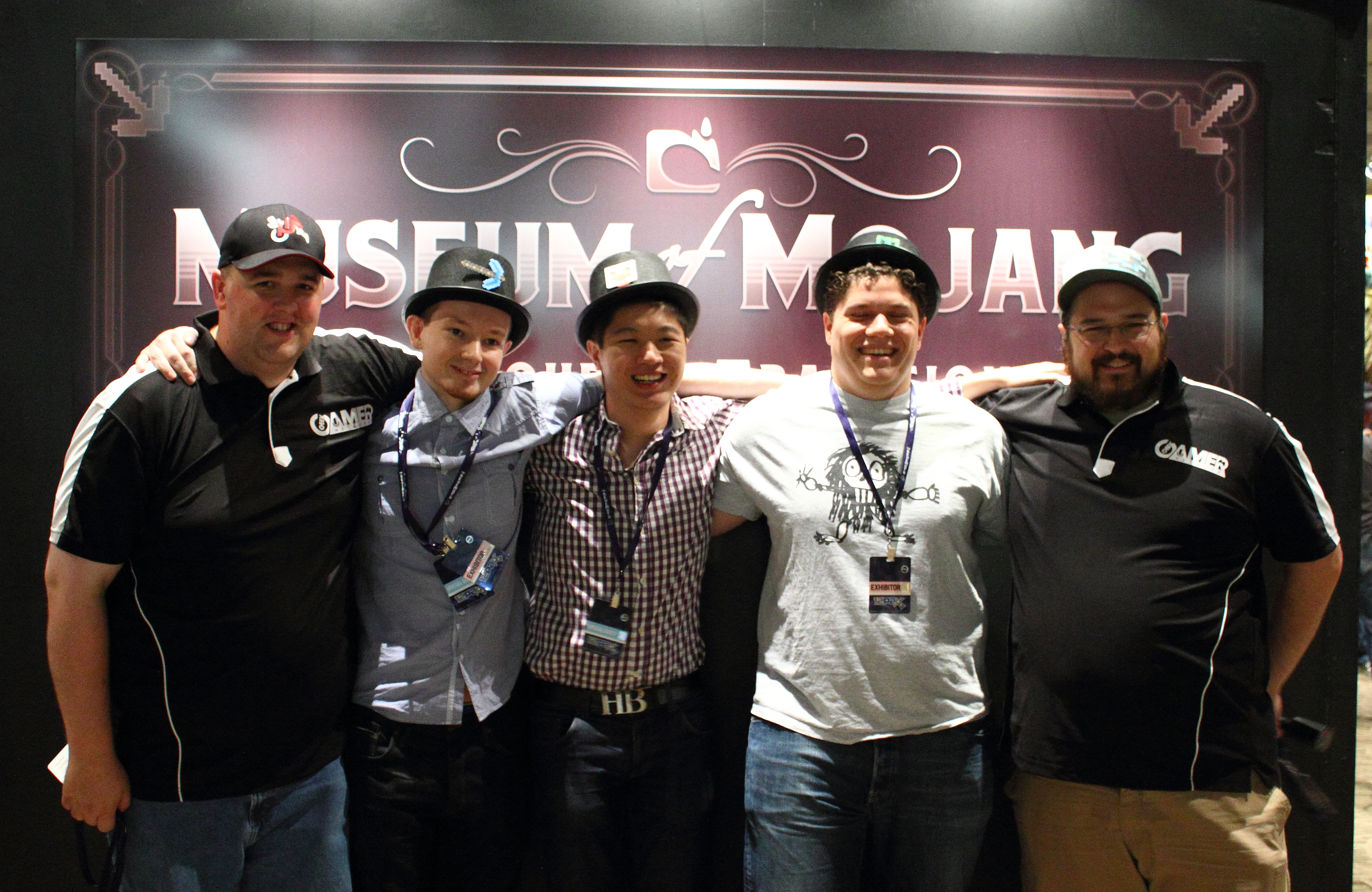
Three of Bukkit's founding developers, Nathan Adams (second from left), Warren Loo (center), and Eric Broes (second from right) at PAX Prime 2012.

In December 2011, Mojang and the founding Bukkit team would meet at Mojang's headquarters to discuss the potential of an official Minecraft modding API. On February 28, 2012, Mojang and Bukkit jointly announced that all founding members of the Bukkit project would be joining Mojang as employees to work on an official modding API (except for sk89q, who had left the project in early 2011). This would never be released, though the hired developers did make significant technical contributions in other ways.

In May 2012, a server implementation called CraftBukkit− would be created by a team including developer md_5. The name was a parody of its upstream project, the recently defunct fork of CraftBukkit called CraftBukkit++. The implementation would be rebranded to Spigot on January 15, 2013, as the project grew in size.

In August 2012, work began on a series of Minecraft server proxies by md_5 and Codename_B which were capable of facilitating the transfer of players between different servers connected to the proxy. This eventually culminated in a layer-7 proxy known as BungeeCord, which began development on October 4, 2012.

In 2013, Mojang announced Minecraft Realms, a server hosting service intended to enable players to run server multiplayer games easily and safely without having to set up their own. Unlike a standard server, only invited players can join Realms servers, and these servers do not use IP addresses. Since 2016, Realms have enabled Minecraft to support cross-platform play between Windows 10, iOS, and Android platforms. It is a subscription-based service, allowing for either three or eleven players in the realm at once depending on the subscription tier. While Realms can also be purchased on the Java Edition of the game, it does not enable cross platform play with Bedrock players.

On 14 June 2014, Mojang began enforcing the EULA of Minecraft: Java Edition to prevent servers from selling pay-to-win items in microtransactions, which many players thought unfairly affected gameplay. After this change, servers were only allowed to sell cosmetic items. Many servers closed shortly afterwards.

On June 23, 2014, the Paper project (originally PaperSpigot) would be launched by Z750 and gsand as a fork of Spigot following increased reluctance of Spigot to accept community contributions. The project would see many improvements in performance compared to Spigot. As of June 2025, the community-ran metrics platform bStats tracks an all-time record of over 130,000 Paper servers running concurrently, taking up over 60% of all server implementations stemming from the Bukkit ecosystem.

=== Post-Bukkit ===
On August 24, 2014, EvilSeph would announce the end of the Bukkit project, citing the legal grey area of the project as well as Mojang's new enforcement of the EULA. This would then be rebutted by Mojang employees over Twitter, who stated that the Bukkit Team had transferred their rights to the project to Mojang as part of their employment for the company. Developers Dinnerbone and Grum stated they would update Bukkit to the next version of Minecraft themselves, clarifying that Bukkit still was not going to be an official modding API. On September 5, 2014, a prominent Bukkit contributor identified as Wolvereness sent a DMCA takedown notice to GitHub to remove all of their contributions to Bukkit and its forks (including Spigot) due to copyright infringement caused by the inclusion of proprietary Mojang code in Bukkit. The project never received another update, effectively shutting it down.

Spigot would return with an updated version on November 28, 2014, following migration of code from GitHub to a self-hosted Stash server, the introduction of a Contributor License Agreement, and the development of build tooling designed to evade the DMCA takedown by providing build tools which added patches to a copy of Bukkit before the takedown instead of distributing pre-compiled binaries. This led to Spigot becoming the de facto successor to Bukkit.

On September 20, 2017, the "Better Together Update" was released for Bedrock codebase-derived editions of the game, which added cross platform multiplayer support, along with four featured servers: Lifeboat, Mineplex, InPVP and CubeCraft.

On July 27, 2022, player chat reporting was added as a part of "The Wild Update", 1.19.1. This allowed players to report abusive chat messages sent by other players directly to Mojang, and players could be banned from playing on multiplayer servers, including realms, as a whole for violating Microsoft's community standards.

On November 7, 2023, Mojang Studios, in partnership with GamerSafer, opened the official server list of Minecraft. Servers listed on the site can earn badges showing, for example, their commitment to safety and community management features, which are designed to give parents an indication of which servers offer the highest standards.

==== Entertainment Software Association controversy ====
On June 29, 2026, the Entertainment Software Association, more widely known as the ESA, were debating the Protect Our Games Act, a Californian law in progress to prevent game manufacturers from shutting down video games without a way to keep playing them, similar to the Stop Killing Games movement in Europe. During this debate which would decide whether the law would get passed or denied, the ESA Vice President of State Government Affairs, Jennifer Gibbons, argued that private servers in games such as Minecraft, Call Of Duty, and more were illegal black markets for piracy. Following the debate, the bill was denied by one vote, with 3 committee members voting for the act to be passed, 4 against it, and 4 abstaining from the vote.

This caused a stir in the gaming community, with many players arguing that private servers are not illegal piracy, and that this was misinformation fed to people who were not familiar with the concept. Some players even argued that this was misinformation because the EULA for Minecraft clearly stated private servers were allowed and encouraged. The ESA eventually sent out a response to multiple news outlets on this topic stating that the representative tried the best she could to answer a complicated multi-part question, and that the words community server and private servers were being used interchangeably.

== Management ==
Managing a Minecraft server can be a full-time job for many server owners. Several large servers employ a staff of developers, managers, and artists. Running a large server can be expensive for its operators, particularly those that have more than a thousand players. Expenses may include salaries, hardware, bandwidth, and DDoS protection. Dunbar stated that MCGamer, which has had over 50,000 daily players, has expenses that can be "well into the five-figure marks" per month. As of 2015, expenses of Hypixel, the largest server, are nearly $100,000 per month. Many servers sell in-game ranks, cosmetics and passes to certain minigames or gamemodes to cover expenses.

=== Technical aspects ===
For the Java Edition, Mojang release an official JAR file for server operators to run their servers with each game update. Third party server JARs also exist; typically utilizing resources more efficiently than the official server software and allowing the use of plugins. However, Minecraft servers have traditionally been restricted to running most operations on a single core (main thread) with a limited amount of other operations being able to be run asynchronously, making them inefficient for large player counts.

Minecraft: Java Edition uses the default port 25565 to listen to and accept new connections, whereas Minecraft: Bedrock Edition uses 19132 by default.

== Notable servers ==
The most popular server on Minecraft: Java Edition is Hypixel, which was released in April 2013 and has hosted tens of millions of unique players, making it one of the largest and most influential community-run servers in the game's history.

By the mid-2020s, Hypixel's founder reported that the server had surpassed 38.7 million lifetime unique players, while continuing to maintain some of the highest concurrent player counts in Minecraft multiplayer.

Other notable servers include 2b2t, the oldest anarchy server in Minecraft, Donut SMP, known for its in-game money system and for allowing PvP combat, Dream SMP, a private survival server that was owned by the YouTuber Dream, and Hermitcraft, an invite-only server where its members have built megabases, minigames, and redstone projects.

Guinness World Records has recognized the popularity of Minecraft servers by verifying server records, including for Hypixel, Mineplex, and amusement park recreations in MCParks, which includes replicas of Walt Disney World, Universal Studios Orlando, and Busch Gardens Tampa Bay.

Some large multiplayer networks have undergone significant changes in recent years. Mineplex, once one of the largest Minecraft servers by concurrent player count, officially shut down in May 2023 following a sustained decline in activity, marking the closure of one of the game's earliest major server networks. It has since relaunched under new leadership.

=== List ===
Bedrock Edition Mojang-featured server Bedrock Edition former Mojang-featured server

Name	Inception date	Notes	Ref.
2b2t	December 2010	Famously known as the oldest anarchy server in Minecraft; there is no official set list of rules, allowing the use of cheats and previously allowing obscene language in-game (changes have been made due to clashes with Mojang enforcement). Its map is one of the longest-running server maps in the game.	
Autcraft	June 23, 2013	Dedicated to be a safe haven for children with autism.	
Build the Earth	March 21, 2020	Dedicated to recreating the planet Earth in 1:1 scale, including man-made structures.	
CubeCraft Games	December 21, 2012	Started in 2012 in Java Edition, hosting a handful of minigames such as EggWars (MoneyWars), SkyWars and Lucky Islands. CubeCraft opened on Minecraft: Bedrock Edition in 2018 as a Mojang-featured Minecraft server.	
Donut SMP	December 3, 2023	A survival server created by the streamer and YouTuber DrDonut; known for its in-game money system and for allowing griefing, killing, and stealing among players. It is considered the second largest server by player count.	
Dream SMP	April 24, 2020	A private survival multiplayer server owned by the YouTuber Dream and played on by many prominent Minecraft content creators. It was divided into factions and included heavy roleplay, streamed live on YouTube and Twitch.	
Greenfield	2011	A creative server dedicated to building a 1:1-scale in-game city based on Los Angeles. It is known for its detailed building interiors, massive scale, and realistic terrain.	
The Hive	February 24, 2013	A minigame server created in 2012. Originally a Java server, it opened to Bedrock Edition in 2018 and has since become exclusive to Bedrock after closing its doors to Java players in April 2021 due to declining player-base interest.	
Hermitcraft	April 12, 2012	A private survival server known for the large-scale builds and redstone projects that its members (called Hermits) create. Operated by Xisumavoid, it features a diamond-based economy and trading system. As of 2026, it has 11 seasons.	
Hypixel	April 13, 2013	Minecraft's most popular server, founded by Simon Collins-Laflamme and Philippe Touchette, and contains a prominent number of game modes and minigames, many of which are centered around player-versus-player combat.	
MCC Island	June 20, 2023	A public Minecraft server featuring minigames inspired from MC Championship, a Minecraft YouTuber tournament organized by YouTuber Smajor1995.	
MinecraftOnline	August 4, 2010	Created in August 2010 and opened to the public after two days of testing, MinecraftOnline is the oldest survival server, containing the oldest running server map that has never been reset. Sources conflict on whether MinecraftOnline, Novylen, CFUK, or nerd.nu should be deemed the oldest Minecraft server.	
Mineplex	January 24, 2013	Formerly the largest Minecraft server, having a variety of minigames for players to experience. In 2015, it held a Guinness World Record for the most popular Minecraft server at the time. It was eventually overtaken as the most popular server by rival Minigame server Hypixel, leading to its eventual closure. Mineplex re-released in 2026.	
QSMP	March 22, 2023	A private multilingual survival server created by Quackity with live automatic translation.	
The Uncensored Library	March 12, 2020	A server and map released by Reporters Without Borders in an attempt to circumvent censorship in countries lacking freedom of the press. It has received significant press coverage.	
Wynncraft	April 2013	Created in April 2013 and made available to the public in just the next month, Wynncraft is a server that functions as a massively multiplayer online role-playing game.	
