= Griefer =

One who harasses other players in a game

The terrain in Minecraft server 2b2t, which has been griefed

A griefer or bad-faith player is a player in a multiplayer video game who deliberately annoys, disrupts, or trolls others in ways that are not part of the intended gameplay. Griefing is often accomplished by killing other players unnecessarily, destroying player-built structures, or stealing items. A griefer derives pleasure from the act of annoying other users, and as such, is a nuisance in online gaming communities.

== History ==
The term "griefing" was applied to online multiplayer video games by the year 2000 or earlier, as illustrated by postings to the rec.games.computer.ultima.online USENET group. The player is said to cause "grief" in the sense of "giving someone grief".

The term "griefing" dates to the late 1990s, when it was used to describe the willfully antisocial behaviors seen in early massively multiplayer online games like Ultima Online, and later, in the 2000s, first-person shooters such as Counter-Strike. Even before it had a name, griefer-like behavior was familiar in the virtual worlds of text-based Multi-User Domains (MUDs), where joyriding invaders inflicted "virtual rape" and similar offenses on the local populace. Julian Dibbell's 1993 article "A Rape in Cyberspace" analyzed the griefing events in a particular MUD, LambdaMOO, and the staff's response.

In the culture of massively multiplayer online role-playing games (MMORPGs) in Taiwan, such as Lineage, griefers are known as "white-eyed"—a metaphor meaning that their eyes have no pupils and so they look without seeing. Behaviors other than griefing that can cause players to be stigmatized as "white-eyed" include cursing, cheating, stealing, or unreasonable killing.

== Methods ==
Methods of griefing differ from game to game. What might be considered griefing in one area of a game may even be an intended function or mechanic in another area. Common methods may include, but are not limited to:

- Intentional friendly fire, or deliberately performing actions detrimental to other team members' game performance in primarily shooter games.
  - Wasting or destroying key game elements
  - Colluding with opponents
  - Giving false information
  - Giving information about your team's whereabouts to an enemy team
  - Faking extreme incompetence with the intent of hurting teammates, or failing an in-game objective
  - Deliberately blocking shots from a player's own team, or blocking a player's view by standing in front of them, so they cannot damage the enemy
  - Trapping teammates in inescapable locations by using physics props, special abilities, or teleportation
  - Intentionally killing oneself
- Actions undertaken to waste other players' time.
  - Playing as slowly as possible
  - Trapping and imprisoning players for extended periods of time to deny their ability to play on a server.
  - Hiding from an enemy when there is no tactical benefit in doing so
  - If a game interface element has no time limit, leaving their computer (going "AFK"), potentially forcing the other players to leave the game (which may incur a penalty for leaving), like Among Us.
  - Constantly pausing the game, or lowering its speed as much as possible, in the hopes that their target quits in frustration
  - Standing on top of important non-player characters (NPCs) to block other players from interacting with them.
  - A powerful player entering an area intended for lower-level or less experienced players and using up or hogging otherwise available limited resources, as can be sometimes seen in MMORPGs or grinding-based games
- Causing a player disproportionate loss or reversing their progress.
  - Destroying or vandalizing other players' creations without permission in sandbox games like Minecraft and Terraria
  - Driving vehicles backward around lapped courses in multiplayer racing games, often done with the intent of crashing head-on into whoever is in first place
- Using exploits (taking advantage of bugs in a game).
  - Illegally exiting a map's boundaries to prevent the enemy team from winning
  - In a co-op or multiplayer game, destroying or otherwise denying access to items, without which other players cannot finish the game
- Purposeful violation of server rules or guidelines.
  - Impersonation of administrators or other players through similar screen names
  - Written or verbal insults, including false accusations of cheating or griefing
- Abusing the in-game reporting system with mass reports to trigger a bot to automatically ban another player.
- Spamming a voice or text chat channel to inconvenience, harass, or annoy other players.
- Uploading offensive or explicit images to profile pictures, in-game sprays, or game skins.
- Kill stealing, denying another player the satisfaction or gain of killing a target that should have been theirs.
- Camping at a corpse or spawn area to repeatedly kill players as they respawn (when players have no method of recourse to prevent getting killed), preventing them from being able to play. Camping can also refer to continuously waiting in a tactically advantageous position for others to come to them; this is sometimes considered griefing because if all players do it, the game stalls, but this is now more commonly considered a game design issue, and in games where defeating a juggernaut is required, it is more likely that juggernaut will camp.
- Acting out-of-character in a role-play setting to disrupt the serious gameplay of others.
- Luring many monsters or a single larger monster to chase the griefer, before moving to where other players are. The line of monsters in pursuit looks like a train, and hence this is sometimes called "training" or "aggroing".
- Blocking other players so they cannot move to or from a particular area, or access an in-game resource (such as a non-player character); the game Tom Clancy's The Division was found to have a serious problem with this at launch, where griefers could stand in the doorway out of the starting area, trapping players in the spawn room.
- Intentionally attempting to crash a server through lag or other means (such as spawning large amounts of resource-demanding objects), to cause interference among players.
- In Catan (board game), repeatedly refusing to trade with another player, making plays which disproportionately harm a certain opponent's winning chances with no obvious benefit to themselves. Can also lead to a kingmaking scenario where a player is deliberately given the win, usually to spite another.
- Smurfing, the process of creating extra accounts and deliberately losing games to enter a lower skill rank than is appropriate, before playing at full skill against lower-ranked opponents, thus defeating them easily.
- High-skill players deliberately losing in matches against low-skill players (usually due to shortage of players), causing the low-skill player's skill rating to artificially rise so that they will be routinely pitted against opponents they have no chance of winning against in the future.
- Impersonating an enemy to trick someone into attacking the griefer, so that a player is flagged as having attacked the griefer. A notable example of this is early on in Ultima Online, where players had a scroll that could change their appearance to that of a monster, with the only way to tell the difference between them and a real monster being to click on them and read their name. Attacking a monster-disguised griefer would flag the player as a murderer, causing the town guard to kill the player.
- Starting a vote to kick someone in hopes of others blindly agreeing to do so, so that the griefer faces no repercussions while other players have unwittingly gotten rid of an innocent person.

The term is sometimes applied more generally to refer to a person who uses the internet to cause distress to others as a prank, or to intentionally inflict harm, as when it was used to describe an incident in March 2008, when malicious users posted seizure-inducing animations on epilepsy forums.

== Industry response ==
Many subscription-based games actively oppose griefers, since their behavior can drive away business. It is common for developers to release server-side upgrades and patches to annul griefing methods. Many online games employ gamemasters that reprimand offenders. Some use a crowdsourcing approach, where players can report griefing. Malicious players are then red-flagged and are then dealt with at a gamemaster's discretion. As many as 25% of customer support calls to companies operating online games deal specifically with griefing.

Blizzard Entertainment has enacted software components to combat griefing. To prevent non-consensual attacks between players, some games such as Ultima Online have created separate realms for those who wish to be able to attack anyone at any time, and for those who do not. Others implemented separate servers.

When EverQuest was released, Sony included a PvP switch where people could fight each other only if they had enabled that option. This was done in order to prevent the player-killing that was driving people away from Ultima Online, which at that time had no protection on any of its servers.

Second Life bans players for harassment (defined as being rude or threatening, making unwelcome sexual advances, or performing activities likely to annoy or alarm somebody) and assault (shooting, pushing, or shoving in a safe area, or creating scripted objects that target another user and hinder their enjoyment of the game) in its community standards. Sanctions include warnings, suspension from Second Life, or being banned altogether.

Eve Online has incorporated activities typically considered griefing into the gameplay mechanisms. Corporate spying, theft, scams, gate-camping, and PvP on non-PvP players are all part of the gaming experience. This does not mean that the developers are indifferent to the negative effect that these activities may have on players; it is simply their choice with regard to the culture and atmosphere that they intended for the game. Players are advised to approach unfamiliar situations in the game with an appropriate level of caution, develop strategies to deal with the presence of these elements, and take personal responsibility for their in-game actions. Certain activities are allowed by the developers, but are still considered illegal in the game itself and result in in-game consequences, such as the unavoidable loss of the attacker's ship when engaging in combat with a non-allowed target in high-security space.

Shooters such as Counter Strike: Global Offensive have implemented peer review systems, where if a player is reported too many times, multiple higher-ranked players are allowed to review the player and determine if the reports are valid, and apply a temporary ban to the player's account if necessary. The player's name is omitted during the replay, as well as those of the other 9 players in the game. In October 2016, Valve implemented a change that will permanently ban a player if they receive two penalties for griefing.

Many Minecraft servers have rules against griefing. In Minecraft freebuild servers, griefing is often the destruction of another player's build, and in other servers the definition ranges, but almost all servers recognize griefing as harassment. Most servers use temporary bans for minor and/or first-time incidents, and indefinite bans from the server for more serious and/or repeat offences. While many servers try to fight this, other servers, like 2b2t, allow griefing as part of the gameplay.

By the early 2020s, Grand Theft Auto Online had experienced a drastic increase in griefing, due in part to the emergence of bugs and better money-making opportunities. Common griefing techniques within the game abuse passive mode and trivially accessible weaponized vehicles. Developer Rockstar has implemented measures such as a longer cool-down on passive mode, patching invincibility glitches, and removing passive mode from weaponized vehicles in recent updates. In addition, the game also features a reputation system that, in effect, after excessive "bad sport point" accumulation, will mark players as "bad sports", allowing them to only play in lobbies with other "bad sports". Such points are either accumulated over time or gained within a certain time frame and are acquired by actions such as destroying another player's personal vehicle or quitting jobs early. This is one of the more controversial features of the game, as some point out flaws such as the game not considering if destruction of a vehicle was self-defense.

Bethesda Softworks Games, a division of ZeniMax Media Inc., has a clear code of conduct that does not allow griefing, as indicated in section 3.2. Whether this has any effect is debatable, with numerous forum posts about ongoing griefing behaviour. Because the boilerplate response to generating a ticket about such a player contains the clause "Please note, to protect individual privacy, we do not disclose the outcome of our investigation.", there is no transparency to indicate whether violations of the code of conduct (by griefing) are taken seriously by Bethesda/ZeniMax.

Fallout 76 attempted to discourage players from griefing by marking them as wanted criminals, for which one can get a reward for killing. Wanted players cannot see any other players on the world map, and must rely on their normal player view. However, this has instead become another mechanism to engage in griefing by luring other players into PvP, in which they largely have no chance to survive because of the perk loadout and weapons used by the griefer. An example of this is by breaking resource locks in a player camp, which will make the griefer wanted, with the hope that the camp owner will find them to retaliate, and thereby initiate PvP with the griefer.

== See also ==
- 2b2t
- Aimbot
- Anti-social behaviour
- Dark triad
- Glossary of video game terms
- Internet troll
- Leeroy Jenkins
- Lulz
- Online harassment
- Schadenfreude
- Spamming
- Video game exploit
- Scorched earth
