= Marie Foulston =

Independent video games curator

Marie Foulston (born 1982 or 1983) is an independent video games curator. From 2015 to 2019, she was the first curator of video games at the Victoria and Albert Museum, organising the museum's first major exhibition on video games, Videogames: Design/Play/Disrupt (2018–2019).

In 2011, Foulston co-founded the UK indie game collective The Wild Rumpus, which organised international events showcasing indie games to different types of audiences.

== The Wild Rumpus ==
Foulston held jobs in film and literature and was a producer at Penguin Books before she co-founded the London-based indie game collective The Wild Rumpus in 2011. According to the group's website, Foulston, and co-founders Ricky Haggett, Richard Hogg, and v buckenham, were motivated by a desire to expose indie games to unfamiliar audiences and "to turn traditional perceptions of videogames on their head." The Wild Rumpus held parties in London, Toronto, and San Francisco, among other cities, intended to bring people together to play social and physical multiplayer video games in a nightclub environment. The group hosted more than ten events; on one occasion, it held a Johann Sebastian Joust tournament in a Cold War-era fishing vessel.

== Victoria and Albert Museum ==
After a Victoria and Albert Museum (V&A) curator viewed Foulston's presentation at the Game Developers Conference in 2014 on "Curating Video Game Culture", she went on to join the museum in the following year as its first curator of video games. Foulston worked on the museum's Rapid Response collection, which contains newer objects of creative or cultural importance. She was lead curator of the museum's first major exhibition on video games, Videogames: Design/Play/Disrupt, held from September 2018 to February 2019, which examined eight video games from the 2000s onward, a time period when it began to get easier for more people to design, distribute, and play video games due to advances in technology. Concept art, game prototypes, and larger installations were divided into the three sections: the "Design" section showcased interesting examples of video game design; "Disrupt" examined video games that provide commentary on social and political issues and push for change; and several short films on the video game community made up the "Play" section. Foulston and Kristian Volsing edited a collection of essays to accompany the exhibition.

In a review of Videogames in The Times, Tom Whipple wrote that the exhibition went "some way" in giving the "oft‑derided art" the attention it deserves, though he felt it lacked more popular video games. The Daily Telegraph art critic Mark Hudson gave the exhibition three out of five stars, and criticised the exhibition's lack of interactivity and focus on the "politically aware cutting-edge" of video games. Hudson felt that, despite the shortcomings, the exhibition was a "visually spectacular, mind-opening view" into an "alien world" for a "games sceptic" like himself. The Guardian video games editor Keza MacDonald gave the exhibition five stars, writing that the exhibition showcases video games not as media outlets have traditionally viewed them, but as gamers have, as a "multifarious art form" and "force for change."

Foulston left the V&A in 2019.

== Independent curator ==
Foulston was a panel speaker at the experimental games festival, Now Play This, held at Somerset House in 2019, and was named guest director of its 2020 iteration.

Foulston directed a documentary, The Grannies, created with content from Red Dead Redemption 2. In a format similar to a travel documentary, The Grannies follows a group of Melbourne artists exploring places in the game that the game developer did not intend players access. Originally commissioned for Now Play This 2020 in the format of a "multi-channel installation film", it was screened as a short film at the 2021 International Documentary Film Festival Amsterdam, the London Short Film Festival, and the Milan Machinima Festival, due to the COVID-19 pandemic. The ACMI in Melbourne, Australia, exhibited the documentary in its original format in 2022.

In May 2020, during the worldwide COVID-19 lockdowns, Foulston organized a "Party in a Shared Google Doc". Writing in Dezeen magazine, historian Holly Nielsen found Foulston's event to be a good example of people "repurposing existing software and systems to provide ways of interacting with each other that are more tailored to their own social needs."
