= Experience point =

Role-playing game unit for measuring a character's progress

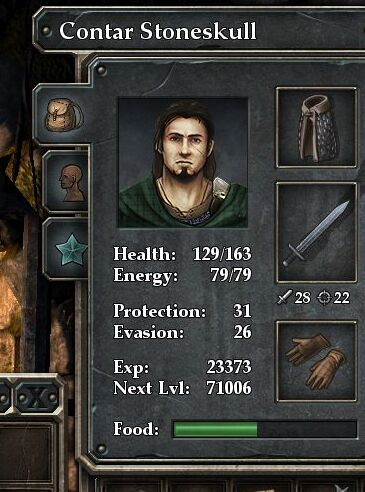
A character in the roleplaying video game Legend of Grimrock who has 23373 experience points: this character needs 71006 points to reach the next level

An experience point (exp or XP) is a unit of measurement used in some tabletop role-playing games (RPGs) and role-playing video games to quantify a player character's life experience and progression through the game. Experience points are generally awarded for the completion of objectives, overcoming obstacles and opponents, and successful role-playing.

In many RPGs, characters start as fairly weak and untrained. When a sufficient amount of experience is obtained, the character "levels up", achieving the next stage of character development. Such an event usually increases the character's statistics, such as maximum health, magic and strength, and may permit the character to acquire new abilities or improve existing ones. Levelling up may also give the character access to more challenging areas or items.

In some role-playing games, particularly those derived from Dungeons & Dragons, experience points are used to improve characters in discrete experience levels; in other games, such as GURPS and the World of Darkness games, experience points are spent on specific abilities or attributes chosen by the player.

In most games, as the difficulty of the challenge increases, the experience rewarded for overcoming it also increases. As players gain more experience points, the amount of experience needed to gain abilities typically increases. Alternatively, some games keep the number of experience points per level constant but progressively lower the experience gained for the same tasks as the character's level increases. Thus, as the player character strengthens from gaining experience, they are encouraged to accept new tasks that are commensurate with their improved abilities in order to advance.

== History ==
The term "experience point" was introduced by Gary Gygax and Dave Arneson in the creation of Dungeons & Dragons. Arneson introduced a level-up system while playing a modification of Chainmail, for which Gygax was a co-author. Dungeons & Dragons needed an abbreviation for "experience point", but EP was already in use for "electrum pieces", part of the currency system. One of TSR's first hires, Lawrence Schick, suggested the abbreviation to XP, to help Gygax complete the game manuals before release.

== Types ==
Some games use hybrid advancement systems that combine elements from more than one of the following types.

=== Level-based progression ===
In many role-playing games, such as games derived from Dungeons & Dragons (D&D), an accumulation of a sufficient number of experience points (XP) increases a character's "level", a number that represents a character's overall skill and experience. To "level" or "level up" means to gain enough XP to reach the next level. By gaining a level, a character's abilities or stats increase, making the character stronger and able to accomplish more difficult tasks, such as safely battling stronger enemies, gaining access to more powerful spells or combat techniques, or resolving more difficult social challenges.

Typically, levels are associated with a character class, and many systems allow combinations of classes, allowing a player to customize how their character develops.

Some systems that use a level-based experience system also incorporate the ability to purchase specific traits with a set amount of experience. For example, D&D 3rd Edition bases the creation of magical items around a system of experience expenditure (known as burning xp). The d20 System introduced the concept of prestige classes, sets of mechanics, character developments, and requirements that can be leveled up.

Some games have a level cap, or a limit of levels available. For example, in the online game RuneScape, no player can exceed level 120, which requires 104,273,167 experience points to gain, nor can any single skill gain more than 200 million experience points. Some games have a dynamic level cap, where the level cap changes over time depending upon the level of the average player.

=== Activity-based progression ===
In some systems, such as the classic tabletop role-playing games Traveller, Call of Cthulhu and Basic Role-Playing, and the role-playing video games Dungeon Master, Final Fantasy II, The Elder Scrolls, the SaGa series, and Grandia series, character progression is based on increasing individual statistics rather than general experience points. Skills and attributes grow through exercised use.

=== Free-form advancement ===
Free-form advancement is used by many role-playing systems including GURPS, Hero System or the World of Darkness series. It allows the player to select which skills to advance by allocating "points". Each character attribute is assigned a price to improve, so for example it might cost a character 2 points to raise an archery skill one notch, 10 points to raise overall dexterity by one, or it might cost 20 points to learn a new magic spell.

Players are typically free to spend points however they choose. Some games simplify free-form advancement by offering packages or templates of pre-selected ability sets.

=== Cash-in advancement ===
A cash-in experience advancement system uses experience points to "purchase" character advancements such as class levels, skill points, new skills, feats, and base attribute points. Each advancement has a set cost in experience points with set limits on the maximum bonuses that can be purchased at a given time, usually once per game session. Once experience points are used, they are erased or marked as spent from the character record and cannot be used again. Final Fantasy XIII and Warhammer Fantasy Roleplay are examples of games that use a cash-in advancement system.

== Video games ==
Since many early role-playing video games are derived from Dungeons & Dragons, most use a level-based experience system.

In many games, characters must obtain a minimum level to perform certain actions, such as wielding a particular weapon, entering a restricted area, or earning the respect of a non-player character. Some games use a system of "character levels", where higher-level characters hold an absolute advantage over those of lower level. In these games, statistical character management is usually kept to a minimum. Other games use a system of "skill levels" to measure advantages in terms of specific aptitudes, such as weapon handling, spell-casting proficiency, and stealthiness. These games allow the players to customize their characters to a greater extent.

Some games, particularly MUDs and MMORPGs, place a limit on the experience a character gains from a single encounter or challenge, to reduce the effectiveness of power-leveling.

=== Perks ===
"Perks" are special bonuses that video game players can add to their characters to gain special abilities. The term refers to the general usage of "perk" as an abbreviation of "perquisite". Perks are permanent rather than temporary and are progressively unlocked through experience points. The first video game to use the term "perks" to refer to such a mechanic was the 1997 role-playing video game Fallout.

Besides RPGs, perks have been used in various other video games in recent times, including first-person shooters such as Call of Duty 4: Modern Warfare (2007), Call of Duty: Modern Warfare 2 (2009), and Killing Floor (2009), as well as action games such as Metal Gear Online (2008).

=== Remorting ===
"Remorting" (also known as "rebirth", "ascending/ascension", "reincarnating", or "new game plus") is a game mechanic in some role-playing games. Once a character reaches a specified level limit, the player can elect to start over with a new version of the character. The remorting character generally loses all levels, but gains an advantage that was previously unavailable, such as access to different races, avatars, classes, skills, or otherwise inaccessible play areas within the game. A symbol often identifies a remorted character.

The term "remort" comes from MUDs. In some MUDs, players may become immortal characters—administrative staff—simply by advancing to the maximum level. These users are generally expected to distance themselves from gameplay, and interaction with players may be severely limited. When an immortal chooses to vacate this position to resume playing the game—usually from level one just as with any new character—he or she is said to have remorted, "becoming mortal again".

=== Grinding ===
Grinding refers to the process of repeating one specific activity over and over. This is done, for example, by repeatedly participating in challenges, quests, tasks and events which reward experience points for performing repetitive, often menial challenges. This definition can also be used in multi-player games, but it is typically displaced by a much more charged meaning. A term intended to describe this style of play without pejorative connotation is optimization, also known as "XP farming".

=== Power-leveling ===
Power-leveling is using the help of a stronger player to level a character more quickly than would be possible alone.

=== Sharing ===
Games that allow several characters to participate in a single event (such as battle or quest completion), implement various methods of determining how and when experience gets shared between participants. These methods include: only awarding experience to the character whose hit killed the enemy (as in Fire Emblem series); sharing experience among characters (as in D&D); and giving experience based on each character's actions (as in Final Fantasy Tactics). In some online games (for example Dungeon Defenders), it is possible to join a group and gain experience while providing little or no contribution to the group. This type of behavior is referred to as leeching. In games that allow players to gain rewards by kill stealing, this is also considered a form of leeching.

=== Botting ===
Some players of online games use automated programs known as bots to grind or leech for them in order to progress with minimal effort. This practice often violates the terms of service. Bots are also commonly used in commercial operations in order to powerlevel a character, either to increase the sale value of the account, or to allow the character to be used for commercial gold farming.

== See also ==
- Grinding (gaming)
- Virtual economy
- Virtual world
