= Gold sink =

Video game mechanic

Gold sink is an economic process by which a video game's ingame currency ('gold'), or any item that can be valued against it, is removed. This process is comparable to financial repression in real economies. Gold sink are most commonly used in the role-playing game and massively multiplayer online game genres. The term is comparable to timesink, but usually used in reference to game design and balance, commonly to reduce inflation when commodities and wealth are continuously fed to players through sources such as gold taps; such as quests, looting monsters, or minigames.

== Overview ==
The economy of such games typically involves players gathering gold from playing the game, which they then use to purchase items or services, or trade with other players. Gold sinks serve to decrease the total amount of gold players have, since without sinks, there will be inflation. Gold sinks are commonly called drains or gold drains. They can also be associated with item drains. For example, in Ultima Online, items that were placed on the ground would be gathered by the server. This form is referred to as decay or garbage collection.

Economies in virtual worlds operate very differently from those in the real world. Passive gold sinks may be in operation at all times to slowly extract value from the game. Players are usually more willing to accept this method of sinking. Passive sinks would be item degradation, consistent taxes, or decay. Active sinks are aggressive actions by the programmers to remove excessive value. These can be changes in the severity of the passive sinks, such as higher taxes or faster decay. But more effectively, an active sink can be the selling of unique items whose intrinsic values are much lower than the selling price sold by NPC vendors. Zack Booth Simpson cites one example in Ultima Online when the NPC vendors carried blue tinted armor that couldn't be made by players. Blue armor prices could be much higher, but decayed and degraded just like any other piece of armor.

Another improvement to active sinking is to couple it to a feedback control system. Such systems can be designed to maintain a set of prices or asset ratios, and if properly set up can add a great deal of price stability to a virtual economy; one example of this can be found in the MMO MUD Alter Aeon. The feedback control system used in Alter Aeon works by tracking the total amount of money in the game in order to dynamically adjust drop rates and shop prices. Players with more than 1 million in currency are taxed for 2% of the money they own over that limit. This keeps the economy permanently stable. The peaks in the total amount of in-game currency do not vary more than 10% in a time period of 2 years.

=== Resource flow ===
Depending on how resources are created and where resources go once destroyed, gold sinks are classified differently. There are two major types of resource management: linked and unlinked. Several aspects can be linked while others can be unlinked.

==== Linked ====
Linked resource flow means that the head is connected to the tail. All things have a resource intrinsic value. A deer may be worth three pieces of meat and two yards of leather. A sword can be worth three units of iron. When a resource such as a sword is destroyed through garbage collection, those three units of iron will go back into the mines of the virtual world for extraction. This is essentially no different from melting the sword down for the raw metal. A few steps of procurement are skipped, but essentially it's the same.

A strong linked system would have a governing equation for NPC vendors to follow. NPCs would be restricted to craft with the resources they have in stock. Player character Jake could sell the town vendor a sword for 10 gold. If Jake wanted to purchase gauntlets (let us assume gauntlets have a resource value of two units of iron), he could for 12 gold. The town vendor has made a 2 gold and 1 unit of iron profit off the transaction. Should another player character want to purchase something, the new character could only buy items that have a 1 unit of iron resource value or he could sell an item, let us say 1 leather and 1 iron, to now be able to purchase items that have a resource value equal to or less than 2 units of iron and 1 unit of leather.

To be a total linked system, NPCs would be programmed to break even or make small profits. Some virtual worlds may opt to leave NPCs unrestricted as to how much money they give out.

==== Examples ====
The intended purpose of gold sinks is to remove currency from the game, as excess currency leads to inflation of player driven prices. Game designers must balance between scarcity of currency and ease of acquiring currency.

Greater methods of currency spending can be implemented when players accumulate more wealth than intended. One example is Ultima Online; after the Renaissance expansion, players could earn money without fear of loss, due to the implementation of non-player versus player areas. As currency entered the economy at a greater pace, new "luxury" items were sold at high prices for the purpose of reducing large sums of money.

In Kingdom of Loathing, the massive acquisition of "meat" (the currency of the game) through exploitation of bugs led to the implementation of new high priced items that gave no in-game benefits (simply rare collectibles) to the player to eliminate excess currency.

In RuneScape, the Construction skill can be seen as a gold sink. This skill allows players to spend money on building a house. This way, money is taken out of the game, without players obtaining any tradeable items. Unique to Old School RuneScape is a literal Gold Sink the player can build in their kitchen, requiring materials totalling hundreds of millions of in game currency to create.

Other forms of gold sinks include:

- Quests requiring a certain amount to continue with the task at hand. This is offset by quest rewards and items that may be resold.
- Fees associated with NPC services and tasks.
- Fees associated with travel and convenience.
- Crafting, often requiring an initial investment and a continued chance of failure. Items may be crafted at a loss to increase crafting skill.
- Auction House Taxes

== See also ==
- Gold farming
