= Camping (video games) =

Video gaming tactic where a player obtains an advantageous static strategic position

In video gaming, camping is a tactic where a player obtains an advantageous static position, which may be a discreet place which is unlikely to be searched. The tactic is employed both in single-player games and online multiplayer games, but is usually more effective in an online multiplayer game, as AI opponents in single-player games may be aware of the player's position, even if they are visually hidden. The tactic varies depending on the type of game (online text adventure, graphical MMO, first-person shooter, etc.). In first-person shooters, it generally involves a player waiting in one location for other players to approach, then killing them (or performing some other action which is detrimental to the other players, depending on the game in question) before being noticed, or before the other players can react to their presence. By camping, a player is able to learn and adapt to the limited environment they are playing in, noting specific points to check repetitively. By following this method with little fault, a lower number of deaths can be achieved. In other cases, players may wait in an area to gain access to items or perform actions before other players who are not camping have the chance to do so.

Since camping is often seen as a method for circumventing much of the effort usually required to acquire a desired reward, the activity is contentious. Among many players, camping is considered very similar to cheating, especially in deathmatch-type first-person shooter games. The most common reason for this is that if every player camps, there may be no opportunities for players to come into conflict, and thus there will be no game at all.

Multiple players camping in mutually supportive positions is referred to in some types of games as turtling.

== Camping in first-person shooters ==
Camping often provides a clear field of view over a choke point or position of tactical interest whilst retaining cover for the camper. This tactic allows one player to easily pick off any opponent that comes into sight before the opponent is aware of their presence in the area. It differs from holding a strategic position by its requisite static nature and intensive cover. More experienced players are sometimes "semi-mobile campers/snipers" that leave boobytraps and relocate after gaining a few kills to prevent retaliation.

It often proves frustrating, particularly to newer players, as it rewards those who invest a considerable amount of time in the game (which allows them to know the layout of the maps and the best defensive positions), as well as those with accurate aim, whilst surprising the victim player and potentially killing them without having a potential chance to react to such attacks.

In most deathmatch-type games that have both a time limit and a kill limit, camping can be used to take advantage of the time limit rather than the kill limit. Capture the Flag and its variants provide an incentive to invade enemy territory, regardless of the risk, since scoring flags is more important than scoring by killing the opposing team's players; conversely, this mode also encourages players to camp their own vulnerable flag to defend against the anticipated stream of attackers. However, even in such games, some players may choose to camp to give covering fire for other team members attempting to grab the flag and run back with it.

It is most common in first-person shooters when a player hides in a single location which serves as a tactical advantage over the opposing player(s) for long periods of time. The position chosen is normally secluded from casual view and may be partially secured at least on one side by any object. The location is then used to create an ambush. The period of time a camping player spends in the specific location may vary as the player reacts to game conditions. Some games will discourage camping by nagging players who remain stationary for a time to move on, or applying harsher penalties to alleged campers such as small amounts of periodic damage (which, if ignored, will eventually kill the player and force them to respawn elsewhere).

In some games such as Blacklight: Retribution, players are given a way to combat camping. All players have what is known as a 'Hyper-Reality Visor' (HRV) which enables them to see, among other things, players through walls. Usage of the HRV is limited and players cannot use their weapons when it is engaged. This feature allows players to know where possible campers are and allows for faster gameplay. The HRV can be combated by certain equippable items however, such as a mine that disables the highlighting in the HRV.

== Spawn camping ==
Spawn camping involves camping or guarding the position of the enemy team's own spawn on the map. Although usually not expressly against the rules, spawn camping is frequently considered contrary to good sportsmanship and some servers will unofficially enforce a "no-spawn-camping" rule. Exceptions may include pursuing a player who is carrying a critical objective into their own spawn for support, as may occur during Capture the Flag games. In some cases, however, being spawn camped is avoidable, and players simply have to adapt their strategy to defeat the spawn campers or prevent such a situation from occurring in the first place, for instance by guarding their spawn area or room more carefully against opponents.

Some games have spawn protection systems, giving newly spawned players invulnerability, or respawning them in a "safe area" close to the spawn. Another mechanism employed in games is 'point spawning', in which a player is spawned near a teammate and not at a specific fixed location.

Some objective-based games use fixed spawns defended by, for example, automated turrets or "god-mode NPCs" to help counter spawn camping. Sometimes players camp at spawn points just to kill the players who run by there, which is termed 'spawnkilling' and is particularly performed against new and inexperienced players. Players who do this are likely to be targeted by the players they killed.

=== Spawn trapping ===
Spawn trapping is the act of camping in an advantageous position in the vicinity of an enemy's spawn and killing them as soon as they leave the spawn, or their spawn protection runs out. Base trapping can also be used to describe this act.

== Base camping ==
The term base camping refers to camping at the spawning area or starting area of one's own team in Capture the Flag, Team Deathmatch and other types of games: a form of defensive "turtling". This type of camping involves the player (or players) waiting outside their own team's base for members of the opposing team to come to them, rather than actively searching for enemies. Though hiding in or defending key areas of the map, especially if done by a large group, makes it easier to survive enemy attacks, it is sometimes criticized. The general acceptance of base camping mainly depends on the map, the kind of game played and the rules set by server owners. Games in which one team is to defend its base naturally encourages base camping. In situations where the primary objectives of both teams is to kill enemy players, base camping is less well accepted. Sometimes, base camping is also referred to as spawn camping, but the latter term usually implies camping at the opponent's spawn points.

One situation in last man standing types of games where camping is often used is when one team has a single player remaining while the other team has two or more players still alive. The single player will often camp for periods of play in a location that is easy to defend or has only one entryway as this improves their survivability when faced with superior opposition numbers. The other team will usually go into active hunting mode, expecting the single player to be hiding somewhere on the map. This type of camping is more accepted by gamers, as there is a valid reason for the outnumbered player to camp. By convention, when both teams are down to single players only, continued camping is frowned upon and both players are expected to come out and confront each other. To encourage this, some games, such as Battlefield, allow dead players to see the positions of remaining players on the map as well as allow dead players to speak. Thus when a team is down to a single player and the single player camps, team members may announce their location to the opposing team.

Battle royale games discourage camping, at least in the sense that players typically cannot stay in one area for the entirety of a session. Such games utilize a dangerous, doughnut-shaped, area-wide shadow that covers the map, with a shrinking hole that defines the safe play area to force players to move and engage other opponents. Players who do not move to a safer area when the safe zone shrinks will be exposed to the hazard and suffer. A player may choose to camp multiple times (which is encouraged), changing locations every time the safe zone shrinks, to try and outlast the other players as they eliminate each other, but ultimately have to engage in combat with the final, remaining opponents to emerge victorious in the endgame.

=== Miscellaneous ===
First-person shooters may experience other forms of camping, such as 'vehicle camping', 'armor camping', or 'weapon camping'. In many such games, the rarity of particularly valuable equipment (such as tanks, aircraft, or especially powerful guns) is enforced by the game engine imposing a time delay between the time which such an item is taken or used, and the time at which it reappears (or 'respawns') for other players to use. If a player wishes to acquire the vehicle or item in question, they may wait in areas where such an item is due to spawn in order to guarantee that they, rather than some other players, are the ones who get to make use of it. This causes a problem because, while they are waiting, they are not participating in the rest of the game, thus making it harder for other players to find conflicts, or in team-based games – such as Battlefield – disadvantaging their team. It can also cause conflicts between players on the same team. For example, if two players are waiting for a vehicle to spawn, one will miss out on at least the main driving seat, and may decide to team-kill the player who took it, or destroy the vehicle to prevent the other player from using it. This is considered to be a form of griefing.

On the other hand, a player may simply choose to camp in a vehicle, taking advantage of the vehicle's armor or its weapons, which are generally better than the player's. In many cases the vehicle has a large amount of – or even infinite – ammunition, allowing the camper to avoid expending their own ammunition when engaging the enemy team.

=== Countermeasures ===
Camping can give players a tactical advantage against other players who have not yet encountered them, but by consistently remaining in one area, other players they have killed previously may return after respawning with the knowledge of where the camping player is, or inform their teammates via text or voice communication. Opponents may attempt to counter the camping player's strategy by either approaching from a different angle which no longer gives the camper a tactical advantage, or through the use of more indirect weaponry such as grenades which can be used without being directly in view of the camping player.

This type of gameplay is sometimes seen as one of the core components of Attack/Defend matches as both teams seek to set up or destroy prepared defensive positions, but these maps are usually under a time or "casualty" limit to passively encourage or discourage camping behaviors; designers must take great care in designing maps to prevent the creation of essentially unassailable camping spots.

== Online role-playing games ==
In massively multiplayer online role-playing games and MUDs, camping is commonly the practice where the camper stays in a location near where non-player characters, monsters or desirable items spawn. In some games, these positions are easy to spot and once a player or group of players is capable of establishing their camp, they can gain more rewards with less risk to their player characters. This variant of camping poses no risk to other players, unlike in first-person shooters. There is no official rule granting players exclusive rights to a camp.

The MMORPG EverQuest, when first released, required significant time investment to advance in level for most players, requiring many hours of killing NPCs. Players soon realized that camping in one spot and having a single player (referred to as a "puller") leave the group to "pull" a mob back to the group – which would then be attacked by the rest of the group – was the most efficient way to gain experience. The prevalence of camping in EverQuest became significant enough for some of the game's playerbase and critics to jokingly refer to the game as "EverCamp".

In EVE Online, the structure of the space in which gameplay occurs (star systems connected to each other through "stargates") naturally leads to these gates becoming a focus for PvP combat. The practice of waiting near a gate for other pilots to jump into a system is called "gate camping" and is allowed by the developers, except in cases where it is targeted specifically at new players.

== See also ==
- Gaming etiquette
- Glossary of video game terms
- Diary of a Camper
