= Metagaming (book) =

2017 book by Stephanie Boluk and Patrick LeMieux

Metagaming: Playing, Competing, Spectating, Cheating, Trading, Making, and Breaking Videogames is a 2017 book by Stephanie Boluk and Patrick LeMieux.

== Description and organization ==
Written by Stephanie Boluk and Patrick LeMieux in 2017 and published by University of Minnesota Press, the work is presented in both digital and paper formats. It looks at videogames and how they function. Game software is included inside the printed book. The digital version allows viewers to annotate and explore the work as well as play the games. As viewers can start conversations and take notes that can be shared with thousands of other readers, this can be considered an open-access work. The work is in fact both a book and a series of games that can be downloaded and played to demonstrate the theories presented.

The work examines how people interact with videogames as an experience between "playing videogames and their nonhuman operators". Kath Bassett describes this scope as stretching before, during, between, and after playing. The book's six chapters cover various aspects of metagaming. Each chapter contains its own original software that enhances the experience and a specialized topic, resulting in media being built into the work itself.

== Critical assessment ==
In his Rhizomes 2018 review, Trevor Rubin comments that Metagaming examines what games do and how they work within larger possible contexts. Christopher Goetz in a Critical Inquiry Review notes that the work is a "drastic explanation of what it means to engage with video games", providing extensive research, examples, and footnotes. The work explains that games have a range of play and that metagaming is the truest form of play, Melvin Hill reports in his Project Muse review.

The Critical Inquiry Review explains that Boluk and LeMieux show what it is to engage in a video game and refer to the metagame, the game about the game. In his review, Riccardo Fassone focuses on how this work explains the concept of authority within gaming contexts.

== Associated games ==
Boluk and LeMieux have developed several games together as demonstrations for Metagaming:

- Triforce (2018) is a short game to locate pieces of the Triforce ship. CJ Andriessen's review in Destructoid explains that this game applies areas from the Legend of Zelda to different 3D surfaces. Heather Alexandra, in Kotaku reviews notes further that this game "completely changes how space and depth work in The Legend of Zelda"
- Footnotes (2018), which Heather Alexandra considers to be a game based on wandering around to collect footnotes and excerpts from Metagaming. Boluk lectured on this game at Stanford Humanities Center January 14, 2019.
- What Should We Do With Our Games? is a metagaming manifesto created for Manifesto Jam (February 8 -13, 2018)
