= Gamer rage =

Behavior amongst gamers

Gamer rage, also known as raging, is feeling extreme anger or performing violent acts in response to a video game. Abruptly quitting a game due to gamer rage is known as a ragequit or rage quit. A large subset of gamers across all platforms report feeling gamer rage at least once a week. The most common cause for gamer rage is losing a level repeatedly, followed by other players using cheats to win illegitimately. Gamer rage commonly leads players to break their keyboard, mouse or controller, while other items are destroyed more rarely. It is a major cause of in-game toxicity, as well as aggression against family members in real life. Call of Duty was noted as the game franchise that inspired the most rage, followed closely by Mario Kart and Minecraft. Gamers who are infamous for getting Gamer rage include the gamer 'Calamitii' (also known as Matt), who famously is endorsement rating 1 on Overwatch due to his toxicity. The behavior has also extended outside of video games themselves, to online harassment against video game developers due to video game glitches, faulty patches, or simply their public statements, something that was described by Ken Levine as detrimental to the industry, and that has caused developers such as Phil Fish to leave it entirely. The attacks may also be targeted at women in gaming, either in-game or online, due to a misleading belief that they are not "real" gamers resulting from a vicious cycle in which women purposely do not reveal themselves in games for fear of being harassed, or feminists who are attempting to influence gaming, as seen in the Gamergate harassment campaign.

== Causes ==
While most gamer rage was attributed in a poll by Time2Play to losing repeatedly, other players using cheats, and video game glitches, an examination by Valve Corporation of ragequits in DOTA 2 discovered that most were motivated not by repeated losses, but by toxic in-game behavior from other players. Other forms of gamer rage may be motivated by perceived shunning of "geeks" by the mainstream, causing gamers to lash out at those they see as outside the group. In children, a noisy gaming environment and troubles in daily life contributed to incidences of gamer rage.

== Response ==
Numerous multiplayer games have implemented "anti-ragequit" features to penalize players for leaving a game early, though this can be due to wanting to preserve one's kill-death ratio as much as it is due to rage. However, these features have also been noted to penalize players whose connections simply dropped. Monster Hunter Wilds is one of the few single-player games that instituted protection against ragequitting in the form of Alt+F4 prevention on PC.

== See also ==
- Griefer
- Toxic masculinity
