= Instrumental play =

Form of play that is goal-oriented

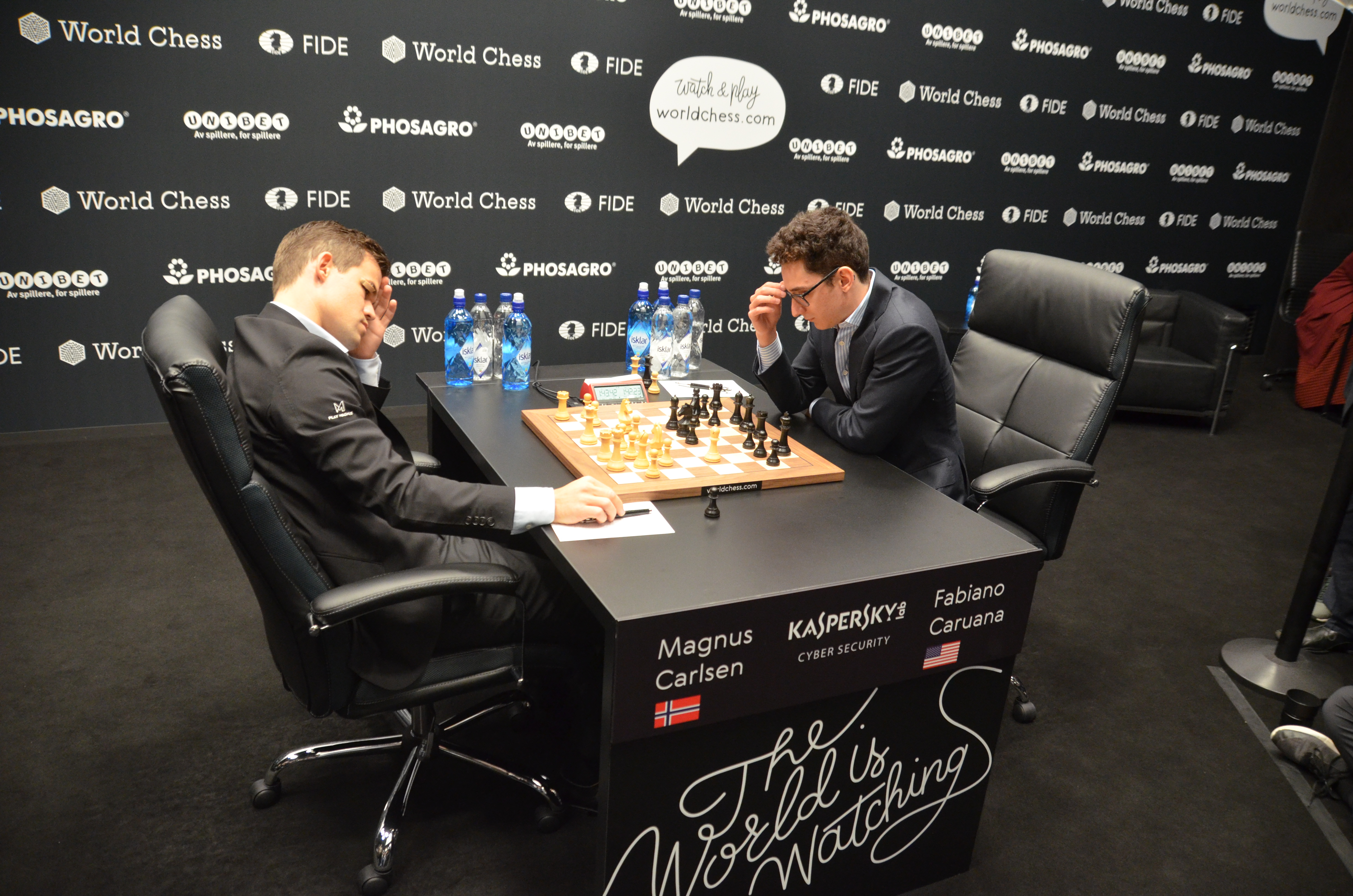
Magnus Carlsen (left) and Fabiano Caruana at the World Chess Championship 2018. Chess tends towards instrumental play.

In game studies, instrumental play (Note: also known as power gaming, metagaming, rationalized play or ludus) is a form of play that seeks to be as good at a game as possible. The behaviors that compose instrumental play are different from what one would typically consider to be 'play' – it is highly focused, goal-oriented, and dedicated.

Playing a multiplayer game comes with various social expectations. The rules of a game and the roles players take are socially-defined, and they are allowed to function only by the players collectively acknowledging their validity, and acting how they are expected. Power gamers form communities of practice which agree on the 'correct' way to play a particular game – both the broad objectives which determine whether a player has achieved success, and the details as to the best way to achieve these objectives. Their strategies are formed through thorough analysis of the game's mechanics, and refined through collective sharing and criticism of their body of knowledge.

== Background ==
While play is often characterized by a lack of seriousness, it is not defined by it. It is easy to come up with a counterexample to this: a chess player is unambiguously engaging in play, but is completely serious while doing it. Instrumental play was described by gaming theorist Roger Caillois in his 1961 book Man, Play and Games, where he presented play as a spectrum between paidia and ludus. Paidia is free play and ludus is instrumental play.

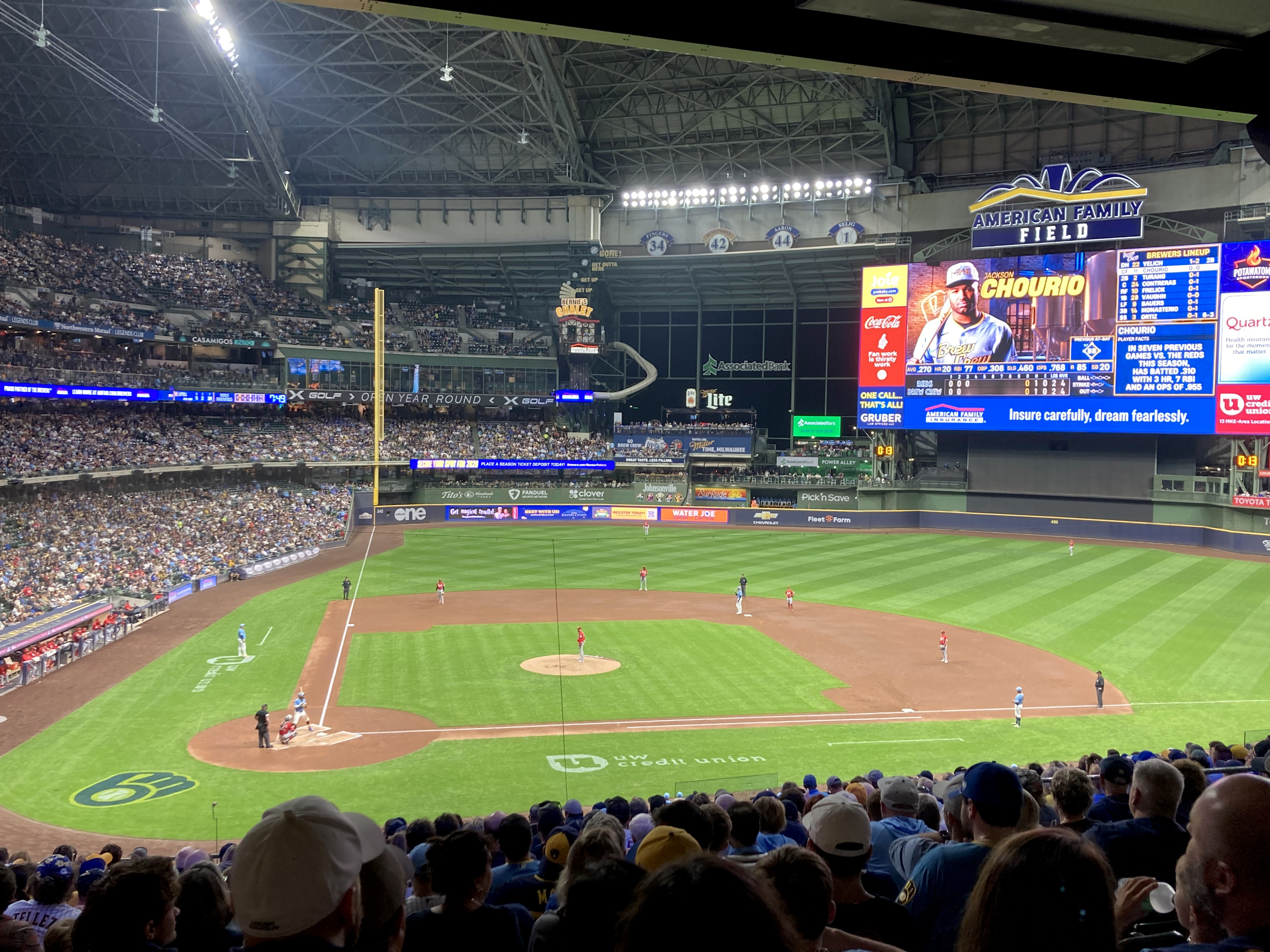
The Cincinnati Reds and the Milwaukee Brewers playing baseball on September 9, 2025. Each player has a role they are expected to fulfill.

The act of play creates invisible social boundaries. If the player were to cross these boundaries, failing to acknowledge the validity of the rules, the play loses all meaning. (Note: Doing so is an act distinct from mere cheating; a cheater attempts to subvert the rules, but does so in a way that still acknowledges their existence.) Players take roles, which define what they must do and how they interact with each other. Each player must be aware of how they expect others to act in their roles, and their own actions are based on those assumptions. It follows that each player's actions are controlled by what the other players assume their actions will be.

In their 2017 book Metagaming, gaming theorists Stephanie Boluk and Patrick LeMieux argue that video games are not games because they do not have rules; rather, they have mechanics which are defined by reality rather than social context. They instead see the mechanics of video games as the base from which metagames – games based on an interpretation of a video game – form.

== Theory ==
Instrumental play is dissimilar to the forms of play typically associated with fun or leisure. Its main focus is on efficiency, skill, and understanding the game to find the best way possible of playing it. As opposed to instrumental play, free play is play that stays in motion, without a predefined end. No play can be purely free or instrumental; purely instrumental play is no longer play and simply becomes a task, and purely free play inevitably moves towards instrumental play. Games make use of both, flowing from one to the other. Power gamers enjoy developing strategies to play the game as 'correctly' as possible, both by considering how they could be playing differently, and how they are currently playing incorrectly. They are willing to put in large amounts of time and effort doing things they may not particularly enjoy in the moment, and break down the game to analyze it and the strategies that can be used to 'attack' it, seeing the game as a problem to be solved.

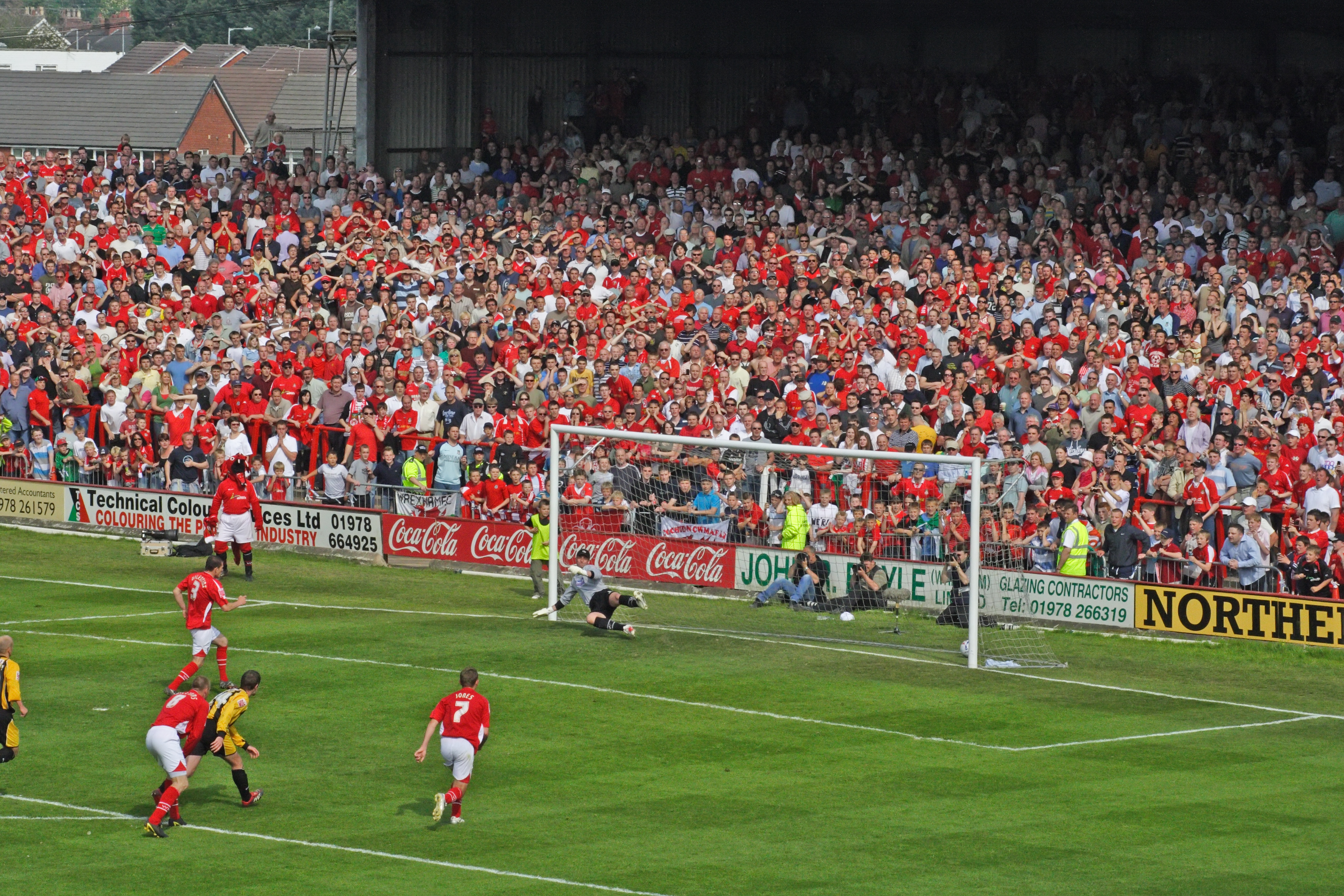
Ryan Valentine of Wrexham scores against Boston United on May 5, 2007. Sports such as association football grew from simple premises to high-stakes events with large audiences.

Games, even ones that originated as "solitary pastimes", naturally evolve into competition. Any game would eventually lose its appeal if there was no one to compete against and no one to watch, as players have an innate desire to defeat opponents – either directly, or indirectly by setting records or otherwise achieving impressive feats. To facilitate this, they form communities where they can compare their skill, establish rules for organized competition, and create spectacle.

When players develop new strategies for a game, other players adopt them, until the strategy becomes a norm. Power gamers mathematically and statistically analyze of the mechanics of a game to understand it and develop new strategies for it, an act called theorycraft. The strategies formed by theorycraft fundamentally change how the game is played, distilling a large variety of options into the few that are objectively correct. The use of numbers to describe games makes the conclusions feel 'objectively true', polarizing the perceived qualities of the strategies the numbers do or do not support into being 'correct' or 'incorrect'.

Players expect these correct strategies of each other They form communities of practice, which are a group of people that collectively engage in a shared behavior. In order to achieve success at a game themselves, a new player must adopt the culture of this community, which involves adopting their practices, forming social connections to join the 'in-group'. The players that are the best at the game garner respect and reputation from others.

=== Paratexts, collective knowledge, and success ===
It is not always clear what exactly it means to be the best at a video game, as they are ever-changing. Communities of practice define the goals they want to achieve. Video games usually have a body of work other than the game itself that seek to influence how one interprets the game, such as reviews and trailers. Communications professor Mia Consalvo calls these works paratexts. Paratexts that teach their reader how best to play a game instrumentally implicitly promote it as the correct mode of play – the explicitly-given information itself cannot be decoupled from the cultural context from which it was written.

When the ideas created by theorycraft are applied into advice on particular actions, measurement tools, or other instantiations, the flexibility of the idea decreases, pushing practice towards standardization. When actions are prescribed upon, or measurement tools used to evaluate others, they assert the objectivity and meaningfulness of the strategy, further reinforcing theorycrafting as the correct mode of play.

The players that disseminate strategies are rewarded with social recognition for their work. Power gamers build hubs of collective intelligence in order to work to their common goal of improving at the game, such as internet forums and wikis. They build institutions that accrue and use reputation to provide credibility to their arguments.

=== Rationalization ===
Instrumental play can be characterized as a form of instrumental rationality, which is in turn a form of social action that exclusively aims to achieve a goal through any means. Sociologist Max Weber, the creator of these concepts, also wrote extensively about the rationalization – the "increasing importance of a style of reasoning" – of society. This movement can cause the original purpose of societal structures to become distorted, as "meaningfulness devolves into practical advance".

The influence of instrumental play extends beyond individual games, spreading throughout society.

== Perception ==
Power gamers are commonly seen as 'too dedicated', 'having no social life outside the game', 'taking the game too seriously', or similar. Cultural theorist Kristine Ask contends that power gamers tend to be important figures within the communities for the games they play, and that there is no single valid way to play a game. Sociologist T.L. Taylor observed that "they consider their own play style quite reasonable, rational, and pleasurable". In a later publication, Taylor noted that instrumental play was frequently forced upon players by social norms in massively multiplayer online game (MMOG) World of Warcraft, a practice she hadn't observed in her prior study of EverQuest, another MMOG. She therefore began to question her previous assessment of instrumental play as quoted, as 'average' players were being coerced into rather involved practices.

Much of the study of instrumental play is based on ethnography – the study of a culture from the perspective of a participant – of a very small number of MMOGs. Taylor criticized this body of work for building an "implied generalized theory of online games", as ethnographical studies have limited ability to say things outside of the limited context they are based in. She called for the broadening of case studies of online games before proper conclusions can be drawn about them at large.
