= Minecraft Manhunt =

Minecraft speedrunning web series

- Thumbnail for "Minecraft Speedrunner VS 5 Hunters REMATCH" (2021) on YouTube
- Genre: Challenge run; Speedrun; Survival
- Created by: Dream
- Starring: Dream; GeorgeNotFound; Sapnap; BadBoyHalo; Antfrost; Awesamdude; CaptainPuffy
- Country of origin: United States
- Original language: English
- No. of episodes: 50

Production
- Running time: 8–69 minutes

Original release
- Network: YouTube
- Release: December 26, 2019 – present

Minecraft Manhunt is a web series created by the American YouTuber Dream and released on YouTube. The series was first published on December 26, 2019, and involves asymmetrical multiplayer gameplay within the sandbox video game Minecraft. In each episode, a speedrunning player, known as the "runner," attempts to complete the game by defeating its final boss—the Ender Dragon—without dying. Opposing the runner is a team of players, the "hunters", who are granted infinite respawns and a compass tracking the runner's location, tasked with killing the runner before the Ender Dragon is defeated.

Over time, Dream increased the format's difficulty by expanding the opposing team from a single hunter to a maximum of six, alongside introducing numerous spin-off variants with modified gameplay mechanics. Manhunt has faced staging allegations linked to controversy surrounding a separate speedrunning cheating incident. Dream responded to the allegations by releasing unedited gameplay sessions, and later, behind-the-scenes footage detailing the series' production.

The series experienced a surge in popularity throughout mid-to-late 2020, accumulating tens of millions of views per episode and earning a Guinness World Record for the most-viewed Minecraft gameplay video on YouTube. Video game journalists praised Manhunt for its high-tension gameplay and Dream's in-game skill, and the series' success established him as a primary figure in the Minecraft community and YouTube gaming.

== Format ==
Dream (the player) engages in combat with two hunters, GeorgeNotFound and Sapnap, in the game's Nether dimension.

Minecraft Manhunt centers around asymmetrical multiplayer gameplay in which a player (the "runner") must win by defeating the Ender Dragon in a single life, while a team of "hunters" attempts to kill them first. The hunters receive infinite respawns and a compass that tracks the runner in real time. To maintain gameplay balance and incentivize improvisation, strategies deemed overpowered are prohibited after initial use.

=== Variations ===
While the series began with Dream facing only a single hunter, Manhunt's difficulty was gradually increased by adding more opposing players, up to a team of six hunters. Beyond scaling the player count, Dream occasionally introduced spin-off formats that modified gameplay mechanics. These variations include "Assassin", where the hunter can kill the runner in a single hit but becomes frozen when directly observed; "Hitmen", in which the runner must survive for a predetermined amount of time in a set area; and "Speedrunner Swap", where control of the runner's character alternates between two players every minute.

== Production ==
=== Development ===
Dream conceptualized Minecraft Manhunt after watching YouTuber Wilbur Soot's "Minecraft, but..." challenge videos, modifying the premise by introducing a definitive win condition: beating the game. Although Soot had previously published a video titled "Minecraft Manhunt"—which featured a similar hunter-oriented format—four months prior to the premiere of Dream's series, Dream stated the video did not serve as an inspiration.

The published episodes rarely represent the first attempt. Because sessions can end prematurely if the runner is killed early on or makes a fatal mistake, the group records multiple matches until a feature-length run is achieved. Dream provides the hunters with a financial incentive to maintain an aggressive playstyle by offering cash bounties for early kills. Each complete, unedited gameplay session typically lasts three to five hours before being condensed for a published video.

Dream tailored the production of the series to capitalize on the YouTube algorithm, particularly in video description keywords and thumbnail creation. He also employed audio editing techniques to splice reactions from scrapped recording sessions into the final published videos.

=== Staging allegations ===
In late 2020, Dream became the subject of a highly publicized speedrunning cheating incident after Speedrun.com moderators independently determined he had used unauthorized modifications to alter item drop rates during his Minecraft speedruns. In February 2021, following this increased scrutiny, Dream addressed new allegations that his Manhunt series had been faked or scripted, broadcasting a live response on Twitch to a peak audience of approximately 250,000 viewers.

In January 2026, Dream released a production breakdown video detailing Manhunt's behind-the-scenes process, including scouting for favorable in-game terrain generation and establishing gameplay rules designed to promote active combat while reducing passive trapping. In the video, he stated that these design decisions were intended to maximize tension rather than to stage specific outcomes.

== Episodes ==
Since the series' debut in December 2019, 50 episodes of Minecraft Manhunt have been published. Episodes featuring spin-off formats or modified mechanics are indicated with explanatory footnotes.

Episodes of Minecraft Manhunt
| Title | Upload date | Runner(s) | Hunter(s) | Winner |
|---|---|---|---|---|
| "Minecraft Speedrunner VS Hunter (FIRST EVER)" | December 26, 2019 | Dream | GeorgeNotFound | Hunters |
| "Minecraft Speedrunner VS Hunter (SECOND EVER)" | December 31, 2019 | Dream | GeorgeNotFound | Runners |
| "Minecraft Speedrunner VS Assassin" (Note: In "Assassin" videos, the hunter is granted a one-hit kill but is frozen in place whenever the runner looks directly at them.) | January 3, 2020 | Dream | GeorgeNotFound | Hunters |
| "Minecraft Hunter VS Minecraft Speedrunner" | January 7, 2020 | GeorgeNotFound | Dream | Hunters |
| "Minecraft Speedrunner VS Slayer" | January 15, 2020 | Dream | BadBoyHalo | Hunters |
| "Minecraft Speedrunner VS Assassin ft. Notch" (Note: The runner must protect guest player Notch, and the hunter wins immediately if Notch is killed.) | January 21, 2020 | GeorgeNotFound, Notch | Dream | Hunters |
| "Minecraft Speedrunner VS Assassin (Again)" | January 28, 2020 | Dream | GeorgeNotFound | Hunters |
| "Minecraft Speedrunner VS Full Diamond Juggernaut" (Note: The hunter begins the match with full diamond armor and a diamond sword, both enchanted.) | February 24, 2020 | Dream | Sapnap | Hunters |
| "Minecraft Speedrunner VS Hunter (Again)" | March 21, 2020 | Dream | GeorgeNotFound | Runners |
| "Minecraft Speedrunner VS 2 Hunters" | April 19, 2020 | Dream | GeorgeNotFound, Sapnap | Runners |
| "Minecraft Speedrunner VS Hunter LIVE" (Note: This episode was originally broadcast live on Twitch before being published to YouTube.) | April 30, 2020 | Dream | GeorgeNotFound | Hunters |
| "Minecraft Speedrunner VS 3 Hunters" | May 14, 2020 | Dream | GeorgeNotFound, Sapnap, BadBoyHalo | Hunters |
| "3 Minecraft Speedrunners VS Hunter ft. MrBeast" (Note: The three runners are only granted one life each, and the team loses if all three are killed.) | May 24, 2020 | MrBeast, Chandler Hallow, Karl Jacobs | Dream | Hunters |
| "Minecraft Speedrunner VS 3 Hunters REMATCH" | May 29, 2020 | Dream | GeorgeNotFound, Sapnap, BadBoyHalo | Runners |
| "Minecraft Speedrunner VS 3 Hunters FINALE" | June 19, 2020 | Dream | GeorgeNotFound, Sapnap, BadBoyHalo | Hunters |
| "Minecraft Speedrunner VS PRO" | June 23, 2020 | Dream | IlluminaHD | Hunters |
| "Minecraft Speedrunner VS 3 Hunters FINALE REMATCH" | July 20, 2020 | Dream | GeorgeNotFound, Sapnap, BadBoyHalo | Runners |
| "Minecraft Speedrunner VS 3 Hunters GRAND FINALE" | August 7, 2020 | Dream | GeorgeNotFound, Sapnap, BadBoyHalo | Runners |
| "Minecraft Speedrunner VS 4 Hunters" | September 5, 2020 | Dream | GeorgeNotFound, Sapnap, BadBoyHalo, Antfrost | Hunters |
| "Minecraft Speedrunner VS 4 Hunters REMATCH" | October 20, 2020 | Dream | GeorgeNotFound, Sapnap, BadBoyHalo, Antfrost | Runners |
| "Minecraft Survivalist VS 3 Hitmen" (Note: In "Hitmen" videos, the playable in-game area is restricted to a 500-by-500 block radius. The hunters are given a time limit to kill the runner in order to win $10,000.) | November 18, 2020 | Dream | GeorgeNotFound, Sapnap, BadBoyHalo | Runners |
| "Minecraft Speedrunner VS 4 Hunters FINALE" | November 26, 2020 | Dream | GeorgeNotFound, Sapnap, BadBoyHalo, Antfrost | Runners |
| "Minecraft Speedrunner VS 4 Hunters FINALE REMATCH" | December 25, 2020 | Dream | GeorgeNotFound, Sapnap, BadBoyHalo, Antfrost | Hunters |
| "Minecraft Speedrunner VS 4 Hunters GRAND FINALE" | February 5, 2021 | Dream | GeorgeNotFound, Sapnap, BadBoyHalo, Antfrost | Runners |
| "Minecraft Survivor VS 3 Hitmen" | March 11, 2021 | Dream | GeorgeNotFound, Sapnap, BadBoyHalo | Runners |
| "Minecraft Speedrunner VS 5 Hunters" | April 23, 2021 | Dream | GeorgeNotFound, Sapnap, BadBoyHalo, Antfrost, Awesamdude | Hunters |
| "Minecraft Speedrunner VS 5 Hunters REMATCH" | July 8, 2021 | Dream | GeorgeNotFound, Sapnap, BadBoyHalo, Antfrost, Awesamdude | Runners |
| "Minecraft Speedrunner VS 2 Assassins" | July 27, 2021 | Dream | GeorgeNotFound, Sapnap | Hunters |
| "Minecraft Speedrunner VS 5 Hunters FINALE" | September 20, 2021 | Dream | GeorgeNotFound, Sapnap, BadBoyHalo, Antfrost, Awesamdude | Runners |
| "Minecraft Speedrunner VS 5 Hunters FINALE REMATCH" | December 1, 2021 | Dream | GeorgeNotFound, Sapnap, BadBoyHalo, Antfrost, Awesamdude | Hunters |
| "Minecraft Speedrunner VS 5 Hunters GRAND FINALE." | February 26, 2022 | Dream | GeorgeNotFound, Sapnap, BadBoyHalo, Antfrost, Awesamdude | Runners |
| "Minecraft Speedrunner VS $1,000,000 MrBeast Challenge" (Note: The runner's prize pool of $1,000,000 decreases continuously over time. If the runner fails to beat the game before the pool reaches zero, the runner must pay the hunters the negative balance.) | July 30, 2022 | Dream | MrBeast, GeorgeNotFound, Sapnap, BadBoyHalo | Runners |
| "Minecraft Hostage Simulator" (Note: Two competing teams are tasked with successfully escorting an invincible, non-competing character to the end of the game.) | March 25, 2023 | Dream | GeorgeNotFound, Sapnap | Hunters |
| "MISSION: PROTECT THE CHICKEN" (Note: The runner is required to escort a chicken to the end of the game, while the hunter attempts to kill the chicken rather than the runner.) | October 31, 2023 | Dream | GeorgeNotFound | Hunters |
| "Minecraft Speedrunner VS TITAN" (Note: In "Titan" videos, the Titan is an opposing—and anonymous—player using a full-body virtual reality setup to physically interact with the game environment.) | September 10, 2024 | Dream | Titan | Hunters |
| "2 Minecraft Speedrunners VS TITAN" | October 24, 2024 | Dream, GeorgeNotFound | Titan | Hunters |
| "3 Minecraft Speedrunners VS TITAN" | March 23, 2025 | Dream, GeorgeNotFound, Sapnap | Titan | Hunters |
| "Minecraft Speedrunner VS 0 Hunters" (Note: Published as an April Fools' Day joke, the video was edited to completely remove the hunters' in-game models and voice audio. The unedited footage was simultaneously released on Dream's secondary channel.) | April 1, 2025 | Dream | GeorgeNotFound, Sapnap, Awesamdude | Hunters |
| "3 Minecraft Speedrunners VS Herobrine" (Note: The opposing "Herobrine" character is controlled by an artificial intelligence mod with automatic pathfinding and enhanced abilities.) | June 1, 2025 | Dream, GeorgeNotFound, Sapnap | Herobrine | Hunters |
| "Minecraft Speedrunner VS $100,000 Bounty Hunter" | June 18, 2025 | Dream | Daquavis | Runners |
| "Minecraft Speedrunner Swap VS 2 Hunters" (Note: In "Speedrunner Swap" videos, control of the runner's character alternates between two players every minute.) | August 17, 2025 | Dream, Daquavis | GeorgeNotFound, Sapnap | Runners |
| "Minecraft Speedrunner Swap VS 2 Hunters" | October 3, 2025 | Dream, Baablu | BadBoyHalo, Fantst | Runners |
| "Minecraft Speedrunner Swap VS 2 Hunters" | October 19, 2025 | Dream, DrDonut | Daquavis, Skeppy | Hunters |
| "Minecraft Speedrunner VS Hunter REVIVAL" (Note: In "Revival" videos, the number of hunters increases sequentially per episode, up to a maximum of six.) (Note: Against one hunter, the runner is prohibited from equipping armor.) | December 15, 2025 | Dream | GeorgeNotFound | Runners |
| "Minecraft Speedrunner VS 2 Hunters REVIVAL" | December 21, 2025 | Dream | GeorgeNotFound, Sapnap | Runners |
| "Minecraft Speedrunner VS 3 Hunters REVIVAL" | December 24, 2025 | Dream | GeorgeNotFound, Sapnap, BadBoyHalo | Runners |
| "Minecraft Speedrunner VS 4 Hunters REVIVAL" (Note: Although the runner failed the initial requirement of winning five consecutive matches, a community poll allowed the format to advance.) | January 10, 2026 | Dream | GeorgeNotFound, Sapnap, BadBoyHalo, Antfrost | Hunters |
| "Minecraft Speedrunner VS 5 Hunters REVIVAL" | January 26, 2026 | Dream | GeorgeNotFound, Sapnap, BadBoyHalo, Antfrost, Awesamdude | Runners |
| "Minecraft Speedrunner VS 6 Hunters" | March 8, 2026 | Dream | GeorgeNotFound, Sapnap, BadBoyHalo, Antfrost, Awesamdude, CaptainPuffy | Runners |
| "Minecraft Speedrunner VS 6 Hunters REMATCH" | March 29, 2026 | Dream | GeorgeNotFound, Sapnap, BadBoyHalo, Antfrost, Awesamdude, CaptainPuffy | Hunters |
| "Minecraft Speedrunner Swap VS 3 Hunters" | August 9, 2026 | Dream, GeorgeNotFound | Daquavis, Skeppy, BadBoyHalo | Hunters |
| "Minecraft Speedrunner VS 6 Hunters FINALE" | October 20, 2026 | Dream | GeorgeNotFound, Sapnap, BadBoyHalo, Antfrost, Awesamdude, CaptainPuffy | Hunters |

== Reception ==
=== Viewership and cultural impact ===
Minecraft Manhunt gained widespread popularity on YouTube, with individual videos accumulating tens of millions of views. In a January 2021 article for PC Gamer, Rachel Watts wrote that the series was "ridiculously popular". Nathan Grayson, writing for Kotaku, stated that the series turned Dream "into a household name among Minecraft fans". Additionally, Zack Zwiezen of Kotaku described Dream as "pretty much the primary face of video games on the platform", attributing the claim to Manhunt's viewership.

The episode "Minecraft Speedrunner VS 3 Hunters GRAND FINALE" earned recognition from Guinness World Records as the most-viewed Minecraft gameplay video on YouTube, having surpassed 113 million views at the time of its certification in July 2022. Similarly, YouTube's official 2020 year-end metrics ranked the episode as the seventh-highest-trending video in the United States, and named Dream their second-highest-trending and top breakout creator. Dream has won consecutive awards in the Gaming category at the 2020 and 2021 Streamy Awards, as well as Content Creator of the Year at The Game Awards in 2021.

=== Critical reception ===
Critics and journalists frequently highlighted the tension and high level of skill involved in the series. Nicolas Perez, writing for The A.V. Club, described the viewing experience as leaving him "slack-jawed every time". Cody Gravelle of Screen Rant said the series was "one of the best multiplayer Minecraft experiences in recent memory", describing the format as "incredibly skill-testing, with the odds stacked against the [runner]". Ashley Bardhan of Kotaku observed that Dream's initial popularity stemmed primarily from his in-game skill, which was showcased most prominently in the Manhunt series.
