= Mask (Dream song) =

2021 single by Dream

Single by Dream
- Released: May 21, 2021
- Recorded: March 2021
- Genre: Acoustic rock; pop rock
- Length: 2:54
- Label: Dream Music
- Songwriters: Dream; BanRisk; Perish Beats; PmBata
- Producers: Perish Beats; BanRisk

Dream singles chronology
"Roadtrip" (2021)	"Mask" (2021)	"Change My Clothes" (2021)

Music video
- "Mask (Official Music Video)" on YouTube (Note: Video now set to private) "Mask" (Official Lyric Video) on YouTube

"Mask" is the second single by American YouTuber Dream. It was released on May 21, 2021, through Dream Music. "Mask" is more rock-influenced than Dream's previous song, "Roadtrip", and lyrically details his past and present struggles with attention deficit hyperactivity disorder (ADHD).

"Mask" performed well commercially, receiving one million streams in its first week and becoming Dream's first top-40 single on the UK Singles Chart, where it reached number 38. The song's accompanying animated music video, released in June 2021, was negatively received by viewers for its quality and messages, and became an internet meme.

== Background and release ==
On March 13, 2021, Dream revealed through his now-deactivated private Twitter account that he was working on a new song. The following day he revealed the name of the song to be "Mask". It was scheduled to be released on April 23, 2021, but was delayed due to the song's music video production falling behind schedule.

On May 15, 2021, he confirmed on his private Twitter account that the song would be released on May 21. It was released to streaming services, and onto the "Dream Music" YouTube channel as a lyric video. Dream also allowed the free use of the song as long as it was not a re-upload.

== Composition and lyrics ==
"Mask" has been described as acoustic rock. The song's melody was inspired by "She's Kinda Hot" by 5 Seconds of Summer. The song was produced by Perish Beats and BanRisk, who had produced his previous single "Roadtrip" in February 2021. The song was produced remotely, with Dream and the producers working together in a Discord call with Perish sharing his screen. The song took a week to produce, outside of a few changes afterwards.

"Mask" was inspired by Dream's personal struggles with ADHD during his childhood. Dream has said that "Mask" is a much more personal song than "Roadtrip": "I would say, the main reason I've been enjoying music is being able to tell stories and talk about things from my life and stuff in a catchy way." The song originally had different lyrics, but was rewritten by Dream; Dream commented on a now deleted Twitter post that he wrote all the lyrics himself. PmBata, who was featured on "Roadtrip", also contributed to the songwriting.

== Commercial performance ==
"Mask" did well commercially. In its first week of release, "Mask" was streamed one million times on Spotify. The song also became Dream's first top forty single in the United Kingdom, where it debuted at number 38 on the UK Singles Chart on May 28, 2021. It also made appearances on the Canadian Hot 100 and the Irish Singles Chart, where it charted at number 96 and 43, respectively. As of March 2023, "Mask" has over 80 million streams on Spotify, and is his second most-streamed song on the platform. The official lyric video for "Mask", released on Dream Music, has over 33.1 million views on YouTube as of December 15, 2022.

== Music video ==
The music video for "Mask" was directed by Phyre Studios, a group of 18 teenage animators, and released on June 8, 2021. In the Pixar-inspired CGI video, Dream is seen walking through his school, talking to his dad, playing games with his friends and throwing away his "normal pills". The video also features cameos of fellow YouTubers GeorgeNotFound and Sapnap. The video was deliberately made in a non-Minecraft style, as Dream thought "it would be cringe" if it was that way. The production of the video lasted from March 16 to June 6, 2021. The animation's production was rushed, with Dream giving the animators vague cues that left them confused. The time constraints meant that models for other characters, such as Dream's dad and other Minecraft YouTubers were scrapped, and many technical errors and mistakes were left in the animation. The music video missed its scheduled deadline of April 23, 2021, due to problems with rendering. Lighting issues subsequently delayed the release of the song as well.

Upon release, the music video received negative reactions from viewers, many of whom commented on the poor quality of the designs and its technical mistakes. The song's reception led to the creation of several remixes and YouTube Poops of the song and its video. Dream came under controversy because of the music video's poor quality, along with accusations that he had underpaid his animators. In response, Dream said on Reddit that while he did rush the animators initially, when the April 23 deadline was missed, he decided to let them take their time and finish it "as soon as [they] can", and that he had paid both Phyre and the animators over three times the amount they had asked for. Phyre Studios has since had mixed opinions on the video's response, with the head animator Phyre stating "It was interesting to see all the hate, I'm not used to it, [but] It is what it is, some people were very harsh or toxic." The animator also stated that they would "work with Dream again". Brady J. Harty, who worked on Dream's character model, felt differently about the backlash. "Seeing the viral attention that tweets got making fun of our work was really disappointing. It was exhausting dealing with the backlash."

The music video was taken down from YouTube in late August 2021 at 15 million views.

=== "Normal Pills" meme ===

From top to bottom; The controversial "Normal Pills" scene and its animation cue card, highlighting the vague scripting/direction Dream gave Phyre Studios during production.

The video for "Mask" contains a scene where Dream throws a bottle of "Normal Pills" into a bin. During the animation of the scene, Dream was vague about the description and meaning of the "Normal Pills" to Phyre Studios. Phyre stated that "it wasn't clear what the normal pill bottle was supposed to represent."

The scene became an internet meme and attracted controversy for its message, which was seen to encourage medical non-compliance. Dream later clarified in an interview with Anthony Padilla that the scene was based on his real experiences, and how he was dismissive of medication for his ADHD. He stated "I don't know enough about them to comment on whether that was smart of me to do. I don't wanna encourage anybody to do that."

== Personnel ==
Credits adapted from Spotify, Tidal and YouTube.

- Dream – vocals, songwriting
- Justin James Kegel (Perish Beats) – producer
- Damian Vinh Hien Hoffmanns (BanRisk) – producer, songwriting
- Parker Makani Bata (PmBata) – songwriting

Artwork

- Camruna – artwork

Music video

- Production – Phyre Studios
- Screenplay – Dream, Xoriak
- 2D artists – Alex Ulrick, DairyPanda, Phyre Productions, SolScribbles, Xoriak
- Layout artists – Phyre Productions, Walking Yat, Xoriak
- Rigging – GeekyAnim, Xoriak
- Animators – Alex Ulrick, CloudX, GeekyAnim, Kyran Talboys, May, Phyre, TME, Tommaso Maurutto, Walking Yat, Xoriak, Xynth
- Modelers – Brady J. Harty, Lukasz, Phyre, SFB_Arts, Xoriak
- VFX artists – Hozq, Phyre, Xoriak
- Lighting artists – Phyre, Vortex, Xoriak
- Post-production – Xoriak

== Charts ==
Chart performance for "Mask"
Chart (2021)	Peak position
Canada (Canadian Hot 100)	96
Hungary (Single Top 40)	37
Ireland (IRMA)	43
UK Singles (Official Charts)	38

== Release history ==
Release history for "Mask"
Region	Date	Format	Ref.
Various	May 21, 2021	Digital download, streaming	
