= Quackity =

Mexican influencer (born 2000)

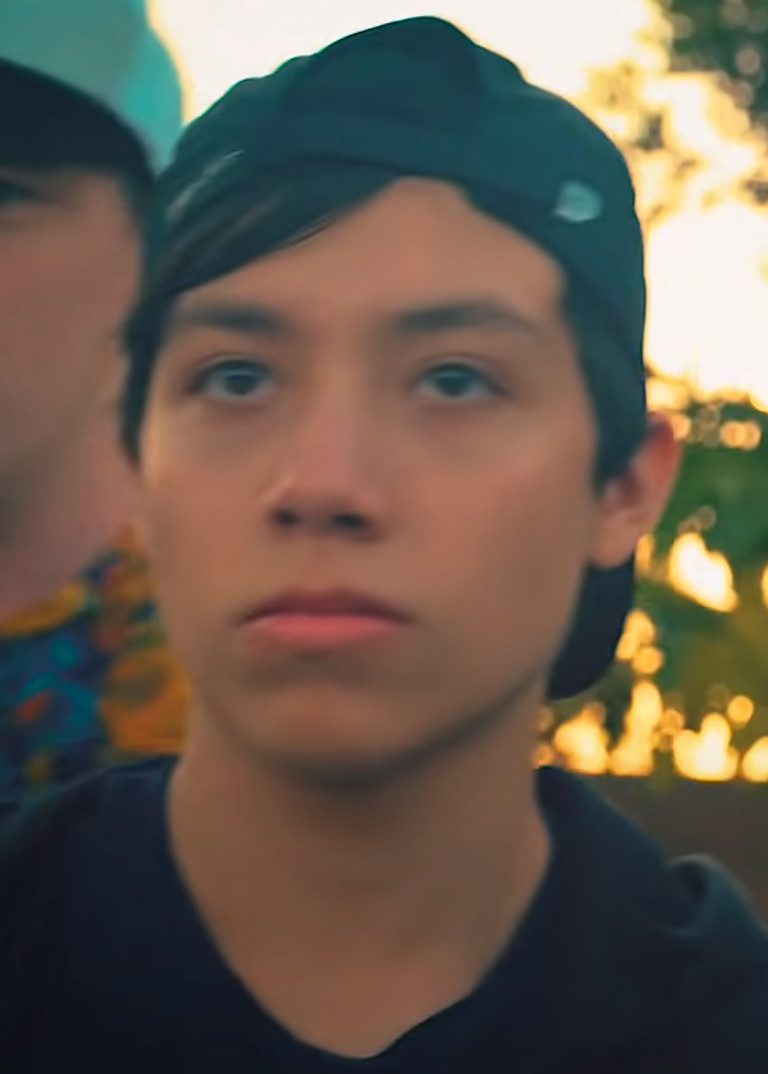
- Alexis in 2019
- Born: 28 December 2000 (age 25); Mexico
- Other names: Alex; Big Q
- Occupations: YouTuber; Twitch streamer

Twitch information
- Channel: Quackity
- Genre: Gaming
- Game: Minecraft
- Followers: 6.6 million

YouTube information
- Channel: Quackity
- Years active: 2013–present
- Genre: Gaming
- Subscribers: 6.18 million
- Views: 525.61 million
- Last updated: 14 June 2026
- Website: quackity.com

Alexis (born 28 December 2000), better known online as Quackity, is a Mexican YouTuber and Twitch streamer who is primarily known for creating Minecraft content. As of December 2025, he had 6 million followers on Twitch, making him the 29th most followed streamer on the platform. He won Best Minecraft Streamer at the 2022 and 2023 Streamer Awards and Best International Streamer at the 2023 Streamer Awards. In 2025, Quackity announced his multilingual tool Dababel, which aims to help users who speak different languages understand each other by talking into the software. In the announcement video, he partnered with Breaking Bad actor Luis Moncada to hear his son speak Spanish to him.

== Career ==
=== 2010–2018: Early online presence ===
Alexis's very first YouTube channel is called DjYeroc123. It was created on 29 October 2010. Alexis posted short stories, gameplays and guides of the video game Club Penguin. The channel was active for over a year and a half until it was discontinued in August 2012.

Alexis began his main YouTube channel in 2013 under the name QuackityHQ, where he first posted short videos of the game Toontown Online. Inside the game, the word Quackity was utilized to censor words that aren't allowed in chat when a character of the duck species is the one typing it. Quackity later became his online username and would later use ducks as the icon of his brand.

Alexis created his Twitch account Quackity, on 4 September 2013. He did not stream frequently until 2019.

=== 2018–2020: YouTube popularity ===
Alexis has gained particular renown on YouTube for his series of videos called Discord Got Talent, a series where he and a few guest judges review people's talents on Discord. The judges have buzzes and can choose to approve or not approve participants in a format that is reminiscent of popular television competition shows, as the name of the series would suggest. Notable guest judges include American YouTubers MrBeast and Dream, English YouTuber KSI, and Canadian Twitch streamer Pokimane.

=== 2020–2022: Streaming, Dream SMP, and Minecraft content ===
In August 2020, Alexis joined the Dream SMP, an invite-only survival multiplayer (SMP) Minecraft server created by fellow YouTubers and content creators BadBoyHalo, Dream, and GeorgeNotFound. He quickly became a key character on the server, which in turn grew his following.

In July 2021, he collaborated and played Minecraft with Breaking Bad actor Dean Norris. In October 2021, he appeared on the Twitch Leaks, which revealed the top Twitch streamers earnings from August 2019 to October 2021. Alexis was ranked 73 on the list, with a reported payout of $1,065,157.18 during this time period.

In December 2021, Alexis participated in The Creator Games 3, an influencer tournament created by MrBeast featuring 15 competitors with a grand prize of $1,000,000.

=== 2022–present: Multilingual content ===
On 9 July 2022, Alexis joined Karmaland, a Spanish-language Minecraft server that has been around since 2014, for its fifth season. Since he joined, Alexis has been regularly streaming on his Spanish Twitch channel, QuackityToo, while playing on the server alongside other massive Spanish creators like Rubius and Willyrex.

On 11 March 2023, Alexis won Best Minecraft Streamer at the 2022 Streamer Awards. Later on 28 February 2023, he participated in Twitch Rivals: Squid Craft Games 2 (later renamed Twitch Rivals: Survival Cup 2 due to copyright), a Squid Game-based Twitch creator game featuring 200 Twitch streamers including AuronPlay, Rubius, Amouranth, and many more. On 22 March 2023, he created the QSMP, which stands for "Quackity's Survival Multiplayer", a multilingual private Minecraft server with live automated translation.

On 17 February 2024, Alexis won Best Minecraft Streamer and Best International Streamer at the 2023 Streamer Awards. He was also nominated for Streamer of the Year at the same ceremony. Later on 13 July 2024, he appeared and participated in a MrBeast video titled "50 YouTubers Fight for $1,000,000".

On 19 March 2025, Alexis collaborated with Jack Black, as part of the promotional campaign for A Minecraft Movie.

== Personal life ==
Alexis was born in Mexico on 28 December 2000. He currently lives in both Mexico and the United States, having residences in both countries.

He studied in college to earn a property law degree.

== Filmography ==
=== Web ===
Year	Show	Role	Notes	Ref.
2021	The Creator Games 3	Himself	YouTube Premium exclusive	

== Awards and nominations ==
Year	Ceremony	Category	Result	Ref.
2022	12th Streamy Awards	Just Chatting	Nominated	
2022	The Streamer Awards	Best Minecraft Streamer	Won	
2023	ESLAND Awards	Streamer of the Year	Nominated	
2023	ESLAND Awards	Roleplayer of the Year	Nominated	
2023	ESLAND Awards	Revelation Streamer	Nominated	
2023	13th Streamy Awards	Just Chatting	Won	
2023	The Game Awards	Content Creator of the Year	Nominated	
2023	Nickelodeon Mexico Kids' Choice Awards	Streamer Más Cool (Coolest Streamer)	Nominated	
2023	2023 MTV MIAW Awards	Streamer Del Año (Streamer of the Year)	Nominated	
2023	The Streamer Awards	Best Minecraft Streamer	Won	
2023	The Streamer Awards	Best International Streamer	Won	
2023	The Streamer Awards	Streamer of the Year	Nominated	
2026	The Streamer Awards	Best Content Group (Note: Shared with the QSMP)	Nominated	
2026	The Streamer Awards	Legacy Award	Won	

== See also ==
- List of most-followed Twitch channels
