= Tom Simmons =

Tom or Thomas Simmons may refer to:

- Tom Simmons, American actor, known for The Truman Show
- Tom Simmons (comedian), American stand-up comedian
- Tom Simmons (footballer) (1929–2013), Australian rules footballer
- Thomas Joseph Simmons (1932–2002), American lawyer and politician
- Thomas J. Simmons (1837–1905), American justice in the state of Georgia

== See also ==
- Thomas Simons (disambiguation)
