= Thomas Simons =

Thomas Simons may refer to:

- Thomas W. Simons Jr. (born 1938), American diplomat and academic
- Thomas Young Simons (1828–1878), American lawyer and politician
- TommyInnit (born Thomas Michael Simons; 2004), English YouTuber and Twitch streamer
- Thomas Michael Simons (born Jack Manifold; 2002), English YouTuber and Twitch streamer
- Henry Thomas Simons (1887–1956), English professional footballer

== See also ==
- Thomas Simmons (disambiguation)
