= Heat Waves (fan fiction) =

Fan fiction about Minecraft YouTubers

- Author: tbhyourelame
- Language: English
- Genre: Real person fiction, romance, LGBTQ+ fiction
- Published: Archive of Our Own
- Publication date: October 2020–January 2021
- Media type: Fan fiction

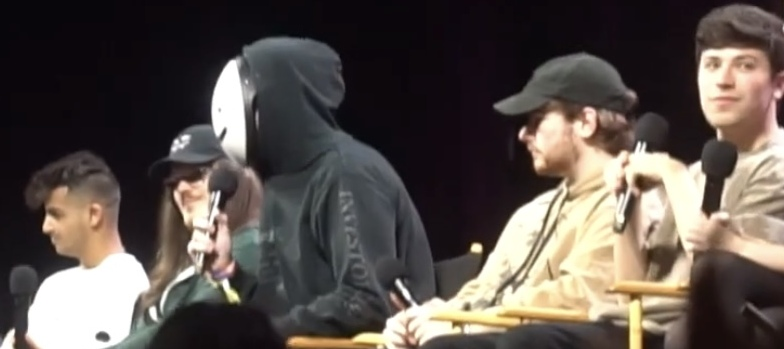
The Dream Team Panel at VidCon 2023, containing the subjects of Heat Waves and other members of the Dream SMP. From left to right: Skeppy, BadBoyHalo, Dream, Sapnap, GeorgeNotFound

Heat Waves is a fan fiction written by Archive of Our Own (AO3) user "tbhyourelame" about an imagined romantic relationship between the Minecraft YouTubers Dream and GeorgeNotFound, known for their Minecraft server the Dream SMP. It takes its title from the song "Heat Waves" by the band Glass Animals, which the fan fiction helped popularise and bring wider attention to. The work quickly gained popularity in the Minecraft YouTuber community and spawned internet memes, tribute videos, and fan art; it also received generally positive reviews for its storytelling, though it was also criticized for being real person fiction. It garnered millions of views and was one of the most liked pieces of work on AO3.

== Plot ==
The American YouTuber Dream is distracted during a livestream with British YouTuber GeorgeNotFound and American YouTuber Sapnap, complaining about the Florida heat before the stream ends. Later, George sends Dream the song "Heat Waves" by Glass Animals. That night, Dream dreams of a lagoon in Florida he visited as a child, where he and a dream-version of George discover moon jellies and share a kiss. He wakes up unsettled and begins thinking about the dream and his feelings toward George.

In the following days, Dream listens to the song repeatedly and begins associating its lyrics with George. During a Minecraft chess stream involving George, Sapnap, and BadBoyHalo, Dream admits he had a dream about George, prompting teasing from viewers. After the stream, George admits that he has also dreamed about Dream. Their conversations become more flirtatious, both in private and on social media. As their exchanges continue, Dream realizes that his feelings for George are romantic. He sends George partial photos of himself and continues engaging in suggestive banter. After driving impulsively to Miami and reflecting on his childhood memories of the beach and his father, Dream confides in Sapnap about his emotions. Encouraged by Sapnap, Dream invites George to come from London to visit him in Florida. George hesitates but eventually agrees, on the condition that Sapnap join them.

During a livestream, Dream, who cannot be heard by George's audience, continues flirting with George. Their private communication grows more explicit, culminating in George abruptly ending a stream after becoming overwhelmed by Dream's remarks. Shortly afterward, online speculation arises about tension between them. George announces a temporary break from streaming, explaining to Dream that he must visit his grandparents' farm, where he will have limited internet access. During George's absence, Dream continues to have recurring dreams about him and begins writing unsent confessions in his phone's notes app. He writes that he thinks about George frequently and is unsure about the state of their relationship. Sapnap reveals that George once admitted to having feelings for Dream when they first became friends but that those feelings passed. The information further destabilizes Dream.

In an impulsive moment, Dream copies his private notes and pastes them into a message to George. When George returns from the farm and messages him, Dream attempts to delete the confession but accidentally sends it. George confronts Dream about the message, which includes statements about his feelings, past frustrations, and his continued affection. Dream explains that he never intended to send it and that he struggled with his feelings. He admits that he distanced himself out of fear and that his emotions resurfaced more intensely during their recent interactions. George reveals that he still cares for Dream but feels overwhelmed by the sudden intensity of the confession. He questions whether they can realistically pursue a relationship given the emotional strain and their physical distance.

Although George states that he is not ready to move beyond friendship, he clarifies that his hesitation is not due to a lack of feelings. The two agree to establish boundaries and reduce one-on-one flirtation while remaining in each other's lives. Dream begins attending therapy and focuses on stabilizing his mental health. Communication between Dream, George, and Sapnap resumes in a calmer tone. After a period of reflection, George confirms that he still intends to visit Florida in six weeks.

== Development and release ==
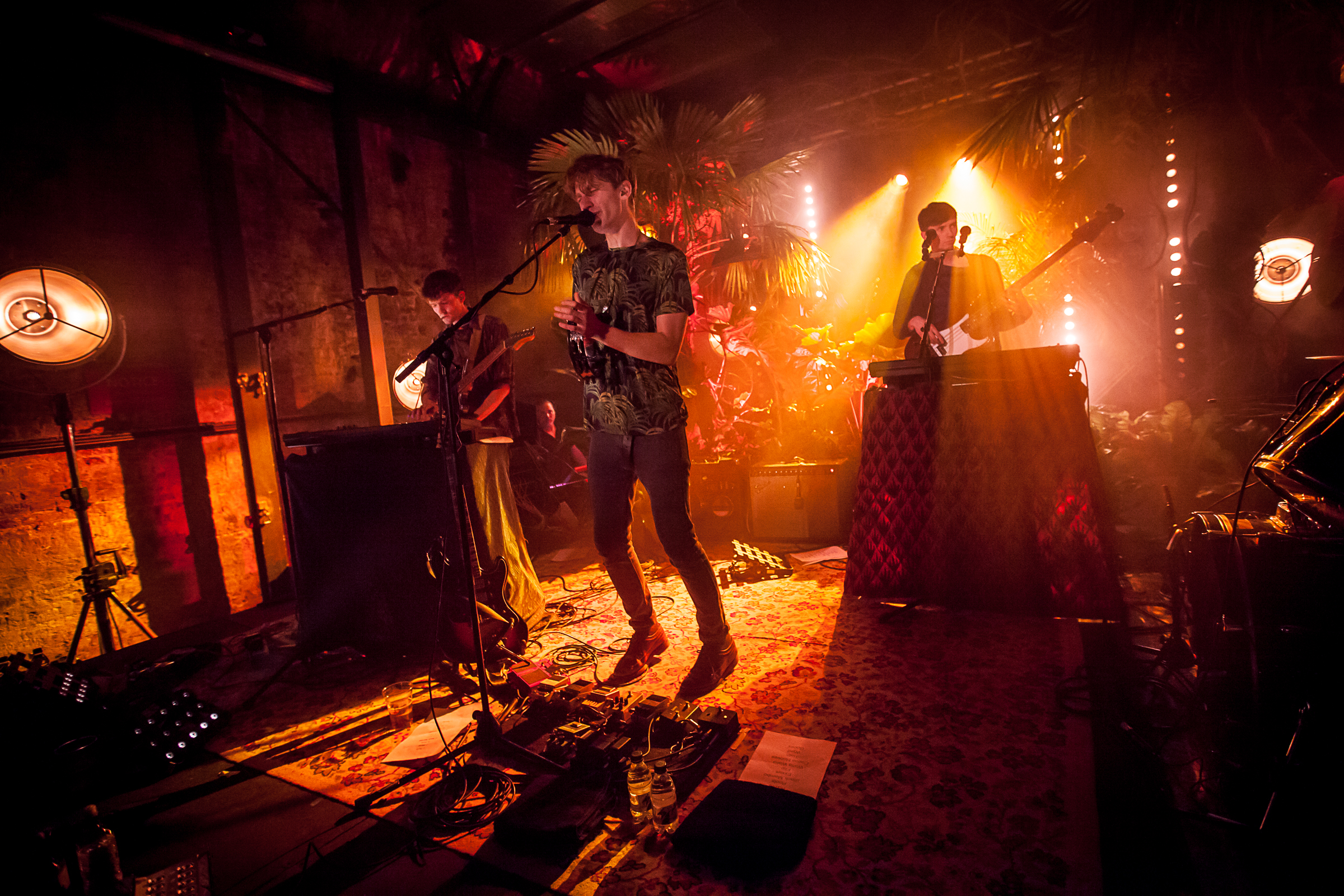
Glass Animals, whose song "Heat Waves" is the namesake of the fan fiction, performing in 2014. Dave Bayley, the founder and frontman of Glass Animals, has publicly acknowledged and read the fan fiction.

Heat Waves is a 12-chapter romantic slash fan fiction that was published between October 2020 and January 2021 by Archive of Our Own user "tbhyourelame". It takes its title from and is inspired by the song "Heat Waves" by the band Glass Animals. It is a real person fiction; the YouTubers who the work is about, Dream and GeorgeNotFound, are frequent collaborators and appeared on the Dream SMP Minecraft server, which they co-founded. The server itself followed a fictional lore.

== Reception ==
The fan fiction became popular in the "Minecraft YouTuber community" (MCYT), a group of fans of Minecraft YouTubers, and amassed views in the millions, eventually surpassing All the Young Dudes, a Harry Potter fan fiction, as the most-viewed work on AO3. The ensuing popularity was so much that the author of the story, tbhyourelame, used a third-party Twitter account to update fans on development. In January 2021, AO3 was shut down temporarily, which was misattributed to the influx of readers to a new chapter of the fan fiction crashing the site's servers. It also became one of the most liked fics on the platform.

Tribute videos, art, and internet memes about the piece of work were made. It was widely praised for its storytelling and characterisation. The popularity influenced how the YouTubers' characters in their Minecraft server, the Dream SMP, were perceived by fans. A quote from the work, "I burn you? You melt me," was frequently used online.

The work also helped boost the song's popularity. Glass Animals' manager Amy Morgan acknowledged it, saying it was an unexpected contribution to the song's success. The lead songwriter and vocalist of the band, Dave Bayley, read it. The fiction brought controversy around the ethics of writing real person fiction, which was considered a niche subgenre until the work's publication. Dream and George have condoned and publicly encouraged writing fiction about them.
