= Minecraft speedrunning =

Completing Minecraft as fast as possible

- A screenshot from Skycrab's 6:39 world record run, featuring a successful zero-cycle strategy against the Ender Dragon boss An editor has nominated the above file for discussion of its purpose and/or potential deletion. You are welcome to participate in the discussion and help reach a consensus.
- Video game: Minecraft
- Release: November 18, 2011
- World record: RSG Any%, 1.16–1.19: 6:39 by Skycrab; SSG Any%, 1.16–1.19: 1:29 by KenanKardes
- Leaderboard: speedrun.com/mc
- Last updated: August 26, 2026

Minecraft speedrunning is a subset of speedrunning that focuses on completing goals in the game Minecraft in the shortest amount of time possible. The most popular category is Any% Glitchless in the version 1.16.1, completed by reaching the End Dimension, defeating the Ender Dragon (the game's final boss), and entering the portal in the End Fountain to roll credits, without the use of glitches. Many online communities have sprouted around speedrunning, and speedrunners have become an important part of Minecraft's online fandom.

Minecraft speedrunning has become popular and mainstream around 2020. Before that, Japanese players had dominated the Minecraft speedrunning sphere, pioneering most strategies and defining the Random Seed Glitchless (or RSG) category. As of August 2026, the current world record for the most popular speedrunning category, 1.16-1.19 RSG, is a time of 6:39.813, set by Norwegian player Skycrab on July 27, 2026.

== Background ==
Minecraft speedrunning features many categories, prominently Random Seed Glitchless (RSG) and Set Seed Glitchless (SSG). RSG speedruns, the most popular category of speedruns, involve the runner generating a new world with a randomly generated seed; the runner's goal is to defeat the Ender Dragon as fast as possible, without using glitches or major bugs. Alternatively, SSG speedruns allow the runner to pick a seed and practice it limitlessly beforehand to optimize and perfect their run; however, they are still not allowed to use glitches and bugs.

In addition, most categories are split up by the version of Minecraft played, with the most popular two being Pre-1.8 and 1.16-1.19. Each of these versions of the game have vastly different strategies for speedrunning as they have different resources and structures available. Pre-1.8 speedruns are typically performed on version 1.7.10, while 1.16-1.19 speedruns are performed primarily on version 1.16.1, as the Ender Pearl rate when bartering with Piglins is higher, including the non-existence of Piglin Brutes, which make raiding bastions harder due to their high damage.

There are many steps to beat Minecraft: one must build and light a portal to the Nether dimension with obsidian, and then obtain Blaze Rods and Ender Pearls to craft Eyes of Ender, which lead players to the Stronghold structure, containing the End Portal. Blaze Rods are obtained from killing Blazes in the Nether Fortress structure, and Ender Pearls can be gathered from killing Endermen or bartering with Piglins using gold. After entering the End dimension, they have to kill the Ender Dragon, opening the fountain portal to the Overworld. A run is marked as complete and the timer ends once the player has entered the fountain portal, initiating the credit sequence.

== Strategy ==
Map of Strongholds and their coordinates—they generate in rings around the origin of the world (0,0).

Players frequently reset seeds to find one optimal enough to perform a run in. Some players use tools that allow multiple seeds to be loaded at once to quickly pick those that have characteristics that they want—usually beaches, villages or ruined portals. Beaches contain buried treasure chests, which have items essential for the early-game, such as iron and food. Runners are able to use the debug menu, accessed via the F3 key, to locate buried treasure chests without the use of the Buried Treasure Map item. Villages and ruined portals are similar in that they provide quick loot, but beaches are usually more ideal for their proximity to the ocean, which means easy access to magma ravines – ravines that have their bottom covered in magma blocks and obsidian. Under many of them are large patches of lava, which can be used to create a Nether Portal.

The most common strategy in the Nether is to locate and travel to a Bastion before a Nether Fortress. The traditional strategy to find a Bastion is using the debug menu and looking for a spike in entities. Bastions are important because trading gold with Piglins allows for the acquisition of many crucial resources such as: Fire Resistance potions, allowing for immunity to ranged Blaze attacks; obsidian, used to build portals to return to the Overworld; Ender Pearls, needed for crafting Eyes of Ender; string, which is used to make wool, which is then turned into beds; glowstone dust and crying obsidian, used to make respawn anchors. Beds and respawn anchors are important because they are used to kill the Ender Dragon in the End dimension through explosions, or are used to "death reset," allowing the player to die and respawn while preserving their progress to refill the health and hunger bars. Ender Pearls are important not only for faster Nether travel, using the item's ability to teleport the player when thrown, but also for crafting Eyes of Ender. The gold used for Piglin bartering is usually found through breaking into the Bastions and mining the gold blocks that spawn in the structure. The player then travels to the Fortress and kills Blazes, obtaining Blaze Rods. They then craft Blaze Rods into Blaze Powder and combine them with Ender Pearls to create Eyes of Ender. To locate the Bastion and Fortress easily, players use the debug screen to identify data spikes known to correlate with certain mob entities and spawners.

Next, the player uses obsidian obtained in the Bastion to return to the Overworld and throw Eyes of Ender, which point to the Stronghold. Players are able to triangulate the estimated coordinates of the Stronghold by finding the difference in the angles in which the eyes go after they are thrown. In November 2021, the decision was made by the Speedrun.com moderators to legalize external tools that measure the angles Eyes of Ender travel while thrown and calculate the exact coordinates of the Stronghold structure. Players then typically travel through the Nether to reach the Stronghold; one block in the Nether is equal to eight blocks in the Overworld, making travel faster. After reaching the triangulated coordinates, the player builds a portal to travel back into the Overworld. After taking the Nether portal through to the Stronghold structure, players must navigate to the End Portal room, where they fill in the portal frames with Eyes of Ender, opening and entering the portal to the End dimension.

Once entering the End, the player must defeat the Ender Dragon boss to complete the speedrun. Many players use a strategy called "one-cycling" where they place several beds on the pillar where the Ender Dragon perches and blow them up when it is near, making use of the feature that beds explode in other dimensions when sleeping is attempted. This deals a massive amount of damage, and the dragon can typically be defeated with fewer than 7 bed explosions, although advanced players can get away with 4–5. Another strategy in the End is the "zero-cycle," where players instead scale the End Spikes (obsidian pillars) and damage the dragon with the beds while it is still flying. This strategy is very difficult to perform and makes use of the fact that the dragon always spawns in certain places above the End Spikes, depending on the seed. Zero-cycling has increased in use due to the fact that it removes the need to wait for the dragon to perch on the center fountain, removing "perch luck".

== Competitive scene ==
MCSR Ranked is a Minecraft mod that allows players to compete head-to-head on separate worlds using the same seed. Players gain and lose Elo rating and are ranked on a leaderboard accordingly.

The largest tournament regarding Minecraft speedrunning is the MCSR Ranked Playoffs, which occurs every four months. Players qualify based on their Elo placements throughout the four-month season. The prize pool for this tournament is $5,000.

There are also other community-run tournaments, such as the Girloffs, featuring exclusively female competitors; Most%, where the goal is to get as many in-game advancements as possible in a one-hour time frame; and the Lewis Fulham Invitational, an in-person tournament held in Bournemouth, England.

In June 2026, Ludwig Ahgren hosted the MCSR World Championships in Los Angeles; the tournament brought together 12 of the best Minecraft speedrunners to compete for a $25,000 prize pool. It featured a Free For All stage followed by a single-elimination bracket, with hackingnoises ultimately winning the championship and taking home $10,000, while Feinberg finished as the runner-up.

== World record progression ==
The following step chart shows the progression of the Any% RSG world record for the 1.16–1.19 version range over time.

World record progression for Minecraft: Java Edition Any% glitchless (RSG), versions 1.16–1.19

== See also ==
- Dream, a Minecraft YouTuber and speedrunner known for his Minecraft Manhunt series
