= Heat Waves =

Single by Glass Animals

from the album Dreamland
- Written: May 2018
- Released: 29 June 2020
- Genre: Psychedelic pop; R&B; pop rock
- Length: 3:58
- Label: Wolf Tone; Polydor
- Songwriter: Dave Bayley
- Producer: Dave Bayley

Glass Animals singles chronology
"Dreamland" (2020)	"Heat Waves" (2020)	"It's All So Incredibly Loud" (2020)

Music video
- "Heat Waves" on YouTube

"Heat Waves" is a song by British indie rock band Glass Animals released as a single from their third studio album Dreamland on 29 June 2020.

After initially gaining little attention, the song went on to be the band's signature song and biggest hit single to date. In addition to reaching number five on the UK Singles Chart and being a top-five hit in several other European countries, it reached number one in Australia, Canada, Lithuania, Switzerland and the United States, where it topped the Billboard Hot 100 for five weeks in early 2022 after a record-breaking 59-week climb to number one. At 91 weeks, it became the longest charting song on the Hot 100 of all time, surpassing "Blinding Lights" by The Weeknd. It would later be surpassed by Teddy Swims' "Lose Control" in May 2025. By June 2024, the song had accumulated more than three billion streams on Spotify. At the 2022 Brit Awards, "Heat Waves" was nominated for Best British Single.

== Composition and other versions ==
Glass Animals founder and frontman David Bayley stated that "Heat Waves" "is about loss and longing, and ultimately realising you are unable to save something". He said that "Also, this song is about memories and it's very nostalgic, and sometimes people feel more of that in the winter. Maybe that's part of the reason this song's hung around for so bloody long – everyone's locked inside and trapped in their own thoughts."

"Heat Waves" starts on a high and then drops into despair before rising again for a cheerful, optimistic finale, much like the crests and troughs of a real wave. Bayley came up with the chords one day while playing around on the guitar. He wrote the lyrics in just an hour, prompted by the death of a close friend whose birthday was in June.

In March 2021, the podcast Song Exploder featured an interview with Dave Bayley that specifically discussed the creation of "Heat Waves". He says "weirdly, Johnny Depp was the first person to hear this song." In it, he says that after writing/performing the song late at night alone in the studio, he decided to go home when he realized a stranger was sitting behind him. It was Depp who had been working in another studio.

Bayley also described the song’s production process in the same Song Exploder episode. He explained that the opening guitar riff originated as a phone recording before being developed into the track’s central motif. The arrangement was built by layering elements, including a pitched-down vocal sample used as the bass line. Bayley constructed the vocal harmonies from numerous takes, adding ad-libs to create what he called a “choir of myself.” He emphasized leaving space in the mix by stripping back certain sections so that the lead vocal and beat would stand out.

"Heat Waves" is an example of Dreamland's incorporation of hip hop and electropop elements into Glass Animals' sound. It and "Space Ghost Coast to Coast" rejects the band's acoustic percussion and marimbas in favor of 808 sounds and skittering hi-hats. NME's Hannah Mylrea categorized the song as "earnest R&B run through the Glass Animals filter", and Pitchfork's Ian Cohen argued its guitars "could be plucked from any number of 'wavy hip-hop' sample packs meant to emulate Frank Ocean's 'Ivy' on a bedroom producer's budget". A major theme on Dreamland is the pursuit of brief pleasures to cope with the hardships of life, such as lust for others. On "Heat Waves", Bayley sings repeatedly, "Sometimes all I think about is you/Late nights in the middle of June."

The band ran a remix competition for the track, with 19-year-old British producer Shakur Ahmad winning and having his remix issued by the band, alongside a remix by American DJ Diplo in August 2020. Another remix is a collaboration with American rapper Iann Dior. A piano Simlish version was recorded by Bayley for The Sims 4, and was featured in a limited-time "Sims Sessions" in-game music event in 2021.

Sheet music for this song shows the key of B major (in the C-sharp Dorian mode).

== Critical reception ==
"Heat Waves" was met with positive reviews upon release, with music critics such as Robin Murray, Owen Richards, and Rob Waters praising the song as a "stunningly effective" pop track, "built on a delicious groove and utilising very conventional lyrical structures" while containing enough elements unique to Glass Animals to entice more listeners to them. No Ripcord's Ethan Gordon generally found Dreamland "as momentarily annoying as it is infinitely forgettable" due to its combination of trap percussion and synthesizers being mostly "strained and unpleasant"; however, he considered "Heat Waves" to be the "strongest" mixture of those sounds.

== Commercial performance ==
A sleeper hit, "Heat Waves" is the group's most successful single to date. It was voted into first place on the Australian Triple J Hottest 100 of 2020, making Glass Animals the first British act to top the countdown since Mumford & Sons won the 2009 poll with "Little Lion Man". It then spent seven weeks at the top of the Australian ARIA Singles Chart and was later certified as the number one song for 2021 in Australia. It reached No. 1 in March 2021, stayed there until April 2021, and returned to that position in March 2022. It is the first song ever to stay in the Australian top 10 for more than a year, staying there for 85 weeks. It also reached the top 20 in several territories.

In the United States, "Heat Waves" peaked at number one on the Billboard Hot 100 chart dated 12 March 2022, completing a record-breaking 59-week climb to the position. It dethroned Encanto's "We Don't Talk About Bruno" after five consecutive weeks at number one. "Heat Waves" previously reached number 10 on the Hot 100 in its 42nd week on the chart, breaking the record for the longest climb to the top 10, surpassing Carrie Underwood's "Before He Cheats" (2007). The song also reached the top five in its 51st week on the chart, breaking the record previously set by Gabby Barrett's "I Hope" (2020). The song was in the top 10 up to its 80th week on the chart. No other song in the chart's history has reached such longevity until "Lose Control" in 2025. This longevity has been attributed to, among other things, a popular fan fiction, Heat Waves, which shipped Dream and GeorgeNotFound, two internet personalities best known for playing Minecraft.

On the UK Singles Chart the single originally peaked at number 19 in the first half of 2021. After its inclusion in the EA Sports video game FIFA 21 and wide usage as backing music in various TikTok videos, the song re-entered at number 18 in September 2021 and continued to climb into the top 5. The viral video also helped the song climb back up 31 places to number 14 on the Irish Singles Chart in its 41st week on the chart, before peaking at number 5. The track has spent a total of 22 weeks in the top 10 to date, the most among tracks in 2021. The song reached number one on the Billboard Global 200 in the issue dated 5 March 2022, and also reached the same peak on the Global Excl. US chart.

== Music videos ==
A lyric video heavily based on vaporwave imagery was released through Glass Animals official YouTube account on 30 July 2020. The video was produced by designer Notnarcs. It gained almost 30 million views during its first year on YouTube. As of May 2024, the lyric video on YouTube has amassed over 130 million views.

The official music video for the song, directed by Colin Read, premiered on 29 June 2020. It shows frontman Dave Bayley walking through the streets of East London pulling a wagon stacked with several TVs, filmed by his neighbours using their phones during the COVID-19 lockdowns, before arriving at a venue, setting the TVs up on a stage that then display his bandmates playing their instruments, and singing the rest of the song. Bayley called it "a love letter to live music and the culture and togetherness surrounding it". As of May 2026, the music video has amassed over 900 million views on YouTube.

== Track listing ==
Original release
No.	Title	Length
1.	"Heat Waves"	3:58

Diplo remix
No.	Title	Length
1.	"Heat Waves" (Diplo remix)	2:21

Riton remix
No.	Title	Length
1.	"Heat Waves" (Riton remix)	2:40

Heat Waves (with Iann Dior)
No.	Title	Length
1.	"Heat Waves" (with iann dior)	2:55
2.	"Heat Waves"	3:58

Sonny Fodera remix
No.	Title	Length
1.	"Heat Waves" (Sonny Fodera remix)	3:11

Oliver Heldens remix
No.	Title	Length
1.	"Heat Waves" (Oliver Heldens remix)	4:03

Heat Waves (Expansion Pack)
No.	Title	Length
1.	"Heat Waves"	3:58
2.	"Heat Waves" (Oliver Heldens remix)	4:03
3.	"Heat Waves" (Riton remix)	2:40
4.	"Heat Waves" (Sonny Fodera remix)	3:11

== Personnel ==
Glass Animals

- Dave Bayley – vocals, guitar, keyboards, drums, strings, percussion, producer, recording engineer
- Edmund Irwin-Singer – guitar, programming
- Drew MacFarlane – guitar, strings, programming
- Joe Seaward – drums

Technical personnel

- Riley McIntyre – recording engineer
- Chris Galland – mixing engineer
- Manny Marroquin – mixing engineer
- Chris Gehringer – mastering engineer

== Charts ==
=== Weekly charts ===
Weekly chart performance for "Heat Waves"
Chart (2020–2025)	Peak position
Argentina Hot 100 (Billboard)	97
Australia (ARIA)	1
Austria (Ö3 Austria Top 40)	2
Belarus Airplay (TopHit)	90
Belgium (Ultratop 50 Flanders)	4
Belgium (Ultratop 50 Wallonia)	7
Brazil (Top 100 Brasil)	74
Bulgaria Airplay (PROPHON)	10
Canada Hot 100 (Billboard)	1
Canada AC (Billboard)	42
Canada CHR/Top 40 (Billboard)	22
Canada Hot AC (Billboard)	38
Canada Rock (Billboard)	35
CIS Airplay (TopHit)	19
Croatia (Billboard)	10
Czech Republic Airplay (ČNS IFPI)	29
Czech Republic Singles Digital (ČNS IFPI)	1
Denmark (Tracklisten)	9
Estonia Airplay (TopHit)	32
Finland (Suomen virallinen lista)	7
France (SNEP)	14
Germany (GfK)	2
Global 200 (Billboard)	1
Greece International (IFPI)	2
Hungary (Rádiós Top 40)	6
Hungary (Single Top 40)	4
Hungary (Stream Top 40)	2
Iceland (Tónlistinn)	5
India International (IMI)	1
Indonesia (Billboard)	6
Ireland (IRMA)	5
Italy (FIMI)	35
Kazakhstan Airplay (TopHit)	190
Latvia (LAIPA)	19
Lebanon (Lebanese Top 20)	14
Lithuania (AGATA)	1
Luxembourg (Billboard)	1
Malaysia (RIM)	3
Mexico Airplay (Billboard)	13
Netherlands (Dutch Top 40)	2
Netherlands (Single Top 100)	6
New Zealand (Recorded Music NZ)	2
Norway (VG-lista)	2
Paraguay (SGP)	98
Philippines (Billboard)	20
Poland Airplay (ZPAV)	10
Poland (Polish Streaming Top 100)	70
Portugal (AFP)	4
Romania (UPFR)	6
Romania TV Airplay (Media Forest)	1
Romania Airplay (TopHit)	39
Russia Airplay (TopHit)	29
San Marino (SMRRTV Top 50)	14
Scottish Singles Sales (Official Charts)	73
Singapore (RIAS)	2
Slovakia Airplay (ČNS IFPI)	1
Slovakia Singles Digital (ČNS IFPI)	1
South Africa (TOSAC)	11
Spain (PROMUSICAE)	49
Suriname (Nationale Top 40)	1
Sweden (Sverigetopplistan)	6
Switzerland (Schweizer Hitparade)	1
Ukraine Airplay (TopHit)	257
UK Singles (Official Charts)	5
US Billboard Hot 100	1
US Adult Contemporary (Billboard)	5
US Adult Pop Airplay (Billboard)	1
US Dance Airplay (Billboard)	5
US Hot Rock & Alternative Songs (Billboard)	1
US Pop Airplay (Billboard)	1
US Rock & Alternative Airplay (Billboard)	5
US Rolling Stone Top 100	6
Vietnam (Vietnam Hot 100)	16
Wales (OCC)	33

=== Monthly charts ===
Monthly chart performance for "Heat Waves"
Chart (2022–2023)	Peak position
CIS Airplay (TopHit)	22
Estonia Airplay (TopHit)	53
Romania Airplay (TopHit)	43
Russia Airplay (TopHit)	31

=== Year-end charts ===
2020 year-end chart performance for "Heat Waves"
Chart (2020)	Position
US Hot Rock & Alternative Songs (Billboard)	49
Chart (2021)	Position
Australia (ARIA)	1
Austria (Ö3 Austria Top 40)	12
Belgium (Ultratop Flanders)	31
Canada (Canadian Hot 100)	13
Denmark (Tracklisten)	36
France (SNEP)	84
Germany (Official German Charts)	19
Global 200 (Billboard)	17
Hungary (Stream Top 40)	24
Iceland (Tónlistinn)	25
India International (IMI)	11
Ireland (IRMA)	6
Netherlands (Dutch Top 40)	29
Netherlands (Single Top 100)	24
New Zealand (Recorded Music NZ)	1
Norway (VG-lista)	15
Portugal (AFP)	25
Sweden (Sverigetopplistan)	32
Switzerland (Schweizer Hitparade)	9
UK Singles (OCC)	8
US Billboard Hot 100	16
US Hot Rock & Alternative Songs (Billboard)	2
US Mainstream Top 40 (Billboard)	46
US Rock Airplay (Billboard)	19
Chart (2022)	Position
Australia (ARIA)	2
Austria (Ö3 Austria Top 40)	1
Belgium (Ultratop 50 Flanders)	10
Belgium (Ultratop 50 Wallonia)	14
Brazil (Pro-Música Brasil)	140
Canada (Canadian Hot 100)	3
CIS Airplay (TopHit)	40
Croatia International Airplay (Top lista)	46
Denmark (Tracklisten)	21
Germany (Official German Charts)	2
Global 200 (Billboard)	2
Hungary (Rádiós Top 40)	28
Hungary (Single Top 40)	52
Hungary (Stream Top 40)	11
Italy (FIMI)	49
Lithuania (AGATA)	2
Netherlands (Dutch Top 40)	51
Netherlands (Single Top 100)	9
New Zealand (Recorded Music NZ)	3
Poland (ZPAV)	35
Russia Airplay (TopHit)	85
Sweden (Sverigetopplistan)	10
Switzerland (Schweizer Hitparade)	1
UK Singles (OCC)	7
US Billboard Hot 100	1
US Adult Contemporary (Billboard)	10
US Adult Top 40 (Billboard)	3
US Hot Rock & Alternative Songs (Billboard)	1
US Mainstream Top 40 (Billboard)	3
Vietnam (Vietnam Hot 100)	45
Chart (2023)	Position
Australia (ARIA)	18
Austria (Ö3 Austria Top 40)	43
CIS Airplay (TopHit)	133
Estonia Airplay (TopHit)	84
Germany (Official German Charts)	68
Global 200 (Billboard)	30
Hungary (Rádiós Top 40)	40
New Zealand (Recorded Music NZ)	33
Romania Airplay (TopHit)	115
Switzerland (Schweizer Hitparade)	32
UK Singles (OCC)	50
US Adult Contemporary (Billboard)	31
Chart (2024)	Position
Australia (ARIA)	65
Australia Dance (ARIA)	5
Estonia Airplay (TopHit)	196
Global 200 (Billboard)	87
Hungary (Rádiós Top 40)	99
India International (IMI)	11

== Certifications ==
Certifications for "Heat Waves"
Region	Certification	Certified units/sales
Australia (ARIA)	23× Platinum	1,610,000^{‡}
Austria (IFPI Austria)	5× Platinum	150,000^{‡}
Brazil (Pro-Música Brasil)	3× Diamond	480,000^{‡}
Canada (Music Canada)	Diamond	800,000^{‡}
Denmark (IFPI Danmark)	3× Platinum	270,000^{‡}
France (SNEP)	Diamond	333,333^{‡}
Germany (BVMI)	Diamond	1,000,000^{‡}
India (IMI)	51× Platinum	6,120,000
Italy (FIMI)	4× Platinum	400,000^{‡}
New Zealand (RMNZ)	8× Platinum	240,000^{‡}
Poland (ZPAV)	Diamond	250,000^{‡}
Portugal (AFP)	6× Platinum	60,000^{‡}
Spain (Promusicae)	2× Platinum	120,000^{‡}
Switzerland (IFPI Switzerland)	6× Platinum	120,000^{‡}
United Kingdom (BPI)	6× Platinum	3,600,000^{‡}
United States (RIAA)	Diamond	10,000,000^{‡}
Streaming
Central America (CFC)	2× Platinum	14,000,000^{†}
Greece (IFPI Greece)	3× Platinum	6,000,000^{†}
Sweden (GLF)	3× Platinum	24,000,000^{†}
^{‡} Sales+streaming figures based on certification alone.^{†} Streaming-only figures based on certification alone.

== Release history ==
Release history for "Heat Waves"
Region	Date	Format	Label	Ref.
United States	2 March 2021	Contemporary hit radio	Republic	

== See also ==
- List of highest-certified singles in Australia
- List of Billboard Hot 100 number ones of 2022
- List of Canadian Hot 100 number-one singles of 2022
