= Olivia, Minnesota =

City in Minnesota, United States

Olivia
- City
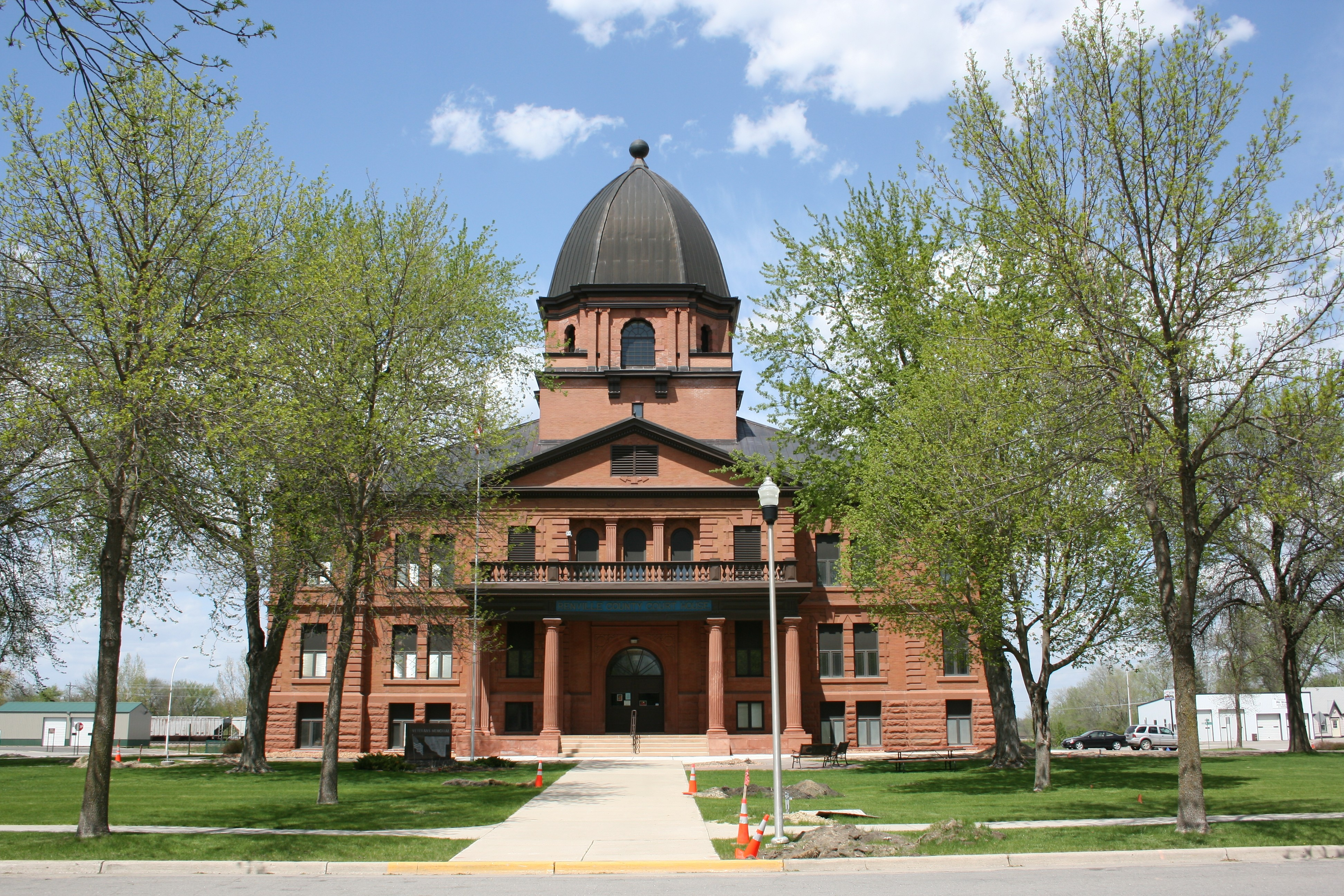
- Renville County Courthouse
- Motto: "The Corn Capital of the World"
- Location of Olivia within Renville County, Minnesota
- Coordinates: 44°46′37″N 94°59′50″W
- Country: United States
- State: Minnesota
- County: Renville

Government
  - Mayor: Jon Hawkinson

Area
  - Total: 2.45 sq mi (6.35 km^{2})
  - Land: 2.45 sq mi (6.35 km^{2})
  - Water: 0 sq mi (0.00 km^{2})
- Elevation: 1,070 ft (330 m)

Population (2020)
  - Total: 2,343
  - Density: 955.3/sq mi (368.83/km^{2})
- Time zone: UTC-6 (Central (CST))
  - Summer (DST): UTC-5 (CDT)
- ZIP code: 56277
- Area code: 320
- FIPS code: 27-48256
- GNIS feature ID: 2396057
- Website: https://www.olivia.mn.us/

Olivia is the county seat of Renville County, Minnesota, United States. Its population was 2,343 at the 2020 census.

== History ==
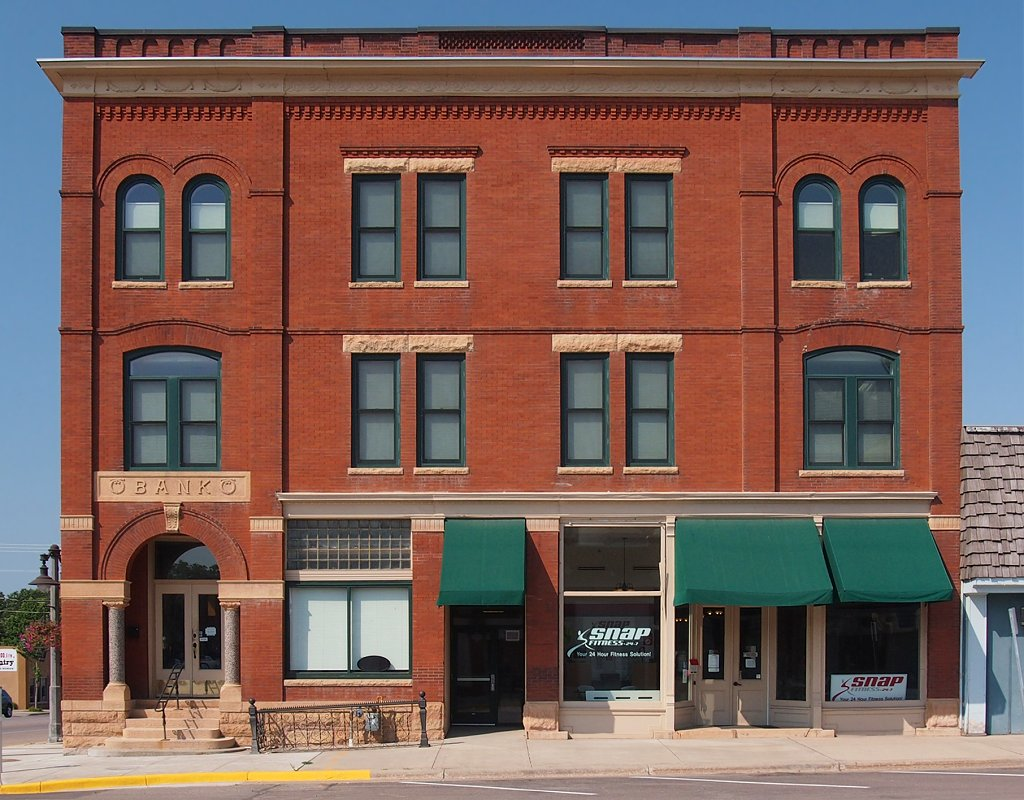
Heins Block

Olivia was platted in 1878, and named for a female station agent named Olive, according to local history. A post office has been in operation at Olivia since 1879. The county seat moved from Beaver Falls to Olivia in 1900.

== Geography ==
According to the United States Census Bureau, the city has an area of 2.34 square miles (6.06 km^{2}), all land.

U.S. Highways 71 and 212 are two of the main routes in the city.

== Demographics ==
Historical population
Census	Pop.	Note	%±
1880	48		—
1890	263		447.9%
1900	970		268.8%
1910	960		−1.0%
1920	1,488		55.0%
1930	1,475		−0.9%
1940	1,788		21.2%
1950	2,012		12.5%
1960	2,355		17.0%
1970	2,553		8.4%
1980	2,802		9.8%
1990	2,623		−6.4%
2000	2,570		−2.0%
2010	2,484		−3.3%
2020	2,343		−5.7%
U.S. Decennial Census

=== 2020 census ===
As of the 2020 census, Olivia had a population of 2,343. The median age was 41.2 years. 22.7% of residents were under the age of 18 and 21.6% of residents were 65 years of age or older. For every 100 females there were 104.5 males, and for every 100 females age 18 and over there were 100.9 males age 18 and over.

0.0% of residents lived in urban areas, while 100.0% lived in rural areas.

There were 1,020 households in Olivia, of which 27.1% had children under the age of 18 living in them. Of all households, 44.5% were married-couple households, 21.0% were households with a male householder and no spouse or partner present, and 26.6% were households with a female householder and no spouse or partner present. About 36.1% of all households were made up of individuals and 18.1% had someone living alone who was 65 years of age or older.

There were 1,147 housing units, of which 11.1% were vacant. The homeowner vacancy rate was 3.4% and the rental vacancy rate was 16.0%.

Racial composition as of the 2020 census
Race	Number	Percent
White	2,128	90.8%
Black or African American	25	1.1%
American Indian and Alaska Native	3	0.1%
Asian	5	0.2%
Native Hawaiian and Other Pacific Islander	0	0.0%
Some other race	61	2.6%
Two or more races	121	5.2%
Hispanic or Latino (of any race)	229	9.8%

=== 2010 census ===
As of the census of 2010, there were 2,484 people, 1,038 households, and 653 families living in the city. The population density was 1,061.5 inhabitants per square mile (409.8/km^{2}). There were 1,142 housing units at an average density of 488.0 per square mile (188.4/km^{2}). The racial makeup of the city was 93.9% White, 1.0% African American, 0.4% Native American, 0.2% Asian, 3.7% from other races, and 0.8% from two or more races. Hispanic or Latino of any race were 8.3% of the population.

There were 1,038 households, of which 28.0% had children under the age of 18 living with them, 47.6% were married couples living together, 10.8% had a female householder with no husband present, 4.5% had a male householder with no wife present, and 37.1% were non-families. 31.9% of all households were made up of individuals, and 13.1% had someone living alone who was 65 years of age or older. The average household size was 2.28 and the average family size was 2.85.

The median age in the city was 40.8 years. 23.7% of residents were under the age of 18; 7.7% were between the ages of 18 and 24; 23.1% were from 25 to 44; 25.5% were from 45 to 64; and 19.9% were 65 years of age or older. The gender makeup of the city was 49.2% male and 50.8% female.

=== 2000 census ===
As of the census of 2000, there were 2,570 people, 1,075 households, and 658 families living in the city. The population density was 1,102.7 inhabitants per square mile (425.8/km^{2}). There were 1,178 housing units at an average density of 505.4 per square mile (195.1/km^{2}). The racial makeup of the city was 96.19% White, 0.12% African American, 0.12% Native American, 0.12% Asian, 2.57% from other races, and 0.89% from two or more races. Hispanic or Latino of any race were 7.63% of the population.

There were 1,075 households, out of which 28.2% had children under the age of 18 living with them, 52.2% were married couples living together, 6.1% had a female householder with no husband present, and 38.7% were non-families. 35.1% of all households were made up of individuals, and 18.1% had someone living alone who was 65 years of age or older. The average household size was 2.30 and the average family size was 3.00.

In the city, the population was spread out, with 24.7% under the age of 18, 7.2% from 18 to 24, 23.5% from 25 to 44, 22.8% from 45 to 64, and 21.8% who were 65 years of age or older. The median age was 41 years. For every 100 females, there were 93.2 males. For every 100 females age 18 and over, there were 92.4 males.

The median income for a household in the city was $35,060, and the median income for a family was $44,781. Males had a median income of $31,793 versus $25,541 for females. The per capita income for the city was $17,889. About 6.0% of families and 11.3% of the population were below the poverty line, including 17.2% of those under age 18 and 10.6% of those age 65 or over.

== Education ==
Olivia's school system is partnered with Bird Island and Lake Lillian, and operates under the name BOLD Schools (Bird Island, Olivia, Lake Lillian District). The school mascot is the BOLD Warrior. The BOLD high school is in Olivia and the elementary school is in Bird Island. Bird Island also has a Catholic school.

== Corn Capital of the World ==
The Minnesota Senate has designated Olivia the "Corn Capital of the World". Olivia has been calling itself the "Corn Capital of the World" since 1973, when it erected its well-known 50-foot corn monument in the shape of an ear of corn.

Olivia is the home to nine seed research facilities. It is in the middle of Renville County, Minnesota's leading producer of corn.

=== Corn Capital Days ===
Olivia celebrates Corn Capital Days during the last weekend of July. Activities include a parade, corncob toss, corn-lympics, free corn feed, kiddie parade, Lion's walk-in, fly-in, drive-in breakfast, and live music.

== Notable people ==
- Blix Donnelly (1914–1976), baseball player
- Michael J. Dowling (1866–1921), speaker of the Minnesota House of Representatives
- Darwin Hall (1844–1919), U.S. representative from Minnesota
- Paul F. Heard (1913–1964), producer, director, and scriptwriter of religious films
- Roger Reinert (born 1970), Minnesota state senator and mayor of Duluth
- Thomas Joseph Simmons (1932–2002), Minnesota state representative
- Kathleen Winsor (1919–2003), author of Forever Amber
- Tom Ruud (born 1953), football player

== Media ==
=== Television ===
Channel	Callsign	Affiliation	Branding	Subchannels		Owner
(Virtual)	Callsign	Affiliation	Branding	Channel	Programming	Owner
4.1	K18IR-D (WCCO Translator)	CBS	WCCO 4	4.2	Start TV	Renville County Television Corporation
5.1	K21NS-D (KSTP Translator)	ABC	5 Eyewitness News	5.7	Heroes & Icons	Renville County Television Corporation
5.2	K31OR-D (KSTC Translator)	Ind.	45 TV	5.3; 5.4; 5.6	Me-TV; Antenna TV; This TV	Renville County Television Corporation
9.1	K34OZ-D (WFTC Translator)	FOX	FOX 9	9.2; 9.3	FOX 9+ Movies!	Renville County Television Corporation
10.1	K20JY-D (KWCM Translator)	PBS	Pioneer Public TV	10.2; 10.3; 10.4; 10.5	Create; Minnesota Channel; World; PBS Kids	Renville County Television Corporation
11.1	K23FP-D (KARE Translator)	NBC	KARE 11	11.2; 11.3; 11.4	Court TV; True Crime Network; Quest	Renville County Television Corporation
