= To Whoever Wants to Hear =

2023 EP by Dream

EP by Dream
- Released: September 1, 2023
- Genre: Pop
- Length: 17:02
- Label: Mercury; Republic
- Producer: Gian Stone; Andrew Goldstein; Russ Chell; Y2K; Lil Aaron

Singles from To Whoever Wants to Hear
- 1. "Until I End Up Dead" Released: June 23, 2023; 2. "Everest" Released: July 28, 2023

Professional ratings
Review scores
Source	Rating
AllMusic	3.5/5 stars

To Whoever Wants to Hear (stylized in all lowercase) is the debut EP by American YouTuber and musician Dream. It was released by Mercury Records and Republic Records on September 1, 2023. The EP was preceded by the release of two singles – its lead single "Until I End Up Dead", which Dream wrote in honor of Technoblade, a friend of Dream's who died due to cancer in 2022, and "Everest", a duet with Yung Gravy. The EP reached number 173 on the Billboard 200.

== Commercial performance ==
The EP debuted at No. 173 on the US Billboard 200. On the UK Albums Downloads Chart, To Whoever Wants to Hear debuted at No. 74, marking Dream's first entry on that chart.

== Track listing ==
To Whoever Wants to Hear track listing
No.	Title	Writer(s)	Producer(s)	Length
1.	"Slow Down"	Dream; Gian Stone; Sean Douglas	Gian Stone	2:34
2.	"Kind of Love"	Dream; Andrew Goldstein; Joe Kirkland	Andrew Goldstein	2:16
3.	"Paranoid"	Dream; Andrew Goldstein; Joe Kirkland	Andrew Goldstein	1:54
4.	"Spotlight"	Dream; Russell Chell; Wes Period	Russell Chell	2:46
5.	"Everest" (with Yung Gravy)	Dream; Y2K; Yung Gravy; Lil Aaron; Sheldon Yu-Ting Cheung; Smrtdeath	Y2K; Lil Aaron; Sully	2:21
6.	"Invincible (Like U)"	Dream; Russell Chell; Wes Period	Russell Chell	2:52
7.	"Until I End Up Dead"	Dream; Andrew Goldstein; Joe Kirkland	Andrew Goldstein	2:15
Total length:				17:02

== Personnel ==
- Dream – performances, songwriting
- Yung Gravy – performance (track 5)
- Gian Stone – production (track 1)
- Andrew Goldstein – production (tracks 1, 2, 3, 7)
- Russ Chell – production (track 4 and 6)
- Y2K – co–production (track 5)
- Lil Aaron – co–production (track 5)
- Sully – co–production (track 5)

== Charts ==
Chart performance for To Whoever Wants to Hear
Chart (2023)	Peak position
UK Album Downloads (OCC)	74
US Billboard 200	173
