= Karl Jacobs =

American YouTuber (born 1998)

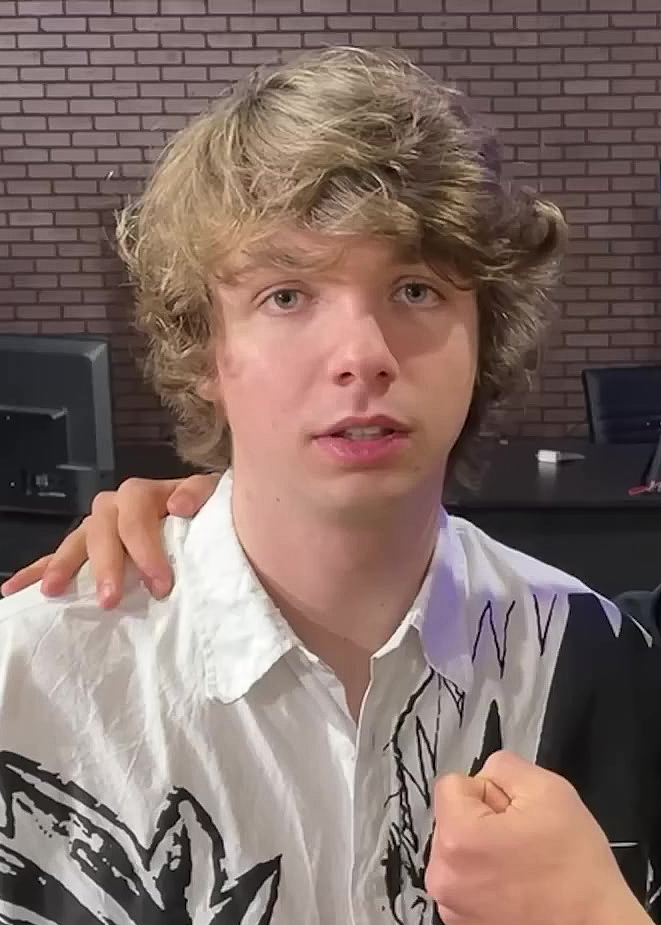
- Jacobs in 2023
- Born: Karl Thomas Jacobs; July 19, 1998 (age 28); New York, U.S.
- Other name: GamerBoyKarl
- Occupations: YouTuber; Live streamer

Twitch information
- Channel: karljacobs
- Years active: 2017–present
- Followers: 3.5 million

YouTube information
- Channel: Karl
- Years active: 2017–present
- Genre: Gaming
- Subscribers: 7.19 million
- Views: 1.4 billion
- Last updated: October 31, 2026

Karl Thomas Jacobs (born July 19, 1998), formerly known online as GamerBoyKarl, is an American YouTuber. He rose to prominence as a member of MrBeast's on-screen cast and then developed his own videos, primarily Minecraft content. Jacobs is the creator of the anthology series Tales from the SMP set in the Dream SMP, which was adapted into a series of comic books published by Dark Horse Comics. He was also a co-host of the Banter podcast with fellow YouTubers Sapnap and GeorgeNotFound.

== Career ==
Jacobs began streaming on Twitch in 2017, playing Roblox under the name GamerBoyKarl. In 2019, he was hired as a video editor for YouTuber MrBro. Jacobs then became a cameraman for MrBro's brother, YouTuber MrBeast, before transitioning into a member of MrBeast's on-screen cast. During a video for MrBeast Gaming, Jacobs met Minecraft YouTuber Dream, and was later invited to join his server, the Dream SMP.

In December 2020, Jacobs created the online anthology series Tales from the SMP, which explores the story of characters in the Dream SMP by following Jacobs's time-travelling character to various times and locations throughout the server. The series has featured internet personalities such as Dream and Corpse Husband. The season two pilot, titled "The Maze", premiered on February 11, 2022. In August 2022, Jacobs announced that stories from his series Tales from the SMP would be adapted as a series of comic books titled Time Traveler Tales for Dark Horse Comics. The series is written by Dave Scheidt and illustrated by Kelly and Nichole Matthews. The series was released in five issues between December 2023 and April 2024. A collected trade paperback edition, published by Dark Horse Books, was released on August 13, 2024, compiling Time Traveler Tales #1–#5.

In September 2021, Jacobs started a podcast with fellow Minecraft YouTuber Sapnap titled Banter. Following the release of the first episode, which featured MrBeast, Banter briefly overtook The Joe Rogan Experience as the number one podcast on Spotify. On August 6, 2022, GeorgeNotFound publicly debuted as the third host on the podcast.

In March 2022, Jacobs was announced to be the creative ambassador for shoe retailer Journeys. On November 9, the game Once Upon a Jester was launched on Steam, with Jacobs voicing several characters. On November 14, 2022, Jacobs released his first animated short titled Beside Myself. The short featured Jacobs as writer and producer, Elenor Kopka as animator and director, and Richie Woods as music composer.

On September 24, 2022, Jacobs participated in the 2022 Sidemen Charity Football Match, playing for the Sidemen team against the YouTube Allstars team. The event managed to raised more than £1,000,000 for four U.K. based charities: Campaign Against Living Miserably, Teenage Cancer Trust, Rays of Sunshine, and M7 Education. A year later he participated again in the 2023 Sidemen Charity Football Match, this time playing for the YouTube Allstars team. The event managed to raised more than £2,400,000 for various charities.

On April 25, 2024, Jacobs released an animated short titled Journeyed Home. The short was primarily written and produced by Jacobs, directed and animated by Kevin Bissell, and music was composed by Temporex, Spellcasting, and Boys Age. Several of Jacobs's collaborators and fellow content creators, including Spreen and TinaKitten, cameo as voice actors.

== Awards and nominations ==
Year	Ceremony	Category	Result	Ref.
2021	11th Streamy Awards	Breakout Creator	Nominated	
2022	The Game Awards 2022	Content Creator of the Year	Nominated	
2024	Forbes 30 Under 30	Games	Included	
