= Skeppy =

Skeppy may refer to:

- Skeppy (YouTuber), a member of the Dream SMP
- Skepta (rapper), a rapper

== See also ==
- Succulent Karoo, supported by a fund called "SKEPPIES"
