= Dream SMP =

Minecraft multiplayer server

- Dream SMP characters; each skin is used by a different Minecraft personality.
- Developer: Dream; GeorgeNotFound; BadBoyHalo
- Type: Minecraft server
- Launched: April 24, 2020; 6 years ago
- Discontinued: October 27, 2024; 2 years ago
- Platforms: Minecraft: Java Edition; Twitch; YouTube
- Status: Offline
- Members: See § Cast

The Dream SMP (sometimes referred to as DSMP) was an invite-only survival multiplayer (Note: In Minecraft, "Survival Mode" denotes the main game mode, where the player starts out with no items, has health and can die, as opposed to "Creative Mode" where players are immortal and can spawn in infinite items.) (SMP) Minecraft server founded by YouTubers Dream and GeorgeNotFound.

Participants played fictionalized versions of themselves in a loose storyline and livestreamed on Twitch and YouTube; the SMP became a popular Minecraft web series. The server officially shut down on April 10, 2023.

== History and plot ==
The Dream SMP was created by Dream and GeorgeNotFound in April or May 2020 (Note: Game Rant and Business Insider approximate its forming in April 2020, while Insider and Dot Esports claim its forming date as May 2020.) as a small private server for a few friends. The server was hosted by BadBoyHalo, as he owned several servers for MunchyMC. It quickly gained popularity, in part due to the COVID-19 pandemic and collaborations across various Twitch and YouTube channels. It starred fellow Minecraft YouTubers Sapnap and TommyInnit, who roleplayed as characters loosely based on themselves. They engaged in lengthy conflicts over political power and rare artifacts.

Most content was improvised, apart from major plot points which were loosely scripted in advance. Wilbur Soot, who planned many of the early story arcs, said in an interview for Insider, "I write up a series of plot hooks and points that should tie together, however we improv[ise] dialogue and comedy throughout to take us from point to point." The server had over 20 "eras" in its plotline and over 30 characters as of August 2021. The server's early storyline was inspired by Hamilton, and the musical was referenced many times by the server members.

Within the plot, characters could die up to three times before being permanently dead. Some members played multiple characters, including ghost versions of themselves. Dream used a separate Minecraft account to play as DreamXD, the god of the Dream SMP and who has canon access to creative mode.

The Disc Saga, the server's longest-running story arc, was a series of events centered around two rare music discs belonging to TommyInnit. Throughout the saga, Dream and other characters fought over ownership of the discs, and used them as leverage against each other. The Disc Saga concluded in January 2021, with Dream being imprisoned. TommyInnit's Twitch broadcast of the events peaked at over 650,000 viewers, making it the third-highest all-time concurrent viewer livestream on the platform.

The flag of L'Manburg

Another conflict broke out when Wilbur Soot founded L'Manburg (July 2020), an in-game breakaway state for non-American players. It seceded from the Greater Dream SMP nation and won a war for independence. L'Manburg would later hold a presidential election, which involved heated roleplay debates between the fictional political parties SWAG2020 and POG2020. When SWAG2020 running mate GeorgeNotFound failed to show up, Quackity, the presidential candidate for the party, formed an impromptu coalition party with jschlatt, SchWAG2020. This coalition party went on to win the election with 46 percent of the vote. In January 2021, L'Manburg would go on to be invaded, destroyed, and permanently disbanded. It was blown up by Dream on January 6.

The heavy emphasis on the roleplaying aspect of the server and their overarching plots attracted significant attention. According to Rich Stanton of PC Gamer, "L'Manburg was taken very seriously by its players, to the extent the nation has not only a flag but a national anthem." The plot was likened to live theater by Cecilia D'Anastasio of Wired, describing it as a "Machiavellian political drama". Ryan Broderick of Polygon described the server's plot as being played out like "a silly Game of Thrones with anime pacing", and described the story's characters as being "not unlike how the wrestler John Cena plays the wrestler John Cena inside the narrative of WWE". The Disc Saga was described by Julia Alexander of The Verge as a "dramatic tale of good versus evil" as Dream and TommyInnit fought over dominance in the server.

In a 2022 interview with Variety, Dream said that the Dream SMP was just Minecraft being used as a storytelling medium as opposed to being an actual game, with GeorgeNotFound adding they do not actually "really" play Minecraft when doing Dream SMP streams.

In November 2022, TommyInnit and Tubbo did four consecutive live streams on Twitch, starting on November 10 and ending on November 13, describing them as the Dream SMP season 1 finale. These four streams concluded with the server being blown up by Tubbo and Jack Manifold. The last part of the stream featured Dream, TommyInnit, and Tubbo appearing on a new world with no memories of what had happened earlier in the stream. Tubbo later announced that all subsequent finale streams will end in the server blowing up, calling it "The Event." In the same stream, he hinted that season 2 may have references to season 1.

In March 2023, Dream announced that there would likely be no season 2; in response, CaptainPuffy uploaded over 300 images taken of locations on the server at various stages on her website.

Several members streamed on the SMP together on April 10, 2023, to defeat the Ender Dragon (a boss in Minecraft), which was inaccessible until that day due to Dream's rules.

On 27 October 2024, Jack Manifold, Tubbo and TommyInnit logged back onto the Dream SMP to deliver a conclusion to their character's arcs and finalize their storylines. It was streamed on Manifold's Twitch channel.

== Cultural impact ==
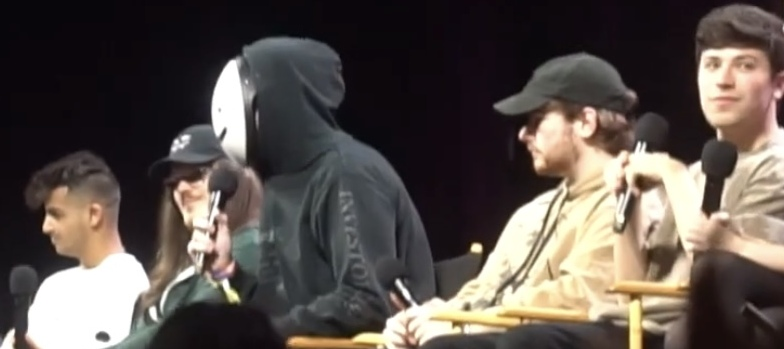
The Dream Team Panel at VidCon 2023, containing members of the Dream SMP. From left to right: Skeppy, BadBoyHalo, Dream, Sapnap, GeorgeNotFound

The Dream SMP garnered a large following and a popular fandom, with hundreds of thousands of viewers turning up for live events. A panel during VidCon 2022 featuring 13 creators from the Dream SMP garnered a live audience of over 2,000 people, described as an exception within the convention that had otherwise been quieter since the previous year, in addition to 135 thousand viewers over livestream. Its fanbase consisted of a large portion of female and LGBTQ fans, particularly teenagers. Content creators and fans of the Dream SMP have been the subjects of cringe culture. In September 2021, Benjamin Herold of The Hechinger Report said that the Dream SMP "helped millions of kids stay connected to the social world" during the COVID-19 pandemic.

Its storylines are analyzed in documentary-style videos, such as those of MatPat, who describes the series as "narrative storytelling through the lens of gaming". Broderick attributed the Dream SMP's unprecedented success to how its story is showcased, describing it as being "a profound idea [that] essentially turns viewers into their own directors, hopping through streams to see which version of the story they want to focus on".

The server's storylines have inspired fan art, fan fiction, animations, and online musicals. Although unusual for an online creator, Dream encouraged fan fiction to be written about him, stating that it ultimately helps his career. One notable fan creator is Sad-ist, an animator from the Philippines who illustrates events from the server's story set to music and dialogue clips.

On July 24, 2021, the flag of L'Manburg was spotted at an anti-vaccine protest in London, next to a Donald Trump flag.

=== In popular culture ===
The Verge described the Dream SMP as a "worldwide phenomenon", with Dream SMP fans creating large amounts of fan fiction, fan art and fan songs. A notable fan work, Heat Waves, a Dream SMP fan fiction hosted on Archive of Our Own, reached the top three in kudos on the website. It is named after the song "Heat Waves" by Glass Animals, and has been suggested in media coverage as a contributing factor to the song's popularity, including its performance in the 2020 Triple J Hottest 100.

“Dream SMP” appeared as a genre label on Spotify, receiving media attention after appearing in Spotify Wrapped in late 2021. The label reflected artists commonly streamed by Dream SMP fans, including some with no direct tie to the project, such as Glass Animals and Toby Fox. Several of the artists included under the label objected to the categorization.

The server was visited by several notable guest stars, including KSI, Vikkstar123, LazarBeam, Ninja, Lil Nas X, Pokimane, Corpse Husband, and MrBeast.

== Cast ==
List adapted primarily from Dot Esports.

=== Main cast ===
==== Founding members ====
- Awesamdude
- BadBoyHalo
- Callahan
- Dream
- GeorgeNotFound
- ItsAlyssa
- Sapnap
- Ponk

==== Subsequent members ====
===== Joined in 2020 =====
- Antfrost
- CaptainPuffy
- ConnorEatsPants
- Eret
- Fundy
- HBomb94
- Jack Manifold
- jschlatt
- Karl Jacobs
- LazarBeam
- Nihachu
- Ph1LzA
- Punz
- Purpled
- Quackity
- Ranboo
- Regan_6698
- Skeppy
- TommyInnit
- Tubbo
- Vikkstar123
- Wilbur Soot

===== Joined in 2021 =====
- BoomerNA
- Eryn
- Foolish Gamers
- Hannahxxrose
- Michaelmcchill
- Slimecicle
- TinaKitten

===== Joined in 2022 =====
- Aimsey
- Seapeekay

=== Former members ===
- ItsAlyssa (2020; unknown, Dream did not give her the new IP address for the server, multiple reasons for leaving)
- Jikishi (2021; banned following grooming accusations)
- Manatreed (2022; removed by Dream)
- Technoblade (2020–2022; due to his death)

=== Guest appearances ===
- Andrea Botez
- Corpse Husband
- Dream's sister (nicknamed "Drista" by TommyInnit) (Note: Joined via Dream's Minecraft account)
- Iskall85 (Note: On screenshare with ItsFundy)
- JustaMinx
- JustVurb (Note: Joined on Skeppy's account)
- KSI (Note: KSI joined twice on his own account, once on a Quackity stream and again in a TommyInnit video, with an appearance on a Ph1lZa stream.)
- Tubbo's sister, Lani, known online as LanuSky (Note: Joined on Tubbo's account twice, once with TommyInnit, and again with only Tubbo)
- Technodad (Technoblade's Father)
- Lil Nas X
- LukeyTV
- Michael Clifford from 5 Seconds of Summer
- MrBeast (Note: MrBeast hosted several events on the Dream SMP, including a promotion of #TeamSeas.)
- Ninja
- Pokimane
- Karl Jacobs' brother, Sean (Note: Joined on Karl Jacobs' account)
- Skeppy's assistant, Lya, who pretended to be Skeppy's sister (Note: Joined on Skeppy's account)
- Onilexy
- Spifey
- Cypher
- Ph1LzA's wife, Kristin, known online as Misstrixtin (Note: Joined on Ph1LzA's account many times, and also contributed a character in the storyline)
- DaquavisMC
- AverageHarry (Note: Joined via Jack Manifold's account as an incentive for charity)
- Sarge
