= Thomas Joseph Simmons =

American lawyer and politician (1932–2002)

Thomas Joseph Simmons (July 6, 1932 – April 10, 2002) was an American lawyer and politician.

April 10, 2002 (aged 69)

== Biography ==
Simmons was born on July 6, 1932, in Renville County, Minnesota. He served in the United States Army, Simmons received his bachelor's degree from the College of Saint Benedict and Saint John's University and his law degree from William Mitchell College of Law. Simmons was admitted to the Minnesota bar. He lived in Olivia, Minnesota with his wife and family. Simmons served as the Renville County Attorney. He also served in the Minnesota House of Representatives in 1971 and 1972. He died on April 10, 2002, in Olivia, Minnesota.
