= Sapnap =

American YouTube personality (born 2001)

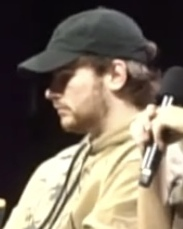
- Sapnap in 2023
- Born: Nicholas; March 1, 2001 (age 25); Texas, U.S.
- Occupations: YouTuber; livestreamer

Kick information
- Channel: Sapnap
- Years active: 2023–present
- Genre: Gaming
- Games: Minecraft; Valorant
- Followers: 40.6 thousand

Twitch information
- Years active: 2019–present
- Genre: Gaming
- Games: Minecraft; Valorant
- Followers: 3.2 million (main channel); 4.6 million (combined) (Note: Twitch followers, broken down by channel: 3.3 million (Sapnap); 1.2 million (sapnaplive))

YouTube information
- Channel: Sapnap
- Years active: 2019–present
- Genre: Gaming
- Subscribers: 4.5 million (main channel); 5.62 million (combined) (Note: YouTube subscribers, broken down by channel: 4.5 million (Sapnap); 0.78 million (SapnapLIVE); 0.00225 million (SapnapVods))
- Views: 133.35 million (main channel); 160.74 million (combined) (Note: YouTube views, broken down by channel: 164.9 million (Sapnap); 31.4 million (SapnapLIVE); 0.133 million (SapnapVods))

Nicholas (born March 1, 2001), better known online as Sapnap, is an American YouTuber and livestreamer known for his Minecraft content. Along with Dream and GeorgeNotFound, he is part of the Dream Team and was a founding member of the Dream SMP Minecraft server. He has co-owned NRG Esports since 2022.

== Career ==
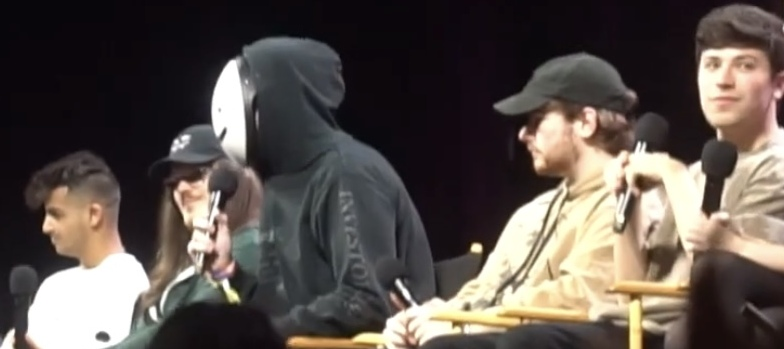
The Dream Team Panel at VidCon 2023. From left to right: Skeppy, BadBoyHalo, Dream, Sapnap, GeorgeNotFound

Sapnap uploaded his first YouTube video on October 20, 2019. He became known for his collaborations with fellow Minecraft personalities Dream and GeorgeNotFound, known collectively as the "Dream Team" since 2019. His videos with the group often featured Minecraft speedrunning challenges. He began streaming on Twitch, and in early 2020 he was the fourth person to join the roleplay-based Dream SMP Minecraft server, after Dream, GeorgeNotFound, and Callahan.

Sapnap has often participated in MC Championship events and consistently ranked as one of the tournament's strongest players. He has also competed in Squid Craft Games, an event organized by Spanish-speaking Minecraft creators, and won the second edition in March 2023. He is known especially for his player versus player (PvP) skills. In addition to Minecraft, his livestreams have included games such as Valorant, Fortnite and Counter-Strike: Global Offensive. He has taken part in Twitch chess tournaments such as PogChamps. He has appeared in several YouTube videos by MrBeast, including one in which he won a ten-person game of tag.

Sapnap started hosting the Banter podcast with YouTuber Karl Jacobs in September 2021. Upon the release of the first episode, which featured MrBeast, the show briefly overtook The Joe Rogan Experience as Spotify's top podcast. GeorgeNotFound joined as co-host in August 2022.

In October 2022, Sapnap signed with and became a co-owner of NRG Esports. He announced that he would begin livestreaming on the site Kick in August 2023.

On February 4, 2025, it was announced that Sapnap would partake in an influencer boxing match for charity on the Creator Clash 3 undercard. His opponent was revealed to be fellow former Dream SMP member Tubbo, taking place at the middleweight weight class. The event was set to take place on June 28 at the Amalie Arena in Tampa, Florida. However, on May 29, the event was postponed to October 25 and was moved to the Hollywood Palladium in Los Angeles, California. On July 8, Creator Clash 3 was officially cancelled.

== Personal life ==
Sapnap was born in Texas on March 1, 2001. He moved to Orlando, Florida, in 2021 to live with Dream, and the next year they were joined in the "Dream Team House" by GeorgeNotFound.

== See also ==
- List of YouTubers
- List of most-followed Twitch channels
