= GeorgeNotFound =

English internet personality (born 1996)

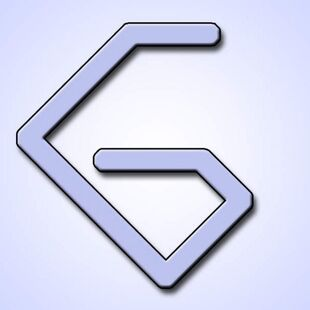
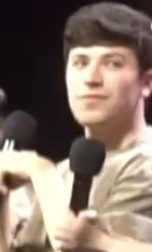
- Davidson in 2023
- Born: George Davidson; 1 November 1996 (age 29); London, England
- Other name: GNF
- Occupations: YouTuber; Twitch streamer

Twitch information
- Channels: GeorgeNotFound; ThisIsNotGeorgeNotFound
- Years active: 2019–present
- Genre: Gaming
- Games: Minecraft; Counter-Strike: Global Offensive; Among Us; GeoGuessr; SpeedRunners
- Followers: 5.1 million (main); 6.5 million (combined) (Note: Followers, broken down by channel: 5.1 million (GeorgeNotFound); 1.4 million (ThisIsNotGeorgeNotFound))

YouTube information
- Channel: GeorgeNotFound
- Years active: 2019–present
- Genre: Gaming
- Subscribers: 9.78 million (main); 14.6 million (combined) (Note: Subscribers, broken down by channel: 9.87 million (GeorgeNotFound); 2.26 million (Not GeorgeNotFound); 1.25 million (GeorgeWasFound); 1.22 million (GeorgeNotFound Streams); 341,000 (GeorgeNotFound Shorts))
- Views: 684 million (main); 846.2 million (combined) (Note: Views, broken down by channel: 684.5 million (GeorgeNotFound); 73.6 million (Not GeorgeNotFound); 24.1 million (GeorgeWasFound); 54.6 million (GeorgeNotFound Streams); 2.4 million (GeorgeNotFound Shorts))
- Last updated: 21 September 2025
- Website: georgenotfound.shop

George Davidson (born 1 November 1996), better known online as GeorgeNotFound (abbreviated as GNF), is an English internet personality, Minecraft YouTuber, and Twitch streamer. He gained substantial popularity in 2020 and 2021 through uploading Minecraft content. Alongside content creator and frequent collaborator Dream, Davidson founded the Dream SMP, a Minecraft role-playing server consisting of multiple storylines and characters. As of July 2023, Davidson's five YouTube channels have all collectively reached over 15.2 million subscribers and over 742.1 million views.

== Career ==
=== YouTube ===
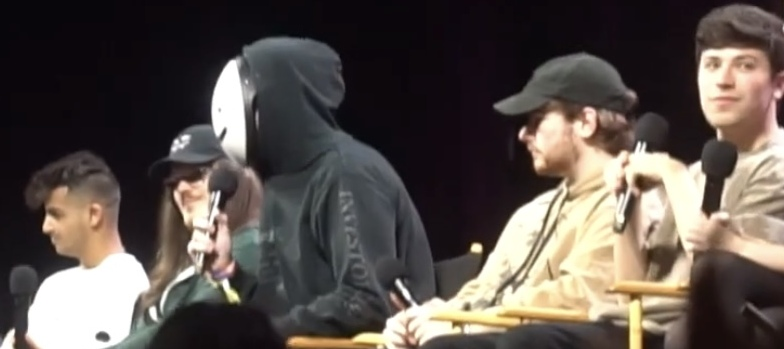
The Dream Team Panel at VidCon 2023. Left to right: Skeppy, BadBoyHalo, Dream, Sapnap, GeorgeNotFound

Davidson first started YouTube in 2013 under the name GeorgeeeHDPlays before uploading frequently in 2019, later rebranding himself under his current branding GeorgeNotFound. As of October 2022, his main YouTube channel has 10.5 million subscribers. Davidson's content mainly consists of him playing the video game Minecraft, with such content as gameplay videos and challenges. He regularly participates in MC Championship (MCC) tournaments with other Minecraft content creators.

He also regularly collaborates with fellow content creators such as Dream and Sapnap. Davidson met the YouTuber Dream when they both worked as software engineers, and they began to create various Minecraft videos together. Davidson was the first "hunter" in Dream's Minecraft Manhunt series and has been featured in every episode of the series since.

In 2020, Davidson released a video where Dream challenged him to play Minecraft while wearing a shock collar around his arm, which would painfully shock Davidson if he took damage in the game. On 9 September 2020, he released his most successful video to date, "Minecraft, But I'm Not Colorblind [sic] Anymore..." in which Davidson, who suffers from Protanopia, uses colour correcting glasses for the first time; the video has over 44 million views as of 2023.

Also in 2020, Davidson formed the Dream SMP Minecraft server with Dream, a role-playing server incorporating various storylines and character arcs featuring other online Minecraft personalities. The popularity of the server spawned fanfiction of several of its users, including Davidson and Dream, who were often written as romantic partners in a ship that is name blended as "DreamNotFound" (shortened to "DNF"). One such work, Heat Waves, garnered media attention since its initial release on the fanfiction repository Archive of Our Own in October 2020. Its virality contributed to the worldwide success of the titular song "Heat Waves" by English band Glass Animals.

Davidson was listed by YouTube as one of their top breakout creators of 2020. In 2021, he was listed among the ten most discussed gaming creators on Twitter.

=== Twitch ===
Davidson created his main Twitch account on 26 November 2019 under the name "GeorgeNotFound". As of October 2022, George's main account stands at 4.9 million followers, making him the 36th most followed Twitch streamer. On 24 February 2021, George created a second account, ThisIsNotGeorgeNotFound, which holds 1.4 million followers as of October 2022.

On 13 March 2021, Davidson received an indefinite ban on ThisIsNotGeorgeNotFound. According to the streaming site, the reasoning behind the ban was due to "using an inappropriate username". Davidson appealed the first ban only to receive a second ban one day later, in which Twitch sent an extended explanation that his account's username fell under "harassment via bullying". The account was unbanned one day later.

On 2 June 2021, Davidson streamed "Epic Hot Tub Stream" on his main account, which was recorded to be the highest viewed "hot tub stream" on Twitch. With almost 400,000 concurrent viewers, the stream broke the previous record of 100,000 viewers held by Pokimane and OfflineTV. He also achieved a Guinness World Record for the highest concurrent viewers for a cooking stream during his 20 March 2021 stream "Big Cooking Stream", reaching a peak of 319,846 viewers.

In 2021, Davidson received a nomination in the "Livestreamer" category at the 11th Streamy Awards.

=== Other ventures ===
Davidson joined fellow internet personalities Karl Jacobs and Sapnap as the third cohost of the podcast Banter. The first episode of the podcast featuring Davidson, "GeorgeNotFound Joins BANTER", was published on 4 August 2022.

== Personal life ==
George Davidson was born on 1 November 1996 in London, England. Davidson has protan red–green colour blindness.

On 18 September 2022, Davidson tweeted that his application for a U.S. visa was accepted. As of October 2022, he lives with Dream and Sapnap in Orlando, Florida. The move was chronicled in his video "I Met Dream In Real Life", published to YouTube on 3 October 2022.

== Awards and nominations ==
List of awards and nominations for GeorgeNotFound
Year	Award	Category	Result	Ref.
2021	Streamy Awards	Livestreamer	Nominated	

== Filmography ==
=== Music videos ===
List of music video appearances
Year	Title	Artist(s)	Role	Ref.
2021	"Taunt"	Lovejoy	Himself	
2023	"Until I End Up Dead"	Dream	Extra	
2023	"Everest"	Dream	Extra	

== See also ==
- Dream SMP
- List of YouTubers
- List of most-followed Twitch channels
