= Dream (YouTuber) =

American YouTuber and Twitch streamer (born 1999)

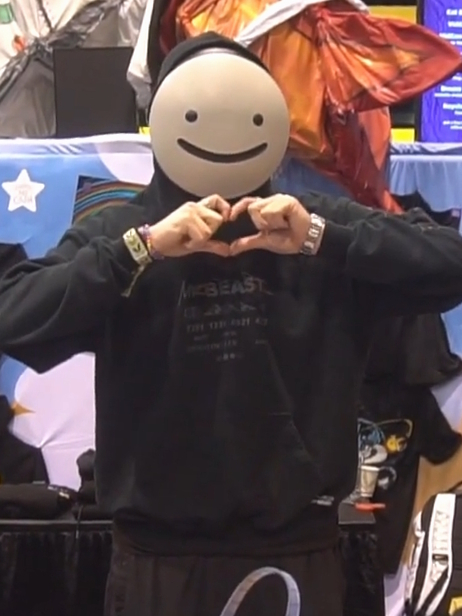
- Dream at VidCon 2023
- Born: August 12, 1999 (age 27)
- Other names: DreamWasTaken; DreamTraps; DreamXD
- Occupations: YouTuber; Twitch streamer
- Years active: 2014–present

Twitch information
- Channel: Dream
- Genre: Gaming
- Games: Minecraft; GeoGuessr
- Followers: 6.86 million (Note: Followers, broken down by channel: 6 million (Dream); 860 thousand (dreamwastaken))

YouTube information
- Channels: Dream; DreamXD; Dream Team Gaming
- Genre: Gaming
- Subscribers: 44.84 million (Note: Subscribers, broken down by channel: 34.8 million (Dream); 4.15 million (DreamXD); 2.18 million (Dream Team Gaming); 1.77 million (Dream Shorts); 1.62 million (Dream Music); 788 thousand (Dream Productions); 321 thousand (Dream Tech))
- Views: 5.3 billion (Note: Views, broken down by channel: 4.49 billion (Dream); 403.599 million (DreamXD); 243.03 million (Dream Shorts); 118.668 million (Dream Music); 37.264 million (Dream Team Gaming); 4.84 million (Dream Tech); 2.40 million (Dream Productions))
- Musical career
- Genre: Pop
- Occupations: Musician; songwriter
- Instrument: Vocals
- Years active: 2021–present
- Labels: Dream; Mercury; Republic
- Last updated: November 3, 2026

Clay (born August 12, 1999), better known online as Dream, is an American YouTuber and Internet personality primarily creating Minecraft content.

Dream has been active online since 2014, but did not gain substantial popularity until 2019, with the release of his Minecraft Manhunt series. Dream also attracted attention for his Minecraft speedruns; however, several of his records were overturned due to evidence of cheating. Dream ran the Dream SMP, an invite-only survival multiplayer (SMP) Minecraft server that stars content creators engaged in roleplay. It also attracted considerable attention, acclaim and a popular fandom.

== Entertainment career ==
=== 2014–2019: Early beginnings and Minecraft ===
Dream created his YouTube channel on February 8, 2014, under the username DreamTraps and started to upload content regularly in July 2019. The oldest accessible video on Dream's account involves him playing Minecraft deliberately poorly in order to "trigger" viewers. As of April 2025, the video amassed 19 million views.

In July 2019, Dream used reverse engineering techniques he learned from online forums to figure out the seed of a Minecraft world YouTuber PewDiePie was playing on. In November 2019, Dream uploaded a video titled "Minecraft, But Item Drops Are Random And Multiplied..." that amassed 59 million views as of April 2025. In January 2020, Dream uploaded a video in which he and another YouTuber, GeorgeNotFound, connected an Arduino board to an electric dog collar. It emitted an electric shock whenever a player lost health in Minecraft.

In December 2020, in place of their annual YouTube Rewind series, YouTube released a list of their top-trending videos and creators. On the U.S. list, YouTube ranked Dream's "Minecraft Speedrunner VS 3 Hunters GRAND FINALE" video as the number seven "Top Trending Video". They also ranked him as the number two "Top Creator" and number one "Breakout Creator". A Polygon article that month stated that "2020 has been a tremendous year for Dream", describing him as "YouTube's biggest gaming channel of the moment." A YouTube livestream by Dream in November 2020, with about 700,000 peak viewers, became the 6th most-viewed gaming stream in January 2021.

In a January 2021 article, Steven Asarch of Business Insider attributed Dream's growth during 2019 and 2020 "to his understanding of the YouTube algorithm", noting that "[h]e puts his keywords in the right places, capitalizes on trends, and makes thumbnails that fans want to click on."

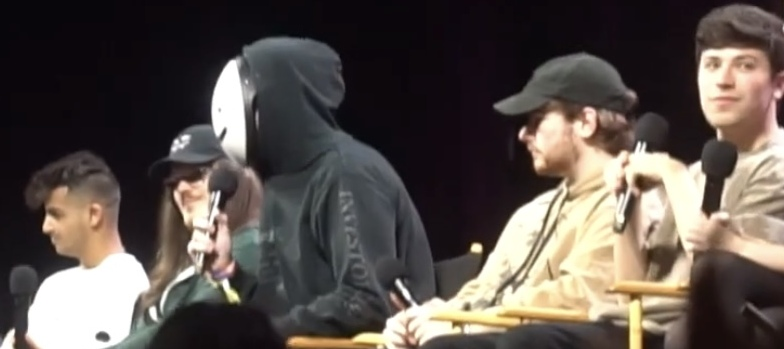
The Dream Team Panel at VidCon 2023. Left to right: Skeppy, BadBoyHalo, Dream, Sapnap, and GeorgeNotFound

Dream is a member of the "Dream Team", along with fellow YouTubers Sapnap and GeorgeNotFound. The group frequently collaborated to create new content. Dream also had a friendly rivalry with fellow Minecraft YouTuber Technoblade before Technoblade's death, as they each contested recognition for the title of "best Minecraft player."

=== 2019–present: Minecraft Manhunt, Dream SMP and collaborations ===
Dream's most popular YouTube series is "Minecraft Manhunt", a format where one player — usually Dream — attempts to complete a speedrun of Minecraft, while another player or team of players (the "hunters") attempts to kill the runner or thwart their progress. The first video in the series, titled "Beating Minecraft But My Friend Tries to Stop Me", was published on December 26, 2019. Further videos were published in the following years, featuring incrementally greater numbers of hunters. The final episode of the series was published on February 26, 2022. Many of the Minecraft Manhunt videos received tens of millions of views, with one of them ranking sixth in YouTube's Top Trending Videos of 2020. As of April 2025, the most-viewed video in Dream's Minecraft Manhunt series has 135 million views.

The series has received positive acclaim. Urian B. wrote in Tech Times that Minecraft Manhunt "requires not only mastery of the terrain but also the ability to think fast on your feet while different choices present themselves with only milliseconds of time for decision making. This is something that Dream is good at, split second decision making." Nicolas Perez from Paste described Minecraft Manhunt as "an experience that leaves me slack-jawed every time", stating that the format of Minecraft Manhunt "seems to guarantee the hunters come out on top. But more often than not, Dream pulls just enough aces out of his sleeve to narrowly beat the hunters, and eventually the game." Gonzalo Cardona, writing for Ginx TV, noted that Minecraft Manhunt had "inspired cult-like montages by fans." Nathan Grayson of Kotaku said that Minecraft Manhunt had turned Dream "into a household name among Minecraft fans."

In April 2020, shortly after the release of Minecraft snapshot 20w17a, Dream and GeorgeNotFound created the Dream SMP, a private Survival Multiplayer (SMP) Minecraft server. Over time, other prominent Minecraft content creators outside the "Dream Team" were invited to the server, including TommyInnit, Technoblade, and Wilbur Soot.

Throughout 2020, Dream was a prominent participant in MC Championship, a monthly Minecraft competition organized by Noxcrew. He won both the 8th and 11th MC Championships. In September 2020, during the 10th MC Championship, he played for charity purposes and raised around $3,400.

The primary attraction for fans of The Dream SMP, according to their feedback, is the roleplay aspect. Major events are loosely scripted in advance, while most other elements consist of improvisation, performed live on YouTube and Twitch. Cecilia D'Anastasio of Wired described the Dream SMP as a form of live theatre and "Machiavellian political drama." During January 2021, over 1 million people tuned into Dream SMP livestreams.

On April 26, 2021, as a collaboration with Dream, fellow YouTuber MrBeast's fast-food restaurant chain MrBeast Burger released the Dream Burger as a limited-time menu addition.

On November 4, 2025, Dream released a video on his main channel in which he revealed that a break to his scaphoid bone that he had sustained six months earlier while helping fellow YouTuber Sapnap train for an upcoming boxing match was struggling to heal and that it might affect his ability to upload his usual skill-intensive Minecraft challenge videos in the future. Dream still remained in a cast at the time of upload and he had undergone surgery and a bone graft to try and help heal his scaphoid. Dream also revealed that his recent uploads were videos he had pre-recorded before his surgery and that during filming them, his injury had already begun to affect his gaming ability.

== Music career ==
On February 4, 2021, Dream released his first song, entitled "Roadtrip", in collaboration with PmBata, which garnered over 25 million views on YouTube. On May 20, 2021, Dream released his second song, entitled "Mask", which garnered over 24.7 million views on YouTube. An animated music video for "Mask" was released in June of the same year, though it was later deleted. The song and accompanying music video faced criticism for the content of the lyrics and animation, including a negative portrayal of prescription drugs. He depicted his own negative experience taking prescribed ADHD pills, referring to them in the work as "normal pills". On August 19, 2021, Dream released his third song, entitled "Change My Clothes", in collaboration with American singer-songwriter Alec Benjamin, which garnered over 8.3 million views on YouTube.

Dream's fourth song, titled "Until I End Up Dead", was released through Mercury and Republic Records on June 23, 2023, after he had signed with Republic in December 2022. It was his first song to be released through a major label. On July 26, 2023, Dream announced that his debut EP To Whoever Wants to Hear, with seven tracks, would be released on September 1, 2023. The second single from that EP, "Everest" with Yung Gravy, was released on July 28, 2023, followed by its music video on August 9, 2023. A music video for "Kind of Love", the second track on To Whoever Wants to Hear, was released on August 31, 2023, the day before the EP's release. The EP debuted at number 173 on the Billboard 200 chart. He released "Adrenaline" on February 6, 2026, with a music video the following day.

== Public image and controversies ==
Dream's personality on YouTube has been described as "polarizing". A 2020 SurveyMonkey poll revealed that, of respondents who were familiar with Dream, 59.7% held a favorable view of him, while 22.1% expressed an unfavorable view. Dream and other members of the Dream SMP gave rise to a popular fandom.

In June 2021, Dream received scrutiny for announcing that all revenue generated by his streams in June would go to charity, with critics claiming he did not stream for more than a single day that month on his main account, while streaming on an alt account. On June 30, 2021, Dream announced that he had donated US$140,000 (US$90,000 from fan contributions and US$50,000 from the Dream Team) to The Trevor Project, an LGBTQ youth charity.

In response to fellow YouTuber Technoblade's cancer diagnosis, Dream donated US$21,409 to cancer research in late August 2021. Dream has since participated in many other cancer charity initiatives, organized with Technoblade's father, known online as Mr. Technodad.

During his career, the Federal Bureau of Investigation (FBI) contacted him about a "threat made against his life".

He is the subject of Heat Waves, a fan fiction imagining a romantic relationship between him and GeorgeNotFound.

From December 2024 to January 2025, Dream had a public falling out over social media with TommyInnit, which later extended to include fellow Dream SMP collaborators Tubbo and Jack Manifold.

=== Speedrun cheating scandal ===
In early October 2020, Dream livestreamed himself speedrunning Minecraft, and submitted one of his times to speedrun.com. He was awarded with 5th place at the time in the "1.16+ random seed glitchless" category. Accusations of Dream cheating in these speedruns first arose on October 16, when another Minecraft speedrunner, in now-deleted Twitter posts, reported seeing higher drop rates for key items in one of the speedrunning attempts that Dream submitted. Dream responded on October 29 in now-deleted Twitter posts, arguing that he had no reason to cheat, that he did not possess the coding knowledge to raise drop rates, and that the data was cherry picked.

On December 11, 2020, following a two-month investigation, speedrun.com's Minecraft verification team removed his submission from the leaderboards. The team published a report, along with a 14-minute video to YouTube, analyzing six archived livestreams of speedrunning sessions by Dream from around the time of the record. The team concluded that the game had been modified to make the chance of obtaining certain items needed to complete the game higher than normal; they argued the odds that "anyone in the Minecraft speedrunning community would ever get luck comparable to Dream's" was at most 1 in 7.5 trillion. In response, Dream called the investigation clickbait and claimed that it was flawed enough that some members of speedrun.com's moderation team threatened to quit over it. Speedrun.com moderator Geosquare denied the accusation, saying: "All moderators voted unanimously in our decision and no one is threatening to leave in protest", and "From everything we know[,] that [claim] is unsubstantiated or complete hyperbole."

In a YouTube video, Dream maintained that the accusations of his cheating were untrue. In response to the report by speedrun.com, Dream commissioned a report by an anonymous statistician, who Dream said was an astrophysicist. They argued that the odds of a Minecraft speedrunner seeing luck comparable to Dream's was 1 in 10 million, instead of the speedrun.com team's 1 in 7.5 trillion. (Note: The "1 in 7.5 trillion" figure was reported as the odds of encountering the exact outcomes if one were to replicate the run, whereas the "1 in 10 million" figure refers to the odds that any of the large number of active speedrunners might experience a situation of comparably low likelihood within a certain timeframe.) Dot Esports said that the report did not exonerate him, and "at most" it suggested it was not impossible that he was lucky. The moderation team stood by their ruling and issued a rebuttal to Dream's report. In a Twitter post, Dream indicated that he would accept their decision without admitting fault. On February 4, 2021, Matt Parker, a YouTube personality and recreational mathematician, published a 40-minute video on the controversy supporting the conclusions of the moderators, estimating the actual odds of being 1 in 20 sextillion (2 × 10^{22}).

On May 30, 2021, in a written statement, Dream stated that he had in fact been using a "disallowed modification" that altered item drop probabilities, although he maintained that the addition of the modification was unintentional. According to him, this discrepancy was a result of a change to a client mod written for his YouTube channel. In his statement, he said that the item modifications were changed by the developer of the mod, and said that he was unaware of the addition until February 2021. After becoming aware of the addition, he deleted his video response to the speedrun.com moderators. Dream explained that he did not mention his discovery of the addition publicly back then because he "felt like the community had been through enough drama and that it was pointless." He also "didn't want to be the center of controversy for the hundredth time" and he figured "it would be a story I would tell in a few years when no one really cared."

In a 2021 interview with YouTuber Anthony Padilla, Dream said that he regretted his initial reaction to the cheating scandal, saying that "I handled the situation horribly. When it originally came out, my response was, 'You guys are idiots, blah blah blah.'" When asked by Padilla how he thought he should have handled the scandal, Dream said that "I should have shut off all my devices for a couple days and been like, 'OK, let me not react with emotion.'"

=== Anonymity and face reveal ===
According to Time magazine, "Dream's anonymity has been one of the most alluring aspects of his persona online and that intrigue, paired with his vibrant personality, have helped him build a loyal following across social media platforms." In a 2021 interview with YouTuber Anthony Padilla, Dream explained that he never intended to remain anonymous, though this aspect of his identity became too important online for him to abandon at that time.

On January 1, 2021, Dream was doxed when an image he had posted of his kitchen was used to locate his address. In a tweet on January 7, 2021, he addressed the doxing and denied accusations made against him by his ex-girlfriend.

On September 19, 2022, Dream stated that his next YouTube video would be him revealing his face to the public for the first time. He revealed his face in said YouTube video, titled hi, I'm Dream., thirteen days later, on October 2, 2022. Dream's motivation behind his face reveal is his desire to meet with friends, explore new types of content, and do more work outside his home. He also said that he would post "more IRL content" but does not "plan on adding a face cam" to his Minecraft videos. Dream's face reveal prompted both positive and negative comments online. His face reveal video garnered over 21.9 million views and 2.5 million likes in less than a day. As of May 2026, the video has over 73 million views and over 4.7 million likes, making it the 12th-most-viewed video on Dream's YouTube channel. Due to backlash, Dream privated the face reveal video in June 2023. Dream eventually re-published this face reveal video.

== Personal life ==
Dream's real-life identity, and many aspects of his personal life, are not public. He is American, named Clay, born August 12, 1999. Dream publicly discussed his ADHD diagnosis in June 2021. As of 2022, he resides in Orlando, Florida, with fellow internet personalities GeorgeNotFound and Sapnap. His anonymous avatar is inspired by a picture his former girlfriend posted on Discord.

== Discography ==
Dream discography
- EPs: 1
- Singles: 5
- Music videos: 4

=== Extended plays ===
List of EPs with selected details
Title	Details	Peak chart positions
Title	Details	US
To Whoever Wants to Hear	Released: September 1, 2023; Label: Mercury, Republic	173

=== Singles ===
List of singles as lead artist, with selected chart positions
Title	Year	Peak chart positions						Album
Title	Year	CAN	HUN	IRE	NZ Hot	SWE Heat.	UK	Album
"Roadtrip" (with PmBata)	2021	87	—	70	—	—	75	
"Mask"	2021	96	37	43	—	—	38	
"Change My Clothes" (with Alec Benjamin)	2021	—	31	70	—	13	67	
"Until I End Up Dead"	2023	—	—	—	34	—	—	To Whoever Wants to Hear
"Everest" (with Yung Gravy)	2023	—	—	—	37	—		To Whoever Wants to Hear
"Adrenaline" (with PmBata)	2026	—	—	—	—	—	—	Non-album singles
"—" denotes a recording that did not chart or was not released in that territory.

=== Music videos ===
List of music videos
Title	Year	Director(s)	Album	Ref.
"Mask" (Note: The music video for "Mask" was privated.)	2021	Xoriak	Non-album single	
"Until I End Up Dead"	2023	Ethan Frank, Neema Sadeghi & Dream	To Whoever Wants to Hear	
"Everest" (with Yung Gravy)	2023	Kevin Aguirre	To Whoever Wants to Hear	
"Kind of Love"	2023	—	To Whoever Wants to Hear	
"Adrenaline" (with PmBata)	2026	DizzyTJ	Non-album single	

== Awards and nominations ==
Year	Award	Category	Result	Ref.
2020	Streamy Awards	Gaming	Won	
2020	Streamy Awards	Breakout Creator	Nominated	
2021	Streamy Awards	Gaming	Won	
2021	Streamy Awards	Creator of the Year	Nominated	
2021	The Game Awards	Content Creator of the Year	Won	
2022	Streamy Awards	Creator of the Year	Nominated	
2022	Streamy Awards	Gamer	Nominated	
2023	Streamy Awards	Gamer	Won	

Publication	Year	World record	R. Status	Ref.
Guinness World Records	2022	Most subscribers for a dedicated Minecraft channel on YouTube	Record	
Guinness World Records	2022	Most viewed Minecraft gameplay video on YouTube	Record	

== Filmography ==
=== Music video ===
Year	Title	Artist(s)	Role	Ref.
2023	"Until I End Up Dead"	Himself	Himself	
2023	"Everest"	Himself & Yung Gravy	Himself	
2023	"Kind of Love"	Himself	Himself	

== See also ==
- List of YouTubers
- List of most-followed Twitch channels
