= Egocentric vision =

Type of computer vision for wearable cameras

Egocentric vision or first-person vision is a sub-field of computer vision that entails analyzing images and videos captured by a wearable camera, which is typically worn on the head or on the chest and naturally approximates the visual field of the camera wearer. Consequently, visual data capture the part of the scene on which the user focuses to carry out the task at hand and offer a valuable perspective to understand the user's activities and their context in a naturalistic setting.

The wearable camera looking forwards is often supplemented with a camera looking inward at the user's eye and able to measure a user's eye gaze, which is useful to reveal attention and to better understand the user's activity and intentions.

== History ==
The idea of using a wearable camera to gather visual data from a first-person perspective dates back to the 70s, when Steve Mann invented "Digital Eye Glass", a device that, when worn, causes the human eye itself to effectively become both an electronic camera and a television display.

Subsequently, wearable cameras were used for health-related applications in the context of Humanistic Intelligence and Wearable AI. Egocentric vision is best done from the point-of-eye, but may also be done by way of a neck-worn camera when eyeglasses would be in-the-way. This neck-worn variant was popularized by way of the Microsoft SenseCam in 2006 for experimental health research works. The interest of the computer vision community into the egocentric paradigm has been arising slowly entering the 2010s and it is rapidly growing in recent years, boosted by both the impressive advances in the field of wearable technology and by the increasing number of potential applications.

The prototypical first-person vision system described by Kanade and Hebert, in 2012 is composed by three basic components: a localization component able to estimate the surrounding, a recognition component able to identify object and people, and an activity recognition component, able to provide information about the current activity of the user. Together, these three components provide a complete situational awareness of the user, which in turn can be used to provide assistance to the user or to the caregiver. Following this idea, the first computational techniques for egocentric analysis focused on hand-related activity recognition and social interaction analysis. Also, given the unconstrained nature of the video and the huge amount of data generated, temporal segmentation and summarization were among the first problems addressed. After almost ten years of egocentric vision (2007–2017), the field is still undergoing diversification. Emerging research topics include:

- Social saliency estimation
- Multi-agent egocentric vision systems
- Privacy preserving techniques and applications
- Attention-based activity analysis
- Social interaction analysis
- Hand pose analysis
- Ego graphical User Interfaces (EUI)
- Understanding social dynamics and attention
- Revisiting robotic vision and machine vision as egocentric sensing
- Activity forecasting
- Gaze prediction

== Technical challenges ==
Egomotion estimation

Wearable cameras are small and lightweight digital recording devices that capture images and video from a first-person perspective. Depending on the device, recording may be automatic, and resolution and frame rate may vary.

Depending on the frame rate, it is common to distinguish between photo-cameras (also called lifelogging cameras) and video-cameras.

- The former (e.g., Narrative Clip and Microsoft SenseCam), are commonly worn on the chest, and are characterized by a very low frame rate (up to 2fpm) that allows to capture images over a long period of time without the need of recharging the battery. Consequently, they offer considerable potential for inferring knowledge about e.g. behaviour patterns, habits or lifestyle of the user. However, due to the low frame-rate and the free motion of the camera, temporally adjacent images typically present abrupt appearance changes so that motion features cannot be reliably estimated.
- The latter (e.g., Google Glass, GoPro), are commonly mounted on the head, and capture conventional video (around 35fps) that allows to capture fine temporal details of interactions. Consequently, they offer potential for in-depth analysis of daily or special activities. However, since the camera is moving with the wearer head, it becomes more difficult to estimate the global motion of the wearer and in the case of abrupt movements, the images can result blurred.

In both cases, since the camera is worn in a naturalistic setting, visual data present a huge variability in terms of illumination conditions and object appearance. Moreover, the camera wearer is not visible in the image and what he/she is doing has to be inferred from the information in the visual field of the camera, implying that important information about the wearer, such for instance as pose or facial expression estimation, is not available.

== Applications ==
A collection of studies published in a special theme issue of the American Journal of Preventive Medicine has demonstrated the potential of lifelogs captured through wearable cameras from a number of viewpoints. In particular, it has been shown that used as a tool for understanding and tracking lifestyle behaviour, lifelogs would enable the prevention of noncommunicable diseases associated to unhealthy trends and risky profiles (such as obesity and depression). In addition, used as a tool of re-memory cognitive training, lifelogs would enable the prevention of cognitive and functional decline in elderly people.

More recently, egocentric cameras have been used to study human and animal cognition, human-human social interaction, human-robot interaction, human expertise in complex tasks. Other applications include navigation/assistive technologies for the blind, monitoring and assistance of industrial workflows, and augmented reality interfaces.

== See also ==
- Eye tracking
- Lifelog
- Quantified self
- Smartglasses
- Sousveillance
