= Lifelog =

Personal record of one's daily life

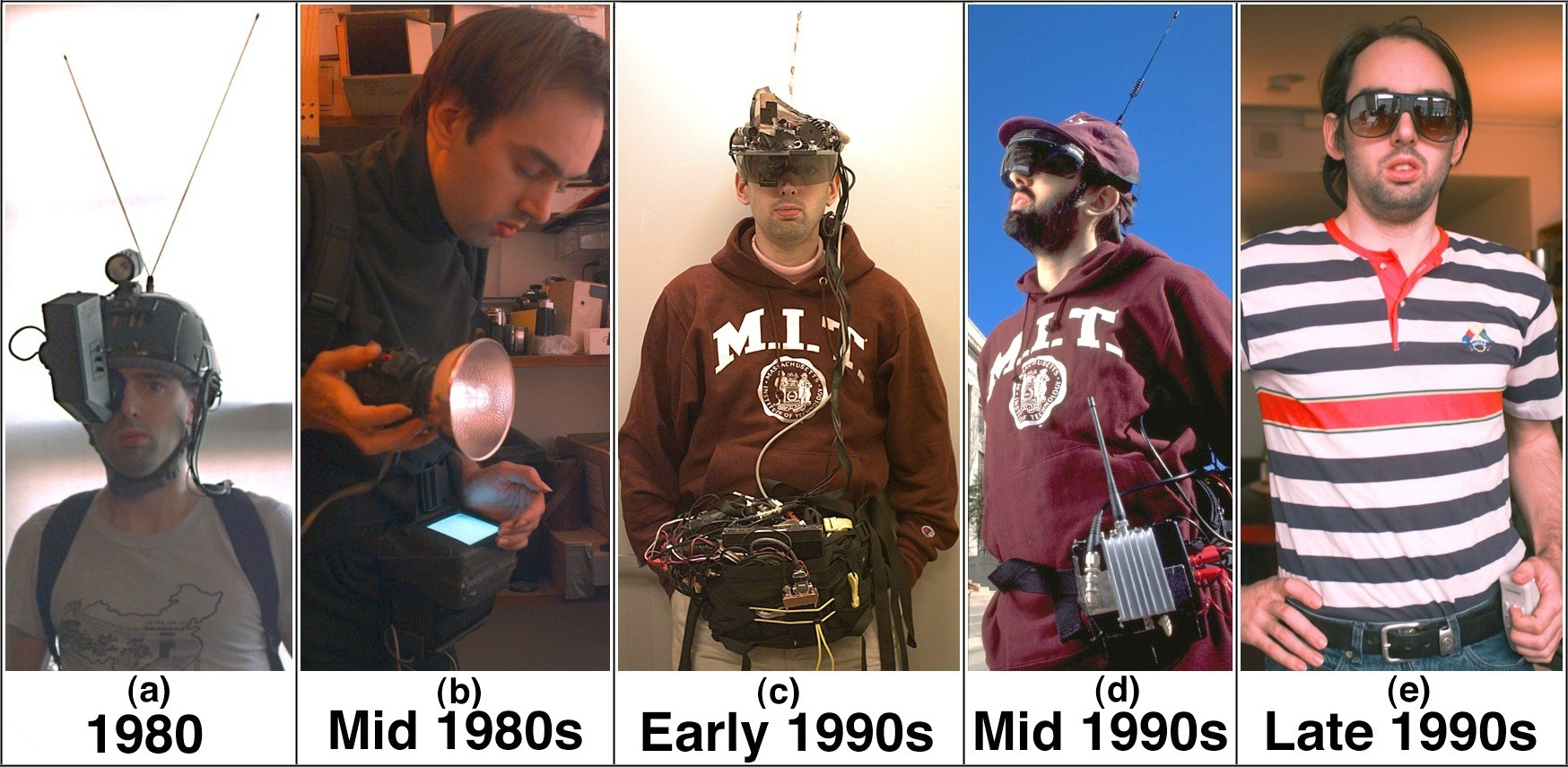
Evolution of lifelogging apparatus, including the wearable computer, camera, and viewfinder with wireless Internet connection. Early apparatus used separate transmitting and receiving antennas. Later apparatus evolved toward the appearance of ordinary eyeglasses in the late 1980s and early 1990s.

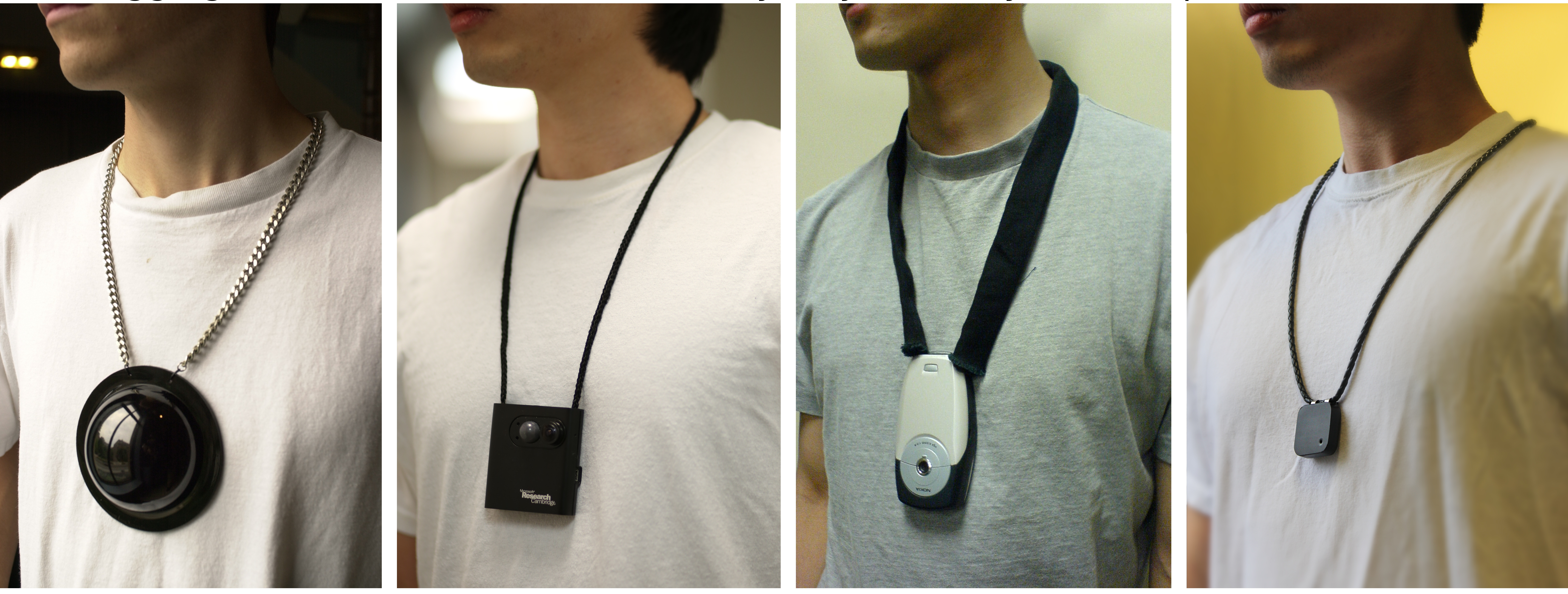
Evolution of the lifelogging lanyard camera. From left to right: Mann (1998); Microsoft (2004); Mann, Fung, Lo (2006); Memoto (2013)

A lifelog is a personal record of one's daily life in a varying amount of detail, for a variety of purposes. The record contains a comprehensive dataset of a human's activities. The data could be used to increase knowledge about how people live their lives. In recent years, some lifelog data has been automatically captured by wearable technology or mobile devices. People who keep lifelogs about themselves are known as lifeloggers (or sometimes lifebloggers or lifegloggers).

The sub-field of computer vision that processes and analyses visual data captured by a wearable camera is called "egocentric vision" or egography.

== Examples ==
A known lifelogger was Robert Shields, who manually recorded 25 years of his life from 1972 to 1997, at 5-minute intervals. This record resulted in a 37-million word diary, thought to be the longest ever written.

Steve Mann was the first person to capture continuous physiological data along with a live first-person video from a wearable camera. Starting in 1994, Mann continuously transmitted his life — 24 hours a day, 7 days a week. Using a wearable camera and wearable display, he invited others to see what he was looking at, as well as to send him live feeds or messages in real-time. In 1998 Mann started a community of lifeloggers (also known as lifebloggers or lifegloggers) which has grown to more than 20,000 members. Throughout the 1990s Mann presented this work to the U.S. Army, with two visits to US Natick Army Research Labs.

In 1996, Jennifer Ringley started JenniCam, broadcasting photographs from a webcam in her college bedroom every fifteen seconds; the site was turned off in 2003.

"We Live In Public" was a 24/7 Internet conceptual art experiment created by Josh Harris in December 1999. With a format similar to TV's Big Brother, Harris placed tapped telephones, microphones and 32 robotic cameras in the home he shared with his girlfriend, Tanya Corrin. Viewers talked to Harris and Corrin in the site's chatroom. Harris recently launched the online live video platform, Operator 11.

In 2001, Kiyoharu Aizawa discussed the problem of how to handle a huge amount of videos continuously captured in one's life and presented an automatic summarization.

The lifelog DotComGuy ran throughout 2000, when Mitch Maddox lived the entire year without leaving his house. After Joi Ito's discussion of Moblogging, which involves web publishing from a mobile device, came Gordon Bell's MyLifeBits (2004), an experiment in digital storage of a person's lifetime, including full-text search, text/audio annotations, and hyperlinks.

In 2003, a project called LifeLog was started at the Defense Advanced Research Projects Agency (DARPA), under the supervision of Douglas Gage. This project would combine several technologies to record life activities, in order to create a life diary. Shortly after, the notion of lifelogging was identified as a technology and cultural practice that could be exploited by governments, businesses or militaries through surveillance. The DARPA lifelogging project was cancelled by 2004, but this project helped to popularize the idea, and the usage of the term lifelogging in everyday discourse. It contributed to the growing acceptance of using technology for augmented memory.

In 2003, Kiyoharu Aizawa introduced a context-based video retrieval system that was designed to handle data continuously captured from various sources, including a wearable camera, a microphone, and multiple sensors such as a GPS receiver, an acceleration sensor, a gyro sensor, and a brain-wave analyzer. By extracting contextual information from these inputs, the system can retrieve specific scenes captured by the wearable camera.

In 2004, conceptual media artist Alberto Frigo began tracking everything his right hand (his dominant hand) had used, then began adding different tracking and documentation projects. His tracking was done manually rather than using technology.

In 2004 Arin Crumley and Susan Buice met online and began a relationship. They decided to forgo verbal communication during the initial courtship and instead spoke to each other via written notes, sketches, video clips, and Myspace. They went on to create an autobiographical film about their experience, called Four Eyed Monsters. It was part-documentary, part-narrative, with a few scripted elements added. They went on to produce a two-season podcast about the making of the film to promote it.

In 2007 Justin Kan began streaming continuous live video and audio from a webcam attached to a cap, beginning at midnight on March 19, 2007. He created a website, Justin.tv, for the purpose. He described this procedure as "lifecasting".

In recent years, with the advent of smartphones and similar devices, lifelogging became much more accessible. For instance, UbiqLog and Experience Explorer employ mobile sensing to perform life logging, while other lifelogging devices, like the Autographer, use a combination of visual sensors and GPS tracking to simultaneously document one's location and what one can see. Lifelogging was popularized by the mobile app Foursquare, which had users "check in" as a way of sharing and saving their location; this later evolved into the popular lifelogging app, Swarm.

== Life caching ==
Life caching refers to the social act of storing and sharing one's entire life events in an open and public forum such as Facebook. Modern life caching is considered a form of social networking and typically takes place on the internet. The term was introduced in 2005 by trendwatching.com, in a report predicting this would soon be a trend, given the availability of relevant technology. However, life log information is privacy-sensitive, and therefore sharing such information is associated with risks.

== Mobile and wearable apps ==
To assist in their efforts of tracking, some lifeloggers use mobile devices and apps. Utilizing the GPS and motion processors of digital devices enables lifelogging apps to easily record metadata related to daily activities. Myriad lifelogging apps are available in the App Store (iOS), Google Play and other app distribution platforms, but some commonly cited apps include: Instant, Reporter, Journey, Path, Moves, and HeyDay, insight for Wear (a smartwatch app).

Xperia also has a native mobile application which is called Lifelog. The app works standalone but gets enriched when used with Sony Smart Bands.

Swarm is a lifelogging app that motivates users to check-in, recording every place they've visited, while inspiring them to visit new places.

== See also ==
- Cathal Gurrin
- Diary
- Digital footprint
- Dymaxion Chronofile
- Egocentric vision
- Gordon Bell
- Lifecasting (video stream)
- Lifestreaming
- Microsoft SenseCam
- MyLifeBits
- Narrative Clip
- Personal knowledge base
- Quantified self
- Smartglasses
- Sousveillance
- Wearable computer

== Bibliography ==
- Kieron, O'Hara; Tuffield, Mischa M.; Shadbolt, Nigel (2009). "Lifelogging: Privacy and empowerment with memories for life" (PDF). Identity in the Information Society. 1 (1): 155. doi:10.1007/s12394-009-0008-4.
- Gurrin, Cathal; Smeaton, Alan; Doherty, Aiden (2014). "Lifelogging: Personal Big Data". Foundations and Trends in Information Retrieval. 8: 1–125. doi:10.1561/1500000033.
