= Lifestreaming =

Act of documenting and sharing aspects of one's daily experiences online

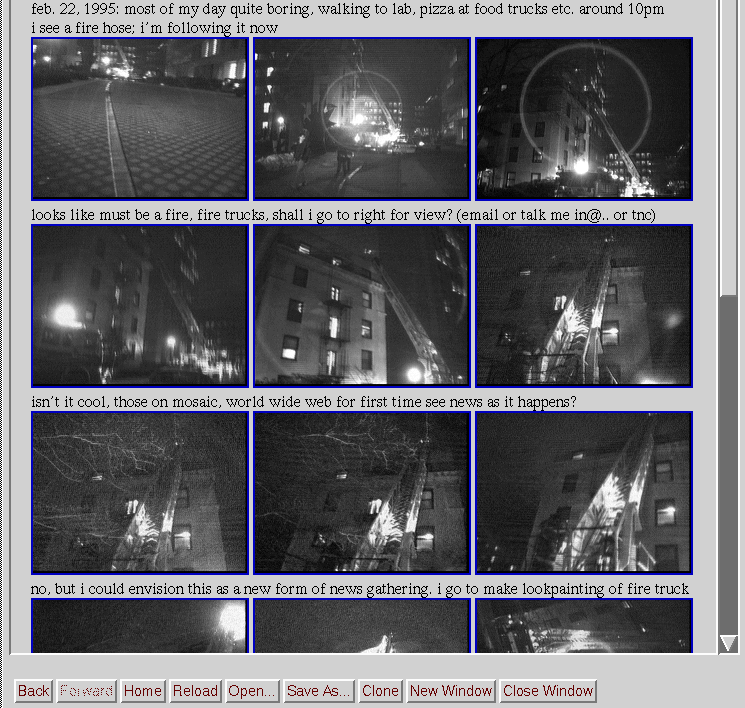
An early example of wireless text and image based Lifestreaming from a wearable computer (1995)

Lifestreaming is an act of documenting and sharing aspects of one's daily experiences online, via a lifestream website that publishes things of a person's choosing (e.g. photos, social media, videos).

== History ==
The term "lifestream" was coined by Eric Freeman and David Gelernter at Yale University in the mid-1990s to describe "...a time-ordered stream of documents that functions as a diary of your electronic life; every document you create and every document other people send you is stored in your lifestream. The tail of your stream contains documents from the past (starting with your electronic birth certificate). Moving away from the tail and toward the present, your stream contains more recent documents—papers in progress or new electronic mail; other documents (pictures, correspondence, bills, movies, voice mail, software) are stored in between. Moving beyond the present and into the future, the stream contains documents you will need: reminders, calendar items, to-do lists. The point of lifestreams isn't to shift from one software structure to another but to shift the whole premise of computerized information: to stop building glorified file cabinets and start building (simplified, abstract) artificial minds; and to store our electronic lives inside."

=== Before lifestreaming ===
The concept existed long before it was first introduced to the public. Globally known public figures like Leonardo da Vinci and Albert Einstein were collecting their stream of personal and professional data, an act that could be considered lifestreaming.

I like to think of a lifestreaming as today's digital equivalent of Leonardo da Vinci's notebooks [...] da Vinci's recorded notes, drawing, questions and more in his notebooks. Some of these were quite mundane (grocery lists and doodles), others were not. But their body of work was overtime, a view of a one individual's mind.

— Steve Rubel, Why Lifestream? To model Leonardo da Vinci diaries.

== On the Web ==
Social network aggregators adapted Freeman and Gelernter's original concept to address the vast flows of personal information and exchange created by social network services such as MySpace or Facebook ("web companies large and small are embracing this stream" of providing lifestreaming). Other online applications have emerged to facilitate a user's lifestream. Posterous offered a variety of unique features to enhance its basic blogging function. Tumblr is a similar concept, but with slightly different features.

=== Lifestream websites ===
Websites accommodating of lifestreaming gather together all the information someone wants to display and order it in reverse-chronology. "Each person designs her daily life to some extent-for instance basic time management tools. Putting one's life online might provide the critical perspective to help redesign it. It is not just an organizational tool, but a tool that allows critical evaluation, reassessment and tweaking daily choice"

However, there is a clear distinction between the act of lifestreaming as a simple form of editorial extension to one's activity stream, and the production of a well-designed lifestream which involves commitment and requires the technical skills necessary to create and maintaining its underlying site.

The increase in people keeping track of their lives digitally is considered by futurologists a step towards artificial intelligence.

The "publish then filter" is discussed at length and breadth in Here Comes Everybody: The Power of Organizing Without Organizations. The main focus is on the fact that you can publish anything, as it may be helpful to others.

== Benefits of lifestreaming ==
Social networking services allow people to keep in touch with their family or acquaintances while being away from them. The hard boundary between social and professional space is becoming thinner. Consequently, this provides a sense of belonging, security and companionship while being in the workplace with an employer.

=== Transparency and authenticity ===
The rapid accessibility of one's lifestreaming activity can provide important information and inspire readers.

=== Data mining ===
Lifestreams also represent a source of information about people's intents that can be mined. A common bridge between all concepts of lifestreaming is the gathering of statistical data. With computerized support that simplifies one's daily choices and activities, it can be much easier to identify certain common traits in one's behavior. Moreover, lifestreaming can keep track of budget, calories, physical activity or sleep cycles.

=== Social integration ===
According to work in Activity Theory, reading one's lifestream is an act of integration in the community. In an individual's mind, the needs and interests of other people are ideally seen. Consequently, his or her activity imitates a pattern and through this process an individual is integrated within the community. Lifestreaming has altered the dynamics of maintaining connections and facilitating a sense of community regardless of the geographical distance. This particular facet of lifestreaming serves as a valuable tool for constructing and nurturing online communities where individuals with shared interests can converge.

=== Monetization ===
Monetizing a lifestream was first introduced by author Tim Ferriss. In his books he presents instructions for designing a business that can self-develop, being convinced that one should live the life he wants the moment he wants instead of waiting for something to happen. With this belief, he proposes selling digital information products that can be automated and turned into profit.

== Lifecasting ==
Lifecasting is a continual live streaming of events in a person's life through digital media. Typically, lifecasting is transmitted through the medium of the Internet and can involve wearable technology. Lifecasting reverses the concept of surveillance, giving rise to sousveillance through portability, personal experience capture, daily routines and interactive communication with viewers.

Originally being called "lifelogging" or "lifestreaming," during the summer of 2007, Justin Kan's term lifecasting escalated into general usage and became the accepted label of the movement. Other labels for lifecasting and related have occasionally surfaced, including cyborglog, glog, lifeblog, lifeglob, livecasting and wearcam.

Lifecasting today looks a little different from the continuous stream first imagined by Mann. It has taken new forms today, such as Instagram and Snapchat, as it is the ways that modern lifecasters share their life experiences within the world of their social networks. Although it isn't a continuous stream, the motivations of "life sharing" remains the same.

=== Precursors ===
Jean-Luc Godard said, "Cinema is not a dream or a fantasy. It is life." In the pre-history of the lifecasting movement, the introduction of lightweight, portable cameras during the early 1960s, as used in the Cinéma vérité and Direct cinema movements, changed the nature of documentary filmmaking. Technological improvements in audio and the invention of smaller, less intrusive cameras brought about more naturalistic situations in documentary films by Robert Drew, Richard Leacock, the Maysles Brothers and others. While filmmakers such as Michel Auder, Jonas Mekas and Ed Pincus created cinematic diaries, the sculptor Claes Oldenburg, in the early 1960s, had theatrical showings of his home movies. Andy Warhol, who once said, "I like boring things," introduced the notion that life could be captured simply by aiming a fixed camera at subjects usually regarded as "boring" and later projecting the unedited footage. The documentary filmmaker Emile de Antonio observed that "with any cut at all, objectivity fades away."

A milestone came in 1973 on PBS when ten million PBS viewers followed the lives of the Loud family each week on An American Family, a documentary series often cited as the beginning of reality television. Six years later, the series was satirized by Albert Brooks in his first feature film, Real Life (1979).

Author William Gibson featured "God's Little Toy," a lifecasting mini-blimp, that followed subjects around—for their lives—in his 1999 novel All Tomorrow's Parties.

=== Lifecasters ===
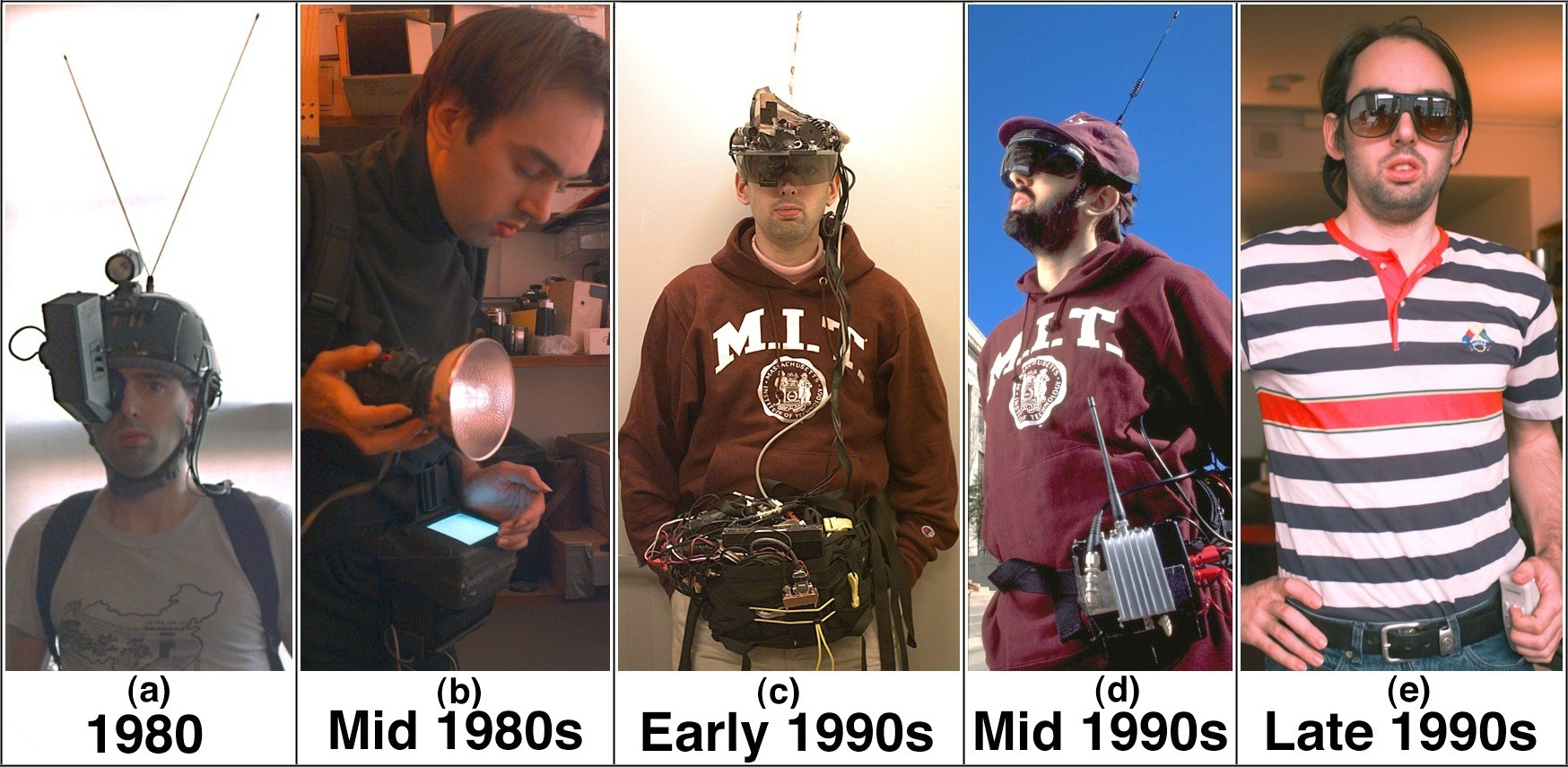
Evolution of lifecasting apparatus, including wearable computer, camera, and viewfinder with wireless Internet connection. Early apparatus used separate transmitting and receiving antennas. Later apparatus evolved toward the appearance of ordinary eyeglasses in the late 1980s and early 1990s.

The first person to do lifecasting, i.e. stream continuous live first-person video from a wearable camera, was Steve Mann whose experiments with wearable computing and streaming video in the early 1980s led to Wearable Wireless Webcam. Starting in 1994, Mann continuously transmitted his everyday life 24 hours a day, seven days a week, and his site grew in popularity to become Cool Site of the Day in 1995. Using a wearable camera and wearable display, he invited others to both see what he was looking at, over the Web, as well as send him live feeds or messages in real time. In 1998 Mann started a community of lifecasters which has grown to more than 20,000 members. In a recent article by Mann entitled "My 'Augmediated' Life," he compares the early developments of his technologies to that of Google Glass when discussing issues of augmented reality and the ways in which these wearable technologies mediate the user to the world.

Jennifer Ringley's JenniCam (1996–2004) attracted mass media attention, as noted by Cnet: "JenniCam, beginning in 1996, was the first really successful 'lifecasting' attempt." Ringley appeared on talk shows and magazines covers, and her pioneering effort was followed by collegeboyslive.tv and Brian Diva Cox' MagicsWebpage.tv (1998 - 2013). That same year, the streaming of live video from the University of Toronto became a social networking phenomenon.

ZAC ADAMS Started CollegeBoysLive (1998–present) which became the first 24/7 live reality site featuring a group of unrelated gay guys living in a house together with over 56 streaming cameras and audio. Collegeboyslive chose 6 random people to live in the house and have their entire lives broadcast 24/7 for 6 months where viewers can watch and listen to them as they lived their lives. Collegeboyslive.com is currently the only live webcam house still up and operating today. CollegeBoysLive was also the first website to have a movie made about one of the groups from arrival to departure. Edited by George O'Donnell the movie takes you into the life of the boys who live in such a public place

"We Live In Public" was a 24/7 Internet conceptual art experiment created by Josh Harris in December 1999. With a format similar to TV's Big Brother, Harris placed tapped telephones, microphones and 32 robotic cameras in the home he shared with his girlfriend, Tanya Corrin. Viewers talked to Harris and Corrin in the site's chatroom. Others on camera included New York artists Alex Arcadia and Alfredo Martinez, as well as =JUDGECAL= and Shannon from pseudo.com fame. Harris launched the online live video platform, Operator 11.

DotComGuy arrived in 2000, and the following year, the Seeing-Eye-People Project combined live streaming with social networking to assist the visually challenged. After Joi Ito's Moblog (2002), web publishing from a mobile device, came Gordon Bell's MyLifeBits (2004), an experiment in digital storage of a person's lifetime, including full-text search, text/audio annotations and hyperlinks.

Over decades, Rick Kirkham shot more than 3000 hours of his video diaries, documenting his own descent from nationally syndicated broadcast journalist (Inside Edition) to the drug and alcohol abuse that destroyed his career and family life. His footage was edited into the documentary TV Junkie (2006). OurPrisoner was a 2006 internet "reality show" which featured a man living on camera for 6 months who had to follow viewer directions to win prizes.

In 2004, Arin Crumley and Susan Buice met online and began a relationship. They decided to forgo verbal communication during the initial courtship and instead spoke to each other via written notes, sketches, video clips and MySpace. They went on to create an autobiographical film about it called Four Eyed Monsters. It was part documentary, part narrative with a few scripted elements added. They went on to produce 13 podcasts about the making of the film in order to promote it.

==== Justin Kan ====
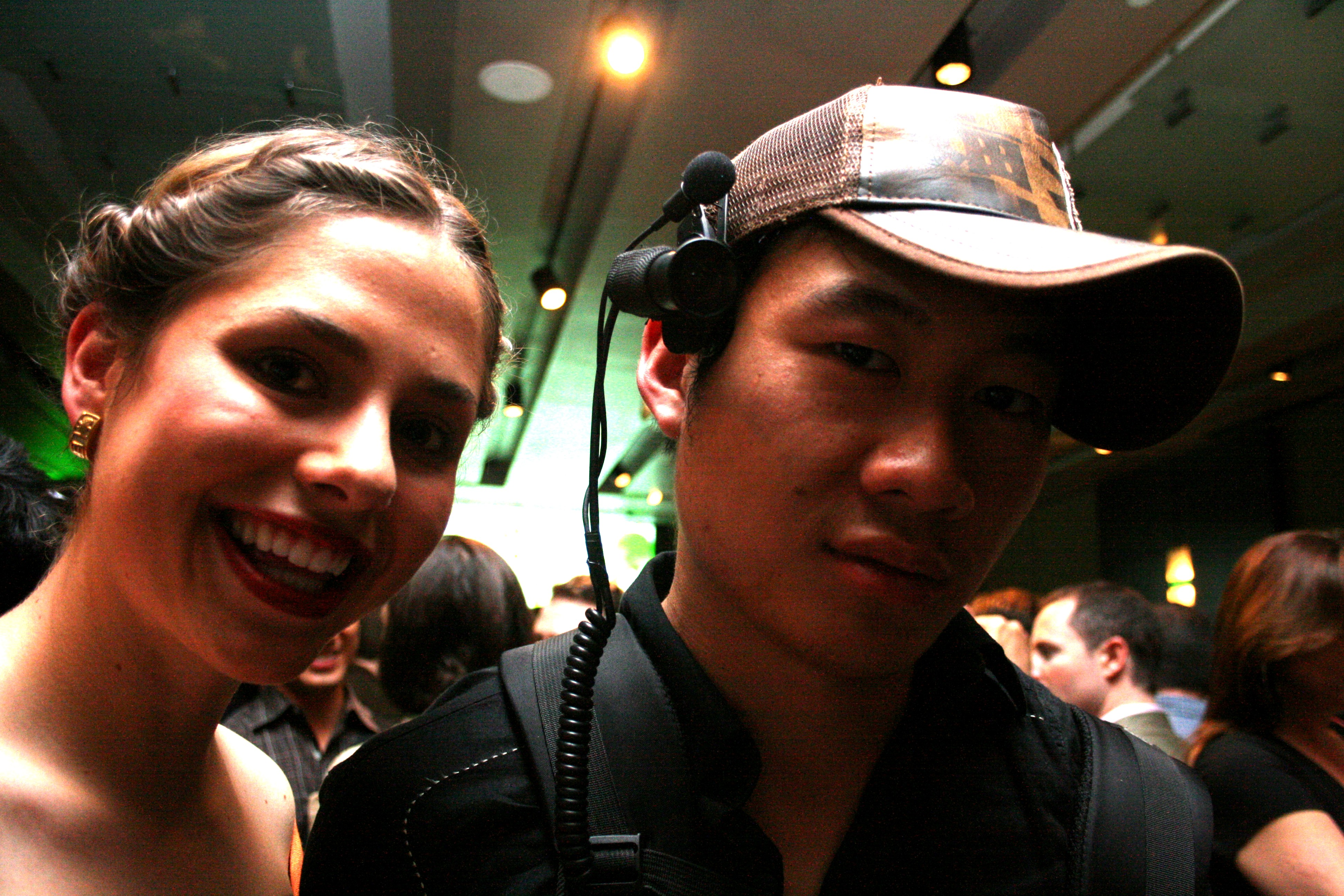
Entrepreneur and lifecaster Sarah Austin with Justin.tv founder Justin Kan in a photo by Brian Solis at DoubleClick's April 26, 2007 ad:tech party in San Francisco. Wearing the capcam, Kan was lifecasting at that event.

In San Francisco, in early 2007, Justin Kan founded Justin.tv, a platform for live video streaming online. Wearing a webcam attached to a cap, Kan began streaming continuous live video and audio, beginning at midnight March 19, 2007, and he named this procedure "lifecasting," apparently unaware of the accepted use of that term for a sculpting process. Kan announced that he would wear his camera "24 hours a day, seven days a week." The novelty of Kan's concept attracted media attention, and resulting interviews with him included one by Ann Curry on the Today Show. Viewers accompanied Kan as he walked the streets of San Francisco, sometimes involved in both pre-planned events (trapeze lesson, dance lesson) and also spontaneous situations (being invited into the local Scientology Center by a sidewalk recruiter). What viewers witnessed was all from Kan's subjective POV as seen from his 24/7 portable live video streaming system developed by Kyle Vogt, one of the four founders of Justin.tv. Vogt recalled:

I moved to San Francisco so I could be closer to the rest of the team. I mean really close. The four of us lived and worked out of a small two-bedroom apartment. I spent my time becoming an expert in Linux socket programming, cellphone data networks and realtime data protocols. Four data modems in close proximity just don't work well together, so packet loss was as high as 50%. I fought with these modems for weeks but finally managed to wrestle them into a single 1.2 Mbit/s video uplink. The new camera emerged from the pile of Radio Shack parts, computer guts and hacked-up cellphones that had accumulated on my messy desk. It uses thousands of lines of Python code, a custom real-time protocol, connection load balancing and several other funky hacks.

Vogt's mobile broadcasting hardware consisted of a proprietary Linux-based computer in a box, four Evolution-Data Optimized (EVDO) USB networking adapters, a commercially produced analog to MPEG-4 video encoder and a large lithium-ion battery with eight hours of running time. The setup currently used is one wireless EVDO networking card and a wearable computer (laptop in a backpack) the video is streamed at ten frames per second from Kan's location using a commercial off-the-shelf product from On2. The computer takes an encoded video stream from the camera and sends it to the main website.

==== Justin.tv expansion ====
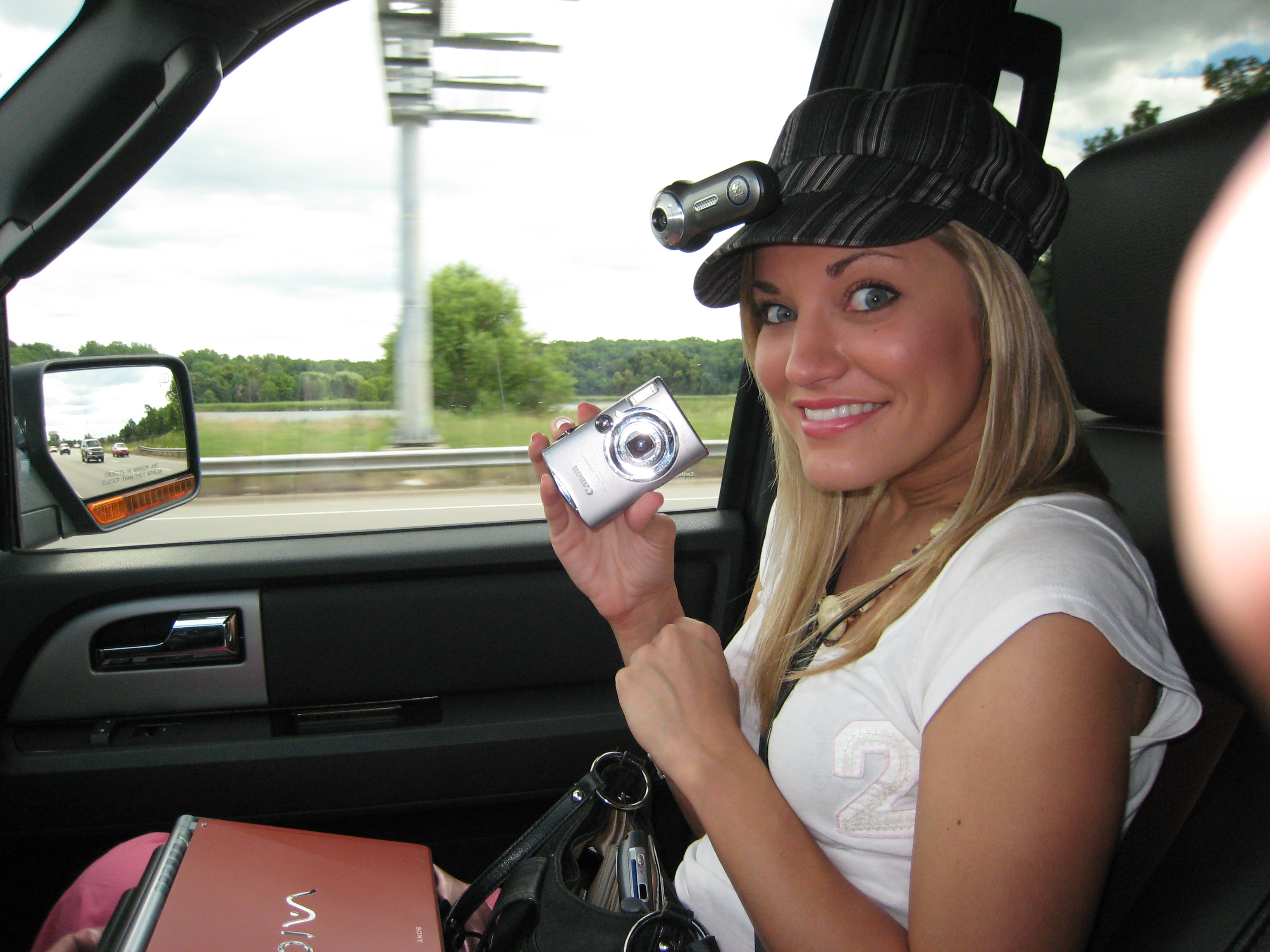
iJustine with her lifecasting equipment

On May 29, 2007, Justin.tv introduced a second 24/7 feed, hosted by designer iJustine in Pittsburgh. Ezarik took a different approach, often aiming the camera at herself instead of just showing what she was seeing. Attending various tech and media events or working on her design and video projects, she also spent much more time than Kan in communicating directly to her audience.

Kan's cryptic references to "the big rollout" became clear in the summer of 2007 when Justin.tv became a springboard for more than 60 different channels as it made its technology available to a continual flow of applicants. This included a wide variety of participants, from a Christian family and radio stations to college students, graphic designers and a Subaru repair shop. By August 2007, channels were being added at an average rate of two a day.

In September 2007, Justin.tv added a visual Directory at the top of the screen that worked in a manner similar to iTunes' Cover Flow. In that Directory one can scroll horizontally past each lifecaster and tell from the audio/video whether he or she is broadcasting, has walked away from the camera or has shut down. On September 30, 2007, reviews of channels and lifecasters began appearing on various Justin TV-related gossip blogs.

By the fall of 2007, Justin.tv had expanded to nearly 700 channels, generating 1,650 hours of daily programming, but frequent regulars stay in the forefront because hundreds of other lifecasters are on infrequently or rarely.

On October 2, 2007, Justin.tv became an open network, enabling anyone to register and broadcast his or her life. By October 13, Justin.tv had signed 3200 broadcasting accounts. Sites such as Justin.tv and Ustream.tv make it possible for anyone with a computer, a webcam, a microphone and an Internet connection to lifecast to a global audience. Some angle their camera to show themselves sitting at a computer, and they may or may not choose to communicate with viewers, either by speaking or typing in a chat area. Some leave their cameras on while they sleep. In some situations, a camera might show an empty room as the lifecaster walks around the house doing chores, totally ignoring the viewers.

As the beta testing of Justin.tv shifted to a full launch, Randall Stross examined the business aspects in The New York Times (October 14, 2007):

This month, after seven months of beta-phase broadcasting, Justin.tv formally declared that it was open for business to one and all. In its first five days, the company said, it created 18,500 hours of video and pulled in 500,000 unique visitors. What those statistics do not show is how long anyone stuck around. In a sampling I did last week during a weekday, only 44 viewers, on average, could be found at each of the eight most heavily visited channels.

Justin.tv has closed, but now runs the game streaming service twitch.tv.

==== Far horizons: Lisa Batey, Sarah Austin, Dylan Reichstadt and Justin Shattuck ====
Some lifecasters, such as newscaster-vocalist Janelle Stewart, use the technology to stage performances at a regular scheduled time, interview the live audience and plan a US and world tour around justin.tv viewers location. Lisa Batey, however, broadcast her entire life, talking constantly to viewers and informing them of her every decision in her Brooklyn apartment. Batey supplements her 24/7 streaming with entries she posts in her LiveJournal, not unlike the diary entries written by JenniCam. In August 2007, Batey did extensive technical research so that she could continue to broadcast without interruptions or equipment problems while she vacationed in Tokyo and Kyoto during September 2007. The following year, she moved to Tokyo and continued to lifecast from there before moving to Brazil in 2011. A pioneer in the field, Batey has been lifecasting since 1999 when she was 20 years old.

Tristan Couvares is the most publicized life caster yet, Tristan teamed up with Seth Green to take life casting interactive in Control TV. They packaged the interactive media with major corporate sponsors: Ford, Sprint Nextel, and Snickers. The show was streamed live 24/7, and short, re-cap episodes were posted every few days. The fans of Control TV had been dubbed "the controllers" and voted on various aspects of daily life such as what Tristan would eat, when he would wake up and what he would wear. At one point, the majority of the viewers voted for Tristan Couvares to have an hour off camera. The show had over 105 million press impressions from 31 outlets including Variety, ESPN, and CNN. In total he had over 14 million viewers and users stayed on the site for an average of 27 minutes.

Sarah Austin began her media career as a tech news producer and DJ for three years at UC Berkeley's radio station, KALX 90.7 FM, moving into video with her d7tv.com series Party Crashers which displayed her exploits crashing Silicon Valley parties. She started lifecasting in San Francisco during the spring of 2007, and when she moved to New York in August 2007 she continued to lifecast. As a video journalist, she began attending a variety of events, including the Halo 3 launch, the Ground Zero Memorial service, New York Fashion Week and Comic Book Club meetings. She sometimes chatted with her viewers while having breakfast, and more often, left the camera on as she studied her college textbooks. She amplified her video journalism with reports in the Sarah Meyers blog. In November 2007 she began tests of her 2008 Pop17 show, an Internet series of tech news, cyber commentary, interviews and unusual video clips.

Dylan Reichstadt, a teenager from Minnesota, started broadcasting his life in 2007. Reichstadt was featured on KARE 11 television in December 2008. He uses justin.tv and broadcasts by using his laptop, an EVDO card, his camera, and his hat for the Hat Cam.. He has multiple sponsors that help pay for costs associated to broadcasting including: Boston musician Nick Consone and Wirecast. As of today, Reichstadt has over 5,500 fans and the views on his broadcasting page are over 2 million. He has a fan page at dylanlooksgreatinties.wordpress.com.

Justin Shattuck took lifecasting to a new level in July 2007 by using a GPS unit. He picked up real estate entrepreneur, Mark Timms in Charleston, South Carolina and attempted to travel to the 48 continental states in seven days. The GPS unit made it possible for viewers to follow their exact location as a moving dot on a map. The 48/7 trip ended with exhausted Shattuck with a late night confession from a Brooklyn rooftop. Shattuck gave people rides to wherever they wanted to go, no matter how distant the destination.

==== Pivoting pictures: The mobile music of Jody Gnant ====
Others lifecasters, such as singer-songwriter Jody Marie Gnant, have used the new media for promotional purposes, gaining both viewers and press coverage as she began video streaming her life seven days a week on Ustream.tv. This lifecasting strategy boosted sales with preorders for her album Pivot:

Less than a week after starting her broadcast, she had the No. 3 video on MySpace with 186,000 views. Her music is also being showcased as part of ScreenVison's pre-show entertainment in 4,000 movie theaters nationwide... "It's an exciting combination of interactive and non-interactive media," says Gnant. "People can choose to tune in and just watch the events of my life unfold, or they can log on and have an immediate effect on my career."

==== Camstreams ====
Patrick Cornwell is the owner and manager of Camstreams, a streaming service located in Sheffield, England. It features such channels as the Online Piano Bar and Trucking with Ken. Cornwell recalled how his fascination with webcams led him to develop and launch Camstreams:

Webcams fascinated me from the moment I read about them in a Sunday newspaper in the summer of 1997. It was an article about JenniCam – a website by a woman called Jennifer Ringley who chose to show her life to the world, warts 'n' all. She had inadvertently created the first "Reality" show – it was definitely the start of an era.
I spent my student years with the camera turned on me, maintaining a Big Brother-style website (way before Big Brother, the TV show, began!) with six live webcams in our student house. My housemates and I were sucked into the media frenzy and were even the subject of a documentary on the BBC for precisely 15 minutes. With Camstreams, I want to give people a chance to get their 15 minutes... Camstreams allows you to put yourself in the frame with our completely free video and audio webcam streaming service. We love playing with webcam technology and wanted to start something new and easy for people to use.

==== Qik ====
In 2008, a mobile live video streaming software called Qik was launched. It gained popularity among lifecasters with famous people like Ashton Kutcher and Kevin Rose being frequent users of the software. Also in 2008 lifecasting found its way into Social Networking at Next2Friends with their introduction of live streamed video from mobile.

== Future perspectives ==
The act of displaying online real-life experience is increasing the development of artificial intelligence. At the moment, web pages are made to be read by humans. However, in time, Semantic Web, as an extension of the Web, aims to convert information into data to enable computers to read and understand the content. The development of this project will lead to machines with artificial intelligence that can assist and work for humans.

Ray Kurzweil, director of engineering at Google, is convinced that media creation and technological advancement are converging to technological singularity. Hence, today's development is the first step towards human's ability to "transcend its biological limitations."

Kevin Rose the co-founder of Digg, talks at length about lifestreaming and the benefits of it, such as the opportunity to organize bits of information and experience in a detailed digital diary. "I can see a world where eventually my children will look back at my [lifestream] data and say: This is Kevin's story—this is where he was on his birthday 10 years ago, and this was his favorite place to eat. Building that profile throughout your life and saving [that information]—I think that is huge."

== See also ==
- Activity stream
- Augmented reality
- DaCast
- BlogTV
- Digital footprint
- EveryScape
- Federated identity
- The Final Cut (2004 film), a movie about ethical challenges related to lifestreams and editing them.
- Fly on the wall
- Google Glass
- Hasan M. Elahi
- If I Can Dream
- The Invention of Morel
- Justin.tv
- Live streaming
- Snapchat
- Social network service
- Sophie Calle
- Sousveillance
- Tinychat
- Tom Green Live
- Ustream
