= Westbrooks =

Westbrooks is a surname. Notable people with the surname include:

- Aaron Westbrooks (born 1986), Irish basketball player
- Ethan Westbrooks (born 1990), American football player
- Greg Westbrooks (born 1953), American football player
- Lavelle Westbrooks (born 1992), American football player
