= Ana Voog =

American blogger and musician (born 1966)

- Born: 18 April 1966 (age 60)
- Genres: Pop rock, experimental pop
- Occupations: Singer-songwriter, musician, performance artist, visual artist, writer, hypnotist and mother
- Instruments: Guitar, bass, keyboard, vocals
- Years active: 1986–present
- Formerly of: The Blue Up?
- Website: anavoog.com/anacam.com/index.html

Ana Clara Voog (born 18 April 1966) is a musician, visual artist, performance artist and writer from Minneapolis, Minnesota. Voog is the former front woman of The Blue Up?, a pop rock band from the Minneapolis area. On 22 August 1997 Voog began anacam, one of the first webcams (inspired by JenniCam) that lifecasted, i.e., broadcast twenty-four hours a day live from a home. In her own words anacam was "the internet's 1st 24/7 art+life cam!"

== Early life ==
Voog was born under a different name to a Lutheran minister father. She later changed her name to Ana Clara Voog. Voog attended high school in Stillwater, Minnesota.

== Musical career ==
Before her fame as a 1990s pop culture phenomenon, a musical-visual-word artist, and one of the first internet media artists, she had local success as the frontwoman of the Minneapolis experimental pop band The Blue Up?. She released an EP called Now and a single called "We are the Garden". In 1995 she released a record on Columbia Records. Ms Voog was signed by David Kahne, who has produced records for famous household names like Paul McCartney or The Bangles. Before that the band was under contract with Midnight Music Records.

After the group disbanded in 1996, she signed onto Radioactive/Wasteland Records (MCA) with support from Prince and the Revolution drummer Bobby Z who then became her manager. Recordings at Paisley Park followed in collaboration with musicians David Sylvian and Ingrid Chavez on the track 'I was waving at you'. David Sylvian on his contribution:

"The collaboration was primarily between Ingrid and Ana. They created a spoken word piece and were in something of a rush for a complementary backing track due to an urgent completion date. Budget problems I believe. Ana asked if I could come up with something. I did. More sound collage than composition if I remember correctly. The album was shelved for a couple of years but I understand it’s now due to be released. We haven’t heard the final results but wish her well with the project."

Due to the inherent misogyny she found in the industry Voog left the business and went on to do anacam.

The name of the record “Cake and Eat It” was the muse to Courtney love's famous line.

On YouTube there is a video featuring John Peel announcing Come Alive by The Blue Up? John Peelś Blue Up?.

== The anacam years ==
On 22 August 1997, Voog began a webcam project named anacam. Besides a view into Voog's personal life, anacam also incorporated performance art and visual experimentation. Daily activities such as cooking dinner, vacuuming and hosting visitors filled out the non-interactive periods on anacam. Other activities on the webcam range from chatting with cam-watchers, playing music and ornate performance pieces involving household items.

While sex and nudity played only a small part in what could be seen on anacam, Voog gained considerable attention, and criticism, for the portrayal of nudity and sexual activity on her site.

Voog distinguished the racier elements of her project from pornography, stating that the "site isn't about sex, but sexuality and SENSUALITY..." In contrast with one-time collaborator Isabellacam, which was self-described as "a completely original take on female produced erotic content", Voog views sexuality on anacam as a part of her life, as she describes in the rest of the quotation: "...is a PART of this site because that is part of my life."

From the beginning of anacam, Voog accompanied the webcam with a blog on her site called analog, and she had a presence on LiveJournal starting in 2000. Voog transcribed her earlier, hand-written journals to her online blog. She expresses herself in many forms of writing. Voog also produced many varieties of art, including video, paintings, drawings, and photographs. Since 1998, the most prolific part of her work was done in so-called anagrams.

On anacam.com, a section of the site called anapix was dedicated to pictures created by users using Voog's work. In May 2002, Voog began to freeform crochet hats. Each is unique, and she sells them via her website.

On Voog's online work, Jorn Barger, who is credited with coining the word weblog, states:

She was trying to live her life 100 per cent openly, which I thought was a righteous ideal. I wanted to emulate it in my own way by logging everything I found interesting, whether art or politics or silliness or even occasionally good porn.

A number of newspapers and magazines have written about Voog and anacam, including Newsweek, USA Today, Playboy, and Yahoo! Internet Life.

Television appearances include Hard Copy, Vibe, A&E, Net Cafe, and E!. She also appeared on an episode of the early video blog by Jennifer Ringley of Jennicam.

Voog conducted an interview with Tori Amos on November 20, 1999. On her site she documented the encounter and wrote:

"november 18th, 1999 at 7pm was the unveiling of tori amos' new official website, www.toriamos.com! to go along with the grand opening, they showed the premiere of a conversation i had with tori amos in NYC on october 20th, 1999that u could see and hear on streaming vid. it's was 1/2 an hour long ( edited down from an hour ) and i think it turned out very well! if you want to know how on earth i got to be so lucky, go read my tori stories below! :) yay :)"

Voog has repeatedly rejected the notion that her appearances on her webcam and elsewhere were and are expressed via a persona. "i do not like to censor. i do not have a public persona. what you see is what you get." Her efforts have not been completely successful.

In August 2009, Voog turned off her webcam on the 12th anniversary of the site, ending her live, 24-hour-a-day broadcasts.

A number of public archives of Voog's work have fallen into serious disrepair. However, a representative selection has been published in J.D. Casten's book on Voog, Dreaming on Stage. Since Voog lost her original anacam.com domain to a cybersquatter some years after the end of her lifecast, her original content (in a state of disrepair due to no longer functioning hard links) was moved in mid-2019 to anavoog.com and is generally usable again (though without live picture updates). Repairs are ongoing.

Since the end of anacam, Voog has remained active on social media and as a video artist, while raising her children. In 2019, she learned to be a hypnotist but, as of end of 2020, due to the pandemic, had not yet begun to work in that field.

== Video work ==
Most of her work with video can be seen on her Vimeo account or her Instagram account.

== Photography and other visual artwork ==
During her whole career Voog painted, did artistic photography and artwork often based on photography or pictures from anacam. Parts of this work can be seen on her website. Art installations by Voog have been hosted by the New York City Museum of Modern Art, and in the Walker Art Center and the Weisman Art Museum. She also sells her visual artwork.

== Writing ==
Voog published and still publishes poetry and stream-of-consciousness work, along with other writings. She is a writer of "anagrams, collections of text, links, art, music, the extraordinary and the mundane," a kind of blog that often takes the possibilities of the form to the limit.

== Personal life ==
On 30 July 2007, she had her first child, which was conceived and birthed on cam.

In 2020 she became a hypnotist and as of 2021 is an astrologer.

She states that in Human Design her profile is 2/45, the hermit heretic. She is also a quad right RAX Cross of Laws. In the Myers-Briggs test she is an INFJ. Her birth information is April 18, 1966, at 11:56 am, in Saint Paul, Minnesota.

Voog, despite her fame among some users of the internet, discusses in her work that she is an introvert who had to overcome adversity all her life (she talks about that in her anagrams and analogs).

== Awards ==
In 1999 Voog received 2 Minnesota Music Awards for Best Electronic Music and Best Electronic Recording (anavoog.com).

In 2000 she received 2 South by Southwest awards for Best Webcam and the Peoples Choice Award.

== Discography ==
=== Recordings by The Blue Up? ===
- "We are the Garden" b/w "It's My Life" (first single, 1986: vinyl)
- Now (EP 1987: vinyl; German version, 1988)
- "Everything Is" (on Kaleidoscope – Exploding Underground Compilation, 1988: vinyl)
- "Were You a Friend?" (on Let's Talk About Boys – German compilation 1988: vinyl)
- Introducing Sorrow (1989; was to be released by Midnight Music London, but they went bankrupt. Was then released in mp3 format in ana2.com, May 1999)
- Cake and Eat It (1992: CD and cassette)
- "Pink Turns to Blue" (on Du Huskers – Hüsker Dü tribute album, 1993: vinyl, CD, and cassette)
- "Breathe You Out" (1995: CD single)
- "Breathe You Out" (on Soundbites – compilation, 1995: cassette)
- Spool Forka Dish (1995: promo cassette)
- Spool Forka Dish (1995), mixed by Grammy award winner Michael Brauer
- "Frovarp" (on Minnesota Modern Rock – compilation, 1995)

=== Solo recordings ===
- Mother Anorexia (demo) (on Radioactive – compilation, 1996)
- Telepathic You & Please God (on Radioactive – compilation, 1997)
- Please God (1997: promo CD)
- Anavoog.com (promo CD)
- Four remixes
- AnaVoog.com (1998) (on Hollywood Remixes, 1998: vinyl)
