= Pimloc =

Pimloc Limited
- Company type: Private
- Industry: Artificial intelligence, Computer vision, Privacy technology
- Founded: 16 March 2016
- Founders: Simon Randall, James Leigh, Julian Morris
- Headquarters: London, England, UK
- Services: AI-powered redaction, privacy and analytics of images, video, audio

Pimloc (registered as Pimloc Limited) is a technology company that develops artificial-intelligence software for automated redaction, privacy and analytics of images, video and audio. Its principal product is the Secure Redact platform, a multimodal SaaS and API service designed to detect and irreversibly anonymise personally identifiable information.

== History ==
Pimloc was founded by Simon Randall, James Leigh and Julian Morris and incorporated in England and Wales as Pimloc Limited on 16 March 2016. The company originates from the founders’ work on the Autographer wearable camera and early experiments in private image search.

In November 2017 Pimloc demonstrated early work on a private image-library search product called Pholio. In October 2020, Pimloc closed an early seed round (reported at roughly $1.8 million), led by Amadeus Capital with participation from Speedinvest. In January 2022 the company announced a larger seed extension of about $7.5 million with investment from Zetta Ventures alongside existing backers including Amadeus and Speedinvest.

In 2023, Pimloc's Chief Technology Officer, James Leigh, was recognised as Privacy Technology Leader.

In September 2024, Pimloc announced integrations and pilot deployments with major partners, including an integration with Eagle Eye Networks and a pilot with Sussex Police to accelerate multimedia redaction and subject-access workflows.

Over 2024–2025, Pimloc added audio named-entity recognition and redaction in April 2025 and launched automated screen anonymisation in June 2025 and published commercial case studies such as a May 2025 insurance use case with Aviva.

In July 2025, Pimloc raised $5 million from Amadeus Capital, Edge Ventures, Zetta Ventures, MD One and Symvan Capital to support global expansion.

== Operations ==
Pimloc develops and operates Secure Redact, a multimodal artificial-intelligence platform for automated detection and redaction of personally identifiable information (PII) in images, video, audio and derived text. The system applies computer-vision and natural-language models to identify items such as faces, vehicle registration plates, on-screen text and named entities in audio, and to apply irreversible anonymisation where required.

Secure Redact is offered primarily as a cloud-delivered SaaS product and via RESTful APIs, and it is also made available through partner ecosystems and integrations with video management and evidence-management platforms. The platform is engineered for real-world sources of footage including fixed CCTV, body-worn cameras and in-vehicle (dash) cameras, and it supports both automated bulk processing and manual review workflows.
