= Lifestream =

Lifestream may refer to:

- Lifestreaming, "a time-ordered stream of documents that functions as a diary of your electronic life", coined by Eric Freeman and David Gelernter
- Lifestream, the planet's lifeforce in video game Final Fantasy VII
