= Janina Turek =

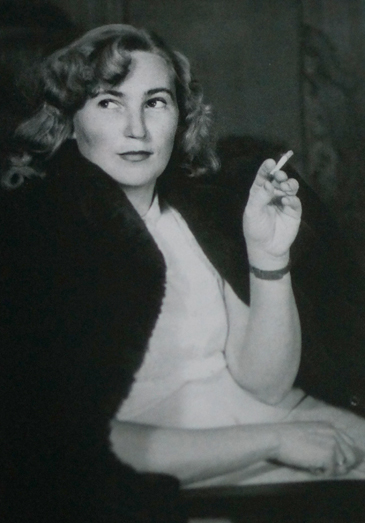
Janina Turek

Janina Turek (21 November 1921 - 12 November 2000) was the author of one of the longest life accounts, also known as factologies.

== Biography ==
Her mother, Marianna Gąsiorska, was 42 when Janina was born in Krakow, Poland. Janina's father, Teofil Gurtler, was a city office worker. He made additional income by giving drawing classes. He created copies of many established and popular Polish oil painters, such as Jacek Malczewski, Józef Chełmoński, Bronisława Rychter Janowska.

Janina attended public boarding schools for girls in Kraków. At that time, Poland had a single-sex public education system. Her good grades were often rewarded with books. Reading and literary analysis became Janina's greatest passion.

During the Second World War and the German occupation, she was greatly disappointed that the Kraków Public Library was closed by the occupying forces. Due to the war, she could not take high school graduation exams and her dream of studying pharmacology was disrupted.

Janina Turek lived with her family on Słoneczna Street (today's Bolesław Prus Street). She married Czesław Turek in November 1941 in Norbertanek's Monastery, Salwator, and they moved to an apartment on Moniuszki street.

In February 1943, the Gestapo arrested Janina's husband. At the time, she was in her 5th month of pregnancy. After being taken to the local jail on Montelupich Street, Janina's husband was deported to the concentration camp in Auschwitz-Birkenau. In the same year, Janina's father was relocated to an apartment number 6 on Parkowa street in Podgórze, where Janina also lived until her death.

Due to the war, she had to share her apartment with other tenants. In 1943 she gave birth to her son, Lesław. Despite harsh conditions and poverty, Janina never gave up her commitment to reading and writing. In 1943 she began her “factography”. It is a highly meticulous and detailed account of the events in her everyday life, scrupulously written in accordance to several self-established rules. This work was continued over the next 57 years until her death in 2000.

Her only brother Ignacy died in 1945. The same year her husband Czesław came back from the concentration camp. In 1947 she gave birth to her second child, a son, Jerzy, and in 1951, a daughter Ewa. After her divorce in 1958, she was successively employed as a shop assistant in a local grocery store, as an office worker at a post office, and as a secretary. Her life is associated with the city of Kraków.

== Work and legacy ==
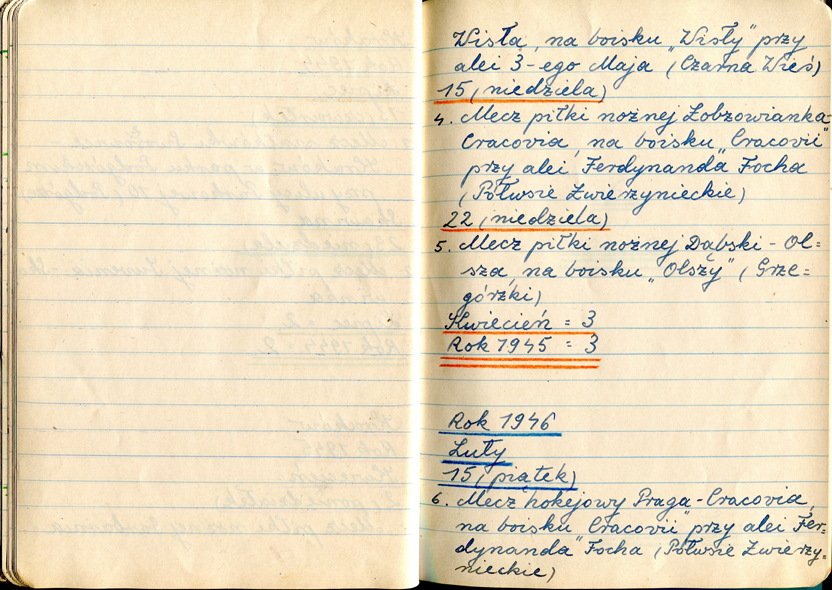
One of Janina Turek's 745 notebooks

Janina Turek was not associated with any literary organization or political movement. Thus, her work can be regarded as related to outsider art. During her lifetime, Turek kept her work secret. The extensive legacy she left behind was posthumously discovered by her family. This legacy comprises 745 notebooks, with 410,000 consistently annotated and categorized facts from the author's everyday life.

Turek divided her life into 33 categories. Each entry was accompanied by a date, name of the day, number, and color signifying the category to which the entry belonged. All of the entries were summarized monthly and yearly. Each year has a specific color that is repeated after a 10-year cycle. Each notebook had a signature, number, and subnumber.

The idea for keeping such a detailed account of everyday life developed gradually. Beginning in 1939, Janina Turek wrote an account of her life entitled "Notebook, rather Diary" (in Polish it is "pamiętnik, raczej dziennik". 'pamiętnik' means a notebook for one's memories whereas 'dziennik' refers to a daily log of events.).

In 1939, Turek wrote about her concerns regarding an inability to register on paper all she wanted to memorize and preserve. Four years later she began working on her magnum opus.

Among many other aspects of everyday life, Janina Turek recorded in her account 15,786 meals with a detailed description of all ingredients, 84,523 persons noticed unintentionally, 23,397 people spontaneously encountered, 36,822 visitors, 1,922 people with whom she arranged meetings, 38,196 phone calls, 44,453 received gifts, 26,683 gifts with particular notes (i.e. a field flower, one orange), 3,517 books and magazines, and 70,042 films and TV programs.

== Related works ==
- Dymaxion Chronofile
- Erkki Kurenniemi
- Tehching Hsieh
- On Kawara
- Roman Opalka
- Vivian Maier
- Jacopo Pontormo
- George Perec

== Bibliography ==
Most of the following bibliography is in Polish.

1. Mariusz Szczygieł, a report "Reality" Gazeta Wyborcza, July 2001

2. TV Talk-Show, Mariusz Szczygieł. A conversation with Janina Turek

3. Joanna Zięba, Master's degree supervised by Prof. Andrzej Mancwel "Z archiwum życia Janiny Turek" ("From Janina Turek's Archive) Warsaw University, Polish Philology Department. In 2002 the work was featured in the magazine La Faute a Rousseau

4. Mariusz Szczygieł, a report "Reality" in a book "Cała Polska Trzaska" with French and German translation.

5. Paweł Rodak, an article "Dziennik pisarza: między codzienną praktyką piśmienną a literaturą", Pamiętnik Literacki : czasopismo kwartalne poświęcone historii i krytyce literatury polskiej 97/4, str. 38 ( Literacki's novelist: quarterly journal devoted to the history and criticism of Polish literature 97/4, p. 38)

6. Paweł Rodak, "Dni Dzienników" ("The days of diaries") presented during a Word Festival supported by Leonardo da Vinci Programme funded by European Commission, Warsaw University.

7. oryginal notebooks displayed for the first time on the show curated by Dominik Kuryłek, Roman Dziadkiewicz, Ewa Tatar an exhibition "Imhibition" at National Museum in Kraków, December - January, 2006–7.

8. Imhibition, ed. Roman Dziadkiewicz and Ewa Tatar, National Museum in Kraków, Korporacja Ha!art, Kraków 2006.

9. Joanna Dolna, "Zaksięgowane życie" ("An accounted life"), Gazeta Krakowska, June 2, 2006.

10. Original notebooks displayed at the Contemporary Art Center in Torun, Poland, June 2008.

11. Ewa Tatar, I were to stop writing, I'd have to return, God forbid, to Myself, in: Flowers of Our Lives, ed. Joanna Zielińska, Toruń 2008.

12. Ewa Tatar, The Diaryst, Janina Turek, as a collector of everyday life, in: The Modernity of Collection, ed. Tomasz de Rosset, Toruń 2011.

13. My diary is Me, it' s my whole life, a conversation with Ewa Janeczek, daughter of Janina Turek, Flowers of Our Lives, ed. Joanna Zielińska, Toruń 2008.

14. Mariusz Szczygieł, a report "Reality" w La LIBERTA.

15. Daria Deflorian and Antonio Tagliarini, a theater play based on Janiny Turek presented at the conference "Nie wystarczy być kobietą" ("It is not enough to be a woman"). The play was later shown in Paris and Rome in 2012.

16. Krzysztof and Jan Kuc (Firma reklamowa KUC), an exhibition featuring 10 original notebooks in a shopping center BONARKA in Kraków, October 2014.

17. Jacek Smolicki and Alberto Frigo, a group show and discussion panel "The Art of Self-Tracking " in San Francisco. Janina Turek and her works presented among other artists and authors of multimedia diaries from all around the world, June 2015.
