= SweaterGxd =

American streamer (born 1996)

- Born: Adrian Javier Sandoval; November 16, 1996 (age 29); Los Angeles, California, U.S.
- Occupation: Live streamer

Kick information
- Channel: sweatergxd
- Years active: 2023–present
- Followers: 71.8 thousand

Twitch information
- Channel: SweaterGxd
- Years active: 2016–present
- Followers: 7.7 thousand

YouTube information
- Channel: Sweater Gxd
- Years active: 2018–present
- Genre: Music
- Subscribers: 1.02 thousand (August 31, 2025)
- Views: 6.6 thousand (August 31, 2025)

Adrian Javier Sandoval (born November 16, 1996), known online as SweaterGxd, is an American internet personality and online streamer. He gained recognition through his participation in the streaming community for broadcasting himself live doing IRL streams and online gambling. He participated in Adin Ross' boxing event in February 2025, losing his fight. SweaterGxd created his Kick channel in 2022 and officially started streaming on the platform in 2023, where he collaborated with streamers such as Adin Ross.

== Streaming career ==
SweaterGxd primarily streams on Kick, where he is known to broadcast himself live doing IRL streams and online gambling. Over the years, he has collaborated with streamers such as Adin Ross. In 2025, Complex listed SweaterGxd at number 19 on the "Top 25 Up-And-Coming streamers" list on February 12, 2025.

On October 10, 2023, while live-streaming, SweaterGxd encountered a police presence near him. He learned that a shooting had taken place and that an individual was injured.

== Boxing record ==
1 fight	0 wins	1 loss
By knockout	0	0
By decision	0	1
By disqualification	0	0

No.	Result	Record	Opponent	Type	Round, time	Date	Location	Notes
1	Loss	0-1	(United States) Alijah Kelly	Decision	Round 3	Feb 1, 2025	Brand Risk Warehouse, Miami, Florida, U.S.	Judges declared Alijah Kelly the winner as a result of a unanimous decision against SweaterGxd after 3 rounds

== See also ==
- List of YouTubers
