= Walls of Sand =

- Directed by: Erica Jordan
- Written by: Erica Jordan; Shirin Etessam
- Produced by: Erica Jordan; Shirin Etessam
- Starring: Shirin Etessam; Jan Carty Marsh
- Cinematography: Tracy Hodson; Erica Jordan
- Edited by: Erica Jordan; Shirin Etessam
- Music by: Cristopher Kazor
- Distributed by: Ginger Productions
- Release date: October 6, 2000
- Running time: 115 minutes
- Country: United States
- Language: English

Walls of Sand is a 1994 American independent film directed and produced by Erica Jordan and co-produced by Shirin Etessam. It is notable for being the first contemporary feature film to be webcast on the Internet.

== Plot ==
Soraya (Shirin Etessam) is a young Iranian woman living in San Francisco, California. She has no contact with her fellow Iranian emigrants, who disapprove of her living in an unmarried state with an American boyfriend. After two years, their relationship ends due to his refusal to commit to marriage. Soroya, who lacks a green card to enable her continued residency in the U.S., takes a job as the au pair for a young boy living with his divorced, agoraphobic mother (Jan Carty Marsh). The woman's ex-husband, using the promise of securing a green card for Soroya, coerces her to provide information on the household, which would then be used in an upcoming custody battle over parental rights to the child.

== Production history ==
Shirin Etessam and Erica Jordan first met while they were students at San Francisco State University. They collaborated on the screenplay for Walls of Sand and raised the funds for their $80,000 budget through a sponsorship from the nonprofit organization Women Make Movies and the maxing out of 12 credit cards.

== Distribution ==
Shot in black and white 16mm, Walls of Sand was shown at the Independent Feature Film Market (IFFM) in New York City in September 1995, at the Film Arts Festival in San Francisco in November 1995, and at the Slamdance Film Festival in Park City, Utah, in January 1996. However, it did not receive a theatrical commercial release.

In March 1998, Walls of Sand was presented for real time viewing on The Sync, an Internet webcasting network. The Sync had already presented several short films and two classic public domain silent features, The Cabinet of Dr. Caligari (1919) and Nosferatu (1922), but no contemporary feature film had been made available for free real-time webcast viewing prior to Walls of Sand. (In 1993, the feature film Wax or the Discovery of Television Among the Bees was presented in an invitation-only, one-time non-webcast hypertext transmission to a few dozen computer laboratories.)

Jordan, in an interview with the New York Times, stated that she was taking a gamble in putting her film online, particularly at a time when Internet speeds were still relatively slow. "We're taking a chance," she said. "I know the quality is bad."

In a later interview with Film Threat, Jordan questioned whether the Internet was the proper medium for viewing movies. "Is this really the way we want to watch movies?" she asked. "Will having films on the Internet add to the general public's appreciation for independent films? Will the 'digital divide' get smaller or larger, opening films to a greater or less diverse population?"

Walls of Sand was released on VHS video in 2000. The Sync shut down its operations in 2002 and Walls of Sand is no longer available for webcast viewing. To date, Walls of Sand has not been released on DVD.
