= OurPrisoner =

OurPrisoner was a 2006 Internet reality television show that featured 35-year-old man Kieran Vogel, who lived on camera for 24 hours a day, seven days a week, for an entirety of six months in a single-family New Jersey home.

The show began on June 14, 2006. All of Vogel's actions were to be controlled by the public. Through a series of votes, viewers were to choose what he ate, what he wore, what he did, and whom he saw. In September, he was required to stay awake for 48 hours straight.

The OurPrisoner show came to an end on 15 December 2006 and Vogel received 40,000 shares of the BigString penny stock as his prize. Had he failed to perform any tasks, he would have received nothing.

The series was created by BigString Interactive. BigString's CEO Darin Myman was the creator of the show.

BigString announced that a second series would be held, but it never surfaced.

== See also ==
- Lifecasting (video stream)
