= Snack Boy =

Comedy webcast series

Snack Boy was a comedy show webcast distributed by The Sync over the Internet, from 1998 through 2001. The show starred Terry Crummitt (1972–2004), a Washington, D.C.-area unemployed actor, who presented comic anecdotes concerning his shaky career, his raucous family, and his various misadventures. The show's title referred to Crummitt's former work as a snack bar manager. Crummitt created original childlike drawings to illustrate each story, which ran exactly five minutes. The show was webcast live on weekdays at 3:15pm Eastern Time, with older episodes archived for on-demand viewing.

Snack Boy was among the first webcast-exclusive programs to gain attention from the mainstream media, and Crummitt was briefly the center of press attention. However, when The Sync closed during the dot-com industry collapse, his visibility waned. Several episodes of the program remain online.

Performing under the name Terry McCrea, Crummitt had small roles in films and television shows that were shot in the Washington and Baltimore areas, including Gods and Generals and Cecil B. Demented. Crummitt was killed in an automobile accident in Laurel, Maryland, his home town, on May 13, 2004; he was 31 years old.
