= Aaron Westbrooks =

Irish basketball player (born 1986)

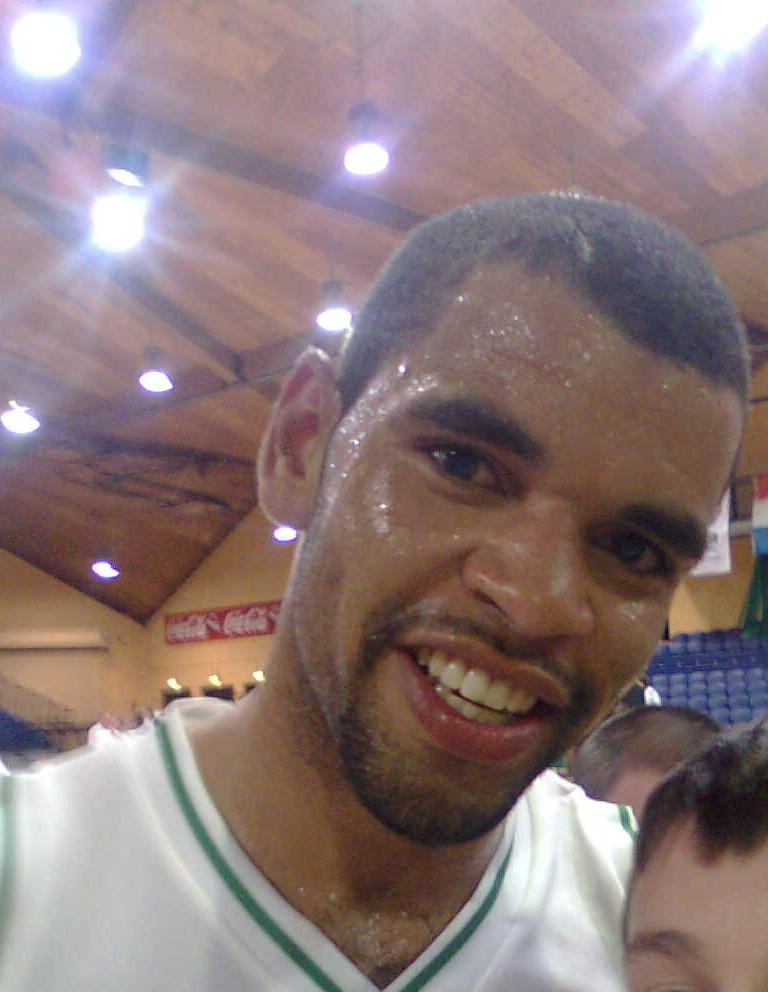

Personal information
- Born: 25 November 1986 (age 39) Dublin, Ireland
- Listed height: 6 ft 4 in (1.93 m)
- Listed weight: 200 lb (91 kg)

Career information
- High school: St. Fintan's (Dublin, Ireland)
- College: Trinity (CT) (2005–2009)
- NBA draft: 2010: undrafted
- Playing career: 2009–2010
- Position: Shooting guard / small forward

Career history
- 2004–2005: Killester
- 2009–2010: Leicester Riders

Career highlights
- NESCAC Defensive Player of the Year (2008)

Aaron Matthew Westbrooks (born 25 November 1986) is an Irish former professional basketball player. He played for the Irish Under 20 national team, and the senior national team.

== Early career ==
Born and raised in Dublin, Ireland, Westbrooks attended St. Fintan's High School where he was part of the All-Ireland Championship team. His father, Jerome, coached Killester of the Irish Superleague during the 2004–05 season. As a 17-year-old, Westbrooks was entrusted by his father to fill the void left by a departing player. In 19 games for Killester in 2004–05, he averaged 7.1 points, 3.6 rebounds, 1.8 assists and 2.0 steals per game.

== College career ==
In 2005, Westbrooks moved to the United States and enrolled at Trinity College. He subsequently joined the Bantams men's basketball team for his freshman season in 2005–06. He went on to help the Bantams win the 2008 NESCAC championship while garnering NESCAC Defensive Player of the Year honours for the season. In his four-year career at Trinity, he played 102 games (100 starts) and averaged 6.0 points, 3.5 rebounds and 1.8 assists per game.

== Professional career ==
After graduating from Trinity College in 2009, Westbrooks signed with the Leicester Riders of the British Basketball League for the 2009–10 season. In his lone professional season, he played 37 games and averaged 3.7 points and 1.8 rebounds per game.

Westbrooks was set to re-join Killester for the 2010–11 season, but ultimately did not.

== Personal life ==
Westbrooks is the son of Jerome and Lois Westbrooks, and has four siblings: Michael, Isaac, Leah and Eric. Michael and Isaac both played alongside Westbrooks with the Irish national team during the 2009 European qualifiers. All three of his brothers also had stints playing for Killester, while his sister played college basketball for Mount St. Mary's University in Maryland.

Westbrooks is the Founder and Camp Director of Euro Star Basketball Camp.
