= The Sync =

Former Maryland-based webcasting company

The Sync was an independently owned and operated webcasting company that pioneered the presentation of original and exclusive webcast entertainment content. Started by Thomas Edwards and Carla Cole in 1997 and based in Laurel, Maryland, the company made history in 1998 by presenting Erica Jordan’s film “Walls of Sand” for real time viewing. This was the first time that a contemporary feature film was made available for online viewing.

The Sync also produced original programming, most notably The Jenni Show starring Jennifer Ringley of JenniCam fame, and the daily monologue comedy show Snack Boy starring Terry Crummitt.

The Sync also presented the "Independent Exposure" festival of independently made short films produced by Blackchair Productions. Net surfers could vote on the winning titles, with a new winner chosen on a monthly basis.

The Sync went offline in 2002, following the collapse of the dot-com industry.
