= Autographer =

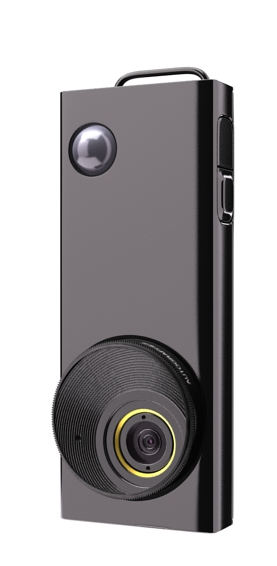

Overview
- Maker: OMG Life Ltd.
- Released: 30 July 2013

Lens
- Lens: Wide-angle

Sensor/medium
- Recording medium: Digital

Autographer is a hands-free, wearable digital camera developed by OMG Life. The camera uses five different sensors to determine when to automatically take photos and can take up to 2,000 pictures a day. It was released in July 2013 and is used primarily for lifelogging, entertainment and travel. As of 16 October 2016, OMG Life, the company behind Autographer discontinued operations.

== History ==
Autographer was developed by British company OMG Life, a wholly owned subsidiary of Oxford Metrics Group (OMG) plc, after licensing technology from Microsoft to create a medical memory aid called the Vicon Revue. The original product was released in October 2009 and was designed to capture the lives of patients with Alzheimer's disease and other memory problems, so that their doctors could assess how many of the events the patients recalled. OMG reinvented the device as a consumer product based on feedback from customers who were using the technology for entertainment purposes.

The media was first able to view prototypes for Autographer in March 2013, and journalists were invited to test the product at the London Zoo before its release. Autographer went on sale in July 2013 in the U.K. and Europe. It was initially sold on a dedicated Autographer website prior to its global release.

It was featured on The Jonathan Ross Show in January 2014. That same month, UK retailer Topman used Autographers during its London Collections: Men event. The Autographer images captured by its team were publicly viewable on the brand's digital magazine website, Topman Generation. The promotion also included a daily giveaway of an Autographer. Previously only available in black, the company added new color options to Autographer, including blue, green, and yellow, at the International CES in January 2014. In March 2014, it was announced that OMG Life had developed a waterproof kit for Autographer with waterproof case maker Aquapac, allowing the device to be used underwater to a depth of 30 feet for around 30 minutes.

As of 16 October 2016, OMG Life, the company behind Autographer discontinued operations.

== Design and features ==
Autographer is wearable technology that features a hands-free, lifelogging camera in a plastic casing meant to be worn around the neck or clipped to clothing. The camera is 5 megapixels and has a 136-degree wide-angle lens that was designed to resemble a human eye. Autographer is 90x36mm in size and weighs approximately 58 grams. Autographer has five sensors to detect changes in environment. These changes trigger the camera to take a photo. There is a sensor to determine when there is a shift in color, an infrared sensor for lighting changes, a thermometer that reacts to temperature, a magnetometer that perceives direction changes, and an accelerometer which detects motion. The device also uses GPS to track where photos were taken. Unlike traditional digital cameras, it does not have a screen to preview images. The images captured by Autographer can be managed through an iOS or Android app and desktop software. Bluetooth syncing allows users to automatically port images to their devices. Using the software and apps, users are able to edit and tag images, as well as view collected data about them, including GPS. Images can also be used to create animated GIFs and stop motion videos.

Autographer can take up to 2,000 photos a day and contains 8GB of memory that can store up to 16,000 images.

== Reception ==
Autographer has received positive reviews for its ease of use, and the quality of its app and software by both Forbes and The Guardian, while the ability to take unique candid shots has been praised by The Wall Street Journal and Building Design. It has been named a top travel gift by Escapism magazine and AOL UK Travel. The product has received criticism in the media for privacy issues, and OMG has worked to address these concerns by including an etiquette guide with Autographer. Both The Wall Street Journal and The Guardian noted that the device's design makes it conspicuous when taking photos and includes a highly visible lens cover. Other negative issues cited about Autographer include image quality and price.
