= MyLifeBits =

Life-logging experiment, 2001-

MyLifeBits was a life-logging experiment begun in 2001. It is a Microsoft Research project inspired by Vannevar Bush's hypothetical Memex computer system. The project includes full-text search, text and audio annotations, and hyperlinks. The "experimental subject" of the project was computer scientist Gordon Bell, and the project tried to collect a lifetime of storage on and about Bell. Jim Gemmell of Microsoft Research and Roger Lueder were the architects and creators of the system and its software.

MyLifeBits is an attempt to fulfill Vannevar Bush's vision of an automated store of the documents, pictures (including those taken automatically), and sounds an individual has experienced in his lifetime, to be accessed with speed and ease. For this, Bell digitized all documents he had read or produced, CDs, emails, and so on. He continued to do so through his death in 2024, gathering web pages browsed, phone and instant messaging conversations and the like more or less automatically. The book Total Recall describes the vision and implications for a personal, lifetime e-memory for recall, work, health, education, and immortality. In 2010, Total Recall was published in paperback. As of 2016, Bell was no longer using the wearable camera associated with the project. He described the rise of the smartphone as largely fulfilling Bush's vision of the Memex. Bell died in 2024.

== See also ==
- Dymaxion Chronofile
- Lifelog
- Microsoft SenseCam
