= Jennifer Ringley =

American former webcaster (born 1976)

- Born: Jennifer Kaye Ringley; August 10, 1976 (age 50); Harrisburg, Pennsylvania, U.S.
- Other name: Jennifer Johnson
- Years active: 1996–2003
- Known for: JenniCam; Lifecasting
- Website: jennicam.org at the Wayback Machine (archived December 27, 2003)

Jennifer Kaye Ringley (born August 10, 1976) is an Internet personality and former lifecaster. She is widely regarded as the first camgirl. She is known for creating the popular website JenniCam. Previously, live webcams transmitted static shots from cameras aimed through windows or at coffee pots. Ringley's innovation was simply to allow others to view her daily activities. She was the first web-based "lifecaster". She started as a 19-year-old college student at Dickinson College in 1996 and retired from lifecasting at the end of 2003.

In June 2008, CNET hailed JenniCam as one of the greatest defunct websites in history.

== JenniCam ==
Regarded by some as a conceptual artist, Ringley viewed her site as a straightforward document of her life. She did not wish to filter the events that were shown on her camera, so sometimes she was shown nude or engaging in sexual behavior, including sexual intercourse and masturbation. This was a new use of Internet technology at the time and some viewers were interested in its sociological implications while others watched it for sexual arousal. The JenniCam website coincided with a rise in surveillance as a feature of popular culture, exemplified by reality television programs such as Big Brother, and as a feature of contemporary art and new media art. From a sociological point of view, JenniCam was an important early example of how the internet could create a cyborg subject by integrating human images with the internet. As such, JenniCam set the stage for conversations regarding the relationship of technology and gender.

"It was basically a programming challenge to myself to see if I could set up the script that would take the pictures, upload them to this site,...just to get that happening automatically, and I shared it with a couple of friends, kinda 'look, I got this working.'"

Ringley's desire to maintain the purity of the cam-eye view of her life eventually created the need to establish that she was within her rights as an adult to broadcast such information, in the legal sense, and that it was not harmful to other adults. Unlike later for-profit webcam services, Ringley did not spend her day displaying her naked body and she spent much more time discussing her romantic life than she did her sex life. Ringley maintained her webcam site for seven years and eight months.

Sources stated that JenniCam received seven million visitors daily. Nate Lanxon of CNET said "remember this is 1996 and the Web as we know it now had barely lost its virginity, let alone given birth to the God-child we know as the modern Internet."

=== Origins ===
On April 3, 1996, during her junior year at Dickinson College in Carlisle, Pennsylvania, the 19-year-old Ringley installed a webcam in her college dorm room. On April 14, 1996, Ringley, raised as a nudist, started JenniCam, providing images from that cam on a website. The webpage would automatically refresh every three minutes with the most recent picture from the camera. Initially, anyone with Internet access could observe the often mundane events of Ringley's life; however, in June 1997, Ringley started charging viewers for full entry to her site. JenniCam was one of the first web sites that continuously and voluntarily surveyed a private life. Her first webcam contained only black-and-white images of her in the dorm room. JenniCam attracted up to four million views a day at its peak.

At times during the first couple of years of JenniCam, Ringley performed stripteases for the webcam. This continued until an incident occurred in 1997, wherein she was discovered by a group of hackers on Efnet who teased her for their own amusement. After she reacted humorously to their taunts, JenniCam was hacked, and Ringley received death threats. The hackers turned out to be approximately 100 people including a handful of teen pranksters, Ringley stopped doing stripteases after that.

Initially, the camera tended to be turned off during especially private moments, but eventually this custom was abandoned, and images were captured of Ringley engaging in sex.

Ringley graduated from Dickinson in 1997 with a Bachelor of Arts in Economics.

=== Washington D.C. ===
When Ringley moved to Washington, D.C. after graduating, she added webcams to cover the additional living space (four webcams captured images of her life), in both the office and bedroom. One camera – a Mac WebCam – captured the rooms at the clip of one photo per minute, even when vacant, and posted them to her web page. In the FAQ section of JenniCam.org, Ringley explained, "I don't feel I'm giving up my privacy. Just because people can see me doesn't mean it affects me – I'm still alone in my room, no matter what... I never feel a need to hide anything going on anyway."

She began charging for access to her site, allowing both paid and free access with the paid access updating the images more frequently than the free access. She added more pages to her website that included pictures of her cats and ferrets. Her site was doing well as she stayed home and listed her profession as "web designer" for her site.

As Ringley attracted a following both on and off the Internet, more than 100 media outlets from The Wall Street Journal to Modern Ferret ran features. Ringley owned several ferrets and Modern Ferret featured Jenni and one of her pets on the front cover. As an actress, she was cast in "Rear Windows '98," a 1998 episode of the TV series Diagnosis: Murder, portraying Joannecam, a fictionalized version of herself. She also hosted her own Internet talk show titled The Jennishow on The Sync, an early webcasting network based in Laurel, Maryland.

Ringley's standard of living improved with a larger apartment, expensive furniture, and several business trips to Amsterdam with her accountant. She claimed that the experience improved her self-image and self body image. Ringley began to take trips to visit other cam girls, including Ana Voog of Anacam.com.

At the height of her popularity, an estimated three to four million people watched JenniCam.org daily. She eventually purchased the domain jennicam.com as well. She appeared as a guest on the Late Show with David Letterman. At the end of the interview, and even after having been corrected once, Letterman plugged the site as Jennicam.net instead of the correct Jennicam.com (Ringley owned both Jennicam.com and Jennicam.org). People visiting the previously non-existent Jennicam.net found a pornographic site with the greeting, "Thanks Dave".

She also appeared on The Today Show and World News Tonight With Peter Jennings.

In 1999, clips from The Jennishow were included in the Museum of Modern Art's exhibition "Fame After Photography."

=== Sacramento ===
When Ringley moved to Sacramento, California, she documented the boxing of her possessions with free live streaming and full audio. Ringley received some criticism from fans when she became involved with Dex, a man who was the fiancé of a fellow webcammer and friend who helped her move to California.

She shut down her site on December 31, 2003, citing PayPal's new anti-nudity policy.

== After JenniCam ==
Since the end of 2003, Ringley has avoided having a presence on the Internet and on social media and tries to stay out of the public spotlight.

By 2007, Ringley had worked for a web developer after a brief stint as a case worker for a social services agency in Sacramento. Out of the public eye, she stated, "I really am enjoying my privacy now. I don't have a web page; I don't have a MySpace page. It's a completely different feeling, and I think I'm enjoying it."

In December 2014, Ringley spoke to the podcast Reply All about her experiences with JenniCam; the podcast noted that Jenny "is almost entirely absent from the Internet ... just the way she likes it."

In a 2016 interview with the BBC, Ringley described herself as a programmer in California and married to a man with the very common surname of Johnson.
