= Narrative Clip =

Narrative Clip & Narrative Clip 2
Overview
- Maker: Third Dot AB

Sensor/medium
- Maximum resolution: 5 megapixels (Narrative Clip) and 8 megapixels (Narrative Clip 2)

General
- Data port: USB 2.0
- Dimensions: 36×36×9 mm (1.42×1.42×0.35 in)

Footnotes
- getnarrative.com

The Narrative Clip is a small wearable lifelogging camera. Its development began in 2012 by the Swedish company Memoto after a successful crowd funding via Kickstarter. It can automatically take a picture every 30 seconds whilst being worn throughout the day, a practice known as "life-logging". At the end of the day the Clip uploads the photos and videos it made into the vendor's cloud service, where they are processed and organized into collections called Moments, available to the user through a web client or mobile apps. The Moments or individual photos and videos can be shared through other apps or through the company's own social network.

== History ==
The company made its first headlines after raising $500,000 from a Kickstarter campaign which closed in Nov, 2012. First units to backers were starting to be sent out during the autumn 2013. Originally named Memoto, the company then proceeded to change its name to Narrative and the product name to the Narrative Clip and kept on selling the first Narrative Clip on its website and through various retailers throughout the next 2 years.

The vastly improved Narrative Clip 2, featuring an improved camera, a modular attachment system, video capture, Bluetooth control and a built-in Wifi cloud uploader was unveiled at CES 2015 and started shipping in early 2016.

Due to cashflow problems and a broad decline in venture capital interest in wearables during 2016, the original company had to shut down late 2016. The assets and cloud service were acquired by a new company called Third Dot, run by some of the former founders and employees, which is keeping the service running for the existing users as well as maintaining sales of the Clip 2.

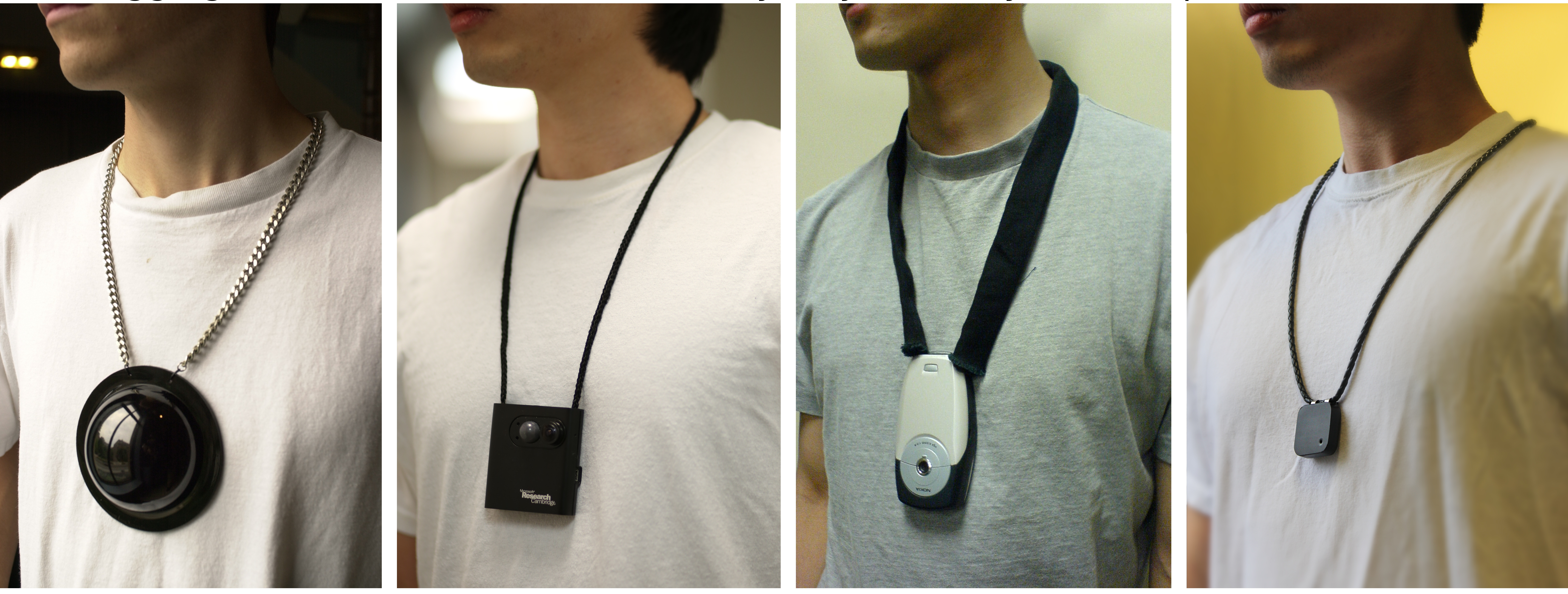
Narrative Clip, as worn, compared with its predecessors

== Press ==
The lifelogging idea and Narrative Clip captured the attention and imagination of magazines and newspapers worldwide, like Wall Street Journal, Der Spiegel, New York Times International Herald, TechCrunch, FastCompany, Huffington Post, Wired, TheNextWeb, Condé Nast Traveller, Engadget and The Verge.

Swedish National TV News reported on the original Memoto company and camera and that it would be released in spring 2013.

Some writers speculated about potential privacy concerns due to automatic photography, for example the Electronic Frontier Foundation (EFF).

== See also ==
- Wearable computing
- EyeTap
- Gordon Bell
- Steve Mann
- Sensecam
