= Sousveillance =

Recording of an activity by a participant

Camera A is engaged in surveillance, while the person wearing camera B on their head is engaged in sousveillance.

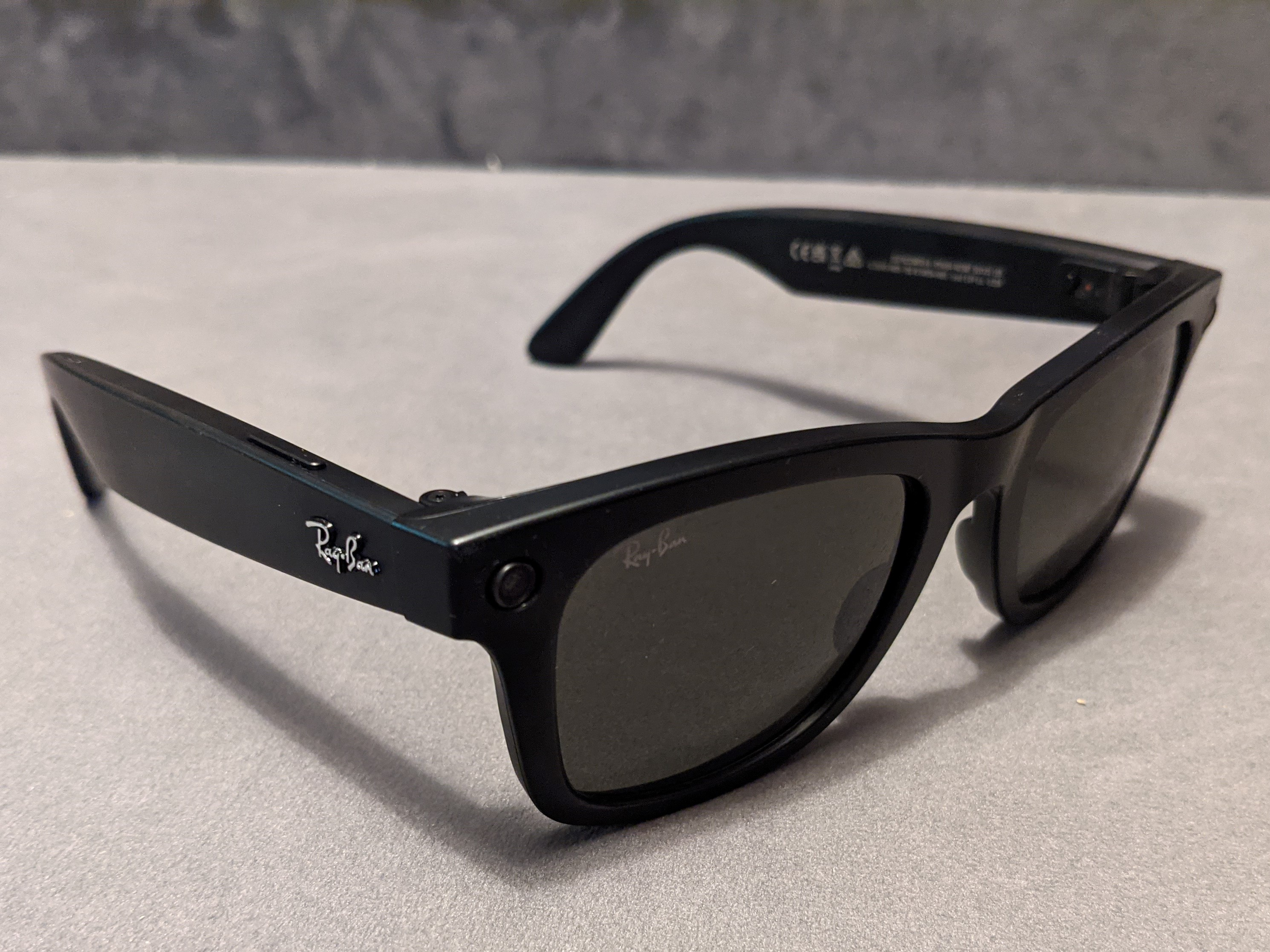
A pair of Ray-Ban Meta sunglasses which include two wearable cameras built into the frame

Sousveillance (/suːˈveɪləns/ soo-VAY-lənss) is the recording of an activity by a member of the public, rather than a person or organisation in authority, typically by way of small wearable or portable personal technologies.

OED (Oxford English Dictionary) defines sousveillance as "close observation or recording of authorities like the government or police by the public using personal devices like smartphones, as well as the general recording of everyday activities", citing a 2001 date.

The term, coined by Steve Mann, stems from the contrasting French words sur, meaning "above", and sous, meaning "below", i.e. "surveillance" denotes the "eye in the sky" watching from above, whereas "sousveillance" denotes bringing the means of observation down to human level, either physically (by mounting cameras on people rather than on buildings) or hierarchically (with ordinary people observing, rather than by higher authorities or by architectural means). (Note: Alternative definitions of both sur- and sous- veillance (the act of watching), in addition to the definition above, include: Surveillance is defined as cameras (or other sensors) affixed to property (real-estate, e.g. land, by way of posts or poles, or buildings), whereas sousveillance is defined as cameras (or other sensors) borne by people.; Surveillance is the veillance of the authority (i.e. the veillance that has the capacity to prohibit other veillances), whereas sousveillance is the veillance of plurality (i.e. "crowd veillance" or watching, sensing, or the like, done by non authorities)[4].; Sousveillance has also been described as "inverse surveillance", based on the word surveillance (from the French sur, "from above", and veiller, "to watch"), and substituting the prefix sous, "from below".)

Undersight (inverse oversight) is sousveillance at high-level, e.g. "citizen undersight" being reciprocal to a congressional oversight committee or the like.

Inverse surveillance is a subset of sousveillance with an emphasis on "watchful vigilance from underneath" and a form of surveillance inquiry or legal protection involving the recording, monitoring, study, or analysis of surveillance systems, proponents of surveillance, and possibly also recordings of authority figures. Inverse surveillance is typically undertaken by those who are subjected to surveillance, so it can be thought of as a form of ethnography or ethnomethodology (i.e. an analysis of the surveilled from the perspective of a participant in a society under surveillance). Sousveillance typically involves community-based recording from first person perspectives, without necessarily involving any specific political agenda, whereas inverse surveillance is a form of sousveillance that is typically directed at, or used to collect data to analyze or study, surveillance or its proponents (e.g., the actions of police or protestors at a protest rally).

== Inverse surveillance ==
Inverse surveillance is a type of sousveillance. The more general concept of sousveillance goes beyond just inverse surveillance and the associated twentieth-century political "us versus them" framework for citizens to photograph police, shoppers to photograph shopkeepers, or passengers to photograph taxicab drivers. Howard Rheingold commented in his book Smart Mobs that this is similar to the pedestrian−driver concept, i.e. these are roles that many of us take both sides on, from time to time. Many aspects of sousveillance were examined in the general category of "reciprocal accountability" in David Brin's 1997 non-fiction book The Transparent Society, and also in Brin's novels. The first International Workshop on Inverse Surveillance, IWIS, took place in 2004, chaired by Dr. Jim Gemmell, (MyLifeBits), Joi Ito, Anastasios Venetsanopoulos, and Steve Mann, among others.

Some research has explored why the perpetrators of surveillance are suspicious of sousveillance.

Copwatch is a network of American and Canadian volunteer organizations that "police the police." Copwatch groups usually engage in monitoring of the police, videotaping police activity, and educating the public about police misconduct. Fitwatch is a group that photograph Forward Intelligence Teams (police photographers) in the United Kingdom.

In 2008, Cambridge researchers (in the MESSAGE project) teamed with bicycle couriers to measure and transmit air pollution indicators as they travel the city.

In 2012 the Danish daily newspaper and online title Dagbladet Information crowdmapped the positions of surveillance cameras by encouraging readers to use a free Android and iOS app to photograph and geolocate CCTV cameras.

== Other types of sousveillance ==
"Hierarchical sousveillance" refers, for example, to citizens photographing the police, shoppers photographing shopkeepers, or taxicab passengers photographing cab drivers.

The unanticipated 2013 Russian meteor event was well documented from a dozen angles via the use of dashcam devices. Similarly, in February 2015, dashcams caught valuable footage of the crash of TransAsia Airways Flight GE235.

== Alibi sousveillance ==
Alibi sousveillance is a form of sousveillance activity aimed at generating an alibi as evidence to defend against allegations of wrongdoing.

Hasan Elahi, a University of Maryland professor, has produced a sousveillance for his entire life, after being detained at an airport because he was erroneously placed on the US terrorist watchlist. Some of his sousveillance activities include using his cell phone as a tracking device, and publicly posting debit card and other transactions that document his actions.

=== Police use ===
One specific use of alibi sousveillance is the growing trend of police officers wearing body cameras while on patrol. Well-publicized events involving police-citizen altercations (such as the case of Michael Brown in Ferguson, Missouri) have increased calls for police to wear body cameras and so capture evidence of the incidents, for their benefit and the criminal justice system as a whole. By having officers use sousveillance, police forces can generate hours of video evidence to be used in cases like that of Michael Brown, and the video evidence can act as an important alibi in the judicial proceedings in regards to who is truly at fault. Regardless of the outcome of such events, contemporaneous audio-video evidence can be extremely valuable in respect of compliance- and enforcement-related events.

Use of wearable cameras by police officers combined with video streaming and recording in an archive may produce a record of the interactions of the officer with civilians and criminals. Experiments with police use in Rialto, California from 2012 to 2013 resulted in a reduction of both complaints against officers and a reduction in the use of violence by officers. According to Jay Stanley, a senior policy analyst at the American Civil Liberties Union, "the public is shielded from police misconduct and the police officer from bogus complaints."

Because these body cameras are turned on for every encounter with the public, privacy issues have been brought up with specific emphasis on special victim cases such as rape or domestic violence. Concerns include both potential for video of victims to be released publicly and that being recorded may make victims uncomfortable revealing all the information that they know. There have been two case studies done in the United States that have revealed that police officers who have cameras have fewer encounters with citizens than officers who do not have cameras, due to fear of being reprimanded for committing a mistake.

== Sousveillance cultures ==
Prior to contemporary sousveillance cultures, Simone Browne (2015) used "dark sousveillance" to refer to the ways that enslaved Black Americans refashioned techniques and technologies to facilitate survival and escape. Browne (2015) notes how pranks and other performative practices and creative acts were used to resist enslavement from experiential insight.

In the era of web-based participatory media and convergence cultures, non-governmental and non-state actors, with their own virtual communities and networks that cut across national borders, use what Bakir (2010) calls the sousveillant assemblage to wield discursive power.

The sousveillant assemblage comprises Haggerty & Ericson's (2000) surveillant assemblage (or loosely linked, unstable, systems of data flows of people's activities, tracked by computers, and data-mined so that we are each reconfigured as (security) risks or (commercial) opportunities, but data-fattened by the proliferation of web-based participatory media and personal sousveillance that we willingly provide online). Verde Garrido (2015) has also explored Mann's concept of sousveillance and reinterpreted Michel Foucault's notion of parrhesia (i.e., confronting authority and power with the truth) to explain that in contemporary societies, which are global and digital, 'parrhesiastic sousveillance' allows to resist and contest social, economic, and political relations of power by means of technology.

These acts of resistance and contestation, in turn, enable civil societies to change old meanings and offer new ones, using a newborn digital agency to create new and contemporary politics of truth. Mann has long maintained that the 'informal nature of sousveillance, with its tendency to distribute recordings widely, will often expose inappropriate use to scrutiny, whereas the secret nature of surveillance will tend to prevent misuse from coming to light' (Mann, 2005, p. 641).

Just as Foucault's Panopticon operates through potential or implied surveillance, sousveillance might also operate through the credible threat of its existence. As the ubiquity and awareness of sousveillance widen, it is this that may most empower citizens – by making officials realise that their actions may, themselves, be monitored and exposed at any time.

There have not been many case studies that have taken place in implementing police body cameras. This means that police worn body cameras have not been proven as a definite method to solve the problem of police brutality. Studies have also shown that people, both policemen and civilians, act differently when they are aware that they are being surveilled on camera.

== Sousveillance efficiency or efficacy ==
For sousveillance to be effective other means are required, such as the use of social media to distribute video to a wide audience. Filming or streaming an abusive situation doesn't always lead to justice and punishment of the abuser, however. In 2014, Eric Garner was choked to death by a police officer in Staten Island after being arrested on suspicion of selling loose cigarettes. According to the MIT Technology Review:

Garner's death was documented by his friend Ramsey Orta, and the video was widely disseminated. Despite the video evidence, a grand jury declined to indict Garner's killer, leading to widespread outrage and protest. (In an ironic twist, the only person indicted in connection with Garner's death was Orta, who came under police scrutiny and was arrested on an "unrelated" weapons possession charge. Orta is now in prison in New York. Sousveillance is not without its costs.)

During French demonstrations against the "Loi Travail" in 2016, a Periscope stream showing authority forces, called abusive by one part of the demonstrators, was watched by 93,362 people. In January 2018, c-Now was tested in Nice by the mayor Christian Estrosi, sparking virulent public debates, with security advocates reporting spyware associated with the app.

== See also ==
- Body camera
- EyeTap
- Helmet camera
- Lifelogging
- Memoto
- Quantified self
- Quis custodiet ipsos custodes?
- Surveillance capitalism
- Copwatch
