= Dymaxion Chronofile =

Diary of Buckminster Fuller

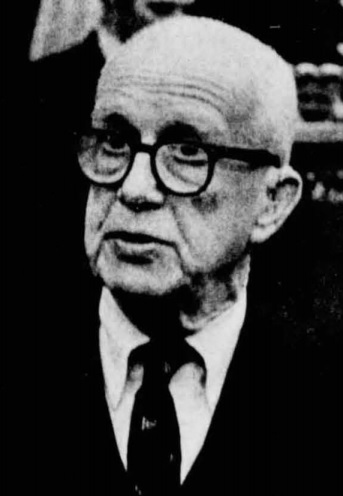
Fuller in 1972.

The Dymaxion Chronofile is Buckminster Fuller's attempt to document his life as completely as possible. He created a very large scrapbook in which he documented his life from 1917 to 1983. Fuller describes his Chronofile as contributing to "the scientific documentation of the emergent realization of the era of accelerating-acceleration of progressive ephemeralization".

== Makeup ==
The scrapbook contains copies of all correspondence, bills, notes, sketches, and clippings from newspapers. In 1960, the documents were presented by Fuller to Southern Illinois University's Morris Library where it was housed in their rare book archives. In 1999, the documents were moved to Stanford University. They are currently archived at Stanford University and are occasionally exhibited. Southern Illinois University still archive a collection of Fuller's 3D physical models. They were last displayed in the Hall of Presidents in 2023. The total collection is estimated to be 270 feet (80 m) worth of paper. This is said to be the most documented human life in history.

Fuller's Chronofile contains over 140,000 pieces of paper, as well as 64,000 feet of film, 1,500 hours of audio tape, and 300 hours of video recordings. The Chronofile is cross-referenced alphabetically using 13,500 5x8 inch index cards. Photos from Fuller's childhood from age four were added retrospectively.

== Usage ==
At a low point in his life at age 32, when considering suicide, Fuller reviewed his Chronofile to that date and concluded that he had been most effective when his efforts were on the behalf of others and resolved to focus his future work toward "all humanity".

Fuller's Dymaxion Chronofile inspired William McDonough to participate in his own "Living Archive".

If somebody kept a very accurate record of a human being, going through the era from the Gay '90s, from a very different kind of world through the turn of the century—as far into the twentieth century as you might live. I decided to make myself a good case history of such a human being and it meant that I could not be judge of what was valid to put in or not. I must put everything in, so I started a very rigorous record.

— Buckminster Fuller, Oregon Lecture #9, p.324, 12 July 1962

== See also ==
- Dymaxion car
- Dymaxion house
- Dymaxion map
- Lifelog
- MyLifeBits
- Robert Shields (diarist)
