= Cathal Gurrin =

Irish academic and "lifelogger"

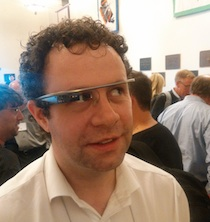
- Born: Dublin
- Occupations: Lifelogger and Associate Professor
- Known for: Extensive personal database of lifelog images and their interpretation

Cathal Gurrin is an Irish Professor and lifelogger. He is the Head of the Adapt Centre at Dublin City University, a Funded Investigator of the Insight Centre, and the director of the Human Media Archives research group. He was previously the deputy head of the School of Computing.

His interests include personal analytics and lifelogging. He publishes in information retrieval (IR) with a particular focus on how people access information from pervasive computing devices. He has captured a continuous personal digital memory since 2006 using a wearable camera and logged hundreds of millions of other sensor readings.

== Early life ==
Cathal attended primary school in Scoil Lorcáin, Kilbarrack, Dublin, and secondary school in St. Fintan's High School, Sutton. He graduated from Dublin City University with a PhD in developing web search engines, including the first Irish language search engine.

== Research ==
Gurrin has worn a wearable camera since 2006 which takes several still photographs every minute. He is likely the longest wearer of such a device in the world. He also records his location (using GPS) and various other sources of biometric data. Gurrin generated a database of over 18 million images, and produces about a terabyte of personal data a year. Gurrin and his researchers use information retrieval algorithms to segment his personal image archive into "events" such as eating, driving, etc. New events are recognised on a daily basis using machine learning. In an interview Gurrin said that "If I need to remember where I left my keys, or where I parked my car, or what wine I drank at an event two years ago... the answers should all be there." While searching by date and time is easy, more complex searches within images such as looking for brand names and objects with complex form factors, such as keys, is more difficult. One aim of Gurrin's research is to create search engines to allow complex searches of such image databases, and to develop assistive technology. He is the founder of the annual ACM Lifelog Search Challenge, which attracts a worldwide participant list annually.
