= St. Fintan's High School =

Secondary school for boys, Dublin, Ireland

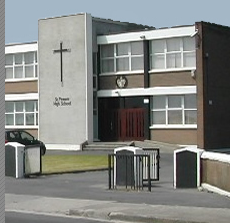
- School facade and main entrance

Location
- Dublin Road, Sutton, Dublin 13, D13 HN59; Ireland; 53.3893225°N 6.119252°W

Information
- Religious affiliation: Roman Catholic
- Established: 1943; 83 years ago
- Gender: Male
- Colours: Red, yellow and blue
- Website: stfintanshs.ie

St. Fintan's High School (Irish: Ard Scoil Naomh Fhionntán) is an all-boys Roman Catholic voluntary-aided secondary school located in Sutton, Dublin, Ireland.

== History ==
=== Background ===
A school originally opened at Bellevue House within the Burrow, Sutton, located on Station Road, between Sutton Cross and Howth village, with access to the beach. The school at Bellevue House, eventually St. Catherine's, comprised primary school facilities for boys and girls, and from 1924, a secondary school for girls, and was run by a Mrs Helen McAlister, a Mrs Watson and some Christian Brothers (it also held a vacation residence for the Christian Brothers during World War II). Mrs Watson died in 1940 and the whole school passed to the Christian Brothers, who closed the mixed school.

=== Foundation ===
St. Fintan's High School was founded at the Burrow Road premises in Sutton on 8 September 1943, as a fee-paying secondary day and "prep" school, with 48 students and 5 Christian Brother teachers. It was sponsored by local Catholic clergy and authorised by the Archbishop of Dublin. Fees were 6 to 12 guineas, depending on academic performance. Neighbouring premises were purchased in 1958, allowing provision of tennis courts, and also purchased, in 1959, was the Warren House on Dublin Road, which would in time become the school's home. In the early years, Gaelic sports were played on part of the Howth Estate's Deerpark lands.

=== State status and new location ===
Following reforms of the educational system in Ireland in the 1960s, St. Fintan's became a voluntary aided school. The school remains in private ownership within a Trust but the Government funds most running costs and the school conforms to state pupil entry provisions, prohibiting academic selection and fees. However, like most Irish voluntary aided schools, it asks parents and guardians in a position to do so to make a voluntary contribution towards capital projects and extra curricular activities. The post-primary section of the school began on Dublin Road in 1972, in a purpose-built premises built using donations of around 175,000 pounds, and with three dedicated science laboratories, and rooms for art, geography and languages. A large gym, with a performance stage and stage lighting, was added later, again funded entirely by donations. In 1980, the third Christian Brother principal took over and mandated a school uniform - previously the uniform was optional for secondary pupils and rarely worn. He also introduced basketball as a sport, with the school winning eight senior all-Ireland titles during the 1980s and early 1990s.

Though founded by the Christian Brothers, St. Fintan's has had a fully lay staff for more than a decade. It was transferred to and remains a constituent of the Edmund Rice Schools Trust.

=== Past principals ===
The first head was Brother P.J. Walsh. He was followed by Brother Purcell, and then, in 1980, by Br John Bourke, the last principal to be a member of the religious. Br Bourke was succeeded by Bill McCartney from Swords. Later principals were two long-serving members of staff, Richard (Dick) Fogarty and Raymond (Ray) Quinn , followed, in the 2010–2011 school year, by Mary Fox and Cathy Mullen since 2020.

== Today ==
The school, draws pupils primarily from Sutton, Baldoyle, Bayside and Howth, Kilbarrack, Raheny, Portmarnock, Malahide and Clontarf. It is oversubscribed with annual applications, and has a student population of over 700. While St. Fintan's has in the past had admissions exams, it moved to a policy with provision for family connections, then local schooling or residence, then schooling or residence within the Howth Deanery, plus one school in Clontarf. The annual Student of the Year Award, for the top student overall in the final year, was originally, presented by the first Past Pupils' Union, in later years selected by the staff, and presented by the principal at a general assembly of the school. The school receives its main funding from the Department of Education and Skills, but also collects, where parents / guardians can afford it, a voluntary financial contribution, and a suggested fee towards photocopying and resource materials, IT, pupil insurance and the school journal.

== Governance ==
The school is overseen by a Board of Management, and ultimately by the Edmund Rice Schools Trust, which also holds the premises in trust.

There is a Parents Council, affiliated to the National Parents Council - Post Primary. There is also a Students' Council, with delegates from every class in the school, and a position of Head Boy, along with a deputy and a number of prefects, was introduced in the 2010s.

== Staff ==
St. Fintan's has nearly 50 teaching staff, led by a principal and two deputy principals. They expanded from one to two deputy principals in 2016 as the student body grew.

== Facilities ==
The school buildings comprise two blocks, one of which also holds offices and the canteen, and the other more classrooms and the laboratories. It has 21 regular classrooms, as well as dedicated physics, chemistry and biology laboratories, IT and technology rooms, staff rooms, and a library.

The school also has a tarmac-surfaced yard, a large gym, an astro-turf pitch, and a substantial sports field with changing rooms.

== Sport ==
As of 2025, St Fintan's participates in up to 12 sports at a competitive level.

The Senior Rugby Team often qualifies as one of 16 teams entered into the Leinster Schools Rugby Senior Cup, qualifying on six occasions (2017, 2018, 2022, 2024, 2025, and 2026). In 2025, they reached the semi-finals of the competition, becoming the first non-fee paying school to do so since 1993. They also became just the second non-fee paying school to win the Leinster Schools Vinnie Murray Cup in 2024.

The Junior Rugby team has qualified for the Leinster Schools Junior Cup on two occasions (2022 and 2023), reaching the semi-finals in 2022 before a narrow defeat to Cistercian College Roscrea. In both years, St. Fintan's won the Leinster Schools Fr. Godfrey Cup, becoming the first school to retain this trophy and the first school to play in three consecutive finals (2021 - 2023).

The Senior Hurling team reached the Division "C" All Ireland final in 2016 and won the Dublin "A" final in 2022, 2024,2025 and 2026. Other sports in which the school competes at a high level include Gaelic football, tennis, basketball, sailing and ultimate frisbee. It is the leading school in Ireland at squash with students having won the schools boys national championship at all three age groups - U15, U17 and U19 - for three years in a row. The school won the national Sports School of the Year Award in 2014, sponsored by the Herald newspaper.

== Alumni ==
=== Notable Past pupils ===
- Jack Aungier - Connacht Rugby player
- Roddy Doyle - Author of The Commitments
- Leo J. Enright - broadcaster
- Brian Fenton - Dublin GAA player
- Cathal Gurrin - lifelogger and researcher
- Will Hondermarck – professional footballer
- Brian Howard (Gaelic footballer) - Dublin GAA player
- Ronan Keating - singer and member of the band Boyzone
- Mícheál Mac Donncha - former Lord Mayor of Dublin
- Steve Wickham - musician

== Popular culture ==
The school was the location of the first paid performance by the Irish rock band U2, known then as "Feedback", in April 1977.

In 2004, there was controversy when Brian McFadden - formerly of the group Westlife - released a song "Irish Son" which contained lyrics critical of corporal punishment at schools in Dublin during his childhood. The accompanying video had a scene of a taxi pulling up to "St. Fintan's School for Boys". McFadden never attended the school and after representations from the School to his recording company, Sony BMG, they re-edited the video to remove the reference.

St. Fintan's was also used as the school attended by the sisters in the 2024 Ariane Labed directed film "September Says".
