= Four Eyed Monsters =

- Directed by: Susan Buice; Arin Crumley
- Written by: Susan Buice; Arin Crumley
- Starring: Susan Buice; Arin Crumley
- Edited by: Susan Buice; Arin Crumley
- Music by: Andrew A. Peterson
- Distributed by: self-distributed
- Release dates: January 23, 2005 (Slamdance Film Festival); December 1, 2006 (United States)
- Running time: 70 minutes
- Country: United States
- Language: English
- Box office: $927

Four Eyed Monsters, an American 2005 film by Susan Buice and Arin Crumley. It roughly follows Buice and Crumley's real life relationship; the couple initially communicated only through artistic means inspired to continue their online digital non-verbal courtship in the analog world. The film is a very low-budget digital video production but has gained attention for its use of various web-related strategies in distribution and in its ability to build an audience through the use of online resources, a growing trend among contemporary American indie filmmakers. In 2007 it became the first ever feature film to be released on YouTube. In 2010 the film was released on VODO where it was placed under a Creative Commons Attribution-Sharealike license allowing audience members to redistribute or even alter it as they wish. Since then a number of screenings have been utilized taking advantage of this open license.

The film was shot on MiniDV using the Panasonic AG-DVX100 mostly in Brooklyn and Manhattan, New York, with supplementary shooting in Framingham, Massachusetts and Johnson, Vermont. It was edited on Apple's Final Cut Pro editing software. It debuted on the festival circuit in January 2005 at the Slamdance Film Festival where it was well received.

At first the filmmakers hoped to obtain a conventional deal for theatrical distribution on the basis of its success at Slamdance, but nothing was forthcoming. This is when they decided to release what eventually grew into a two-season 13 episode online series about the journey of creating the film. This attention eventually grabbed the attention of IFC TV who went on to air the film, release in iTunes and sell DVDs through Borders bookstore. IFC then stopped selling the film and for a period of time it was only available in Canada through Films We Like and UK via DOG WOOF. IN 2009 the film was relaunched on YouTube and in 2010 released on VODO.

== Plot ==
A shy videographer (Arin) and an uninspired artist working as a waitress (Susan) meet on the Internet and spark a relationship. Fed up with the usual dating game, the two decide to not communicate verbally, only through artistic means to see if they can make it work.

== Video podcast ==
Out of their creation of the film, the Four Eyed Monsters podcast was born. It played on various places on the web, and episodes 9-13 debuted on IFC as a featured web series. Episode 3.5 featured a cameo by Chicago filmmaker Mike Krumlauf.

== Awards ==
- Best New Directors - 2005 Brooklyn International Film Festival (Winner)
- Chameleon Award - 2005 Brooklyn International Film Festival
- Student Jury Award - 2005 Newport International Film Festival
- Special Audience Award - 2005 South by Southwest Film Festival (Runner up)
- Special Mention - 2005 Sidewalk Moving Picture Festival
- Nominated for Best Cinematography - 2007 Independent Spirit Awards
- Nominated for John Cassavetes Award - 2007 Independent Spirit Awards
- Winner of the Undiscovered Gems 2006 Showcase - Awarded 50K towards further theatrical release and 50K for a TV deal with Sundance Channel still under negotiation.
