= Gordon Bell =

American computer engineer (1934–2024)

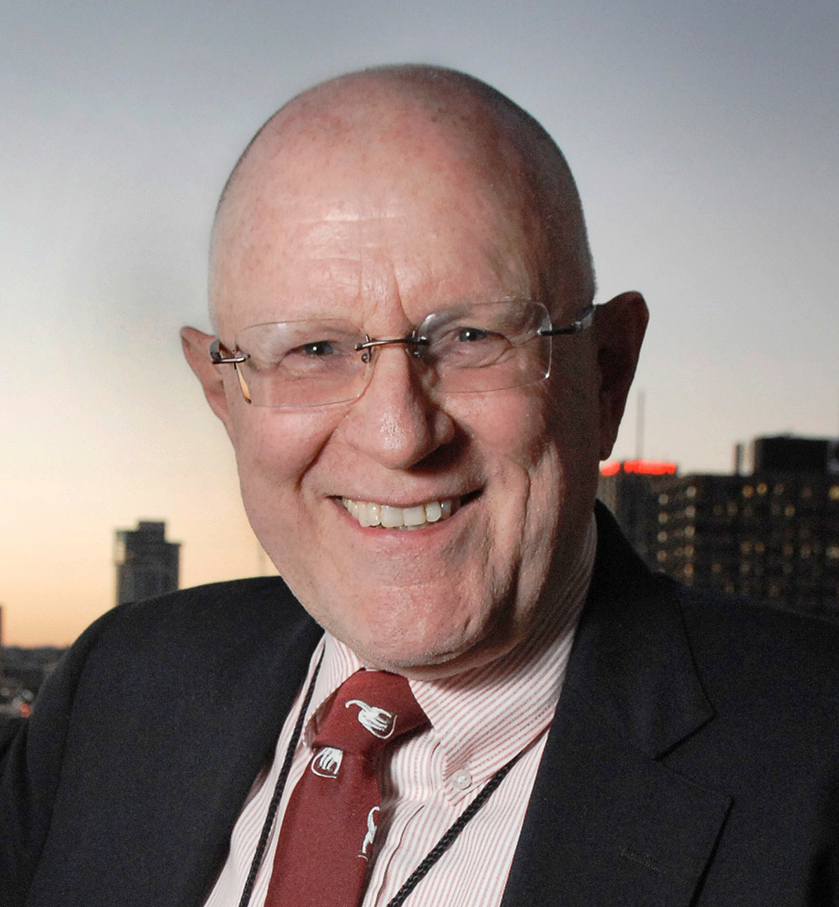
- Born: August 19, 1934; Kirksville, Missouri, U.S.
- Died: May 17, 2024 (aged 89); Coronado, California, U.S.
- Education: MIT (BS 1956, MS 1957)
- Known for: Computer architecture
- Spouse: Gwen Bell
- Awards: National Medal of Technology; IEEE John von Neumann Medal; NAE Member; NAS Member; AAAS Fellow; IEEE Fellow; ACM Fellow; CHM Fellow
- Scientific career
- Workplaces: DEC, Microsoft
- Website: gordonbell.azurewebsites.net

Chester Gordon Bell (August 19, 1934 – May 17, 2024) was an American electrical engineer and manager. An early employee of Digital Equipment Corporation (DEC), from 1960 to 1966, Bell designed several of their PDP machines and later served as the company's Vice President of Engineering from 1972 to 1983, overseeing development of the VAX computer systems. Bell's later career included roles as an entrepreneur, investor, founding Assistant Director of NSF's Computing and Information Science and Engineering Directorate from 1986 to 1987, and researcher emeritus at Microsoft Research from 1995 to 2015.

== Early life and education ==
Gordon Bell was born in Kirksville, Missouri. He grew up helping with the family business, Bell Electric, repairing appliances and wiring homes.

Bell received a BS (1956), and MS (1957) in electrical engineering from MIT. He then went to the New South Wales University of Technology (now UNSW) in Australia on a Fulbright Scholarship in 1957–58, where he taught classes on computer design, programmed one of the first computers to arrive in Australia (called UTECOM, an English Electric DEUCE), and published his first academic paper. Returning to the US, he worked in the MIT Speech Computation Laboratory under Professor Ken Stevens, where he wrote the first analysis by synthesis program.

== Career ==
=== Digital Equipment Corporation ===
The DEC founders Ken Olsen and Harlan Anderson recruited him for their new company in 1960, where he designed the I/O subsystem of the PDP-1, including the first UART. Bell was the architect of the PDP-4, and PDP-6. Other architectural contributions were to the PDP-5 and PDP-11 Unibus and General Registers architecture.

After DEC, Bell went to Carnegie Mellon University in 1966 to teach computer science. He returned to DEC in 1972 as vice-president of engineering, where he was in charge of the successful VAX computer.

=== Entrepreneur and policy advisor ===
Bell reportedly later came to find work at DEC stressful, and suffered a heart attack in March 1983. After he recovered and shortly after he returned to work, he resigned from the company in the summer. Afterwards, he founded Encore Computer, one of the first shared memory, multiple-microprocessor computers to use the snooping cache structure.

During the 1980s he became involved with public policy, becoming the first and founding Assistant Director of the CISE Directorate of the NSF, and led the cross-agency group that specified the NREN.

Bell also established the ACM Gordon Bell Prize (administered by the ACM and IEEE) in 1987 to encourage development in parallel processing. The first Gordon Bell Prize was won by researchers at the Parallel Processing Division of Sandia National Laboratory for work done on the 1000-processor nCUBE 10 hypercube.

He was a founding member of Ardent Computer in 1986, becoming VP of R&D in 1988, and remained until it merged with Stellar in 1989, to become Stardent Computer.

=== Microsoft Research ===
Between 1991 and 1995, Bell advised Microsoft in its efforts to start a research group, then joined it full-time in August 1995, studying telepresence and related ideas. He was the experiment subject for the MyLifeBits project, an experiment in life-logging (not the same as life-blogging). This was an attempt to fulfill Vannevar Bush's vision of an automated store of the documents, pictures (including those taken automatically), and sounds an individual has experienced in his lifetime, to be accessed with speed and ease. For this, Bell digitized all documents he has read or produced, CDs, emails, and so on.

== Death ==
Bell died of aspiration pneumonia at his home in Coronado, California, on May 17, 2024. He was 89.

== Bell's law of computer classes ==
Bell's law of computer classes was first described in 1972 with the emergence of a new, lower priced microcomputer class based on the microprocessor. Established market class computers are introduced at a constant price with increasing functionality and performance. Technology advances in semiconductors, storage, interfaces and networks enable a new computer class (platform) to form about every decade to serve a new need. Each new usually lower priced class is maintained as a quasi independent industry (market). Classes include: mainframes (1960s), minicomputers (1970s), networked workstations and personal computers (1980s), browser-web-server structure (1990s), palmtop computing (1995), web services (2000s), convergence of cell phones and computers (2003), and Wireless Sensor Networks aka motes (2004). Bell predicted that home and body area networks would form by 2010.

== Legacy and honors ==
Bell has been described as "a giant in the computer industry", "an architect of our digital age", and "father of the minicomputer".

Bell was elected a member of the National Academy of Engineering in 1977 for contributions to the architecture of minicomputers. He is also a Fellow of the American Academy of Arts and Sciences (1994), American Association for the Advancement of Science (1983), Association for Computing Machinery (1994), IEEE (1974), and member of the National Academy of Sciences (2007), and Fellow of the Australian Academy of Technological Sciences and Engineering (2009).

He is also a member of the advisory board of TTI/Vanguard and a former member of the Sector Advisory Committee of Australia's Information and Communication Technology Division of the Commonwealth Scientific and Industrial Research Organisation.

Bell was the first recipient of the IEEE John von Neumann Medal, in 1992. His other awards include Fellow of the Computer History Museum, the AeA Inventor Award, the Vladimir Karapetoff Outstanding Technical Achievement Award of Eta Kappa Nu, and the 1991 National Medal of Technology by President George H. W. Bush. He was also named an Eta Kappa Nu Eminent Member in 2007.

In 1993, Worcester Polytechnic Institute awarded Bell an Honorary Doctor of Engineering, and in 2010, Bell received an honorary Doctor of Science and Technology degree from Carnegie Mellon University. The latter award referred to him as "the father of the minicomputer".

Bell co-founded The Computer Museum in Boston, Massachusetts, with his wife Gwen Bell in 1979. He was a founding board member of its successor, the Computer History Museum located in Mountain View, California. In 2003, he was made a Fellow of the Museum "for his key role in the minicomputer revolution, and for contributions as a computer architect and entrepreneur". The story of the museum's evolution beginning in the early 1970s with Ken Olsen at Digital Equipment Corporation is described in the Microsoft Technical Report MSR-TR-2011-44, "Out of a Closet: The Early Years of The Computer [x]* Museum". A timeline of computing historical machines, events, and people is given on his website. It covers from prehistoric times to the present.

== Books ==
- (with Allen Newell) Computer Structures: Readings and Examples (1971, ISBN 0-07-004357-4)
- (with C. Mudge and J. McNamara) Computer Engineering (1978, ISBN 0-932376-00-2)
- (with Dan Siewiorek and Allen Newell) Computer Structures: Principles and Examples (1982, ISBN 0-07-057302-6)
- (with J. McNamara) High Tech Ventures: The Guide for Entrepreneurial Success (1991, ISBN 0-201-56321-5)
- (with Jim Gemmell) Total Recall: How the E-Memory Revolution will Change Everything (2009, ISBN 978-0-525-95134-6)
- (with Jim Gemmell) Your Life Uploaded: The Digital Way to Better Memory, Health, and Productivity (2010, ISBN 978-0-452-29656-5) (a retitled edition of Total Recall)

== Articles ==
- Bell, Gordon, and Jim Gray. "Digital immortality." Communications of the ACM 44.3 (2001): 28–31. Note: the article was also published on the official website of Microsoft Research.

== See also ==
- MyLifeBits
- Microsoft SenseCam
- Lifelog
