= DotComGuy =

American Internet celebrity

DotComGuy (born Mitch Maddox) is a computer systems manager and former Internet personality. In a promotion for several Internet companies, he changed his name to DotComGuy. He lived the entire year of 2000 in his house in Dallas, Texas, buying all food and other necessities online. Video from the house was streamed on the dotcomguy.com website. Sponsors of the project included United Parcel Service, 3Com, Network Solutions, Piper Jaffray, Travelocity and an online grocer (now called Edwardo's). The site has since been acquired and offers an on-site technical assistance service today.

Maddox is now a technology evangelist for UKG. At the end of each year he holds a day-long DotComGuy reunion on Internet relay chat.
