= DKAN =

DKAN may refer to:

- DKAN, a Drupal-based open data portal inspired by CKAN
- D. Kan., an abbreviation for the United States District Court for the District of Kansas

== See also ==
- Dan Kan (executive) (fl. 2010s), American technology executive
- Daniel Kan (1927–2013), Dutch mathematician
- Derek Kan (甘達慶; born 1978), American business executive and government official
- Direction des Constructions et Armes Navales (DCAN), predecessor company of Naval Group
- Decan (disambiguation)
