= Buick Envision =

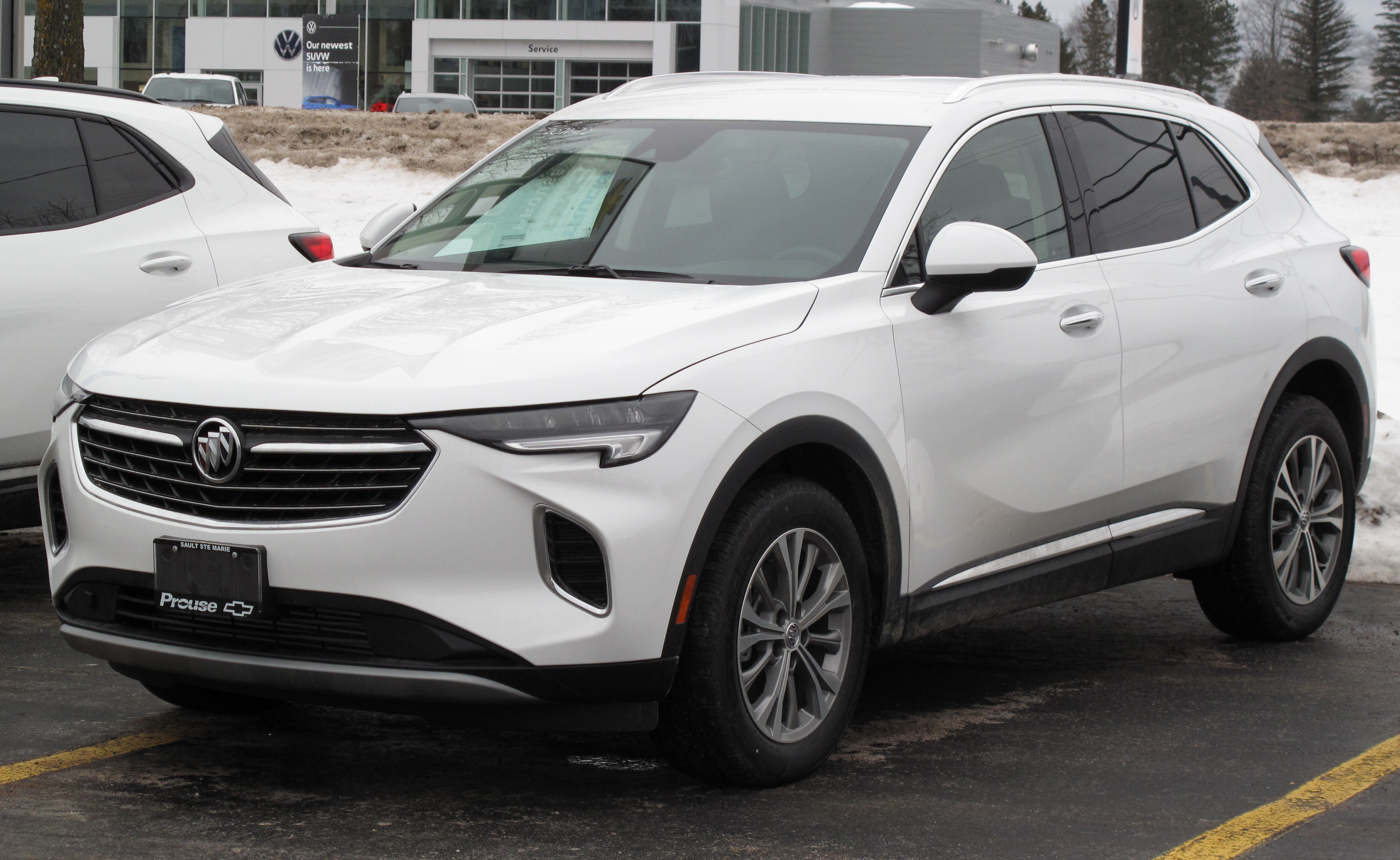

Overview
- Manufacturer: Buick (General Motors)
- Production: 2014–present
- Model years: 2016–present (North America)
- Assembly: China: Yantai (SAIC-GM)

Body and chassis
- Class: Compact crossover SUV
- Body style: 5-door SUV
- Layout: Front-engine, front-wheel-drive or all-wheel-drive

The Buick Envision is a compact crossover SUV manufactured by General Motors and marketed under the Buick brand since 2014. It is exclusively manufactured in China by the SAIC-GM joint venture, supplying the Chinese and North American markets.

== Concept ==
The Envision was first introduced in 2011 as a design concept. It was a small crossover with two large scissor doors opening upward. The concept was a plug-in hybrid with advanced technology such as a solar roof and heads-up display. The waterfall grille made it to the production version of the Envision.

== First generation (2014) ==
First generation
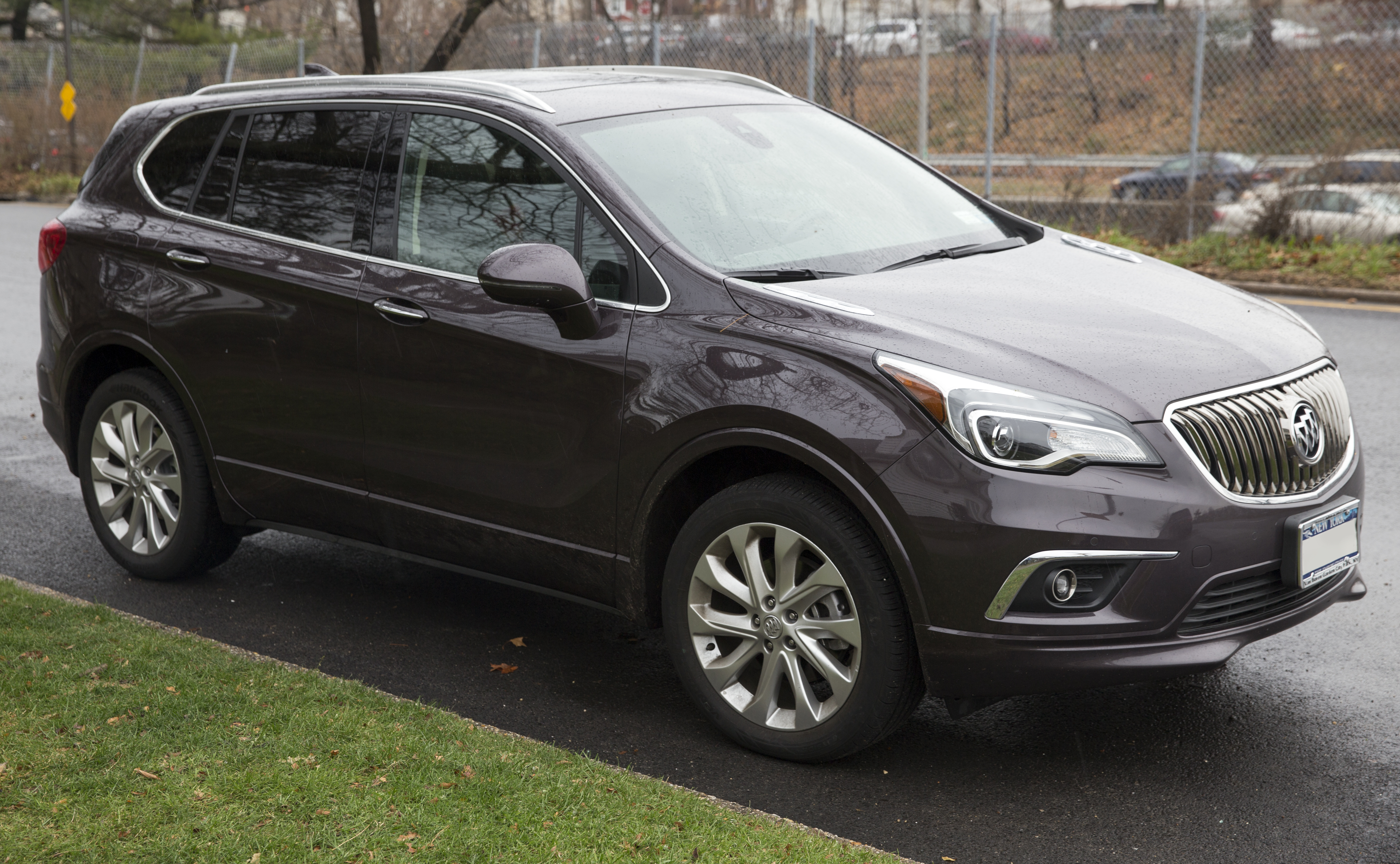
- 2016 Buick Envision (pre-facelift; US model)

Overview
- Production: 2014–2023
- Model years: 2014–2023 (China); 2016–2020 (North America)
- Designer: Jeasoo Kim

Body and chassis
- Platform: GM D2XX
- Related: Chevrolet Equinox; GMC Terrain

Powertrain
- Engine: Gasoline: 1.5 L LFV turbo I4 (China); 2.0 L LTG turbo I4; 2.5 L LCV I4
- Transmission: 7-speed DCT; 6-speed automatic; 9-speed automatic (2.0 L)

Dimensions
- Wheelbase: 2,750 mm (108.3 in)
- Length: 4,667 mm (183.7 in)
- Width: 1,804 mm (71.0 in)
- Height: 1,660 mm (65.4 in)
- Curb weight: 1,835 kg (4,045 lb)

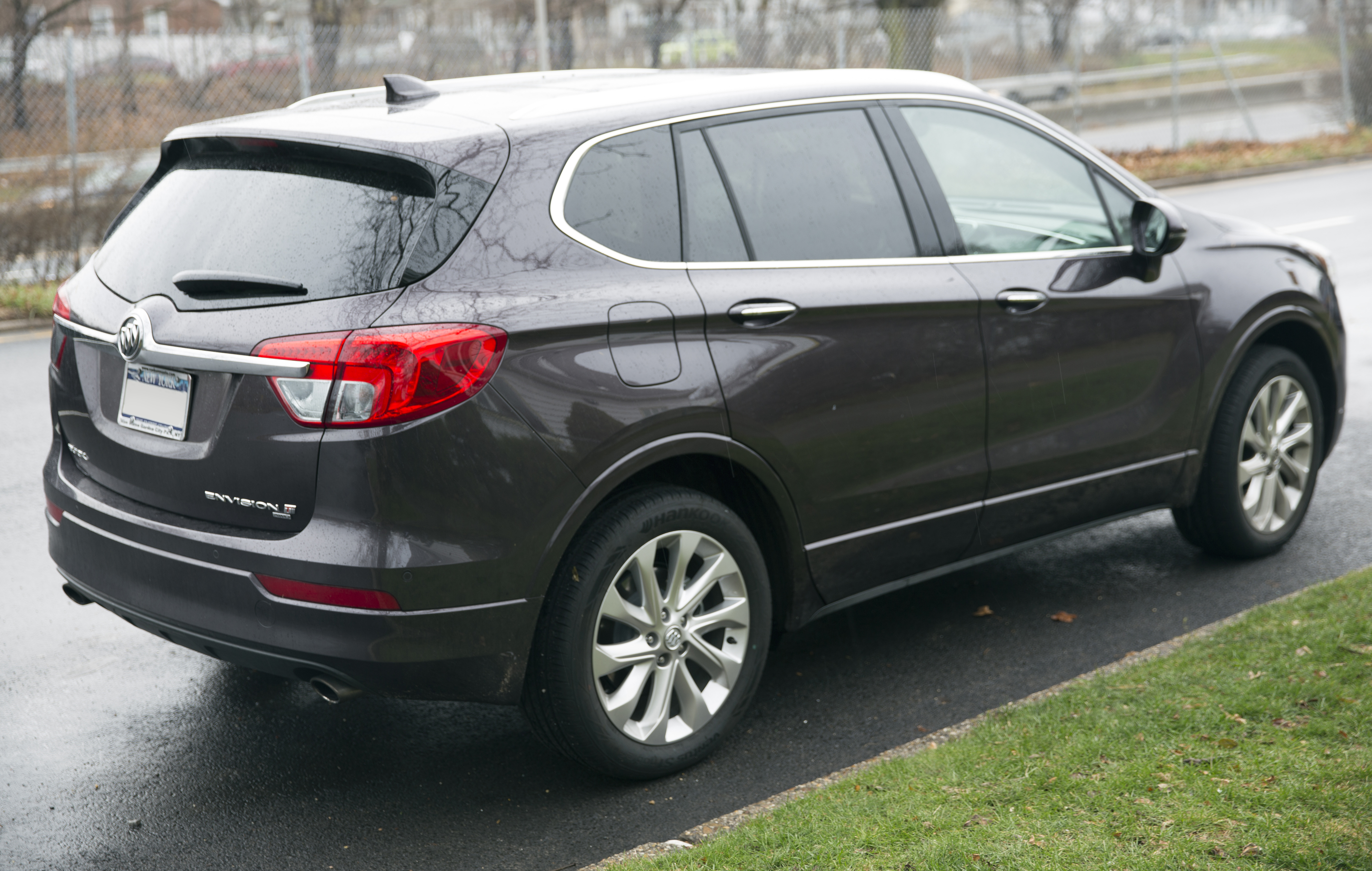
Buick Envision, pre-facelift (rear view)

The Envision was first introduced in China in August 2014, also known by its Chinese name, “Ang Ke Wei” (昂科威; Áng kē wēi). It went on sale in China on October 20.

The Envision debuted in the U.S. at the North American International Auto Show on January 11, 2016, sharing the segment with a second generation GMC Terrain and the Chevrolet Equinox. It went on sale in the United States in the summer of 2016, making it the first Chinese-built GM vehicle to be sold in America. It was initially offered with all-wheel drive, and subsequently with optional front-wheel drive for model year 2017.

The North American version of the Envision features two powertrains: a 2.5-liter four-cylinder with 197 hp (147 kW) and 192 lb⋅ft (260 N⋅m) torque, and a turbo-charged 2-liter four-cylinder engine SAE certified at 252 hp (188 kW) and 260 lb⋅ft (353 N⋅m) torque. Both were initially paired with a third-generation six-speed transmission. For the 2016 model year, the Envision was only available in Premium I and Premium II trim levels, with the 2.0L turbo engine, seven active safety technologies, and OnStar/Intellilink connectivity. The trim levels expanded to five for the 2017 model year.

In addition to the larger engines offered in North America, Chinese buyers also have the option of a turbocharged 1.5-liter unit.

Trim levels for the first generation Envision were known as the 20T and 28T.

=== 2019 facelift ===
The 2019 Envision debuted in late 2017 in China, and in 2018 for the North American market. It features revised rear styling and tail lights, stop/start calibration, and new seating design. The transmission for the 2.0-litre turbo engine was upgraded to a 9-speed automatic.

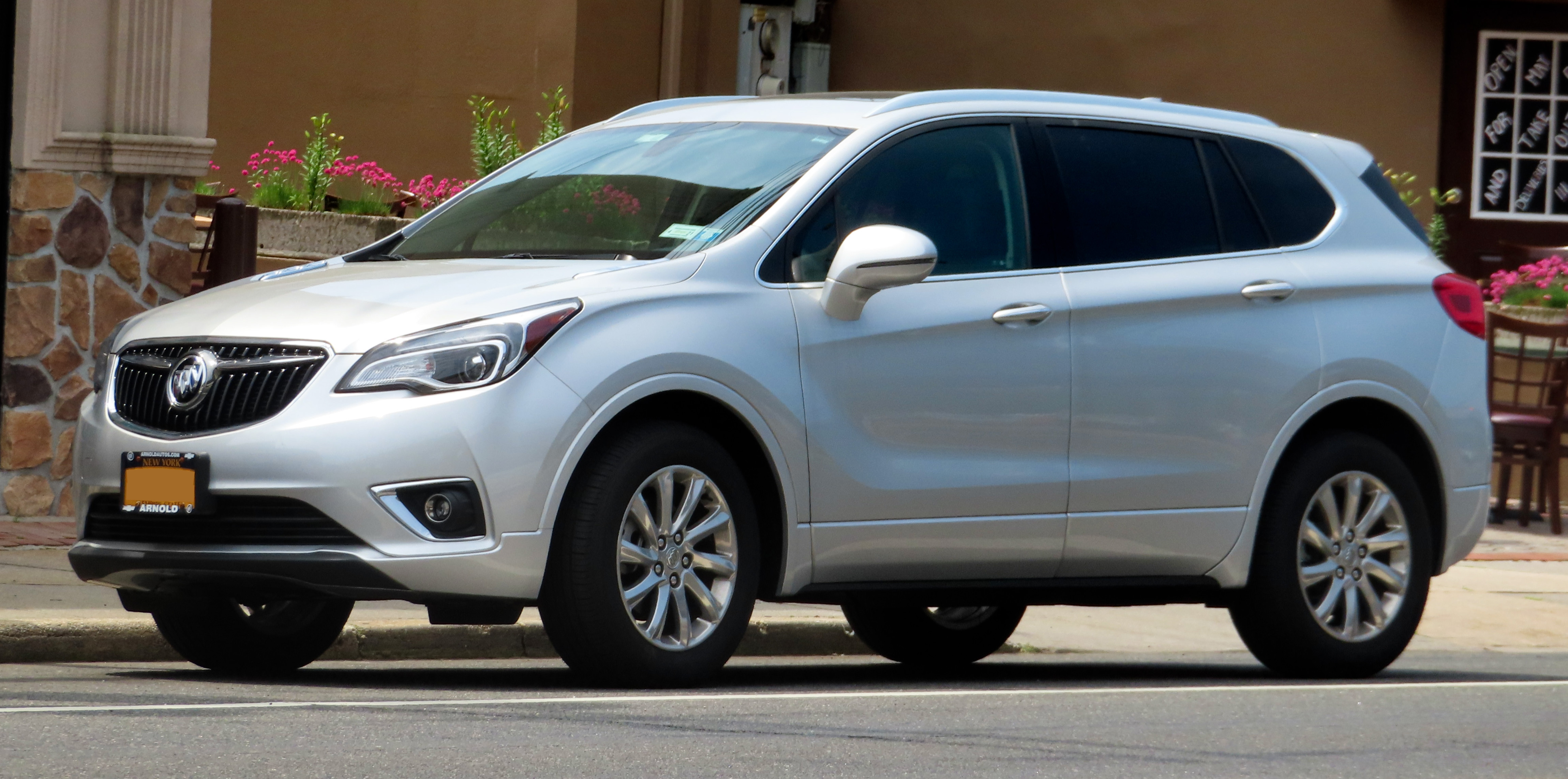
2019 Buick Envision (facelift)

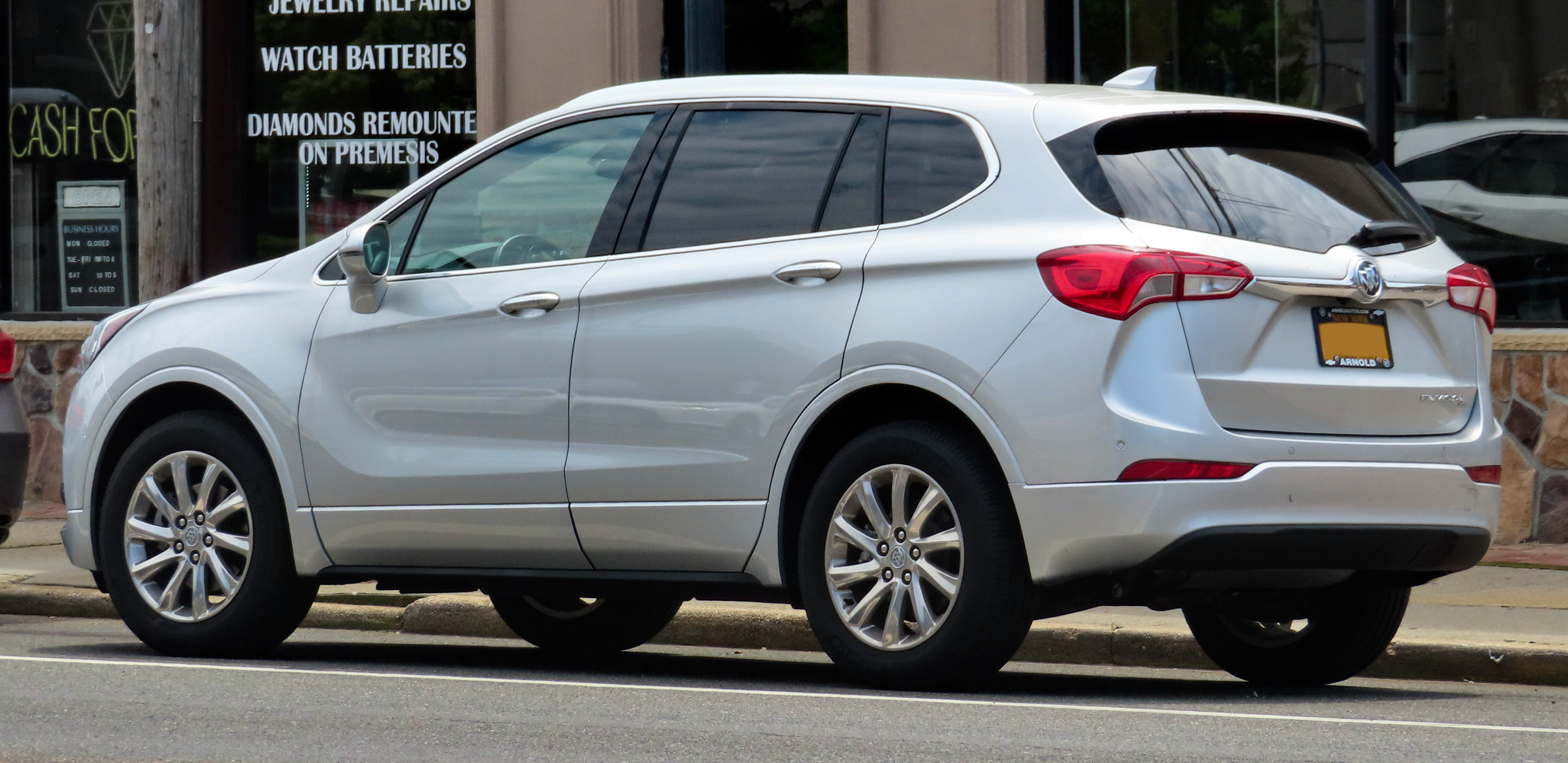
2019 Buick Envision (facelift)

=== 2020 facelift ===
The 2020 Envision facelift debuted in early 2020 in China, and would be sold alongside the second generation models called the Envision S in China. It features revised front and rear end styling.

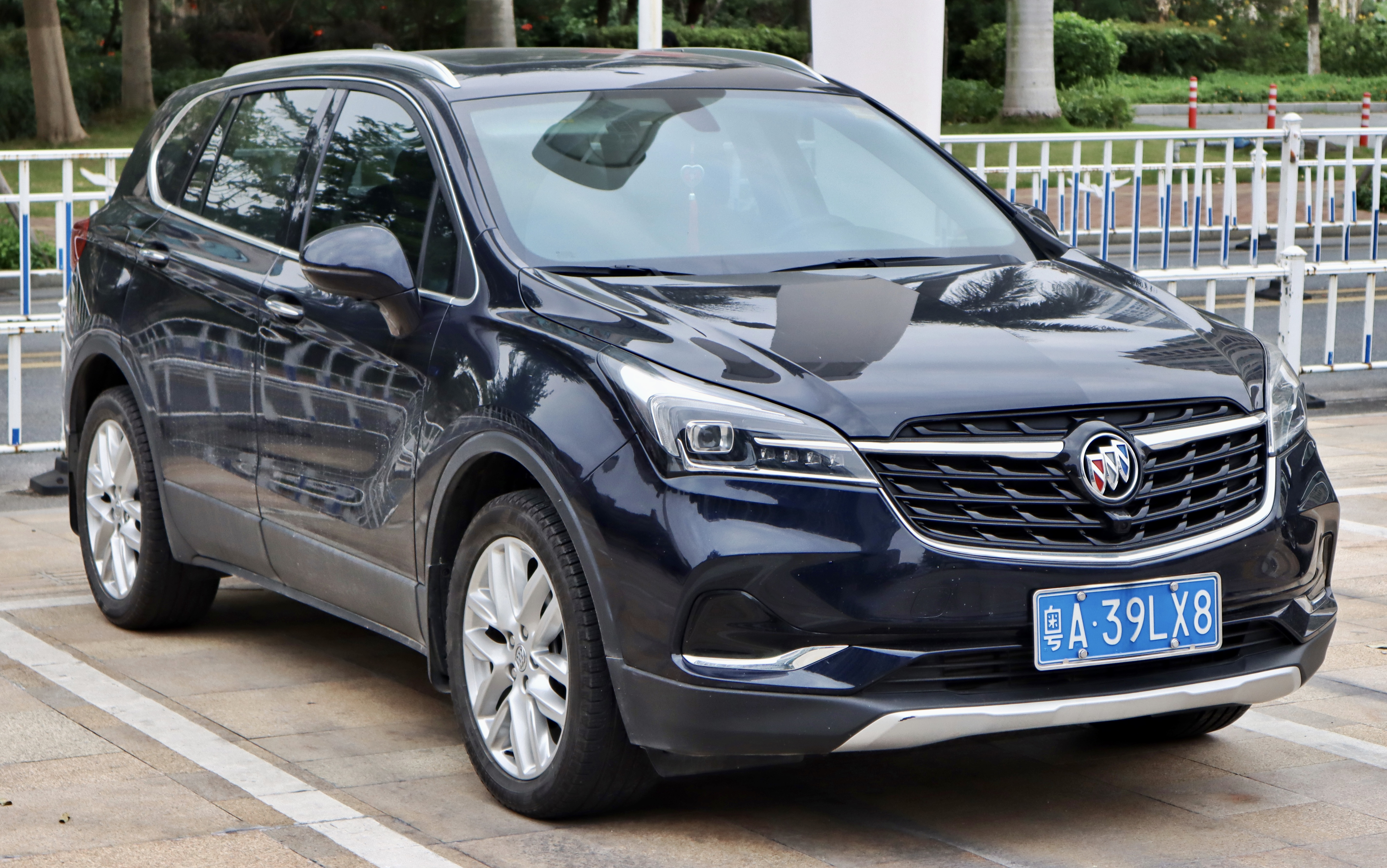
2020 Buick Envision (China, facelift)

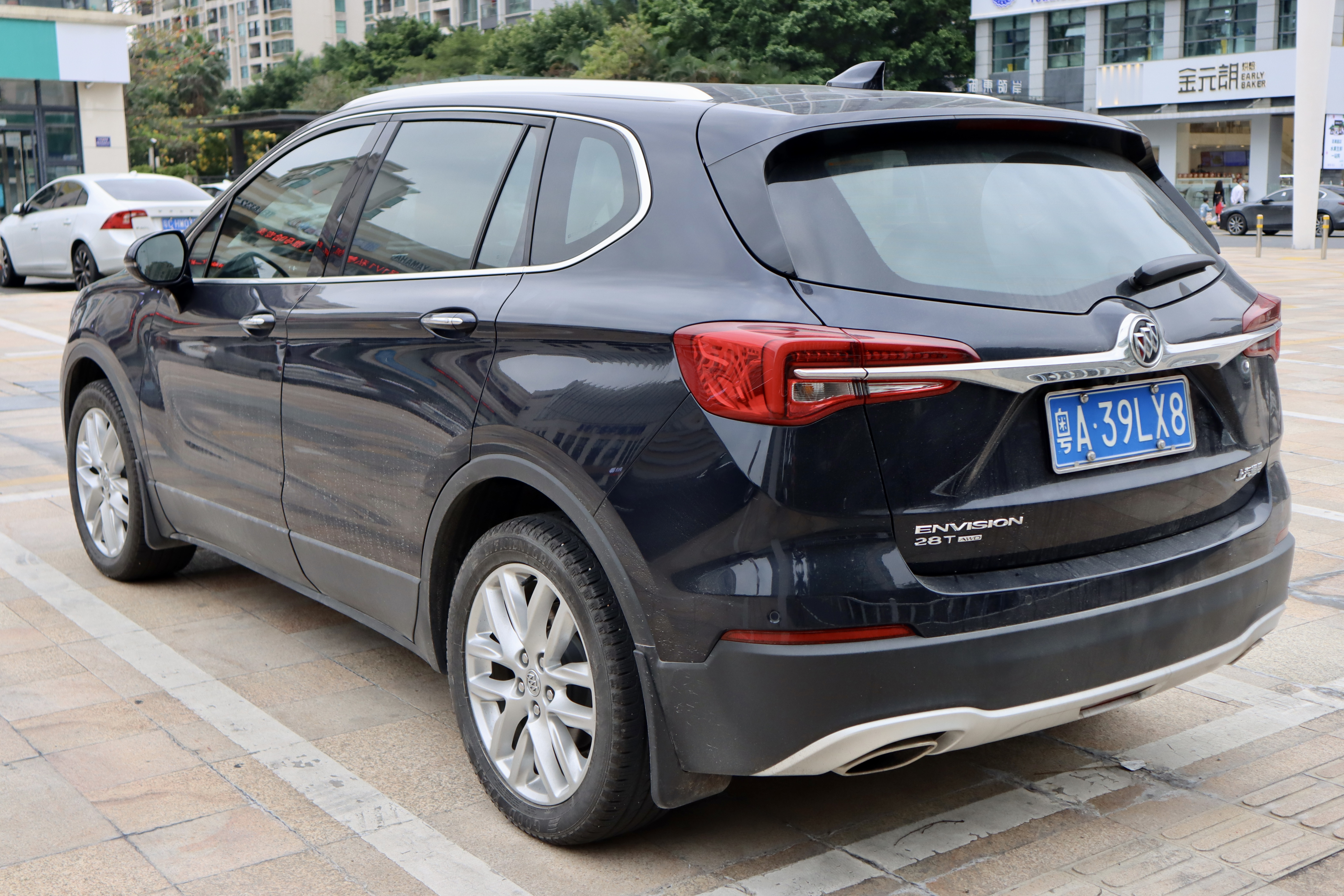
2020 Buick Envision (China, facelift)

== Second generation (2021) ==
Second generation
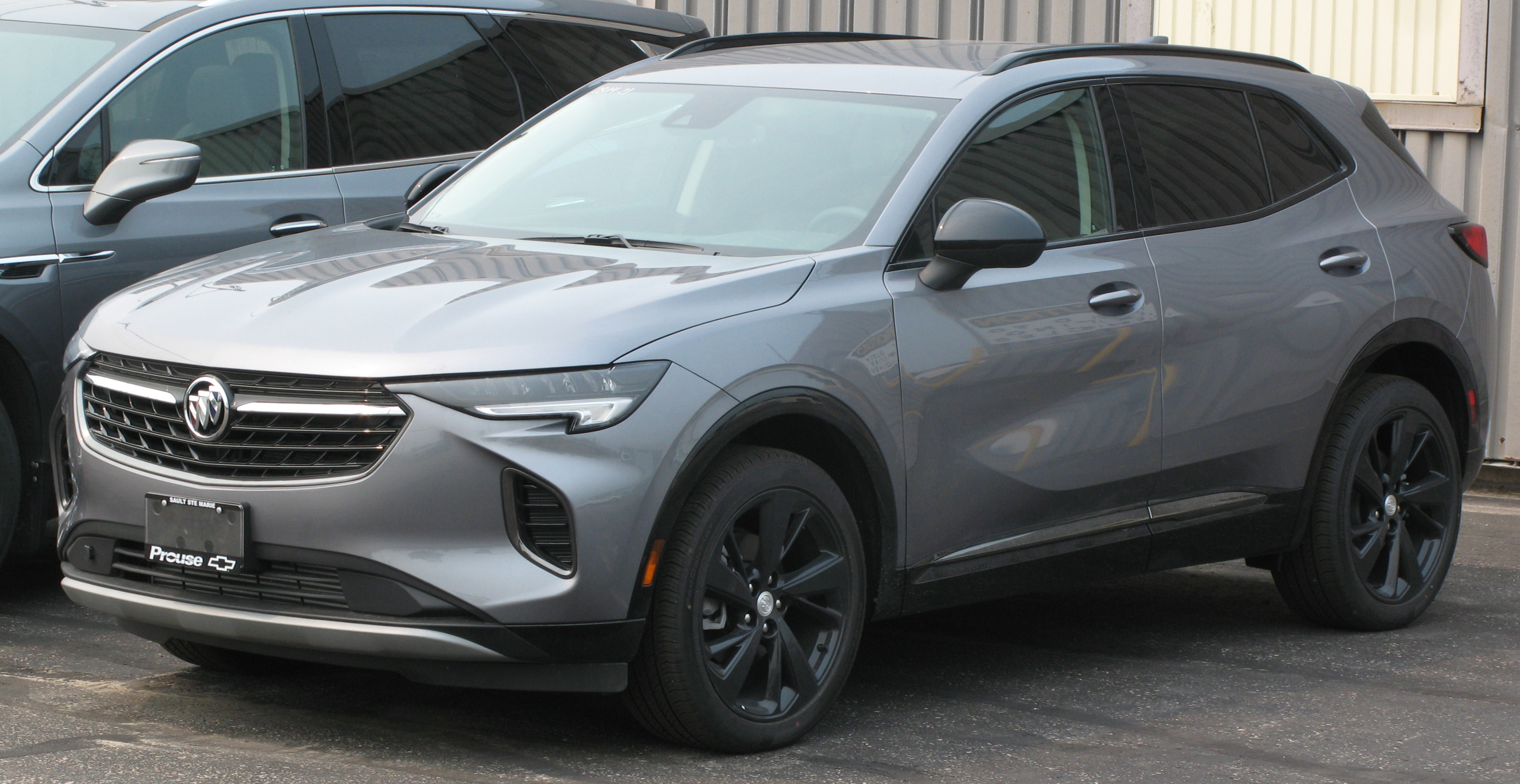

Overview
- Also called: Buick Envision S (China)
- Production: 2020–present
- Model years: 2021–present

Body and chassis
- Platform: E2XX
- Related: Cadillac XT4

Powertrain
- Engine: 2.0 L LSY turbo gasoline I4
- Transmission: 9-speed automatic

Dimensions
- Wheelbase: 2,779 mm (109.4 in); 2,833 mm (111.5 in) (Plus)
- Length: 4,636 mm (182.5 in); 4,845 mm (190.7 in) (Plus)
- Width: 1,882 mm (74.1 in)
- Height: 1,641 mm (64.6 in)
- Curb weight: 1,672–1,784 kg (3,686–3,933 lb)

In May 2020, GM introduced the second generation of the Envision in the United States. It is powered by a 2.0L turbocharged four-cylinder engine producing 228 hp (170 kW) and 258 lb⋅ft (350 N⋅m) torque, paired with a 9-speed automatic transmission. The 2021 Envision includes a suite of standard safety features, including blind spot monitor, lane departure warning, and forward collision alert. Four trim levels are offered: base, Preferred, Essence, and for the first time, Buick's premium Avenir trim.

In China, the new Envision is sold alongside the first-generation Envision as the Envision S. The new Envision continues to be assembled in China at the SAIC-GM Dongyue Motors plant in Yantai alongside the previous generation model. The second generation Envision now shares the E2XX platform with the Cadillac XT4.

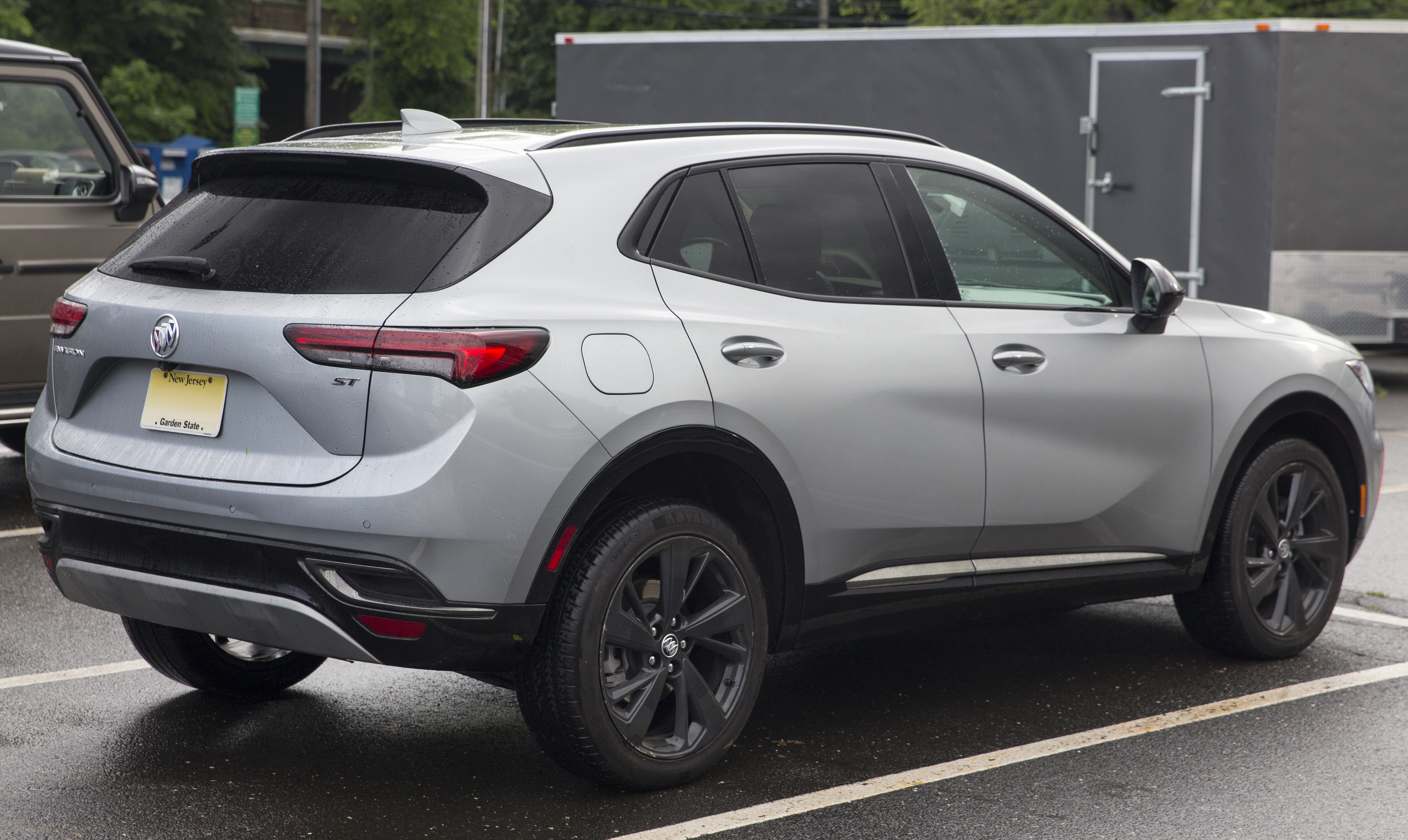
Envision ST Essence (rear)

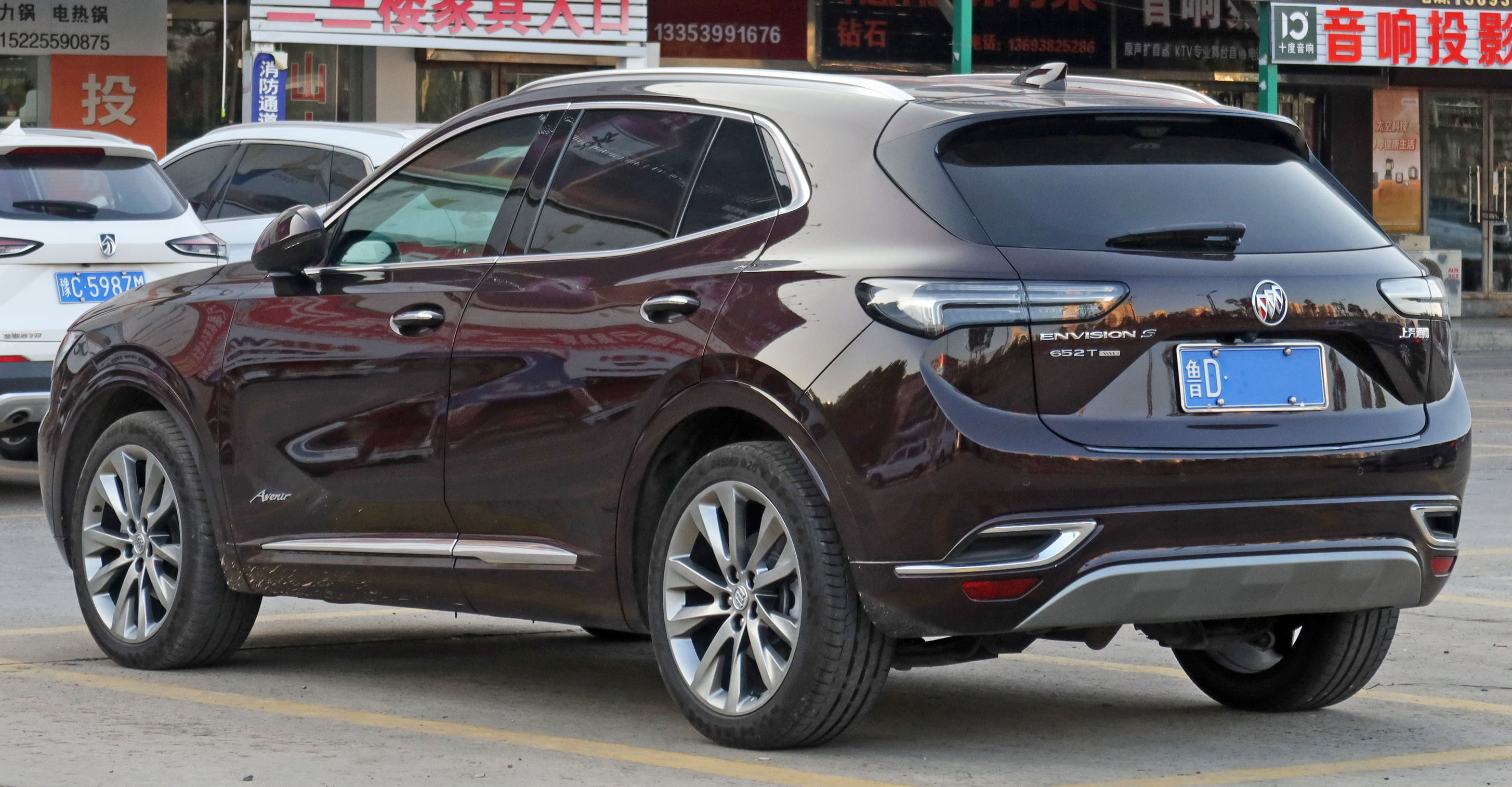
Buick Envision S Avenir (Rear view)

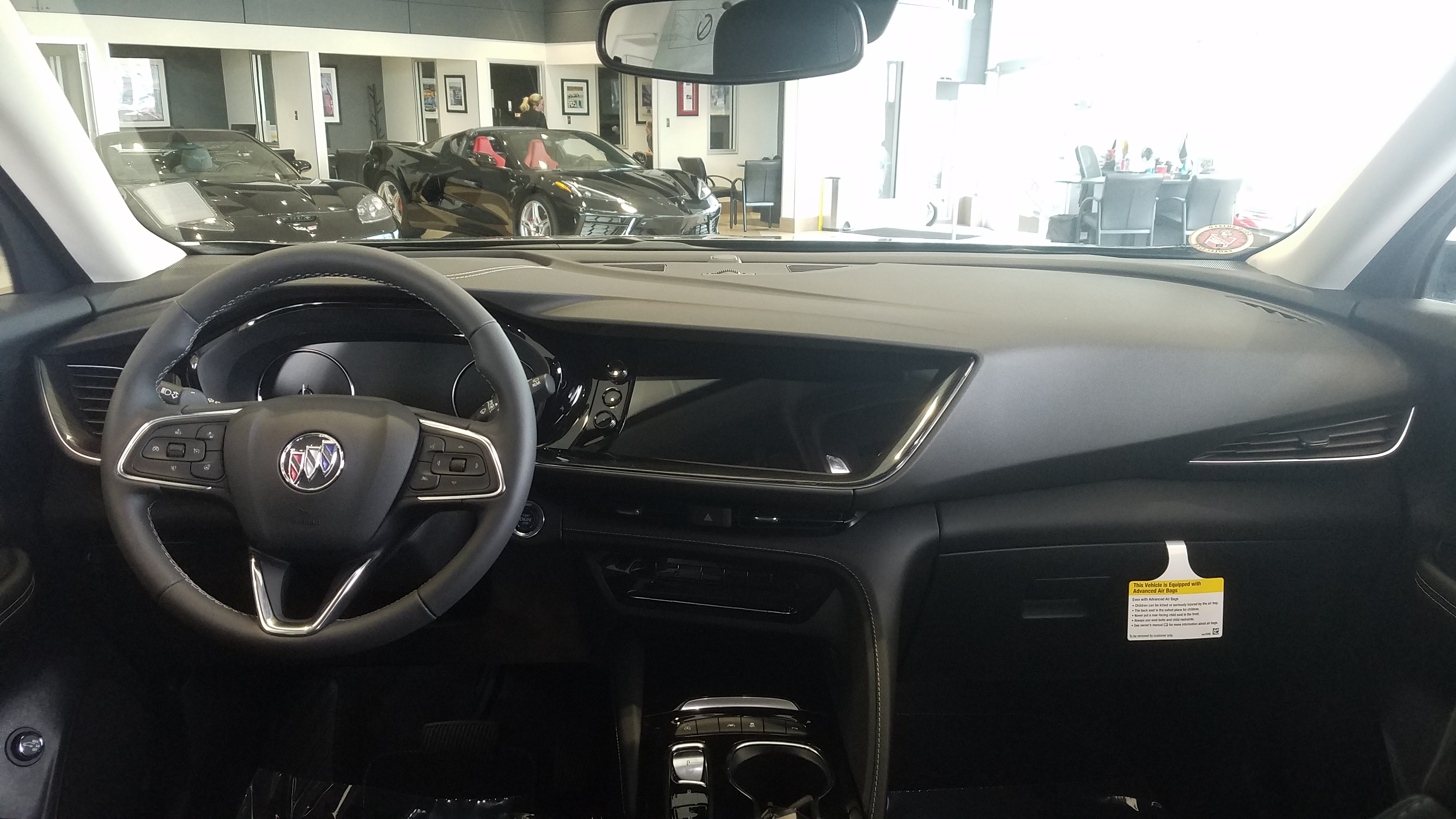
Interior

=== Envision Plus ===
Launched during the 2021 Shanghai Auto Show, the Buick Envision Plus is a stretched version of the Envision that serves as a three-row crossover SUV variant of the regular Buick Envision S in China. The wheelbase has been extended to 2,833 mm (111.5 in), resulting in a length of 4,845 mm (190.7 in).

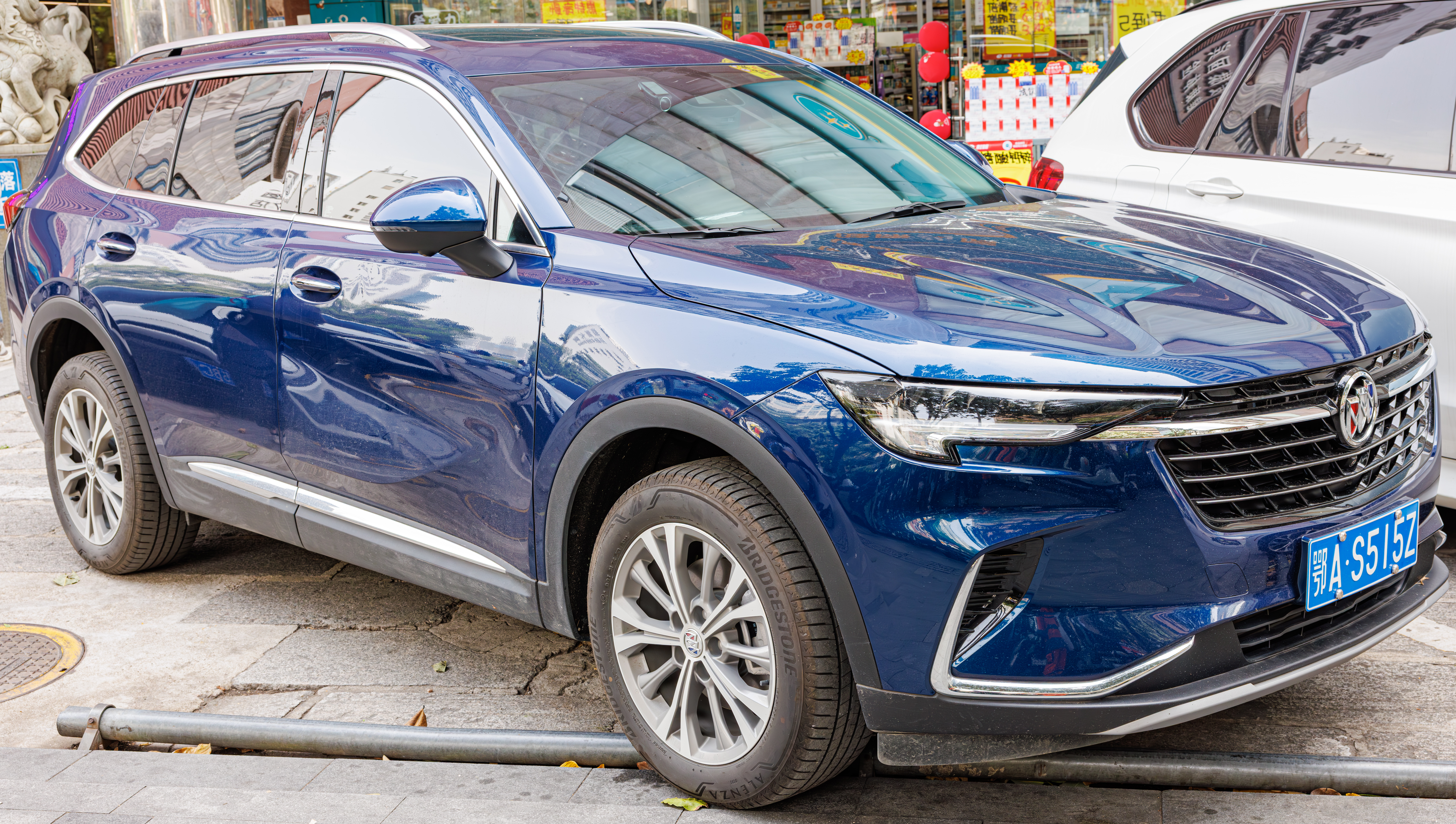
2021 Buick Envision Plus

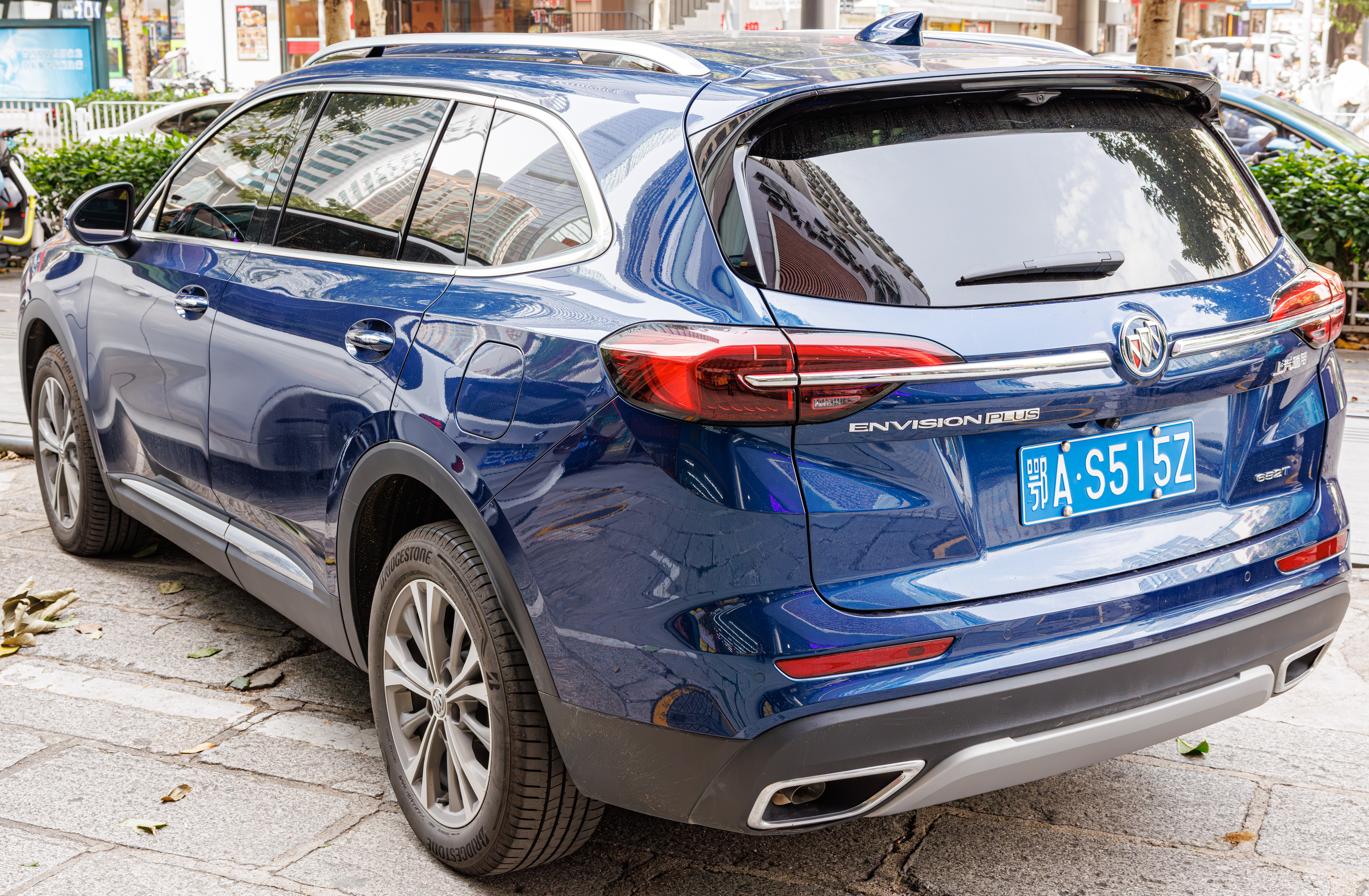
2021 Buick Envision Plus (rear)

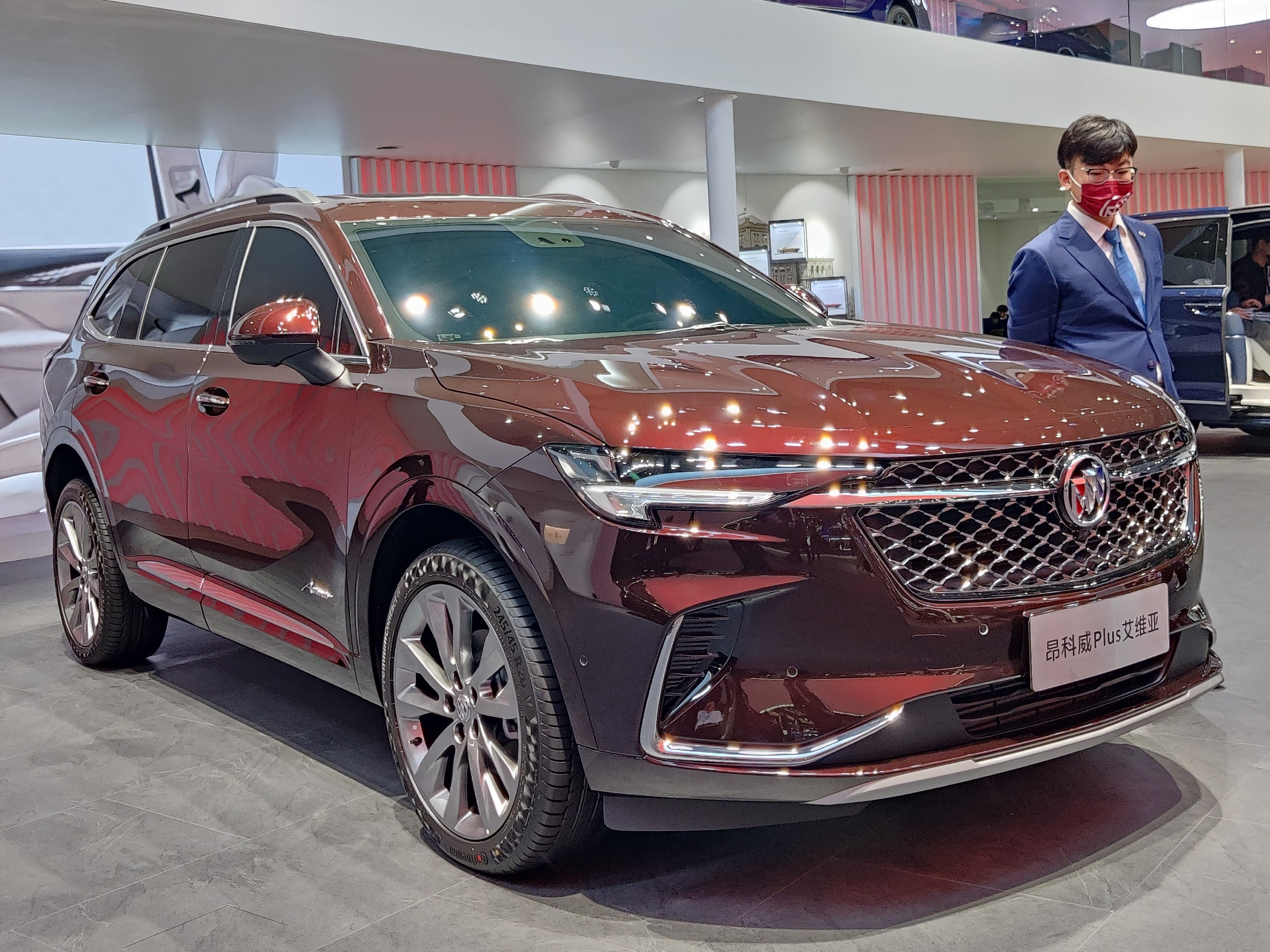
2021 Buick Envision Plus Avenir

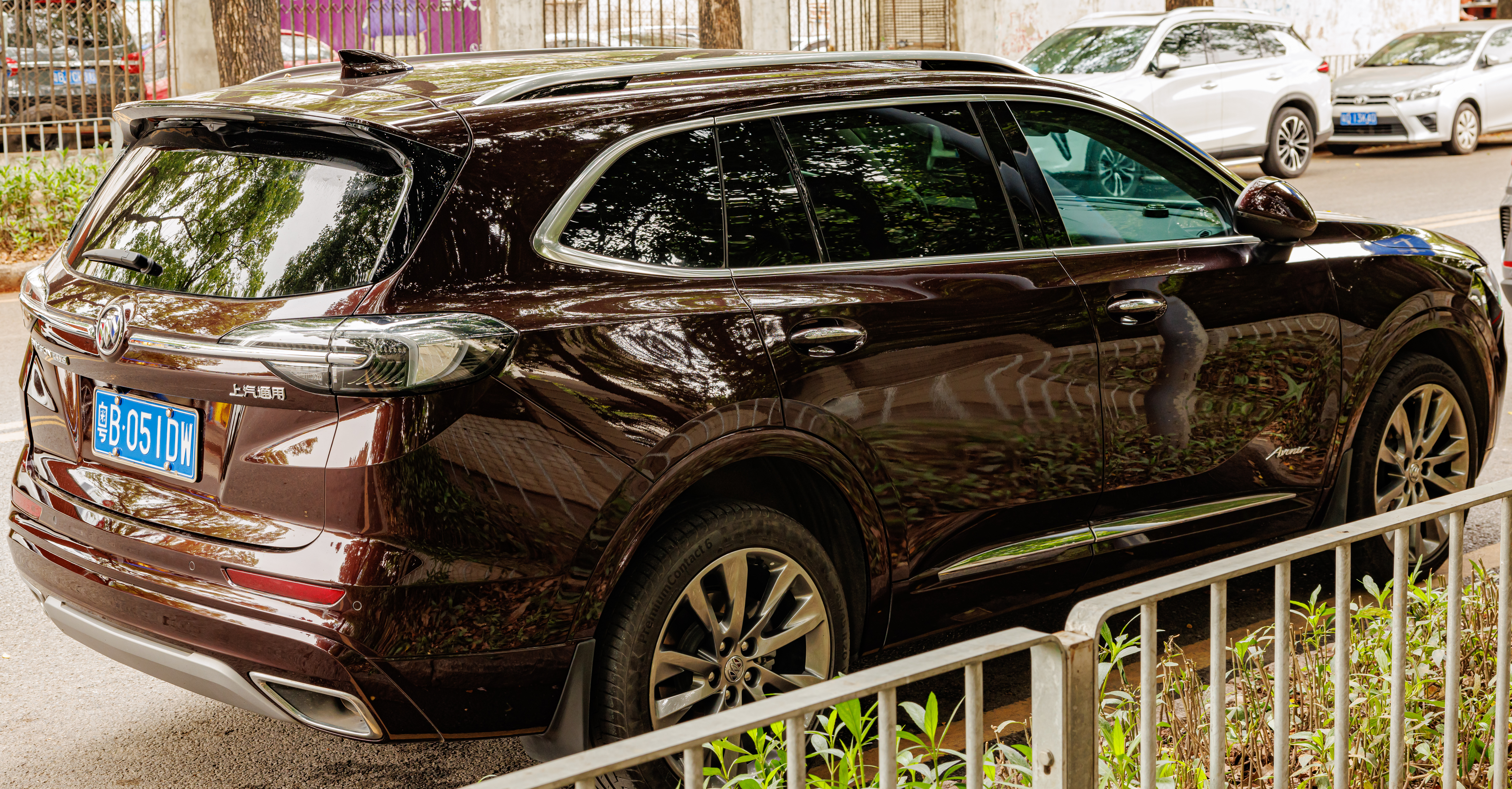
2021 Buick Envision Plus Avenir (rear)

=== 2024 refresh ===
The Envision received a facelift for the 2024 model year. This includes front design changes and new dashboard-mounted digital displays.

GM also planned the introduction of Super Cruise, but it was not realized due to the delay in its launch.

In January 2026, GM announced plans to move production of models sold in the U.S. to its Fairfax Assembly site in Kansas City, Kansas, in 2028.

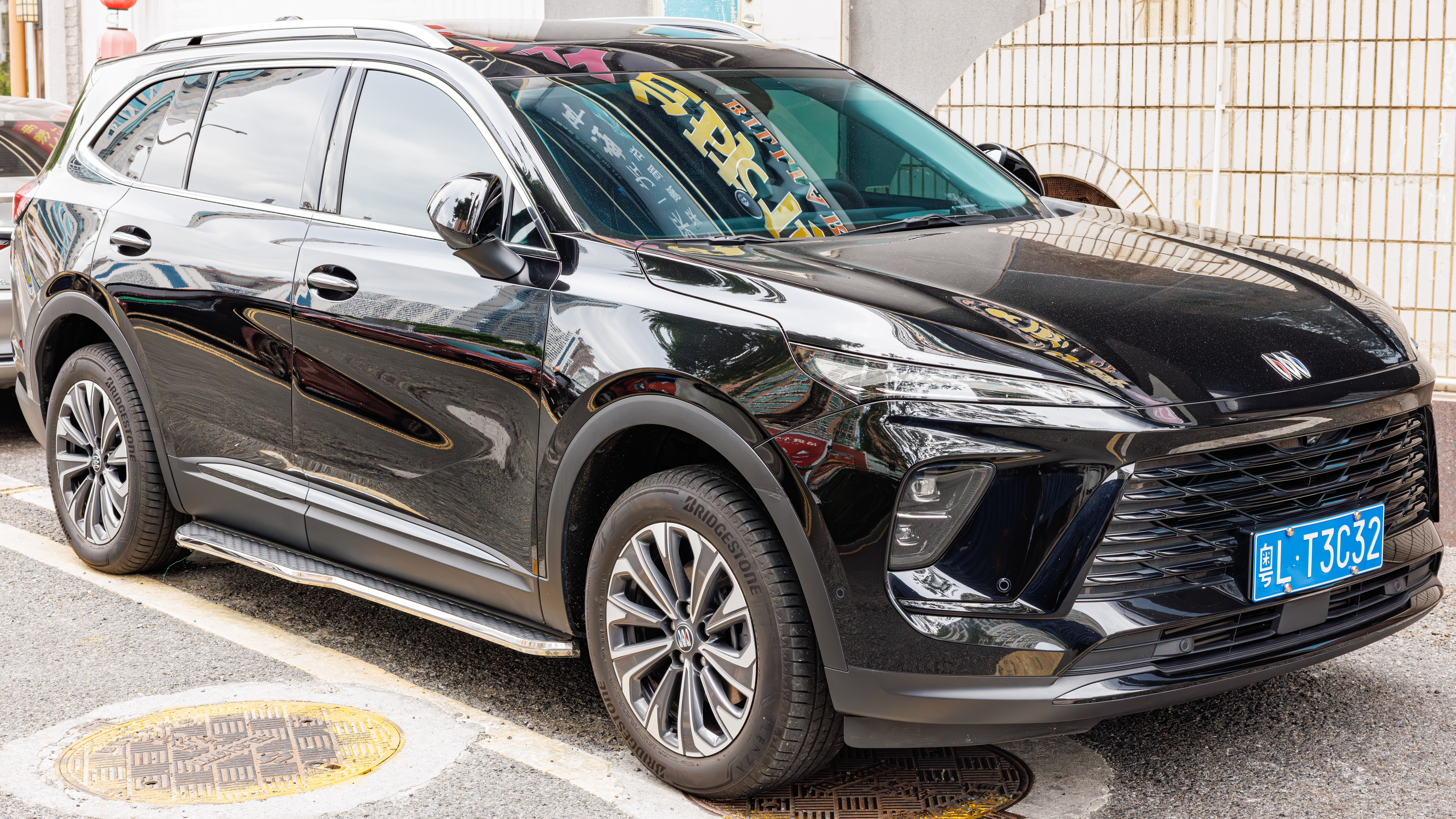
2024 Buick Envision Plus

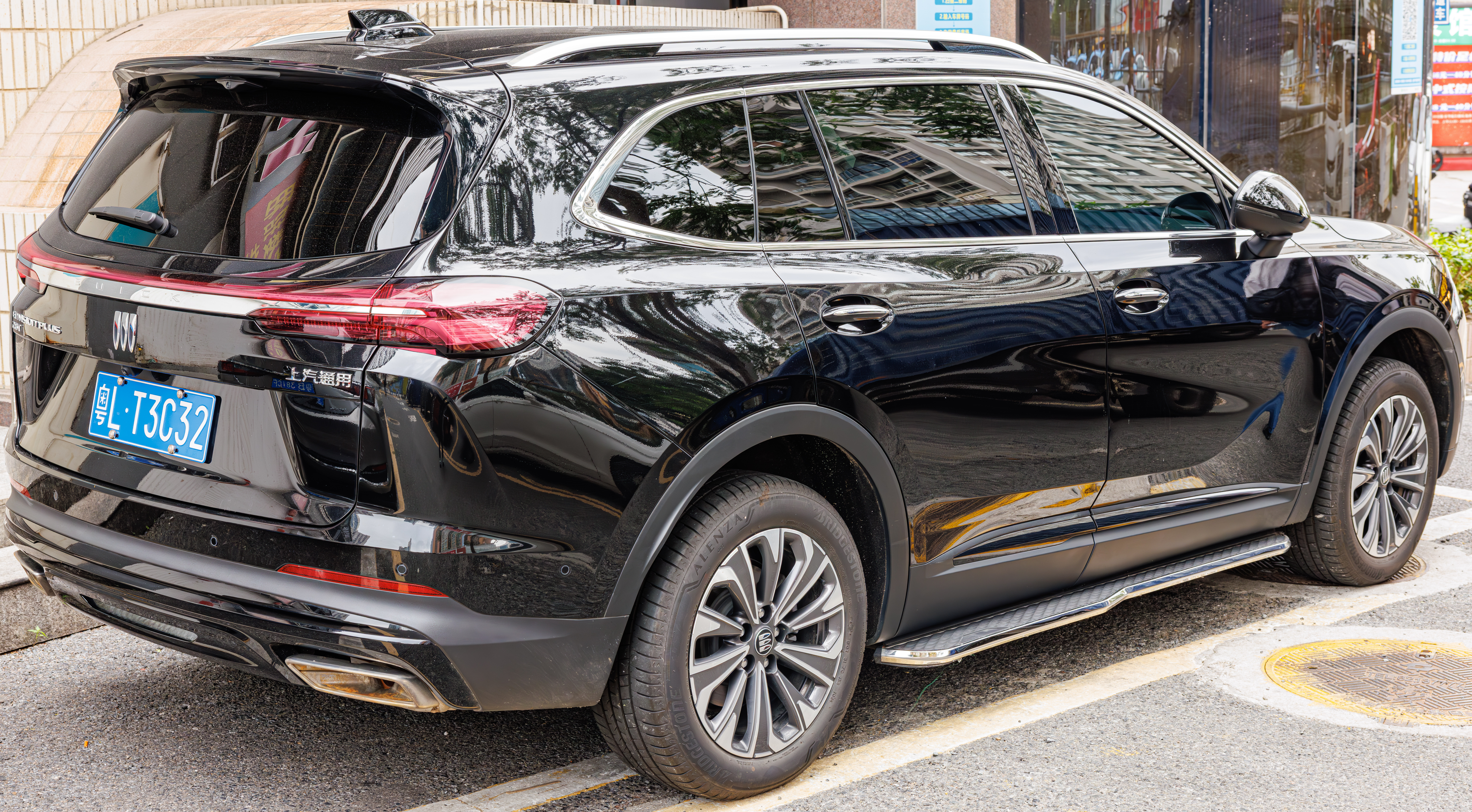
2024 Buick Envision Plus (rear)

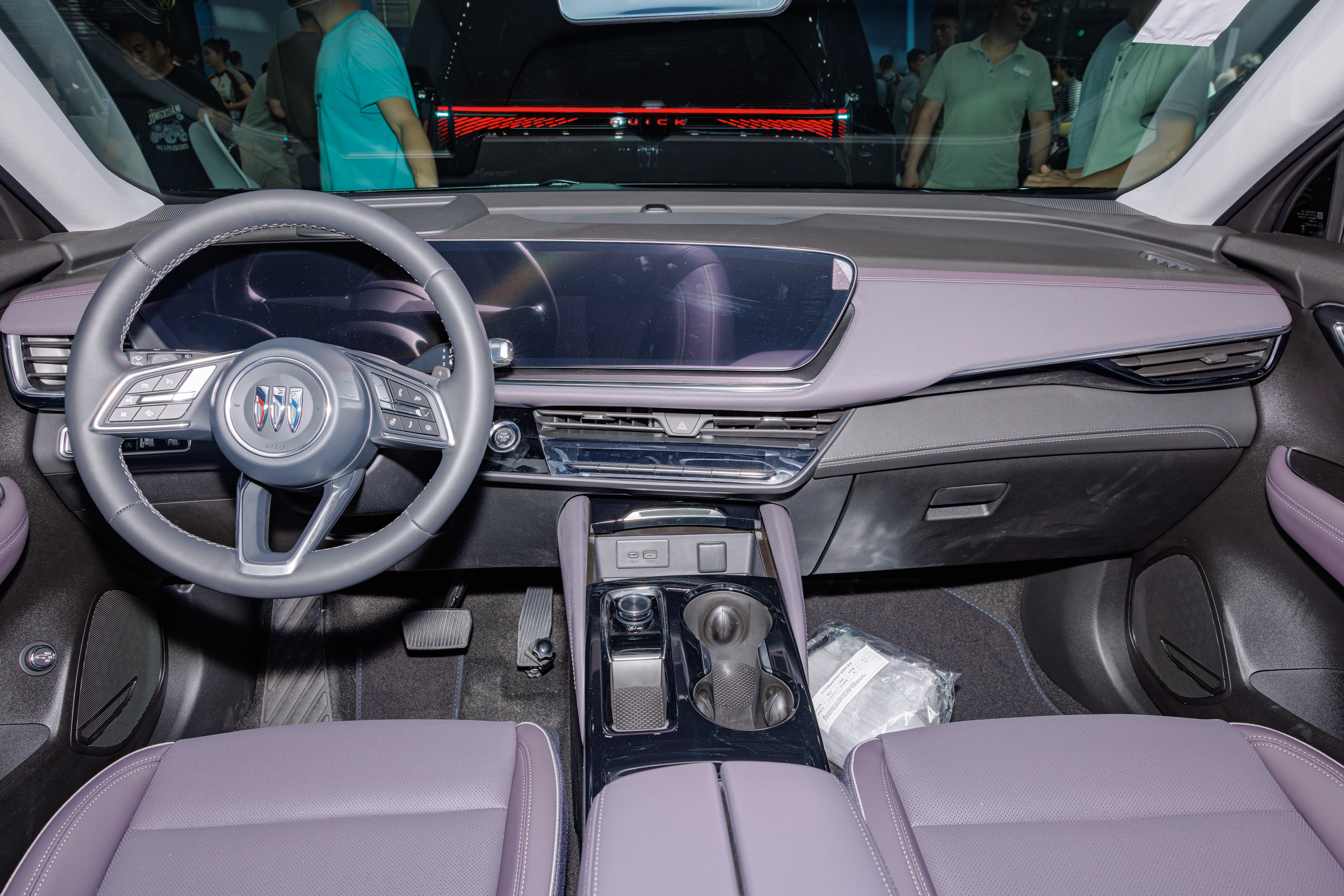
2024 Buick Envision Plus Interior

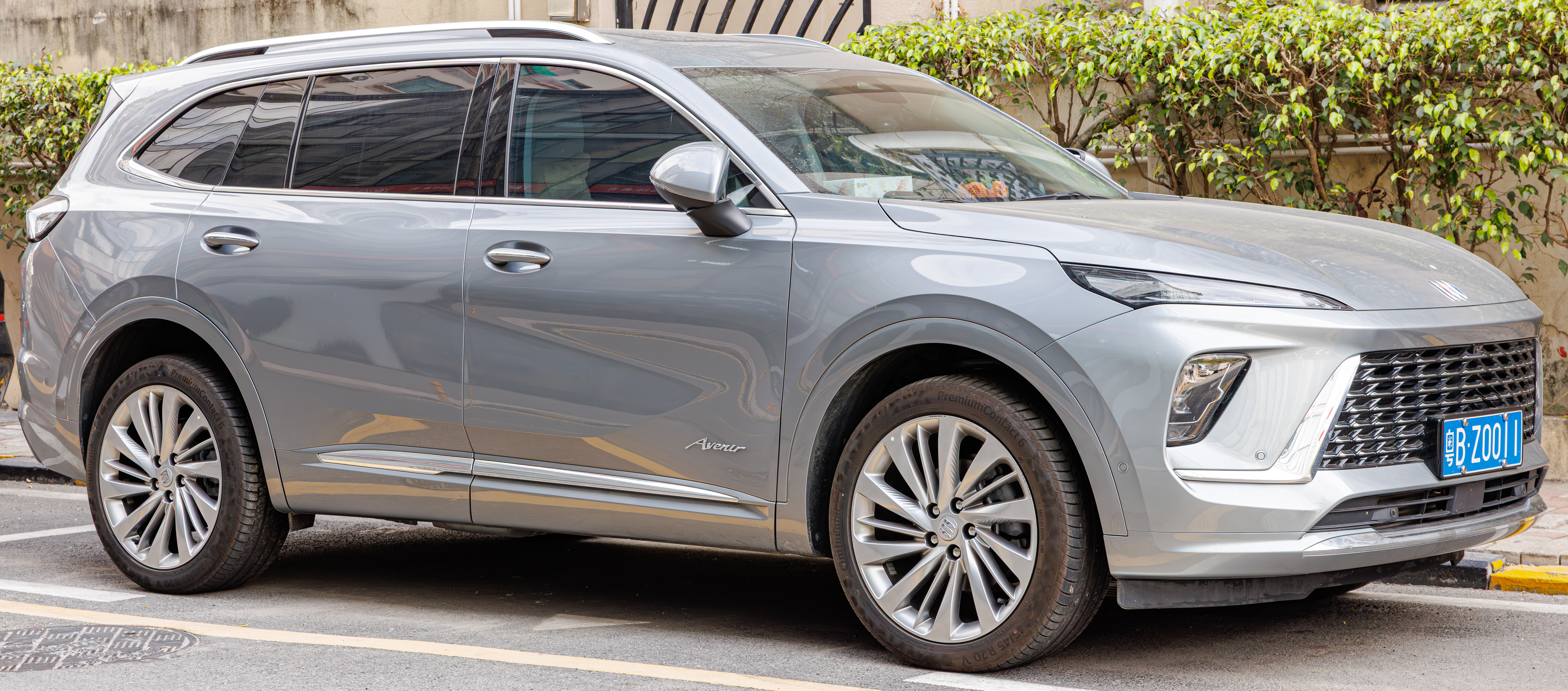
2024 Buick Envision Plus Avenir

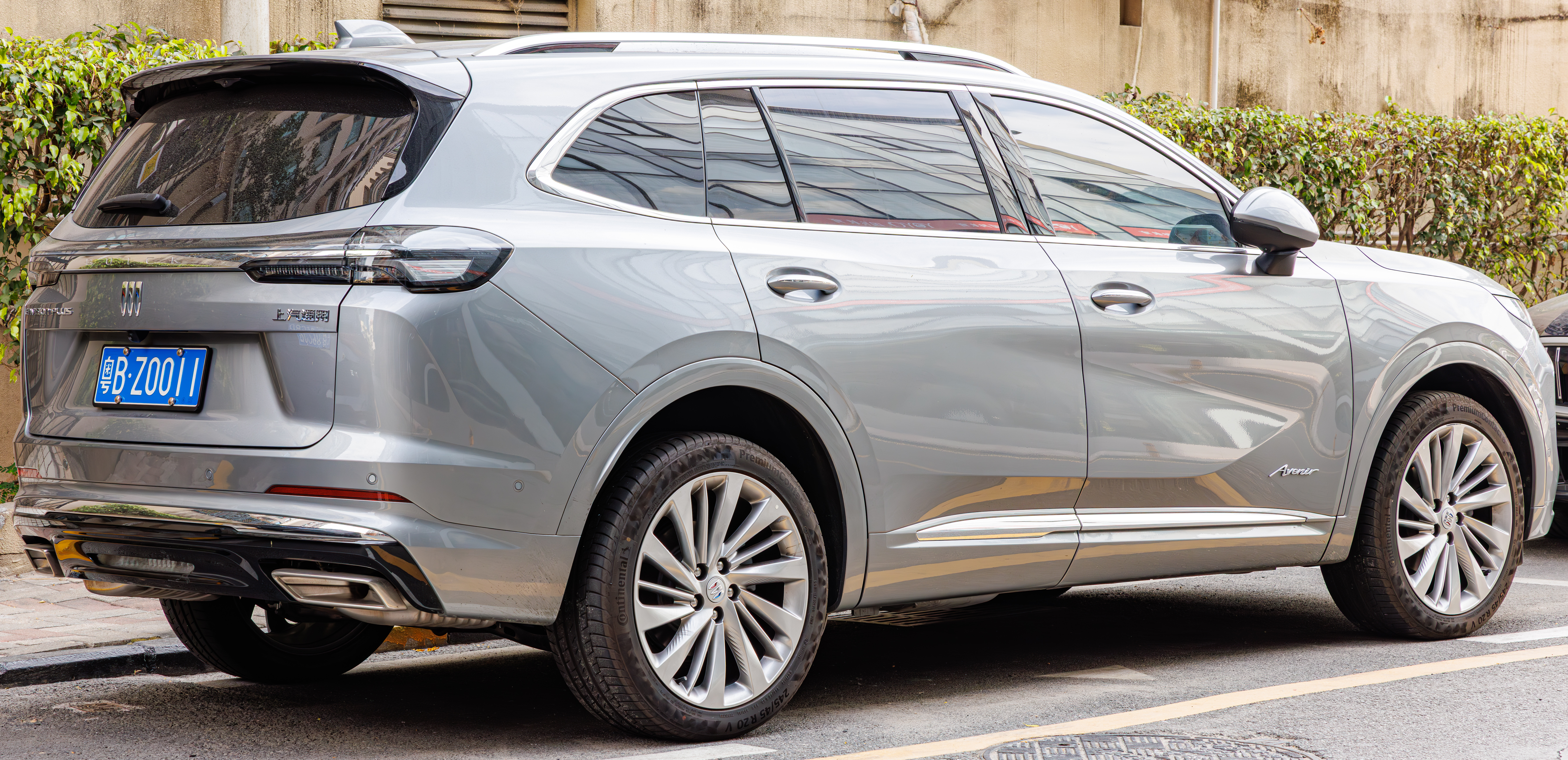
2024 Buick Envision Plus Avenir (rear)

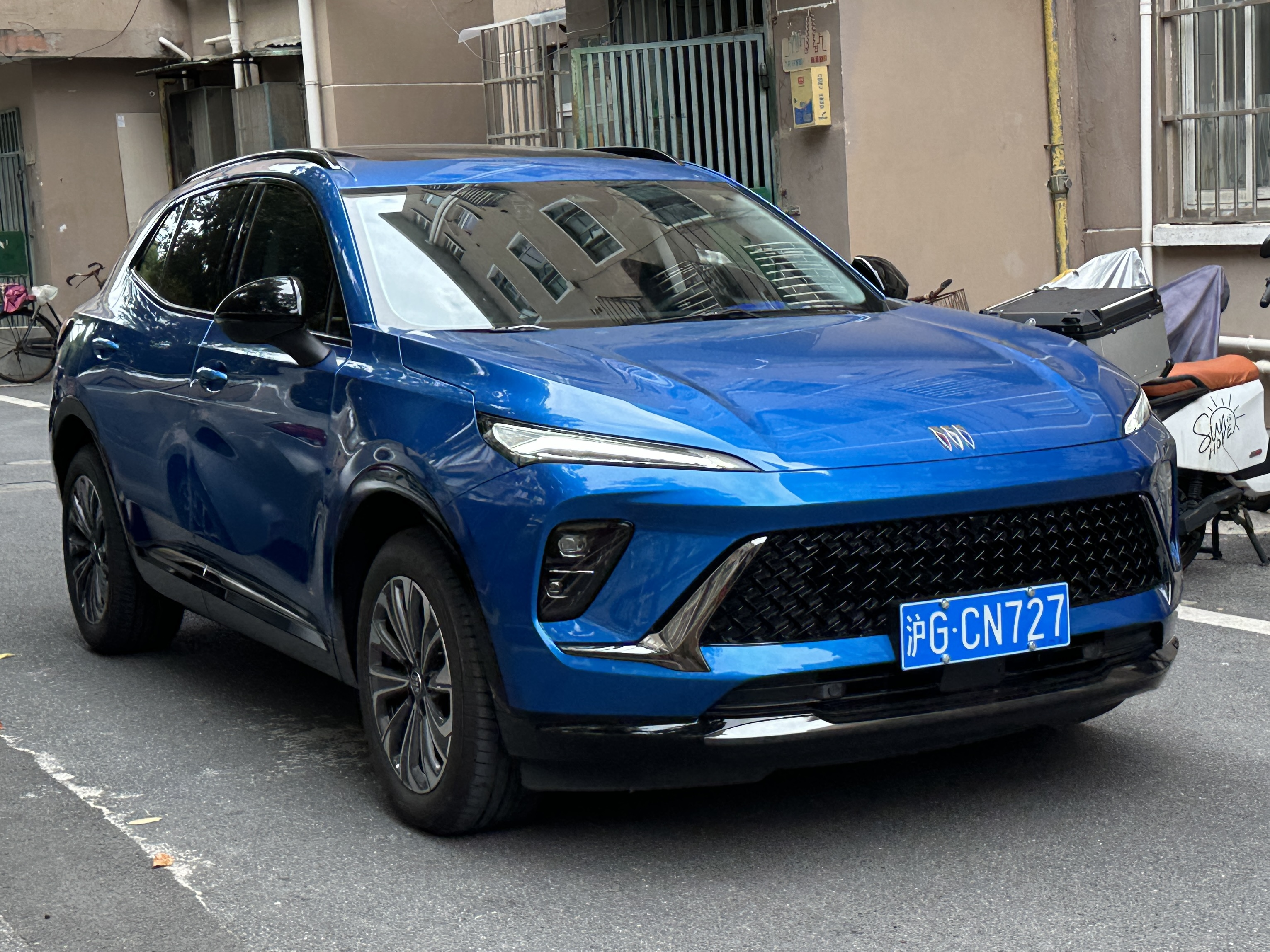
2024 Buick Envision S

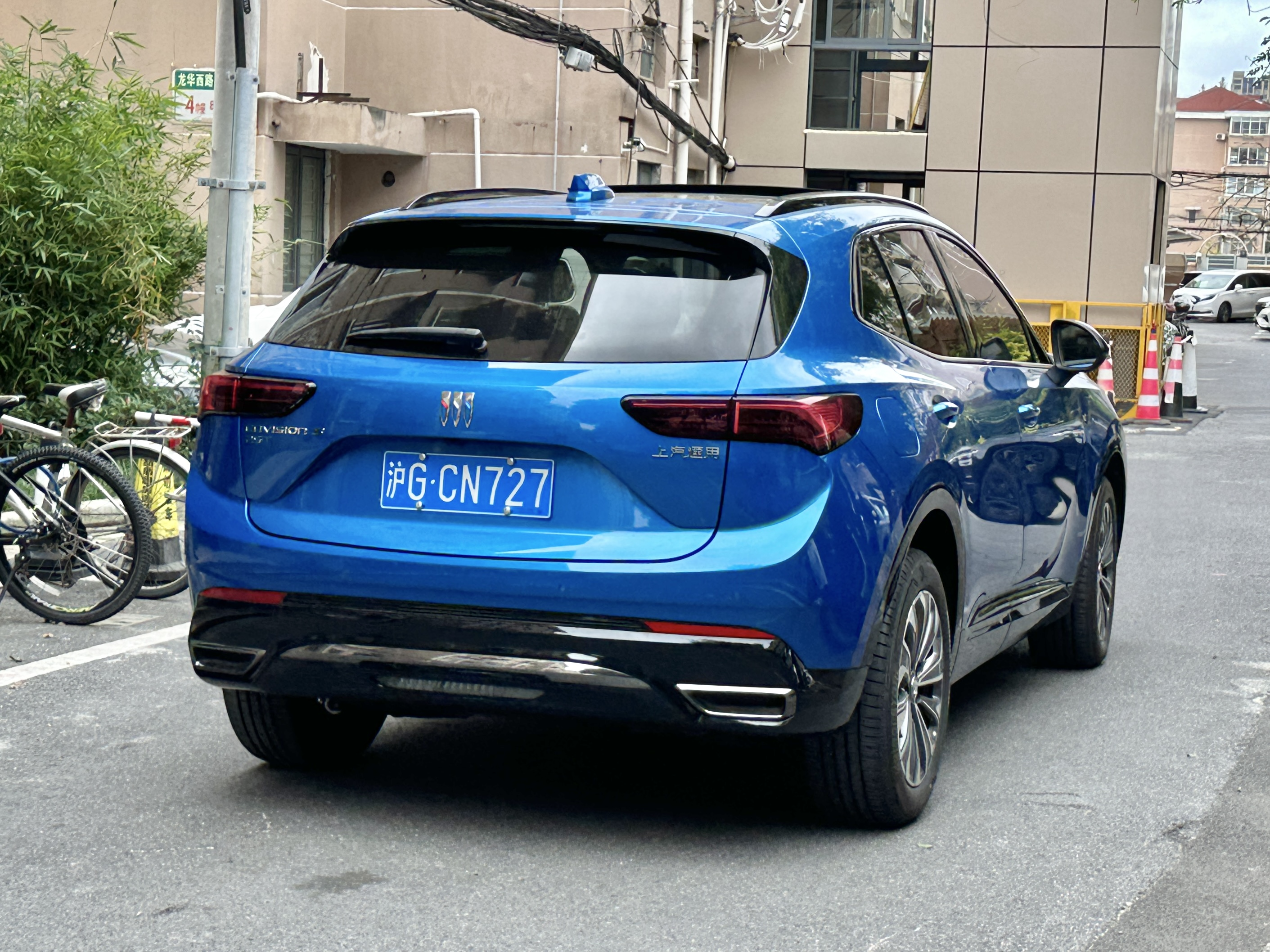
2024 Buick Envision S (rear)

== Sales ==
In 2017, the Envision was Buick's third bestselling model in the U.S. with sales of just over 41,000 units. Sales in the U.S. dropped 27% in 2018 but rebounded slightly in 2019. In 2020, Envision was the only Buick model in the U.S. to see a sales increase over 2019. Envision sales peaked in the U.S. in 2024 with over 47,000 units sold.

Calendar year	United States	China		
Calendar year	United States	Envision S	Envision Plus	Total
2014	—	—	—	19,683
2015	—	—	—	162,941
2016	14,193	—	—	275,383
2017	41,040	—	—	236,229
2018	30,152	—	—	191,029
2019	33,229	—	—	132,568
2020	34,942		—	167,880
2021	46,450			146,476
2022	25,871			130,181
2023	44,281	—	98,862	143,054
2024	47,340	14,623	60,206	118,471
2025	41,924	13,557	101,086	166,894

=== Tariff impact ===
On August 6, 2018, General Motors announced that it might withdraw the Envision from the United States and Canada markets due to President Donald Trump's tariffs on Chinese goods should its request to seek a tariff waiver for the vehicles be denied. The automaker saw the exemption as "the only way" to continue offering the vehicle to U.S. consumers, according to GM President Dan Ammann. The exemption was denied on May 29, 2019, but GM opted to pay the tariffs without raising the price on the vehicle. In January 2026, GM announced they would mitigate the impact of tariffs by shifting production and final assembly of the Envision from China to their production plant in Kansas City by 2028.
