= Kyle Vogt =

American engineer

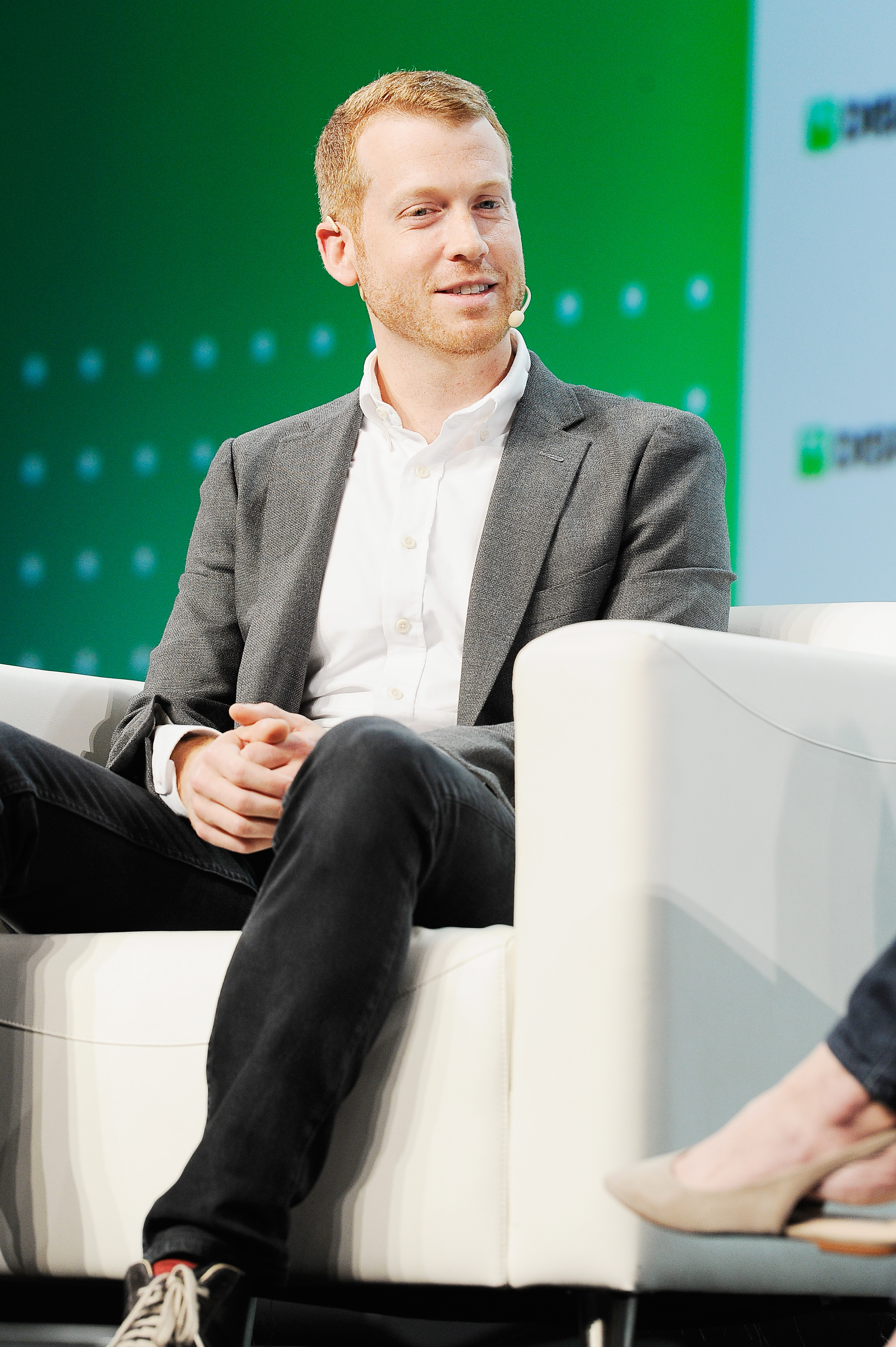
- Vogt in 2018
- Born: 1984 or 1985 (age c. 40); Kansas City, Kansas, U.S.
- Education: Massachusetts Institute of Technology
- Occupations: Businessman, tech entrepreneur
- Known for: Founder and former Chief Executive Officer, Cruise; Co-founder, Twitch; Co-founder, The Bot Company
- Board member of: Upside

Kyle Vogt (born 1984 or 1985) is an American technology entrepreneur known for his contributions to autonomous vehicle technology and live-streaming platform technologies.

Vogt is a co-founder of Cruise Automation, a developer of self-driving car technology, which was acquired by General Motors in 2016. Prior to that, he was instrumental in the creation of Justin.tv, which evolved into the popular streaming platform Twitch.

In 2024, Vogt established The Bot Company, a startup focused on developing consumer-oriented robots for household tasks.

== Early life and education ==
Vogt was born and raised in Kansas City, Kansas. From a young age, he demonstrated an interest in autonomous driving technology. Vogt attended public schools in the Olathe and Shawnee Mission school districts, graduating from Shawnee Mission Northwest High School in 2004.

Vogt pursued undergraduate studies in computer science and electrical engineering at the Massachusetts Institute of Technology. While there, he participated in the 2004 DARPA Grand Challenge, a pivotal event in the development of autonomous vehicle technology. Vogt also interned at iRobot, the company known for creating the Roomba and competed in two seasons of BattleBots.

== Career ==
=== Justin.tv ===
In his junior year, Vogt left MIT to join the team that would create Justin.tv and later Twitch. As a co-founder of Justin.tv, Vogt was noted for his technical proficiency, often solving complex coding challenges and designing camera systems crucial for live streaming.

In June 2011, Vogt co-founded two spin-off companies: Socialcam (later acquired by Autodesk in 2012 for $60 million) and Twitch (subsequently acquired by Amazon for $970 million in 2014).

=== Cruise Automation ===
In October 2013, Vogt founded Cruise Automation, serving as President, Chief Executive Officer, and Chief Technology Officer. The company, which develops self-driving car technology, participated in Y Combinator, a startup accelerator. In March 2016, General Motors acquired Cruise Automation for over $1 billion, with Cruise continuing to operate as an independent subsidiary. Following the acquisition, Vogt and Cruise Co-Founder Dan Kan became the youngest senior directors at GM. Vogt and Kan were listed as number 7 on Fortune's 2016 40 Under 40 List.

In December 2021, after Cruise CEO Dan Ammann left the company, Vogt became interim CEO until February 2022 when he became CEO, maintaining his CTO and President titles.

In November 2023, Vogt resigned as CEO following the California DMV's suspension of Cruise's autonomous operations in the state. A subsequent internal investigation by Quinn Emanuel Urquhart & Sullivan law firm identified poor leadership at Cruise and instances where Vogt withheld information from media. While the firm concluded that "no Cruise executives or employees intentionally deceived regulators," Cruise's failure to correct the public narrative "caused both regulators and the media to accuse Cruise of misleading them,” according to the Wall Street Journal.

=== The Bot Company ===
In 2024, Vogt launched The Bot Company, a robotics startup aimed at developing household task-oriented robots. The company launched with $150 million in seed funding from investors such as Spark Capital and Nat Friedman among others. The Bot Company was valued at $550 million as of May 2024.

== Animal advocacy and philanthropy ==
Vogt co-founded Charlie's Acres, a farm animal sanctuary in Sonoma, California, in 2016. This inspired Vogt to pursue a vegan lifestyle and related advocacy ventures. Through his charitable organization, the Vogt Foundation, Vogt helps fund academic research related to nutrition and veganism, such as the Stanford study, Cardiometabolic Effects of Omnivorous vs Vegan Diets in Identical Twins: A Randomized Clinical Trial. This study was the subject of the Netflix documentary You Are What You Eat, where Vogt was a co-producer. He was also an executive producer for The Game Changers, a 2018 documentary about vegan athletes.

Vogt launched Baia, a plant-based Italian restaurant in San Francisco, with chef Matthew Kenney in 2020. He also serves on the board of Upside Foods, a sustainable cultured meat production company.

In 2020, while adhering to a vegan diet, Vogt completed the World Marathon Challenge. According to several sources, he set a world record in the Men's category for Shortest Duration, completing the challenge in 3 days, 9 hours, and 38 minutes.
