= Cruise (autonomous vehicle) =

American self-driving car company

Coordinates: 37.7699°N 122.4098°W

Cruise LLC
- Type: Subsidiary
- Industry: Self-driving car / fully autonomous vehicles
- Founded: October 2013; 13 years ago
- Founders: Kyle Vogt; Dan Kan
- Headquarters: San Francisco, California, U.S.
- Key people: Marc Whitten (CEO); Mo Elshenawy (president & CTO)
- Products: Cruise AV, Cruise Origin
- Number of employees: 3,800 (2023)
- Parent: General Motors
- Website: getcruise.com

Cruise LLC was an American self-driving car company that became a subsidiary of General Motors, headquartered in San Francisco, California. Founded in 2013 by Kyle Vogt and Dan Kan, Cruise tested and developed autonomous car technology. The company was acquired by General Motors in 2016, and operated as a largely autonomous subsidiary, focusing on producing a fleet of driverless taxis. Following a series of incidents, it suspended operations in October 2023, and Kyle Vogt resigned as CEO in November 2023. The company began returning its vehicles to public roads in May 2024.

In December 2024, GM stopped funding Cruise. Work on autonomous vehicles was to be incorporated into development of advanced driver assistance systems for personal vehicles, no longer funding autonomous taxis.

== History ==
Cruise initially focused on developing direct-to-consumer kits to retrofit vehicles with limited self-driving capabilities. The earlier generation of Cruise technology, RP-1, offered an autonomous on-demand feature available for the Audi A4 or S4 (2012 or later). The $10,000 kit will eventually retrofit all vehicles into a highway autopilot system. Ultimately, Cruise determined that the greater challenge lay in conquering city driving. In January 2014, the company decided to abandon the RP-1 and produce a fully autonomous vehicle using the Nissan Leaf. In 2015, Cruise changed its strategy and began writing software for fully self-driving vehicles. The brand philosophy urges car owners to engage in shared ownership instead of individual ownership to reduce environmental damage, the number of accidents, and congestion in big cities.

Cruise received a permit to test self-driving vehicle technology from the California Department of Motor Vehicles in June 2015. After it successfully graduated from Y Combinator, a startup accelerator that mentors up-and-coming entrepreneurs, Cruise was acquired by General Motors in March 2016. The amount was undisclosed, and reports have estimated the number from "north of $500 million", to $580 million to over $1 billion. Cruise forms the core of GM's self-driving efforts.

Upon acquisition, Cruise had around 40 employees. In a September 2016 interview with Darrell Etherington at the San Francisco TechCrunch Disrupt conference, Vogt confirmed that the company had over 100 employees. The number of people employed by Cruise has not generally been known, but multiple outlets reported that Cruise continued to grow rapidly. In June 2017, GM CEO Mary Barra said that Cruise had close to 200 employees.

=== Acquisition by GM and investments ===
Industry observers have noted, and GM CEO Mary Barra has stated, that GM allowed Cruise to remain responsible for both technology and commercialization, giving Cruise independence to avoid the pitfalls common when a large company acquires a technology startup.

Since becoming part of General Motors in March 2016, Cruise has been working on developing software and hardware to make fully autonomous vehicles using modified Chevrolet Bolts.

In April 2017, GM announced plans to invest $14 million to expand Cruise operations in California, adding an estimated 1,163 full-time employees by 2021.

In May 2018, Cruise announced that SoftBank Vision Fund would invest $2.25 billion into the company, along with another $1.1 billion from GM itself. In October 2018, Cruise announced that Honda would be investing $750 million into the company, followed by another $2 billion over the next 12 years.

In November 2018, the company got a new CEO, Dan Ammann, who had been a president of GM before accepting this position. Cruise raised an additional $1.15 billion in new equity in May 2019, bringing its total valuation to $19 billion.

In January 2021 Microsoft, Honda and institutional investors invested a further $2 billion in combined new equity bringing the valuation to $30 billion. In March 2021, Cruise acquired Voyage, a self-driving startup that had been spun off from Udacity.

In March 2022, GM acquired Softbank Vision Fund 1's equity ownership in Cruise for $2.1 billion, and made an additional $1.35 billion investment in Cruise.

=== Robotaxi testing and permits ===
In September 2021, Cruise received a permit from the California Department of Motor Vehicles to provide driverless taxi rides in the state. The permit allows the company to provide the service without the inclusion of safety drivers - staff that would accompany the vehicle and take control of it if necessary. In November 2021, Cruise co-founder Kyle Vogt took the first driverless taxi drive in the company's history.

In February 2022, Cruise announced that it is now open to the public. Also in February 2022, Cruise petitioned U.S. regulators (NHTSA) for permission to build and deploy a self-driving vehicle without human controls. At the end of the month, Kyle Vogt was officially named CEO.

In June 2022, Cruise received California's first Driverless Deployment Permit, allowing it to charge fees for its service. This was the first company to offer rides without a driver in a major public city. The company recalled and updated software in 80 self-driving vehicles in August, following a crash in June. As of September 2022, the company operated 100 robotaxis in San Francisco, and announced their intentions to increase the size of their fleet to 5,000. However, this drew some criticism due to the potential for this to increase traffic within the city.

In September 2022, the company announced it would expand its service to Phoenix, Arizona, and Austin, Texas, within three months, with the goal of adding $1 billion in revenue by 2025. The Verge reported that the company lost $561 million in Q1 2023, with most of the $30 million in revenue coming from interest and other non-operating sources of income, but said it remains on the path to reach $1 billion in revenue by 2025 and $50 billion by 2030. The article noted Cruise CEO Kyle Vogt said a small portion of the company's fleet offered driverless rides 24 hours a day across the entire city of San Francisco.

=== Suspension of operations and eventual shut down ===
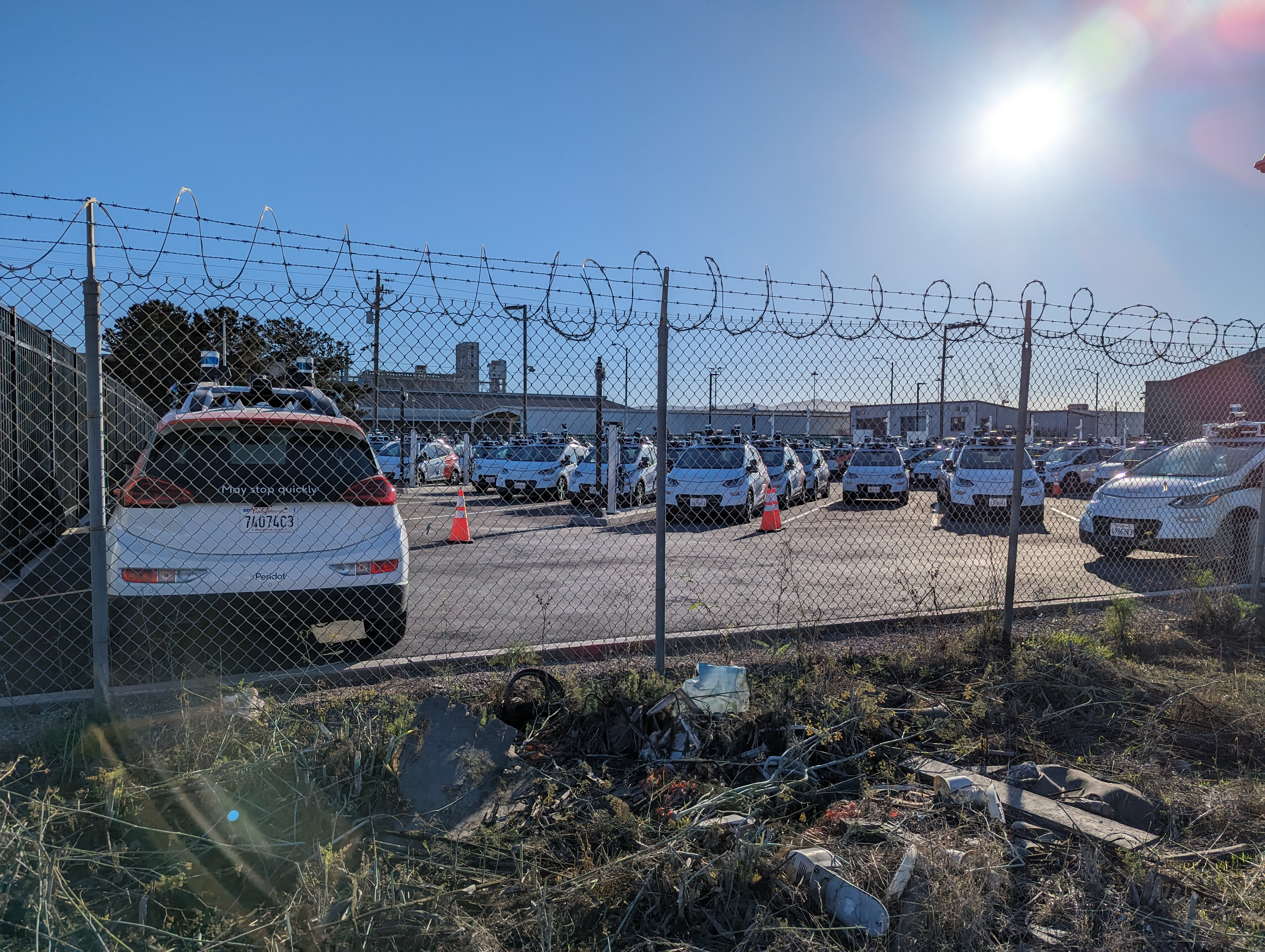
Cruise charging and storage facility in San Francisco (Nov 2023)

In October 2023, following a barrage of safety concerns and incidents since Cruise received approval in August 2023 for round-the-clock robotaxi service in San Francisco, the California DMV suspended Cruise's self-driving car permits following an investigation of a pedestrian collision, effective immediately. Three days later, Cruise announced it would temporarily halt robotaxi operations nationwide. Outside of California, the voluntary nationwide scope expansion suspended services in Arizona (Phoenix), Texas (Austin, Dallas, and Houston), and Florida (Miami).

On November 8, Cruise announced a recall of 950 autonomous vehicles, to be implemented by an over-the-air software update, as a result of the pedestrian collision. The next day, Cruise announced it had laid off an unspecified number of contingent workers who had supported autonomous vehicle operations; at the time, Cruise had an estimated 4,000 full-time employees.

On November 19, CEO Kyle Vogt announced his resignation from Cruise in the wake of the suspension. GM appointed Mo Elshenawy, Cruise's executive vice president of engineering, and Craig Glidden, GM's General Counsel, as co-presidents.

A subsequent internal investigation conducted by Quinn Emanuel Urquhart & Sullivan and released in January 2024 concluded that the DMV's suspension of Cruise's operations was largely the result of deficient leadership at Cruise. At that time, the company remained under investigation by the U.S. Department of Justice and the U.S. Securities and Exchange Commission.

On June 25, 2024, the company announced Marc Whitten, a former Amazon and Microsoft executive, as its new CEO.

In December 2024, GM stopped funding Cruise. Work on autonomous vehicles was to be incorporated into development of advanced driver assistance systems for personal vehicles, no longer funding autonomous taxis. The restructuring process is planned to be completed by mid-2025.

In February 2025, the merger of Cruise into GM was completed, with plans to develop technology for personal vehicles rather than robotaxis. GM also announced that it would integrate Cruise technology into its Super Cruise system.

In December 2025, GM attempted to revive Cruise after its failure following the merger, and hired former Tesla exceutive Ronalee Mann in order to embark on a new autonomous vehicle push. This is in an effort to renew its driverless car push.

== Products ==
=== Cruise RP-1 ===
The first product offered by Cruise, before acquisition by GM, was the RP-1, announced in June 2014 as a kit to be available in 2015. The RP-1 was priced at US$10,000, including installation, and was intended to be retrofitted to 2012 and newer Audi A4 and S4 cars. The RP-1 package included a roof-mounted "sensor pod" with cameras, radar, GPS, inertial sensors, and an on-board computer linked to steering, throttle, and brake actuators. Once activated on a limited-access highway, the RP-1 would maintain speed and following distance and keep the car within its lane. Pre-orders were limited to 50 units via a US$1,000 reservation/deposit fee. However, Cruise shifted its strategy in 2015 to focus on the creation of a fully autonomous vehicle platform rather than a retrofit kit, and never released the RP-1.

Cruise initially purchased Nissan Leaf battery-electric vehicles to test automated driving systems, but these were not tested after December 2016.

=== Cruise AV ===
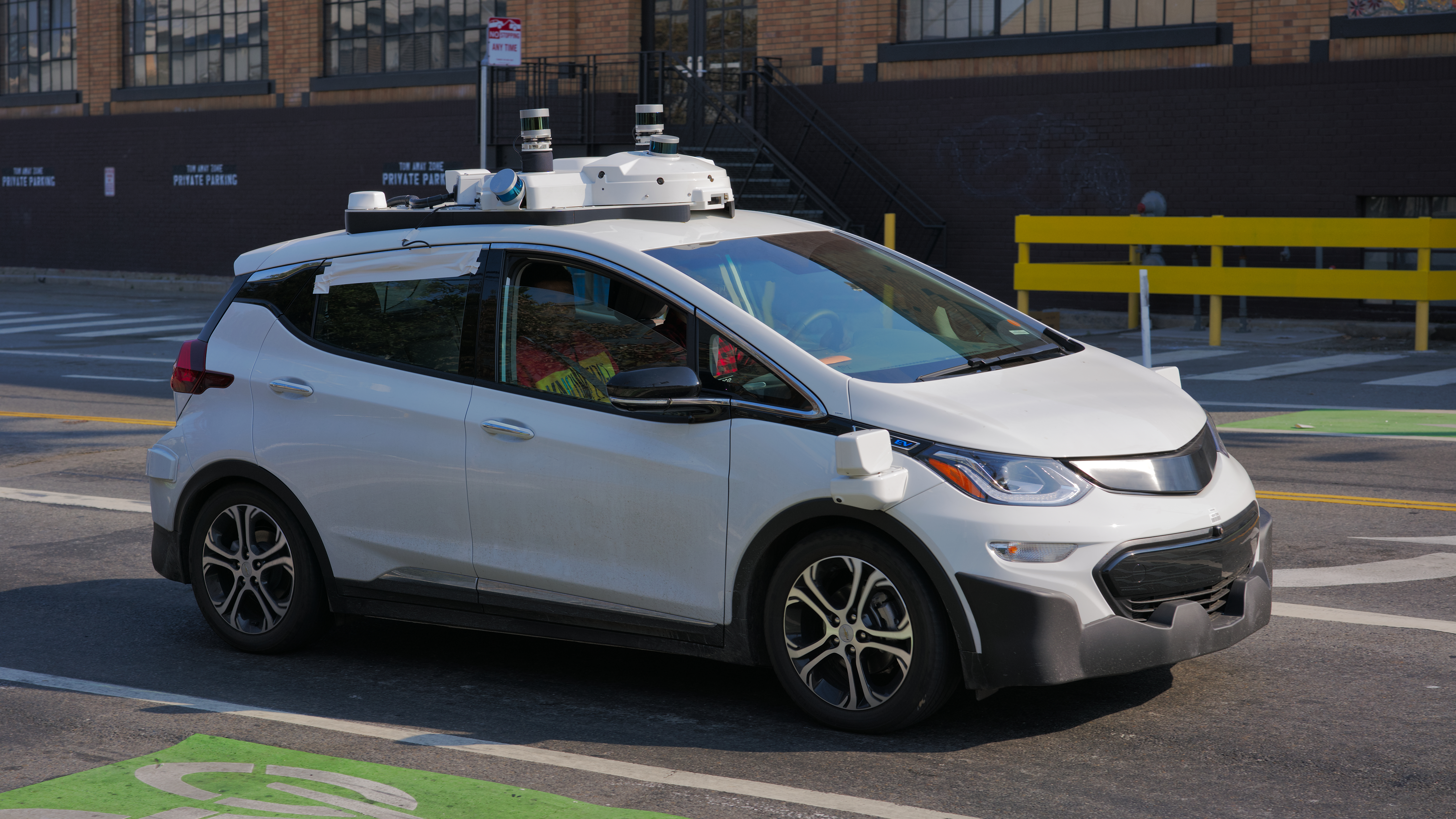
A G3 Cruise AV based on the Chevrolet Bolt undergoing testing in San Francisco. The vehicle is equipped with numerous Velodyne LiDAR sensors.

The Cruise AV is a Chevy Bolt-based autonomous vehicle; the first generation (G1) were modified by Cruise in San Francisco while the subsequent second and third generations (G2 and G3) are manufactured at the Orion Township assembly plant in Michigan. The Cruise AVs feature "drive control algorithms and artificial intelligence created by Cruise." The Cruise AV uses Lidar, radar, and camera sensors; according to Cruise, 40% of its hardware is unique to self-driving.

In 2016, Cruise was conducting testing with a fleet of approximately 30 self-driving G1 Cruise AVs. By June 2017, GM and Cruise had produced an estimated 180 G1 and G2 Cruise AV self-driving vehicles after GM announced the mass production of 130 new G2 Cruise AVs.

In 2017, Cruise was conducting testing on public roads with Cruise AVs in San Francisco, Scottsdale, Arizona, and the metropolitan Detroit area. In early 2017, Cruise released a series of videos showing its self-driving vehicles navigating the streets of San Francisco. In an interview with Fortune in July 2017, Vogt described the videos as "the most technically advanced demonstrations of self-driving cars that have ever been put out there in public." Also in July 2017, Cruise announced "Cruise Anywhere," a program for San Francisco-based employees to use self-driving cars as a rideshare service.

In October 2020, the California Department of Motor Vehicles granted a permit to Cruise for testing fully driverless vehicles. Cruise began testing Cruise AVs without a human safety driver present on the streets of San Francisco in December 2020. In September 2021, Honda started testing program toward launch of Level 4 mobility service Business in Japan, using the G3 Cruise AV.

=== Cruise Origin ===
In January 2020, the company exhibited the Cruise Origin, a Level 4–5 driverless vehicle, intended to be used for a ride hailing service. The Origin is purpose-built as a self-driving vehicle, rather than retrofitted from a non-autonomous vehicle, and contains no manual steering controls. Costing approximately $50,000 to manufacture at scale, the vehicle is all-electric and designed to have a lifespan of 1,000,000 miles (1,600,000 km). Cruise announced that future Origin vehicles would be manufactured at GM's Detroit-Hamtramck plant. It is built on the GM BEV3 platform using Ultium battery technology.

In January 2021, Honda announced a partnership with Cruise to bring the Origin to Japan as part of Honda's future Mobility as a Service (MaaS) business. By September 2022, a prototype of the Japanese version of the Cruise Origin for Tokyo was completed and started testing.

In May 2021, Cruise announced they expected mass production of the Origin driverless shuttle would commence in 2023. In June 2021, Cruise announced it had secured a $5 billion line of credit from General Motors to assist with commercialization and that it had begun assembly of 100 pre-production Origin vehicles for validation testing. Prototype Origin vehicles were spotted testing with human operators at GM-owned proving grounds by July 2022.

The State of California issued testing permits to Cruise in June 2021, allowing the company to provide limited revenue taxi service without human drivers. In February 2022, General Motors and Cruise announced they had petitioned NHTSA for permission to build and deploy the Cruise Origin. Because the Origin does not have manual controls, the NHTSA must issue an exception to the Federal Motor Vehicle Safety Standards to permit operation on public roads; production was ready to begin by February 2023, pending approval of the exception, which had not been granted by September 2023.

Along with the suspension of Cruise's operations, GM paused production of the Origin in November 2023.

== Regulation ==
Cruise received a permit from the California Public Utilities Commission (CPUC) in June 2022, allowing them to operate revenue taxi services in San Francisco using cars without a human driver during limited hours in certain areas of the city. Cruise and Waymo later submitted applications to the CPUC, seeking to expand the commercial operating hours for their robotaxi services in San Francisco. In January 2023, the city of San Francisco wrote to the CPUC, requesting that the applications be denied: "in the months since the Initial Approval [of autonomous taxi services in June 2022], Cruise AVs have made unplanned and unexpected stops in travel lanes, where they obstruct traffic and transit service, and intruding into active emergency response scenes, including fire suppression scenes, creating additional hazardous conditions."

Although draft resolutions approving the expansion petitions were posted by the CPUC in May 2023, the hearing was delayed from June 29 to July 13, pending further review. Before the scheduled July 13 hearing was held, a group named Safe Street Rebel published a viral video to social media, showing that an autonomous vehicle could be disabled temporarily without permanent damage by placing a traffic cone on it and vowing to conduct a "Week of Cone" to demonstrate their concerns. Cruise released a statement in response: "Intentionally obstructing vehicles gets in the way of [efforts to provide free rides, meal deliveries, and retrieve food waste] and risks creating traffic congestion for local residents."

The CPUC delayed the hearing for the permit expansions again to August 10. At that hearing, the CPUC approved the scope expansion by a 3–1 vote, allowing both Cruise and Waymo to offer robotic taxi services at all hours throughout San Francisco.

On October 24, 2023, the California Department of Motor Vehicles suspended Cruise's permit to test and operate autonomous vehicles without a safety driver. According to the suspension order, during their initial meeting with the California DMV on October 3, Cruise had shown a video captured by the AV's onboard cameras that depicted events up to the first complete stop after the Cruise AV struck the pedestrian; Cruise personnel neither described nor showed the remaining recording of the "pullover maneuver" that happened next, during which the pedestrian was dragged for 20 ft (6.1 m) at 7 mph (11 km/h). After learning about the dragging from another government agency, the DMV requested and received the full recording from Cruise. A spokesperson for Cruise disputed the dragging footage was withheld, saying the complete video was shown multiple times. In its press release, the California DMV stated it had determined "the manufacturer's vehicles are not safe for the public's operation" and added "the conduct of autonomous vehicle testing on public roads by the manufacturer [makes] an unreasonable risk to the public". The suspension is effective immediately and does not have a set expiration; the permit will be reinstated after Cruise completes unspecified required actions. The CPUC also suspended Cruise's permit to provide autonomous revenue taxi services the same day, following the DMV.

In May 2024, Cruise began returning its vehicles to publics roads, although an investigation by the National Highway Traffic Safety Administration (NHTSA) into potential flaws in Cruise vehicles remains pending.

== Incidents ==
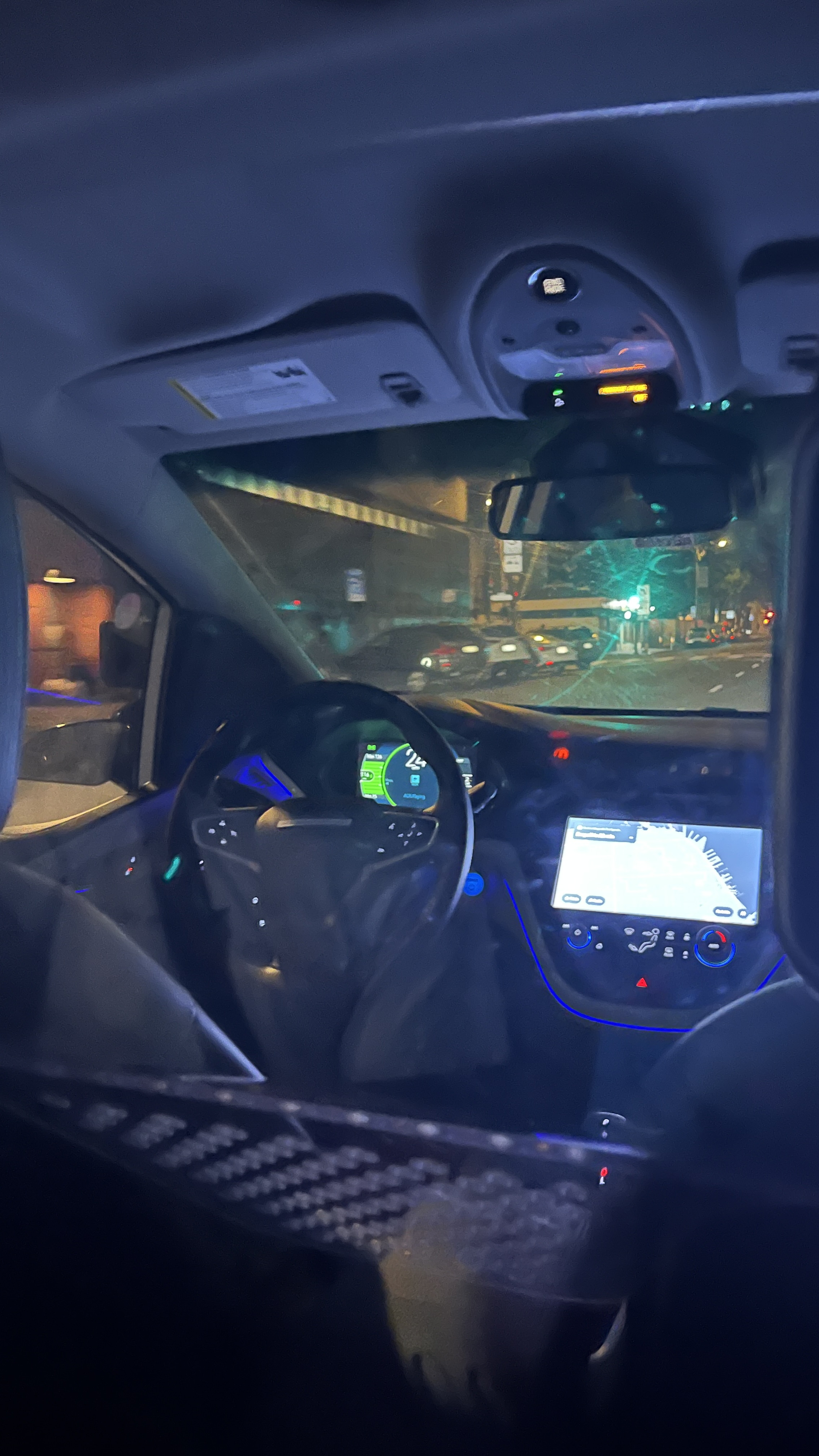
Interior of Cruise autonomous vehicle in San Francisco

=== Interference with police and fire services ===
In April 2022, the San Francisco Police Department (SFPD) stopped a Cruise AV for driving at night without its headlights on. The AV was empty, operating without any human safety attendants or passengers. The vehicle pulled over for SFPD ahead of an intersection, then proceeded across the intersection when an officer walked away from it; on the other side of the intersection, the vehicle stopped again and turned on its hazard lights. According to Cruise, the vehicle operated as intended, moving to the "nearest safe location" for the traffic stop in response to direction from Cruise personnel after the SFPD officer was clear of the vehicle.

Also in April 2022, an empty Cruise AV blocked the path of a San Francisco Fire Department (SFFD) truck responding to a fire at approximately 4 AM; the fire truck was unable to pass a garbage truck doubled-parked in the lane by using the lane for oncoming traffic, as the AV was occupying the oncoming lane. The Cruise AV had stopped and yielded to the fire truck, but was unable to pull to the right to clear the oncoming lane because of parked cars. While a human might have reversed to clear the lane, the Cruise AV did not move out of the way of the fire truck. San Francisco city officials filed a report to the CPUC, stating that "this incident slowed SFFD response to a fire that resulted in property damage and personal injuries."

In June 2023, a video was taken of a Cruise car appearing to block police and fire services from responding to a mass shooting in San Francisco. Cruise denied that the car had blocked the road, stating that emergency response vehicles "were able to proceed around our car". The police and fire departments declined to comment. The San Francisco Fire Department reported there had been 39 incidents between January and June 2023 where Cruise and Waymo robotaxis had blocked first responders.

In August 2023, a San Francisco firetruck collided with a Cruise car while responding to an emergency call with lights and sirens active. As a result of the incident, the California Department of Motor Vehicles requested that "Cruise to immediately reduce its active fleet of operating vehicles by 50% until the investigation is complete and Cruise takes appropriate corrective actions to improve road safety".

City of Austin police and fire departments noted 12 "near miss" incidents occurred with Cruise vehicles between July and November 2023; Austin FD requested that Cruise set up an avoidance area around Fire Station 2, and Austin PD noted the vehicles were unable to recognize hand signals that conflicted with traffic signals.

=== Collisions and blocking traffic ===
On June 3, 2022, a Cruise AV taxi carrying three backseat passengers collided with a Toyota Prius after making an unprotected left turn. According to Cruise, "occupants of both vehicles received medical treatment for allegedly minor injuries". According to GM, the Prius was speeding at the time of the accident and was in the wrong lane. In the aftermath of the incident, Cruise temporarily changed the vehicles' programming to make fewer unprotected left turns.

On June 29, 2022, nearly twenty Cruise AVs blocked traffic for two hours by clustering at the intersection of Gough and Fulton in San Francisco. A Cruise employee sent an anonymous letter to the CPUC, asserting that Cruise loses communication with the automated vehicles "with regularity", sometimes requiring a tow truck for recovery. Additional documented occurrences of immobilized Cruise vehicles in 2022 include May 18 (fleet-wide communications loss), June 21 (Tenderloin), and September 22 (two incidents; one near Sacramento and Leavenworth, the other near Geary and Franklin). San Francisco has recorded 28 incidents reported by 9-1-1 involving autonomous vehicle failures between May 29 and September 5, 2022. In October, US News and World Report reported that Cruise autonomous taxis had blocked traffic in San Francisco on several occasions.

In March 2023, two Cruise AVs operating without passengers drove through a blocked-off intersection in San Francisco, and became entangled with fallen Muni trolleybus power lines. The next day, a passengerless Cruise AV hit the rear end of a Muni bus on Haight Street.

=== Remote assistance requirement ===
In November 2023, The New York Times reported that on average, according to two people familiar with Cruise's operations, a remote operator had to intervene for every 2 1/2 to 5 mi (4.0 to 8.0 km) driven. Vogt confirmed that its vehicles made a call for remote assistance "2–4% of the time on average, in complex urban environments", but clarified that "of those, many are resolved by the AV itself before the human even looks at things". A spokesperson for Cruise added that a call for remote assistance is triggered every 4 to 5 mi (6.4 to 8.0 km). Brad Templeton reported that remote assistance did not mean real-time remote operation by a human, citing reporting from Cruise that stated 98% of remote assistance calls connected to a human operator within 3 seconds, and 80% of remote assistance calls were resolved without action by the human operator. Cruise reported an average distance between disengagements of 95,900 mi (154,300 km) in 2022.

=== Failure to identify obstacles ===
In November 2023, The Intercept reported that Cruise vehicles were unable to consistently recognize and track children and large holes, according to a review of internal safety reports.

=== Pedestrian injuries ===
In August 2023, a Cruise AV starting to proceed through an intersection at 1.4 mph (2.3 km/h) on a green light struck a pedestrian, who subsequently was transported by ambulance after complaining of knee pain.

At approximately 9:30 p.m. (PDT) on October 2, 2023, a pedestrian was struck by a driver traveling south on Fifth Street in San Francisco after crossing the intersection with Market Street. The driver continued without stopping after the pedestrian was tossed over the right side of the car into the adjacent lane, where a Cruise AV nicknamed "Panini", traveling alongside and operating without a safety driver, subsequently also struck and then dragged the pedestrian for approximately 20 ft (6.1 m), coming to a stop with a tire resting on the pedestrian's leg, pinning them beneath the AV. The Jaws of Life were used to free the pedestrian from underneath "Panini". The driver who initially struck the pedestrian fled the scene. According to Cruise, the AV had attempted to avoid striking the pedestrian by first swerving to the right, then stopping immediately after a collision had been detected, followed by attempting to pull over to clear the road, but dragging the victim. In September 2024, the National Highway Traffic and Safety Administration (NHTSA) fined Cruise $1.5 million for failing to disclose the fact that a pedestrian was seriously injured in the October 2023 incident.

=== Investigations ===
In December 2022, the NHTSA opened preliminary investigation PE22-014, citing incidents in which the vehicles may have engaged "in inappropriately hard braking or [became] immobilized." Three specific incidents of hard braking were described, all involving situations in which the automated driving systems, while operating under human supervision, braked hard in response to another vehicle approaching quickly from behind, causing the other vehicle to crash into the automated car. Two letters were sent to Cruise on January 4, 2023, requesting relevant data.

The California DMV opened an investigation in August 2023 following "recent concerning incidents" involving Cruise AVs. The investigation resulted in the immediate suspension of Cruise's permit to test and operate autonomous vehicles, effective October 24, 2023.

In response to two collisions with pedestrians in August and October 2023, the NHTSA opened preliminary investigation PE23-018 on October 16, 2023, and identified two other incidents from publicly posted videos where AVs had encroached on pedestrians in or entering roadways.

== See also ==
- Shared autonomous vehicles
