= Deçan (disambiguation) =

Deçan is a city in west-central Kosovo.

Deçan may also refer to:

- Deçan Municipality, an administrative municipality surrounding Deçan
- Decani, church interior
- Visoki Dečani, a monastery in Deçan

== See also ==
- Decan (disambiguation)
- Dečani (disambiguation)
