= Dan Kan (executive) =

American entrepreneur

Daniel Kan is an American entrepreneur and technology executive. He is the co-founder and chief operating officer of Cruise Automation. Kan and Cruise Senior Director Kyle Vogt are listed as number 7 on Fortune's 2016 40 Under 40 List.

== Background ==
Kan was raised in the Seattle area in a family of entrepreneurs. Kan is the younger brother of Justin Kan, the founder of Justin.tv (which later became Twitch) and Socialcam.

Kan graduated from Seattle's Lakeside School in 2005 Claremont McKenna College in 2009 and planned to pursue a career in finance. Instead, Kan began working for the San Francisco startup UserVoice.

Following his time at UserVoice, Kan founded several companies, including Appetizely and Exec in 2011. Exec operated as an on-demand personal assistant service that most customers used for house cleaning purposes. In 2014, Kan sold Exec to Handy, a San Francisco-based on-demand service company.

== Cruise automation ==
During college, Kan spent a summer interning at Justin.tv where he met Kyle Vogt. Kan later joined Vogt at Cruise Automation in 2014 after the company participated in Y-Combinator, a startup accelerator that mentors up-and-coming entrepreneurs. Cruise was acquired by General Motors in March 2016, reportedly for over $1 billion.
