= Decan (disambiguation) =

Decan may refer to:

- Decan, 36 groups of stars (small constellations) used in Ancient Egyptian, Greek, and Indian astronomy
- Decan (astrology), subdivision of an astrological sign
- Deçan (disambiguation)

== See also ==
- Deccan (disambiguation)
- DKAN (disambiguation)
