= Dečani (disambiguation) =

Dečani or Dečane may refer to:

- Dečani, a town in Kosovo, also claimed by Serbia
- Municipality of Dečani, a municipality in Kosovo, also claimed by Serbia
- Monastery of Dečani, medieval Serbian Orthodox monastery
- Dečani chrysobulls, medieval charter of the Dečani Monastery
- Dečani Chronicle, a historical chronicle of the Dečani Monastery
- Stefan of Dečani, medieval Serbian King, founder of the Dečani Monastery
- Mojsije of Dečani, a Serbian Orthodox monk and printer from the 16th century
- Dečani Bistrica, a river in the Dečani region
- Dečani Mountain, a mountain in the Dečani region

== See also ==
- Decani
- Decane
- Deçan (disambiguation)
