= Dan Ammann =

New Zealand executive

- Born: 1972 (age 53–54); Eureka, Waikato, New Zealand
- Education: University of Waikato
- Occupations: Head of ExxonMobil Low Carbon Solutions; Former CEO of Cruise

Dan Ammann is a New Zealand business executive. He is the former CEO of Cruise, having been the President of General Motors (GM) between 2015 and 2019. Ammann joined GM as treasurer following its 2009 bankruptcy, and also was the company's CFO. Prior to GM, Ammann was a managing director and head of industrial investment banking for Morgan Stanley. Ammann today is head of ExxonMobil Low Carbon Solutions.

== Early life ==
Ammann was born and raised in Eureka, a rural area outside of Hamilton, New Zealand. In 1994, he graduated from the University of Waikato with a bachelor of management studies.

== Investment banking ==
Ammann began his career as an investment banker, starting at Credit Suisse First Boston in 1993. He moved to New York City in 1997, and continued to work for Credit Suisse until moving to Morgan Stanley in 1999. In 2004, he was appointed the position of managing director and head of industrial investment banking for Morgan Stanley. At Morgan Stanley, Ammann worked with clients in the technology, service, and manufacturing industries, helping with mergers, acquisitions, raising capital, and restructuring. He was also the lead advisor on GM's bankruptcy reorganization.

== GM ==
Ammann joined GM in 2010 as the company's treasurer following the company's bankruptcy restructuring. In November 2010, he managed GM's initial public offering. He became the company's CFO in 2011. In addition to helping lead GM's automotive business, he also led GM Financial. Ammann then served as executive vice president of GM, before becoming the company's president in January 2014. After Ammann became president of GM, the New Zealand Herald wrote that he had become "one of the most powerful Kiwi businessmen in the world". As of 2014, he was also one of GM's few test drivers certified to drive at the Nürburgring.

As president, he led product groups including Chevrolet, Cadillac and Cruise. In 2018, Ammann transitioned leadership of the Cadillac brand to GM product chief Mark Reuss in order to spend more time focusing on Cruise. Ammann helped guide the 2016 acquisition of Cruise and was subsequently closely involved with its leadership, growing the company from 40 to around 1,000 employees. During his tenure, Ammann led GM to transition its focus to electric and automated vehicles.

In 2016, Ammann joined the Lyft board of directors when GM invested $500 million in the company. He departed the board two years later.

== Cruise ==
Ammann was the president of GM until 1 January 2019, when he was named the CEO of Cruise, the self-driving automobiles division of GM. As CEO of Cruise, he also remained a member of the GM CEO's leadership team. Ammann left Cruise in December 2021 without explanation from GM or Cruise.

== ExxonMobil ==
In 2022, ExxonMobil announced that Ammann had joined them as the head of the company's low carbon solutions division. ExxonMobil's CEO Darren Woods stated "We welcome Dan to ExxonMobil and will use his knowledge and experience to continue to build our Low Carbon Solutions business".

== Personal life ==
Ammann is married and has two children.
