= Dan Clancy =

American business executive (born 1964)

- Clancy in 2025
- Born: January 11, 1964 (age 62); New Orleans, Louisiana, U.S.
- Education: Duke University (BA); University of Texas at Austin (PhD)
- Known for: CEO of Twitch
- Spouse: Sienna Clancy
- Children: 2

Twitch information
- Channel: DJClancy
- Followers: 120,000
- Last updated: June 5, 2026

Daniel Joseph Clancy (born January 11, 1964) is an American technologist and computer scientist. After working at NASA, he was the engineering director for Google Book Search from 2005 to 2010 and then for other Google products, until leaving in 2014 for Nextdoor.com. From 2014 to 2018, Clancy was vice president of product and engineering at social networking service Nextdoor.

Clancy became president of Twitch Interactive Inc., the operator of Twitch in 2019. In March 2023, he became chief executive officer of Twitch, after previous CEO and co-founder Emmett Shear announced he would step down. As CEO, Clancy reports directly to Amazon VP of Audio, Twitch, and Games Steve Boom.

== Early life ==
After attending Jesuit High School in New Orleans, Louisiana, Clancy received a BA in computer science and theatre from Duke University in 1985. He has a PhD in artificial intelligence from the University of Texas at Austin. While in school, Clancy worked at Trilogy, Xerox Webster Research center and NASA's Jet Propulsion Laboratory.

Clancy has two adult children with his wife Sienna. One of them, Savannah Clancy, is a folk singer-songwriter based in White Salmon, Washington. Daniel and Savannah are known to stream together on Twitch.

== Career ==
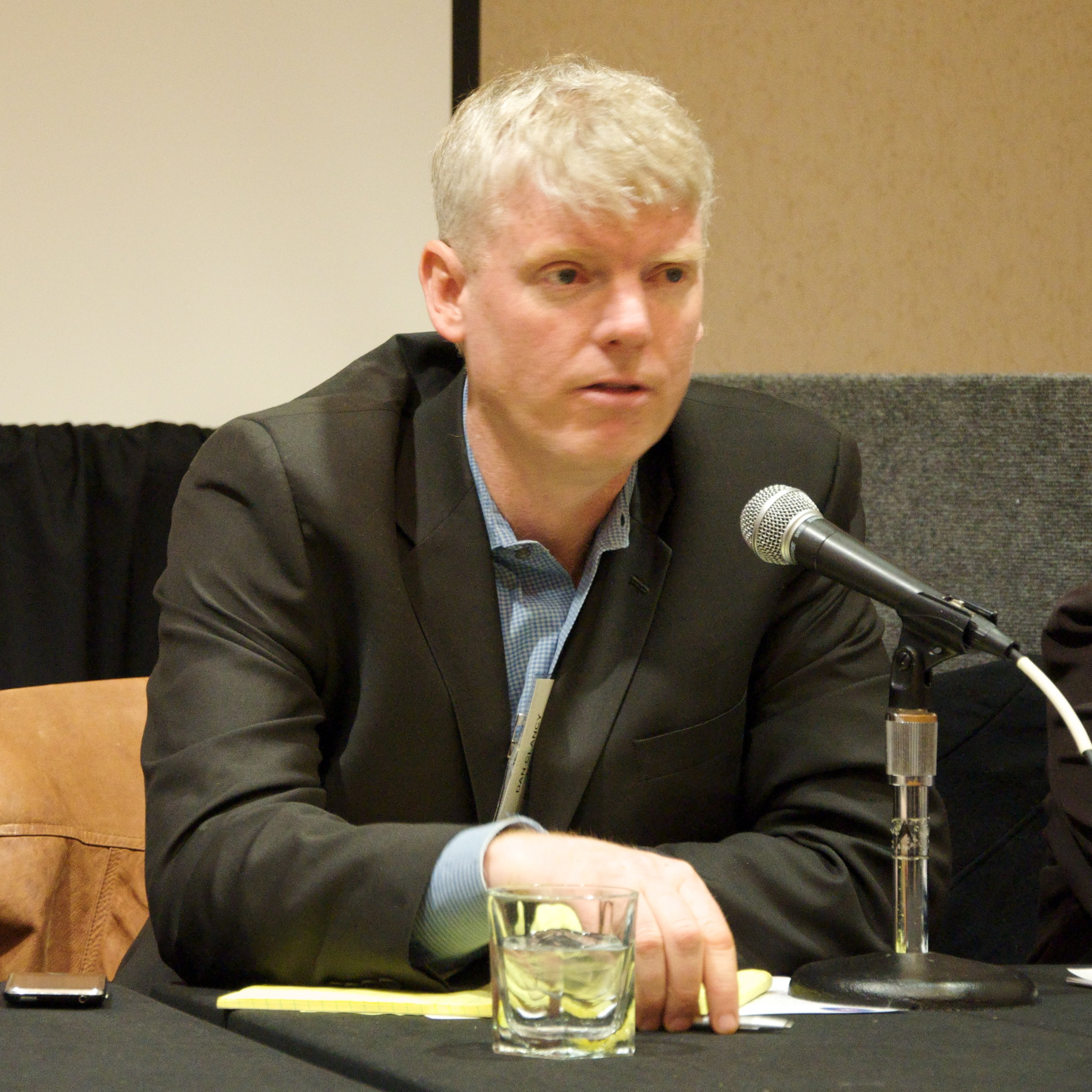
Dan Clancy at ALA Midwinter Conference, Denver (January 24, 2009)

=== NASA ===
Clancy worked in different positions at NASA, first as a researcher on Integrated Health Management, autonomy, and robotics in 1998. In 2000 Clancy became chief of the Computational Sciences Division at NASA Ames Research Center. Since 2003 he served as director of the Exploration Technologies Directorate, also at Ames. The directorate supports over 700 people researching both robotic and human exploration missions. It is responsible for areas including intelligent systems, nanotechnology, entry systems and others. At NASA, Clancy participated in the team that developed the agency's plan to return men to the Moon and eventually Mars. Clancy was also head of information sciences and technology at NASA, leading teams related to artificial intelligence.

=== Google ===
In 2005, Clancy left NASA for Google, where he worked on International Search Quality, before becoming Engineering Lead for Google Book Search. There he worked on scaling the core technology that allowed Google to scan millions of books each year, as well as optimizing search rank results. While working with Google, Clancy took an active role in negotiating the Google Book Search copyright lawsuit settlement, and has been a spokesperson for Google in public statements about the settlement.

In 2008, he became Engineering Lead at Google Search Properties along with Jen Fitzpatrick, with responsibility for all of Google's search products, like Image Search, Product Search, Google News, Book Search, Google Finance or Google Video, with a continued focus on Book Search as well as Google News.

From 2010 to 2012, Clancy oversaw the Engineering and Product Lead divisions at YouTube, again focusing on search as well as infrastructure. He then became Senior Director for Research at Google, leading a variety of research teams including Sibyl, Googles massively parallel machine learning program, Human Computer Interaction, personalization and recommendations, and the Course Builder team & EdX partnership.

=== Nextdoor ===
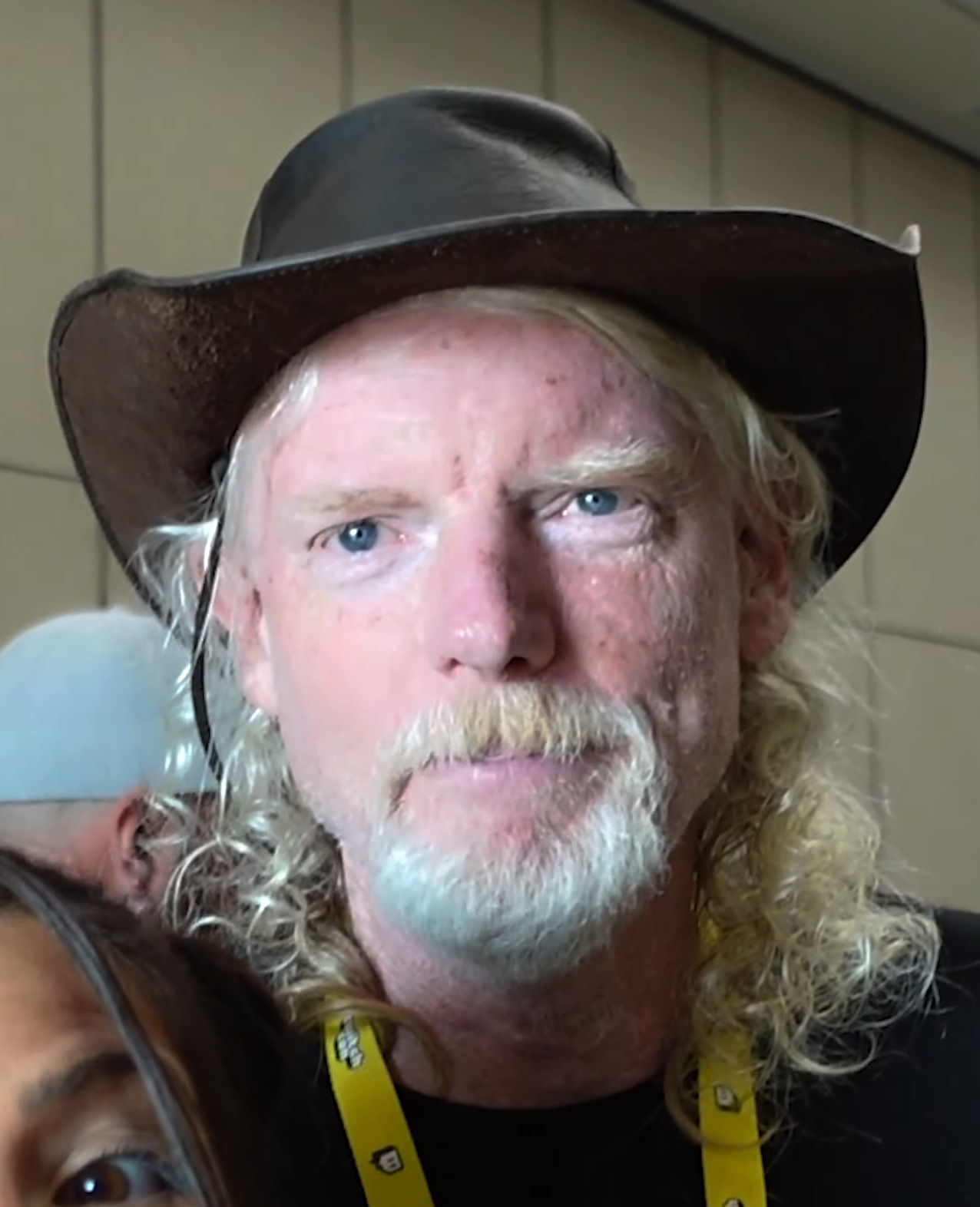
Dan Clancy at Twitchcon San Diego in 2022

In 2014, Clancy joined social media site Nextdoor as Vice President of product and engineering. As part of the executive team, he was responsible for leading the product, engineering and data science teams. He was Nextdoor's first executive hire outside of its founding team. Clancy left Nextdoor in 2018.

=== Twitch ===
In 2019, Clancy joined Twitch, initially as Vice President of creator and community experience, reporting to CEO Emmett Shear. He later became President of the Amazon-owned parent company of Twitch, Twitch Interactive, while also leading the product, engineering and go-to market functions.

On September 21, 2022, Clancy announced that Twitch would lower the subscription split all streamers receive to 50/50, from the previous 70/30 for select partners, reportedly to ensure Twitch would not operate at a loss. On the same day, Bloomberg reported that Twitch's Vice President of global creators, Constance Knight, would be leaving the company. The company's chief content officer Mike Aragon and chief operating officer Sara Clemens had also left earlier the same year. The change was criticized by streamers, as well as the head of competitor YouTube Gaming, Ryan Wyatt, saying "the creator should be getting a disproportionate amount—this shouldn’t even be up for debate". YouTube Gaming offers a 70/30 split, while platforms like OnlyFans or Patreon take 20% or less. Twitch streamer PointCrow wrote "The fact Twitch's solution to monetary problems is to cut creator pay rather than facilitate a better platform so more viewers visit the live-streaming site is incredibly worrying". On June 15, 2023, Twitch announced partners with 350 non-gifted recurring subscriptions for three sequential months will qualify for the Partner Plus Program. Eligible partners will receive a 70/30 split for 12 months applicable to their first $100,000 of annual income before returning to a 50/50 split.

On March 16, 2023, Clancy became CEO of Twitch, after previous CEO and Justin.tv co-founder Emmett Shear announced he would step down after 16 years at the company. Both Shear and Clancy have been described as "more product-focused than creator-focused". On March 20, Clancy announced that Twitch would be laying off 400 employees, as part of Amazon-wide layoffs affecting 9,000 workers across the company. In January 2024, another round of layoffs totaling 500 people (35% of staff) was announced.
