= Steve Boom =

American executive (born 1968)

- Born: 1968 (age 57–58)
- Citizenship: U.S., Belgium
- Education: Stanford University (BS, AB); Harvard University (JD)
- Occupations: Vice President of Audio, Twitch & Games at Amazon; Chairman of MusiCares

Steve Boom is Vice President of Audio (encompassing Amazon Music, Audible, and Wondery), Twitch & Games at Amazon. Before that, he was the vice president of Amazon Music.

== Early career ==
Boom received a JD from Harvard Law School in 1994. After law school, Boom began his career as an attorney at Arnold & Porter in Washington, D.C., and then Venture Law Group in Silicon Valley, advising software and internet startups.

He joined Yahoo Inc. in 1998 as director of business development for Yahoo Europe. In October 2002, he became the company's senior vice president of business and enterprise services. Boom worked at Yahoo for 10 years, departing in 2008 as senior vice president of the Connected Life division, where he managed the company's mobile and broadband businesses. Boom led the rollout of Yahoo's mobile advertising network and Yahoo! Go for Mobile 2.0. He also played a role in Yahoo's investment in speech recognition company Vlingo.

In January 2009, Boom became CEO of mig33, a mobile social networking service popular primarily outside the U.S. He transitioned to the executive chairman role in March 2010. Boom joined Loopt as its president in August 2010 and was also an adviser to video service Vuclip.

== Amazon ==
Boom joined Amazon in 2012 to develop and launch the Amazon Music business. He led the transition of the business from selling MP3 music downloads to providing music streaming, including the introduction of Amazon Prime Music in 2014 and the rollout of the Amazon Music Unlimited streaming service in 2016. In January 2020, Boom reported that Amazon Music had 55 million users. As head of Amazon Music, he led the 2021 acquisitions of podcast network Wondery and podcast hosting and advertising company Art19 as Amazon Music expanded into podcasts. In 2022, Boom also led the expansion of the service to offer streaming of its entire catalog to Amazon Prime members and the rollout of Amazon Music Live, a concert series airing on Amazon Prime Video and Twitch following Thursday Night Football.

With the retirement of Senior Vice President Jeff Blackburn in December 2022, Boom took on expanded leadership to include Audible, Twitch and Amazon Games, reporting to Amazon CEO Andy Jassy. Ryan Redington, general manager of Amazon Music, and Dan Clancy, CEO of Twitch, report to Boom.

Additionally, Boom is the longest-running chairman of music aid organization MusiCares, first joining the organization's board in 2017. In this role, he helped create the MusiCares COVID-19 Relief Fund and guide distribution of $35 million in COVID-19 pandemic aid.
