= Morgpie =

American Twitch streamer and pornographic actress

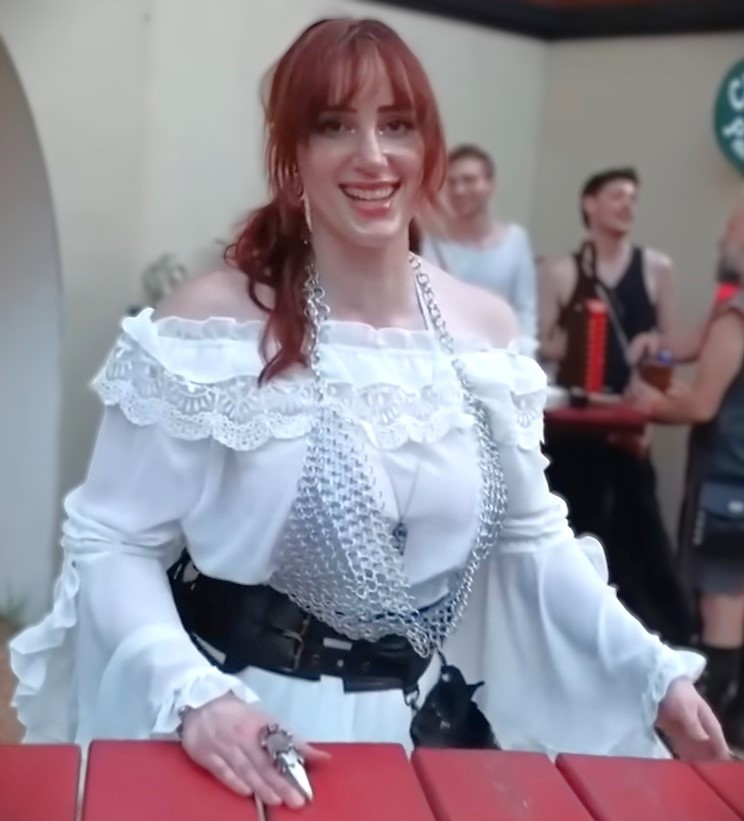
- Morgpie in 2025
- Other names: Bigwomb; Bigguswombus
- Occupations: Streamer; model; pornographic film actress

Instagram information
- Page: Morgpie
- Years active: 2021–present
- Genres: Cosplay; modeling
- Followers: 1.3 million

TikTok information
- Page: Mogrpie
- Followers: 578 thousand

Twitch information
- Channel: morgpie
- Genres: Gaming; health and fitness
- Followers: 421 thousand
- Last updated: October 28, 2026

Morgpie is an American Twitch streamer, OnlyFans model, startup founder, and pornographic film actress. A content creator, she is best known for her popularization of sexually suggestive niche genres on Twitch, referred to as metas by the platform's community.

She began creating content online as an amateur pornographic actress, before becoming an OnlyFans model and a Twitch streamer. As an adult content creator, she has received various industry award nominations.

In 2023 and 2024, her "topless" and green-screen metas on Twitch featured implied nudity and the use of body parts as a green-screen, respectively. These genres caught on as trends, sparking similar suggestive content to gain popularity on the platform. Her streams proved to be provocative, polarizing users with some arguing her content was skirting the line regarding Twitch's content policies, while others pointed out a perceived double standard between male and female streamers. The community furor raised on the platform around the metas she spawned led to her temporary ban and multiple modifications to Twitch's guidelines.

== Career ==
Morgpie is a model and streamer on OnlyFans and Twitch, respectively. Regarding the latter, she produces streams in the gaming and fitness genres. Additionally, she is a cosplayer. She is also a pornographic actress, streaming on the platform Jerkmate, and having won two Pornhub Awards: one for "Top Squirting Performer" in 2023, and another for "Favorite Fitness Model" in 2024. In 2026, Morgpie co-founded Fanlock, a content protection platform for digital creators, alongside Zander Small, having previously spent thousands of dollars a month on DMCA services that failed to keep leaks and deepfakes of her offline.

=== Twitch content metas ===
In late 2023 and early 2024, Morgpie garnered attention after pushing the boundaries of the Twitch platform's guidelines. She fledged risqué and niche content genres on the service, colloquially referred to as a meta. On December 8, 2023, Morgpie went viral for her "topless" meta, in which she streamed gameplay while appearing to be nude. Though wearing a tube top and jeans, her streams carried an implied nudity due to the framing of her camera, showing her bare shoulders, upper chest, and cleavage but cut off just above her nipples. Not explicitly violating platform rules, her content was technically within Twitch's guidelines on adult female nudity at the time, which prohibited streamers from showing "female-presenting breasts with exposed nipples", with an exception for breastfeeding. She credited fellow streamer AsianBunny for the meta, citing her as an influence to incorporate it into her own streams.

Examples of Morgpie's "topless" meta (pictured in top image), which was noted for its suggestive implied nudity, and her green-screen meta (bottom), which made use of monochrome outfits to render her buttocks as a green-screen overlay for gameplay.

Some users felt Morgpie was pushing the platform's boundaries too far, toeing the line of Twitch's guidelines. On December 11, her account was banned following a topless charity stream to raise money for Doctors without Borders. Morgpie felt that community uproar around her content played a large role in her ban, asserting that her topless meta was within terms of service (TOS), and stating in an interview that she previously read the platform's TOS, attempting to work within its confines. Her ban was short-lived, being lifted around two days later. In the interim, Twitch made changes to their policies allowing for "artistic depictions of nudity", as well as "deliberately highlighted breasts, buttocks or pelvic region" as long as the content was properly labeled. However, the platform expeditiously rolled back its policy update the following day. After she was unbanned, she tweeted that the ban was not a result of the meta itself, but rather her "off-screen [boob] clapping". In January 2024, Twitch again updated their policies, directly nixing the meta as streamers became prohibited to "imply or suggest that they are fully or partially nude".

In March 2024, Morgpie experimented with another meta, wearing a monochrome outfit and using her body as a green-screen. She made particular use of her buttocks as the green-screen projection area, such as in one stream where she reacted to a video by fellow streamer MoistCr1tikal. Debuting the style on March 12, she further propelled the meta's popularity a couple of days later following a Fortnite stream, with her gameplay overlaid on her buttocks. In another stream, she used a green-screen cut-out shirt, causing her head and breasts to be the only visible parts of her body. Like with the topless meta, this style of content proved to be controversial and led to a ban on "content that focuses on intimate body parts for a prolonged period of time" going into effect on March 29.

In May 2026, Morgpie was again temporarily suspended from Twitch after painting the soles of her feet and using them as a green screen overlay for gameplay of Dark Souls III.

=== Reception and influence ===
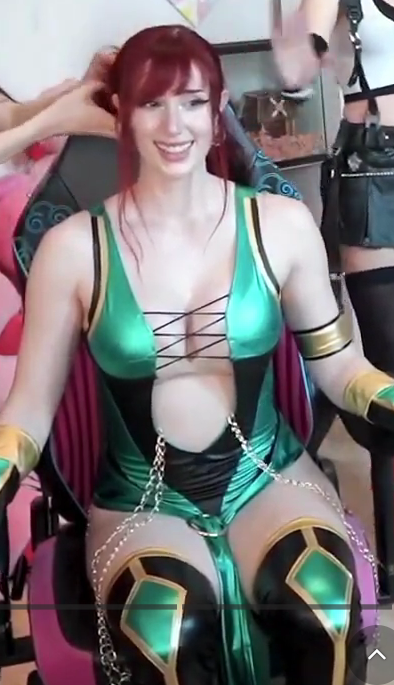
Morgpie in 2024

Morgpie polarized users with her topless meta. Male users in particular were noted by Morgan Sung of TechCrunch to be critical of implied nude content. Previously banned user Gross Gore "derided topless meta creators [...] as a danger to children". Conversely, MoistCr1tikal called Morgpie the "most influential" streamer on the platform at the time, opining that "she defines the meta on Twitch" and adding that the "Twitch policy team has to constantly be monitoring her at her mercy". Other male users parodied the meta. After the platform quickly reverted the policies they implemented during her ban, those critical of her ban felt Twitch's rationale remained unclear. Passionfruit noted that Twitch received criticism regarding the multiple updates of their policies to prohibit implied nudity. Some users felt that the guideline updates would only negatively affect streamers with a smaller following. Meanwhile, other users, including Twitch affiliate Ren_Nyx, raised concerns over the perceived double standard between male and female-presenting streamers. They argued the policy change in January 2024 was unfairly gendered, applying only to female-presenting streamers.

As the topless meta became a popular trend in late 2023, it attracted copycats and spurred the onset of the "black bar" meta, in which streamers censored their breasts and genitals with black bars or other filters. The topless meta also drew comparisons to the previous "hot tub" meta, popularized by Amouranth in 2021, which featured streamers suggestively lounging in Jacuzzis. Her buttocks green-screen meta also led to copycat streamers, who experimented with chroma keying various other body parts or using "NSFW anime images". VTubers were among those influenced by the trend, with PC Gamer citing one using a virtual avatar of "an anime fox girl playing through a literal boob window". Writing for the Daily Dot, Grace Stanley opined positively on Morgpie's metas, stating "She deserves awards, accolades, flowers even. Even if Twitch implemented a Catholic-school-level dress code, Morgpie would no doubt find a way to go viral for doing something funny".

== Awards and nominations ==
Year	Ceremony	Category	Result	Ref.
2022	4th Pornhub Awards	Most Popular Verified Amateur	Nominated	
2022	4th Pornhub Awards	Top Anal Performer	Nominated	
2022	AltPorn Awards	Best Clip Artist of the Year	Nominated	
2023	5th Pornhub Awards	Most Popular Amateur Model	Nominated	
2023	5th Pornhub Awards	Top Female Solo Performer	Nominated	
2023	5th Pornhub Awards	Top Squirting Performer	Won	
2024	6th Pornhub Awards	Favorite Fitness Model	Won	
2024	6th Pornhub Awards	Top Female Solo Performer	Nominated	
