= Twitch (service) =

American live-streaming platform

Twitch Interactive Inc.

- Screenshot Homepage in July 2025
- Company type: Subsidiary
- Website type: Live streaming; Video on demand
- Predecessor: Justin.tv
- Area served: Worldwide
- Founders: Justin Kan; Emmett Shear; Michael Seibel; Kyle Vogt; Kevin Lin
- Key people: Dan Clancy (CEO); Laura Lee (CCO); Steve Boom (VP of Audio, Twitch, and Games at Amazon)
- Parent: Amazon Entertainment (Amazon)
- Website: twitch.tv
- IPv6 support: No
- Commercial: Yes
- Registration: Optional
- Launched: June 6, 2011; 15 years ago
- Current status: Active
- Written in: Go
- ASN: 46489

Twitch is an American video live-streaming service popular in video games, including broadcasts of esports competitions. It also offers music broadcasts, creative content, and "in real life" streams. Twitch is operated by Twitch Interactive, a subsidiary of Amazon Entertainment, a division of Amazon. It was introduced in June 2011 as a spin-off of the general-interest streaming platform Justin.tv.

Content on the site can be viewed either live or via video on demand. The games shown on Twitch's current homepage are listed according to audience preference and include genres such as real-time strategy games, fighting games, racing games, and first-person shooters.

The popularity of Twitch eclipsed that of Justin.tv. In October 2013, the website had 45 million unique viewers, and by February 2014, it was considered the fourth-largest source of peak Internet traffic in the United States. At the same time, Justin.tv's parent company was re-branded as Twitch Interactive to represent the shift in focus when Justin.tv was getting shut down in August 2014. The same month, the service was acquired by Amazon for US$970 million, which later led to the introduction of synergies with the company's subscription service Amazon Prime.

By 2015, Twitch had more than 100 million viewers per month. In 2017, Twitch remained the leading live-streaming video service for video games in the US, and had an advantage over YouTube Gaming, which shut down its standalone app in May 2019. As of February 2020, it had three million broadcasters monthly and 15 million active users daily, with 1.4 million average concurrent users. As of May 2018, Twitch had over 27,000 partner channels. As of January 2025, Twitch was the 30th-most-visited website in the world with 23.46% of its traffic coming from the United States, followed by Russia with 8.87%, Germany with 7.08% and France with 6.26%. In late 2023, Twitch announced that it would stop operating in South Korea in 2024 because of its network fee policy, citing prohibitive costs.

== History ==
=== Founding and initial growth (2007–2013) ===
When Justin.tv was launched in 2007 by Justin Kan and Emmett Shear, two recent Yale graduates, the site was divided into several content categories. The gaming category grew especially fast, and became the most popular content on the site. In June 2011, the company decided to spin off the gaming content as TwitchTV, inspired by the term twitch gameplay. It launched officially in public beta on June 6, 2011. Since then, Twitch has attracted more than 35 million unique visitors a month. Twitch had about 80 employees in June 2013, which increased to 100 by December 2013. The company was headquartered in San Francisco's Financial District.

Twitch has been supported by significant investments of venture capital, with US$15 million in 2012 (on top of US$7 million originally raised for Justin.tv), and US$20 million in 2013. Investors during three rounds of fund raising leading up to the end of 2013 included Draper Associates, Bessemer Venture Partners and Thrive Capital. In addition to the influx of venture funding, it was believed in 2013 that the company had become profitable.

Especially since the shutdown of its direct competitor Own3d.tv in early 2013, Twitch has become the most popular e-sports streaming service by a large margin, leading some to conclude that the website has a "near monopoly on the market". Competing video services, such as YouTube and Dailymotion, began to increase the prominence of their gaming content to compete, but have had a much smaller impact so far. As of mid-2013, there were over 43 million viewers on Twitch monthly, with the average viewer watching an hour and a half a day. By February 2014, Twitch was the fourth largest source of Internet traffic during peak times in the United States, behind Netflix, Google, and Apple. Twitch made up 1.8% of total US Internet traffic during peak periods.

In late 2013, particularly due to increasing viewership, Twitch had issues with lag and low frame rates in Europe. Twitch has subsequently added new servers in the region. Also in order to address these problems, Twitch implemented a new video system shown to be more efficient than the previous system. Initially, the new video system was criticized by users because it caused a significant stream delay, interfering with broadcaster–viewer interaction. Twitch staff said that the increased delay was likely temporary and at the time, was an acceptable trade-off for the decrease in buffering.

=== Growth, YouTube acquisition speculation (2014) ===
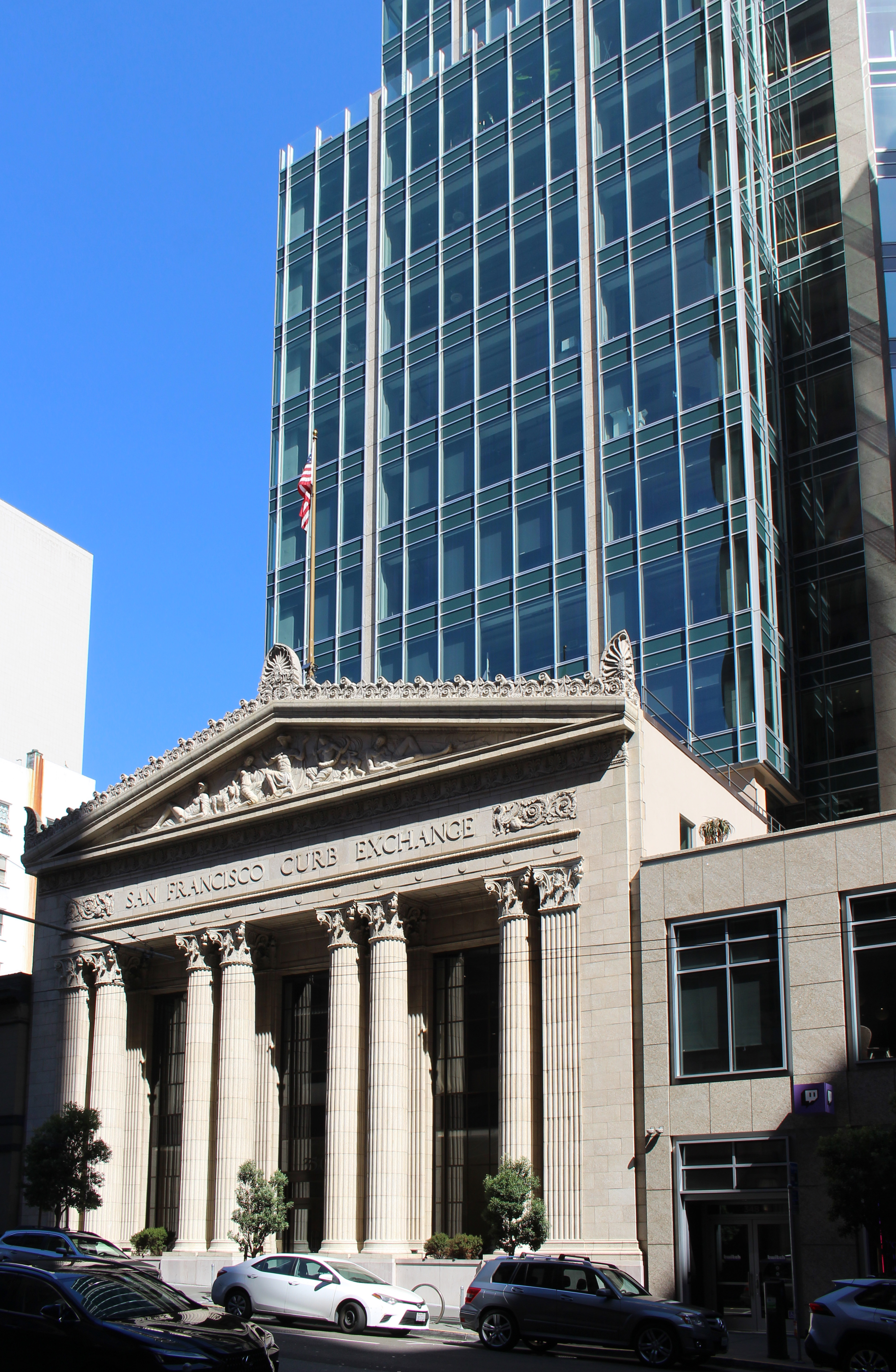
Twitch headquarters at 350 Bush Street in San Francisco (which reuses the facade of the old San Francisco Curb Exchange as an entrance hall for the modern office tower behind it)

On February 10, 2014, Twitch's parent company (Justin.tv, Inc.) was renamed Twitch Interactive, reflecting the increased prominence of the service over Justin.tv as the company's main business. That same month, a stream known as Twitch Plays Pokémon, a crowdsourced attempt to play Pokémon Red using a system translating chat commands into game controls, went viral. By February 17, the channel reached over 6.5 million total views and averaged concurrent viewership between 60 and 70,000 viewers with at least 10% participating. Vice President of Marketing Matthew DiPietro praised the stream as "one more example of how video games have become a platform for entertainment and creativity that extends WAY beyond the original intent of the game creator. By merging a video game, live video and a participatory experience, the broadcaster has created an entertainment hybrid custom made for the Twitch community. This is a wonderful proof of concept that we hope to see more of in the future." Beginning with its 2014 edition, Twitch was made the official live-streaming platform of the Electronic Entertainment Expo.

On May 18, 2014, Variety first reported that Google had reached a preliminary deal to acquire Twitch through its YouTube subsidiary for approximately US$1 billion.

On August 5, 2014, the original Justin.tv site suddenly ceased operations, citing a need to focus resources entirely on Twitch. On August 6, 2014, Twitch introduced an updated archive system, with multi-platform access to highlights from past broadcasts by a channel, higher quality video, increased server backups, and a new Video Manager interface for managing past broadcasts and compiling "highlights" from broadcasts that can also be exported to YouTube. Due to technological limitations and resource requirements, the new system contained several regressions; the option to archive complete broadcasts on an indefinite basis ("save forever") was removed, meaning that they can only be retained for a maximum of 14 days, or 60 for partners and Turbo subscribers. While compiled highlights can be archived indefinitely, they were limited to two hours in length. In addition, Twitch introduced a copyright fingerprinting system that would mute audio in archived clips if it detected a copyrighted song in the stream.

=== Amazon subsidiary (2014–present) ===
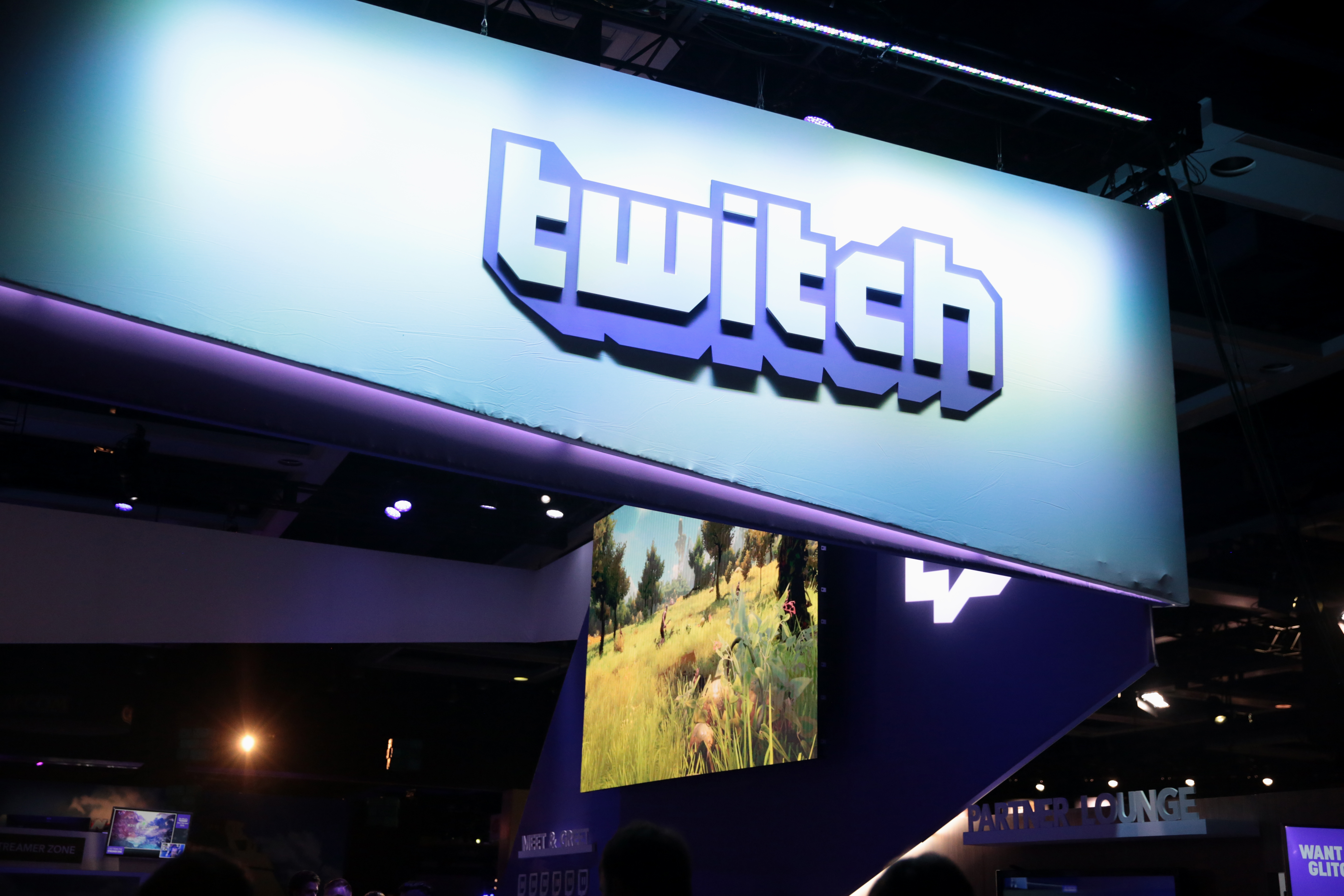
Twitch booth at the 2018 PAX West

On August 25, 2014, Amazon acquired Twitch Interactive for US$970 million in an all-cash deal. Sources reported that the rumoured Google deal had fallen through and allowed Amazon to make the bid, with Forbes reporting that Google had backed out of the deal due to potential antitrust concerns surrounding it and its existing ownership of YouTube. The acquisition closed on September 25, 2014. Take-Two Interactive, which owned a 2% stake at the time of the acquisition, made a windfall of $22 million.

Under Amazon, Shear continued as chief executive officer of Twitch Interactive, with Sara Clemens added to the executive team as chief operating officer in January 2018. Shear touted the Amazon Web Services platform as an "attractive" aspect of the deal, and that Amazon had "built relationships with the big players in media", which could be used to the service's advantage—particularly in the realm of content licensing. The purchase of Twitch marked the third recent video gaming–oriented acquisition by Amazon, which had previously acquired the developers Reflexive Entertainment and Double Helix Games.

On December 9, 2014, Twitch announced it had acquired GoodGame Agency, an organisation that owns the esports teams Evil Geniuses and Alliance. In March 2015, Twitch reset all user passwords and disabled all connections to external Twitter and YouTube accounts after the service reported that someone had gained "unauthorised access" to the user information of some Twitch users.

In June 2016, Twitch added a new feature known as "Cheering", a special form of emoticon purchased as a microtransaction using an in-site currency known as "Bits". Bits are bought using Amazon Payments, and cheers act as donations to the channel. Users also earn badges within a channel based on how much they have cheered.

On August 1, 2016, it was reported that Twitch had signed a lease for 185,000 square feet (17,187 m^{2}) in a new office tower to be constructed at 350 Bush Street in San Francisco.

On August 16, 2016, Twitch acquired Curse LLC, an operator of online video gaming communities and gaming-oriented VoIP software. In December 2016, GoodGame Agency was divested by Amazon to their respective members due to conflict of interest concerns. On September 30, 2016, Twitch announced Twitch Prime, a service which provides premium features that are exclusive to users who have an active Amazon Prime subscription. This included advertising-free streaming, monthly offers of free add-on content ("Game Loot"), and game discounts. Games included with the game loot rewards were Apex Legends, Legends of Runeterra, FIFA Ultimate Team, Teamfight Tactics, Mobile Legends: Bang Bang, Doom Eternal, and more.

In December 2016, Twitch announced a semi-automated chat moderation tool (AutoMod), which uses natural language processing and machine learning to set aside potentially unwanted content for human review. In February 2017, Twitch announced the Twitch Game Store, a digital distribution platform that would expose digital purchases of games within the site's browsing interface. When streaming games available on the store, partnered channels could display a referral link to purchase the game—receiving a 5% commission. Users also received a "Twitch Crate" on every purchase, which included Bits and a collection of random chat emotes.

In August 2017, Twitch announced it had acquired video indexing platform ClipMine. In March 2018, Twitch Prime was expanded with free monthly game bundles, including games from its Indie Amplifier program. Indie Amplifier had users vote for a game to be given away by Prime.

On August 20, 2018, Twitch announced that it will no longer offer advertising-free access to the entire service to Amazon Prime subscribers, with this privilege requiring the separate "Twitch Turbo" subscription or an individual channel subscription. This privilege ended for new customers effective September 14, 2018, and for existing customers October 2018. In October 2018, Twitch announced Amazon Blacksmith, a new extension allowing broadcasters to configure displays of products associated with their streams with Amazon affiliate links. On November 27, 2018, Twitch discontinued the Game Store service, citing that it did not generate as much additional revenue for partners as it had hoped, and new revenue opportunities such as Amazon Blacksmith. Users retain access to their purchased games. On December 12, 2018, Fandom, Inc. had reached an agreement to acquire Curse Media, a spin-off of Curse, from Twitch Interactive for an undisclosed amount. Curse was dissolved and its assets were moved under Twitch Interactive.

Twitch's new headquarters at 350 Bush Street opened in August 2019. To comply with historic preservation requirements, the developer kept the front facade of the San Francisco Curb Exchange, but tore down everything behind the facade, and built a reconstruction of the old trading hall through which visitors must walk to reach the modern high-rise office tower behind it.

Twitch acquired the Internet Games Database (IGDb), a user-driven website similar in functionality to Internet Movie Database (IMDb) to catalog details of video games in September 2019. Twitch plans to use the database service to improve its own internal search features and help users find games they are interested in. On September 26, 2019, Twitch unveiled a new logo and updated site design. The design is accompanied by a new advertising campaign, "You're already one of us", which will seek to promote the platform's community members. Twitch began signing exclusivity deals with high-profile streamers in December 2019.

Twitch introduced a Safety Advisory Council in May 2020, made up from streamers, academics, and think tanks, with a goal to develop guidelines for moderation, work-life balance, and safeguarding the interests of marginalized communities for the platform. The announcement attracted controversy, and CEO Emmett Shear later clarified that the role of the council was purely advisory. On June 22, 2020, Twitch Interactive sold CurseForge to Overwolf for an undisclosed sum. In August 2020, Twitch Prime was renamed Prime Gaming, aligning it closer with the Amazon Prime family of services. In 2020, Twitch sold Union For Gamers to Magic Find.

In May 2021, Twitch announced that it would introduce over 350 new tags to categorize streams, including finer tags for gender identity, sexual identity, and disabilities, as well as tags for other types of themes (such as virtual streamers). The disability and LGBT-oriented tags were developed in consultation with the video game accessibility charities AbleGamers and SpecialEffect, and the LGBT organizations GLAAD and The Trevor Project.

On October 6, 2021, an anonymous hacker reportedly leaked "the entirety" of Twitch, including its source code of the Twitch client and APIs, and details of the payouts made to almost 2.4 million streamers since August 2019. The user posted a 128GB torrent link to 4chan and said that the leak, which includes source code from almost 6,000 internal Git repositories, is also "part one" of a larger release. The leak also included details of plans for a digital storefront under the codename of "Vapor" meant to be a competitor to Steam along with details on payment received by streamers for their work on Twitch. Twitch verified they had suffered a data leak which they attributed to a server misconfiguration used by a "malicious third party". While Twitch found no indication of login credentials or credit card information to have been taken in the breach, the company reset all stream keys as a precaution.

On August 23, 2022, Twitch announced that it would no longer enforce its exclusivity agreement, allowing Twitch streamers to livestream on other streaming platforms. The announcement noted that simulcasting on Twitch and other "Twitch-like" streaming platforms was still prohibited; however, an exemption to the simulcasting restriction was applied to short-form streaming platforms such as Instagram and TikTok. Despite the specific mention of restrictions on simulcasting, former Twitch employees noted that Twitch would likely not enforce the restriction, as doing so would be very difficult, and they had not been enforcing it for several months prior to the announcement. After the announcement, many high-profile streamers who were limited by exclusivity, such as Ninja and Pokimane, started streaming on other platforms.

On September 21, 2022, Twitch announced it would be reducing the subscription revenue earned by large streamers. Though most streamers get a 50% of revenue from subscriptions, some larger streamers have premium subscription terms, which give them 70% of subscription revenue. The new change, set to take effect on June 1, 2023, would mean premium streamers would keep 70% of the first $100,000 earned from subscriptions, after which their cut would be lowered to 50%. The announcement came after Twitch declined a popular request for all streamers to have 70% subscription revenue, which many noted is the same revenue already offered by YouTube. Twitch President Dan Clancy justified the change in a statement issued on Twitch's blog, stating it was done to cover Twitch's operating costs, noting the premium 70% split stopped being offered to new streamers over a year prior, and pointing to alternate streamer revenue sources that would not be affected by the subscription revenue reductions, such as Prime Subs or advertisement breaks. Though Clancy claimed 90% of streamers would not be affected by the revenue reduction, the change drew criticism from many streamers, who viewed it as harmful to the security of streaming careers and more beneficial to Twitch and its advertisers than their users, with several streamers expressing doubt at Clancy's claims of Twitch's high operating costs, and noting that Twitch already has alternative revenue sources that make reducing streamer revenue unnecessary. The announcement led to some streamers considering leaving Twitch or organizing boycotts.

In December 2022, Amazon Senior Vice President Jeff Blackburn retired and was replaced by Steve Boom as Vice President of Audio, Twitch, and Games. Twitch CEO Dan Clancy reports directly to Boom.

In March 2023, Clancy became CEO of Twitch, after previous CEO and Justin.tv co-founder Emmett Shear announced he would step down after 16 years at the company. Both Shear and Clancy have been described as "more product-focused than creator-focused". On March 20, Clancy announced that Twitch would be laying off 400 employees, as part of Amazon-wide layoffs affecting 9,000 workers across the company.

On June 6, 2023, Twitch announced restrictions on third-party sponsor placements in streams, including restricting the size of sponsor logos, and prohibiting "burned-in" audio, video, or display advertising. The changes were met with criticism from major streamers such as Asmongold (who threatened to leave the service), MoistCr1tikal, and Zentreya due to their broad wording, concerns that it would impact streamers' existing relationships with advertisers, and their impact on charity and esports events that rely extensively on sponsorship. The service quickly retracted the new branded content policy and announced that it would be clarified, stating that it was intended to "clarify our existing ads policy that was intended to prohibit third party ad networks from selling burned in video and display ads on Twitch, which is consistent with other services", and that Twitch "[does] not intend to limit streamers' ability to enter into direct relationships with sponsors."

In August 2023, Twitch began to trial a "Discovery Feed" feature in its mobile apps, populated by "featured" clips from followed users. In October 2023, Twitch began to implement stories. At TwitchCon 2023, Twitch announced upcoming updates to its Guest Star feature (concurrently renamed "Stream Together") to allow for merged chat rooms, and that streamers under an affiliation or partnership agreement with the service (unless contractually required) would be allowed to simulcast their streams on competing platforms such as YouTube, as opposed to only mobile-centric video platforms.

On December 6, 2023, Twitch announced that it would exit the South Korea market effective February 27, 2024, citing the prohibitive costs of offering the service in the country. Due to demands from internet service providers that Twitch pay network access fees, Twitch restricted streams to 720p quality in September 2022, and blocked access to video-on-demand (VOD) content (including archived broadcasts and clips) in February 2023. Users in South Korea will no longer be allowed to monetize their streams, and will be offboarded from the affiliate and partnership programs. In February 2024, Twitch was additionally fined ₩435 million ($327,067) by the Korea Telecommunications Commission, deeming Twitch's degradation of service in the country to be unjustified and undermining the interests of users.

In January 2024, Twitch announced another mass layoff, affecting 500 employees or 35% of total staff, after previous layoffs in early 2023. The announcement came amid ongoing struggles and ensuing layoffs across the tech and digital media sectors.

In October 2024, Twitch's longtime head of music Cindy Charles died.

== Content ==
Twitch is designed to be a platform for content, including esports tournaments, personal streams of individual players, and gaming-related talk shows. A number of channels do live speedrunning. The Twitch homepage currently displays games based on viewership. As of June 2018, some of the most popular games streamed on Twitch are Fortnite, Grand Theft Auto V, League of Legends, Dota 2, PlayerUnknown's Battlegrounds, Hearthstone, Overwatch and Counter-Strike: Global Offensive with a combined total of over 356 million hours watched.

Twitch has also made expansions into non-gaming content; such as in July 2013, the site streamed a performance of 'Fester's Feast' from San Diego Comic-Con, and on July 30, 2014, electronic dance music act Steve Aoki broadcast a live performance from a nightclub in Ibiza. In January 2015, Twitch introduced an official category for music streams, such as radio shows and music production activities, and in March 2015, announced that it would become the new official live-streaming partner of the Ultra Music Festival, an electronic music festival in Miami.

On October 28, 2015, Twitch launched a second non-gaming category, "Creative", which is intended for streams showcasing the creation of artistic and creative works. To promote the launch, the service also streamed an eight-day marathon of Bob Ross' The Joy of Painting. In July 2016, Twitch launched "Social eating" as a beta; it was inspired by the Korean phenomenon of mukbang and Korean players having engaged in the practice as intermissions on their gaming streams.

In March 2017, Twitch added an "IRL" category, which is designed for content within Twitch guidelines that does not fall within any of the other established categories on the site (such as lifelogs). GeekWire reported that "while gameplay still makes up the vast majority of the content broadcast via Twitch, the 'Just Chatting' category—a catch-all term that encompasses anything from candid conversation to reality programming—took the top spot by a comfortable margin overall in December [2019]. While the category has been on the rise for the last couple of months, this was the first time that it's actually achieved No. 1 overall for a tracked period on the platform".

In 2020, Thrillist described Twitch as "talk radio for the extremely online". Michael Espinosa, for Business Insider in 2021, highlighted that "Twitch dominates the live content space, with 17 billion hours watched last year (per StreamElements), compared to YouTube Gaming Live's 10 billion (per the company). But the vast majority of gaming content is still consumed on-demand, where YouTube is the clear leader with over 100 billion hours watched last year".

=== As a teaching tool ===
Twitch is often used for video game tutorials; the nature of Twitch allows mass numbers of learners to interact with each other and the instructor in real time. Twitch is also used for software development learning, with communities of users streaming programming projects and talking through their work.

=== Charity ===
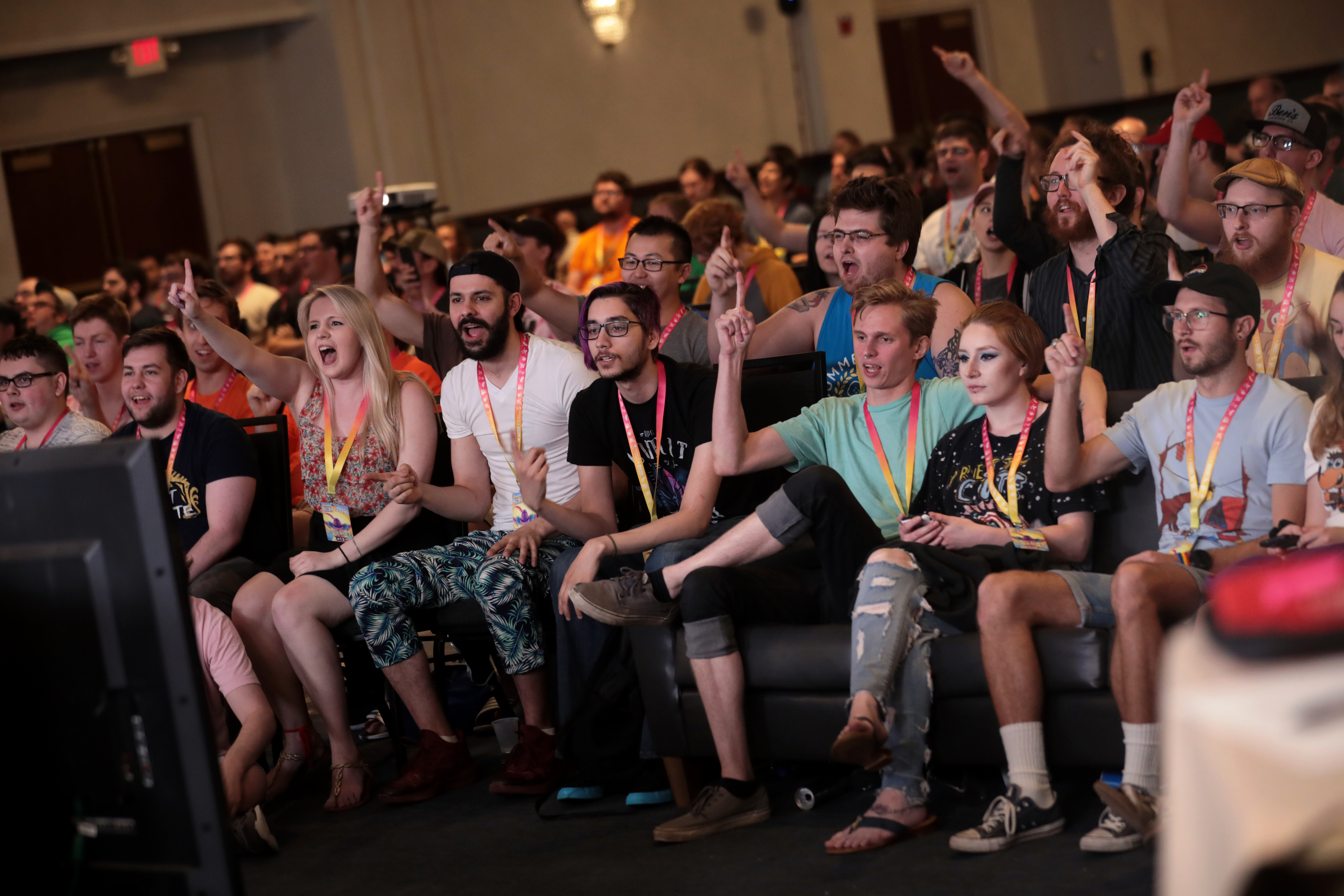
Games Done Quick is a bi-annual speedrunning event for charity hosted on Twitch.

Broadcasters on Twitch often host streams promoting and raising money towards charity. By 2013, the website has hosted events which, in total, raised over US$8 million in donations for charitable causes, such as Extra Life 2013. As of 2017, Twitch has raised over US$75 million in donations for charitable causes. The biggest charity event of Twitch is ZEvent, a French project created by Adrien Nougaret and Alexandre Dachary, with more than US$10 million raised for Action Contre la Faim in October 2021.

=== Esports ===
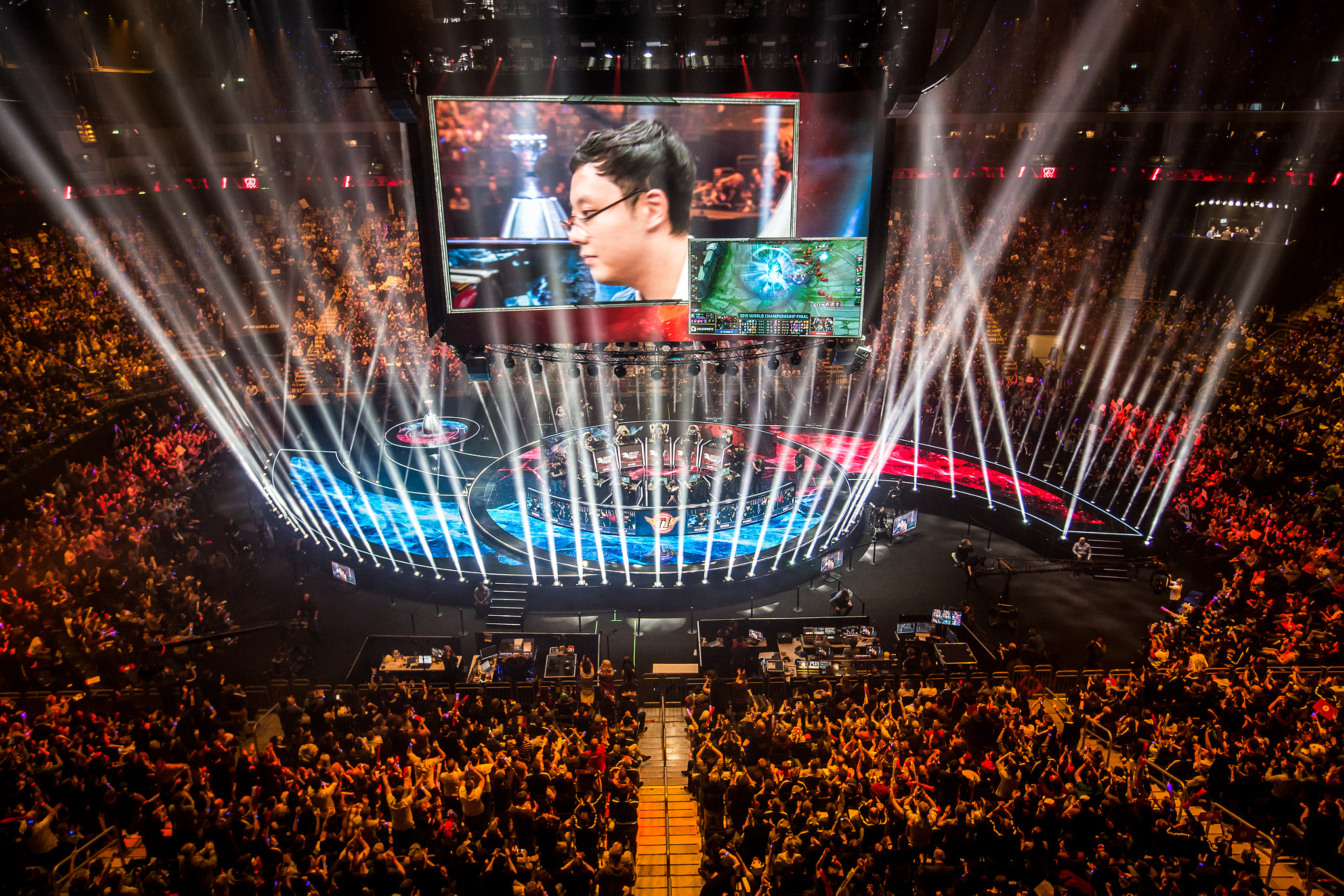
The League of Legends World Championship has been broadcast on Twitch annually since 2012.

ESL tournaments have aired on Justin.tv and later Twitch.tv since 2009. The platform has also been a longtime broadcaster of the Evolution Championship Series.

Twitch has been the official broadcaster of the League of Legends World Championship since 2012, as well as other League of Legends tournaments organized by Riot Games.

Dota 2's premier tournament The International has been livestreamed on Twitch since 2013.

The platform airs Rocket League tournaments organized by Psyonix since 2016. The ELeague also broadcasts events on Twitch since 2016.

Twitch and Blizzard Entertainment signed a two-year deal in June 2017 to make Twitch be the exclusive streaming broadcaster of select Blizzard esports championship events, with viewers under Twitch Prime earning special rewards in various Blizzard games. Twitch also reached a deal in 2018 to be the streaming partner of the Overwatch League, with the site also offering an "All-Access Pass" with exclusive content, emotes, and in-game items for Overwatch. Blizzard switched to rival platform YouTube in 2020.

Fortnite Battle Royale competitions have aired on Twitch since its launch in 2017, including the E3 2018 Fortnite Pro-Am and the 2019 Fortnite World Cup.

The NBA 2K League has been livestreamed on Twitch since its inception in 2018.

As the COVID-19 pandemic suspended motorsports competitions around the world, several series launched sim racing competitions with real-life professional drivers. Some series had official broadcasts on Twitch, such as Formula One and IMSA. Many drivers also had their personal live streams on Twitch, as was the case of several eNASCAR iRacing Pro Invitational Series and INDYCAR iRacing Challenge drivers.

=== Professional sports ===
In December 2017, the National Basketball Association (NBA) announced that it would stream NBA G League games on Twitch starting on December 15; the broadcasts also include interactive statistics overlays, as well as additional streams of the games with commentary by Twitch personalities.

In April 2018, it was announced that Twitch would carry eleven National Football League (NFL) Thursday Night Football games from 2018 to 2021 in simulcast with Fox, as part of the league's renewed streaming deal with Amazon Prime Video. During the 2017 season, these streams had been exclusive to Amazon Prime subscribers. As part of the broadcasts, Twitch would also offer alternate broadcasts, including broadcasts hosted by Twitch personalities, and NFL Next Live—an interactive broadcast hosted by Andrew Hawkins and Cari Champion. With Thursday Night Football moving exclusively to Amazon Prime Video for the 2022 NFL season, Twitch will continue to carry simulcasts of all games, while the site will also carry alternate broadcasts (such as one featuring Dude Perfect).

In January 2019, professional wrestling promotion Impact Wrestling announced that it would stream its weekly show Impact! on Twitch, in simulcast with the television airing on the US cable network Pursuit Channel (co-owned with the promotion's parent company Anthem Sports & Entertainment).

On September 5, 2019, the Premier Hockey Federation announced a three-year broadcast rights deal with Twitch, covering all games and league events. The deal also contained an agreement with the Premier Hockey Federation Players' Association for revenue sharing with players, and marked the first time that the NWHL had ever received a rights fee. The National Women's Soccer League announced a three-year deal in March 2020 for Twitch to stream 24 matches per season in the United States and Canada, collaborate on original content, and serve as the rightsholder for all matches outside of the United States and Canada.

On June 20, 2020, as an extension of Prime Video's local rights to the league, a plan to air all of the remaining matches of the 2019–20 season (for the resumption of play due to the COVID-19 pandemic and matches being played behind closed doors), and a plan for some of these matches to be carried free-to-air, it was announced that Twitch would stream a package of four Premier League soccer matches within the United Kingdom.

On July 16, 2020, US radio broadcaster Entercom announced a partnership to stream video simulcasts of programs from some of their major-market sports talk stations on Twitch channels. On July 22, 2020, Twitch officially launched a Sports category, primarily playing host to content streamed by sports leagues and teams on the platform.

The 2021 Copa América association football tournament aired in Spain on Twitch, under a partnership with Gerard Piqué's media company Kosmos and streamer Ibai Llanos.

=== Emotes ===
Twitch features a large number of emotes. There are emotes free for all users, emotes for Turbo users, emotes for Twitch Prime users, and emotes for users who are subscribed to Twitch partners or affiliates. As of May 2024, the most used emote is "x0pashL" with 8.85 billion uses, and the most used global emote is "TriHard" with 4.39 billion uses. Twitch partnered broadcasters unlock more "emote slots" as they gain more subscribers up to a maximum of 50 emotes per channel.

On January 6, 2021, Twitch announced that it had removed the PogChamp emote, the third most-used emote on the platform in 2018, typically used to express excitement, joy or shock. The decision was made in response to comments from the streamer Ryan "Gootecks" Gutierrez, the face of the emote, supporting civil unrest during the 2021 storming of the United States Capitol for the death of a protestor. Twitch said it would work with the community for a suitable replacement for the emoticon. Twitch later announced that there would be a new PogChamp emote every 24 hours. On February 12, Twitch viewers elected KomodoHype as the new permanent PogChamp emote.

== Creators and audience ==
=== Streamers ===
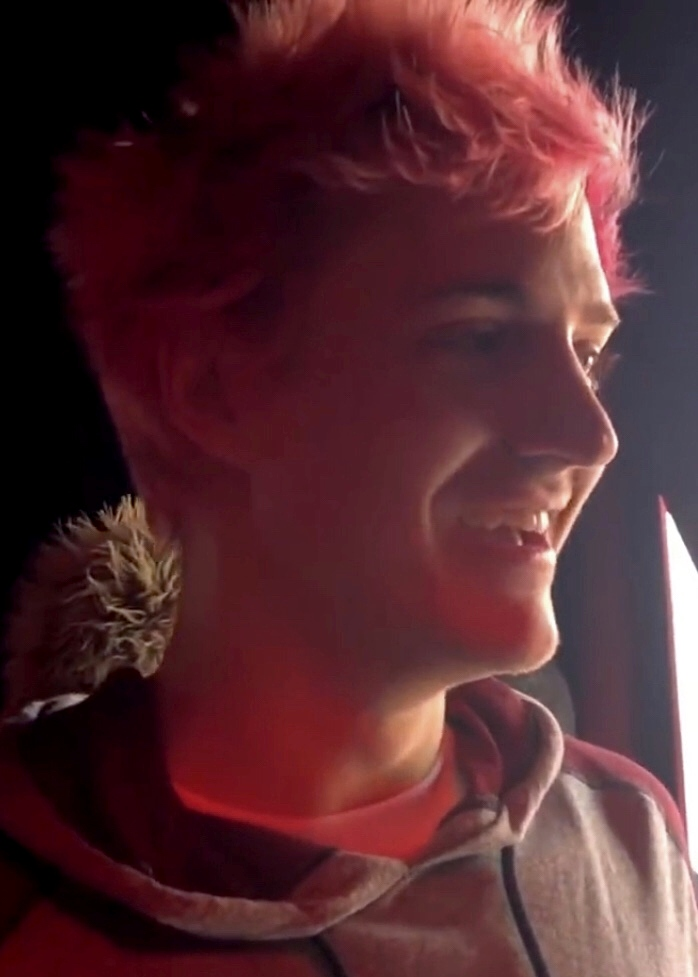
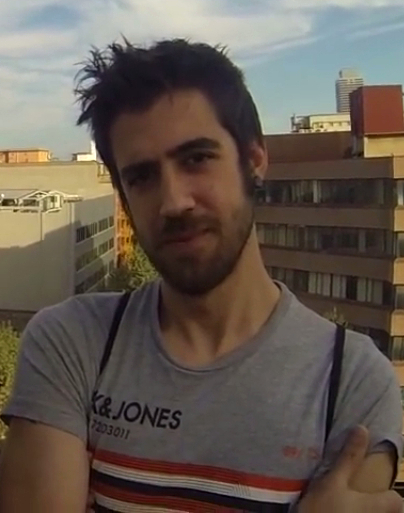
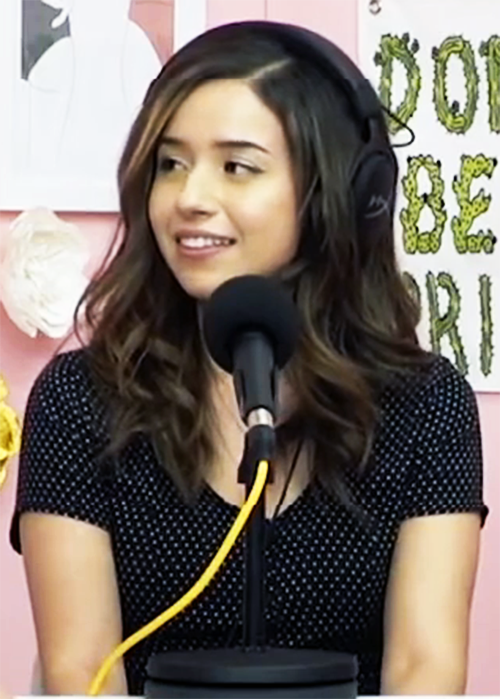
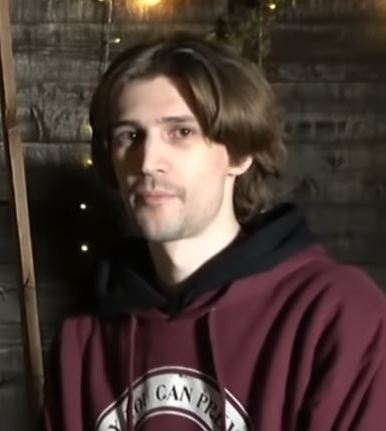
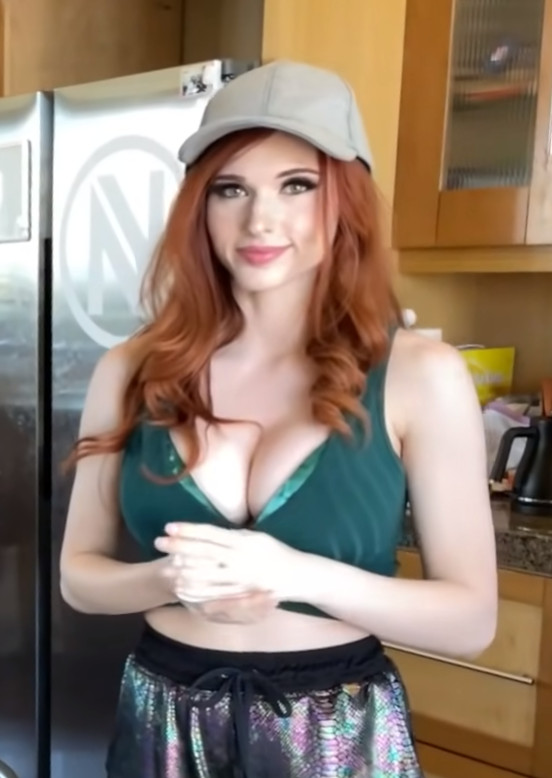
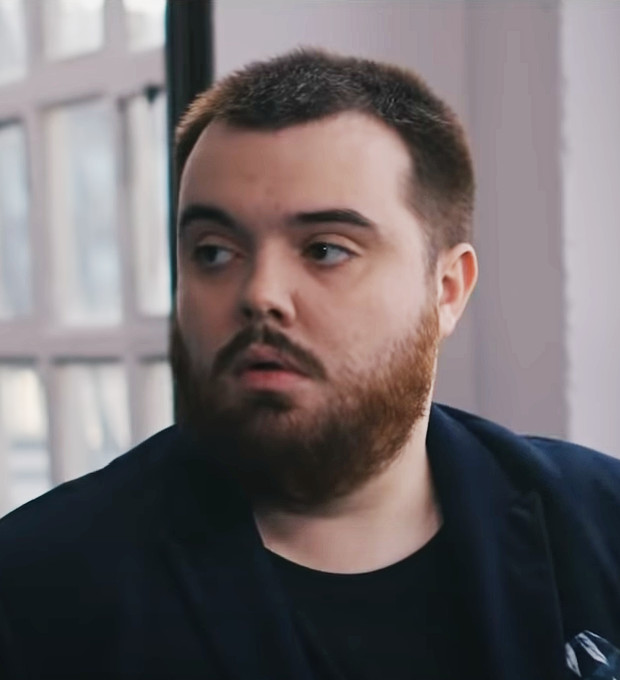
From top left to bottom right: Twitch streamers Ninja, AuronPlay, Pokimane, xQc, Amouranth and Ibai

Streamer Ninja had been among Twitch's top personalities, with over 14 million followers. In August 2019, however, Ninja announced that he would move exclusively to a Microsoft-owned competitor, Mixer. After Ninja left, the top three streamers in October 2019 based on follower count were Tfue (7.01 million followers), Shroud (6.45 million followers) and TSM Myth (5.1 million followers). Twitch began signing exclusivity deals with high-profile streamers in December 2019, starting with DrLupo, TimTheTatman, and Lirik, who had a combined 10.36 million followers at the time. Dr DisRespect signed a multi-year deal in March 2020. In May 2020, Twitch signed popular streamers Summit1g, dakotaz and JoshOG to multi-year exclusive deals. On June 26, 2020, Dr DisRespect was banned from Twitch for unexplained reasons and his channel was removed from the site. Following the discontinuation of Mixer in late-July 2020, both Ninja and Shroud (who had also defected to the service) re-signed exclusively with Twitch.

As of August 2022, there have been eight streamers to have reached over 100,000 concurrent subscribers. These streamers are Ninja, Shroud, Ranboo, Ludwig, Casimiro, Ironmouse, Gaules and Ibai. In April 2021, Business Insider reported that "over the past 31 days, Ahgren has streamed non-stop in an attempt to break the record of 269,154 subscribers held by gaming personality Tyler 'Ninja' Blevins. By the end of the month-long stream, Ahgren had over 282,000 subscribers on his channel. [...] At one point during his sleep cycle, his channel had the most concurrent viewers of any on the platform". In analysis of the October 2021 data leak, multiple news outlets reported that the three top-earning Twitch content creators are Critical Role ($9,626,712), xQc ($8,454,427), and Summit1g ($5,847,541). Sisi Jiang, for Kotaku, reported that "excluding streams that are run by multiple people (such as Critical Role), there are no women in the top third of top-earning Twitch content creators"; in total, there are only three women in the top 100 and only one is a woman of color. Jiang highlighted that these streamers are "Valorant streamer Pokimane at 39th place, cosplayer Amouranth at 48th, and music streamer Sintica at 71st" and commented that "in spite of the complaints about the 'hot tub meta,' 'titty streamers,' and how some male streamers perceive that female streamers are stealing views from men, the numbers show that only a small percentage of women are among the ranks of Twitch's highest-earning content creators".

In August 2021, DrLupo left Twitch for an exclusivity deal with YouTube; TimTheTatman followed in September 2021, as did Ludwig Ahgren in November 2021. Nathan Grayson, for The Washington Post, commented that when streamers moved to Mixer in 2019, Twitch quickly locked down multiple streamers in exclusivity deals; however, streamers who moved to Mixer saw their audiences undergo "a marked downsizing. [...] It demonstrated that many viewers within Twitch's ecosystem, when deprived of their favorite big streamers, will just find other Twitch streamers to take their place. [...] Now Twitch is bargaining from a place of confidence. That allows it to reevaluate previous deals made when streamers had more leverage". Grayson reported that lower offers from Twitch coupled with Twitch's higher streaming hour requirement ("YouTube's contracts start at 100 hours of streaming time per month while Twitch's start at 200") has made YouTube's exclusivity deals "tantalizing" to some Twitch streamers. Grayson wrote that "Ryan Wyatt, head of YouTube Gaming, said that allowing streamers to have a better work–life balance is a big priority for him"; DrLupo cited work–life balance as part of his decision to leave Twitch.

=== Users ===
It was reported in the early 2010s that the typical Twitch viewer is male and aged between 18 and 34 years of age, although the site has also made attempts at pursuing other demographics, including women. By 2015, Twitch had more than 100 million viewers per month. In 2017, Twitch remained the leading live-streaming video service for video games in the US. GeekWire reported that "while Twitch's overall share of the streaming market has been steadily diminishing over the course of the year, from 67.1 percent in December 2018 to 61 percent at the end of the 2019, the steady growth of the overall market means that the overall amount of content watched on the service has done nothing but increase". The journal article World of Streaming. Motivation and Gratification on Twitch reported the results of a Twitch user survey in 2017. In ranking user motivations on the use of Twitch, users were motivated (in descending order) to watch Twitch: "to be entertained", "to follow gaming events", and to "have an alternative for television". Motivations classified as "socialization" and "information" ranked lower than motivations classified as "entertainment".

As of February 2020, it had 3 million broadcasters monthly and 15 million daily active users, with 1.4 million average concurrent users. Statista, a company specializing in market and consumer data, reported that "as of May 2020, users in their teens and twenties accounted for more than three-quarters of Twitch's active app user accounts in the United States. According to recent data users aged 20 to 29 years, accounted for 40.6 percent of the video streaming app's user base on the Android platform". They also reported that the "distribution of Twitch users in the United States as of 2nd quarter 2021" was 75% male and 25% female.

As of 2022, the countries with the most Twitch users were the United States (93 million), Brazil (16.9 million), Germany (16.8 million), France (15.4 million), the United Kingdom (13.4 million), Russia (10.5 million), Spain (10.5 million), Argentina (10 million), Mexico (9.2 million), and Italy (8.3 million users). The United States accounts for roughly 36% of all Twitch users.

Twitch allows anyone to watch a live broadcast and does not require viewers to log in. Users also have the option to follow and subscribe (also known as subbing) to streamers. Following is a free option, similar to other platforms such as Instagram and Twitter, where the user will see their followed streamers on the front page of Twitch when signed in and can receive notifications of specific broadcasts. Subscribing is a way for users to financially support streamers in exchange for exclusive benefits determined by the individual streamer. Users who link their Twitch account to their Amazon Prime account gain access to Prime Gaming which includes one complimentary Twitch subscription per month that the user can assign to the streamer of their choice. The aforementioned 2017 academic survey stated that 31.5% of users "spent money on Twitch"; of those users, 22.6% "donated to a streamer", 31.6% subscribed to a streamer and 45.8% "did both". The majority of these users stated the "main motivation is to support a streamer financially". Twitch's Terms of Service does not allow people under 13 years of age to use its services. Additionally, people who are at least 13 years old but below the age of majority in their jurisdiction (18 in most jurisdictions), may only use the services under the supervision or permission of a parent or other legal guardian who agrees to abide to the Terms of Service.

=== Partner and affiliate programs ===
In July 2011, Twitch launched its Partner Program, which reached over 11,000 members by August 2015.

Similar to the Partner Program of other video sites like YouTube, the Partner Program allows popular content producers to share in the advertisement revenue generated from their streams. Additionally, Twitch users can subscribe to partnered streamers' channels for US$4.99 a month, often granting the user access to unique emoticons, live chat privileges, and other various perks. Twitch retains US$2.49 of every US$4.99 channel subscription, with the remaining US$2.50 going directly to the partnered streamer. Although exceptions were made, Twitch previously required that prospective partners have an "average concurrent viewership of 500+", as well as a consistent streaming schedule of at least three days a week. However, since the launch of the 'Achievements' feature, there is a clearer "Path to Partnership" with trackable goals for concurrent viewership, duration and frequency of streams.

In April 2017, Twitch launched its "Affiliate Program" that allows smaller channels to generate revenue as well, also announcing that it would allow channels access to multi-priced subscription tiers. The participants of this program get some but not all of the benefits of the Twitch Partners. Streamers can make profit from cheering with Bits which are purchasable from Twitch directly. Affiliates are also able to access the Twitch Subscriptions feature, with all the same functionality that Partners have access to, with a maximum of five subscriber emotes. In September 2019, the service announced that Affiliates would now receive a share of ad revenue.

Additionally, in June 2023, Twitch introduced the Partner Plus Program. This program was designed to recognize Twitch partners who consistently bring a large audience and engagement to the platform. Streamers in this program receive a 70/30 revenue share on subscription revenue. To qualify for the program, creators had to maintain a sub count of at least 350 subscribers for three consecutive months. Once that is complete, qualifying members will be enrolled for the next 12 months. The program was officially launched on October 1, 2023. This enabled partners to earn more as they continue to grow their community. However, a number of streamers were not happy with the program. Streamers argued that it excluded certain creators because of the criteria and that creators would burn themselves out by trying to achieve 350 monthly subscribers.

In January 2024, Twitch made some changes to the program. The platform announced that it would be introducing a new tier to its revenue share program that would grant a 60/40 revenue split and has lower requirements. In addition, the program would also become open to affiliates, expanding access to smaller creators. The program is now known as the "Plus Program." When the program was first launched the year prior, Twitch would only pay out the 70/30 revenue split until streamers made $100,000. Along with expanding the Partner Plus Program and adding a new revenue level, Twitch also announced that it would be eliminating the $100,000 cap for the 70/30 revenue share for all streamers. This was part of Twitch's strategy to provide more earning opportunities for streamers. The program uses a points system to determine which revenue split a streamer qualifies for. Each monthly subscription counts towards the points total. However, some subscriptions have higher point values. One tier 1 subscription is one point, one tier 2 subscription is two points, and one tier 3 subscription equals six points. To qualify for the 60/40 revenue split, streamers must maintain 100 Plus Points for three consecutive months. For the 70/30 revenue split, streamers must maintain 300 Plus Points.

Advertising on the site has been handled by a number of partners. In 2011, Twitch had an exclusive deal with Future US. On April 17, 2012, Twitch announced a deal to give CBS Interactive the rights to exclusively sell advertising, promotions and sponsorships for the community. On June 5, 2013, Twitch announced the formation of the Twitch Media Group, a new in-house advertisement sales team which has taken over CBS Interactive's role of selling advertisements.

For users who do not have ad-free access to a channel or Twitch Turbo, pre-roll advertising, and mid-roll commercial breaks that are manually triggered by the streamer, are displayed on streams. In September 2020, Twitch announced that it would test automated mid-roll advertising on streams, which cannot be controlled by the streamer.

== Content moderation and restrictions ==
=== Copyrighted content ===
On August 6, 2014, Twitch announced that all on-demand videos on Twitch became subject to acoustic fingerprinting using software provided by content protection company Audible Magic; if copyrighted music (particularly, songs played by users from outside of the game they are playing) is detected, the 30-minute portion of the video which contains the music will be muted. Live broadcasts were not subject to these filters. A system was available for those who believed they were inappropriately affected and had rights to the music they used to challenge the filtering. Twitch offered a selection of royalty-free music for streamers to use, which was expanded upon later in January 2015. The audio filtering system, along with the lack of communication surrounding the changes in general, proved to be controversial among users. In a Reddit AMA, co-founder Emmett Shear admitted that his staff had "screwed up" and should have provided advance warning of the changes, and promised that Twitch had "absolutely no intention" of implementing audio filtering on live broadcasts.

In June 2020, Twitch received a large wave of DMCA takedown notices aimed at year-old VODs and "clips" (short segments of streams that can be captured by users) that contain copyrighted music from 2017 to 2019. Twitch complied with the takedowns and also issued a number of copyright strikes against viewers. Concerned streamers were notified that they should remove all VODs and clips if not certain they did not contain copyrighted material. This provoked major backlash, both at the loss of prior content but also based on viability concerns due to an inability to review or even rapidly delete content. There were also complaints based that strikes were being issued on viewer-created clips, even where the streamer-created content was deleted.

On September 15, 2020, Twitch signed a licensing agreement with the French performance society SACEM, allowing composers and publishers to collect royalties whenever their music is streamed in France. Twitch already had licensing deals with the American societies ASCAP, BMI, SESAC and Global Music Rights.

To address these issues and also build upon the growth of music-based content on Twitch, Twitch introduced an extension known as "Soundtrack" in September 2020, which plays rights-cleared music with curated genre-based playlists. It is contained within a separate audio track that is not recorded with VODs, and had agreements with 24 music distributors and independent record labels at launch. A group of US performance rights and music associations accused Twitch of designing Soundtrack in such a way as to avoid payment of mechanical and synchronization licenses—claims which Twitch has defended.

In September 2021, Twitch and the National Music Publishers' Association signed a creative partnership.

In September 2024, Twitch introduced a new program for DJs on the platform, allowing them access to a new stream category for DJ mixes where music from participating labels may be streamed without the risk of a DMCA takedown, with a share of revenue being used to pay royalties (for affiliates and partners, this is deducted from the channel's existing split). This program has limitations: features such as VODs and clips are disabled on any channel enrolled in the DJ program, even if streaming non-DJ content (with Twitch officially recommending the use of a separate account for non-DJ streams), and DJs are restricted to playing music from certain labels and publishers that have reached agreements with the service (potentially restricting the ability to play unofficial remixes).

=== Mature content ===
Twitch users are not allowed to stream any game that is rated "Adults Only" (AO) in the United States by the Entertainment Software Rating Board (ESRB), regardless of its rating in any other geographical region, and any game that contains "overtly sexual content" or "gratuitous violence", or content which violates the terms of use of third-party services.

Twitch has also explicitly banned specific games from streaming, regardless of rating; this includes games such as BMX XXX, eroge visual novel games (such as Dramatical Murder), HuniePop, Rinse and Repeat, Second Life, and Yandere Simulator. The banning of Yandere Simulator was criticized by YandereDev, the developer of the game. He believed that the game was being arbitrarily singled out with no explanation, as Twitch has not banned other games with sexual or violent content such as Mortal Kombat X, Grand Theft Auto, or The Witcher 3.

Twitch took temporary action in May 2019 after channels related to the video game Artifact began to be used for inappropriate content. Artifact, a major game by Valve, had lost most of its audience in just months from its release, and by late May 2019, several popular livestreamers commented that the total viewership for Artifact streams had dropped to near zero. In the days that followed, several streamers started to make streams purporting to be Artifact gameplay but was trolling or other off-topic content. Initially these new streams were playing with the viewers or were jokes, such as showing animal videos or League of Legends matches. After a few days, other Artifact channel streams appeared containing content that was against the terms of Twitch's use policy, including full copyrighted movies, pornography, Nazi propaganda, and at least one stream that showed the entirety of the shooter's video from the Christchurch mosque shootings. The titles of such streams were usually presented to imply they were showing other content while waiting in queue for Artifact matches as to appear legitimate. As word of these streams in the Artifact section grew, Twitch took action, deleting the account that streamed the Christchurch shooting. Twitch then took steps to temporarily ban new accounts from streaming until it can resolve the issue. By June 2019, Twitch started taking legal actions against one hundred "John Doe" streamers in a California court, accusing them of trademark infringement, breach of contract, fraud, and unlawful use of the service that was harming and scaring away users of the service.

In early 2021, some streams began to use their Twitch channel to broadcast themselves from hot tubs while wearing swimsuits. Twitch considered these streams to be "not advertiser friendly", banning some of the more predominant channels that had taken this route. In May 2021, Twitch clarified in a "Pools, Hot Tubs, and Beaches" post that it was not trying to discriminate against women or others through this action, but through content that it deemed to be "sexually suggestive". In June that year, Twitch also took similar action against users that performed yoga while at the same time made autonomous sensory meridian response (ASMR) sounds via their microphones, which Twitch also stated was approaching sexual content.

In December 2023, the platform introduced a new policy that relaxed prohibitions on certain adult content, given that said content would be appropriately labeled. This came amidst the popularity of supposedly "topless" videos on the platform. Popularized by streamer Morgpie, the genre saw creators push the previous boundaries of Twitch's guidelines by implying but not explicitly showing nudity. Twitch's new policy also allowed depictions of "fictionalized nudity". However, Twitch rescinded its policy very shortly after, following backlash from users and streamers. Twitch CEO Dan Clancy acknowledged that the new policy was a step too far, and that distinguishing between digital art and photography was challenging. As a result, Twitch will no longer permit depictions of real or fictional nudity, regardless of the medium. The company also removed content that violated the updated policy and issued channel enforcements. While some changes to Twitch's Sexual Content Policy remain in effect, such as allowing content that highlights certain body parts and specific dances without a label, games featuring nudity or sexual violence as a core focus are still prohibited.

=== Hate speech and harassment ===
In February 2018, Twitch updated its acceptable content policies to direct that any content that it deemed hateful be suspended from its platform.

In June 2020, a number of women stepped forward with accusations towards several streamers on Twitch and other services related to sexual misconduct and harassment claims. Twitch stated it would review all reported incidents and comply with law enforcement in any investigative efforts. However, several popular streamers on Twitch's service believed that the platform could do more to evaluate the accused individuals, prevent incidents, and protect others in the future, and used June 24, 2020, as a Twitch blackout day, not streaming any content through Twitch to show their support. By the evening of June 24, 2020, Twitch had placed several bans on the accounts of those accused after completing its investigation, and stated in a blog post it would be forwarding additional details to law enforcement.

Twitch temporarily suspended an account belonging to then US President Donald Trump's campaign on June 29, 2020. Twitch stated that "hateful conduct is not allowed" as the reason for the suspension.

Twitch announced a new policy towards harassment and hateful content in December 2020 that would take effect on January 22, 2021, aimed to better protect marginalized users of the service. While the new policy is more strict, Twitch said that this also includes a larger sliding scale of remedies or punishments to better deal with edge cases, such as temporarily blocking one's channel for a short time rather than a full ban. The new rules include a ban on imagery containing the Confederate Flag, and 'racist emotes', though the list of such emotes has not been clarified yet. The new policy included banning words that were considered sexual insults, such as "incel" and "virgin" when used for harassment. The banned words included "simp", which raised criticism by streamers and long-time viewers. While its slang origins have defined "simp" derogatorily as "a man who invests a lot of time and energy into women who don't want him", the term had become common on Twitch as an insult related to men being nice to women on the service or simply to refer to a person with loyalty to another. Twitch, in response, clarified that penalties for using these terms would only be enforced if they were being used in harassment of other users.

On December 4, 2020, Twitch removed the "blind playthrough" tag due to concerns of ableism that it may be offensive to those who are visually impaired. Suggestions for non-offensive and more neutral labels include "first playthrough", "undiscovered," and "no spoilers."

A popular feature of Twitch is the ability to "raid" another channel, where multiple users, coordinated from a different Twitch channel or another social media service, all join a target channel to provide support and encouragement. This is typically used to help boost the popularity of the target channel, particularly if the raid is organized by a popular streamer. Twitch had officially supported this type of activity since 2017 with the ability for a streamer to send all of their viewers to another channel as a raid. However, around mid-2021, new types of "hate raids" began to occur with increasing frequency on Twitch. In these cases, numerous users would flood a channel and its chat with messages of harassment and hate towards the streamer as a form of cyberbullying. Most of these users are typically from automated bots, which made it difficult for channel moderators to deal with the amount of messages. Despite warning Twitch about these hate raids, Twitch had shown little action towards stopping them, leading numerous streams to organize a "#ADayOffTwitch" on September 1, 2021, as a form of protest in anticipation that Twitch will find ways to take action against them. After acknowledging a problem with dealing with hate raids, Twitch launched a lawsuit in early September 2021 against two individuals it had determined to be responsible for managing several hate raids after permanently banning their accounts. At the end of September 2021, Twitch introduced tools for streamers to be able to limit who may participate in their chat as to prevent hate raids. These tools allow streamers to limit chat to those that have verified their phone number or email with Twitch, as well as to those that have followed their channel for a minimum amount of time.

In May 2022, following the mass shooting in Buffalo, the New York state attorney general's office announced an investigation into multiple online platforms, including Twitch, to determine their part in platforming or promoting hateful content. The investigation will also focus on the platforms' moderation efforts. A spokesperson for Twitch stated that the service would comply with the investigation.

In November 2024, Twitch banned the use of "Zionist" as a slur. Twitch specified that the rule was conditional, saying, "You're allowed to discuss the political movement of that name, but not attack or demean another individual or group of people on the basis of their background or religious belief." The Anti-Defamation League, non-governmental organization that was founded to combat antisemitism, took credit for the change. The move was condemned by pro-Palestinian activists, such as Omar Zahzah, in the Palestine Chronicle, said it would ultimately lead to the ban of Palestine from the platform.

=== Extremism ===
In April 2021, it was reported that Twitch was providing a financial lifeline to extremists such as QAnon adherents and far-right influencers. Another report in August and September 2021, by the Institute of Strategic Dialogue also identified Twitch as a platform where far right extremists run rampant. Clips from far-right extremists, such as 'Omegle Redpilling' become quite popular before they are removed from the platform and in some cases, are not removed at all according to ISD.

In 2024, it was reported that new Twitch account sign‑ups from Israeli IP addresses had been blocked for an extended period. In public posts that month, Twitch claimed it had temporarily disabled email‑verified sign‑ups in Israel after the October 7, 2023 attacks to prevent graphic content, and further stated the block was inadvertently left in place, calling this an "unacceptable miss." Twitch also asserted phone verification remained available, a point disputed by many users. The restriction was lifted in October 2024.

=== Gambling ===
On September 20, 2022, Twitch announced that beginning October 18, it would prohibit the streaming of slots, roulette and dice games on gambling websites not licensed in the US or "other jurisdictions that provide sufficient consumer protection". The policy change does not affect sports betting, fantasy sports, and poker. Gambling has been extremely popular on Twitch for years, being one of the most popular types of content on the platform, with many streamers being sponsored by online gambling services; however, it has also been controversial, with prominent streamers such as Mizkif and Pokimane speaking out against the negative effects of gambling streams. The announcement came shortly after a popular streamer admitted he spent $200,000 in donations on CS:GO skin gambling.

== Internet censorship ==
As of September 20, 2018, the Twitch website is blocked and the app is blocked from the Apple App Store in China.

In India, Twitch was reportedly blocked by Reliance-owned telecommunication company Jio as well as internet service providers JioFiber and Hathway in September 2020 as some users were illegally streaming Indian Premier League cricket matches on the platform. Later it was unblocked.

Slovakia's government reportedly blocked Twitch in June 2021 after a streamer in the country with around 35,000 followers was found streaming poker, which was in violation of local gambling laws.

On July 4, 2022, the Iranian government blocked access to Twitch for Iranian Internet users.

On February 23, 2024, Twitch was blocked in Turkey per a complaint by the country's lotteries commission. Service was restored in the country six days later on February 29.

== Platform support ==
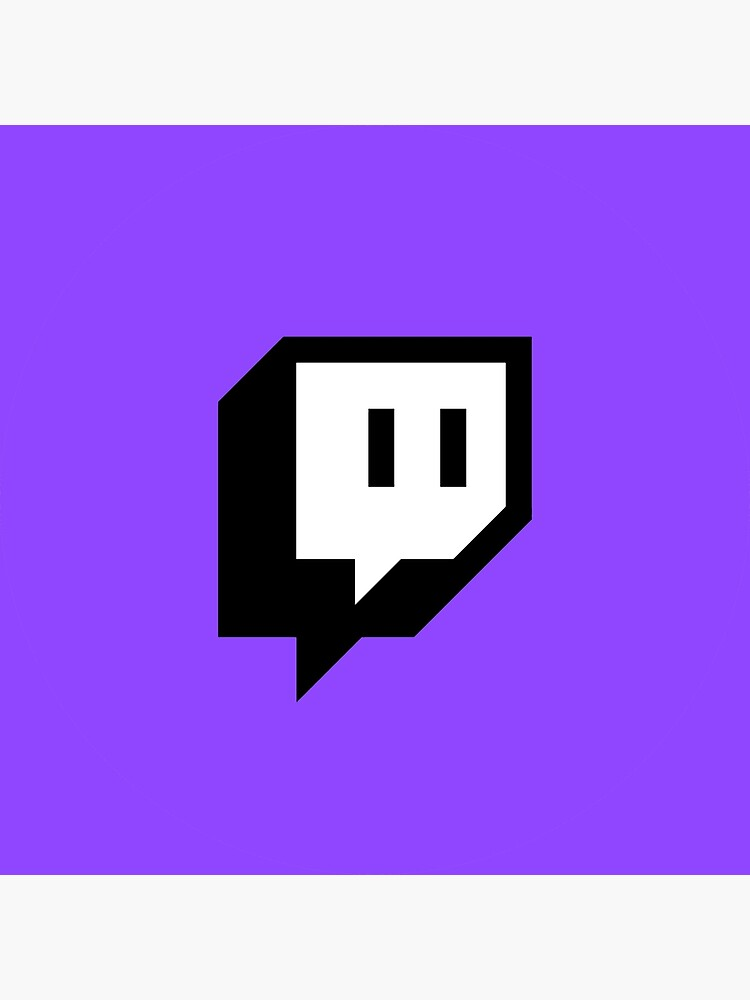
Twitch mobile app icon featuring the platform's signature purple color.

Twitch CEO Emmett Shear has stated a desire to support a wide variety of platforms, stating that it wanted to be on "every platform where people watch video". Users can watch Twitch streams via Twitch's website in a web browser and via dedicated streaming apps for mobile devices, digital media players and video game consoles. This includes:

- Twitch's mobile apps for Android, Fire OS, and iOS
- Twitch's web-based TV and game console apps for Fire TV, webOS (LG TVs), Samsung TVs (2020 and newer), Android TV, Apple TV, PlayStation 4, PlayStation 5, Xbox One, and Xbox Series X/S
  - The Twitch web-apps for Xbox and PlayStation consoles received an update that replaced the app with the "viewer-only" web-app for TVs, removing several features, including chatting.
- The Twitch Desktop App for Windows and macOS is no longer supported.
- Twitch's web-based TV and game console apps for PlayStation 3, Xbox 360, Nintendo Switch, and pre-2021 (Tizen-based) Samsung TVs are no longer supported

Users can broadcast to Twitch from the following platforms:

- Twitch's mobile apps for Android, Fire OS, and iOS
- Twitch Studio app for Windows and macOS
- Native integration on PlayStation 4, PlayStation 5, Xbox One, Xbox Series X/S, NVIDIA Shield TV Pro, and NVIDIA Shield tablets
  - Prior versions of Twitch's app for Xbox One and Series X/S had broadcasting functionality before being replaced by "viewer-only" wrapped web-apps for a single codebase across TVs on November 16, 2022. Twitch said it worked with Microsoft so those consoles could still broadcast to Twitch, though not through the Twitch app, but with native integration.
- Twitch released a software development kit for third-party developers integrate Twitch broadcasting into their software.
- In-app integration in third-party apps for desktop like OBS Studio, Streamlabs Desktop, Lightstream Studio, Melon, Split Broadcaster, Gamecaster, and NVIDIA GeForce Experience. Broadcasters can also use third-party apps for mobile like Omlet Arcade and the Streamlabs App
- In-game integration such as Eve Online, PlanetSide 2, some Call of Duty games, Minecraft and War Thunder
- In-app integrations in EA's Origin and Ubisoft's Uplay are no longer supported.

=== Twitch Desktop App and CurseForge ===
After acquiring Curse LLC, Twitch Interactive rebranded the Curse app as the Twitch Desktop App in March 2017. It kept features for mod installation and management for supported games via CurseForge; kept Curse Voice features such as screen sharing, text chat, voice chat, video chat and community server creation; added a dedicated browser for the Twitch website; added Twitch's friends system; and added activity sharing. This update also redesigned the application. The software also served as the client for the former Twitch Game Store. The Curse mobile app was subsequently rebranded as Twitch Messenger which was later shut down. Twitch removed the app's servers, group messaging, voice chat and video chat functionality in February 2019.

On June 22, 2020, Twitch Interactive sold CurseForge to Overwolf for an undisclosed sum. On December 2, 2020, mod management functionality was removed from the Twitch Desktop App. The mod management functionality previously found in the Twitch app can since be found in Overwolf's CurseForge app.

On March 30, 2022, Twitch announced that it would officially end support for the Twitch Desktop App on April 30, 2022, opting users of the desktop app to use a web browser to interact with Twitch on desktop platforms.

=== Creator Dashboard ===
The Creator Dashboard on Twitch is a tool that helps streamers manage and optimize their channels. In 2019, the platform announced a new set of features to make streaming more accessible and interactive. This new Creator Dashboard introduced features such as Stream Manager, Quick Actions, Creator Updates, and Assistant. These features were introduced so that creators could set subscriber goals, analyze engagement trends, and simplify streaming tasks. The Stream Manager allows streamers to view various aspects of their livestream such as their live chat, recent followers and subscribers, and a playback of the stream to see what the viewers are seeing. The Quick Actions panel on the Creator Dashboard allows streamers to perform actions such as running ads, enabling followers-only or emote-only chat, and creating clips. The Creator Updates section is a dedicated space for streamers to learn about important product updates and feature changes. The Assistant section provides creators with resources to help them grow their channel and become an affiliate or partner.

== TwitchCon ==
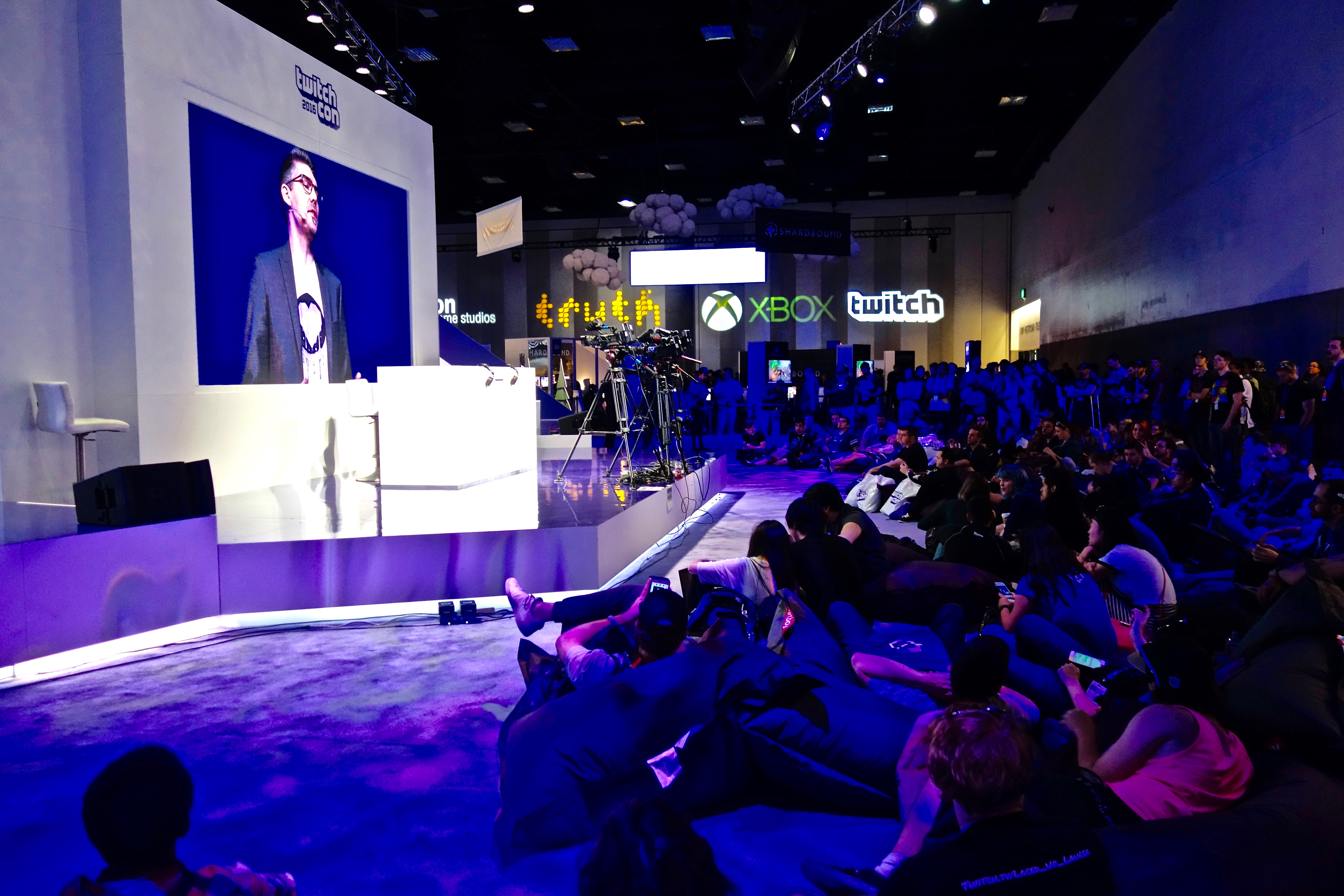
TwitchCon 2016

TwitchCon is a biannual fan convention devoted to Twitch and the culture of video game streaming. The inaugural event was held at the Moscone Center in San Francisco from September 25 to 26, 2015. Since its inception TwitchCon has been an annual event. The second TwitchCon was held in San Diego at the San Diego Convention Center from September 30 to October 2, 2016. The third annual TwitchCon was held in Long Beach at the Long Beach Convention and Entertainment Center from October 20 to 22, 2017. The fourth annual TwitchCon was held at the San Jose McEnery Convention Center in San Jose, California, from October 26 to 28, 2018. In 2019, TwitchCon expanded overseas and hosted its first ever European event in Berlin in April 2019, alongside a North American event later in November 2019 in San Diego. TwitchCon had planned to host an event in Amsterdam in May 2020, but this was cancelled due to the COVID-19 pandemic. Another TwitchCon event was planned in San Diego in September 2020, but was also cancelled due to COVID-19.

== See also ==
- List of social networking services
- Kick, a similar livestreaming service
