= PogChamp =

Emote originating from Twitch

The PogChamp emote on Twitch since 2021 (left)–which uses the same Komodo dragon image as the "KomodoHype" emote–and a cropped screenshot of Ryan Gutierrez used for the most popular variant of the original PogChamp emote (right).

PogChamp is an emote used on the streaming platform Twitch intended to express excitement, intrigue, joy or shock. The image originally depicted streamer Ryan "Gootecks" Gutierrez with a surprised or shocked expression, which originated from a YouTube video uploaded to Gutierrez's channel, Cross Counter TV, on November 26, 2010. The original emote was added to Twitch's pool of global emotes in 2012 and was later removed in January 2021, after Gutierrez expressed support for the January 6 United States Capitol attack. Twitch responded to calls to revive the emote by alternating between several unique designs every 24 hours, each using a similar expression, and eventually allowed viewers to vote on one of these faces to become the permanent replacement during what they called "The PogChampening". Users voted for an image of a Komodo dragon, which is also the basis for the KomodoHype emote.

Ryan Gutierrez was initially reluctant to allow Twitch to use his likeness for the original PogChamp emote, but soon made a deal to allow its use for between US$50,000 and US$100,000 and undisclosed additional concessions.

The emote, like others on Twitch, is displayed at a very small size of 56 by 56 pixels. PC Gamer described the PogChamp emote as "one of the most ubiquitous emotes in Twitch history [...] used to react to decisive moments", while Kotaku stated it "[indicated] surprise and hype". CNN describes the use of PogChamp as a gamer's expression for excitement, expanding the use of the PogChamp emote to the word PogChamp and its variants "Pog" and "Poggers" to describe "particularly awesome" moments. Emotes in general have been reported by CNN to be popularly used "ad nauseum [sic]" during moments while gamer activity is livestreamed. Given the long history of the use of the PogChamp emote and its variants, Twitch acknowledges the impact of PogChamp's role in shaping the culture of its streaming services.

== Etymology ==
The term "PogChamp" refers to a 2011 promotional video called "Pogs Championship" by Gutierrez, in which he wins a game of Pogs. Later on it has also been said to be an acronym for "play of (the) game," but this is a backronym.

== Usage statistics ==
PogChamp was the third-most-used emote on the platform. It was used a total of 813,916,297 times from January 9, 2016, until it was removed from Twitch on January 6, 2021.

== Removal ==
Some Twitch users in 2020 petitioned for Twitch to remove Ryan Gutierrez as the face of the PogChamp emote, following numerous claims of Gutierrez promoting far-right conspiracies, such as anti-vaccination conspiracies, and spreading misinformation and denial of COVID-19.

On January 6, 2021, Twitch announced that they would remove the original PogChamp emote following comments from Gutierrez on his Twitter page supporting further civil unrest in response to the death of a participant in the United States Capitol attack occurring that day. Gutierrez responded to the removal of the original PogChamp critically several weeks after the removal date, stating rhetorically at social media companies sifting through his posts to allow them to judge any negative intent about himself as a person. "They're looking for people that are trying to incite violence, but that's not what they found on my account. [...] So, why is it then, that Twitch seems to have decision making super powers? Because in less than three hours from when I uploaded the video, they made the decision to remove PogChamp as a global emote."

FrankerFaceZ, a popular web browser extension for Twitch featuring custom emotes, took the decision to ban all user-upload instances and variations of Gutierrez. Another similar extension named BTTV (Better Twitch TV) announced that their platform would continue hosting PogChamp-related emotes, allowing broadcasters to use their own discretion of whether they would like the emote in their chats.

The Verge describes the removal of PogChamp as part of Twitch's move towards becoming more mainstream by detaching themselves from hateful behavior in the gaming community.

=== Changing the face of the PogChamp emote ===
Twitch later announced that they would upload a new version of the PogChamp face under the same title every 24 hours, with each replacing the last. Instead of using Ryan Gutierrez's face, a different streamer was used as the face of the PogChamp emote each 24 hours, starting from January 8, 2021. Twitch claimed that changing the PogChamp emote every 24 hours would prevent exclusive association with a single individual; according to Kotaku, this would help make sure that "the Eye Of Sauron Of Harassing Dickheads at least has to glance around a lot instead of focusing its fury in one place". Although members of the Twitch community praised the diverse inclusion of various streamers, specifically those from minorities, some concern was raised by members of minority communities over Twitch doing too little to protect streamers from harassment.

The first two streamers featured as PogChamp emotes were Kenny "UnRooolie" O'Brien and Holly "UmiNoKaiju" Nguyen, who were Twitch Ambassadors in 2019 and 2018, respectively. Other faces included Gaules, DEERE, LittleSiha, Kahlief, Myth, and Granny, and the last streamer featured was SteveInSpawn. The first instance of the PogChamp emote not using a living person reused an existing Twitch emote, "KomodoHype", a depiction of a komodo dragon with a similar facial expression to the PogChamp emote. This resulted in fewer negative reactions. KomodoHype, which was previously less popular than PogChamp, has seen a significant increase in usage since the removal of the original emote.

On February 11, 2021, Twitch announced a poll that would take place the following day titled "The PogChampening", in which Twitch users would be able to vote for a new permanent PogChamp emote. There were two poll options: the face of American Twitch livestreamer UmiNoKaiju, and the existing KomodoHype emote. KomodoHype won with 81% of the votes, and PogChamp was permanently replaced with it. The original KomodoHype emote was kept, which left two different emotes with different names and duplicate images.

=== Reaction to the new system ===
The reception for the new changing system of the PogChamp emote has been mixed among streamers.

==== From streamers replacing Gutierrez ====
The temporary addition of Pokémon streamer Reversal as the face of PogChamp was described as a "positive experience" overall.

Omega "Critical Bard" Jones described his experience of being the face for PogChamp for a day as initially positive, though he later received comments after certain viewers who were unsatisfied that he "didn't look like PogChamp". He stated that the Twitch community "[doesn't] even care about PogChamp as a person" and rather prefers to keep "what they consider to be tradition", after a response to a viewer comment about white supremacy. What Jones saw as the Twitch community's reluctance to change and embrace diversity concerned him, especially given the lack of sufficient protection against "toxic elements" of the Twitch community applied by combinations of trolling, racism, and death threats.

Drag queen Deere experienced similar trolling incidents due to negative reception posted on Twitter and Reddit about her depiction of the PogChamp emote, although with simultaneous support for her too.

==== From the media ====
Andy Chalk of PC Gamer described Twitch's protection against harassment as insufficient, while Nick D'Orazio of InvenGlobal claimed that the regular PogChamp face changes may have "inadvertently [opened] up a whole new problem that sounds like a PR nightmare".
