= Migme =

Defunct digital media company

mig33
- Type: Public
- Industry: Internet
- Founded: 2005; 21 years ago (as mig33) in Australia
- Founders: Steven Goh and Mei Lin Ng
- Headquarters: Singapore
- Area served: Global
- Services: Chat, blog, games, stickers, virtual gifts etc.
- Number of employees: ▲30
- Parent: migme
- Migme
- Website type: Social entertainment platform, mobile digital, Social networking service, microblogging
- Available in: Multilingual (2 languages - English and Indonesian)
- Website: mig.me
- Registration: Required mig.me/download/android
- Users: 33+ million Monthly Active Users & 3000+ Artists
- Launched: December 2005
- Current status: Inactive
- Written in: JavaScript, PHP, C++ and Python

Migme is a Singapore based digital media company.

The company was formed in Perth, Australia in 2006 and commenced operations under the name mig33.

In 2014, it was rebranded as Migme. FIH Mobile, a handset unit of Taiwanese consumer electronics group Hon Hai Precision, took a 19.9% stake in the company in 2014. Originally developed as a social chatting and gaming application for feature phones, migme is a mobile entertainment platform that services Southeast Asia, South Asia, the Middle East and Africa. The company headquarters are in Singapore.

== History ==
mig33 was founded by Steven Goh and Mei Lin Ng in Perth, Australia in 2006. In 2007, it shifted operations to Silicon Valley where it focused on developing its engineering and technology capabilities and secured new venture capital. During this time, it acquired significant users in emerging markets of South Asia, Southeast Asia, the Middle East and Africa.

In 2012, it shifted its headquarters in Singapore to be closer to Indonesia, Malaysia, Philippines, Nepal, India and Bangladesh.

The firm develops applications for Android, WAP, BlackBerry and web platforms. It has also released applications on legacy J2ME-based devices. The product was developed using open-source systems, and features group chat, social gaming and blogging functions as well as virtual gifting. Its revamped microblogging service, launched in 2013, enables users to post up to 300 characters.

== Rebrand, investment and listing ==
On 10 June 2014 the company changed its name to migme Limited, and acquired alivenotdead.com, a Hong Kong–based artist community website co-founded by Patrick Lee, former chief executive of film review site rottentomatoes.com. Also in 2014, the firm completed a merger with Latin Gold Ltd., an Australian-listed mining company, which enabled migme to list on the Australian Stock Exchange by way of a reverse takeover, effective 11 August 2014. In 2014, FIH Mobile (a Foxconn-linked handset company) became the migme's largest shareholder through a $9.6 million investment, giving it a 19.9% stake in the company.

In October 2014, the company acquired LoveByte, a mobile app. LoveByte is headquartered in Singapore.

In January 2015, migme entered e-Commerce with the acquisition of Sold.sg. Sold is an online pay-to-bid auction house and e-commerce business. Sold operates in Singapore and Malaysia.

Migme currently operates offices in Singapore, Kuala Lumpur, Jakarta, Manila, and Taipei.

On 20 April 2017 Solaris Power Cells, Inc. announced that it had signed definitive agreements to acquire Migme. However this deal didn't help migme to increase sales, instead they incurred a $23.1 Million after tax loss. The end of the deal with Solaris, on August 10, 2017, was announced via a press brief with Reuters.
