= YouTube Gaming =

Video gaming application

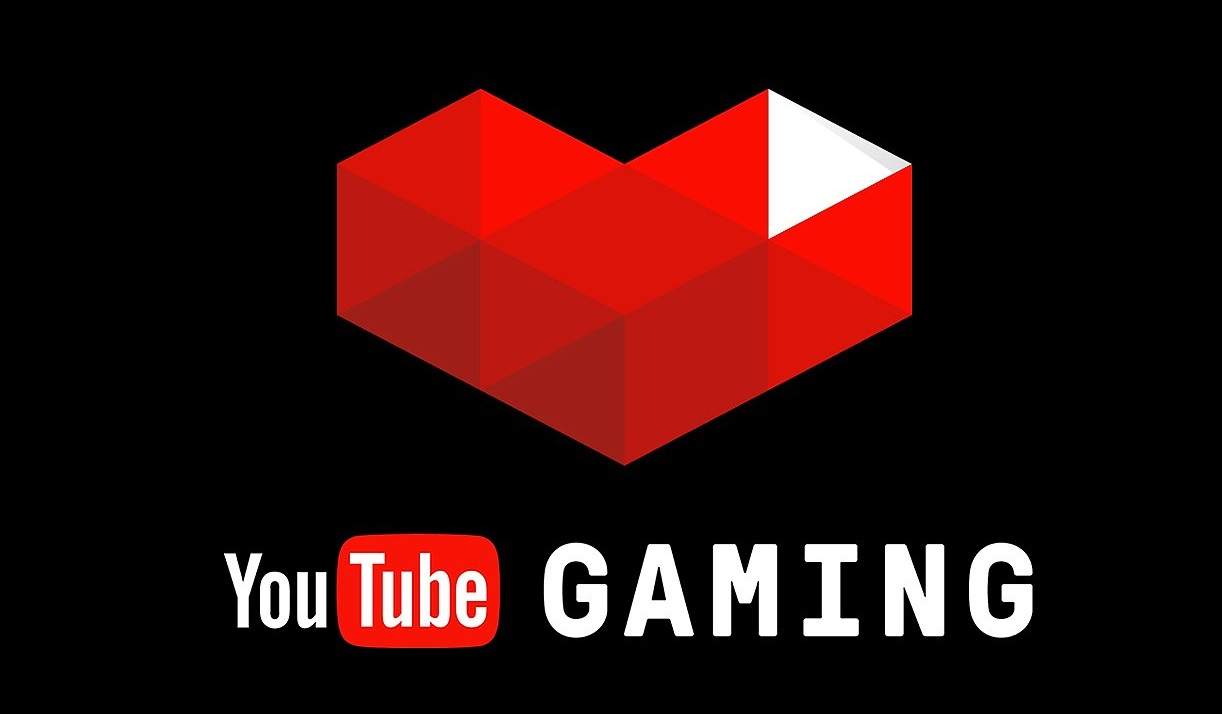
- Logo
- Website type: Video gaming live streaming
- Available in: Multilanguage
- Founded: August 26, 2015
- Dissolved: May 30, 2019
- Owner: YouTube
- Website: gaming.youtube.com

YouTube Gaming was a video gaming application for videos and live streaming, developed and launched by YouTube on August 26, 2015, and intended to compete with the Amazon.com-owned Twitch, Facebook Gaming, and Microsoft-owned Mixer.

== Overview ==
YouTube Gaming was turned into a gaming entertainment category to attract special interest in its online video service, where all game-related videos on YouTube were stored and had the ability to display live streams or uploaded videos and share it.

In September 2018, Google announced the shut down of the dedicated app on May 30, 2019, and merged it into the main application as a dedicated category.

== See also ==
- YouTube Music
- YouTube Premium
- YouTube Kids
- YouTube TV
