= Jen Fitzpatrick =

American engineer

- Born: 1976 (age 49–50)
- Education: Stanford University
- Occupation: Engineer
- Years active: 1999 - Present
- Employer: Google

Jennifer McGrath Fitzpatrick is an American engineer. One of the first female engineers at Google, she is currently the senior vice president for Google Core Systems & Experiences.

== Education ==
Fitzpatrick graduated from Stanford University in 1999. She earned a Bachelor of Science in symbolic systems, and a master's degree in Computer Science. She began using Google as a student, and joined the company's Summer Intern Program in 1999. She was one of four interns.

== Career ==
One of Google's first 30 employees, Fitzpatrick was hired by Google's founders following her internship, becoming one of Google's earliest female engineers. She reported to Marissa Mayer, who became her mentor. To improve gender diversity at Google, Fitzpatrick and Mayer insisted that at least one female executive interview every job candidate.

Fitzpatrick has led software development for products and teams including AdWords, Google News, Google Maps, Product Search, corporate engineering and the Google Search Appliance, and co-founded Google's user experience, focusing on improving visibility across multiple products. She holds a US design patent for the iconic graphical user interface of the Google search engine home page.

In 2014, she became the vice president for Geo, leading Google Maps and Local. Under her leadership, Google Maps expanded beyond navigation, integrating real-time traffic, business info, and Street View improvements. She aimed to make Maps more than just a driving tool, focusing on daily-use cases such as finding restaurants and businesses.

In 2020, she became the senior vice president for core systems & experiences. She also serves as a senior advisor for CapitalG.
