= Amouranth =

American social media personality (born 1993)

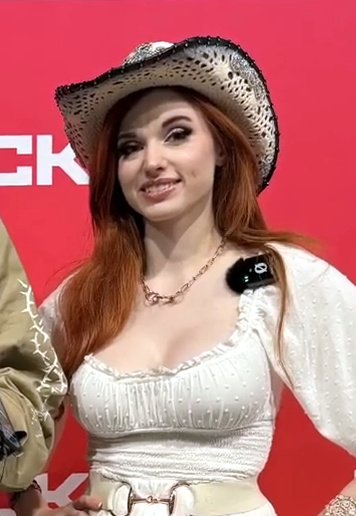
- Siragusa in 2024
- Born: 1993 or 1994 (age 32–33); Houston, Texas, U.S.
- Other name: Kaitlyn Siragusa
- Occupations: Twitch streamer; YouTuber; OnlyFans model

Kick information
- Channel: Amouranth
- Years active: 2023–present
- Followers: 267 thousand

Twitch information
- Channel: Amouranth
- Years active: 2016–present
- Followers: 6.1 million
- Last updated: January 19, 2026

Kaitlyn Michelle Siragusa (born 1993 or 1994), known professionally as Amouranth (/ˈæmərænθ/), is an American social media personality, online streamer, and adult content creator. She is also known for her ASMR-themed livestreams and adult entertainment on Twitch and Kick.

== Career ==
Siragusa was initially a cosplayer. In 2015, she was asked by streaming company Twitch to join as a content creator and livestream making costumes. She accepted, and by 2021 had become the most watched female streamer on Twitch, known for her dancing, ASMR, and adult hot tub streaming content. In May 2021, Siragusa reported that Twitch had cut her off from advertising revenue on the site without explanation. Twitch soon returned it but at a much reduced rate (around a tenth) compared to earlier.

On October 8, 2021, Siragusa was banned from Twitch, Instagram, and TikTok for the fifth time. She has invested in various businesses, including a gas station rented to Circle K (November 2021), an inflatable pool toy company (January 2022), and a personal assistant matchmaking service for content creators (July 2022).

In April 2022, she announced plans to quit OnlyFans by June to focus on Twitch. In September 2022, she hosted a health and wellness event on Chaturbate. In May 2023, she began streaming on Jerkmate and hosted the 2023 XBIZ Creator Awards.

On June 19, 2023, she signed with Kick, a livestreaming platform, and would stream some of her content there. In August 2023, she became the brand ambassador for FansRevenue and Jerkmate.

In June 2024, Siragusa invested in North American esports organization Wildcard Gaming, becoming a co-owner in the process.

== Personal life ==
In October 2022, Siragusa stated on a livestream that she had been married for several years, after her stream was allegedly interrupted by her husband, who could be heard verbally abusing her. Siragusa alleged that her husband had told her to hide their marriage for "commercial reasons", and that he had control over her finances, coerced her to stream more than she was willing to, and threatened to kill her dogs if she did not obey his demands. A few days following the incident, Siragusa stated she was seeking legal and emotional counsel, had regained access to her finances, and that her husband was out of her life and is seeking help.

In March 2023, Siragusa was diagnosed with ovarian failure, which she revealed during a video in June of the same year.

On March 2, 2025, Siragusa reported a home invasion at her residence in Houston, Texas. The Houston Police Department reported that three masked gunmen broke into Siragusa's residence as she was asleep, assaulted her, and demanded access to her cryptocurrency account. Siragusa's husband, who was also home at the time of the break-in, eventually opened fire on the assailants, causing them to flee.

== Awards and nominations ==
Ceremony	Year	Category	Result	Ref.
AVN Awards	2023	Favorite Creator Site Star	Won	
The Streamer Awards	2021	Best ASMR Streamer	Won	

== See also ==
- List of most-followed Twitch channels
