= Ryan Wyatt =

American gaming executive (born 1986)

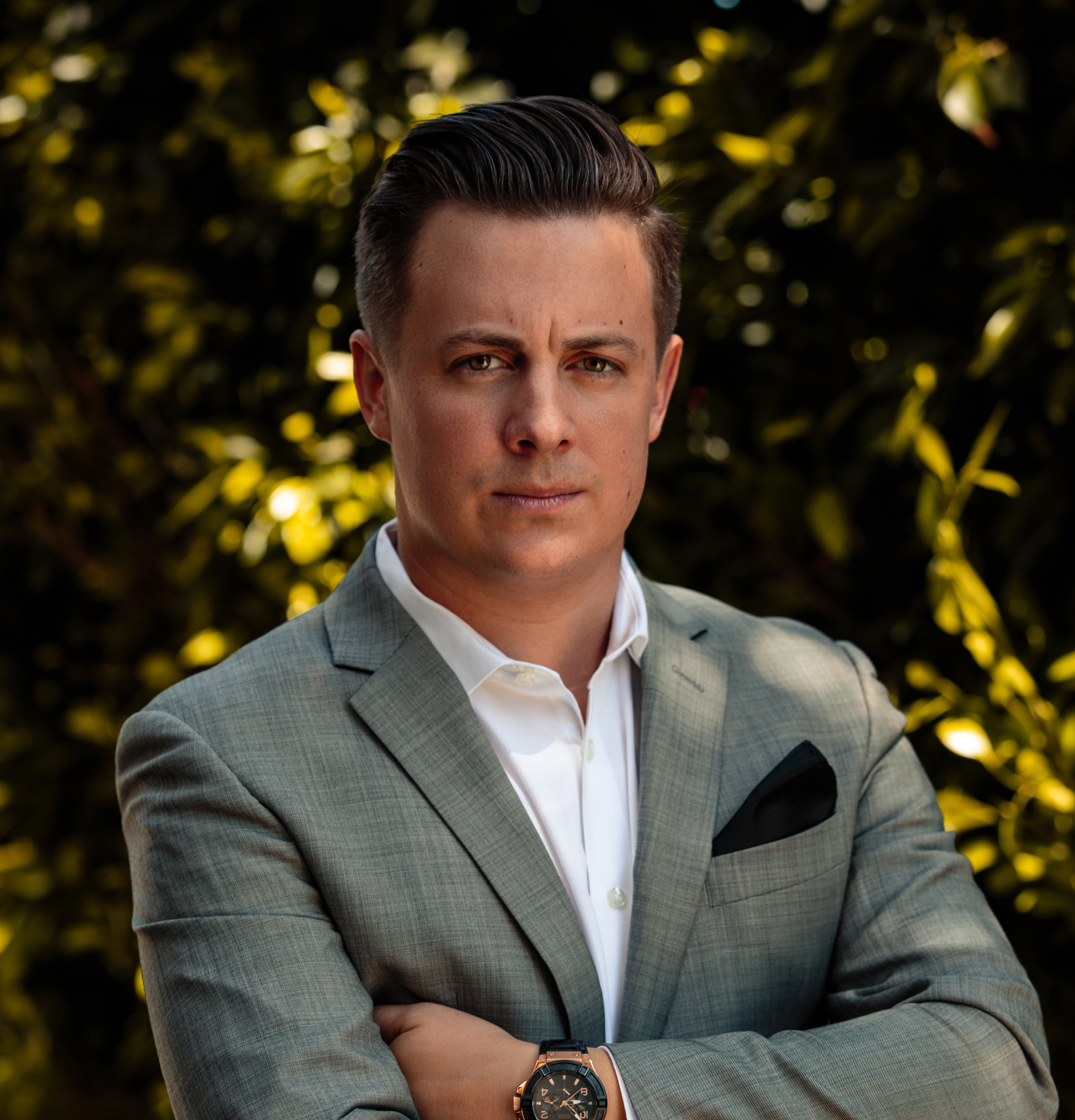
- Wyatt in 2019
- Born: October 7, 1986 (age 40); Canton, Ohio, U.S.
- Other name: Fwiz
- Education: Ohio State University
- Occupation: Chief Executive Officer
- Years active: 2008–2021
- Title: CEO of Polygon Studios

Ryan Wyatt (born October 7, 1986) is an American gaming executive. He is the former global head of gaming partnerships at Google and head of gaming at YouTube, where he also led their virtual and augmented reality business. Wyatt now is the CEO of $Cro CRONOS at Crypto.com

== Early life ==
As a child, he was diagnosed with Crohn's disease and received treatment at the Cleveland Clinic Children's Hospital.

== Career ==
Wyatt began his commentary career working for Major League Gaming (MLG) in 2008, casting at events such as the 2009 Call of Duty 4: Modern Warfare National Championship, as well as working as a referee and head of online tournaments for MLG's online eSports service GameBattles. In 2011, he joined Machinima as head of live and eSports, but returned to MLG in April 2014 as vice president of programming. As part of the deal, Wyatt's personal live video and YouTube channels were aired exclusively on MLG's streaming service MLG.tv, as well as their YouTube channel. In October 2014, Wyatt left MLG again to become the global head of gaming partnerships at Google and head of gaming at YouTube.

In May 2016, Wyatt collaborated with OpTic Gaming members Hector "H3CZ" Rodriguez, Matthew "Nadeshot" Haag, Seth "Scump" Abner, Will "BigTymeR" Johnson, Ashley "Midnite" Glassel and Ryan "OpTic J" Musselman in co-authoring the book OpTic Gaming: The Making of eSports Champions, which details the players' individual Call of Duty eSports careers and their contributions to the team's success. The book became a New York Times best-seller, and film and television rights were acquired by producers John Sacchi and Matt Groesch.

In May 2021, Wyatt backed Bright Star Studios in a $2 million investment deal for the company's massively multiplayer online sandbox game Ember Sword.

== Recognition ==
In January 2015, Wyatt was featured in the Games category for "Top Young Designers, Executives and Players" on the annual Forbes 30 Under 30 list.

In October 2018, Wyatt was recognized by Business Insider as one of the "Top Stars Leading Google's Entertainment Empire".

In January 2020, Wyatt was nominated for a Shorty Award in the Gaming category.

In September 2020, Wyatt was named to Fortune's 40 under 40 list.

In November 2020, Wyatt was named to The Hollywood Reporter's 35 Under 35 List.

== Personal life ==
On September 4, 2017, Wyatt announced his engagement to girlfriend Kayla Gish. The two married on August 18, 2018.

== Philanthropy ==
Wyatt is a board member of the Gamers Outreach Foundation, which provides recreation to children receiving treatment in hospitals with gaming technology, equipment and software. Wyatt cites his experience with Crohn's disease as one of his motivations for wanting to help others.

== Books ==
- Rodriguez, Hector; Haag, Matthew; Abner, Seth; Johnson, Will; Glassel, Ashley; Musselman, Ryan; Wyatt, Ryan (May 17, 2016). OpTic Gaming: The Making of eSports Champions. HarperCollins. ISBN 9780062449306.
