= Video game livestreaming =

Internet broadcasting of video game play

The live streaming of video games is an activity where people broadcast themselves playing games to a live audience online. The practice became popular in the mid-2010s on the US-based site Twitch, before growing to YouTube, Facebook, China-based sites Huya Live, DouYu, and Bilibili, and other services. By 2014, Twitch streams had more traffic than HBO's online streaming service, HBO Go. Professional streamers often combine high-level play and entertaining commentary, and earn income from sponsors, subscriptions, ad revenue, and donations.

Both AAA and independent game developers have increasingly benefited from the visibility provided by live streaming. Research on the video game industry suggests that live streaming can influence consumer choice and provide greater visibility and longevity for independent, niche, and older games. Twitch and other live-streaming platforms have therefore become an important part of the video game ecosystem, connecting developers, players, influencers, and audiences. Live streaming has also contributed to the growth and accessibility of esports, while providing new opportunities for audience engagement and interaction.

Through live streaming, viewers can watch experienced or entertaining video game players while immersing themselves in a virtual audience of like-minded people. Many viewers cannot experience these video games due to time and financial constraints. Video game live streaming can be a remedy to this dilemma, allowing the audience to consume the act of the streamer's consumption. Live streamers are seen as community organizers of a video game due to their ability to play said game or the entertainment they've created around it.

Twitch is currently the most popular video game live-streaming service for both streamers and viewers. The website averaged 35 million daily users in 2022 and 7 million distinctive streamers go live every month. Twitch has a global reach as well, hosting broadcasts in up to 35 different languages.

== Overview ==
=== History ===
The popularity of livestreaming video games began with WSBN, a shoutcasting station, video streaming a competitive Starsiege Tribes match via Windows Media Encoder to approximately 50 people in 2001. Own3d, an early esport streaming website based in Austria, operated between 2009 and 2013. It later became popular in the mid-2010s on sites such as Twitch. By 2014, Twitch streams had more traffic than HBO Go and eventually hastened the closure of Justin.tv, which Twitch had originally spun out of.

In 2015, YouTube launched YouTube Gaming, a video gaming-oriented sub-site and app that intended to compete with Twitch. Other notable video-game oriented streaming websites include Microsoft's Mixer, which shut down in July 2020, Smashcast.tv, which was formed after the merging of Azubu and Hitbox.tv, the South Korea-based afreecaTV, and many China based sites like Huya Live, DouYu and Bilibili.

In August 2020, China based video sharing website and live streaming service Bilibili paid Riot Games $113 million for the exclusive rights to broadcast League of Legends World Championship, Mid-Season Invitational and League of Legends All Star for three years in China. It was the biggest deal in the video game live streaming market, and made China's video game live streaming market bigger than Twitch, YouTube Gaming, and Facebook Gaming combined, according to journalist Rod Breslau.

=== Impact on the video game industry ===
Live streaming has brought attention to previously obscure video games such as Rocket League, Fall Guys, and Among Us. Rocket League, a vehicular soccer game developed by Psyonix, sold over 5 million copies after becoming one of the top 5 most-watched games on Twitch when it released in July 2015. The game eventually accumulated over 12 million players and earned itself a Twitch Rocket League Championship Series. In September 2020, Rocket League abandoned its traditional pricing scheme and became free-to-play.

This form of live streaming has become a popular form of advertising for video game developers, surpassing traditional mediums such as online magazines and traditional demos. Potential consumers can experience newly released video games without having to purchase them, which helps them understand which titles they would like to purchase. In fact, recent research suggests that live streams bring additional players into broadcast games and even increase online sales of these games.

Video game live streaming has increased the popularity of many free-to-play games like Fortnite, Call of Duty: Warzone, and Valorant. Free-to-play games cost no money to buy and play but offer purchasable items in-game in order to turn a profit. Items can range from clothes, weapon accessories, emotes, and more. Due to its popularity among live streamers and easy accessibility for viewers to play, free-to-play games blew up in popularity in the video game community.

Video game livestreaming has also increasingly become a significant method of promoting video games. Research indicates that livestreaming can effectively stimulate both gaming and spending among viewers. A study has shown that watching esports events provides viewers with a sense of escapism, social interaction, and enjoyment, which can lead to increased gaming activity and higher expenditure on in-game purchases.

Another reason for the increased popularity of free-to-play games was the frequent updates and patches provided for the player base. Major issues users found in games were getting fixed much more frequently than in AAA games. Due to the popularity of these games, live-streaming platforms have become places of discussion and suggestions on how to improve these games.

Older titles, such as Super Mario 64 and The Legend of Zelda: Ocarina of Time, have seen renewed popularity due to speedruns, or rapid completions, facilitated by live streaming. This has been a key component in diversifying livestreaming audiences.

=== Impact on esports ===
With the ability for anyone to watch from home on their devices, esports viewership reached 213 million in 2016 and continues to grow every year. Popular eSports titles include Call of Duty, Counter Strike: Global Offensive, Dota 2, Fortnite, League of Legends, and Overwatch. One of the biggest prize pools in esports was for the Dota 2 tournament, The International, which totaled a pool of US$25 million in 2017.

Smaller video game communities, such as the Super Smash Bros Melee community, have benefited from the visibility they have gained from video game live streaming. In 2013, several members of the Super Smash Bros Melee community live streamed in order to raise money to become the eighth game featured at the prestigious tournament Evolution Championship Series and overturn a decision by Nintendo to ban the game from the event.

=== Streamer-viewer relationship ===
Livestreaming video games has become a phenomenon that offers a range of entertainment as well as engagement. Live chat (often shortened to just "chat") is at the heart of this culture, serving as a hub where viewers and streamers communicate. People are not only interested in the gameplay itself, but in the personalities and entertainment provided by the streamer, as well as the dynamic between the streamer and viewers through chat.

Live chat enables this interactivity through features like subscriber emotes (emotes that can only be used by viewers that pay a subscription to the streamer). These emotes are often designed specifically by (or commissioned by) each streamer and reflect their personality or unique characteristics, allowing fans to develop a sense of community surrounding the streamer. Many major streaming services provide some way for viewers to donate to the streamer, and some streamers set up these donations to be read by a text-to-speech program and many will respond to these messages.

=== Social activism ===
In December 2019, famous streamer, Dr. Lupo, hosted a 24-hour charity live stream to have all donations and earnings earned during the stream donated to St. Jude Children's Research Hospital. The stream managed to raise $2.3 million, with Twitch itself donating $1 million of the total.

In 2020, American politician Alexandria Ocasio-Cortez live streamed herself playing the popular game Among Us with other streamers who have large followings in an effort to encourage people to vote in the 2020 United States presidential election.

== Profession ==
Video game livestreaming is an emerging industry. The growth of the industry has allowed many Internet companies to rise, while also allowing many grassroots gamers to leap to become big anchors, which brings more employment opportunities for young people. Professional streamers often combine gameplay with highly knowledgeable or dexterous play and entertaining commentary. They can generate sufficient revenue from viewer subscriptions and donations, as well as platform advertisements and sponsorships from eSports organizations.

An October 2017 report from SuperData Research estimated that more people subscribed to video game streams and Let's Play videos on YouTube and Twitch than for all of HBO, Netflix, ESPN, and Hulu, combined.

=== Benefits ===
As a profession, video game live streaming allows people to play the games they love while supporting their livelihood. As they gain bigger followings by streaming consistently and marketing, streamers are able to take advantage of the tools within most streaming platforms, such as subscriptions, donations, or advertisements, to support themselves. On some live streaming platforms, such as Douyu and Huya Live, viewers can tip the streamers in the form of virtual gifting. Streamers can also become sponsored, or offer rewards in the form of competitions or games to the viewers in order to promote their channel and increase viewership and monetization.

Some competitions offer substantial cash prizes. For example, professional Fortnite player Bugha won $3 million at the Fortnite World Cup in July 2019. In addition, streamers can control their work schedule, and successful streaming can provide a source of income. Video game live streaming allows people to transform a hobby of playing video games into a source of income by streaming their gameplay, while also providing opportunities to reach a large audience and gain recognition.

=== Risks ===
Streamers run the risk of being victims of stalking, as is common with other public figures. For example, a teenage viewer showed up uninvited to a streamer's house and requested to stream with him after having saved up for a one-way transcontinental flight. Another risk to streamers is swatting, where someone makes a false report to police of serious criminal activity taking place at the streamer's residence, resulting in a raid by police, which is often captured live by the streaming service. Such activity can create serious risk to the streamer, and has even resulted in deaths.

In the 2017 Wichita swatting, police officers killed a man named Andrew Finch at his Kansas home. Finch was the unintended victim of the swatting after two Call of Duty players on the same team got into a heated argument about a US$1.50 bet. LAPD arrested 25-year-old serial-swatter Tyler Raj Barriss, known online as "SWAuTistic" and "GoredTutor36", in connection with the incident, who was later sentenced to 20 years in federal prison for the offense. In another instance, a streamer by the name Jamie Lynn Greenwood was swatted while playing Minecraft.

==== Stream sniping ====
Stream sniping is a common tactic to gain an advantage in a video game by watching the live stream of an enemy player while playing. Several video game developers have taken measures against stream sniping, and video games such as Rust and Fortnite now hide the names of popular streamers.

In November 2018, live streamer Ninja controversially threatened to report a player who he thought had killed him in Fortnite by stream sniping. While stream sniping happens somewhat rarely for most streamers due to the countermeasures set by the games, as well as tactics set up by the streamers themselves like covering up the in-game map or setting a delay for the stream, there are cases, like for the popular Twitch streamer Forsen, where stream sniping plays a part in a streamer's entertainment and therefore the streamer allows it.

=== Entry ===
Players involved in eSports can get into streaming by using their popularity or by using their honed skills and in-depth game knowledge during their livestream. People on YouTube or other social media platforms often become streamers as well to interact more with viewers. Other types of people that enter streaming include video game creators and people who write articles or blogs about video games.

To build an audience, experienced streamers recommend that newer streamers stream a popular game because it is more likely to interest viewers.

Popular titles in the mid-2010s include League of Legends, Dota 2, first-person shooters such as Counter Strike: Global Offensive, and card games such as Hearthstone. Viewers are more interested in players who play and entertain well, offering jokes, pop culture, and current event commentary instead of repetitive gameplay. Streamers also recommend keeping a schedule so viewers know when to watch, self-promoting on social media, and holding giveaway contests to increase followers.

=== Streaming equipment ===
Microphones are critical to live streaming because they allow streamers to vocally communicate with their audience. Webcams are also useful because they allow the audience to see streamers and recognize them. If using a webcam, many streamers have additional lighting to brighten up their faces when streaming to allow viewers to see them clearly. An Ethernet cable (as opposed to WiFi) is highly recommended for streamers because it minimizes stuttering while streaming. XLR or USB cardiod microphones are a popular choice among streamers and can be spotted in most streams.

Home video game consoles, such as the PlayStation 4, PlayStation 5, Xbox Series X and Xbox One, contain built-in streaming and optional camera integration for streamers to use. Streamers using computers use software such as Open Broadcaster Software or XSplit to upload a livestream to the Twitch servers. For streamers using laptops, many gaming laptops are coming with new graphics cards and better connectivity to help streamers to stream their gaming experiences.

== List of video game live streaming websites ==
=== Active ===
The following is a list of sites that primarily focuses on video game live streaming, including broadcasts of eSports competitions, in addition to other types of content.

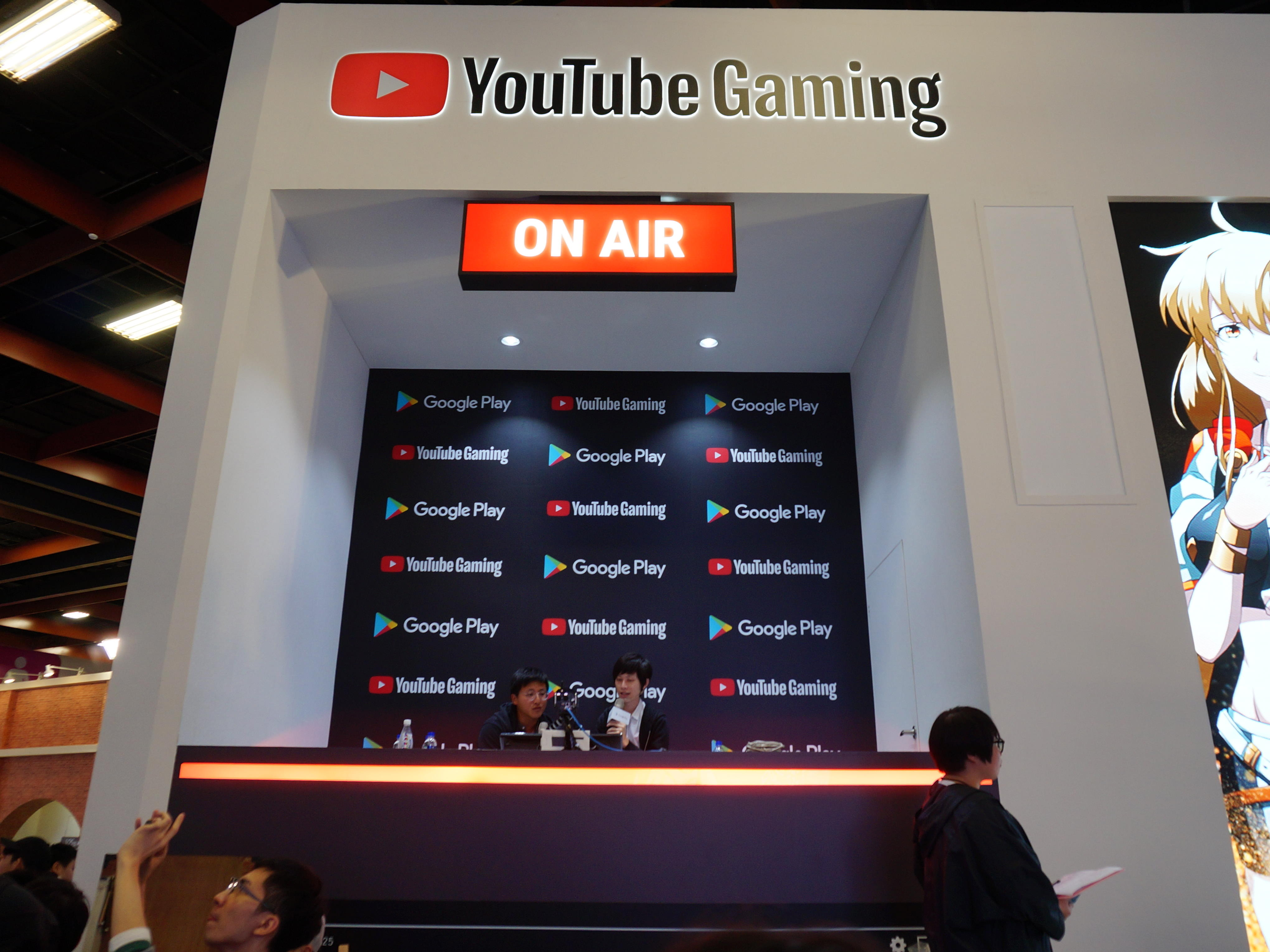
YouTube Gaming booth at Google event in 2019

| Website | Domain | Launch | Owner | Note |
|---|---|---|---|---|
| Twitch | twitch.tv | June 6, 2011 | Amazon | |
| YouTube | youtube.com/gaming | | Google | |
| Facebook | fb.gg | | Meta Platforms | |
| Steam Broadcast | steamcommunity.com | 2015 | Valve | |
| Kick | kick.com | December 1, 2022 | | |
| Huya Live | huya.com | November 24, 2014 | Tencent (50.1%), JOYY (43%) | |
| Nimo TV | nimo.tv | May 3, 2018 | Tencent (50.1%), JOYY (43%) | Huya Live 's global site |
| DouYu | douyu.com | 2014 | Tencent (37%) | |
| Bilibili | live.bilibili.com | | Tencent (Minority ownership) | |
| Kuaishou | live.kuaishou.com | | Tencent (Minority ownership) | |
| YY | yy.com | 2012 | JOYY | |
| SOOP | sooplive.com | May 11, 2005 | | Rebranded from AfreecaTV on October 15, 2024 |
| Loco | loco.gg | November 2017 | Anirudh Pandita, Ashwin Suresh | |
| Owncast | owncast.online | August 8, 2020 | | Owncast is part of the Fediverse and can be self-hosted |
| Mildom | mildom.com | August 2019 | | |

=== Defunct ===
| Website | Domain | Launch | Owner | Note |
|---|---|---|---|---|
| Mixer | mixer.com | January 5, 2016 | Microsoft | Mixer has shut down on July 22, 2020. (Microsoft currently partners with Facebook) |
| Smashcast | smashcast.tv | May, 2017 | | Defunct as of 2020 |
| Azubu | azubu.tv | 2012 | | Shut down and was succeeded by Smashcast |
| Hitbox | hitbox.tv | October 2013 | | Acquired by Azubu and then succeeded by Smashcast |
| Caffeine | caffeine.tv | January 31, 2018 | | Caffeine shut down on June 26, 2024. |
| DLive | dlive.tv | September 2018 | Rainberry, Inc. | DLive was shut down on April 27, 2026. |
| Trovo Live | trovo.live | March, 2020 | Tencent | Trovo was shut down on June 30, 2026. |

== Legal issues ==
Live streaming of video games has many of the same legal issues that Let's Play videos may have. First and foremost, such videos can be considered a copyright violation, though is argued to be protected by fair use defenses. Streamers with larger audiences can also promote the game before its release by receiving a copy of the game from the developer to play on their platform, which runs the risk of violating ethical business practices if they stand to make a substantial amount of income from this promotion.

Nintendo has generally taken a strong stance compared to other publishers for allowing their games to be streamed or recorded. Initially, they have used YouTube's Content ID system to register their games such that they can generate ad revenue from streaming videos and Let's Play videos. By about 2014, Nintendo crafted its Nintendo Creators Program, which would allow players providing live streams and Let's Plays of Nintendo games that sign onto the program to receive some monetization of these videos through YouTube. However, in September 2017, Nintendo changed the program specifically preventing affiliates from streaming video of Nintendo games, monetized or not, though non-affiliated accounts, and Let's Plays with commentary, remain unaffected. However, on November 28, 2018, Nintendo announced that the program was shutting down.

The playing of copyrighted music without proper permission may cause archived streams to be removed or muted. Streamers can also be suspended, due to complaints under laws such as the U.S. Online Copyright Infringement Liability Limitation Act, or automated content matching. More than 10 popular Twitch streamers, including Félix "xQc" Lengyel and Zachary "Sneaky" Scuderi, were banned for 24 hours for allegedly playing a song by Juice WRLD in June 2018. Some of the bans were lifted, with the artist's record label Interscope claiming that the ban was accidental. Even backlash from small streamers is on the rise.

English live streamer PhatUnicorn420 uses music from his real life brother, music producer SampleTheChef. Even after rejecting and disputing over 200 video mutes to his channel, Twitch are still unable to identify Phat's claims and to stop them reoccurring. Twitch sent a letter to users in October 2020 stating that it would remove videos or channels that had copyrighted music on them, and that it could not stop streamers from facing punishments due to Digital Millennium Copyright Act (DMCA) violations.

== See also ==
- Gamecaster
- Online streamer
- DouYu
- Huya Live
