= Justin Kan =

American internet entrepreneur and investor

Justin Kan 簡彥豪
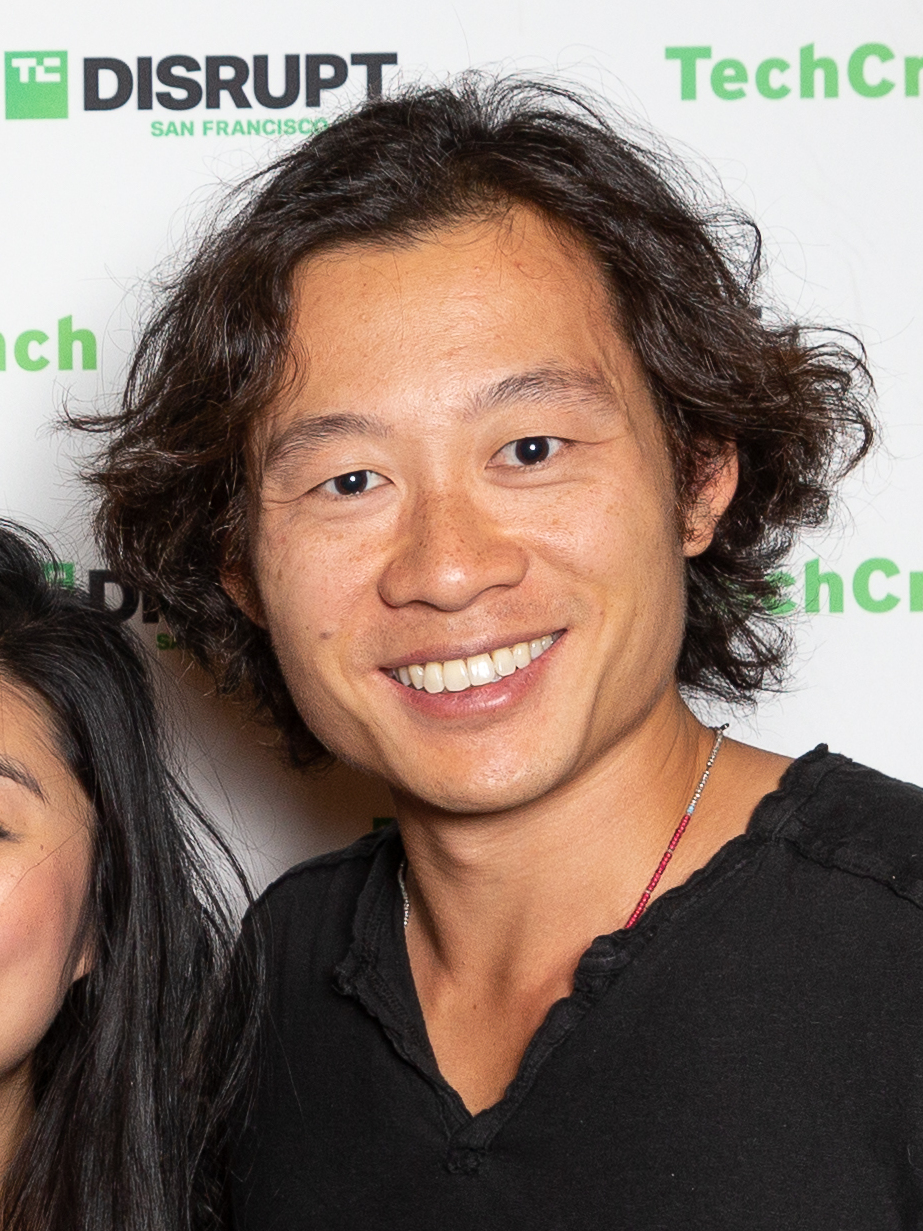
- Kan in 2019
- Born: July 16, 1983 (age 43); Seattle, Washington, US
- Education: Yale University
- Occupation: Investor
- Known for: Co-founding Twitch

YouTube information
- Channel: Justin Kan
- Subscribers: 167 thousand

Chinese name
- Traditional Chinese: 簡彥豪
- Simplified Chinese: 简彦豪
Transcriptions
Standard Mandarin
- Hanyu Pinyin: Jiǎn Yànháo
Yue: Cantonese
- Jyutping: Gaan2 Jin6hou4
- Last updated: May 11, 2026
- Website: justinkan.com

Justin Kan (born July 16, 1983) is an American internet entrepreneur and investor. He is the co-founder of live video platforms Justin.tv and Twitch, as well as the mobile social video application Socialcam. He was also the co-founder and former CEO of law-tech company Atrium before it was shut down in March 2020. In 2021, he launched NFT marketplace Fractal, which was renamed to Stash in 2024.

He was a partner at Silicon Valley incubator Y Combinator. He gained widespread attention for his "lifecasting" experiment on Justin.tv, where he attempted to broadcast his entire life. Kan also started a Reddit-style electronic music discovery platform, The Drop.

== Career ==
=== Justin.tv ===
In 2007, Justin Kan and partners Emmett Shear, Michael Seibel and Kyle Vogt started Justin.tv, a 24–7 live video feed of Kan's life, broadcast via a webcam attached to his head. Kan was 23 years old at the time.

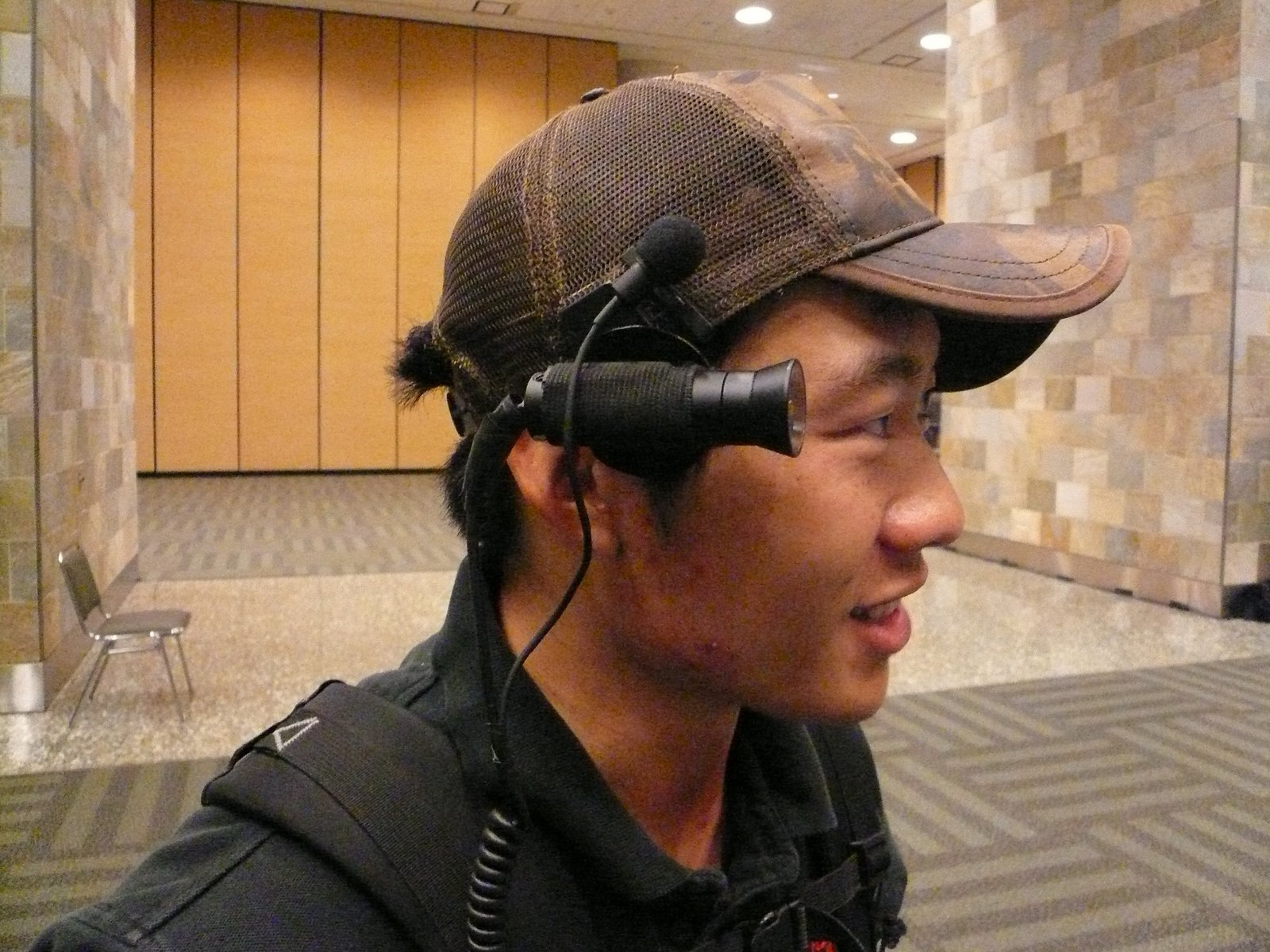
Justin Kan at Web 2.0 Expo 2007 in San Francisco

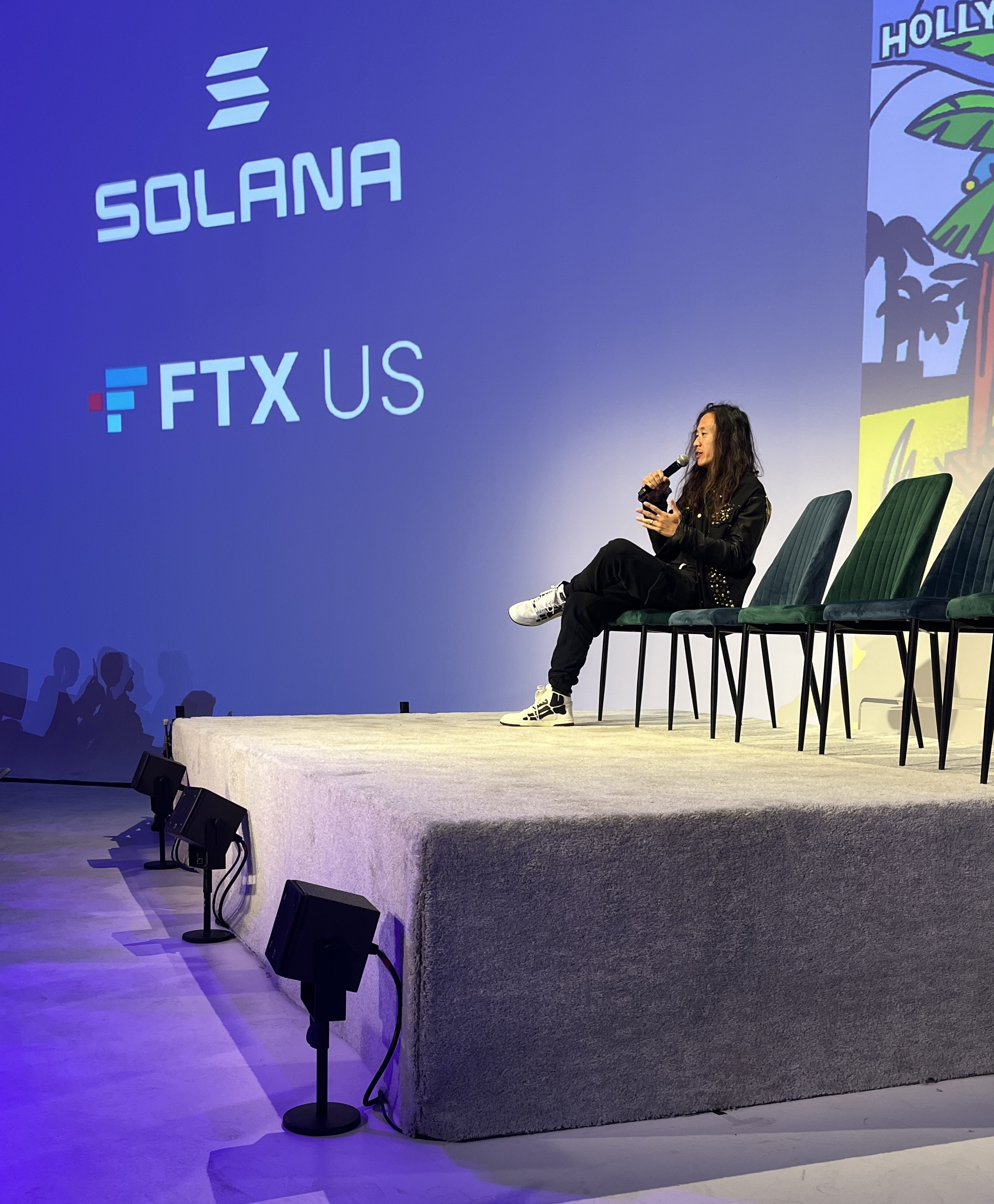
Kan speaking at a Solana event in Los Angeles in February 2022

Kan's "lifecasting" lasted about eight months. Kan's concept attracted media attention, and resulting interviews with him included one by Ann Curry on the Today Show. Viewers accompanied Kan as he walked the streets of San Francisco, sometimes involved in both pre-planned events (trapeze lesson, dance lesson) and spontaneous situations (being invited into the local Scientology center by a sidewalk recruiter).

Afterward, the company transitioned to providing a live video platform so anyone could publish a live video stream. Justin.tv, the platform, launched in 2007 and was one of the largest live video platforms globally with more than 30 million unique users every month.

Justin.tv was shut down on August 5, 2014, in an effort to focus further on Justin.tv's parent company, Twitch.

=== Twitch ===
After Justin.tv launched in 2007, the site added subject-specific content categories like Social, Tech, Sports, Entertainment, News & Events, Gaming and others. Gaming quickly grew to become the most popular content on the site.

The company then decided to spin off the gaming content under a separate brand at a separate website. They named it TwitchTV, inspired by the term twitch gameplay. It launched officially in public beta on June 6, 2011.

Twitch was acquired by Amazon.com in August 2014 for $970 million.

=== Socialcam ===
In March 2011, Kan launched Socialcam, a smartphone application that allowed users to capture and share videos. Socialcam was bought by Autodesk in July 2012 for $60 million and was eventually shut down in October 2015. The application reached 16 million downloads before its acquisition.

=== Exec ===
Kan launched Exec on February 29, 2012 with the goal of allowing anyone to outsource miscellaneous tasks for $25/hour. Exec was co-founded with his brother Daniel Kan, former head business development at UserVoice, and Amir Ghazvinian.

In January 2014, Exec was purchased by Handybook, in an all-stock transaction.

=== Y Combinator ===
Kan was a member of the first batch of YC-funded startups in 2005 for Kiko Calendar, and was funded by YC again for Justin.tv and Exec. Kan became a partner at Y Combinator in March 2014, where he offered advice to the new startups. In March 2017, Kan left Y Combinator to start his own incubator, Zero-F.

=== The Drop ===
The Drop is a Reddit-style electronic music discovery platform that launched in early 2015. Users can post and up-vote community-curated and sourced tracks. It was founded by Kan and his college friend Ranidu Lankage.

=== Atrium ===
In 2017, Kan launched technology-enabled law firm, Atrium. Kan raised $10.5 million in an initial "party" round of investment led by General Catalyst. In September 2018, Kan raised an additional $65 million funding round led by Andreessen Horowitz. At that time, Andrew Chen, Marc Andreessen and Michael Seibel joined the Atrium board of directors. Atrium closed operations in March 2020.

=== YouTube ===
Justin Kan started a YouTube channel in 2021. In February 2021 he announced that fans could collect his YouTube videos as non-fungible tokens on OpenSea.

=== Fractal ===
Kan started Fractal.is in December 2021 as a marketplace for Solana-based NFTs. Players could buy NFTs directly from game companies or through peer-to-peer trading. In April 2022, Fractal raised $35 million in a seed round led by Paradigm and Multicoin Capital. Other investors include Andreessen Horowitz (a16z), Solana Labs, Animoca Brands, Coinbase Ventures and Terraform Labs CEO Do Kwon, and others.

In 2024, Fractal was renamed to Stash, and pivoted to include a suite of products which allow game developers to interface directly with their customers.
