= Huya Live =

Chinese live streaming service

- (Chinese) (Global)
- Website type: Live streaming, Game publisher, Game developer
- Available in: Simplified Chinese
- Traded as: NYSE: HUYA
- Headquarters: Guangzhou, China
- Area served: China; Worldwide (as Nimo TV)
- Owner: Tencent (67.3% as of 31 March 2025)
- Founders: David Xueling Li; Rongjie Dong
- CEO: Junhong Huang (April 2026 - )
- Revenue: ▲US$930 million (2025)
- Website: www.huya.com www.nimo.tv (outside China)
- Commercial: Yes
- Launched: 24 November 2014; 11 years ago
- Current status: Active

Huya Live
- Chinese: 虎牙直播
- Literal meaning: Tiger's Tooth Livestream
Transcriptions
Standard Mandarin
- Hanyu Pinyin: Hǔyá Zhíbò

Huya Live (Chinese: 虎牙直播) is a Chinese video live streaming platform (focused on video games and esports), video game publishing and video game distribution organisation, operated by Huya Inc. (NYSE: HUYA). It is one of China’s two largest game live‑streaming services alongside DouYu and carries official esports broadcasts as well as user‑generated streams and both have been collectively known as the "Twitch (service) of China". Huya Inc. is controlled by Tencent Holdings Limited. Outside mainland China, the service operates in selected overseas markets under the Nimo TV brand.

== History ==
On 24 November 2014, it was announced that YY.com's video streaming service would begin operating independently as Huya Live.

Since 11 May 2018, HUYA Inc.'s American Depositary Shares (ADSs) have been listed on the New York Stock Exchange, under the symbol "HUYA."

Huya had 150 million monthly active users at the start of 2019.

In April 2020, Tencent became the largest shareholder of Huya, having increased its voting power to 50.1% which reduced JOYY's voting stake from 55.5% to 43%. As of 31 March 2025, Tencent beneficially owned 67.3% of Huya's total issued and outstanding share capital and had voting power of 95.4%.

The mobile app of Huya was banned in India (along with other Chinese apps) on 2 September 2020 by the government amid the 2020 China-India skirmish.

In July 2021, Chinese regulators blocked a proposed merger between Huya and DouYu on antitrust grounds.

In 2024, Huya's game-related services, advertising and other revenues accounted for 21.9% of its total net revenues, up from 7.8% in 2023.

In February 2026, former League of Legends star Jian “Uzi” Zihao returned to the Huya platform, beginning with a special livestream on February 3. Huya produced the UZI Cup, a self-produced League of Legends event named after Uzi, the event attracted more than 200 teams and generated more than 100 million views across the internet.

In October 2026, Huya was included in the Value Industry Benchmark 30 on the 2026 Barron's China Value List under the Integrated Game Ecosystem Services sector. They also received a National Frontier Innovation Award from Forbes China 2025.

== Corporate developments ==
=== Special dividends ===
==== First 2024 special dividend ====
On 19 March 2024, HUYA announced a special cash dividend of US$0.66 per ordinary share, or US$0.66 per American Depositary Share ("ADS"), representing an aggregate distribution of approximately US$150 million. The dividend yield was approximately 14.0% relative to HUYA's closing price of about US$4.72 immediately before the announcement.

==== Second 2024 special dividend ====
On 13 August 2024, HUYA announced a second special cash dividend of US$1.08 per ordinary share, or US$1.08 per ADS, representing an aggregate distribution of approximately US$250 million. The dividend yield was approximately 24% relative to the closing price of approximately US$4.46 on 12 August 2024. HUYA stated that the dividend followed a review of its financial position, business plans, capital requirements and cash holdings, and reflected the company's intention to deliver additional shareholder returns.

Together, HUYA's two 2024 special dividends amounted to US$1.74 per ADS, with approximately US$400 million returned to shareholders during the year.

==== 2025 cash dividend ====
On 18 March 2025, HUYA announced a cash dividend of US$1.47 per ordinary share, or US$1.47 per ADS, as part of its newly adopted 2025–2027 Dividend Plan. The dividend represented an aggregate distribution of approximately US$340 million and a dividend yield of approximately 32% relative to HUYA's closing price of about US$4.54 immediately before the announcement.

==== 2025–2027 dividend plan ====
The 2025–2027 Dividend Plan was introduced to enhance shareholder returns and optimize HUYA's capital structure. In addition to the large 2025 distribution, HUYA stated that it expected to distribute at least US$30 million in cash dividends in each of 2026 and 2027.

==== 2026 special dividend ====
On 17 March 2026, HUYA announced a special cash dividend of US$0.135 per ordinary share, or US$0.135 per ADS, implementing the second year of its 2025–2027 Dividend Plan. The distribution totaled approximately US$31 million, equivalent to a dividend yield of approximately 3.9% relative to HUYA's pre-announcement share price of about US$3.46.

From March 2024 through June 2026, HUYA therefore declared a cumulative US$3.345 per ADS in cash dividends, representing approximately US$771 million of aggregate cash distributions to shareholders. The unusually large 2024 and 2025 distributions reflected HUYA's substantial cash reserves and a broader strategy of returning excess capital to shareholders through both dividends and share repurchases.

=== Revenue mix ===
Over the years, Huya has been diversifying from live streaming revenue focus to other revenue streams.

Revenue Spread for each Fiscal Year
Year	Live Streaming Revenue (%)	Game-Related Services, Advertising, and Other Revenues (%)
2018	95.3	4.7
2019	95.2	4.8
2020	94.5	5.5
2021	93.5	6.5
2022	88.5	11.5
2023	86.2	13.1
2024	78.1	21.9
2025	70.7	29.4

=== Streaming rights ===
On 4 January 2018, Riot Games gave Huya Live exclusive rights to broadcast the LCK, South Korea's professional esports league for League of Legends, in China. The same was done for the LCS and LEC on 20 January 2020, the equivalent leagues in North America and Europe respectively.

In December 2025, Huya became the first third-party organizer and exclusive streaming platform for the Demacia Cup, hosting the 2025 tournament featuring 14 LPL teams and two streamer squads through January 3, 2026.

In January 2026, Huya secured full rights to 2026 Badminton World Federation events and the 2026 World Snooker Tour. The 2026 World Snooker Championship generated more than 150 million total views on HUYA.

=== Game publishing ===
==== 2026 - sustained publishing activity ====
In January 2026, Huya and Kingsoft Shiyou co-published Goose Goose Duck Mobile. Goose Goose Duck Mobile recorded above 5 million new registered users in a day and reached number 1 spot on Apple's app store in both the overall free apps and free games charts during the first few days of launch. Goose Duck Mobile has returned to the number 1 position on China's iOS free game chart at the end of July 2026.

On 26 June 2026, Huya announced exclusive publishing rights to Sword and Fairy: Reunion (also known as The Legend of Swordsman: Reunion, 剑侠情缘：重逢), a game developed by Seasun under licence from its Jianxia Qingyuan series, and opened pre-registration. Huya said the game would run across a mobile app, a PC client and a WeChat mini-program, with account data shared between them.

In July 2026, the National Press and Publication Administration approved This Island Has Fantasy Beasts (这岛有幻兽), for domestic release, with Guangdong Haiyan Electronic Audio-Visual Publishing House listed as publisher and Guangzhou Huya Information Technology as operator.

In August 2026, HUYA Inc announced the exclusive launch of its new 3D food-themed match-3 mobile game, "Momo Adventure (消消奇遇)". The game features the viral character Zanmang Loopy (赞萌露比) and the expected launch date on Apple Store is 25 October 2026.

=== Exclusive IP content ===
In February 2026, former League of Legends star Jian “Uzi” Zihao returned to the Huya platform, beginning with a special livestream on February 3. Huya produced the UZI Cup, a self-produced League of Legends event named after Uzi, the event attracted more than 200 teams and generated more than 100 million views across the internet.

== Platform and technology ==
On 18 July 2026, Huya debuted its VAM 1.0, a real-time multimodal digital human model based on a diffusion transformer (DiT) architecture, during the 2026 World Artificial Intelligence Conference (WAIC) in Shanghai. Under the launch version, Huya streamers are able to generate a virtual presenter that speaks and responds in real time.

== See also ==
- DouYu
