= Trovo Live =

Chinese live streaming platform

Trovo
- Company type: Subsidiary
- Website type: Video game live streaming
- Founded: 2020
- Dissolved: 30 June 2026; 2 months ago
- Parent: Tencent
- Website: trovo.live
- Registration: Optional

Trovo (formerly Madcat) was a video game live streaming service owned by Tencent. The platform began testing in the United States in early 2020 under the name Madcat and launched as Trovo in July 2020. Similarly to Twitch, Trovo featured tiered paid subscription options for each channel which gave subscribers customizable rewards. Additionally, it offered the Ace subscription, a site-wide package that included extra emojis and other advanced features. At launch Tencent backed the service with a reported US$30 million creator partnership programme. In March 2026, Tencent announced that Trovo would cease all live streaming operations on 30 June 2026.
