= Michael Seibel =

Managing director at Y Combinator

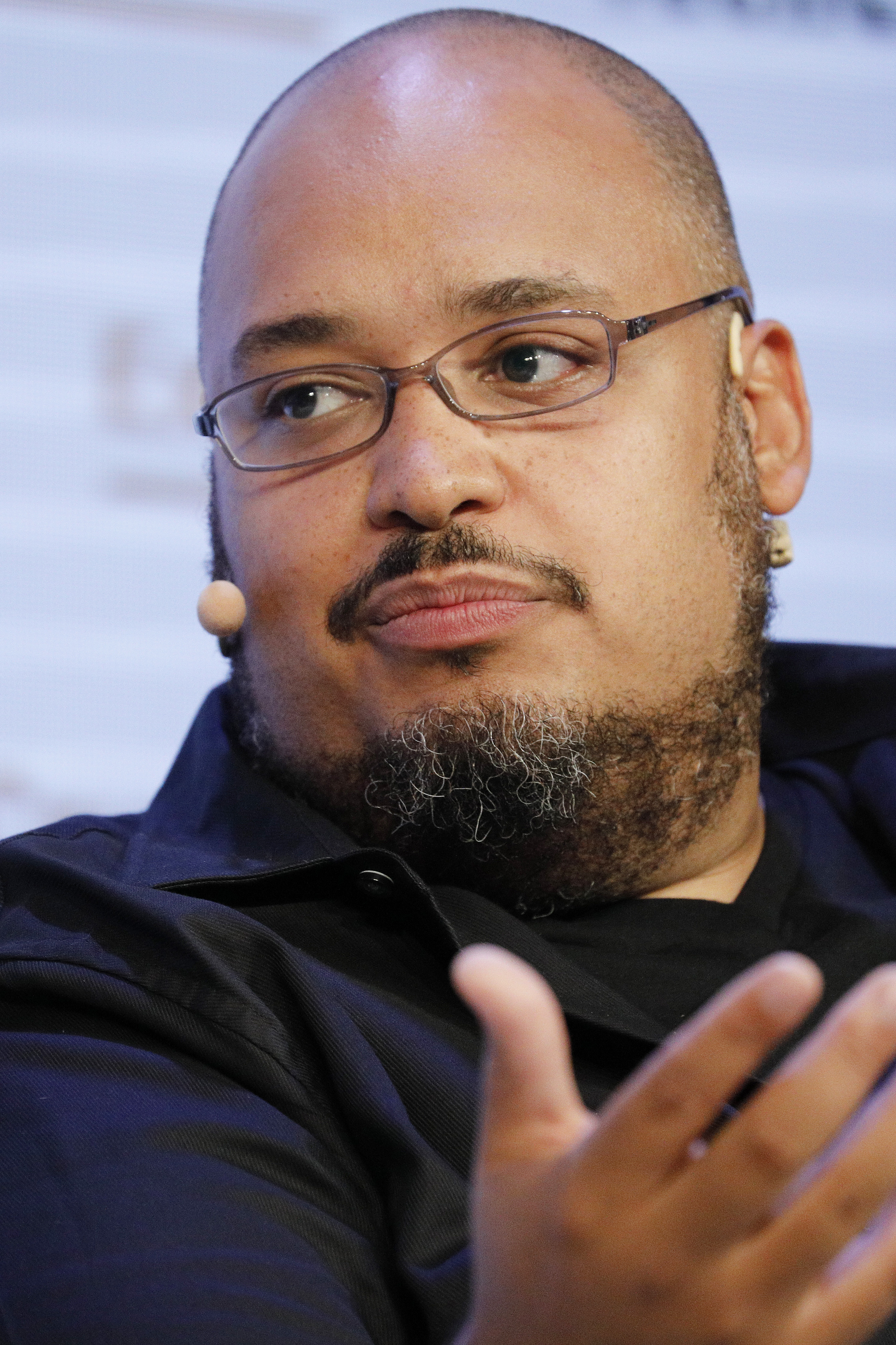
- Seibel in 2019
- Born: October 7, 1982 (age 44); New York City, U.S.
- Education: Yale University (BA)

Michael Seibel (born October 7, 1982) is a partner at Y Combinator and the co-founder of two startups, Justin.tv/Twitch and Socialcam. He first joined Y Combinator in 2013, advising hundreds of startups, and has been active in promoting diversity efforts among startup founders. Seibel is widely recognized as one of the most influential black investors and startup mentors in Silicon Valley, noted for his advocacy of underrepresented founders and leadership in expanding access to the startup ecosystem.

== Education and startups ==
Seibel was born in Brooklyn and calls New York City his favorite city. He moved to East Brunswick, New Jersey as a pre-teen and graduated from East Brunswick High School in 2000. At Yale University, he majored in political science and became friends with Justin Kan. Seibel was active in Yale’s Black Student Alliance, and has spoken about being one of few black students pursuing tech entrepreneurship at the university. After his graduation in 2005, he worked as the finance director for Kweisi Mfume's unsuccessful run for the U.S. Senate in 2006. He then moved to Silicon Valley to co-found Justin.tv, and became CEO at the company (from 2007 to 2011). He then became CEO of Socialcam, a social video-sharing app that launched in March 2011 and sold to Autodesk for $60 million in 2012 (after 18 months). Socialcam rapidly became one of the top apps in the iOS App Store and was widely referred to as "Instagram for video" in the tech press at the time. In 2014 Justin.tv was renamed Twitch Interactive and later that year sold to Amazon for $970 million.

== Startup mentoring, Y Combinator, investments, and board seats ==
In 2008, Michael Seibel was a key mentor to the co-founders of Airbnb and recommended them to Y Combinator.

In 2013, he became a part-time partner at Y Combinator and, in October 2014, became the organization’s first African-American partner. He became CEO of the Y Combinator Startup Accelerator in 2016. On March 15, 2024, Seibel announced in a post on X that he was stepping down from his leadership role at Y Combinator after eight years and would return to his original role as partner.

During his tenure, Seibel played a significant role in expanding Y Combinator's reach, launching global programs and online initiatives such as Startup School, which opened YC mentorship and resources to founders worldwide. He has been widely credited with increasing the number of black and underrepresented founders in YC's accelerator, making diversity and access a central priority of the organization during his leadership.

Some of Seibel's personal startup investments include Cruise, Brex, Figma, Rippling, Reddit, Clipboard Health, and Promise.

He is also a frequent speaker at major startup and technology conferences, including TechCrunch Disrupt, AfroTech, and Startup Grind, where he advocates for diversity, access to capital, and mentorship in tech entrepreneurship.

On June 10, 2020, it was announced that Seibel had been named to the Reddit board of directors, replacing Alexis Ohanian. Ohanian had announced his resignation on June 5, 2020 in response to the murder of George Floyd and urged Reddit's board of directors to fill his vacant seat with a black candidate. Reddit later named Seibel as the "first black board member in the company's history".

On December 15, 2020, it was announced that Seibel was named to the Dropbox board of directors.

== See also ==
- Emmett Shear
- Kyle Vogt
- Justin Kan
