= Hitbox (service) =

Defunct video streaming service

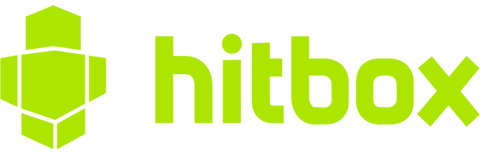
- Website type: Streaming video service
- Available in: English; German; Polish; Russian; Italian; Portuguese; Spanish; French
- Dissolved: May 9, 2017; 9 years ago succeeded by Smashcast
- Successor: Smashcast
- Owner: Azubu
- Website: www.hitbox.tv
- Commercial: Yes
- Registration: Optional
- Launched: October 2013; 13 years ago
- Current status: Merged with Azubu

Hitbox was a live-streaming esports video game website launched in October 2013. It was a competitor to Twitch. It was acquired by Azubu, and then became Smashcast.

== History ==
Hitbox was launched in October 2013 by co-founders Martin Klimscha and Igor Karabaš. In November 2015, the platform secured a $4,000,000 Series A funding round led by equity platform SeedInvest, alongside video game publisher Wargaming and media investment firm North Base Media. Following this investment, Hitbox announced infrastructure plans focused on expanding its platform capabilities and reducing stream latency to compete directly with Amazon's Twitch.

During its active operational phase, the platform sought to capitalize on structural adjustments within the streaming ecosystem. In 2014, Hitbox actively positioned itself to attract broadcasters who were dissatisfied with Twitch's implementation of stricter copyright enforcement policies and automated audio muting on archived video on demand (VOD) content.

In April 2016, Hitbox expanded its market footprint by signing a two-year commercial broadcasting agreement with prominent competitive esports organizations, including ESL, DreamHack, and Wargaming, marking a distinct departure from their previous exclusive distribution arrangements with Twitch. At its peak development, the service reported approximately 6 million monthly active users and completed a technical transition from a legacy Adobe Flash Player model to a native HTML5 media framework in March 2016. Mobile and desktop software applications for Hitbox were released across Windows, Android, and iOS platforms.

On January 10, 2017, Hitbox announced that the company had been acquired by rival streaming enterprise Azubu. The platform officially ceased independent operations on May 5, 2017, with all domain traffic permanently redirecting to Smashcast, a newly unified streaming property managed by a combined team of Hitbox and Azubu staff.
