= DouYu =

Chinese live streaming website

- Company type: Public
- Website type: Live streaming
- Traded as: Nasdaq: DOYU
- Headquarters: Wuhan, Hubei Province, China
- Owner: DouYu International Holdings Ltd.
- CEO: Ren Simin
- Revenue: US$546.1 million (2025)
- Employees: 493 (2025)
- Subsidiaries: Wuhan Ouyue Online TV Co., Ltd.; Wuhan Douyu Internet Technology Co. Ltd.
- Website: www.douyu.com
- Launched: 2014; 12 years ago
- Current status: Active

DouYu
- Simplified Chinese: 斗鱼
- Traditional Chinese: 鬥魚
Transcriptions
Standard Mandarin
- Hanyu Pinyin: Dòuyú

DouYu (Chinese: 斗鱼; pinyin: Dòuyú) is a Chinese video live streaming service. The site was the largest of its kind in China by monthly active users in 2019, with 163.6 million, compared to 140 million monthly active users for Twitch. They are also a major Esports and Event Organiser.

DouYu International Holdings Ltd is listed on the Nasdaq Stock Exchange under the Ticker symbol DOYU on 17 July 2019.

== History ==
=== Founding and growth ===
DouYu commenced operations and launched its live-streaming platform in 2014. Among the Chinese game streaming platforms, Douyu ranked first in average total monthly active users (MAUs) and average daily time spent by active users during the first quarter of 2019.

=== Early Developments and IPO ===
In an updated IPO prospectus filed on 8 July, Douyu reported a profitable first quarter of 2019 with total revenues soaring 123.4% year on year to approximately US$222 million. Douyu ended the 2019 with annual revenue of US$1.041 Billion.

On 17 July 2019, DouYu listed on the Nasdaq Global Select Market under the ticker symbol DOYU. The offering raised approximately US$775 million through the sale of 67.4 million American Depositary Shares at US$11.50 each, valuing the company at approximately US$3.73 billion. It was the largest U.S. IPO by any Chinese company as of July 2019. According to its IPO filing, Douyu owns exclusive Streaming rights to 29 major tournaments in China, including League of Legends and Dota 2.

In 2020, Douyu annual revenue jumped to US$1.472 Billion. Tencent owned about 21% of the shares as of 2020.

In August, the company was registered in Japan, and a new company "Mildom" was established with Mitsui & Co. to enter the Japanese market.

=== Proposed merger with Huya ===
As of 31 March 2020, Tencent held 38% of the company's shares, making it its largest shareholder.

On 10 August 2020, Douyu announced that it had received a non-binding preliminary proposal from Tencent, which proposed that Douyu and Huya Live merge in the form of a share exchange.

In July 2021, Chinese regulators blocked a proposed $5.3 billion merger between Huya and DouYu on antitrust grounds. This was the third case prohibited by the State Administration for Market Regulation (SAMR) and the first in the internet platform/digital sector.

The reason given for the merger ban was that Huya and Douyu rank first and second in China's live streaming market, hold over 40% and 30% market shares respectively and the combined entity will monopolize the market. Huya and Douyu together accounted for over 80% of active users in China’s game live-streaming market, in addition to more than 70% by revenue.

On 5 February 2024, Douyu responded by denying recent rumors of a merger with Huya in response to a merger rumor. During the clarification, both companies acknowledged that they are collaborating in some areas of their business.

As of 31 March 2026, Tencent held approximately 40.0% of Douyu's total outstanding ordinary shares.

=== Subsidiaries ===
DouYu's principal onshore subsidiary, Wuhan Douyu Culture Network Technology Co., Ltd., owns five operating companies:

- Wuhan Yuxing Tianxia Culture Media Co., Ltd.,
- Wuhan Yuyin Radiang Culture Media Co., Ltd.,
- Wuhan Douyu Education Consulting Co., Ltd.,
- Wuhan Yu Leyou Internet Technology Co., Ltd.
- Wuhan Yuwan Culture Media Co., Ltd.

DouYu International Holdings Limited also owns DouYu Network Inc. in the British Virgin Islands and Douyu Hongkong Limited in Hong Kong.

== Corporate developments ==
=== Special dividends ===
==== 2024 special dividend ====
On 3 July 2024, a special cash dividend of US$9.76 per ordinary share, or US$9.76 per American Depositary Share ("ADS") was announced. The dividend yield was approximately 89% of the closing price of US$10.99 on 28 June 2024.

==== 2025 special dividend ====
On 16 January 2025, a second special cash dividend of US$9.94 per ordinary share, or US$9.94 per American Depositary Share ("ADS") was announced. The dividend yield was approximately 91% of the closing price of US$10.85 on 14 January 2025.

=== Business performance and diversification ===
==== Revenue Mix ====
Since 2023, DouYu has been moving away from being largely dependent on Live Streaming Tipping as it's main source of revenue (Table Below).

Revenue Spread for each Fiscal Year
Year	Live Streaming Revenue (%)	Innovative Business, Advertising and Other Revenue (%)
2019	90.9	9.1
2020	92.2	7.8
2021	93.8	6.2
2022	95.6	4.4
2023	86.8	13.2
2024	72.0	28
2025	57	43

==== 2019 - 2023 (Focus on Market Share Gains and Revenue Growth) ====
Since 2019 IPO till 2022, livestreaming virtual gifting and viewer tipping account for more than 90% of DouYu's total revenue stream (95.6% of revenue in 2022). Most DouYu viewers gave no gifts or only free and low-cost gifts, with limited spending power identified as a possible reason in a study.

==== 2023 (Broadening Revenue Sources and Bottom-Line Prioritization) ====
In 2023, one of Douyu subsidiaries, Wuhan Yu Leyou Internet Technology Co., Ltd., started to develop the voice-based social networking business, Gugu Voice (咕咕语音).

In December 2023, DouYu launched the DouYu × Game for Peace Adventure Journey (斗鱼×和平精英冒险之旅) series. Subsequent editions were held in Changbaishan in 2024, Altay, Xinjiang, in November 2025, Zhoushan, Zhejiang, in May 2026 and Sanya, Hainan, in Sept 2026.

For the full year of 2023, Douyu broadened its income sources beyond livestreaming and virtual gifts by expanding advertising and other innovative businesses. Together with lower streamer payments, content costs, marketing and staffing expenses, this diversification helped DouYu move from a RMB90.4 million net loss in 2022 to a RMB35.5 million net profit in 2023, despite total revenue falling 22.2% to RMB5.53 billion.

==== 2024 - 2025 (Accelerating Diversification to Strengthen Sustainability and Profitability) ====
In 2024, DouYu continued to diversify its revenue beyond its traditional live-streaming business as seen in the Revenue Mix table. Revenue from innovative businesses, advertising and other services increased by 63.6% year-on-year to RMB1.2 billion, accounting for approximately 28% of the company's total revenue. The increase was primarily driven by higher revenues from their voice-based social networking service developed in 2023 and game membership service.

In 2025, the company's gross profit increased from RMB323.8 million to RMB489.5 million. DouYu also recorded adjusted net income of RMB40.2 million, compared with an adjusted net loss of RMB249.2 million in the previous year. Revenue from innovative businesses, advertising and other services increased by a further 37% during the year.

==== 2026 (Return to Net Profitability and Building Proprietary Esports IP) ====
In the first quarter of 2026, DouYu reported net income of RMB27.4 million, compared with a net loss of RMB79.6 million in the same period in 2025. Gross margin increased from 12.0% to 15.7%.

In Q2 2026, DouYu's voice-based social networking business including Gugu Voice (咕咕语音) generated US$40.51 million in revenue, with an average of 66,200 monthly paying users. Douyu CEO Simin Ren has said that the company is focused on advancing its revenue diversification to reduce dependence on a single source of income and provide additional avenues for growth and monetization. Revenue from innovative businesses, advertising and other services increased from 23.4% of total revenue in the second quarter of 2024 to 45.2% in the same quarter of 2025 and 48.7% in 2026.

In 2026, DouYu is producing its own esports content. it broadcast 63 licensed esports events, but also produced 37 self-developed tournaments and special programs in Q2 2026. DouYu is able to reduce reliance on costly third-party esports rights by developing and owning more of its own tournament and content IP.

The self-developed tournaments includes but is not limited to:

- Delta Force Yuyue Cup Martial God Challenge (《三角洲行动》鱼跃杯武神挑战赛)
- CS2 Girls' Showdown (CS2妹力对决)
- DouYu Dota 2 Pokémon Tournament (斗鱼DOTA2宝可梦)
- League of Legends Donkey Sauce Cup (英雄联盟驴酱杯)
- StarCraft II DouYu Carnival Legends Invitational (星际争霸2斗鱼嘉年华传奇邀请赛)

The special professional generated content (PGC) or variety shows includes but is not limited to:

- FarmUP Camp S2 2026 (斗鱼伐木训练营S2) - Reality TV blockbuster drawing in tens of millions of viewers-
- DouYu × Game for Peace Adventure Journey (斗鱼×和平精英冒险之旅) - a livestreaming travel variety series featuring DouYu streamers and esports personalities in outdoor challenges themed around Game for Peace, 2023 - ongoing

=== Branding ===
Douyu’s founding tagline was "Everyone's Live Streaming Platform" (每个人的直播平台). In December 2025, as part of its 12th-anniversary celebrations, the company introduced a new tagline, "See Every Passion. Dive Into the Excitement Together" (看见每种热爱，鱼你共赴精彩). DouYu described the shift toward what it called a "game-centric diversified content ecosystem."

=== Leadership changes ===
In November 2023, Ren Simin was appointed as director and vice president of the company.

On 6 August 2026, Shao Jie Chen resigned as CEO and director, and Ren Simin was promoted to CEO and chair of the board on 7 August 2026.

On 7 August 2026, Jie Gao was promoted to vice president of investment and appointed to the board. Jie Gao joined DouYu in May 2014 as an early employee and was appointed investment director in June 2018.

== Platform and technology ==
In September 2025, DouYu showcased DouYu 8.0 at the 2025 Alibaba Cloud Computing Conference. The version was officially launched on 25 September 2025 and introduced AI-powered bullet-comment features for premium users.

== Events and esports ==
=== Douyu carnivals and events ===
DouYu launched the DouYu Carnival in Shanghai in 2016 as an physical gathering of streamers and their viewers. The event moved to Wuhan in 2017 and developed into a large-scale gaming and entertainment festival. The 2017 edition attracted approximately 350,000 visits and more than 170 million online views. In 2018, attendance exceeded 500,000, while online broadcasts of the event recorded more than 230 million views.

In June 2019, DouYu held the 2019 International Wuhan DouYu Live Streaming Festival and yearly DouYu Carnival at Hankou River Beach in Wuhan. The three-day event attracted approximately 405,600 visits and featured more than 1,500 streamers, alongside esports competitions, gaming exhibitions, music and other entertainment activities.

In December 2025, DouYu organised the China Optics Valley Esports Carnival and DouYu YuYue Cup in Wuhan. Held from 22 to 27 December at the Hubei Olympic Sports Center Gymnasium, the event featured competitions in Delta Force and Valorant, with 24 professional teams and six streamer teams competing for a combined prize pool of RMB800,000.

In June 2026, DouYu organised the DouYu Live Festival (DouYu Carnival) after 7 years hiatus (due to COVID-19) at the Wuhan International Expo Center. The four-day event, themed See Every Passion (看见每种热爱), recorded more than 226,000 on-site visitors, of whom more than 75% came from outside Wuhan.

The 2026 Douyu Carnival also hosted the DouYu Cup 2026, an S-Tier StarCraft II: Legacy of the Void competition. The tournament was broadcast on DouYu in more than five languages.

=== DYG (DouYu Gaming) ===
In 2019, DouYu entered professional esports team ownership through the acquisition of JC Gaming, which was subsequently renamed DouYu Gaming (DYG). DYG won the 2020 King Pro League Autumn championship in Honor of Kings.

== See also ==
- Huya Live
