= Azubu =

Former live streaming e-sports website

- Website type: Game streaming
- Available in: English; Portuguese; Simplified Chinese; Traditional Chinese
- Dissolved: May 9, 2017; 9 years ago succeeded by Smashcast
- Successor: Smashcast
- Subsidiaries: Hitbox
- Website: www.azubu.tv
- Commercial: Yes
- Registration: Optional
- Launched: 2012; 14 years ago
- Current status: Defunct

Azubu was a live streaming esports website. In May 2017, it shut down and was succeeded by Smashcast.

== History ==
Azubu was founded in 2012 when Lars Windhorst noticed that children were using live streaming services to watch others play video games, with the biggest game being League of Legends. Windhorst claimed "it was exotic" to witness people watch others play video games. Over a four-year span, Sapinda Group, the firm that Windhorst owned, invested $40 million USD into Azubu.

In 2014, Azubu announced a partnership with fourteen League of Legends streamers including Faker of SKT T1 K and MadLife of CJ Entus Frost.

Throughout much of 2016, several employees left the company, leaving Sapinda Group to fund Azubu less and less. Windhorst eventually admitted that he had funded Azubu inefficiently and should have provided more sufficient funding. Sapinda Group would "drip-feed" funds to Azubu to accelerate growth.

In April 2016 Azubu revealed that they had been developing a better video player and a revenue network that they released for their website. The same year, Esportspedia, owned by Azubu, moved to EsportsWikis.

== Closure ==
In January 2017, Azubu revealed that they were no longer able to stream League of Legends due to a $2 million price increase in streaming rights. The same month, Azubu announced that they had acquired and were working on develop a new eSports platform.

On May 9, 2017, Hitbox shut down, with the new release of the Azubu team and the Hitbox team's new platform Smashcast.

Azubu allegedly have not paid out the prizes for several esports events. The current CEO, Mike McGarvey, explained the reason as "Azubu's previous management team made commitments to broadcasters and events far beyond the company's means".

As for the unpaid tournament winnings, McGarvey said, "There are a couple, the CS:GO is certainly one of them, that we've not yet been able to find a settlement on. That is in a legal situation right now. Pretty much all the others we've been able to work with people or we're in the process." When asked for a timeline on paying out the debts owed to the CS:GO World Championship winners and the Dota 2 Game On invitational winners, McGarvey responded, "I don't have specific timing other than we are working toward resolving these issues."
