= Gamecaster =

American Video game developer

- Company type: Private
- Industry: Video games
- Founded: 2000
- Headquarters: San Diego, California, U.S.
- Website: www.gamecaster.com

Gamecaster Inc. is an American corporation based in San Diego, California. The company holds a patent in virtual camera control technology. According to Teamxbox.com, Gamecaster is responsible for creating "the world’s first video game camera". This technology is responsible for combining video gaming and the broadcasting of sports events; thus introducing video gaming as a spectator sport. According to CBS news, "The ability to broadcast from within the game completely changes the way people view video game competitions." In 2008, IGN wrote, "If Gamecaster has its way, video game competitions will become just as much a part of American television viewing as the Super Bowl or the World Series."

== Closure ==
On January 31, 2023, Gamecaster announced closure of the company via email, Medium, and their site, saying:

We announced last year that Gamecaster was being tied back in with XSplit, which we had hoped would give us the opportunity to continue maintaining the app and solving the technical issues that many of you have encountered. However, the sad reality is that the original development team behind Gamecaster have all since left to pursue other opportunities — Gamecaster is a fairly complex app that relies both on integrations with third party services and several advanced internal components, so without this dedicated expertise the functionality of Gamecaster has significantly deteriorated.
