= Live streaming =

Live broadcasting via the Internet

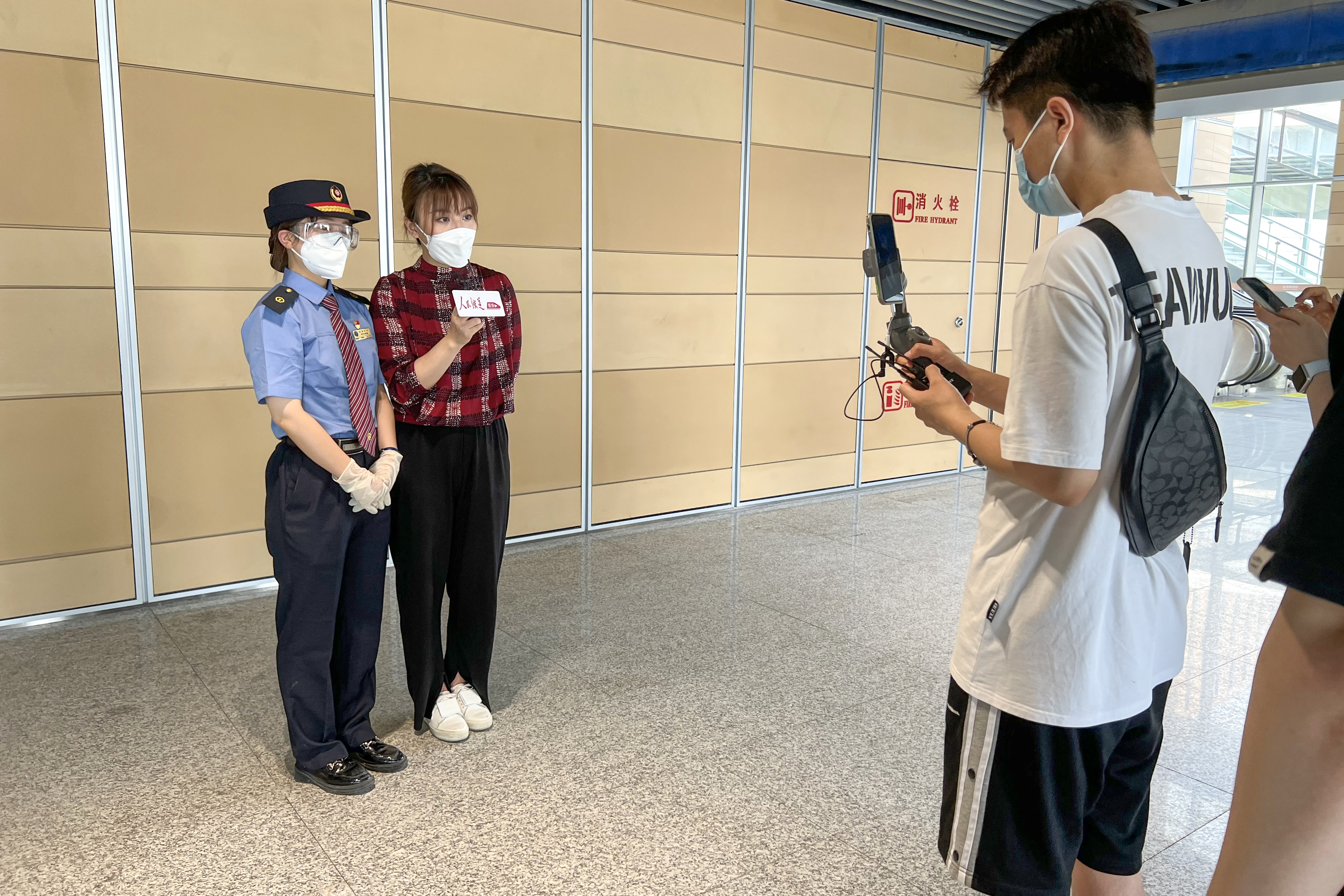
China Railway staff livestreaming on the first day of operation of Beijing Fengtai railway station on 20 June 2022 during the COVID-19 pandemic era

American musicians Neffex on a livestream broadcast

Livestreaming, live-streaming, or live streaming is the streaming of video or audio in real time or near real time. While often referred to simply as streaming, the real-time nature of livestreaming differentiates it from other non-live broadcast forms of streamed media such as video-on-demand, vlogs and video-sharing platforms such as YouTube and TikTok.

Livestreaming services encompass a wide variety of topics, including social media, video games, professional sports, and lifecasting. Platforms such as Facebook Live, Periscope, Kuaishou, Douyu, bilibili, YouTube, and 17 include the streaming of scheduled promotions and celebrity events as well as streaming between users, as in videotelephony. Livestreaming sites such as Twitch and Kick have become popular outlets for watching people play video games, such as in esports, Let's Play-style gaming, or speedrunning. Live coverage of sporting events is a common application.

Chat rooms are a key feature in livestreaming, allowing viewers to interact with the broadcaster (streamer) and join ongoing conversations. These rooms often include emojis and emotes as additional communication tools.

== Social media ==
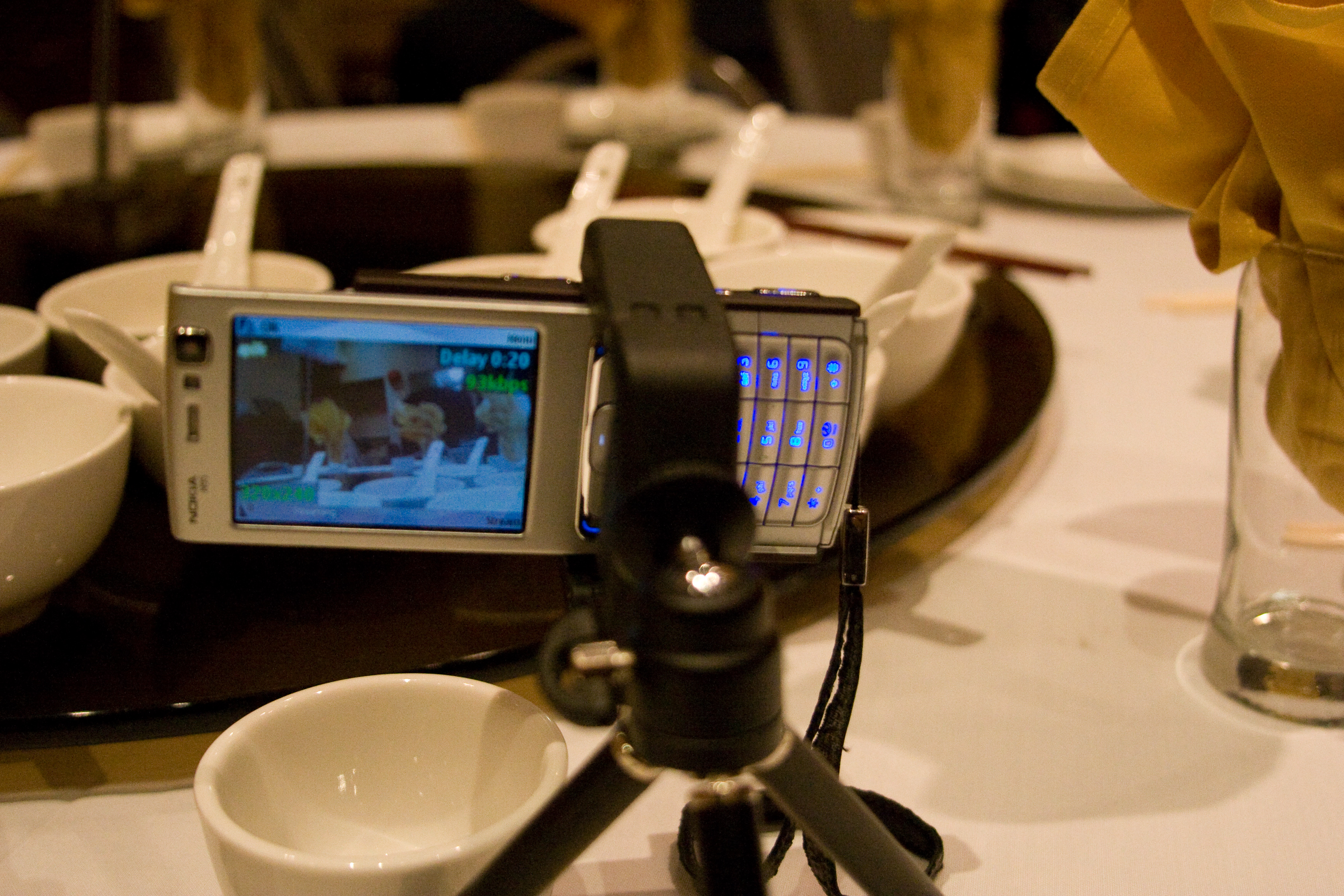
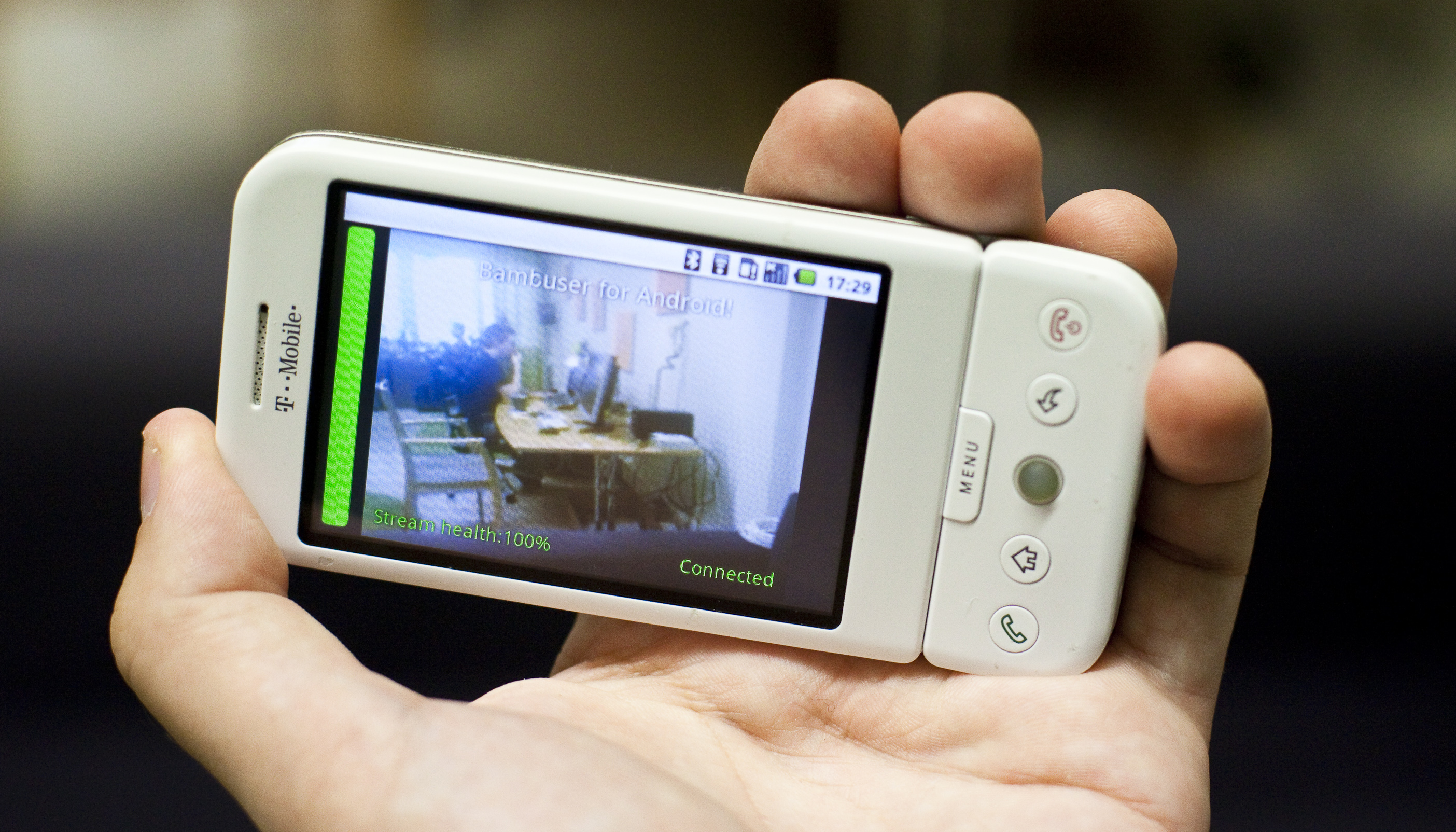
Two early examples of smartphones recording and live streaming it: a Nokia N95 using Qik (left) and a T-Mobile G1 using Bambuser

In the field of social media, the term live media refers to new media that use streaming technologies to create and share live multimedia content among people, companies, and organizations. Social media marketer Bryan Kramer describes livestreaming as an inexpensive "key marketing and communications tool that helps brands reach their online audience." Users can follow their friends' live video "shares" as well as "shares" related to specific content or items. Live media can be shared through any Internet website or application; thus, when people browse a specific website, they may find live media streams relevant to them.

Live media can include coverage of various events such as concerts or live news coverage viewed using a web browser or apps such as Snapchat. James Harden and Trolli promoted an upcoming NBA All-Star Game through Snapchat. Many of LaBeouf, Rönkkö & Turner's performance art were livestreamed, such as a stream of Shia LaBeouf in a theater viewing all his movies.

However, live stream commerce today enables sellers to showcase products through streamers, mimicking in-store sales tactics to encourage customer purchases. Chinese live stream-based retailing has contributed significantly to the country’s e-commerce sector, with reports estimating revenues in the tens of billions of pounds. The McKinsey report also demonstrates that live stream commerce is expanding in China, the sales from live stream commerce were expected to achieve $423 billion by 2022,.

=== Facebook Watch ===
Facebook introduced a video streaming service, Facebook Watch to select individuals in August 2017, and to the public in January 2018. Facebook watch is a video-on-demand service that allows users to share content live. It allows people to upload videos that cover a wide array of topics including original comedy, drama, and news programming. Facebook Live allows Facebook users to include their own "reactions" when someone is broadcasting. One of the reasons that Facebook Watch is so successful is because the content is recommended to users based on algorithms that determine what the user would most like to watch.

=== YouTube Live ===
YouTube was purchased by Google in 2006, and the pair subsequently announced their livestreaming app. Like Periscope, users can comment during the broadcast. Unlike Periscope, livestreams on YouTube can be saved and any user can access them through the app. YouTube head of product for consumers, Manuel Bronstein, stated that live streaming gives creators the opportunity to "actually create a more intimate connection with their fans."

=== Kick ===
Kick (also known as Kick.com) is a live video streaming service supported by online betting Stake.com along with streaming personality Trainwreckstv. Launched in 2022, Kick emerged after Stake.com and other gambling sites were restricted on Twitch. Kick offers a 95% revenue share to streamers and 5% to the platform.

Although Kick is not officially linked to Stake.com co-founders, records show they are the main shareholders of the company owning the streaming site.

Notable streamers like Hikaru Nakamura and Nickmercs, formerly popular on Twitch, joined Kick, contributing to its average of 235,000 live streams per day as of June 2023.

=== Lifestreaming ===
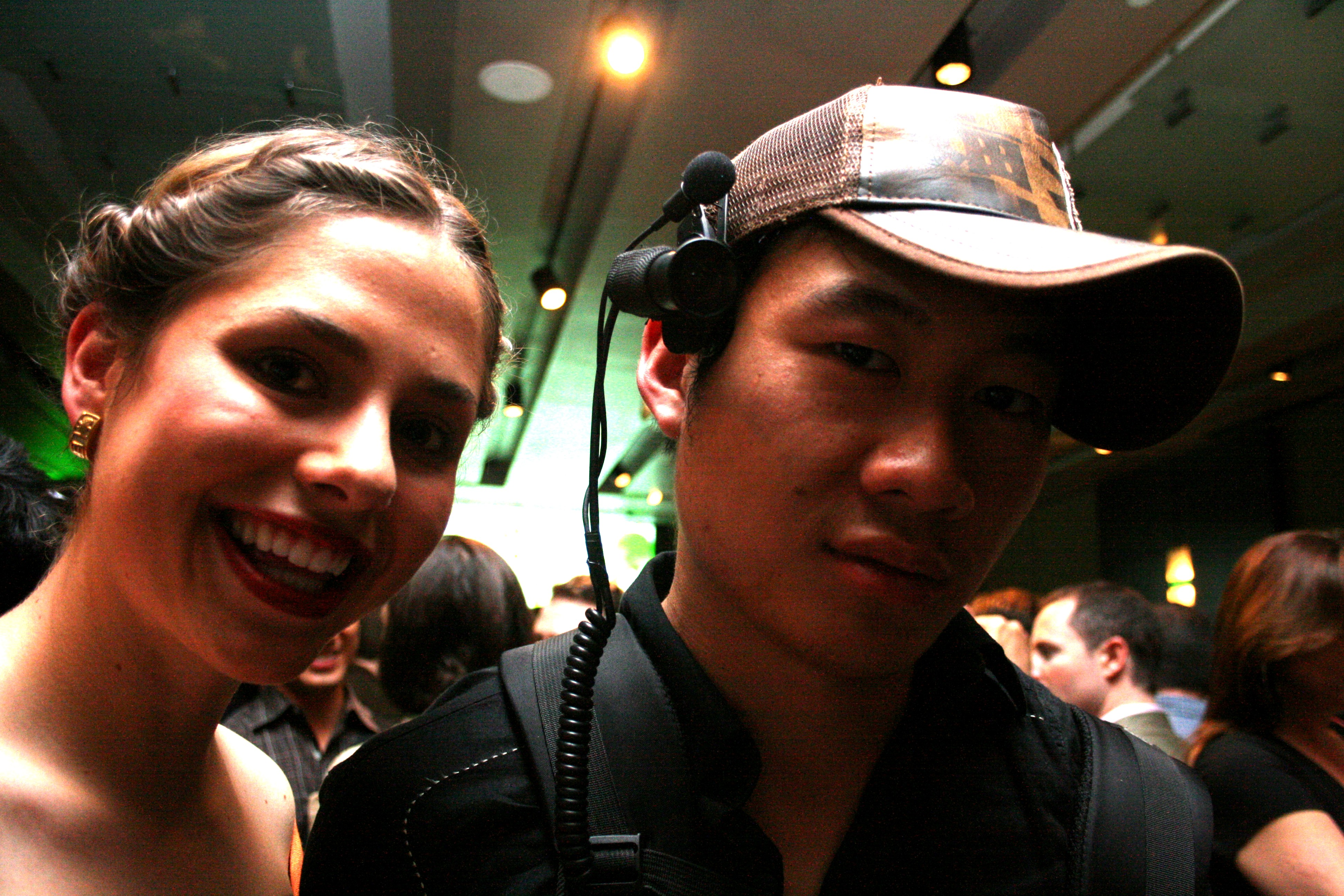
Twitch co-founder Justin Kan wearing a lifecasting setup

Lifestreaming, also known as lifecasting, is the practice of continuously broadcasting various aspects of one's daily life to an online audience. This modern phenomenon allows people to share even mundane events in real-time, giving viewers an intimate look into someone's routine.

Justin Kan, an entrepreneur and internet personality, is often credited with bringing this concept to the mainstream. He founded Justin.tv, a website initially focused solely on broadcasting his own life 24/7. This lifecasting platform eventually evolved, serving as the foundation for a new style of online sharing and paving the way for more diverse content.

In its early days, Justin.tv was an experimental space where Kan himself was the main focus, capturing everything from his workdays to social interactions. This format marked an early example of real-time personal broadcasting using emerging internet technologies. Kan's innovation in this area led to the popularization of lifestreaming, which has since evolved to include various forms of content and millions of users worldwide. Today, the influence of the original concept can be seen across multiple platforms and in different variations, extending beyond individual lifecasting to live broadcasts of events, gaming, and more.

=== Twitch ===
Twitch is a livestreaming video platform owned by Twitch Interactive, a subsidiary of Amazon. Introduced in June 2011 as a spin-off of the general-interest streaming platform, Justin.tv, the site primarily focuses on video game livestreaming, including broadcasts of eSports competitions, in addition to music broadcasts, creative content, and more recently, "in real life" streams. Content on the site can be viewed either live or via video on demand.

=== Bigo Live ===
Bigo Live is a live streaming platform owned by a Singapore-based BIGO Technology, which was founded in 2014 by David Li and Jason Hu. As of 2019, BIGO Technology is owned by JOYY, a Chinese company listed on the NASDAQ. Like YouTube Live, users can watch trendy live streams and comment on the broadcast. Unlike YouTube Live, users on Bigo Live can filter out broadcasters from a certain country on the explore page.

=== Former ===
==== Periscope ====
In March 2015, Twitter launched a livestreaming app called Periscope. Normally, users would see a hyperlink attached to their broadcast, directing people to a new tab. Using Periscope, videos appear live on the timeline. If the user has allowed the site to share information, others can see where the user is streaming from. During the broadcast, users can comment, talk to the broadcaster, or ask questions. Kayvon Beykpour, CEO of Periscope, and Dick Costolo and Jack Dorsey, former CEOs of Twitter, all shared a common goal—to invent something that would merge both teams into one instead of as partners. It was discontinued in March 2021 due to declining usage, product realignment and high maintenance costs.

==== Mixer ====
Microsoft entered the livestreaming scene when it acquired Beam, the Seattle-based company, in August 2016. About a year after acquiring the company, the service was renamed to Mixer in May 2017. The platform was the first to bring multiple features to livestreaming such as interactive gameplay, where viewers could influence gameplay, and co-streaming, where viewers could watch multiple viewpoints of teammates in the same game. Like Twitch, viewers on Mixer could pay to subscribe to streamers on a monthly basis. Viewers could also buy "Embers", which was the e-currency used by the site, and could donate that to streamers as well. While Twitch remained the biggest company in the business, Mixer attempted to raise its stock by signing multiple big streamers to Mixer-exclusive deals. These signings included Tyler "Ninja" Blevins in August 2019, Michael "Shroud" Grzesiek in October 2019, and Cory "King Gothalion" Michael also in October 2019. Mixer announced it would be shutting down its streaming services on July 22, 2020. In the announcement, Mixer's parent company, Microsoft, announced a partnership with Facebook gaming, and directed current users to the new platform.

== Video games ==
Livestreaming playing of video games gained popularity during the 2010s. David M. Ewalt referred to Twitch as "the ESPN of video games". The website spawned from and grew to overshadow Justin.tv, and was purchased by Amazon.com at the end of 2014 for US$970 million. As one of the leading livestreaming platforms, Twitch now has millions of broadcasters and has nearly two hundred million viewers. Other video-game oriented streaming websites include Smashcast.tv, which was formed after the merging of Azubu and Hitbox.tv, and the South Korea-based afreecaTV. In 2015, YouTube launched YouTube Gaming—a video gaming-oriented sub-site and app that is intended to compete with Twitch.

An example of a notable livestreamed event is Games Done Quick, a charity speedrunning marathon hosted on Twitch. Viewers are encouraged to donate for incentives during the stream such as naming characters in a run, having the runners attempt more difficult challenges, or winning prizes. Over $10 million has been raised across sixteen marathons.

Professional streamers can generate livable revenue from viewer subscriptions and donations, as well as platform advertisements and sponsorships from eSports organizations, often earning much more from streaming than from tournament winnings. The audiences of professional gaming tournaments are primarily livestream viewers in addition to live audiences inside venues. The International 2017, a Dota 2 tournament with the largest prize pool in eSport history, was primarily streamed through Twitch, having a peak of over five million concurrent viewers.

== Sports ==
Within recent years there has been a large influx in viewership and investment into sports live streaming. Digital streaming across Prime Video, NFL Digital, Fox Sports Digital, and Verizon Media Mobile properties in 2019 surpassed an average audience of over 1 million – up 43% versus the previous year (729,000). Additionally, research and forecasts have shown that consumer spending on traditional pay-TV services fell by 8% to $90.7 billion in 2021 and will decline further to $74.5 billion in 2023. It is expected that U.S. household subscription-based services spending will surpass pay TV for the first time in 2024. Large corporations such as Amazon have looked to expand into sports live streaming. In 2021, Amazon closed an 11-year, $113 billion deal to stream National Football League (NFL) games on their Amazon Prime Video Streaming Platform.

Live streaming in sports targets younger viewers with its easy access and subscriptions. The NFL notably partnered with Nickelodeon for youth-focused livestreams of the 2021 Wild Card Playoff Game and beyond. These broadcasts featured Nickelodeon's signature cartoons and commentary from stars Gabrielle Green and Lex Lumpkin.

Despite the growth of live streaming for sports, there are concerns about unauthorised live streaming and piracy of sports content. In January 2021 alone it was said that humans made 362.7 million visits to sports piracy websites. These concerns are exacerbated when studies show over 54% of millennials have watched pirate sports live streams. This has created issues over the future sustainability and protection of legally broadcast streams.

=== Netflix ===
In 2023, Netflix began offering live streaming by adding live events such as sports, concerts, comedy specials, and award shows. As of 2026, it has broadcast over 200 live events. Netflix's live streaming was criticized in 2024 when the live stream for the Jake Paul vs. Mike Tyson fight was marred by glitches and poor quality.

== Metrics ==
With livestreaming becoming a financially viable market, particularly for esports, streamers and organizations representing them have looked for metrics to quantify the viewership of streams as to be able to determine pricing for advertisers. Metrics like maximum number of concurrent viewers, or number of subscribers do not readily account for how long a viewer may stay to watch a stream. The most common metric is the "average minute audience" (AMA), which is obtained by taking the total minutes watched by all viewers on the stream during the streamed event and for 24 hours afterwards, divided by the number of minutes that were broadcast. The AMA is comparable to the same metric that the Nielsen ratings for tracking viewership.

This also makes it possible to combine standard broadcast and streaming routes for events that are simulcasted on both forms of delivery to estimate total audience size Major events with reported AMA include streamed National Football League games; for example, the average AMA for NFL games in 2018 ranged from 240,000 to 500,000 across streaming services, with the following Super Bowl LIV having an AMA of 2.6 million. In comparison, the esports Overwatch League had an average of 313,000 average minute audience during regular season games in its 2019 season.

== Risks in streaming ==
Many instances of serious crimes such as rape and assault, along with suicides, have been streamed live, leaving little to no time for administrators to remove the offending content. Livestreamed crimes became a trend in the mid-2010s with widely reported incidents such as assaults and suicide streamed through Periscope in 2016 and the kidnapping of a man in Chicago streamed through Facebook Live in 2017. A mass shooting in Jacksonville, Florida, resulting in the deaths of two in addition to the shooter, occurred during a Madden NFL 19 tournament. Part of the Christchurch mosque shootings was streamed on Facebook Live by the perpetrator for 17 minutes.

Additionally, livestreaming to large audiences carries the risk that viewers may commit crimes both remotely and in person. Twitch co-founder Justin Kan had been a frequent target of swatting. An incident occurred in April 2017 at the Phoenix Sky Harbor International Airport when a viewer called in a bomb threat and named streamer Ice Poseidon as the culprit, temporarily shutting down the airport. They may also be victim to stalking as with other celebrities; for example, a teenager showed up uninvited to a streamer's house and requested to live with him after having saved up for a one-way transcontinental flight. A Taiwan-based American streamer fell victim to a doxing and targeted harassment campaign by a Taiwanese streamer, coordinated through a private Facebook group with 17,000 members "whose activities involved tracking [his] whereabouts," death threats and "the distribution of his parents’ U.S. phone number and address". Twitch responded by temporarily suspending the harassed streamer.

== Research ==
Live content streaming has been the topic of numerous papers examining ways to cultivate online communities through live interaction and increase attendance numbers with engaging content. The livestreaming platform Twitch is a common focus among researching trying to transfer its user engagement success to other applications such as improving student participation and learning in massive open online courses (MOOCs).

== See also ==
- Streaming television
- Livestreamed news
- National Streaming Day
- Online streamer
- Webcast
