= Socialcam =

Social networking video application

Socialcam was a mobile social video application for iPhone, Android and Windows Phone, that was launched March 7, 2011 and ended October 28, 2015. It allowed users to capture and share videos online and on mobile, as well as via Facebook, Twitter, and other social networks. By July 2012, the application passed 16 million downloads and was acquired by Autodesk for $60 million. Socialcam was founded by Michael Seibel, Ammon Bartram, and Guillaume Luccisano. Its facility was located in San Francisco, California, US.

== Functionality ==
Socialcam was well known for the following functionality: applying filters to video, applying themes and soundtracks to video, and smooth integration with Facebook. Socialcam's eventual goal was to replace the default camera app on all smartphones.

== Investors ==
Socialcam participated in the Winter 2012 class of Y Combinator and raised funding from a large list of Silicon Valley and Hollywood angel investors.

== Brands on Socialcam ==
In 2012, a large number of brands used Socialcam to engage their social media audiences with video content including: Brooklyn Nets, Lipton Iced Tea, New York Jets, Sierra Mist, and General Electric. By the end of 2013, none of these brands were still active on Socialcam. A complete list of Socialcam brands was listed on the site's "brand leaderboard" feature.

== Partnership with the Washington Post ==
On July 9, 2012, the Washington Post announced a partnership with Socialcam, becoming Socialcam's official news partner for the 2012 Summer Olympics in London. Socialcam and the Washington Post worked together to create London Eyes - an interactive map of user generated videos taken in and around London during the olympic games. Socialcam and the Washington Post teamed up again to cover the 2012 Democratic and Republican national conventions to create "Unconventional: Behind the scenes at conventions".

== Criticism ==
Socialcam's popularity on Facebook suddenly increased in the spring of 2012, via unusually aggressive actions to induce contacts to join. It was criticized as "invasive" and a "bully" by many reviewers, for sharing what users were viewing without them realizing that that would happen. This also led to questions about whether Facebook was playing favorites with what content gets featured. In response to criticism, Socialcam quickly made a number of changes to make its sharing functionality easier to understand.

== See also ==
- Keek
