= Justin.tv =

Defunct live-streaming platform (2007-2014)

Justin.tv Inc.
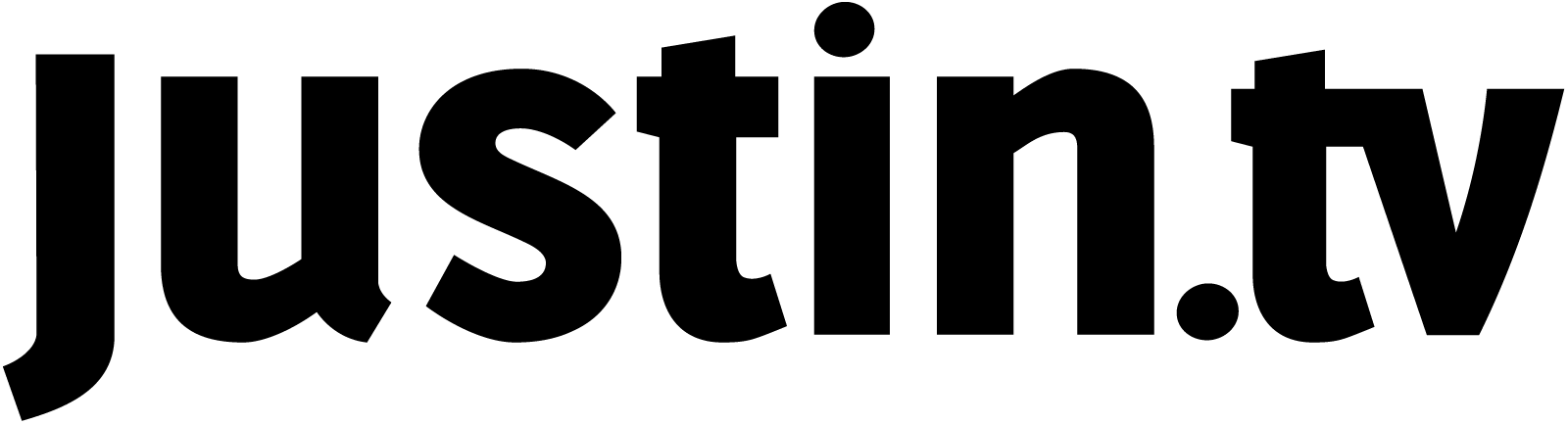
- Website type: Live streaming
- Dissolved: August 5, 2014
- Successor: Twitch.tv
- Owners: Twitch Interactive (called Justin.tv, Inc until February 2014)
- Founders: Justin Kan; Emmett Shear; Michael Seibel; Kyle Vogt
- Website: www.justin.tv (inactive)
- Registration: Optional
- Launched: March 19, 2007; 19 years ago
- Current status: Defunct

Justin.tv was a website created by Justin Kan, Emmett Shear, Michael Seibel, and Kyle Vogt in 2007 to allow anyone to broadcast video online. Justin.tv user accounts were called "channels", like those on YouTube, and users were encouraged to broadcast a wide variety of user-generated live video content, called "broadcasts".

The company was an Internet startup based in San Francisco, California, with seed funding from Paul Graham of seed capital firm Y Combinator and Series A funding with Alsop Louie Partners and Draper Associates.

The original Justin.tv was a single channel featuring founder Justin Kan, who broadcast his life 24/7 and popularized the term lifecasting. In 2007, Justin Kan stopped broadcasting and Justin.tv relaunched into its latter form as a network of thousands of channels.

Users were permitted to broadcast to an unlimited number of people for free, and watching broadcasts did not require user registration. Broadcasts that were considered to contain potentially offensive content were available only to registered users over the age of 18. Broadcasts containing defamation, pornography or copyright violations, or encouraging criminal conduct, were prohibited by Justin.tv's terms of service.

Justin.tv moved its gaming section to a new site called Twitch.tv in June 2011, and the parent company of Twitch.tv and Justin.tv rebranded as Twitch Interactive in February 2014. The Justin.tv services and brand were officially shut down in August 2014 so that the company could focus on Twitch, which was then acquired by Amazon later that month.

== Company history ==
=== Lifecasting origins ===
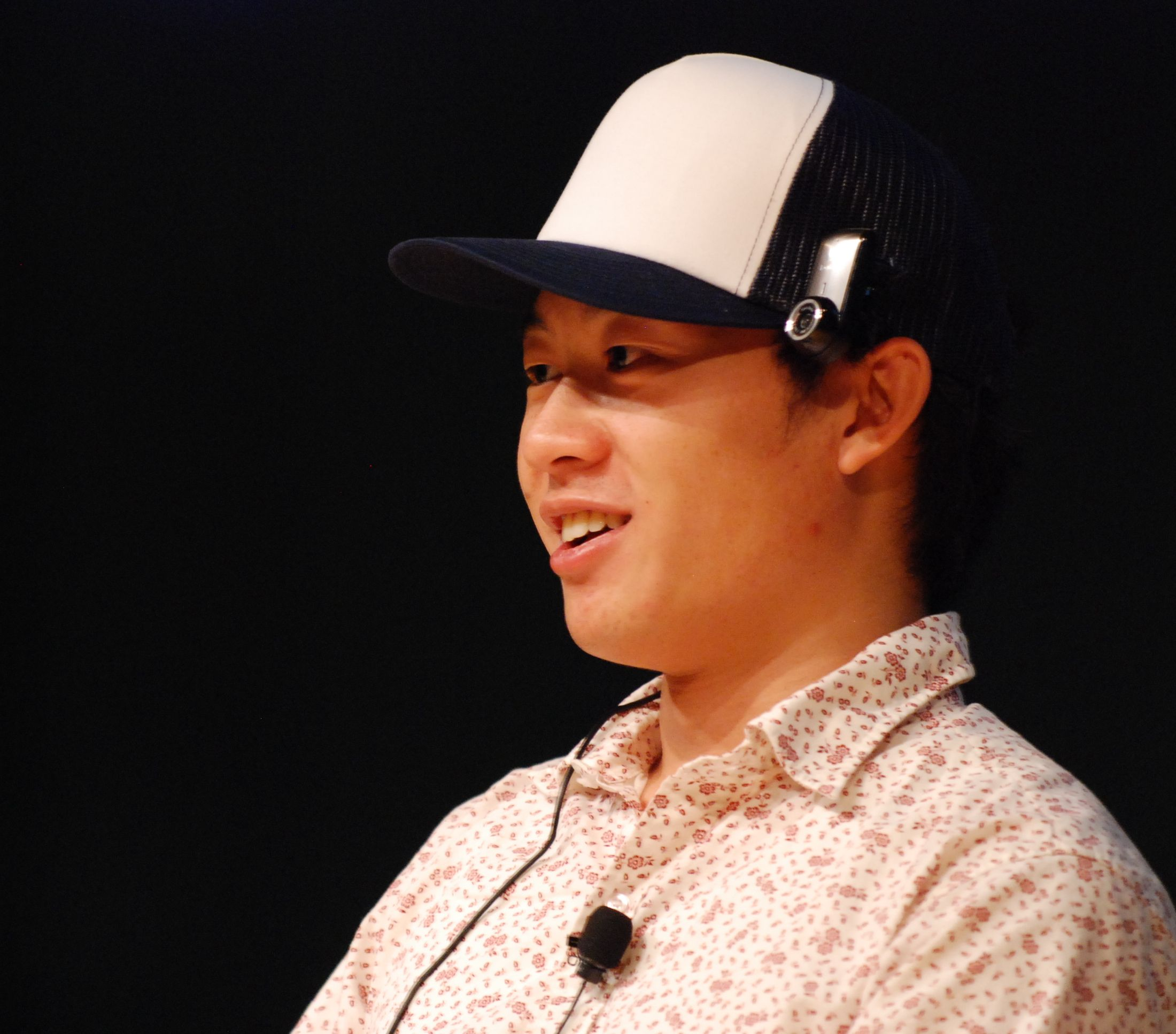
Justin Kan speaking at Gnomedex in 2007

The original Justin.tv was a single channel featuring Justin Kan. Wearing a webcam attached to a baseball cap and streamed online via a laptop-backpack system designed by co-founder Kyle Vogt, Kan decided he would wear the camera 24/7, and he began streaming continuous live video and audio at midnight March 19, 2007. Kan would be streaming his entire life (minus bathroom and bathing breaks) via a camera attached to his hat and a laptop rig created by Justin.tv co-founder, Kyle Vogt. While streaming, Kan interacted with viewers via an inbuilt chat system. Occasionally, viewers would attempt to troll Kan by falsely reporting him to the police ("swatting") or by sending large delivery orders to his apartment, two online harassment methods which remained popular long after the site's closure.

The novelty of the concept attracted media attention, and Kan interviewed with Ann Curry on the Today Show (April 2, 2007), Tom Merritt on the first episode of CNET Live, Nightline (April 6, 2007) and World News Tonight (April 8, 2007). His lifecasting project has been compared to EDtv, Being John Malkovich, and The Truman Show.

Several original lifecasters remain active. Notable figures include iJustine, who continues to make YouTube videos and has over 7 million subscribers; Mooncricket Films, a San Francisco-based lifecaster active since Justin.tv's inception; and JoeInIraq, who uniquely streamed his experiences in Iraq during 2007-2008, offering a rare glimpse into soldiers' downtime in a war zone.

=== Expansion into platform ===
In the summer of 2007, Justin.tv became a platform for more than 60 different channels. The Directory at the top of each channel showed which channels were live and which were not broadcasting. Depending on the entry time, a visitor might have seen only a small selection of the available channels.

By August 2007, channels were being added at an average rate of two a day, with content covering both lifecasters and event streaming. The international locations range from Australia, Brazil, the United Kingdom, and France to the Netherlands and Sweden. In some cases, a lifecaster might travel from one country to another, as was the case when Lisa Batey traveled from Brooklyn to Tokyo and Kyoto in 2007 and 2008. Not all the participants have mobile equipment, however, and most simply transmit an image of themselves sitting at their computer. During this same time frame, singer-songwriter Jody Marie Gnant and others began lifecasting on other websites such as Ustream, Stickam, Livestream, or began lifecasting independent of any major website.

On October 2, 2007, Justin.tv became an open network, allowing members of the public to register and broadcast. By April 10, 2008, Kan stated in an Interview with Tom Merritt that Justin.tv had signed 30,000 broadcasting accounts.

On March 14, 2008, Justin.tv added selectable Categories for broadcasters including: Featured, People & Lifecasting, Sports, Music & Radio, Gaming, News & Tech, Animals, Entertainment, Divas & Dudes. On Friday, June 27, 2008, Justin.tv added networks to the site, in which the user could make their own network with a forum, and officers that would act as moderators for the network. On Thursday, March 25, 2010, these networks were removed from the site. On Monday, October 27, 2008, Justin.tv added Headlines which allows users to make reports on other broadcasters doing interesting things on the site, which then becomes edited and published for all users on the website to read and comment.

For ease of use, a simplified redesign was introduced July 14, 2009. On Monday, April 5, 2010, Justin.tv changed the design of their archive page, renaming them to Past Broadcasts. Essentially, all past broadcasts were saved as a clip, and deleted after 7 days, unless highlighted for permanent save.

In June 2011, Justin.tv separated its "Gaming" section to a new site, called Twitch.tv. On February 10, 2014, Twitch.tv's and Justin.tv's parent company was rebranded as Twitch Interactive.

== Technology ==
Justin.tv's broadcasting and viewing was based on Adobe Flash. Users could broadcast directly from the site, with Justin.tv using Flash to auto-detect and stream from an attached webcam. Justin.tv also supported broadcasting using other third-party software, most notably QuickTime Broadcaster, Camtwist, D3DGear Broadcaster, Flash Media Encoder, Wirecast, FFSplit Broadcaster, XSplit Broadcaster and VLC, to allow broadcasters to add effects or stream higher quality video.

Justin.tv had no default video quality setting; instead, it set bitrate on a case-by-case basis by testing the broadcaster's available bandwidth. The broadcaster could also manually adjust the bitrate before going live. While broadcasting from the browser, the maximum quality settings were 1,000 kbps for video and 44 kHz for audio. In comparison, YouTube High Quality video at the time was 400–500 kbps, and YouTube 720p high definition video is approximately 2,000 kbps. The 1,000 kbps limit could be exceeded by using alternate broadcasting methods, such as Flash Media Encoder and Quicktime Broadcaster, and 720p video in H.264 had been broadcast by some users.

Following the Justin.tv re-design in July 2009, the default channel video size changed from a standard aspect ratio of 468 × 353 pixels to a widescreen 630 × 353 pixels.

== Content accessibility ==
Like YouTube and other static video sites, Justin.tv allowed each channel to be accompanied with an HTML snippet, which allows users to embed video onto pages outside the Justin.tv site. Another snippet is given to embed the associated chatbox as well, thus allowing users to recreate the basic Justin.tv functionality on another page. Broadcasters have the option of disabling embedding for their specific channel.

Following the release of the API in August 2009, Justin.tv released Flash SWF files that allows developers to include Justin.tv video in Flash projects.

== Localization ==
While the primary Justin.tv site was in English, there was support for users to translate the site into other languages. Two languages (Catalan and Spanish) had been translated completely, and an additional 17 were over 50% translated.

== Criticisms ==
Although Justin.tv attempted to align its policies with the Digital Millennium Copyright Act, it had been criticized for failing to ensure that its users respect copyright law. In August 2009, Justin.tv announced a deal with Fox to actively filter streams in real-time. Justin.tv used a filtering system from Vobile to detect and filter out any infringing content, and remove the channel from the website.

During the period when Justin.tv consisted solely of Justin Kan lifecasting, Justin became the target of several pranks. A viewer spoofed Justin's caller ID (publicly available on the site) using an IP Relay service. On March 21, 2007, the spoofer called the San Francisco Police Department and filed a false report about a stabbing in the apartment. The following day, someone reported a fire at the apartment. The San Francisco emergency services then put Justin.tv's number on a list which requires a confirmation call before responding to any emergencies. Kan changed his number and kept the new one private.

In July 2008, TheDefaced.org, a computer security group, released a non-malicious cross-site scripting (XSS) worm onto the Justin.tv site. After successfully propagating the worm, TheDefaced.org contacted Justin.tv programmers and worked with them to fix the vulnerability.

In 2011, the American sports promotion company Zuffa sued Justin.tv for its users using the streaming service to watch pay-per-view matches of the UFC, violating certain trademark and copyright laws. In March 2012, Justin.tv won a partial dismissal of the lawsuit, with the lone exception being in regards to copyright violations. One month later in April, Justin.tv settled with Zuffa for an undisclosed amount and both sides requested the lawsuit be dismissed.

=== Suicide broadcast ===
On November 19, 2008, 19-year-old Abraham K. Biggs died by suicide while broadcasting to a room full of viewers on his Justin.tv channel by ingesting an overdose of opiates and benzodiazepines. He was also struggling with bipolar disorder. Biggs posted his suicide note online, as noted in The New York Times.

The man's father, Abraham Biggs Sr., says those who watched share some blame in his son's death.

Justin.tv CEO Michael Seibel stated,

We regret that this has occurred and respect the privacy of the broadcaster and his family during this time. We have policies in place to discourage the distribution of distressing content and our community monitors the site accordingly. This content was flagged by our community, reviewed and removed according to our terms of service.
