= Edward Jackson (photographer) =

American photographer (1885–1967)

Edward Norman Jackson
- Born: June 28, 1885; Philadelphia, Pennsylvania, United States
- Died: November 11, 1967 (aged 82); Miami, Florida, United States
- Occupations: Photojournalist; Photographer
- Notable credit(s): Official war photographer Presidential photographer
- Website: http://www.edwardnjackson.com/

Edward Norman Jackson (June 28, 1885 – November 11, 1967) was an American photographer and photojournalist for the New York Daily News. Jackson was President Woodrow Wilson's European photographer during the close of World War I and photographed The Big Four world leaders at the Paris Peace Conference.

== Early life ==
The youngest of four siblings of an Irish immigrant family, Jackson was born in Philadelphia on June 28, 1885. His impoverished family would often go to the local soup house to obtain a ticket for a loaf of bread and another ticket for a can of bean soup, his personal journal states. Jackson sold newspapers (Philadelphia Bulletin) on street corners to help his family, where he met a studio photographer who offered him a job after school and Saturdays. He was paid $1.50 a week. The studio specialized in tintype portraitures in 1901. In 1903 the studio moved to Atlantic City and Jackson went with them. Jackson moved to New York City and worked for the American Press Association in the photo engraving department in 1912 where he also became a freelance news photographer.

== News photography ==
Jackson's career as a news photographer began on the streets of New York City where he would provide photographs to many news agencies and magazines throughout the country. Working as a paparazzo, Jackson would stalk his newsworthy subjects throughout the city. The burgeoning use of photography for newspaper stories launched him into this vocation. From his personal journal:

A new field of photography was emerging in 1910; newspapers wanted photographs to replace sketches and drawings for the news events they were going to print. The era of news photography was just beginning and I wanted to become one in the worst way. I never doubted my decision.

"A Good Photograph Is Worth Ten Columns Of Copy." -Edward Jackson - 1961

In 1913 Jackson accepted his first foreign freelance assignment and steamed to Panama aboard the Prince August William to photograph the Panama Canal before its official opening in 1914. In 1915 Jackson was invited by his friend Thomas Alva Edison, newly appointed as President of the Naval Reserve Board, to document the inspection of a highly secret United States submarine "E-2" in the Brooklyn Navy yard. The United States had not entered World War I and did not want the warring nations to know about the development of submarine capability. Two weeks later the submarine mysteriously exploded, killing several personnel. Jackson's forbidden photograph of the damaged submarine appeared in all of the New York papers.

== World War I ==
Many years past the draft age, Jackson joined the Army Signal Corps (reserves) at the age of 32 and reported for training at Camp Alfred Vail in Little Silver, New Jersey on October 22, 1917. Due to his extensive photographic experience he was promoted to 1st Lieutenant and was assigned the title of Official War Photographer. Several months later he was selected to be President Woodrow Wilson's official photographer.

Jackson spent nearly a year on the battlefront in France and received several military commendations. He was given a battlefield promotion to Captain of the twenty-seventh division of the Army Signal Corps, and assigned directly to President Wilson's European peace entourage. His photograph of "The Big Four" taken in Paris on May 27, 1919, showed the leaders of the free world: British Prime Minister David Lloyd George, Italian Premier Vittorio Orlando, French Prime Minister Georges Clemenceau, and US President Woodrow Wilson.

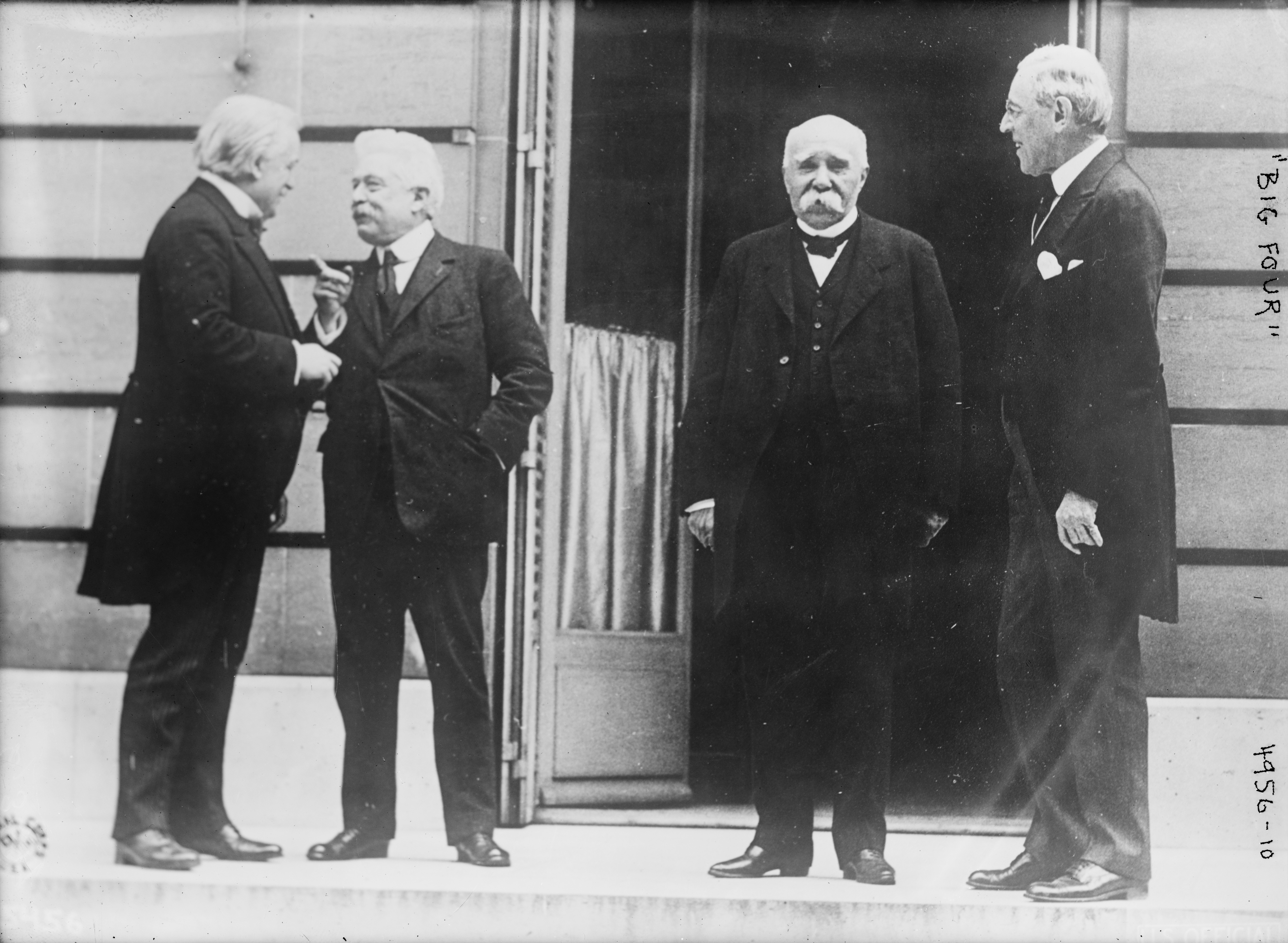
WWI Peace conference, Paris, May 27, 1919. Photo of free world leaders.

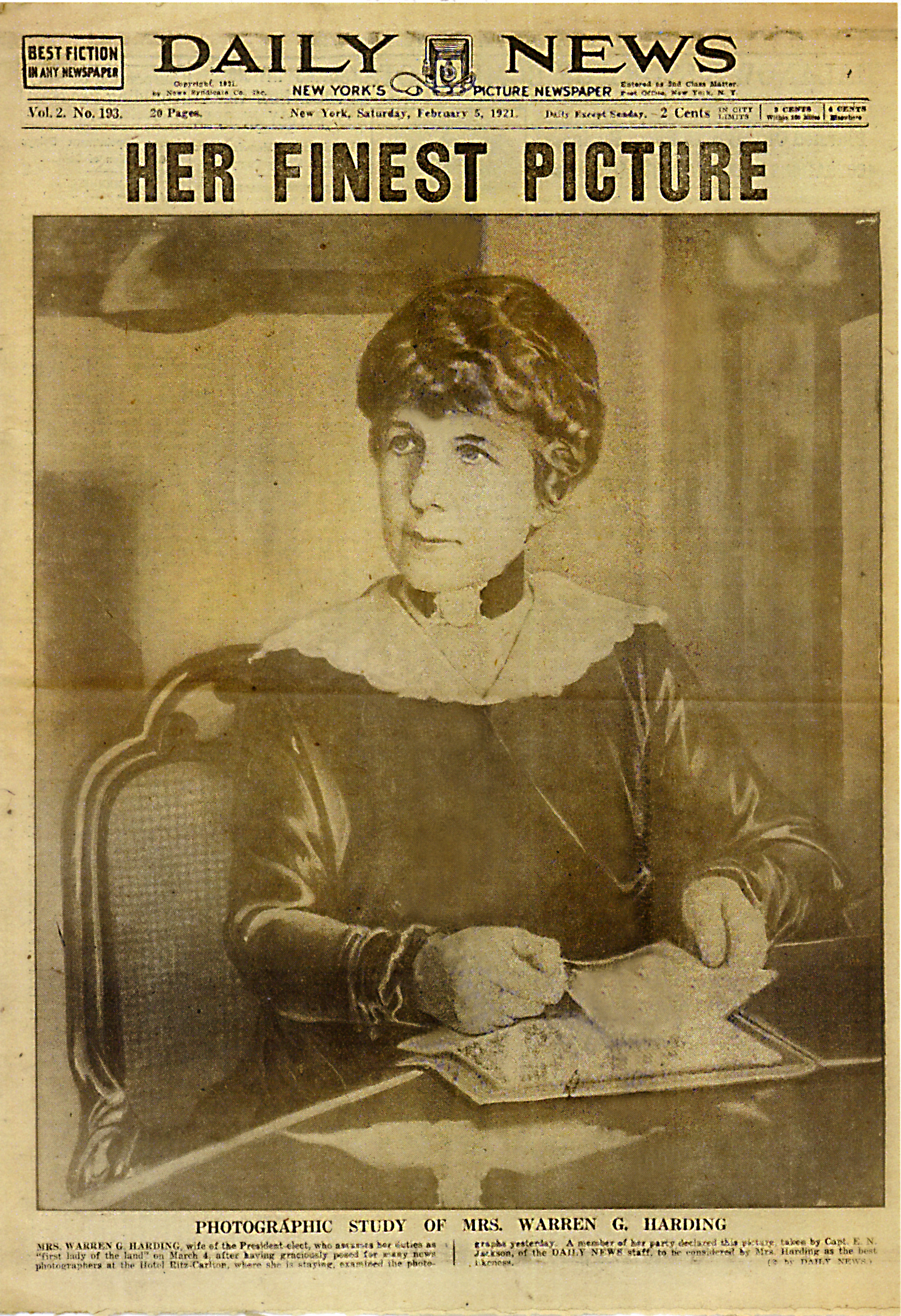
"A photographer's photographer" quote by First Lady Mrs. Warren G. Harding who stated the Edward Jackson's photograph of her was "the best photo ever taken." The photo ran on the entire front page of the February 5, 1921 New York Daily News.

== Post-war years ==
Returning from France a seasoned, recognized professional news photographer, Jackson was offered many employment offers. He decided to work with Joseph Mendill Patterson and his cousin Robert R. McCormick, who were co-publishers of the Chicago Tribune and wanted to start a New York tabloid newspaper, The New York Daily News. Launched on June 26, 1919, with Edward N. Jackson as their lead photographer, the publishers wanted large and prominent photographs of city news, entertainment and sports events and local city coverage, all of which was assigned to Jackson. The New York Daily News is today the sixth largest newspaper in the country and has won ten Pulitzer prizes.

In 1927 William Randolph Hearst wanted to promote his newspaper the New York Daily Mirror by sponsoring a non-stop historic flight from New York to Rome following Charles Lindbergh's successful flight from New York to Paris (May 20–21, 1927). The aircraft—Old Glory—a German Fokker F.VII, was to be manned by pilots Lloyd W. Bertaud and James DeWitt Hill and the Daily Mirror managing editor Phillip A. Payne, a close friend of Jackson's, flying with them for one-on-one news coverage. The historic flight left Old Orchard Beach, Maine on the morning of September 6, 1927. Sixteen hours into the flight a SOS was received and the aircraft was never heard from again. Jackson reportedly took the last known photograph of Old Glory on August 26, 1927, for his friend. It was never published.

Another historic flight that Jackson covered was the flight of the Bremen, a German Junkers W-33 aircraft crewed by Baron Gunther von Hünefeld, Hermann Köhl and James C. Fitzmaurice in April, 1928. The planned east to west Atlantic Ocean crossing took flight on Thursday, April 12, 1928, from Baldonnel, Ireland, with a destination at Mitchel Field, New York, where Jackson waited for their arrival. Thirty-six hours after Bremen left Ireland, it was forced to crash-land on Greenly Island in Canada. Jackson immediately left for Canada and hired a single-engine aircraft to fly him and other news reporters to Greenly Island to cover the story. While none of the flight crew were injured as a result of the accident, famed aviator Floyd Bennett became ill and died while attempting to salvage the Bremen from Greenly Island.

== The Great Depression ==
Edward Jackson personally covered "Black Thursday," October 24, 1929 when Wall Street experienced the beginnings of the famed stock market crash leading to the infamous "Black Tuesday" on October 29, 1929 – the beginnings of the Great Depression. Jackson's camera captured much of this tragedy over the next ten years. The worst and longest economic collapse in history, the depression spread to most of the world's industrialized countries like a firestorm. Businesses and banks closed their doors. Millions of jobs were lost, leaving many without homes, savings or even food. Jackson documented on film, this national tragedy.

== Later life ==
Edward Jackson remained with The New York Daily News until his retirement in 1958 at 73. His only child, Edith May Jackson, gave Eddie three grandchildren; Noreen, John and Barry Fitzgerald who often visited him at his home in Wilton, Connecticut. Jackson died from natural causes at 82.
