= Freedom of the City of Dublin =

Honour bestowed by the City of Dublin

The Freedom of the City of Dublin is awarded by Dublin City Council after approving a person nominated by the Lord Mayor. Eighty-two people have been honoured under the current process introduced in 1876. Most honourees have made a contribution to the life of the city or of Ireland in general, including politicians, public servants, humanitarians, artists and entertainers; others were distinguished members of the Irish diaspora and foreign leaders, honoured visiting Dublin. Honourees sign the roll of freedmen in a ceremony at City Hall or the Mansion House and are presented with an illuminated scroll by the Lord Mayor.

== Ancient privileges and duties ==
In ancient boroughs such as Dublin, a royal charter established the privileges of the "burgesses" (or "citizens" in places like Dublin with city status). Admission as a freeman or citizen was principally granted to members of the Guilds of the City of Dublin and others by "special grace", as well as by marriage or descent from existing citizens. The wealthy could buy freedom by paying a "fine", and some of the penal laws facilitated Protestant immigrants' becoming freemen.

Ancient charters were superseded for municipal governance purposes by the Municipal Corporations (Ireland) Act 1840 and for all other non-ceremonial purposes by the Local Government Act 2001. Nevertheless, ancient privileges and duties of freemen are sometimes cited in relation to the modern award. Rights included:

- Exemption from octroi charged on goods brought through the city gates.
- Pasturage of sheep on city commons, which included College Green and St Stephen's Green. This right was exercised as a publicity stunt by U2 members the day after their 2000 conferring.
- The right to vote in municipal elections, and in the Irish parliamentary borough of Dublin (after the Acts of Union 1800 in the UK parliamentary borough of Dublin).

Freedmen had a duty to defend the city and could be called into the militia at short notice. In 1454, apprentices to be admitted freemen needed a bow and sword, while merchants additionally needed a coat of mail and helmet.

== Honorary Freedom ==
While the Representation of the People Act 1918 abolished the franchise rights of freemen, the Municipal Privileges Ireland Act 1876 allowed the establishment of the title of "Honorary Freemen". This was retained by Local Government Act 1991 and currently the Local Government Act 2001.

Recipients of the Freedom of Dublin since the Municipal Privileges Ireland Act 1876
No. (Note: The missing numbers 40 to 43 correspond to the four earlier non-numeric values, inserted for those who signed the roll late or never. Since 1955, numbering is from resolution rather than signature.)	Name	Resolution	Signature	Country (Note: Those associated with Dublin in particular are noted)	Field	Notes
1	Isaac Butt	4 September 1876	16 October 1876	Ireland	Politics	
2	William Ewart Gladstone	1 November 1877	7 November 1877	England	Politics	
3	Ulysses S. Grant	30 December 1878	3 January 1879	United States	Politics / Military	Former President and General in the Union Army
4	Edward Eells Potter	26 April 1880	4 May 1880	United States	Diplomacy / Military	United States Navy Commander; captained the USS Constellation carrying relief aid for the 1879 Irish famine.
5	Charles Stewart Parnell	3 January 1882	16 August 1882	Ireland	Politics	
6	John Dillon	3 January 1882	16 August 1882	Ireland	Politics	
7	Kevin Izod O'Doherty	10 August 1885	1 September 1885	Ireland / Australia	Politics	Had just returned from Australia to contest North Meath in the November general election.
8	Patrick A. Collins	22 July 1887	2 August 1887	United States	Politics	
9	William O'Brien	22 July 1887	2 August 1887	Ireland	Politics	
9a	Timothy Daniel Sullivan	10 December 1887	24 October 1893	Ireland	Politics	
9b	Thomas Sexton	28 December 1887	Did not sign roll	Ireland	Politics	
10	George Robinson, 1st Marquess of Ripon	16 January 1888	2 February 1888	England	Politics	For supporting the First Home Rule Bill
11	John Morley	16 January 1888	2 February 1888	England	Politics	For supporting the First Home Rule Bill as Chief Secretary for Ireland
12	Patrick F. Moran	1 October 1888	4 October 1888	Ireland / Australia	Religion: Catholic	Cardinal, Archbishop of Sydney
13	Margaret Sandhurst	19 September 1889	20 September 1889	England	Activism / Politics	Suffragist who had just had her election to London County Council overturned.
14	James Stansfeld	19 September 1889	20 September 1889	England	Politics / Activism	Radical MP and suffragist
15	George Salmon	14 March 1892	30 June 1892	Ireland	Education / Religion: Church of Ireland	Provost of Trinity College Dublin during its tercentenary
16	Stuart Knill	23 December 1892	2 January 1893	England	Politics	Then Lord Mayor of London. of the Knill baronets.
17	John Redmond	18 December 1901	3 April 1902	Ireland	Politics	
18	P. A. McHugh	30 October 1901	3 April 1902	Ireland	Politics	
19	Douglas Hyde	29 June 1906	7 August 1906	Ireland	Culture: Irish language	Under his pen name An Craoibhín Aoibhín
20	Emanuel Spencer Harty	2 September 1907	Did not sign roll	Ireland	Public service: civil engineering	Dublin City Engineer
20a	Hugh Lane	10 February 1908	Did not sign roll	Ireland (Dublin) / England	Culture: art : collector	Had established the Municipal Gallery of Modern Art
21	Richard Croker	1 July 1907	24 August 1908	United States	Politics	Tammany Hall boss
22	Edward O'Meagher Condon	28 September 1909	4 October 1909	Ireland	Activism	Co-accused of the Manchester Martyrs
23	Charles Cameron	30 September 1910	20 February 1911	Ireland (Dublin)	Public service: medicine	
24	Kuno Meyer	18 July 1911	22 April 1912	Germany	Culture: Irish language	Expunged 15 March 1915 due to anti-German feeling in World War I; restored 19 April 1920.
25	Peadar Ua Laoghaire	18 July 1911	22 April 1912	Ireland	Culture: Irish language	Priest
25a	Daniel Mannix	5 August 1920	Did not sign roll	Australia / Ireland	Religion: Catholic	Archbishop of Melbourne
26	John McCormack	3 September 1923	6 September 1923	Ireland / United States	Culture: music	
27	Ehrenfried Günther Freiherr von Hünefeld	30 June 1928	3 July 1928	Germany	Aviation	Bremen transatlantic aircraft owner
28	Hermann Köhl	30 June 1928	3 July 1928	Germany	Aviation	Bremen transatlantic aircraft pilot
29	James Fitzmaurice	30 June 1928	3 July 1928	United States	Aviation	Bremen transatlantic aircraft navigator
30	Frank B. Kellogg	25 August 1928	30 August 1928	United States	Politics / Diplomacy	United States Secretary of State who had recently instigated the Kellogg–Briand Pact
31	Lorenzo Lauri	2 May 1932	27 June 1932	Italy	Religion: Catholic	Cardinal, papal legate during 1932 Eucharistic Congress in Dublin
32	John Lavery	12 August 1935	17 September 1935	Ireland / England	Culture: art : painter	
33	John Purser Griffith	4 May 1936	8 June 1936	Ireland	Public service: civil engineering	
34	George Bernard Shaw	4 March 1946	28 August 1946	Ireland / England	Culture: literature / drama	
35	Richard Cushing	16 September 1949	16 September 1949	United States	Religion: Catholic	Cardinal, Archbishop of Boston
36	Paul A. Dever	16 September 1949	16 September 1949	United States	Politics	Governor of Massachusetts
37	Seán T. O'Kelly	4 May 1953	2 June 1953	Ireland	Diplomacy	Then President of Ireland
38	John D'Alton	4 May 1953	2 June 1953	Ireland	Religion: Catholic	Cardinal Archbishop of Armagh
39	Gerald O'Hara	12 July 1954	27 July 1954	United States	Religion: Catholic	Apostolic Nuncio to Ireland
44	Chester Beatty	7 November 1955	26 July 1956	United States / Ireland (Dublin)	Culture: art : collector	
45	John Norton (bishop)	11 August 1958	28 October 1958	Australia	Religion: Catholic	Bishop of Bathurst
46	Grégoire-Pierre Agagianian	1 May 1961	22 June 1961	Armenia	Religion: Catholic: Armenian	Cardinal, papal legate for the Patrician Year Congress held at Croke Park.
47	Michael Browne	16 July 1962	23 August 1962	Ireland	Religion: Catholic	Cardinal, former Master General of the Dominican Order; received freedom of Limerick and Drogheda on the same trip to Ireland.
48	John F. Kennedy	27 May 1963	28 June 1963	United States	Politics / Diplomacy	During state visit to Ireland
49	Hilton Edwards	11 June 1973	22 June 1973	England / Ireland (Dublin)	Culture: drama	Co-founder of the Gate Theatre
50	Micheál Mac Liammóir	11 June 1973	22 June 1973	England / Ireland (Dublin)	Culture: drama	Co-founder of the Gate Theatre
51	Éamon de Valera	3 February 1975	7 March 1975	Ireland	Politics / Diplomacy	Former Taoiseach and President
52	John A. Costello	3 February 1975	7 March 1975	Ireland (Dublin)	Politics	Former Taoiseach, alternately with de Valera
53	Pope John Paul II	24 September 1979	29 September 1979	Poland / Vatican	Religion: Catholic / Diplomacy	During official visit
54	Noel Purcell	22 June 1984	28 June 1984	Ireland (Dublin)	Culture: drama	Actor
55	Maureen Potter	22 June 1984	28 June 1984	Ireland (Dublin)	Culture: drama	Actress
56	Akihito	20 February 1985	4 March 1985	Japan	Diplomacy	Then Crown Prince, during official visit
57	Michiko	20 February 1985	4 March 1985	Japan	Diplomacy	Then Crown Princess, during official visit
58	Stephen Roche	28 September 1987	29 September 1987	Ireland (Dublin)	Sport: cycling	After winning 1987 Tour de France
59	Nelson Mandela	18 July 1988	1 July 1990	South Africa	Activism	Awarded on 70th birthday, while in prison; enrolled by proxy by Oliver Tambo on 21 September 1988; signed in person after his release.
60	Patrick Hillery	4 March 1991	22 April 1991	Ireland	Diplomacy	Former President of Ireland
61	Mother Teresa of Calcutta	1 February 1993	2 June 1993	Albania / India	Religion: Catholic / Activism	
62	Jack Charlton	11 April 1994	26 May 1994	England	Sport: soccer	Then manager of the Republic of Ireland national team
63	Bill Clinton	6 November 1995	1 December 1995	United States	Politics / Diplomacy	During official visit during the Northern Ireland peace process
64	Gay Byrne	12 April 1999	11 May 1999	Ireland (Dublin)	Culture: broadcasting	
65	Aung San Suu Kyi	1 November 1999	18 June 2012	Burma	Activism	Granted in 1999 while she was under house arrest, Suu Kyi signed for her award in 2012 during a visit to Ireland. The Council voted 59–2 (with one abstention) to revoke her award on 13 December 2017 over human rights abuses against the Rohingya people in Myanmar.
66	Paul McGuinness	1 November 1999	18 March 2000	Ireland (Dublin)	Culture: music	U2 manager
67	The Edge	1 November 1999	18 March 2000	Ireland (Dublin) / Wales	Culture: music	U2 member
68	Larry Mullen Jr.	1 November 1999	18 March 2000	Ireland (Dublin)	Culture: music	U2 member
69	Adam Clayton	1 November 1999	18 March 2000	Ireland (Dublin) / England	Culture: music	U2 member
70	Bono	1 November 1999	18 March 2000	Ireland (Dublin)	Culture: music	U2 member
71	Mikhail Gorbachev	3 December 2001	9 January 2002	Russia	Politics / Diplomacy / Activism	
72	Kevin Heffernan	1 March 2004	17 May 2004	Ireland (Dublin)	Sport: Gaelic football	Player and manager of the Dublin intercounty team
73	Ronnie Delany	5 September 2005	5 March 2006	Ireland (Dublin)	Sport: athletics	Won the 1956 Olympic 1500 m
74	Bob Geldof	5 September 2005	5 March 2006	Ireland (Dublin)	Activist / Culture: music	Live Aid organiser and Boomtown Rats lead singer Geldof returned his award in November 2017 in protest over Myanmar leader Aung San Suu Kyi also holding the accolade, stating that he does not "wish to be associated in any way with an individual currently engaged in the mass ethnic cleansing of the Rohingya people of north-west Burma". Suu Kyi's award was revoked by the Council about a month later, though Lord Mayor Mícheál Mac Donncha denied the decision was influenced by protests by Geldof and members of U2. At the same meeting, the Councillors voted 37–7 (with 5 abstentions) to remove Geldof's name from the Roll of Honorary Freemen.
75	Thomas Kinsella	5 February 2007	24 May 2007	Ireland (Dublin)	Culture: literature : poetry	
76	Louis le Brocquy	5 February 2007	24 May 2007	Ireland (Dublin)	Culture: art : painter	
77	Peter McVerry	4 November 2013	22 March 2014	Ireland (Dublin)	Activism / Religion: Catholic	Jesuit homeless campaigner
78	Brian O'Driscoll	4 November 2013	22 March 2014	Ireland (Dublin)	Sport: rugby union	Captain of the Ireland national team
79	Kevin Crowley	1 September 2014	28 February 2015	Ireland (Dublin)	Activism / Religion: Catholic	Capuchin homeless campaigner
80	Johnny Giles	1 September 2014	28 February 2015	Ireland (Dublin)	Sport: soccer	Former captain and manager of the Republic of Ireland national team
81	Barack Obama; Michelle Obama	7 February 2017	25 September 2025	United States	Politics	Former President of the United States of America; for "moderating and progressive" influence on the world stage. Former First Lady of the United States of America; for work for the education of girls around the world and on behalf of refugees.
82	Jim Gavin	23 September 2019	18 January 2020	Ireland (Dublin)	Sport: Gaelic football	Football manager of the senior Dublin county team from 2012 to 2019, becoming the county's most successful manager in terms of major titles won.
83	Tony Holohan	6 July 2020	19 June 2021	Ireland (Dublin)	Public service: medicine	Chief Medical Officer, conferred on behalf of all healthcare workers to recognise their efforts during the COVID-19 pandemic.
84	Kellie Harrington; Ailbhe Smyth; Mary Aiken (psychologist)	9 May 2022	11 June 2022	Ireland (Dublin)	Sport / Activism / Public service	Harrington for her community work and sporting achievements; Smyth for her work in the areas of human rights, social justice and academia; Aiken for her work in the areas of cyberpsychology, online safety and security.
85	Greta Thunberg Duncan Stewart	12 June 2023	21 June 2023	Sweden (Stockholm) Ireland (Dublin)	Environmental activism	For environmental activism and climate change awareness.

== Sources ==
- Clark, Mary (Spring 2000). "Freedom of the City of Dublin". Dublin Historical Record. 53 (1): 33–37. JSTOR 30101245.
