= P. A. Ó Síocháin =

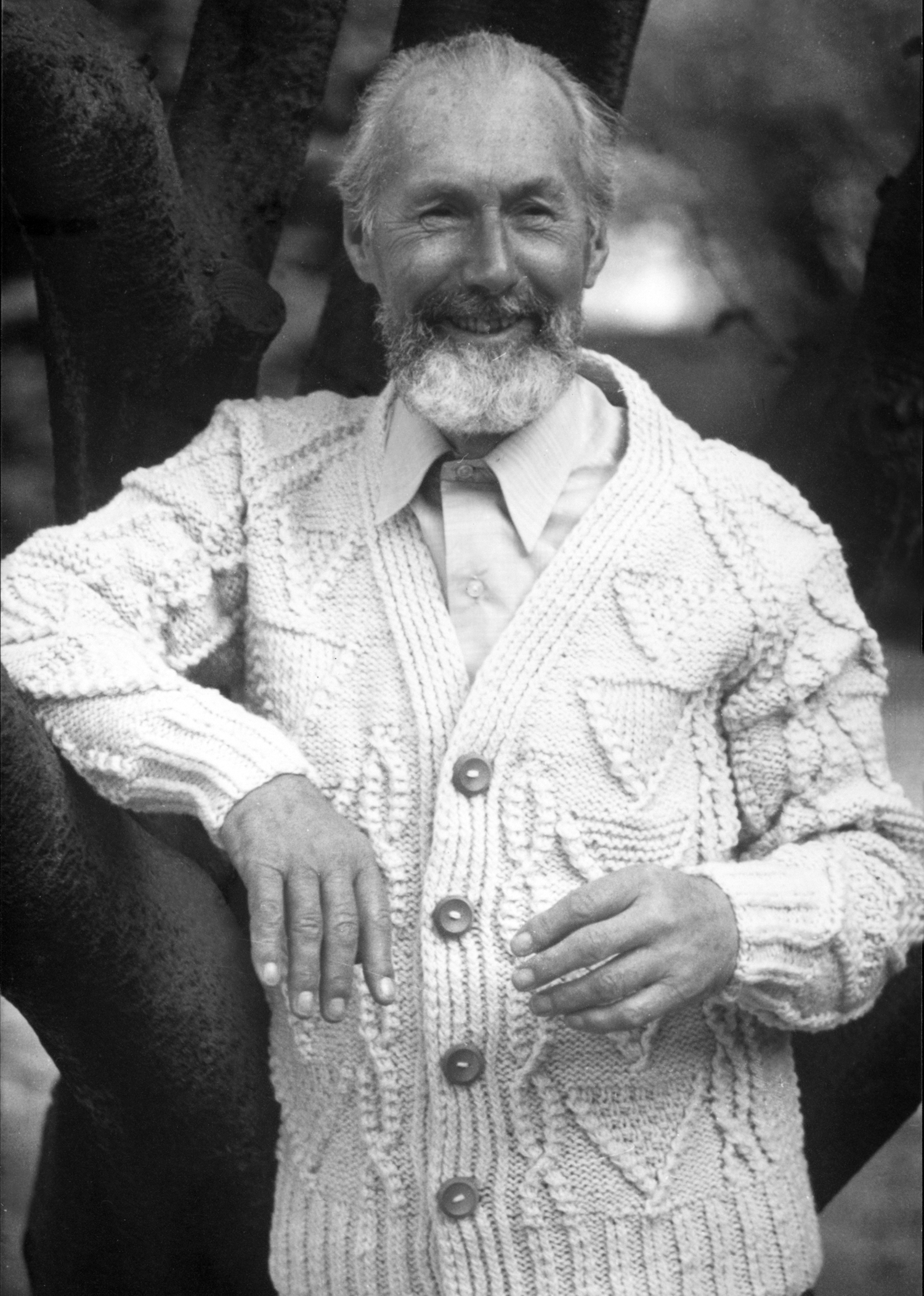
P. A. Ó Siocháin in 1985, age 80, modelling one of his Aran cardigans.

Pádraig Augustine Ó Síocháin (P. A.) (1905–1995) was an Irish journalist, author, lawyer, Irish language activist and entrepreneur, born in Kanturk, County Cork, Ireland on 26 May 1905, the sixth child of D. D. Sheehan, MP for Mid Cork, of Kanturk, and Mary Pauline (née O'Connor) from Tralee, County Kerry.

== Journalism ==
He was educated at Kanturk National school, Rochestown College, Cork, and the University of London, receiving a diploma in journalism in 1923. Appointed junior reporter for the Daily Sketch in London in 1924, he returned to Ireland later that year as junior editor of the Enniscorthy Echo, County Wexford.

Moving to Dublin, from 1927 to 1931 he was a reporter, political and aviation correspondent for The Irish Times, reporting exclusively on the first non-stop east–west transatlantic flight in 1928 by an aeroplane, the Bremen, a German Junkers W33 type aircraft, from Baldonnel Airfield, County Dublin.

He was one of the founder members of The Irish Press in 1931, for which he worked as political correspondent for some years. As member of the National Union of Journalists he served many years on the 'Newspaper Conciliation Board' as trade union representative. He was responsible for securing the agreement settling the hours and wages for journalists in the Irish national press.

== Editor ==
During the 1930s he was editor of the Irish Aviation Magazine – the national air magazine of Ireland and the New Irish Magazine. Then from 1931 editor of the Garda Review, the official journal of the Garda Síochána, Ireland's national police service, which he edited for 41 years in accordance with General Eoin O'Duffy's instructions to edit it strictly in the interest of the service members. The Garda Review followed its own independent line. With it the Garda force had a vibrant and successful journal, interesting and entertaining for the vast majority of the force, which helped to keep those in remote areas involved. It was highly professional in layout and literary standards, providing a medium for conveying the views of the government and the commissioner to the force. At the same time it allowed the Gardaí voice their suggestions or grievances.

== War Emergency ==
During the war emergency (1939–1946) he served as Local Defence Force (LDF) area company leader and on the district HQ staff, as well as initiating and directing a parish council movement for the distribution of 10,000 tons of turf peat fuel and 750 tons of timber supplies from the Dublin and Wicklow Mountains to south Dublin homes during the war rationing period on a unique share system.

== Lawyer ==
Beginning law studies in 1933, he qualified as barrister-at-law at King's Inns Dublin on 2 November 1936. He was called to the Inner Law Bar as Senior Counsel on 2 March 1948, practising extensively at the Four Courts, Dublin, specialising in trade union law, acting as legal adviser for 20 years to the Marine Port and General Worker's Union. He was also recognised as an authority on Criminal Law and Constitutional Law. He published as author several legal books also officially in the Irish Language, the first since the ancient Brehon Laws.

== Language activist ==
Early in 1948, he changed the family name from Sheehan to the modern Gaelic version of Ó Síocháin. In the 1950s he recognised the need for himself to understand his native country at a deeper level, so becoming involved with the Aran Islands where he perfected his spoken Irish to the fluency of a native speaker and gained immense respect from the islanders.

He was founder of the National Language Revival Movement and president of CARA, Society of Friends to promote the spoken use of the Irish language, and established an Irish language school in Dublin, also using learning recording systems. Always wearing the Fáinne Óir, he insisted on being spoken to only in Irish wherever he went.

He was fervently against the compulsory requirements of taking Irish in schools, feeling that the language could best be promoted through enthusiasm and self-desire.

== Aran Islands engagement ==
P. A. Ó Siocháin SC presenting his book on the Aran Islands to President John F. Kennedy at an Áras an Uachtaráin reception for Irish Exporter's during the President's official visit to Ireland in July 1962.

In 1952, he acquired a company, Galway Bay Products Ltd., from a Dublin client Norman Baillie-Stewart, to develop, market and export hand-knitted Aran Islands's knitwear, pioneering in the later 1950s and early 1960s the big sales boom of Aran sweaters and cardigans to the United States and Canada, later adding a similar range of County Wexford Loch Garman handknits, expanding his markets further in the 1970s to include Europe, Australia, and, significantly, Japan. His sales brochures and book on the Aran Isles were illustrated by the Irish artist Seán Keating.

During those decades he recorded in detailed documentary films the life and traditions on the islands. Elsewhere he furthered the fishing industry by providing two modern fishing trawlers in the 1970s under his company Shannon Atlantic Fisheries Ltd.

== Politics ==
He was a member of Fianna Fáil from the early 1930s, having been County Dublin's Fianna Fáil director at the 1948 general election achieving one of their best returns, but abandoning them in 1952 due to their lack of interest in furthering the Irish language.

During the 1960s, he turned his attention again to politics, becoming involved in the Labour movement, standing as an unsuccessful Labour party candidate at the 1965 general election for the Clare constituency, polling 2.362 1st preferences, or 6.9%.

== Other activities ==
He wrote numerous books, on history, law, as well as diverse newspaper articles. He was presiding president of the PEN Club of Ireland in 1956. He became an excellent low handicap golfer, winning many local tournaments, was a year-round Dalkey-Forty-foot swimmer and qualified to pilot aircraft out of Weston Airfield and gliders out of Baldonnel. In the early 1930s as members of the Dublin and District Motor Club, he as navigator, his wife Marjorie as driver, won many road rally trophies.

== Family and works ==
In 1931 he married Marjorie Ann Griffin with whom he had five children, four sons and a daughter. They lived at Rathfarnham, Dublin, where he died in his family home on 19 December 1995, aged 90 and is buried at Cruagh Cemetery, South Dublin.

His wife, renowned for her greyhound racing, coursing and breeding, predeceased him in 1984.

- Personal Publications:
  - Outline of Evidence: Practice and Procedure, Foilsiúcháin Éireann, Sráid Grafton, Duibhlinn 2; Kells Publishing Co. (1953) (2nd Edition 1962)
  - Dlí na Fianaise in Éirinn, An Chéad Eagrán (1953), an Dara hEagrán (2nd Ed) (1962)
  - The Criminal Law of Ireland, Foilsiúcháin Éireann, Sráid Grafton, Duibhlinn 2; Kells Publishing Co. (8th Edition 1988)
  - Dlí Coiriúil na h-Éireann, an 4ú hEagrán, i nGaeilge (1964)
  - Aran Islands of Legend , Foilsiúcháin Éireann, Sráid Grafton, Duibhlinn 2; Kells Publishing Co.(1962), USA ed. Devin Adair, New York (1963), (3rd Edition 1967)
  - Ireland: A journey into lost time, Foilsiúcháin Éireann, Sráid Grafton, Duibhlinn 2 (1983)
  - Ireland: Journey to freedom, Foilsiúcháin Éireann, Sráid Grafton, Duibhlinn 2; Kells Publishing Co. (1990) ISBN 1-872490-02-6

=== References ===
- McQuillan, Deirdre: The Aran Sweater, The Appletree Press Ltd., Belfast (1993) ISBN 0-86281-391-3
- Obituary, retrieved from The Irish Times 21 December 1995
- Ó Síocháin, Ruarí: Aran Islands – A Journey through changing times,
  (Video/DVD 2003) (see Available from Burren Smoke House (external link)).
- Cronin, Maurice & Lunney, Linde in: McGuire, James and Quinn, James (eds): Dictionary of Irish Biography From the Earliest Times to the Year 2002;
  Royal Irish Academy Vol. 7 p. 950; Cambridge University Press (2009) ISBN 978-0-521-19981-0
- Cadogan, Tim & Falvey, Jeremiah: A Biographical Dictionary of Cork p. 271, Four Courts Press (2006), ISBN 1-84682-030-8
