= Bremen (aircraft) =

Historic German Junkers W 33 aircraft

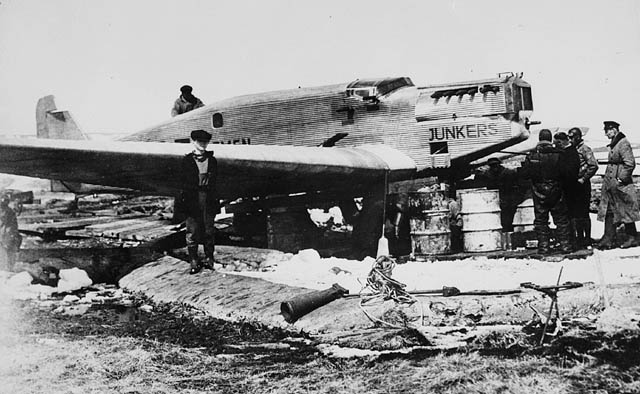
- Bremen after the transatlantic crossing

General information
- Type: Junkers W 33
- Construction number: 2504
- Registration: D-1167

History
- Preserved at: Bremen Airport Museum
- Fate: Preserved

The Bremen is a German Junkers W 33 aircraft that made the first successful transatlantic aeroplane flight from east to west on April 12 and 13, 1928.

After weather delays lasting 17 days, the Bremen left Baldonnel Aerodrome, Ireland, on April 12 with a three man crew, arriving at Greenly Island, Canada, on April 13, after a flight fraught with difficult conditions and compass problems.

Owner Ehrenfried Günther Freiherr von Hünefeld, a wealthy German aristocrat, and pilot Captain Hermann Köhl had made an all-German attempt at the feat in 1927, but had to abandon it due to bad weather. For this new attempt, they were joined by a third crewman, Irish navigator Major James Fitzmaurice. Fitzmaurice had also previously attempted the crossing, as co-pilot of the Princess Xenia (aircraft) with Robert Henry McIntosh, but they had to abandon the attempt due to high headwinds in September 1927.

== Flight log ==
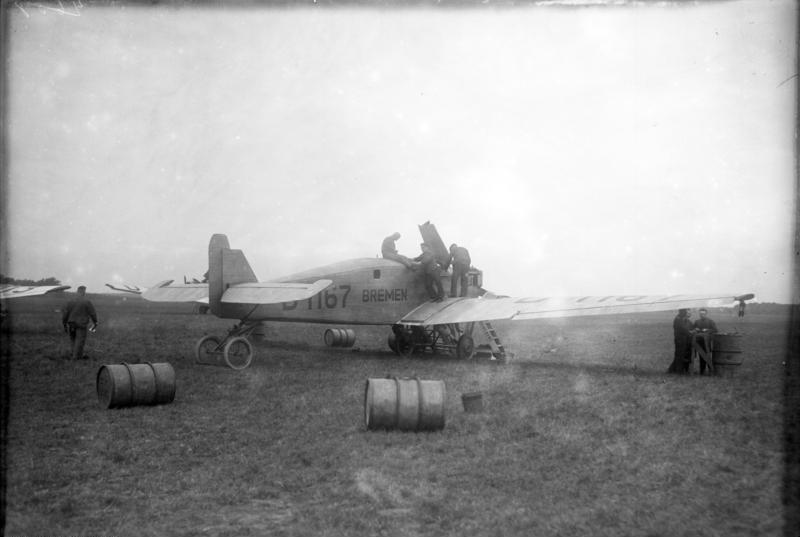
The Bremen in Baldonnel getting ready for take-off

- 12 Apr, 05:09 GMT: Started engine of the Bremen at Baldonnel Aerodrome (about 19 km (12 mi) southwest of Dublin).
- 12 Apr, 05:38 GMT: Lifted off from Baldonnel Airport and headed west.
- 12 Apr, 07:05 GMT: The Bremen passed the Slyne Head Lighthouse in County Galway, started across the Atlantic, and headed for Mitchel Field, Long Island, New York while maintaining an altitude of 1,500 feet (460 m) and an airspeed of 200 kilometres per hour (120 mph)
- 12 Apr, 09:00 GMT: The crew started their first meal aloft: hot bouillon and sandwiches.
- 12 Apr, 13:45 GMT: Bremen crossed the 30th meridian west. Surface speed was over 90 knots (170 km/h; 100 mph).
- 12 Apr, 16:00 GMT: Bremen climbed to 610 m (2,000 ft).
- 12 Apr, 21:00 GMT: Crew made their last drift calculation. When the sun disappeared and the clouds obscured the stars, the Bremen climbed to 6,000 feet (1,800 m). Köhl estimated that they were then about three hours from land. If they had been able to stay on course, his estimate would have proven to have been correct. In fact, without the aid of the north star, they then relied on a magnetic compass and drifted far off course toward the north.
- 13 Apr, 06:50 GMT: They saw Polaris again. Fitzmaurice then estimated that their magnetic compass was in error by 40 degrees. Köhl immediately turned southwesterly to follow the east coast of North America towards Mitchel Field on New York's Long Island, which was then about 1,500 miles (2,400 km) south of the Bremen. They flew among the Torngat Mountains of Labrador (then part of the Dominion of Newfoundland) and then, unable to recognize any landmarks, followed the George River upstream in the northeastern part of the Canadian province of Quebec. In order to minimize the adverse effect of a strong southwest wind, Köhl descended into the George River Valley and flew at an altitude of 10 feet (3.0 m).
- 13 Apr, 14:00 GMT: The Bremen passed over the lakes at the source of the George. The crew saw nobody on the ground but people on the ground sighted the plane.
- 13 Apr, 15:00 GMT: The Bremen had crossed back into Labrador, and was seen flying over North West River on the shore of Lake Melville.
- 13 April: At about 17:50 GMT, with about two hours of fuel remaining, and only a general knowledge of their location, the crew spotted a lighthouse on an island with a pack of dogs and four people. The island was Greenly Island in the Strait of Belle Isle, which separates the island of Newfoundland from Labrador and Quebec on the mainland. Greenly Island, only 1 square kilometre (0.39 sq mi) in size, lies about 4 kilometres (2.5 mi) off the Quebec mainland.

== Landing ==
Greenly Island is small, barren and rocky. It was fortunate for the crew that the airplane landed in a peat bog. The relatively soft landing saved them but damaged the plane.

The clock in the lighthouse was remembered (by the family of the lighthouse keeper) as indicating 2 p.m. Atlantic Time when the Bremen was first sighted from the ground. Captain Köhl and Baron von Hünefeld said that they had been in the air for 36½ hours. If their statements of elapsed time had an accuracy of better than one minute, which is unlikely, then the time of touchdown was 18:08 GMT or 13:08 EST or 14:08 Atlantic Time.

Gretta May Ferris, a nurse from Saint John, New Brunswick, who was posted at nearby Forteau's Grenfell Medical Station, travelled by dogsled some 15 miles (24 km) to attend to the crew's medical needs; she was the first to write the story that was picked up by the international media saying that the Bremen had landed and that the crew were safe.

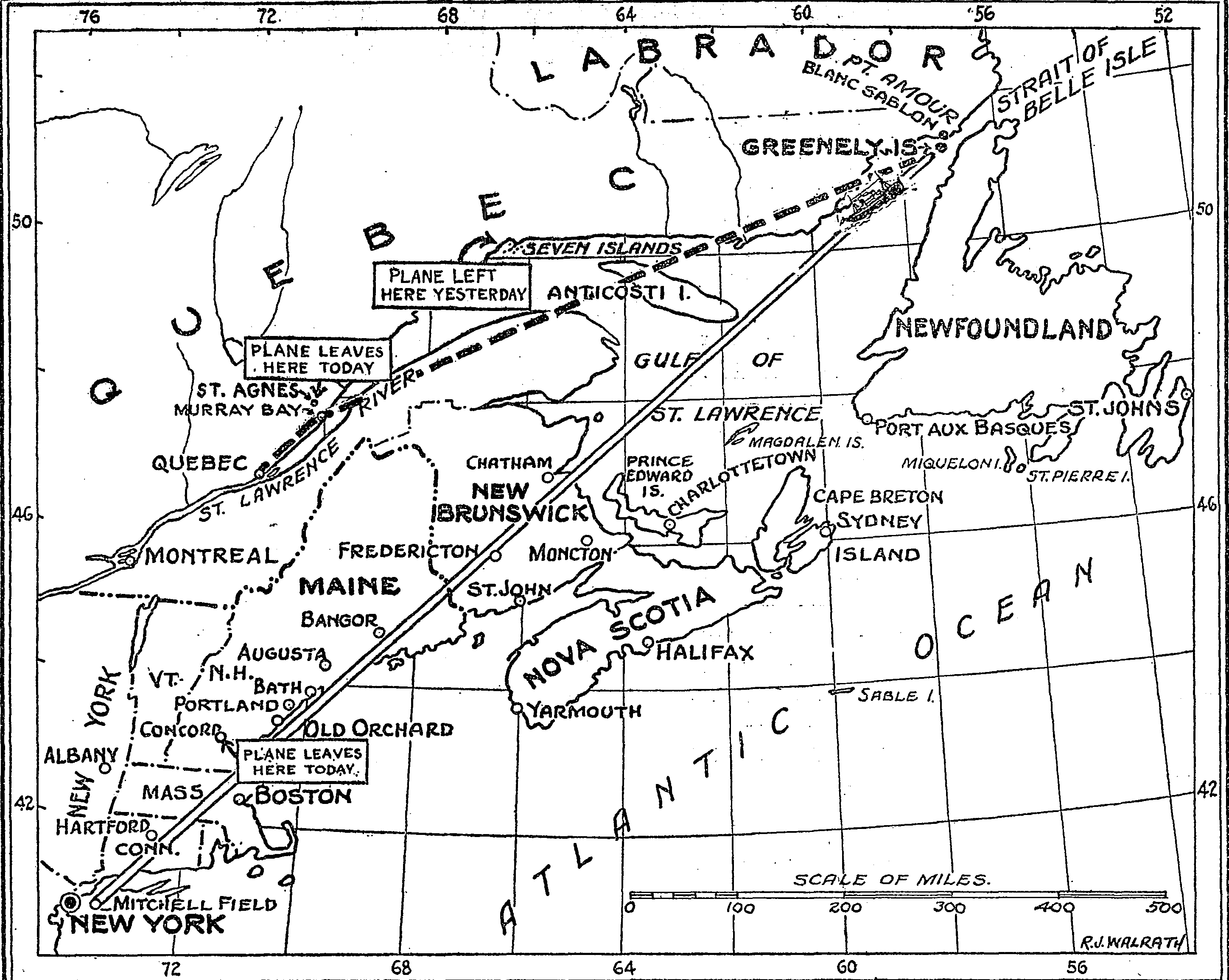
Map in the April 16, 1928 New York Times showing relief expeditions for the Bremen and the location of the island where it landed

Alfred Cormier of Long Point (Lourdes-de-Blanc-Sablon), who operated the local telegraph office from his home, made contact with Marconi station VCL at Point Amour in Labrador—18 miles (29 km) east of Long Point. From there, his message went through St. John's, Newfoundland (at 6:30 p.m.) and Louisbourg, Nova Scotia. It was forwarded by land lines across Canada and via Radio Corporation of America (RCA) station WCC at Chatham, Massachusetts, for transmission to New York City.

The first message read: "German plane at Greenly Island, wind southeast, thick [fog]."

A short time later, a second message was sent: "German plane Bremen landed Greenly Island, noon, slightly damaged, crew well."

By 7:15 p.m., the story was in all the newsrooms of the eastern seaboard.

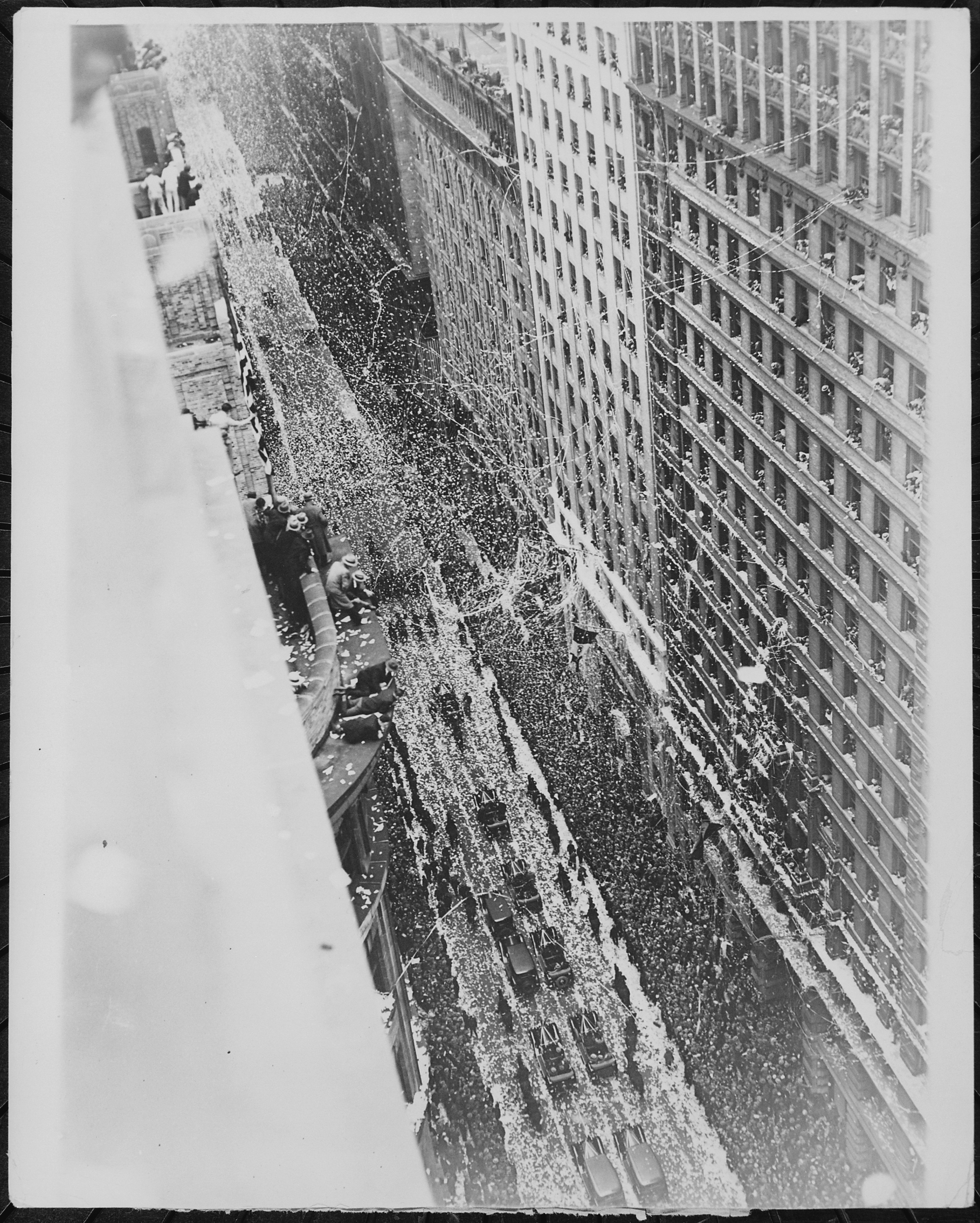
Celebratory parade in New York City (April 30, 1928)

The first Canadian aircraft to reach the scene was piloted by Duke Schiller and the second machine was flown by Canadian Transcontinental Airways (1927–38) Chief Pilot, Roméo Vachon, who arrived two days later with a group of media representatives. Both Schiller and Vachon were flying Fairchild FC-2W machines; G-CAIQ (Schiller) and G-CAIP (Vachon). Ultimately, some 60 journalists would crowd onto the island to report on the successful crossing. The Bremen crew did not depart the island for two weeks as they attempted to repair the aircraft, but they were ultimately unsuccessful.

The crew of the Bremen was rescued by a Ford Trimotor flown by veteran pilots Bernt Balchen (who would later pilot the first aircraft over the South Pole) and Floyd Bennett (who had piloted the first aircraft over the North Pole, in 1926). Bennett was suffering from pneumonia and died in hospital after the flight. On their arrival in New York on April 30, the Bremen's crew were honoured with a tickertape parade.

On 2 May, the 70th United States Congress authorized President Calvin Coolidge to confer the United States Distinguished Flying Cross on the Bremen Flyers. Back in Ireland on 30 June 1928, they were bestowed the Freedom of the City of Dublin in recognition of their trans-Atlantic flight achievement

Later in 1928 they published a book about their experience called (in English) The Three Musketeers of the Air.

== Status ==
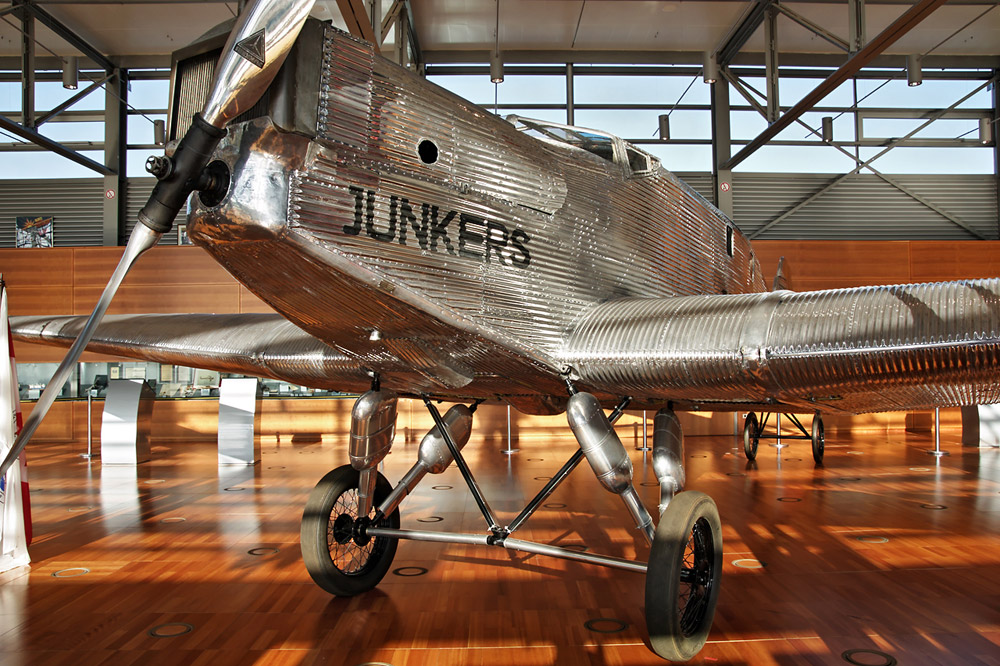
The Bremen in modern times

The Bremen belongs to the Henry Ford Museum in Dearborn, Michigan, and is on display in a hangar at the Bremen Airport Museum.

== See also ==
- P. A. Ó Síocháin
- Spirit of St. Louis
- Cape Cod
- Miss Veedol
- Plus Ultra
- Bird of Paradise
- British airship R34, the first aircraft of any type to perform the east-west trans-Atlantic crossing from July 2–6, 1919
