= Robert McIntosh =

Robert McIntosh or derivatives may refer to:

- Bert McIntosh (1892–1952), Scottish footballer
- Bobby McIntosh, rapper
- Robert A. McIntosh (born 1943), United States Air Force general
- Robert Henry McIntosh (1894–1983), British aviator
- Robert J. McIntosh (1922–2008), United States Representative from Michigan
- Robbie McIntosh (born 1957), English guitarist
- Robert McIntosh (cricketer) (1907–1988), English cricketer
- Robbie McIntosh (drummer) (1950–1974), Scottish drummer
- Robert "Say" McIntosh (1943–2023), restaurant owner and political activist from Little Rock, Arkansas
