= C. D. Barnard =

British pilot (1895–1971)

Charles Douglas Barnard
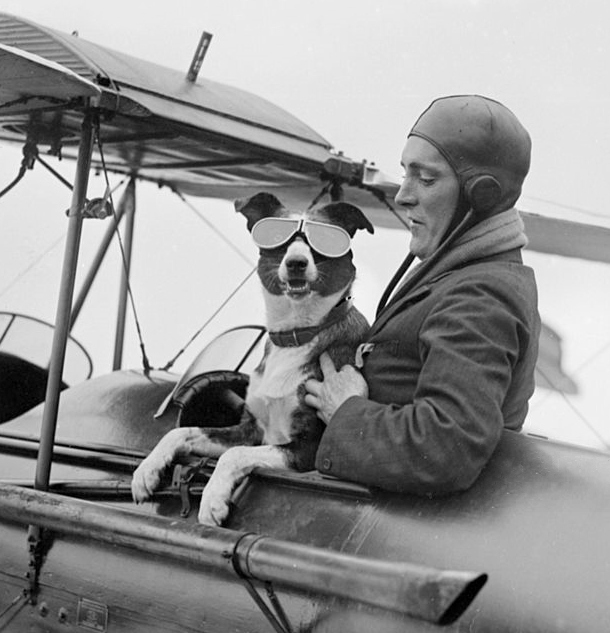
- Barnard with a dog in 1926
- Born: 8 December 1895; London, England
- Died: 7 August 1971 (aged 75); Brighton, Sussex, England
- Occupation: Pilot

Charles Douglas Barnard (8 December 1895 – 7 August 1971) was a British pilot, who took part in 1920s air races and record-breaking flights.

== Early life ==
Charles Barnard was born on 8 December 1895, the son of Charles Gilbert Barnard. He was once reported to be a cousin of Captain Franklyn Leslie Barnard, an airline pilot who was also notable in air racing events, but that was disproved in the results of the 1901 UK census.

== World War I ==
He served as a private with the Honourable Artillery Company, then transferred to the Royal Flying Corps. His service included postings to 2 Squadron and 3 Squadron. In October 1918, he was appointed acting captain, and ended his commission in June 1919. Thereafter, he served on the Royal Air Force reserve list until July 1936.

== Sopwith Aviation ==
In 1919, he was employed by Sopwith Aviation Company, and was briefly assigned to operating Sopwith Gnu (K-101) on pleasure flights from the beach at Southport, where on 10 June 1919, his engine caught fire. He managed to crash land on the beach, thus saving the life of his passenger. He however, received considerable burns to his own face and arms, that required extensive hospitalisation.

== De Havilland Aircraft ==
From 1922 to 1928, he was employed as a flying instructor by De Havilland Aircraft, at Stag Lane Aerodrome. In 1923, he made the first flight between London and Malta.

== 1920s air racing ==
On 14 July 1923, he flew De Havilland DH.9C (G-EBDD) in the King's Cup Race at Hendon Aerodrome, but was placed outside the top three?. On 6 August 1923, he flew Airco DH.9 (G-EBEZ) in the Aerial Derby at Croydon Airport, and finished third. On 4 July 1925, he flew de Havilland DH.51A (G-EBIM) in the King's Cup Race at Croydon Aerodrome, but failed to finish. On 6 July 1930, he flew DH.80A Puss Moth (G-AAXW) in the King's Cup Race at Hanworth Aerodrome, and finished in 13th place.

== 1928/1929 England to India flights ==
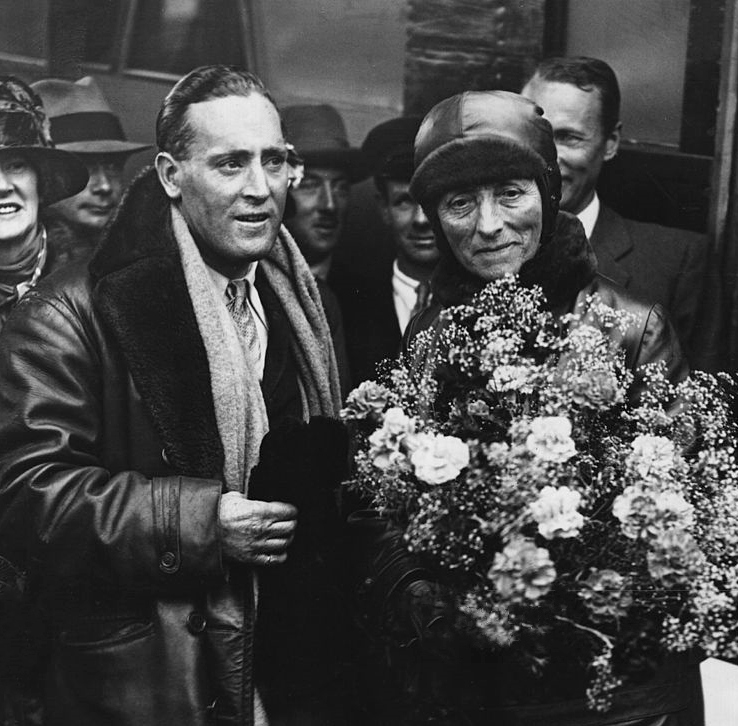
Barnard and Russell returning from their India flight on 9 August 1929

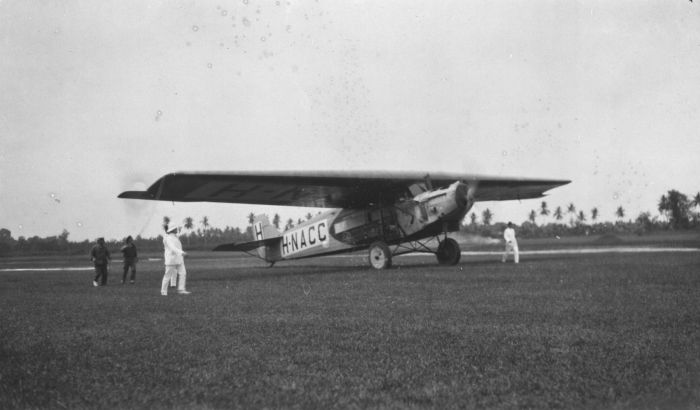
Fokker F.VII similar to G-EBTS

On 10 June 1928, he took off from Lympne Airport in Princess Xenia (registration G-EBTS, a Fokker F.VIIa which had previously been used on unsuccessful attempts at transatlantic and India flights by Jame Fitzmaurice), on a flight to Karachi (then in India). He was accompanied by Flying Officer Eric Herbert Alliott, and the aviator Mary Russell, Duchess of Bedford . At this time, the duchess employed Barnard as personal pilot and flying instructor. The flight was interrupted for about eight weeks at Bushire, Persia, during which the duchess returned to England by sea. A replacement Bristol Jupiter engine was fitted, and the aircraft completed the flight to Karachi. On 2 September 1928, Barnard and Alliott took off from Karachi, towards staging posts at Bushire, Aleppo and Sofia. On 6 September, they reached Croydon for a night landing, after a record breaking flight of 5,000 miles in 4.5 days.

On 2 August 1929, he took off from Lympne Airport Fokker F.VIIa (G-EBTS now renamed 'The Spider') on a flight to Karachi. Co-pilot and mechanic was Robert (Bob) Little, with the Duchess of Bedford also as extra pilot. Again flying Sofia, Aleppo, Bushire, they made the outward journey in 3 days 9 hours. The return began on 6 August reaching Croydon Airport after a record-breaking return flight of 10,000 miles in eight days. Barnard was later awarded a Royal Aero Club Gold Medal.

== 1930 Brian Lewis and C.D. Barnard Ltd ==
In 1930, with Brian Lewis, 2nd Baron Essendon, he co-founded Brian Lewis and C.D. Barnard Ltd for sales of De Havilland aircraft, and based at Heston Aerodrome. In August 1931, Brian Lewis and C.D. Barnard Ltd merged with the aviation department of Selfridges to become Brian Lewis & Co., Ltd.

== 1930 England to Cape Town flight ==
On 10 April 1930, he took off from Lympne in Fokker F.VIIa (G-EBTS, renamed 'The Spider'), on a flight to Cape Town. He was accompanied by Robert (Bob) Little, and Mary Duchess of Bedford, who had purchased the aircraft in September 1929.On 19 April, they reached Maitland aerodrome, Cape Town, after a record-breaking time of 91 hours and twenty minutes flying over 10 days. On 29 April, during the return flight, a forced landing was made at Dragoman, Bulgaria. The next day, they returned to Croydon after repairs to the engine oil system. Later, Fokker awarded a silver commemorative medal to Barnard.

== 1930 solo flights England to Malta and Tangier ==
On 31 July 1930, he took off from Lympne in a DH.80A Puss Moth (G-AAXW) on a flight to Malta. The next day he returned to Croydon after two non-stop flights totalling 2,800 miles in 27.5 flying hours. On 25 August 1930, he took off from Lympne in a Puss Moth (G-AAXW) on a flight to Tangier. The next day he returned to Croydon after two non-stop flights, totalling 2,480 miles in 21.5 flying hours. In doing so, he was trying open up future passenger routes and improve the speed of news sent from distant locations. Several films (some with sound) were made of his 1930 flights.

== 1931 Barnard's Air Tours ==
In 1931, he formed C.D. Barnard Air Tours Ltd. On 1 April 1931, he started an extensive tour of England with displays and joy-riding flights for the paying public. Aircraft used were the Fokker F.VIIa (G-EBTS), Spartan Three Seater Mk 1 (G-ABJS), an Avro Avian Sports, a Desoutter II, Potez 36 (F-ALJC 'Ladybird'), and a Cierva C.19 autogiro (G-AALA). Pilots included Ayre, Barnard, Crossley and Reginald Brie. During their tour of six months, Capt. Barnard and his fellow pilots visited 118 towns in 50 different counties, and gave 370 performances. Approximately 40,000 people were carried on flights.

== 1931 Barnard's Eastern Cruise ==
Egypt Palestine Dec 1931?

== 1932 Bristol-Cardiff air service ==
In June 1932, Barnard purchased the Fokker F.VIIa (G-EBTS) from the Duchess of Bedford. He based it at Heston Aerodrome, and used it mainly for personal charters to overseas destinations. In July 1932, he flew a demonstration passenger service from Bristol (Whitchurch) Airport to Cardiff Municipal Airport, for which the Fokker F.VIIa was leased to British Air Navigation Co Ltd (BANCO). The service was terminated after about two weeks.

== 1934 India Air Pageants ==
In December 1933, Barnard flew Fokker F.VIIa (G-EBTS) to Mumbai (Bombay) for use in his 'flying circus' tour of India, promoted as "India's First Aerial Pageant". Other aircraft used included a DH.82A Tiger Moth, DH.83 Fox Moth, Spartan Three-Seater, a Blackburn Segrave and a BAC Drone. Pilots included R. L. Palmer, J. B. Pugh, J. Mackay, E. R. Andrews, W. A. Burnside, and J. R. Hatchett. By April 1934, Barnard, his partner A. H. Dalton, and his pilots had arranged 92 air displays, carried 9,241 passengers, and flown about 20,000 miles. In May 1935, Barnard sold the Fokker in India.

On 17 July 1936, Barnard relinquished his commission on completion of service.

== Personal life ==
In 1928, Barnard, together with other eminent aviators of the day, formed the Guild of Air Pilots and Air Navigators, to create rules and regulations of the profession, and to set up and maintain standards surrounding the control of flight. He received the 6th Private Flying Licence to be awarded.

On 9 December 1929, he married Mrs. Melita Erna May.

In 1930, he authored and published a book on flying – 'Barnard on Learning to Fly.'

In October 1930, Barnard planned to join Charles Kingsford Smith on a record breaking flight to Australia, but Kingsford Smith made it a solo flight.

In May 1932, in Popular Flying magazine, a story was written about CD Barnard titled 'My Most Thrilling Flight'.

In 1935, C.D. Barnard was recorded on Lambert and Butler's 'Famous British Airmen and Airwomen' cigarette cards for his record flights.

On 7 August 1971, Barnard died at Brighton.

== Bibliography ==
- Barnard, Capt C.D. 1931. Barnard on Learning to Fly. Sampson Low, Marston and Co ASIN B005KDYC8I
- Jackson, A.J. 1974. British Civil Aircraft since 1919 Volume 2. Putnam ISBN 0370100107
- King, H.F. 1981. Sopwith Aircraft 1912–1920. Putnam ISBN 0-370-30050-5
- Lewis, Peter. 1970. British Racing and Record-Breaking Aircraft. Putnam ISBN 0370000676
