= Princess Xenia (aircraft) =

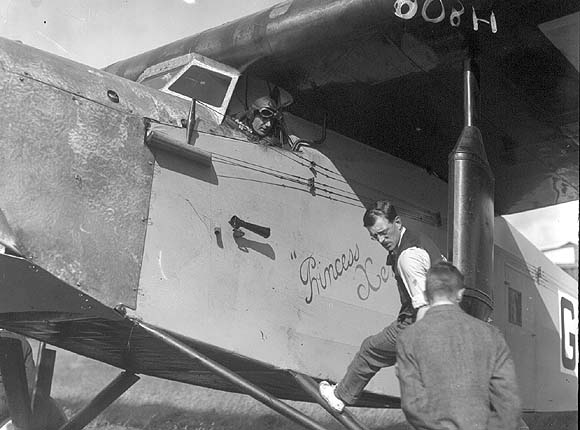
- Princess Xenia with Robert H. McIntosh in the cockpit

General information
- Other name: The Spider
- Type: Fokker F.VIIa
- Owners: William B. Leeds; Mary Russell, Duchess of Bedford; Sir Dossabhoy Hormusjee Bhiwandiwalla

History
- Manufactured: 1925
- Fate: Broken up 1937

Princess Xenia was a Fokker F.VIIa aircraft, built in 1925 for the Dutch airline KLM and initially used for regular journeys between Amsterdam and London via Rotterdam. In 1927, it was bought by a wealthy American who was married to a Russian princess and named the aircraft Princess Xenia after her. He loaned the aircraft to aviator Robert Henry McIntosh, also known as 'All-Weather Mac'. In 1927, McIntosh and two others flew the aircraft in an attempt to make the east-to-west transatlantic flight, but failed. Princess Xenia was subsequently commissioned to fly non-stop from London to India, though unsuccessfully.

The aircraft was later sold to the consortium 'Air Communications Ltd' and given the name of The Spider by Mary Russell, Duchess of Bedford, who on 2 August 1929, with Captain C. D. Barnard, departed on a record-breaking flight from Lympne Airport to Karachi (then in British India) and returned to Croydon Airport, England, in less than eight days. It subsequently broke the record for a flight from London to Cape Town and back.

In 1934 the aircraft was sold to Sir Dossabhoy Hormusjee Bhiwandiwalla in Bombay (now Mumbai). It was broken up in 1937.

== Early flights ==
Princess Xenia was a standard Fokker F.VIIa monoplane that was built in 1925 for the Dutch airline KLM. During its first two years it flew regularly between Amsterdam and London via Rotterdam.

== Transatlantic attempt ==
On 2 February 1927, the aircraft was registered in Britain as G-EBTS. It had been bought by the son of millionaire William B. Leeds, also named William B. Leeds, who named the aircraft after his wife, the Russian Princess Xenia. Leeds subsequently loaned the aircraft to Captain Robert McIntosh (also known as All-Weather Mac), in whose name the aircraft was registered. Together with Irish Air Corps Commandant James Fitzmaurice, McIntosh made a failed attempt to cross the Atlantic from Baldonnel Aerodrome near Dublin on 16 September 1927. After five and a half hours of flight and 300 miles over the Atlantic, bad weather caused them to return. They landed with a crash at Beale strand, close to Ballybunion, County Kerry. At the time, the aircraft was brown/gold and blue, without cabin windows and marked with G-EBTS. It was fitted with a single Bristol Jupiter engine.

== London to India ==
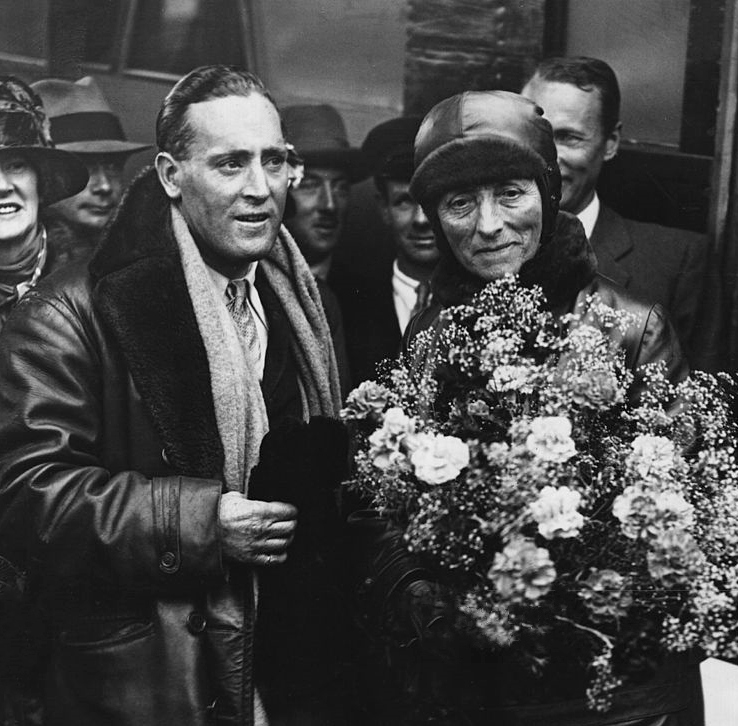
C. D. Barnard and Mary Russell 1929

In late 1927, McIntosh and Bert Hinkler attempted to fly non-stop to India in the Princess Xenia. They began the journey from Upavon Aerodrome, Wiltshire with the aim of breaking the Clarence Chamberlin and Charles A. Levine world record long-distance flight. After McIntosh's forced landing in Poland, the aircraft was sold to the consortium 'Air Communications Ltd'.

It then took the name of The Spider by Mary Du Caurroy Russell, Duchess of Bedford who on 2 August 1929, with Captain C. D. Barnard, departed on a record-breaking flight from Lympne Airport to Karachi and returned to Croydon Airport, England in less than eight days.

== London to Cape Town ==
In 1930 the aircraft, with the Duchess, Barnard and Mr. Little, made a record journey from London to Cape Town and back, covering 18,800 miles and taking a total of 20 days.

== Later years ==
Barnard later organised joy rides and shows with the aircraft registered to his company 'India Air Pageants Ltd'. Sir Dossabhoy Hormusjee Bhiwandiwalla was its last owner before the aircraft was scrapped in 1937.

== Aviators ==
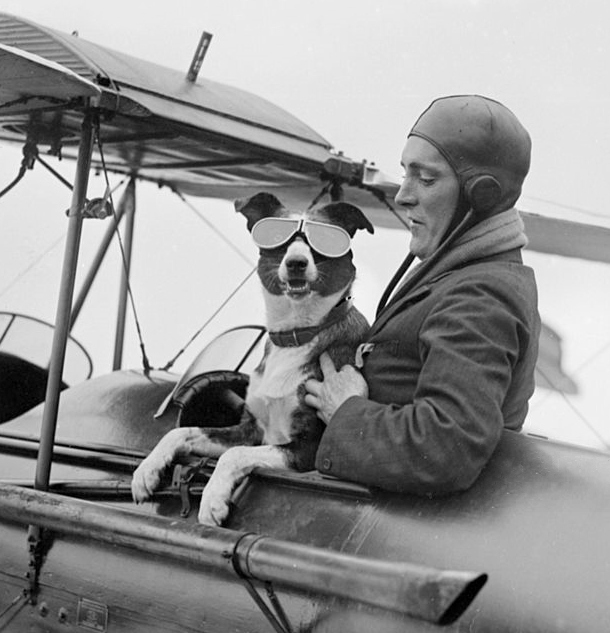
C.D. Barnard (1926)

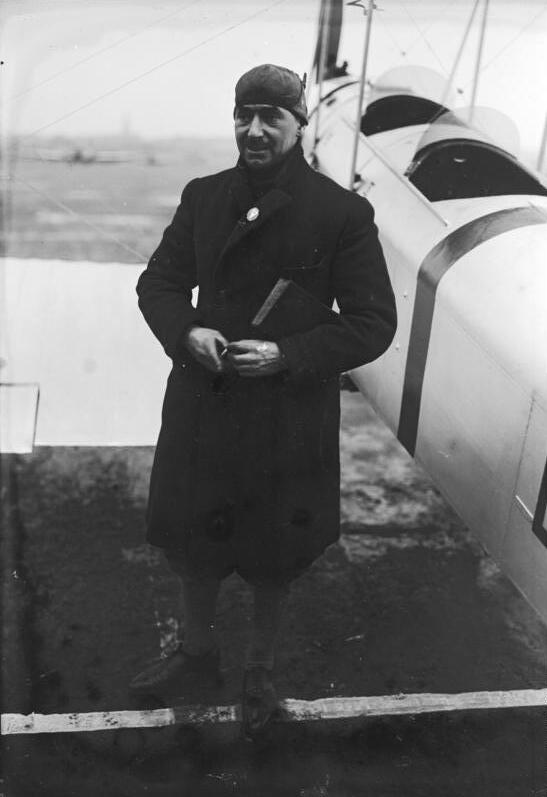
James A. Fitzmaurice (1928)

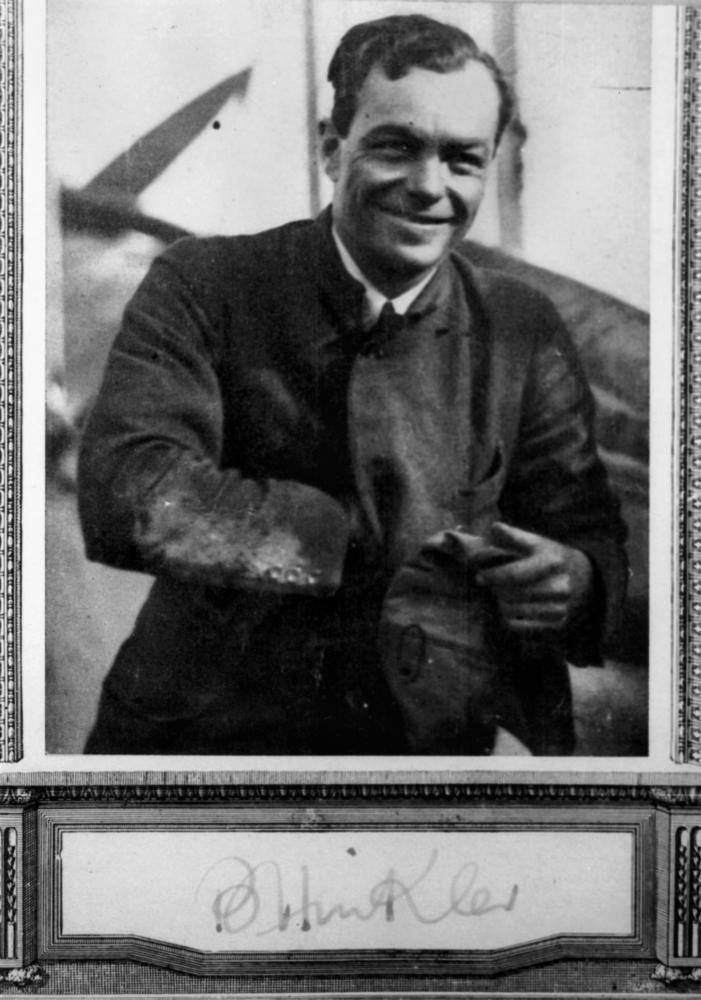
Bert Hinkler (1928)

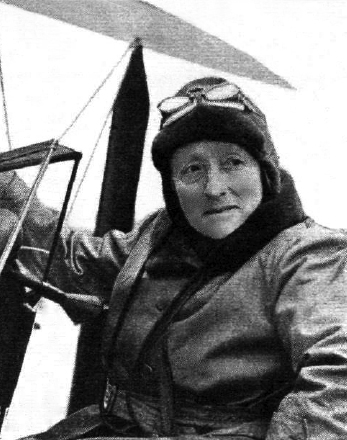
Mary Russell, Duchess of Bedford (1937)

== See also ==
- St. Raphael
