= Casement Aerodrome =

Military airbase in County Dublin, Ireland

Casement Aerodrome Aeradróm Mhic Easmainn
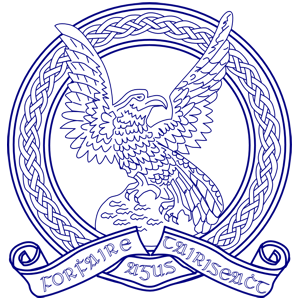

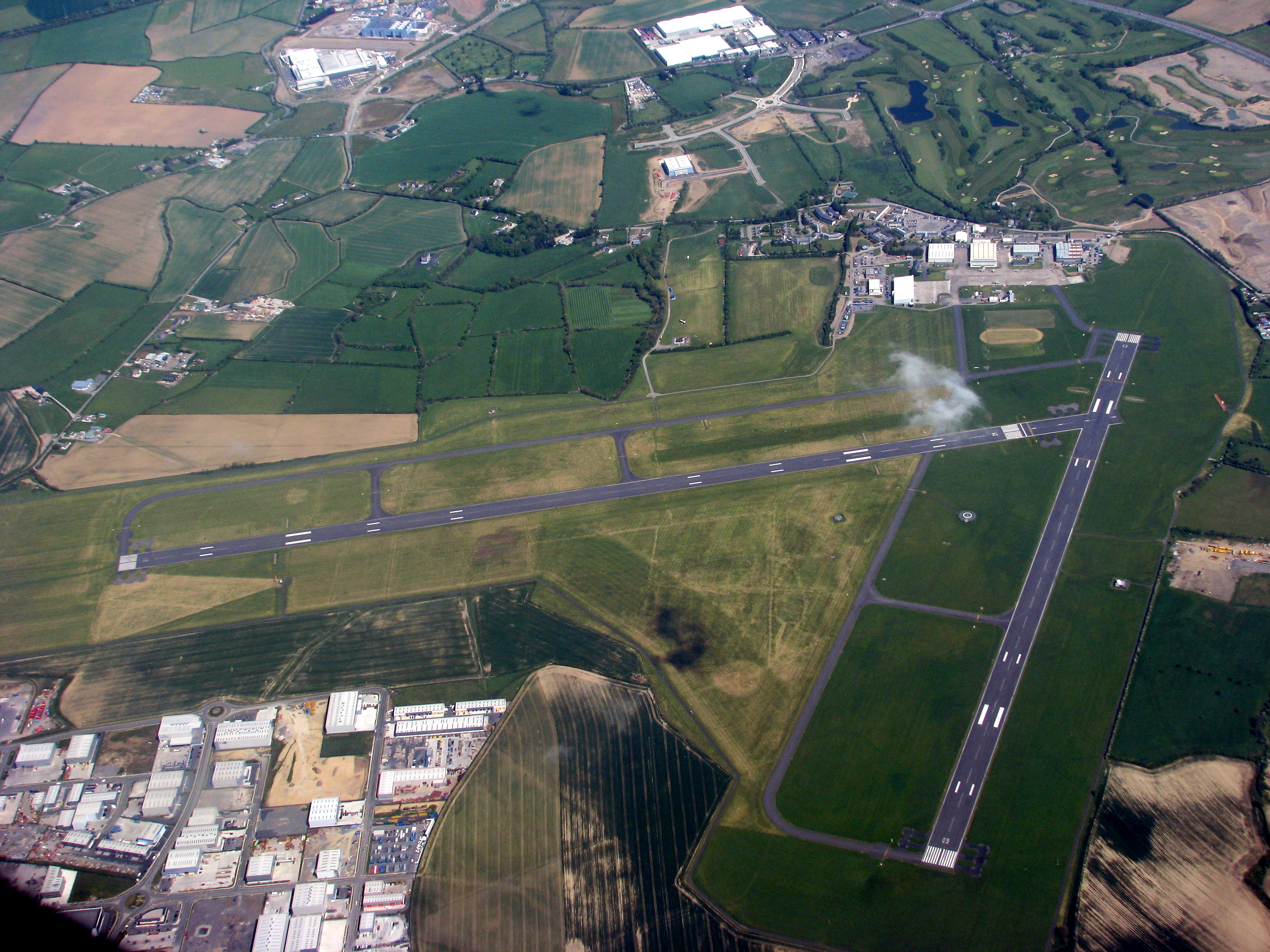
- IATA: none; ICAO: EIME

Summary
- Airport type: Military
- Owner: Department of Defence
- Operator: Irish Air Corps
- Location: Baldonnel, County Dublin, Ireland
- Elevation AMSL: 319 ft (97 m)
- Coordinates: 53°18′06″N 06°27′04″W
- Website: Air Corps

Map
- Location of airport in County Dublin Location of airport in Ireland

Runways
Direction	Length		Surface
Direction	ft	m	Surface
04/22	4,800	1,463	Asphalt
10/28	6,001	1,829	Asphalt

Casement Aerodrome (Irish: Aeradróm Mhic Easmainn) or Baldonnel Aerodrome (ICAO: EIME) is a military airbase to the southwest of Dublin, Ireland situated off the N7 main road route to the south and south west. It is the headquarters and the sole airfield of the Irish Air Corps, and is also used for other government purposes.

The airport is the property of the Irish Department of Defence. Baldonnel Aerodrome is also the home of the Garda Air Support Unit.

== History ==
The airfield was first laid out in 1917 and was used by the Royal Flying Corps (soon to become the Royal Air Force). It was part of the RAF's Ireland Command.

In 1919, civilian flights commenced, with a service from London.

The aerodrome was originally run by two pilots from the Royal Air Force. The airfield was the one from which the first successful east–west Atlantic crossing by a Junkers W33 aeroplane, the Bremen, took off on 12 April 1928 with Baron Hünefeld, Hermann Köhl and Captain James Fitzmaurice as co-pilot; and the first Aer Lingus flight took place from here on 27 May 1936. It was also the destination at which Douglas Corrigan landed on his famous 'wrong way' flight across the Atlantic on 18 July 1938.

In February 1965, Baldonnel was renamed Casement Aerodrome in honour of the Irish nationalist Roger Casement, executed for treason by the British in 1916.

In 1995 it was suggested that it be used as a second commercial airport for Dublin, especially for low-cost carriers such as Ryanair.

Anti-war activists have accused the government of allowing the aerodrome's use as a US military stopover hub, with protests in 2006 leading to arrests. In March 2002, Michael Smith, the Minister for Defence, confirmed that since September 2001, 22 US military aircraft had landed at the aerodrome. There has also been speculation since the early 2000s that Casement Aerodrome is used as an airport by the Central Intelligence Agency (CIA) for their extraordinary rendition programme. Similar claims have been made with regard to Shannon Airport, but as Baldonnel is a military airport, it is impossible to verify.

Queen Elizabeth II landed at Casement Aerodrome on 17 May 2011, beginning her state visit to Ireland.

== Climate ==
Climate data for Dublin (Casement), 1981–2010 normals, extremes 1958–present
Month	Jan	Feb	Mar	Apr	May	Jun	Jul	Aug	Sep	Oct	Nov	Dec	Year
Record high °C (°F)	15.4 (59.7)	15.9 (60.6)	21.0 (69.8)	22.7 (72.9)	24.9 (76.8)	27.6 (81.7)	31.9 (89.4)	30.5 (86.9)	25.4 (77.7)	23.4 (74.1)	17.7 (63.9)	15.4 (59.7)	31.9 (89.4)
Mean daily maximum °C (°F)	8.0 (46.4)	8.2 (46.8)	10.2 (50.4)	12.4 (54.3)	15.2 (59.4)	17.9 (64.2)	19.8 (67.6)	19.5 (67.1)	17.1 (62.8)	13.6 (56.5)	10.2 (50.4)	8.3 (46.9)	13.4 (56.1)
Daily mean °C (°F)	5.1 (41.2)	5.1 (41.2)	6.8 (44.2)	8.2 (46.8)	10.9 (51.6)	13.6 (56.5)	15.7 (60.3)	15.4 (59.7)	13.3 (55.9)	10.3 (50.5)	7.2 (45.0)	5.4 (41.7)	9.7 (49.5)
Mean daily minimum °C (°F)	2.1 (35.8)	2.0 (35.6)	3.3 (37.9)	4.1 (39.4)	6.6 (43.9)	9.4 (48.9)	11.5 (52.7)	11.3 (52.3)	9.5 (49.1)	7.0 (44.6)	4.2 (39.6)	2.4 (36.3)	6.1 (43.0)
Record low °C (°F)	−13.2 (8.2)	−10.3 (13.5)	−9.8 (14.4)	−5.5 (22.1)	−3.0 (26.6)	−0.7 (30.7)	2.5 (36.5)	1.5 (34.7)	−0.3 (31.5)	−4.1 (24.6)	−9.1 (15.6)	−15.7 (3.7)	−15.7 (3.7)
Average precipitation mm (inches)	63.8 (2.51)	48.5 (1.91)	50.7 (2.00)	51.9 (2.04)	59.1 (2.33)	62.5 (2.46)	54.2 (2.13)	72.3 (2.85)	60.3 (2.37)	81.6 (3.21)	73.7 (2.90)	75.7 (2.98)	754.2 (29.69)
Average precipitation days (≥ 1.0 mm)	12	10	11	10	11	10	10	11	10	12	11	12	130
Average snowy days	4.1	3.9	2.5	1.1	0.1	0.0	0.0	0.0	0.0	0.0	0.5	2.3	14.6
Average relative humidity (%) (at 15:00 UTC)	82.2	76.7	71.8	67.7	67.3	67.9	68.9	69.0	71.8	76.6	81.6	84.1	73.8
Mean monthly sunshine hours	52.7	70.6	102.3	153.0	186.0	159.0	151.9	148.8	123.0	102.3	66.0	46.5	1,362.1
Mean daily sunshine hours	1.7	2.5	3.3	5.1	6.0	5.3	4.9	4.8	4.1	3.3	2.2	1.5	3.7
Source: Met Éireann

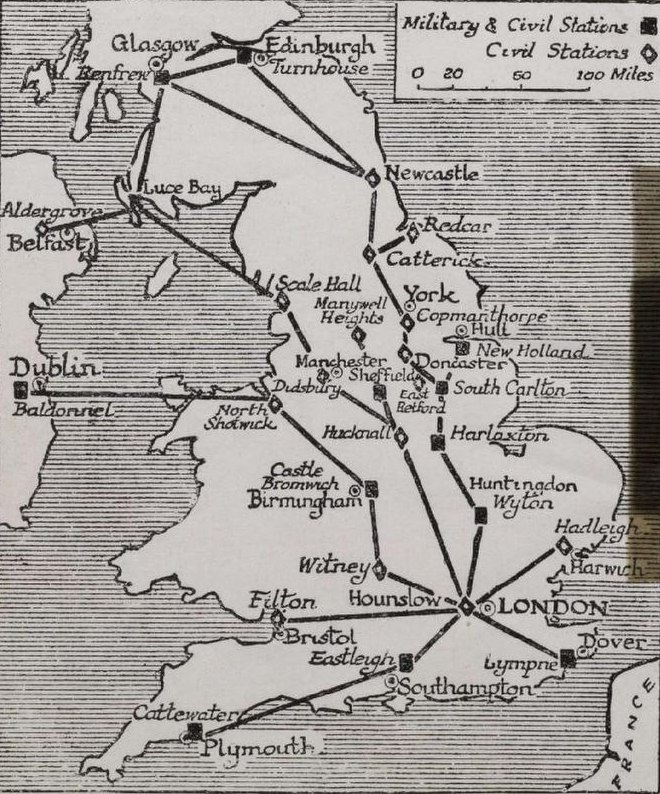
"Map of Air Routes and Landing Places in Great Britain, as temporarily arranged by the Air Ministry for civilian flying", published in 1919, showing the route between Baldonnel and Hounslow, near London

== See also ==
- List of Irish military installations
