= Robert Henry McIntosh =

British military pilot (1894–1984)

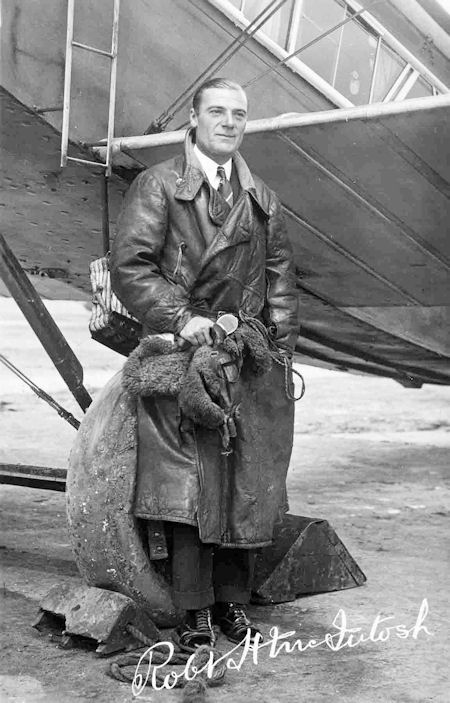
- Born: 23 September 1894
- Died: 1983 (aged 88–89)

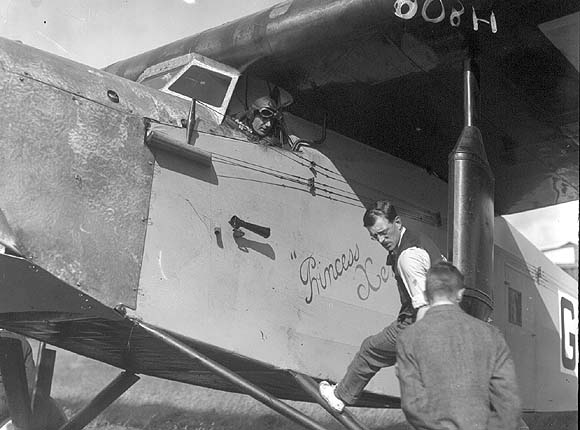
McIntosh in cockpit of the aircraft Princess Xenia

Robert Henry McIntosh (23 September 1894–1983), also known as All-Weather Mac following his ability to land safely in a six passenger Handley Page 0/400 in dense fog at Croydon Airport in October 1921, was a British wing commander and one of Imperial Airways' 16 original pilots. In 1927, he made unsuccessful attempts to fly at first across the Atlantic with James Fitzmaurice and then to fly to India and back with Bert Hinkler, both on the aircraft Princess Xenia, a Dutch Fokker F.VIIa.

A road, McIntosh Close, in Roundshaw, London Borough of Sutton, is named after him.

== Career ==
McIntosh served with the Merchant Navy before the First World War. When war broke out he joined the British Army, serving as a despatch rider before joining the Royal Flying Corps and learning to fly. In October 1918, he joined No. 214 Squadron RAF, equipped with the Handley Page O/400 heavy bomber. In September 1919 he left the RAF to join the airline Handley Page Transport, flying commercial scheduled services to Europe from Handley Page Transport's base at Cricklewood Aerodrome.
