= Junkers W 33 =

German single-engine low-wing monoplane transport aircraft

W 33
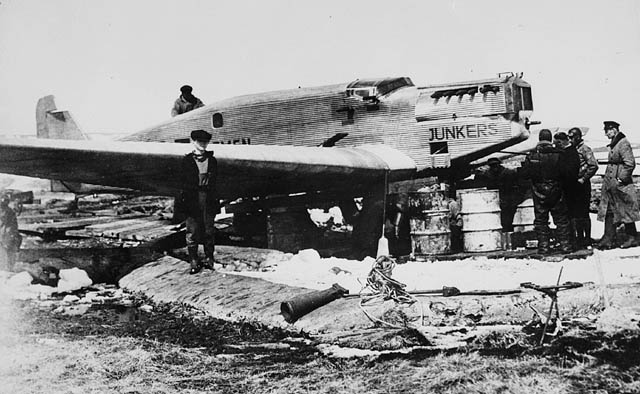
- W 33 Bremen after its historic Atlantic crossing.

General information
- Type: Transport
- Manufacturer: Junkers
- Designer: Herman Pohlmann
- Status: retired
- Number built: 199

History
- Manufactured: 1927–34
- Introduction date: 1927
- First flight: 17 June 1926
- Variants: Junkers W 34; Junkers Ju 46

The Junkers W 33 was a German 1920s single-engine low-wing monoplane transport aircraft that followed Junkers standard practice making extensive use of corrugated aluminium alloy over an aluminium alloy tube frame, that was developed from the similar but slightly smaller Junkers F 13, and evolved into the similar W 34. One example, named Bremen, was the first aircraft to complete the much more difficult east–west non-stop heavier-than-air crossing of the Atlantic.

== Design and development ==
Like all Junkers designs from the J 7 fighter onwards, it used a duraluminum aluminium alloy structure covered with Junkers' characteristic corrugated dural skin. While the Junkers W 33 was unusual when compared to the contemporary biplanes in use in the UK and the US, cantilever monoplanes were a popular design choice in continental Europe during the period, and the Junkers designs were unusual only in their extensive use of closely corrugated metal skins. Unlike the skins on the contemporary Rohrbach Roland, those on the Junkers aircraft were not load bearing and it did not have a stressed skin structure. The Junkers W 33 was a direct evolution of the 1919 four-seat airliner, the Junkers F 13. The F 13 was similar to the W 33, but slightly smaller and had some detail differences. Considerable evolution occurred in the structure of the F 13, so that later models shared more details with the W 33. The wings had the same span as the late F 13s, though the planform differed slightly, while the length was the same as the F 13fe.

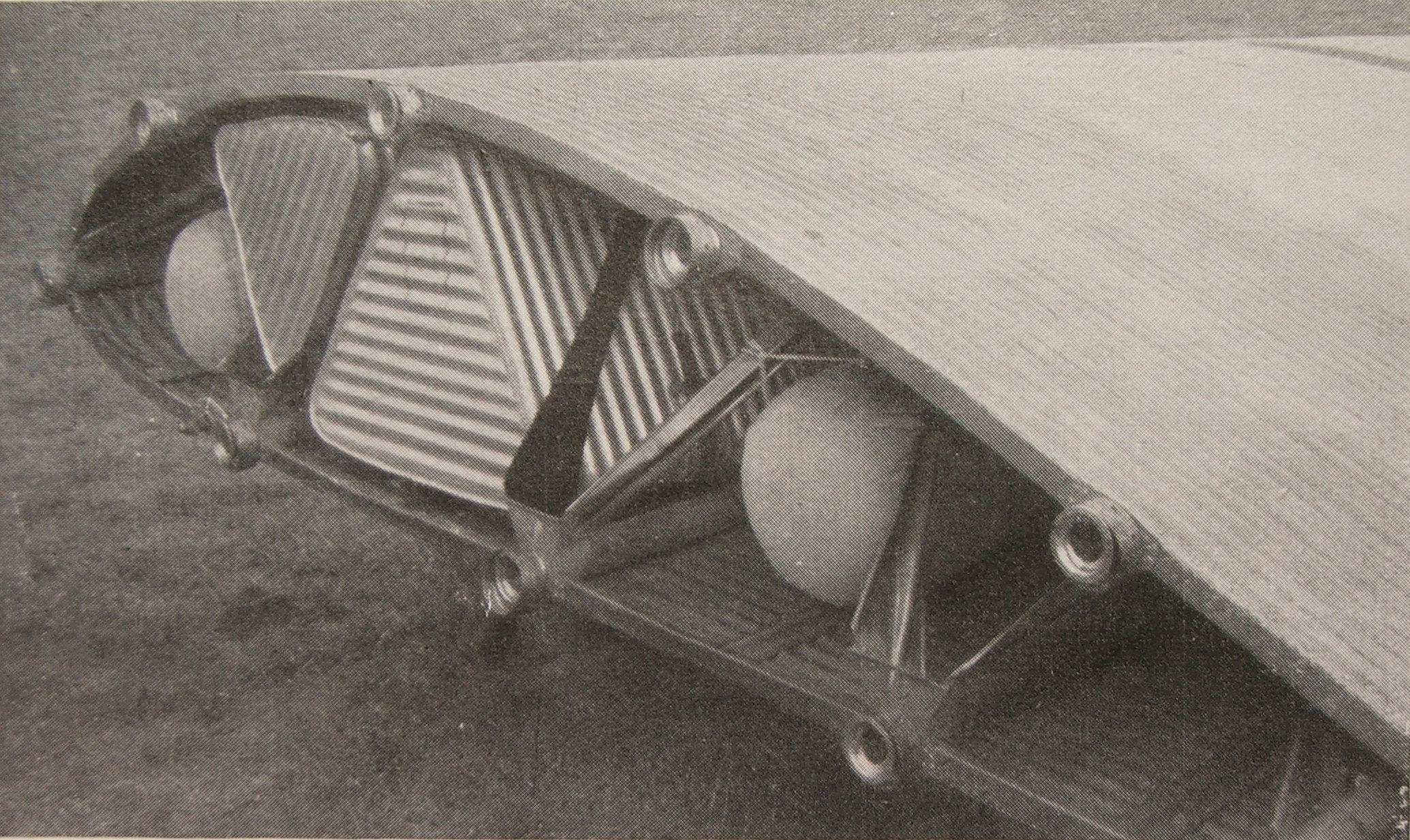
Cross section of the W33 wing

A slightly different fuselage cross section gave the W 33 a squarer cabin with a hunch-backed appearance compared to that of the F 13 and a door was provided on the port side to provide access to the freight compartment. Early examples of the W 33 had an open cockpit much like the F 13, although it lacked the structural member that divided the pilot and co-pilot, and the corresponding and very distinctive coamings. Some examples, such as the transatlantic machines had an early enclosed cockpit.

The 228 kW (306 hp) Junkers L5 upright inline water-cooled engine was also the same as used in the F 13fe, a more powerful engine than used in many of the F 13 variants. The W 33 differed primarily from the W 34 in normally using an inline engine (aside from the rare dGao variant, which served as a prototype for the W 34), while the W 34 generally used various radial engines and had some minor detail improvements, such as a larger enclosed cockpit.

As was common for the time, when a wheeled undercarriage was fitted, a conventional fixed undercarriage was used with a tailwheel. Early examples had a similar undercarriage to that used on the F 13, in which a hinged cross axle connected the two main wheels, while later examples provided an independent three-legged structure for each wheel. The Junkers W letter may have denoted the type as a seaplane (for Wasserflugzeuge), but in practice W 33s were equipped as either landplanes or seaplanes, as needed. As a floatplane, the W 33 was equipped with two main floats, braced to the fuselage with a forest of struts.

The prototype W 33, registered D-921, first flew as a seaplane from Leopoldshafen, on the river Elbe near Dessau on 17 June 1926. Production began in 1927 and ran until 1934 and most of the 198 production machines were built at the Junkers works at Dessau, but a small number were assembled at Junker's Swedish subsidiary AB Flygindustri at Limhamn near Malmö, and at Fili, near Moscow in the USSR. Both of these plants had originally been built to avoid Allied post-war restrictions on aircraft manufacturing in Germany following World War One, that had been considerably eased by the time the W 33 was flying.

In 1934 a Junkers W33 was used to test the Junkers Jumo 210 engine. It was flown with a 680 hp version on 5 July 1934.

== Operational history ==
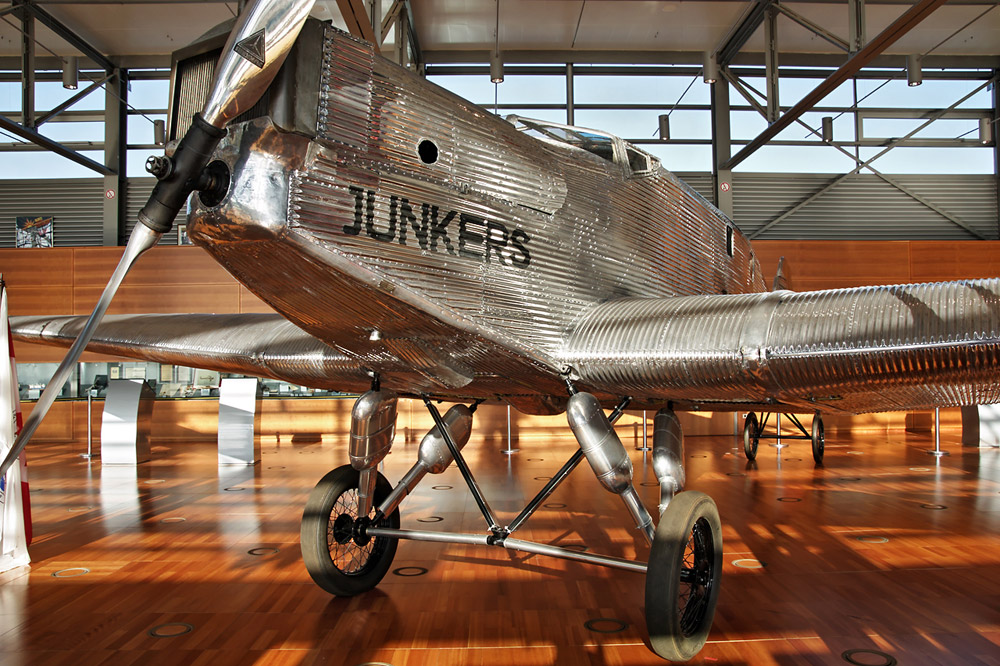
Transatlantic W 33 on display at Bremen airport

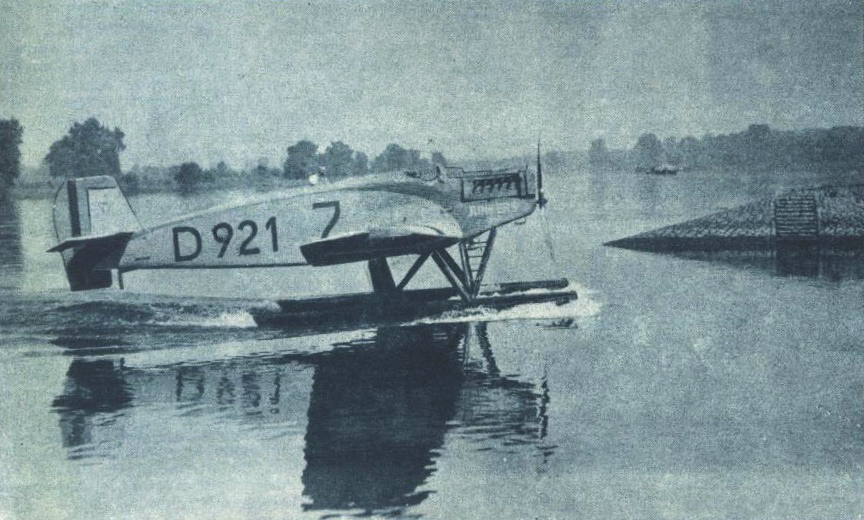
Junkers W 33 first prototype D-921 at the Deutschen Seeflug competition, July 1926

Soon after their first flights the first two W 33 prototypes competed at the Deutschen Seeflug seaplane competition at Warnemünde in July 1926, with the first prototype W 33 competing as no.7, and coming in second in the contest while the second prototype, a W 33a, competed as no.8.

W 33s were used by many operators across the world in the late 1920s and 1930s, as transports and mailplanes. Deutsche Luft Hansa only had four that they used for mail from 1929. Others were flown as survey aircraft and crop-sprayers. Later, despite their obsolescence, the Luftwaffe would use some as trainers alongside W 34s.

The Colombian Air Force used Junkers W 33, W 34 and the militarized W 34, the K 43, during the Colombia-Peru War of 1932–1933. The Ethiopian Air Force operated a single W 33c during the Second Italo-Abyssinian War.

One Junkers W 33g was used by the Swedish Air Force from 1933 to 1935 as an air ambulance under the designation Trp2. This aircraft may have been assembled at Linhamm, as were four W 33s exported to Australia. After World War II, this aircraft was used as a utility transport by the Swedish Air Force's F 2 Hägernäs squadron and in June 1952, it participated in the search and rescue operation during the Catalina affair, in which two Soviet MiG-15s shot down a Swedish Douglas C-47 intelligence aircraft and the Search and Rescue Consolidated Catalina sent out after it.

Of the 17 W 33s assembled in Russia at Fili from imported parts at least 9 appeared on that country's civil register. In Russian service, they were given the designation PS-3 as the third Passazhirskii Samolyot (passenger aircraft or airliner), while at least 17 Russian examples were built by GVF workshops with numerous improvements with the designation PS-4.

=== Flight records ===
The Junkers W 33 set numerous records, and one example, named the Bremen, made the first east-to-west crossing of the Atlantic by airplane.

The North Atlantic had previously been crossed by the US Navy Curtiss NC-4 flying boat, with numerous stops, and by Alcock and Brown in 1919 in a Vickers Vimy, nonstop, and by others, but all of these heavier than air aircraft flew the easier west to east route, which had the prevailing winds helping them along with a tailwind. On April 12–13, 1928, the W 33 D-1167 Bremen was flown by Köhl, von Hünefeld and Fitzmaurice from Baldonnel, Ireland near Dublin into the prevailing winds, to Greenly Island, off the coast of Quebec in the St. Lawrence River, in 37 hours. Strong winds took them north of their intended destination, which was to have been New York, and they put down near the first settlement they found, but caused minor damage to the aircraft that required some time to repair before they continued. Their aircraft is now on display at Bremen Airport in Germany. The Bremen was one of two aircraft making the attempt, however the Europa never made it out of Germany. A W 33 set class C world records for an endurance flight of 52 hours, 22 minutes and for covering a distance of (4,661 km (2,896 mi)) during a single flight around Dessau between 3 and 5 August 1927, piloted by Johann Risztics and Edzard. Earlier Fritz Loose and W.N. Schnabele had set another Class C record for duration and distance, while carrying a 500 kg (1,100 lb) load. For that flight they remained aloft for 22 hours 11 minutes and travelled 2,736 km (1,700 mi). At about the same time, the W 33 set a similar pair of records in Class Cbis (Seaplanes). A substantially modified W 33 fitted with a radial engine and so sometimes erroneously referred to as a W 34, flown by Willy Neuenhofen set an altitude record of 12,740 m (41,800 ft) on 26 May 1929.

The first Swedish-assembled W 33 was completed in May 1930, and delivered two months later to Japan. With Eiichiri Baba flying under the command of Lt. Col. Kiyoshi Honma, and with Tomoyoshi as the radio operator, J-BFUB, named Third Hochi Japan-US departed Sabishiro Beach near Misawa on 24 September 1932 in an attempt to cross the Pacific Ocean to the US, but they disappeared en route. Their last radio transmission indicated that they were passing to the south of Etorofu Island. Neither wreckage nor survivors were ever found, despite an extensive search. (see also List of missing aircraft#1920-1939)

== Accidents and incidents ==
- 15 May 1932 – D-1925 Atlantis flown by Hans Bertram and Adolph Klausman landed on the Kimberly coast of Western Australia while attempting to fly from Kupang to Darwin due to a navigational error, the crew were not rescued until June 1932.
- 29 October 1932 – D-2017 Marmara of Luft Hansa was on a freight flight from Croydon to Cologne when it crashed off the Kent coast.

== Variants ==
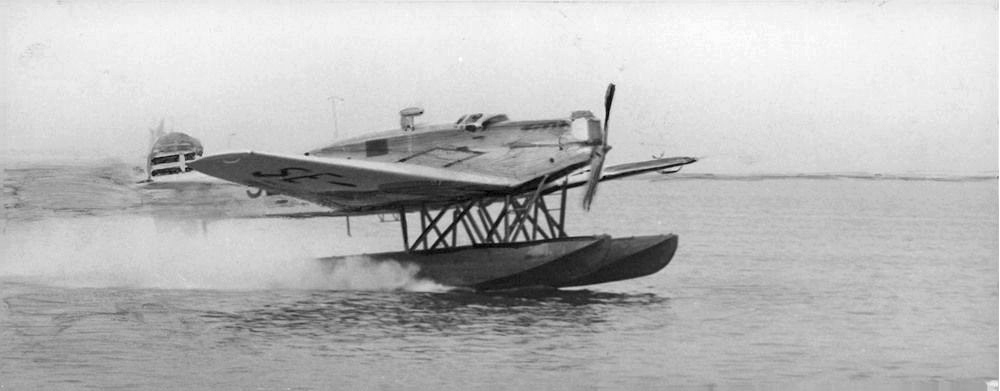
W33 floatplane

Junkers W 33
-b.-c,-dd and -f powered by a 230 kW (310 hp) Junkers L5 water-cooled inline engine.
Junkers W 33
-c3e and -he powered by a 250 kW (340 hp) Junkers L5G water-cooled inline engine.
Junkers W 33
-dGao powered by a 400 kW (540 hp) Siemens Sh 20 radial engine.
Junkers W 34
A 6-passenger development powered by a variety of radial engines.
Junkers K 43
Bombing and reconnaissance version built in Sweden, equipped for machine guns in the cabin roof and floor.
PS-3
Soviet designation for German built examples.
PS-4
Soviet designation for locally produced modification.
Trp2
Swedish Air Force designation.

== Operators ==
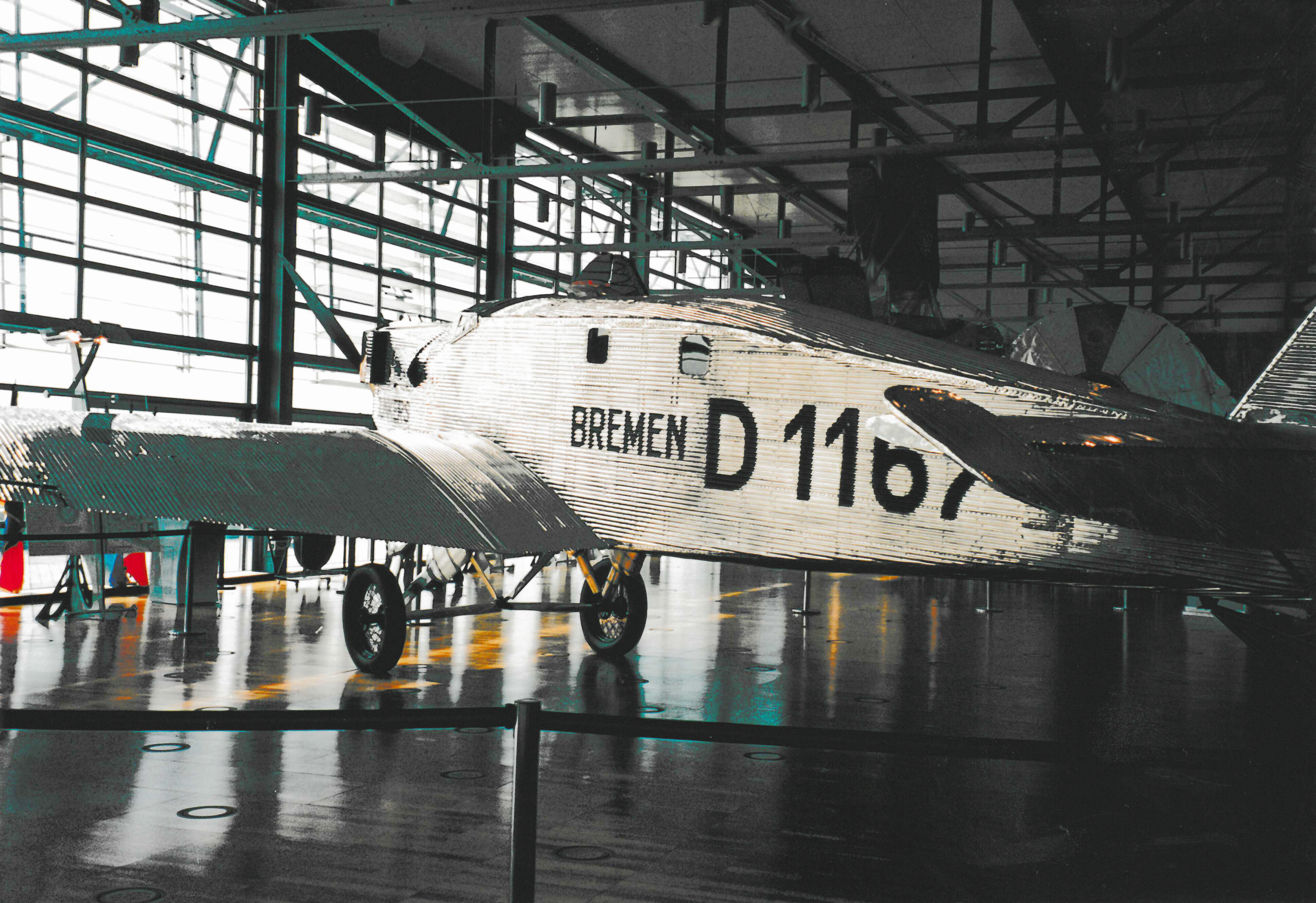
The W33 Bremen aircraft of the atlantic crossing

=== Civil operators ===
Brazil

- Syndicato Condor

Canada

- Canadian Airways

China

- Eurasia

Colombia

- SCADTA One registered as C-33, sold to Colombian Air Force in 1932.

Germany

- Deutsche Luft Hansa

Iceland
One on civil register W.33d, "Súlan" (The Gannet)
Japan
Two on civil register.
Sweden
Three on civil register.
Soviet Union

- Deruluft
- Dobrolyot operated 7
- TsARB (Центральная авиационная ремонтная база – Central aviation repair base) operated 10

=== Military operators ===
Colombia

- Colombian Air Force operated 1 W 33 from 1932 to 1939, acquired from SCADTA

Ethiopia

- Ethiopian Air Force operated 1 W 33c from 1929 to 1936

Germany

- Luftwaffe

Iran

- Imperial Iranian Air Force operated 3 W 33d from 1929 to 1943.

Mongolia

- Mongolian People's Army Air Force operated 5 aircraft from 1931.

Sweden

- Swedish Air Force operated 1 W 33g from 1933 to 1938 and 2 W 34h from 1934 to 1953.

Soviet Union

- Soviet Air Force operated 25

== Specifications (Landplane) ==
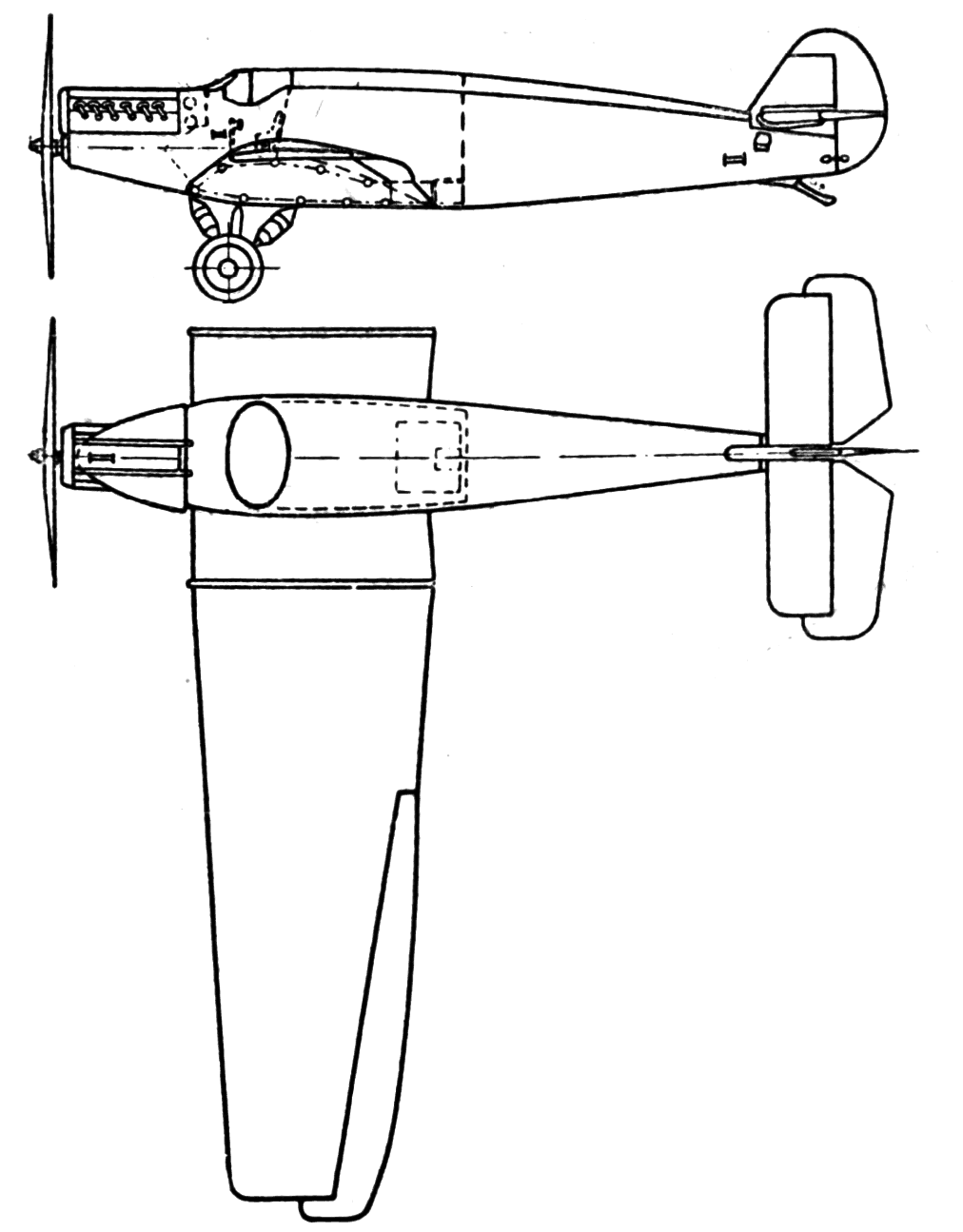
Junkers W 33 'Bremen' 2-view drawing from L'Aérophile May,1928

Data from Junkers: an aircraft album No.3

General characteristics

- Crew: Two
- Capacity: cargo hold volume 15.7 m^{3} (550 cu ft)
- Length: 10.5 m (34 ft 5 in)
- Wingspan: 17.75 m (58 ft 3 in)
- Height: 3.53 m (11 ft 7 in)
- Wing area: 43 m^{2} (460 sq ft)
- Airfoil: Göttingen 256
- Empty weight: 1,220 kg (2,690 lb)
- Max takeoff weight: 2,500 kg (5,512 lb) * Maximum Load: 830 kg (1,830 lb)
- Powerplant: 1 × Junkers L5 6-cylinder water-cooled in-line piston engine, 228 kW (306 hp)
- Propellers: 2-bladed fixed-pitch propeller

Performance

- Maximum speed: 180 km/h (110 mph, 97 kn)
- Cruise speed: 150 km/h (93 mph, 81 kn)
- Range: 1,000 km (620 mi, 540 nmi)
- Service ceiling: 4,300 m (14,100 ft)
