= Ehrenfried Günther Freiherr von Hünefeld =

German aviation pioneer

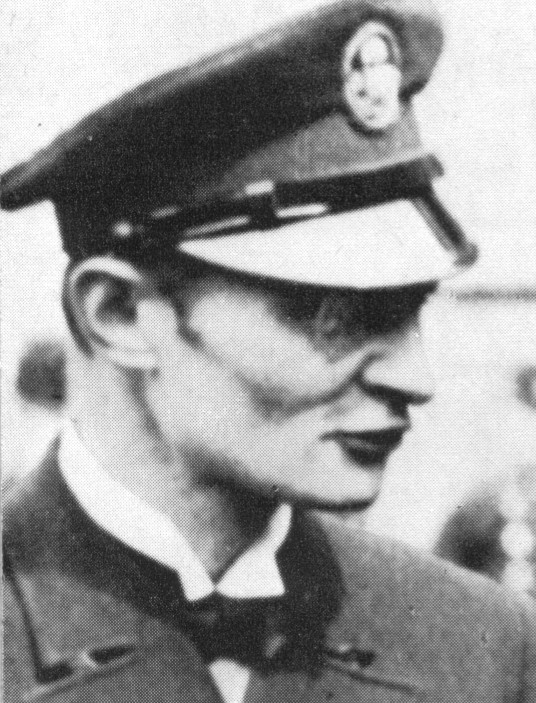
- Freiherr von Hünefeld
- Born: 1 May 1892; Königsberg, East Prussia, German Empire
- Died: 5 February 1929 (aged 36); Berlin, Germany
- Resting place: Landeseigener Friedhof Berlin-Steglitz
- Occupation: Aviator
- Known for: First transatlantic flight from East to West

Ehrenfried Günther Freiherr von Hünefeld (1 May 1892 – 5 February 1929) was a German aviation pioneer and initiator of the first transatlantic aeroplane flight from East to West.

== Early life ==
Hünefeld was born in Königsberg, East Prussia, the son of the owner of Braxeinswalde near Preußisch Eylau, where he grew up. He was blind in his left eye and near-sighted in his right, and his childhood was characterized by several serious diseases. After attending school in Berlin, he studied at Berlin University and came in contact with the first flight pioneers at Berlin's Johannisthal Air Field. At the beginning of World War I, he tried to join the German Air Service as a volunteer but was rejected due to his poor health. After that, he volunteered again as a motorcyclist and was wounded in September 1914 in Flanders, which led to a shortened left leg. Due to his handicaps, he could not return to service and joined the German Diplomatic Service, serving in Sofia, Constantinople, and as an Imperial Vice Consul in the Netherlands. After the end of World War I, he stayed in the Netherlands for one and a half years with the German Crown Prince Wilhelm, before returning to Germany, where he worked as a spokesman for the Norddeutscher Lloyd shipping company in Bremen.

== First east-west transatlantic flight ==
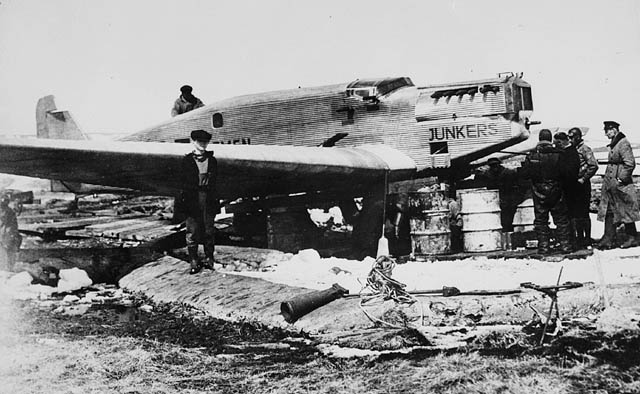
The Bremen after the transatlantic crossing

After Charles Lindbergh crossed the Atlantic from West to East in May 1927, the idea of flying in the opposite direction, which is more difficult because of the prevailing winds, became more and more popular. In 1927 Hünefeld bought two Junkers W 33 aircraft from the Junkers company in Dessau, naming them after the two Norddeutscher Lloyd flagships SS Bremen and SS Europa (unlikely as they did not exist at the time). His plans were supported by Hugo Junkers and Hermann Köhl, a World War I pilot and head of the Deutsche Luft Hansa Nightflight Branch.

After some test flights, and breaking the record for flight duration, Hünefeld and Köhl flew to Baldonnel, Ireland, where they met James C. Fitzmaurice, the Irish Air Corps Commandant of the Baldonnel Airodrome. On 12 April 1928, these three left Baldonnel in the Bremen and crossed the Atlantic Ocean, landing at Greenly Island on the south coast of Labrador in the Dominion of Newfoundland. Even though they failed to reach their original goal, New York City, they were the first to cross the Atlantic from Europe to America. By a special act of the Congress of the United States on 2 May 1928, Hünefeld and his two companions were awarded the Distinguished Flying Cross.

== Round-the-world flight attempt ==
On 18 September 1928, von Hünefeld and Swedish pilot Karl Gunnar Lindner took off from Berlin in the Europa in an attempt to fly around the world. In Bushire, Iran, they met Friedrich Karl von Koenig-Warthausen who went on to complete the first solo circumnavigation principally by air.

After they arrived in Tokyo on 20 October, the flight was abandoned because of poor weather conditions and Hünefeld's declining health.

Hünefeld died in February 1929 in Berlin from stomach cancer and is buried in the Landeseigener Friedhof Berlin-Steglitz cemetery.

== Literature ==
- Kohl, Hermann (1928). The Three Musketeers Of The Air. Putnam.
- Walter, Friedrich (1929). Trutz Tod – Des jungen Hünefeld Werden und Weg. Ernte-Verlag Potsdam.
- Walter, Friedrich (1930). Hünefeld – Ein Leben der Tat. Ernte-Verlag Potsdam.
- Hofbauer, Michael; Leder, Dieter; Schmelzle, Peter (2003). Die Welt der Überflieger – 75 Jahre Nordatllantikflug Ost-West. Deutsche Post AG.
- Hotson, Fred W (1996). Die Bremen. NARA-Verlag. ISBN 3-925671-22-6.
- Blendermann, Karl-August (1995). Atlantikflug D 1167. Verlag Hauschild. ISBN 3-929902-71-0.
