= James Fitzmaurice =

Irish aviation pioneer

James Fitzmaurice DFC
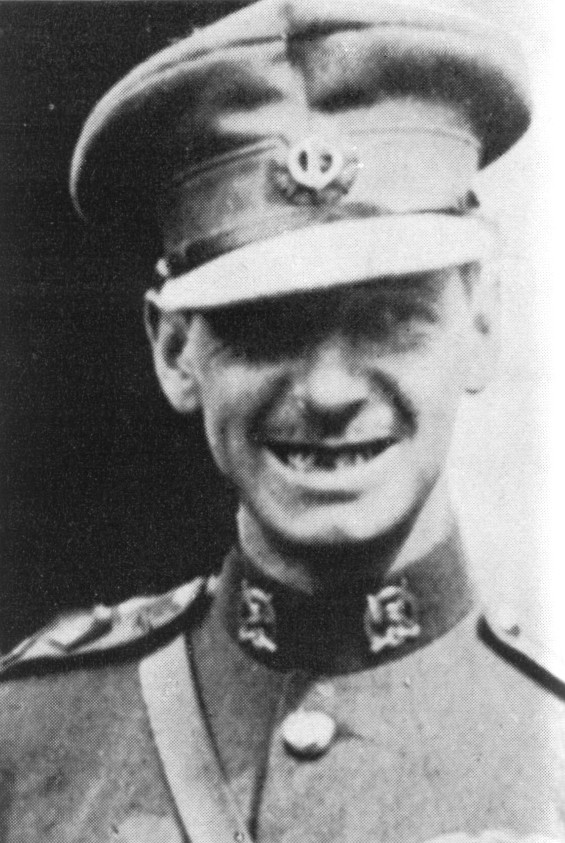
- James Fitzmaurice
- Born: James Michael Christopher Fitzmaurice; 6 January 1898; Dublin, Ireland
- Died: 26 September 1965 (aged 67); Dublin, Ireland
- Spouse: Violet "Bill" Clarke (m. 1919)
- Children: 1
- Military career
- Allegiance: Britain (1916–1921); Ireland (1921–1965)
- Branch: British Army; Royal Air Force; Irish Air Corps
- Rank: RAF: Lieutenant; Irish Air Corps: Colonel
- Units: 17th Lancers; Liverpool Irish; No. 25 Squadron RAF
- Commands: Officer Commanding Irish Air Corps
- Conflicts: Battle of the Somme (1916)
- Awards: Distinguished Flying Cross (United States)
- Other work: Insurance salesman

James Michael Christopher Fitzmaurice DFC (6 January 1898 – 26 September 1965) was an Irish aviation pioneer. He was a member of the crew of the Bremen, which made the first successful trans-Atlantic aircraft flight from East to West on 12–13 April 1928.

== Early life ==
Fitzmaurice was born in Dublin, Ireland on 6 January 1898. His parents were Michael Fitzmaurice and Mary Agnes O'Riordan. The family resided at 35 Mountjoy Cottages on Dublin's North Circular Road.

On 23 May 1902, at the age of four, Fitzmaurice moved with his parents to a house on Dublin Road, Portlaoise, Ireland. Fitzmaurice attended St. Mary's, a Christian Brothers School in Maryborough (Portlaoise) until shortly before his 16th birthday.

In 1914 he joined the National Volunteers. Later that year, he enlisted in the Cadet Company of the 7th Battalion of the Leinsters. He was then 16 years of age although the required minimum age was 19. Fitzmaurice was taken out by his father for being underage.

== World War I ==
In 1915, Fitzmaurice enlisted in the British Army, 17th Lancers (a cavalry unit). He was sent to France, was wounded, and was twice recommended for a commission. He arrived in France circa May 1916. He was then posted to another English unit, the 7th Battalion of the Queen's Royal (West Surrey) Regiment of Foot as an acting sergeant. It was part of the 55th Brigade in the British 55th (West Lancashire) Division. In July 1916, he fought in the Battle of the Somme.

On his 19th birthday in January 1917, Fitzmaurice held the rank of Corporal, was an acting Sergeant, and commanded Platoon No. 13 of D Company, 7th Queen's. He was approved for a commission in May. On 8 June, Fitzmaurice left for England "to take up commission". He was sent for training to Cadet College and graduated to the 8th (Irish) Battalion, King's (Liverpool Regiment) as a Second Lieutenant on 28 November 1917. Fitzmaurice was then posted to the School of Military Aeronautics at Reading. On 1 June 1918, Fitzmaurice began his "practical flying training" at Eastbourne Aerodrome. On 28 October 1918, having completed his elementary training at Eastbourne, Fitzmaurice was posted to the No. 1 School of Fighting and Aerial Gunnery at Marske-by-the-Sea, near Middlesbrough. He completed his training as a fighter pilot and was posted to sail to France on 11 November 1918, the day that the Armistice with Germany became effective. His sailing was cancelled when the Armistice was announced.

== After the war ==
Fitzmaurice married Violet "Bill" Clarke on his 21st birthday. He continued to serve in the Royal Air Force, flying the mails with 110 Squadron. He served in the "Army of Occupation" until 1919. In May 1919, he was selected to undertake the first-night mail flight (Folkestone to Boulogne). In 1919, he was selected for a Cape to Cairo flight (which did not materialize). From September to November 1919, Fitzmaurice commanded the 6th Wing Working Party of the RAF. He was assigned the task of removing useful material from six aerodromes which had been deactivated. In December he was demobilized and spent most of the following 18 months selling insurance for the North British and Mercantile Insurance Company.

In about May 1921, Patricia Fitzmaurice was born. She was the only child of Violet and James Fitzmaurice. Fitzmaurice was recalled in May 1921 after 18 months and was attached to 25 Squadron. He accepted a Short Service Commission for four to six years. In August 1921 Fitzmaurice resigned his RAF commission.

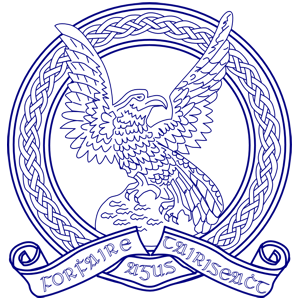
Irish Air Corps crest

Sometime during his service in the RAF, Fitzmaurice adopted the accent used by English officers. He apparently retained this distinctively non-Irish accent for the remainder of his life. His new accent may have helped his career in the RAF.

In February 1922, Fitzmaurice joined the Irish National Army's Air Service following the formation of the Irish Free State. Early in 1923 he was promoted to captain. On 25 October 1925, he was promoted to Acting Commandant and was appointed second-in-command of the Irish Air Corps, with headquarters in Baldonnel. He was later promoted to Commandant on 1 September 1927.

Fitzmaurice made his first attempt to fly the Atlantic in 1927, when in the Princess Xenia (aircraft) (a Fokker F.VIIa aircraft) piloted by Captain Robert Henry McIntosh, who got financial backing from an American millionaire William Bateman Leeds and his co-financier Captain Anthony (Wilfred Heyman) Joynson-Wreford. Captain Joynson-Wreford was to have been the navigator on the flight but unfortunately had to stand down due to the recurrence of an old war injury. Having received the meteorological forecast indicating, that even though the first 200 miles off the Irish coast were poor, the rest of the route to America was clear, so they decided to proceed with the attempt. A large crowd watched their take off from Baldonnel at 1:30 p.m., however, the weather off the coast of Galway was turbulent and got worse until visibility was virtually nil. It seemed suicidal to continue so they turned back and landed at Beale Strand near Ballybunion in County Kerry. Fitzmaurice was co-pilot of the Xenia with Maurice W. Piercey for the five and a half-hour flight that only took them 300 miles off the Irish coast.

== Bremen flight ==
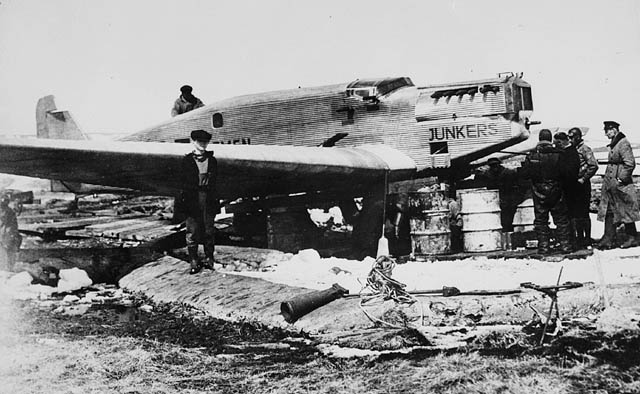
The Bremen after the transatlantic crossing

On 12–13 April 1928, Fitzmaurice flew in the crew of the Bremen on the first transatlantic aircraft flight from East to West. The crew consisted of:

- Captain Hermann Köhl (1888–1938), pilot
- Commandant James Fitzmaurice, (1898–1965) co-pilot
- Baron Ehrenfried Günther Freiherr von Hünefeld (1892–1929), owner

Köhl made a "perfect three-point landing" on a shallow, ice-covered, water reservoir (which James called a "lagoon") for the lighthouse at Greenly Island, Canada. Just as the Bremen came to a stop, it broke through the ice. The tail then projected about 20 feet (6 m) into the air. Everybody got wet but everybody was safe.

== After the flight ==
On 2 May 1928, the 70th United States Congress authorized the President, Calvin Coolidge, to confer the United States Distinguished Flying Cross on the fliers. In recognition of their trans-Atlantic flight achievement, Fitzmaurice and his two companions were bestowed the Freedom of the City of Dublin on 30 June 1928.

After the successful flight, Fitzmaurice was promoted from Major to Colonel, but he resigned from the Service on 2 February 1929. He was divorced in January 1931. Fitzmaurice met Hitler in 1933, following an invitation extended shortly after the Reichstag elected Hitler as Chancellor, Fitzmaurice was reportedly present to witness the Reichstag fire.

During much of the 1930s, Fitzmaurice lived in New York. He spent World War II in London, where he ran a club for veteran pilots. After the war, he returned to Ireland.

On 1 June 1955, Fitzmaurice was the guest of honour when Lufthansa inaugurated airline service between Shannon and New York.

Fitzmaurice died in Dublin on 26 September 1965.

== Legacy ==
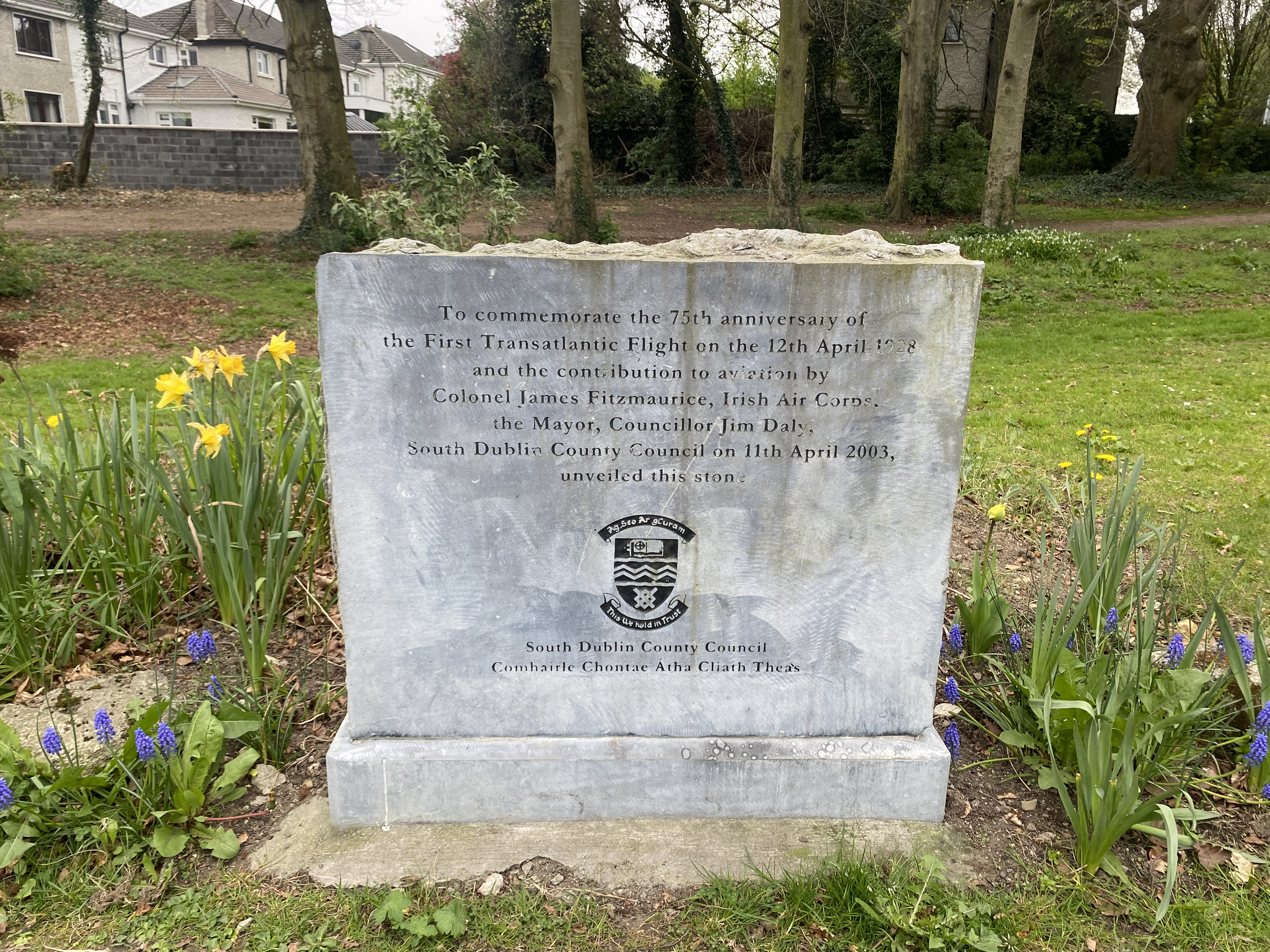
James Fitzmaurice's first transatlantic flight memorial at Rathcoole

There are streets named for Fitzmaurice in four German cities: Bremen (at the airport), Cologne, Ulm and Pfaffenhofen an der Roth. In addition, streets have been named for him in cities in a number of English-speaking countries, including in Wagga Wagga, Australia.

The Fitzmaurice Flying School was opened in Baldonnel in February 1996 and in April the restaurant in the Kingswood County House Hotel was named after the aviator. In 1998, for the 70th anniversary of the famous flight, a short film was made profiling the life of Fitzmaurice with dramatic reconstruction of the flight. An Post issued a postage stamp commemorating Fitzmaurice as part of a series of four stamps of Irish aviation pioneers in the same year when his daughter, Patricia, unveiled a bronze bust of Fitzmaurice in the foyer of Portlaoise County Hall. Also in 1998, Dublin County Council named the new link road between Saggart and Rathcoole, two villages that are close to the Irish Air Corps headquarters at Baldonnel, as Fitzmaurice Road.

== See also ==
- List of people on the postage stamps of Ireland
- P. A. Ó Síocháin
