= Hermann Köhl =

German aviator

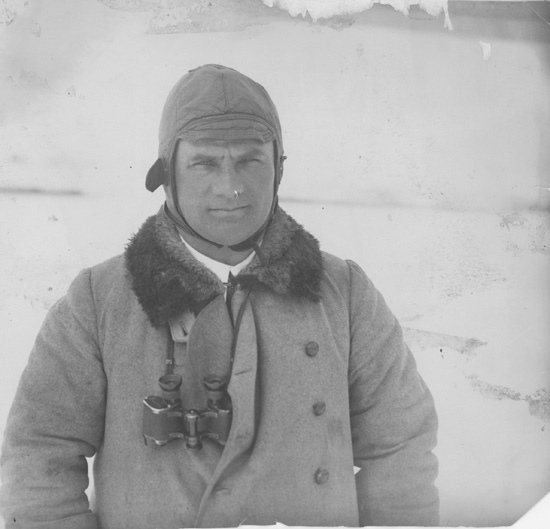
- Born: 15 April 1888; Neu-Ulm, Bavaria
- Died: 7 October 1938 (aged 50); Munich, Germany
- Resting place: Pfaffenhofen an der Roth, Bavaria
- Occupation: Aviator
- Known for: First transatlantic flight from East to West, April 1928

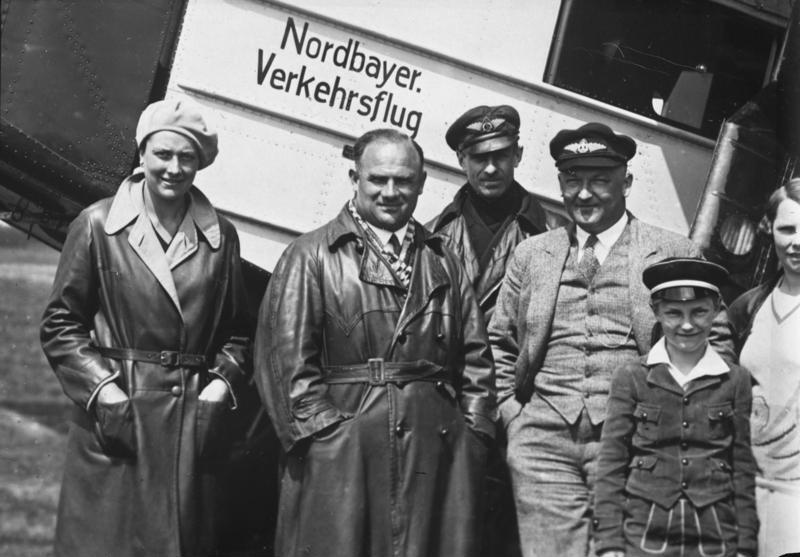
Köhl (center) in May 1930

Hermann Köhl (15 April 1888 – 7 October 1938) was a German aviation pioneer and pilot of the first transatlantic flight by a fixed-wing aircraft from east to west.

== Biography ==
Köhl was born in Neu-Ulm, Bavaria, as one of eight children. At the age of 19, he joined the German Imperial Army to become an officer like his father. At the beginning of World War I he was a Lieutenant in the Württembergisches Pionier-Bataillon Nr.13 ("13th Württemberg Pioneer Battalion"). After being wounded in the legs, which disqualified him from further service in the engineers, he volunteered to join the German Army Air Service. He became a pilot and later a commander of a Bomber Squadron and received the Pour le Mérite in 1918. He crashed his aircraft behind enemy lines and was captured and held as a POW in France but managed to escape and return to Germany. After the end of World War I, he worked for the German Police and for the Reichswehr, but in 1925, he transferred to civil aviation and became the head of the Deutsche Luft Hansa Nightflight Branch in 1926.

=== Transatlantic flight and later years ===
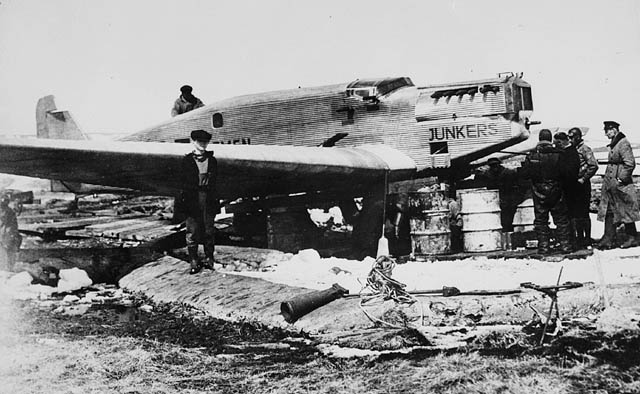
The Bremen after the transatlantic crossing

After Charles Lindbergh crossed the Atlantic from west to east in May 1927, the idea of flying in the opposite direction, which is more difficult because of the prevailing winds, became more and more popular. In 1927, Ehrenfried Günther Freiherr von Hünefeld bought two Junkers W 33 aircraft from the Junkers company in Dessau, naming them after the two Norddeutscher Lloyd flagships SS Bremen and SS Europa. His plans were supported by Hugo Junkers. After performing some test flights and breaking the record for flight duration, Hünefeld and Köhl flew to Baldonnel, Ireland, where they met James C. Fitzmaurice, the Irish Air Corps Commandant of the Baldonnel Aerodrome. On 12 April 1928, these three left Baldonnel in the Bremen and crossed the Atlantic Ocean, landing at Greenly Island on the south coast of Labrador, Canada. Even though they missed their intended destination, New York City, they were the first to cross the Atlantic by fixed-wing aircraft from Europe to America, almost nine years after the initial success at an east-west crossing by a British rigid airship.

For his feat, Köhl was awarded the Distinguished Flying Cross by Calvin Coolidge, the President of the United States.

By 1935, Köhl had been pushed out of German aviation circles. American journalist William L. Shirer, who befriended Koehl, wrote in his diary (later published as Berlin Diary) that "he is one of the few men in Germany with enough courage not to knuckle down to Göring and the Nazis. As a result he is completely out, having even lost his job with Lufthansa. A fervent Catholic and a man of strong character, he prefers to retire to his little farm in the south of Germany rather than curry Nazi favour. He is one of a very few."

Köhl died in Munich in 1938 from a kidney disease that he had contracted during his flights. He was buried in Pfaffenhofen an der Roth.

== Tributes ==
- A German Luftwaffe Airbus A310 MRTT medevac aircraft and the Bundeswehr barracks of the Transporthubschrauber-Regiment 30 in Niederstetten are named after Hermann Köhl. There is also a street in Bremen, near the airport, that is named after him.
- A street in Massapequa Park, a suburb on Long Island, New York, is named after Köhl. The street was once home to Fitzmaurice Flying Park.

== Literature ==
- Köhl, Hermann (1928). The Three Musketeers Of The Air. Putnam.
- Hofbauer, Michael; Leder, Dieter; Schmelzle, Peter (2003). Die Welt der Überflieger – 75 Jahre Nordatllantikflug Ost-West. Deutsche Post AG.
- Hotson, Fred W (1996). Die Bremen. NARA-Verlag. ISBN 3-925671-22-6.
- Blendermann, Karl-August (1995). Atlantikflug D 1167. Verlag Hauschild. ISBN 3-929902-71-0.
