= C2 =

C2 or a derivative (C-2, C^{2}, etc.) may refer to:

== Mathematics and physics ==
- C_{2}, one of the common notations for the cyclic group of order 2
- C^{2} differentiability class
- C^{2} or $\Complex^2$, the complex coordinate plane
- c^{2}, the square of the speed of light (in the mass–energy equivalence formula)
- c^{2}, hypotenuse squared in the Pythagorean theorem
- C2 (space group), three-dimensional space group number 5

== Biology ==
- C2 domain, a protein structural domain
- C2 regulatory sequence for the insulin gene
- Apolipoprotein C2, a human apolipoprotein
- In human anatomy, C2 may refer to:
  - Cervical vertebra 2, the axis, one of the cervical vertebrae of the vertebral column
  - Cervical spinal nerve 2
- Chlorophyll c2, a form of chlorophyll
- Complement component 2
- Procyanidin C2, a plant phenolic compound
- Prodelphinidin C2, a plant phenolic compound
- Vitamin C2
- the ATC code for Antihypertensives, a subgroup of the Anatomical Therapeutic Chemical Classification System
- C_{2} fragments, one of the types of products of catabolism pathways
- Haplogroup C-M217, also known as C2, a Human Y-chromosome DNA haplogroup

== Chemistry ==
- C_{2}, Diatomic carbon, a molecule made of two carbon atoms
- C2=, ethylene, a two carbon alkene

== Codes or abbreviations ==
C2 may be a code or abbreviation for:

- C^{2} Aquarii, a star
- C^{2} Centauri, a star
- C2 (Code Geass), an anime character
- C2 explosive, a form of plastic explosive
- C2 pylon, a type of high voltage pylon
- C2 radio class, a class in FM broadcasting in America
- C2 (classification), a para-cycling classification
- Group C2, the secondary class of Group C sports car racing
- Nimrod NRA/C2, a 1982 Group C racing car
- C2, an international standard paper size defined in ISO 216 (458×648 mm)
- C2, a level in the Common European Framework of Reference for Languages
- C2, the NRS social grade between C1 and D
- C2s, substances listed in Schedule II of the Controlled Substances Act in the United States
- Command and control, the exercise of authority by a commanding officer over military forces in the accomplishment of a mission
- Air Luxor IATA airline code
- C2 Pictures, a film company related to Carolco Pictures
- Bill C-2, various legislation of the Parliament of Canada
- C2, or C_{2} a note-octave in music, aka Low C

== Computing ==
- C2, a computer security class, defined in the Trusted Computer System Evaluation Criteria
- C2, a bytecode compiler that is part of the HotSpot virtual machine implementation
- C2 (protocol), a 1985 Commodore file transfer protocol
- C2 error, a read error of a compact disc
- C2.com or WikiWikiWeb, the first user-editable website
- C2 (consulting firm), an initialism for, and aka Cunningham and Cunningham, a technology consulting firm founded by Ward Cunningham
- Cryptomeria cipher, a cipher used in digital rights management
- Command and control (malware)
- Codec 2, speech compression codec.

== Transportation and space ==
- C2 class Melbourne tram
- Bavarian C II (Ostbahn), an 1862 German steam locomotive
- Bavarian C II.1, an 1857 German steam locomotive
- Bavarian C II.2, an 1861 German steam locomotive
- Chevrolet Corvette (C2), the generation of the Chevrolet Corvette produced between 1962 and 1967
- Citroën C2, a car produced by Citroën in 2004
- Cluster II (spacecraft), an ESA space mission
- Ford C2 platform, an automobile platform produced by Ford since 2018
- GNR Class C2, a British 4-4-2 steam locomotive class
- LNER Class C2, classified C1 during GNR ownership
- Kawasaki C2, a bike
- London Buses route C2
- LB&SCR C2 class, an 1893 British 0-6-0 steam locomotive
- Circumferential Road 2 or C-2, an arterial road of Manila, Philippines
- Saf-T-Liner C2, a school bus built by Thomas Built Buses
- Saturn C-2, a 1960 conceptual American launch vehicle
- Type C2 ship, a type of all-purpose cargo ship
- C2 (yacht), a luxury motor yacht
- Central Circular Route (Shuto Expressway) in Tokyo, Japan
- Mei-Nikan Expressway, route C2 in Nagoya, Japan

== Military and aviation ==
- Command and control, the exercise of authority and direction by a commanding officer
- C-2 (poison), developed in the Poison laboratory of the Soviet secret services
- C2A1, Squad Automatic Weapon variant of the FN FAL formerly in Canadian Service
- ACAZ C.2, a Belgian prototype fighter aircraft of the 1920s
- AEG C.II, a German World War II armed reconnaissance aircraft
- Aeronca C-2, an American airplane
- AGO C.II, a German reconnaissance biplane of World War I
- Cierva C.2, a 1921 Spanish experimental autogyro
- DFW C.II, a World War I German reconnaissance aircraft
- Fokker C-2, the American military version of the Fokker F.VII aircraft
- C-2 Greyhound, the Grumman cargo aircraft of the United States Navy
- HMS C2, a C-class submarine of the British Royal Navy
- Kawasaki C-2, a military transport aircraft
- LFG Roland C.II, a 1915 advanced German reconnaissance aircraft
- LVG C.II, a 1910s German two-seat reconnaissance biplane
- Spanish submarine C-2, a C-class submarine of the Spanish Navy
- USS C-2 (SS-13), a C-class submarine of the United States Navy
- USS Charleston (C-2), a protected cruiser of the United States Navy

== Other ==
- C2, UEFA Cup Winners' Cup in football, later merged with UEFA Cup (now UEFA Europa League)
- C2 Pictures, a film studio
- C-2 visa, a nonimmigrant visa which allows individuals to travel to and from the headquarters of the United Nations
- Coca-Cola C2, a soft drink launched by The Coca-Cola Company in 2004
- Conduit 2, a 2011 first-person shooter video game
- AEW Continental Classic, a professional wrestling tournament

== See also ==
- CO2
- CII (disambiguation)
- 2C (disambiguation)
