= Super chennai =

Super Chennai
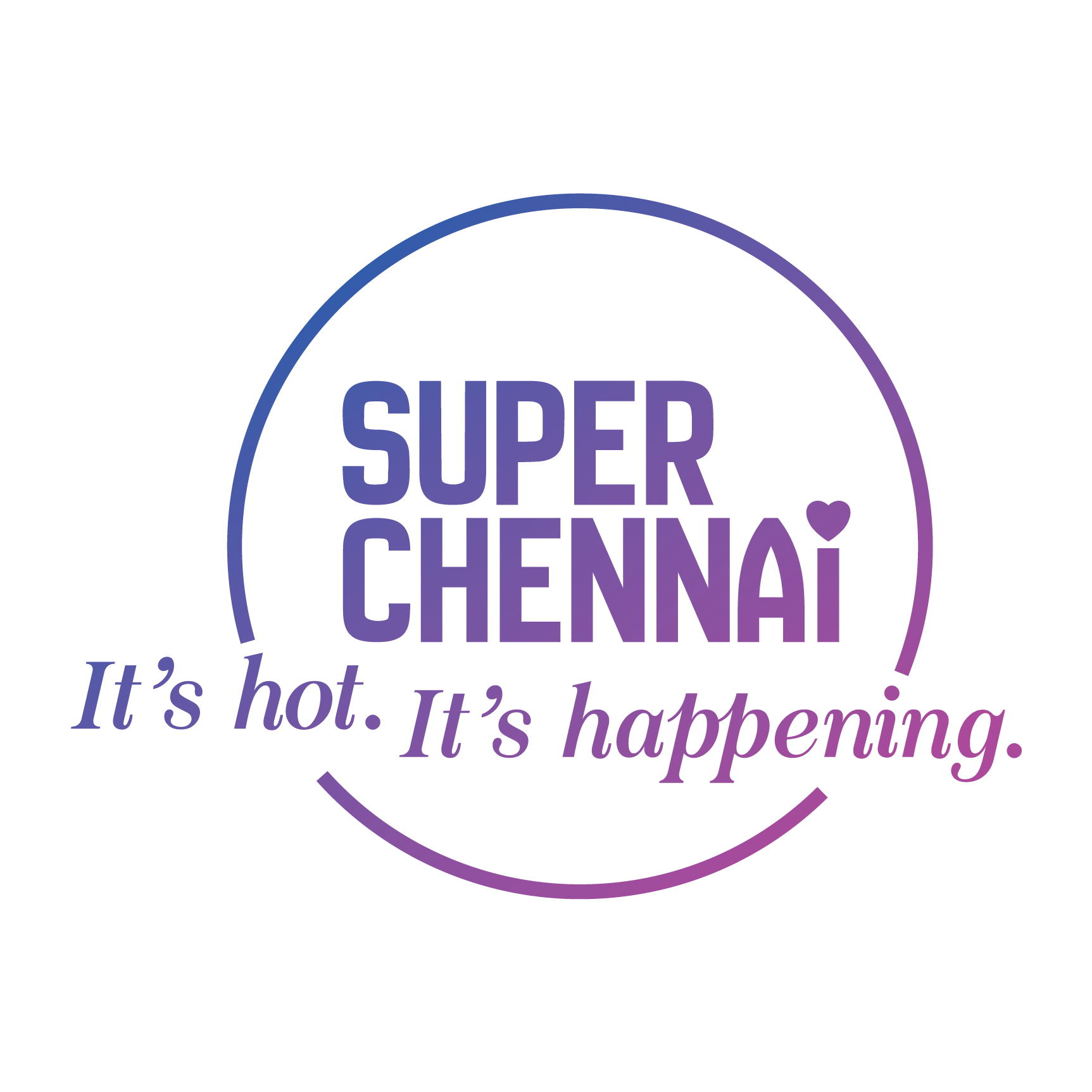
- Official logo of Super Chennai
- Founded: 2024–25
- Type: Not-for-profit civic movement
- Headquarters: Chennai, Tamil Nadu, India
- Key people: Ranjeeth Rathod (Managing Director); Karthik Nagappan (Chief Executive Officer)
- Parent organization: CREDAI Chennai
- Website: superchennai.com

Super Chennai is a citizen-led city branding and civic engagement movement based in Chennai, Tamil Nadu, India. Launched in 2025, it is backed by CREDAI (Confederation of Real Estate Developers' Associations of India) Chennai chapter and operates as a not-for-profit initiative. Its stated mission is to propel Chennai into the world's top 100 most livable cities, as ranked by BestCities.com, within three years of its founding.

The movement is widely described as India's first citizen-led city branding campaign, and has been recognised for pioneering a model of participatory urban storytelling that combines cultural identity, civic pride, and digital outreach. By November 2025, the initiative had amassed over one million social media followers and recorded more than 1.6 million visits to its dedicated website.

== Background ==
Chennai, the capital of Tamil Nadu, has long been regarded as one of India's most economically significant cities, housing major automotive, technology, and manufacturing industries. Despite its economic weight, the city has historically underperformed in global livability and city reputation rankings relative to Indian peers such as Bengaluru and Mumbai. As of the mid-2020s, no Indian city from the south featured prominently in the upper tiers of international city indices. Bengaluru ranked 29th on BestCities.com's global livability list of cities with populations over a million, while Mumbai ranked 40th and Delhi 54th. Chennai did not feature in the upper rankings.

The perception gap (a city that performs well economically but is perceived as conservative, undervalued, or inaccessible by outsiders) formed the key context for the Super Chennai initiative. Its founders identified that the city's story was not being told on the global stage with sufficient ambition or emotional resonance.

== Founding and Launch ==
The Super Chennai concept was pitched to and accepted by CREDAI Chennai in October–November 2024. The initiative was conceived and led by Ranjeeth Rathod, who became the managing director of the movement. The initial phase was framed as an awareness campaign to build the Super Chennai brand identity before transitioning to deeper civic engagement.

=== Logo Launch at FAIRPRO 2025 ===
The Super Chennai logo was officially launched by Tamil Nadu Chief Minister M. K. Stalin at FAIRPRO 2025, the annual real estate exhibition organised by CREDAI Chennai. The Chief Minister's participation was seen as an endorsement of the city's forward-looking vision and an expression of the state government's alignment with the initiative's goals.

=== Website and Digital Platform ===
The dedicated website superchennai.com was unveiled on 17–18 July 2025, making Chennai the first Indian city to launch a dedicated citizen-led urban digital platform of this kind. The platform was designed to go beyond the conventional promotional microsite model. It integrates community voices, real-time city updates, hyperlocal content, civic information, and cultural narratives into a unified digital experience. The site is home to contests, city content, and the initiative's overarching mission.

A feature called Pointcast, developed by brand evangelist Aditya Swaminathan, was described as the city's "heartbeat," providing real-time civic updates to residents and visitors.

== City Branding Campaign ==
In July 2025, Super Chennai launched what it described as India's first citizen-led city branding campaign. The campaign ran across television, print, digital, radio, outdoor, airport out-of-home media, and bus wraps, a multi-platform rollout designed to maximise reach across all demographics.

The campaign was conceptualised by Blue Noodles, a Chennai-based marketing collaboratory, produced by Happy Unicorn, and directed by Avinash Hari. All three production partners were Chennai-based entities, in keeping with the initiative's emphasis on locally rooted storytelling.

=== Television Commercials ===
At the heart of the campaign were five television commercials that sought to reintroduce Chennai to both domestic and international audiences. The films were described as high-energy and youthful in their storytelling, breaking common stereotypes about Chennai as a conservative, temple-town city and instead highlighting its duality: a city equally at home in its classical traditions and its contemporary ambitions. The films spotlighted aspects of Chennai rarely seen in mainstream Indian media coverage of the city.

=== Celebrity Endorsements ===
The campaign secured endorsements from prominent Chennai-associated public figures, lending emotional weight and cultural credibility to the initiative. Endorsers included:

- Viswanathan Anand – Grandmaster and five-time World Chess Champion
- Jiiva – Tamil film actor
- Radhikaa Sarathkumar – Actress and film producer

== Organisation and Structure ==
Super Chennai operates as a not-for-profit civic movement. At launch, the board consisted primarily of CREDAI members, with the stated intention of expanding representation over time to include voices from technology, manufacturing, healthcare, hospitality, and cultural institutions.

The first Chief Operating Officer (COO) at launch was media sales veteran MM Charly, who subsequently left the organisation. In late 2025, Ranjeeth Rathod announced that the initiative would transition from its awareness phase into a structured engagement phase from 1 January 2026, led by a newly appointed CEO.

On 2 December 2025, Karthik Nagappan was appointed chief executive officer of Super Chennai, with the appointment publicly announced on 15 December 2025. Nagappan previously served as Assistant Vice President at Unifi Capital Pvt. Ltd., and brings a background spanning finance, brand building, and urban storytelling. Earlier in his career, he played a key role in notable Chennai-focused campaigns at The Times of India, including the viral "Namma Chennai Chance-ey Illa" and "Happy Streets" initiatives, and at The Hindu, where he was associated with the "Made of Chennai" campaign.

The engagement phase was designed around structured interactions with government departments, media institutions, and industry associations including FICCI, CII, and NASSCOM.

=== Icon of the Month ===
Super Chennai runs a monthly recognition programme titled Icon of the Month, designed to celebrate individuals whose work has shaped Chennai's civic, cultural, and entrepreneurial life. Notable recipients include:

- C. K. Kumaravel, co-founder of Naturals Salon, honoured as the inaugural recipient for his contribution to women's entrepreneurship and inclusive growth
- Aruna Sairam, Padma Shri-awarded Carnatic vocalist, honoured at the inaugural edition of Super Chennai Arattai (March 2026) for her contribution to music and Chennai's cultural identity
- Prof. V. Kamakoti, Director of IIT Madras, honoured as the March 2026 Icon of the Month
- Chinmayi Sripada, playback singer, recognised as Icon of the Month

=== Super Chennai Arattai ===
Super Chennai Arattai is a periodic interaction series launched in March 2026, designed as an up-close, informal platform where iconic personalities from arts, sports, business, cinema, literature, and public life engage directly with citizens and admirers. The inaugural edition featured Aruna Sairam, with the felicitation presented by C. K. Kumaravel. Seats are limited and curated, with registrations opened through Super Chennai's official platforms.

== Super Chennai Conclave ==
Super Chennai organised the Super Chennai Conclave, a civic summit that brought together senior government officials, urban planners, industry leaders, sustainability experts, and cultural stakeholders. The conclave served as a structured platform for gathering policy-level recommendations and citizen insights to inform the direction of the movement's civic agenda.

The conclave covered five thematic pillars aligned with the movement's vision for the city: Live, Visit, Work, Invest, and Innovate. Outputs from the conclave were subsequently incorporated into the Super Chennai Manifesto 2026.

== Super Chennai Manifesto 2026 ==
On 7 March 2026, Super Chennai unveiled the Super Chennai Manifesto 2026, a comprehensive civic blueprint formally titled Super Chennai Compact: For a Global, Resilient City. The document was described as a living civic framework, not a one-time declaration, intended to be pursued through ongoing policy engagement, working groups, and collaboration with government institutions.

The Manifesto is structured around six thematic pillars:

=== The Digitally Transparent City ===
Proposals under this pillar include opening data across all civic bodies, launching standardised corporation websites, publishing ward-level performance dashboards covering waste, roads, lighting, and grievance resolution, conducting quarterly public infrastructure audits, and enforcing time-bound project delivery with contractor accountability.

=== The Integrated Planning City ===
This pillar calls for deploying digital twins and AI-driven urban planning, adopting single integrated tenders for roads, drainage, and utilities to eliminate repeated road-digging, reforming Floor Space Index (FSI) norms along transit corridors for mixed-use vertical growth, and adopting a "30-minute city" mobility framework integrating bus, metro, and suburban rail networks with AI-driven traffic optimisation.

=== The Water-Secure and Climate-Resilient Coastal City ===
Key proposals include completing the stormwater drain network, fully separating sewage and stormwater lines, deploying AI-driven monsoon management systems, expanding reservoir and desalination capacity, and embedding flood-resilient zoning in all future development.

=== The Green Industrial and AI Capital ===
The Manifesto envisions Chennai as a globally competitive hub for artificial intelligence and deep technology, with mandates for 70% green power use in data centres, relocation of high-compute zones away from residential areas, and renewable energy-anchored industrial corridors.

=== The Deep-Tech, GCC and Startup Stronghold ===
This pillar proposes leveraging Tamil Nadu's Global Capability Centre (GCC) policy to position Chennai as India's leading GCC hub, establishing a state-backed fund-of-funds for local startup investment, and promoting "Chenn.ai" as Chennai's global technology identity.

=== Tourism, Culture and Global Storytelling ===
Proposals in this area include developing a 24-hour visitor economy, recognition of the East Coast Surf Corridor, streamlining film production permissions, and positioning Chennai's cultural identity and creative output on the global stage.

== Recognition and Milestones ==
Super Chennai is regarded as a pioneering model for citizen-driven place branding in India. Key milestones include:

- First Indian city to launch a citizen-led, dedicated urban branding website (July 2025)
- First city branding campaign in India to be conceptualised, produced, and directed entirely by Chennai-based creative agencies
- Over one million social media followers within approximately ten months of launch (November 2025)
- More than 1.6 million website visits and 1.5 lakh monthly active users by November 2025
- Super Chennai Manifesto 2026 unveiled at a civic summit attended by government officials, urban planners, and industry bodies (March 2026)

== Reception ==
The initiative has received broadly positive coverage from the Indian media and marketing industry. MxMIndia described it as gaining strong momentum while questioning whether the movement could sustain meaningful civic change over the long term, noting the significant ambition involved in moving a city of Chennai's size into the global top 100 livability rankings.

The campaign's focus on citizen participation and its refusal to rely solely on government machinery or real estate investment narrative has been cited as a distinguishing factor in a landscape where Indian city branding efforts have historically been government-driven or tourism-focused.

Critics have pointed to the commercial interests of the founding backer CREDAI, whose stated motivation included increasing property sales in the city, as a potential tension with the movement's citizen-first framing. Ranjeeth Rathod has acknowledged this context openly, arguing that commercial and civic benefit are not mutually exclusive: "If instead of 20,000 homes we sell 30,000 homes next year, not only will CREDAI benefit, the whole state will have benefited."
