= James DeWitt Hill =

American air mail pilot (1882–1927)

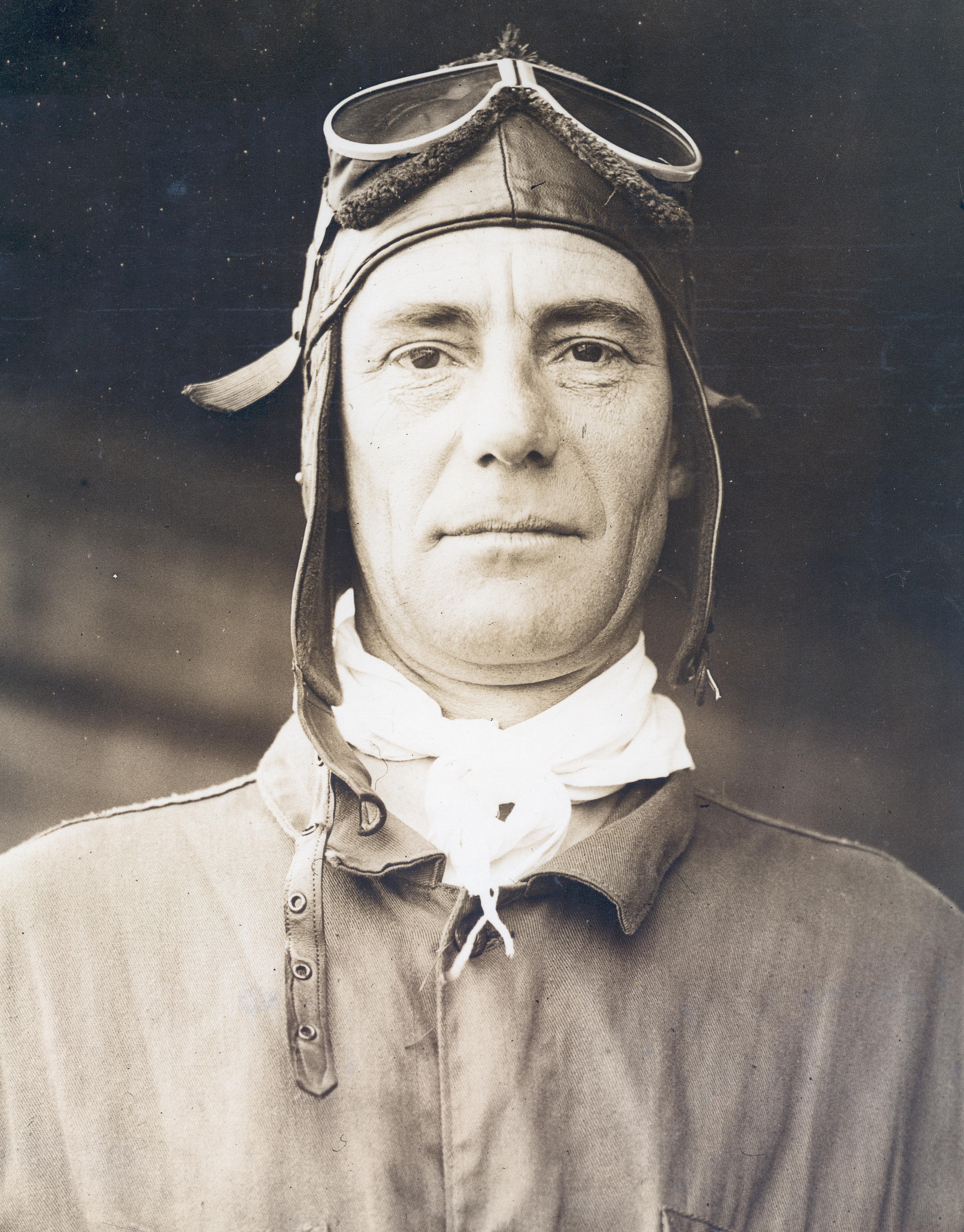
- Hill in 1924
- Born: James DeWitt Hill; 2 March 1882; Scottdale, Pennsylvania, U.S.
- Died: 7 September 1927 (aged 45); N Atlantic 960km E of Cape Race, Newfoundland, Canada
- Cause of death: Aircraft Crash – Old Glory
- Known for: Early air mail pilot
- Spouse: Unmarried
- Aviation career
- First flight: 1909?
- Flight license: 1912

James DeWitt Hill (2 March 1882 – 7 September 1927) was an early US air mail pilot, who died while attempting one of the first transatlantic flights, with Lloyd Wilson Bertaud in a Fokker F.VIIA monoplane named Old Glory.

== Early life and education ==
Hill was born and grew up in Scottdale, Pennsylvania, and graduated with honours from Scottdale High School. He studied mechanical engineering at Lafayette College, Easton, Pennsylvania, but he left the course after a year. He subsequently studied civil engineering at Cornell University, Ithaca, New York, but he was unable to complete that course because of ill health.

== Aviator ==
Hill appears to have had some experience of flying before he enrolled in autumn 1912 in the Glenn Curtiss Flying School, in order to study flying thoroughly. He was issued land plane certificate No. 234 by the Aero Club of America. Between 1915 and 1924, Hill pursued a career as an aircraft instructor, test pilot and aircraft sales representative in several different locations in the central and eastern United States.

== Air mail pilot ==
Hill joined the US Air Mail Service on 1 July 1924. On 1 July 1925, he was one of the pilots who inaugurated the first New York City to Chicago night air mail service.

== Attempted transatlantic flight ==
In spring 1927, Hill's fellow air mail pilot and friend Lloyd W. Bertaud was approached to be the co-pilot for an attempt at the first flight from New York to Paris, France, flying the Wright-Bellanca WB-2 Columbia. When Bertaud was displaced to make way for Charles A. Levine, the chairman of the board of directors of the Columbia Aircraft Corp, he sought an injunction to prevent Levine and pilot Clarence Chamberlain from attempting the flight. Although the injunction was lifted, this was only after Charles Lindbergh had made the first New York to Paris flight on 20–21 May 1927, thereby winning the Orteig Prize. Chamberlain and Levine subsequently flew Columbia from New York City to Eisleben in Germany on 4–6 June 1927.

Bertaud's elimination from the crew of Columbia spurred him to make his own attempt at a transatlantic flight, this time from New York to Rome, Italy, and Hill agreed to join him. William Randolph Hearst agreed to sponsor the attempt to publicize his newspaper, the New York Daily Mirror. The newspaper's editor, Philip A. Payne, accompanied the two pilots on the flight.

The three took off, with Hill at the controls, in Old Glory, a Fokker F.VIIA monoplane, from Old Orchard Beach, Maine, at 12.23 pm EST on 6 September 1927. The Old Glory had last been sighted by the steamship California at 11.57 pm, 563 km east of Cape Race. At 3.57 am and 4.03 am distress signals from the aircraft were received by radio; its estimated position was then 960 km east of Cape Race, Newfoundland. On 12 September, the SS Kyle found substantial amounts of wreckage from the aircraft, but no trace was ever found of Bertaud, Hill or Payne.

In 1928, the Ontario Surveyor General named a number of lakes in the northwest of the province to honour aviators who had perished during 1927, mainly in attempting transoceanic flights. These include Bertaud Lake (50.90°N 90.71°W), Hill Lake (50.56°N 90.77°W) and Payne Lake (50.85°N 90.54°W).

== See also ==
- List of people who disappeared mysteriously at sea
