= Aeroflot Flight 2723 =

1966 aviation accident

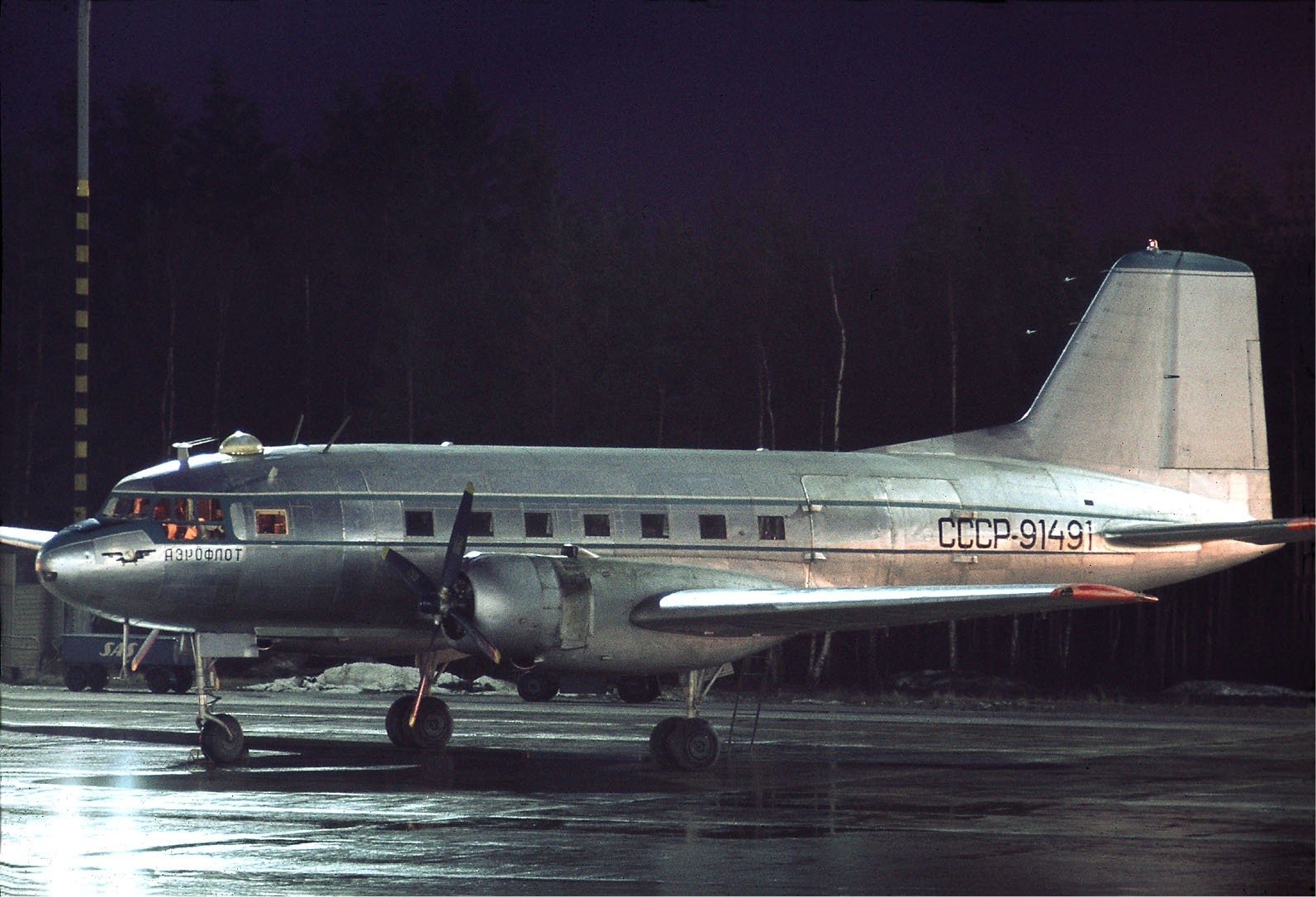
- An Ilyushin Il-14 similar to the one involved in the crash

Accident
- Date: 23 April 1966
- Summary: Unexplained double engine failure, ditching at sea
- Site: Caspian Sea, south of the Absheron Peninsula

Aircraft
- Aircraft type: Ilyushin Il-14P
- Operator: Aeroflot (Baku OJSC, Azerbaijan UGA)
- Registration: CCCP-61772
- Flight origin: Bina International Airport
- Stopover: Makhachkala Airport
- Destination: Saratov Airport
- Passengers: 28
- Crew: 5
- Fatalities: 33
- Survivors: 0

Aeroflot Flight 2723 was a Soviet domestic passenger flight from Bina International Airport to Makhachkala Airport. On 23 April 1966, the Ilyushin Il-14 flying this route ditched in the Caspian Sea following unexplained engine problems. None of the 33 on board survived.

== Aircraft ==
The Ilyushin Il-14P with c/n 146000310 and factory number 03-10 was manufactured at the "Banner of Labor" aircraft plant in Moscow on 19 May 1956 and was then sold to the Main Directorate of the Civil Air Fleet. The il-14 was registered as CCCP-Л1772 and was sent to the Baku air detachment of the Azerbaijan Territorial Administration of Aeroflot. In 1959, it was re-registered as CCCP-61772. At the time of the accident, the aircraft had completed 16,257 flying hours.

== Crew ==
The crew of the 107th flight detachment consisted of:

- Pilot: Grom Konstantovich Kamelin
- Co-pilot: Viktor Konstantinovich Sukhenko
- Flight engineer: Valery Georgievich Mitrofanov
- Radio operator: Yuri Sergeevich Khromykhin

Flight attendant Anna Aleksandrovna Bogdanova worked in the cabin.

== Accident ==
Flight 2723 departed at 08:42 local time from Baku for Saratov with a stopover in Makhachkala. The weather in Baku at the time of departure was stormy, overcast skies with the cloud base at 140–200 m (460–660 ft), moderate to heavy rain, wind gusts to 16–20 m/s (36–45 mph) and horizontal visibility of 2–4 km (1.2–2.5 mi). Twelve minutes after takeoff, at 08:54, while flying at 1,500 m (4,900 ft), the crew reported engine problems. Assuming the cause was wet spark plugs, Kamelin radioed that the aircraft was returning to Baku. The aircraft turned around and began the approach, but soon the crew radioed that the left engine had lost power and was vibrating severely. At 08:59 the crew radioed that the temperature had dropped in both engines, and radioed at 09:02 that they were at 200 m (660 ft). But due to the poor visibility, the pilots had overflown Baku and were now over the Caspian Sea south of the Absheron Peninsula. Five seconds after reporting their altitude, the pilot sent an SOS and radioed: "landing on the water." This was the last radio transmission from the flight.

Military ships of the Caspian Flotilla were brought in to search for the aircraft, but it could not be located. All 33 on board were declared dead.

On 13 May 1966, Navy divers were searching for another sunken object when they found the Il-14 by accident in 23 m (75 ft) of water some 18–20 km (11–12 mi) south of Nargin Island. The aircraft and most of the bodies of those on board were removed from the water by a floating crane. The fuselage was relatively intact, indicating that the aircraft hit the water at a shallow angle.

== Investigation ==
Based on crew reports, the probable cause of the crash was engine failure, which along with the stormy weather, made it impossible to continue the flight. Because the aircraft was not found by the time the investigation was complete, the commission never determined the cause of the engine failures.

== See also ==
- List of previously missing aircraft
