= Old Glory (aircraft) =

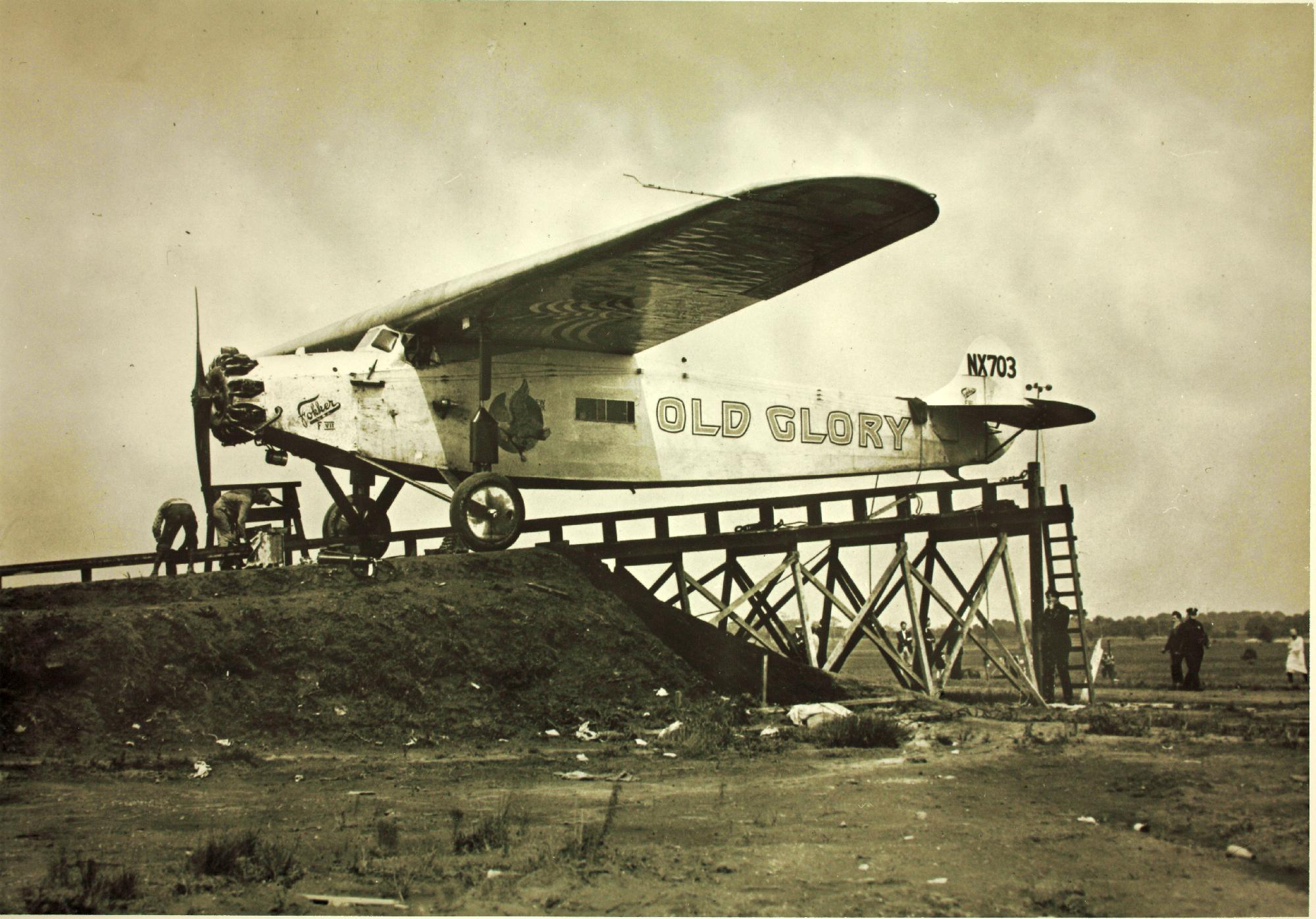
- The Old Glory on its takeoff ramp in Maine

General information
- Type: Fokker F.VIIa
- Construction number: 4899
- Registration: NX703

History
- Manufactured: 1925
- Fate: Lost on the Atlantic Ocean 1927

The Old Glory was a Fokker F.VIIa single-engined monoplane that was used in 1927 on an attempted transatlantic flight from Old Orchard Beach, Maine, United States to Rome, Italy. The flight was sponsored by William Randolph Hearst to promote his newspaper the New York Daily Mirror. The flight was originally to have departed from Roosevelt Field, New York, but due to the weight of the aircraft it was decided to use a landing field at Old Orchard Beach, which offered a longer takeoff run.

At 12:33 EST on 6 September 1927, the Old Glory departed from Old Orchard Beach for Rome; it was piloted by James DeWitt Hill, along with fellow aviator Lloyd W. Bertaud as radio operator, and New York Daily Mirror editor Philip Payne as a passenger. Bertaud reported by radio at 14:55 that all was well, but at 15:55 he reported that the aircraft was heavy. The Old Glory was last sighted by the steamship California at 23:57 the same day, 350 miles east of Cape Race, Newfoundland.

At 03:57 and 04:03, the aircraft sent out distress signals; the nearest ship was Transylvania, which triangulated the position from the two messages and altered course to the estimated location, 65 miles away. The weather was bad with strong winds and rain when Transylvania arrived at the location five hours later. Another four ships joined the search, but after thirty hours it was abandoned. Hearst hired the SS Kyle to search the area again, and on 12 September they found wreckage of the aircraft, but no sign of the crew; the only trace of the plane was a 34-foot section of wing, found 700 miles east of Cape Race, Newfoundland.

== See also ==
- List of missing aircraft

== External references ==
- newenglandaviationhistory.com: "The Loss Of The Old Glory – 1927"
- "Kyle Finds Wreckage "Old Glory"". The Evening Mail. 13 September 1927. p. 7.
