= 2C =

2C or II-C may refer to:

== Biology ==
- 2C (psychedelics), a family of psychedelic phenethylamines
- Alpha-2C adrenergic receptor in biochemistry

== Technology ==
- Apple IIc, a personal computer introduced by Apple Computer in April 1984
- Char 2C, a French heavy tank developed during World War I
- Long March 2C, a Chinese rocket

== Other ==
- Oflag II-C, a World War II German Army Prisoner-of-war camp located near Woldenburg
- 2 cents (disambiguation), a coin in certain realms
- Second Cambridge Catalogue of Radio Sources
- Two's complement, a system for representing signed integers on computers
- 2C Media, a television production company based in Miami, Florida
- In the law of New Jersey, the New Jersey Code of Criminal Justice (Title 2C of the New Jersey Statutes)
- 2C (musician), a Liberian musician and songwriter

== See also ==
- C2 (disambiguation)
- IIC (disambiguation)
