= Lloyd W. Bertaud =

American aviator (1895–1927)

Lloyd Wilson Bertaud
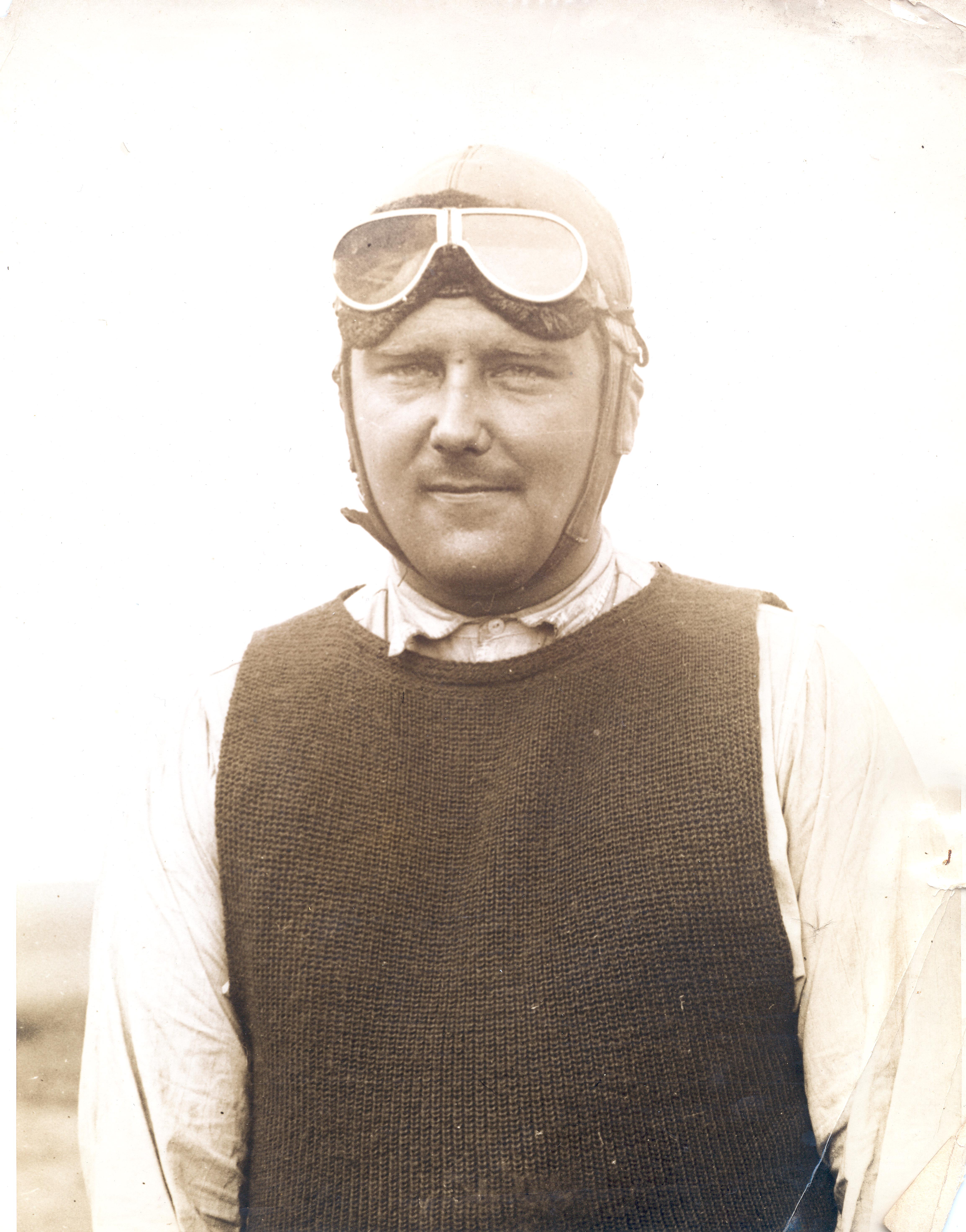
- Bertaud circa 1920–1924
- Born: September 20, 1895; Alameda, California, U.S.
- Died: September 6, 1927 (aged 31); Atlantic Ocean
- Cause of death: Air crash aboard Old Glory
- Occupation: Pilot
- Known for: Record setting flights

Lloyd Wilson Bertaud (September 20, 1895 – September 6, 1927) was an American aviator. Bertaud was selected to be the copilot in the WB-2 Columbia attempting the transatlantic crossing for the Orteig Prize in 1927. Aircraft owner Charles A. Levine wanted to fly in his place, and an injunction by Bertaud against Levine prevented the flight. Aviator Charles Lindbergh won the prize.

== Biography ==
Bertaud was born in Alameda, California on September 20, 1895. As a boy, he built and flew in a glider from Popular Mechanics plans. He was a licensed pilot at the age of 18. In World War I, Bertaud served in the U.S. Army Air Service as a lieutenant. In August 1922, he married Helen Virginia Lent in a ceremony performed by pilot Belvin Maynard during a seaplane flight over the Hudson River.

On September 6, 1927, Bertaud and fellow air-mail pilot James DeWitt Hill flipped to see who would pilot the Fokker monoplane named Old Glory, and Hill won. Bertaud, Hill and Philip Payne took off in the overweight plane over the Atlantic Ocean. The plane did not make it to the destination; only a 34-foot (10 m) section of wing was found 700 miles (1,100 km) east of Cape Race, Newfoundland. Bertaud was lost at sea.

== Records and awards ==
- Bertaud flew air mail routes along the famous "Hells Stretch" between Cleveland and Hadley Field.
- Pulitzer Race, Omaha, Nebraska – In 1921, Bertaud flew a 400 hp Ansaldo A-1 Balilla equipped with a Curtiss D-12 engine against Bert Acosta, placing fourth.
- Kansas City Derby, Kansas City, Kansas – In November 1921, Bertaud won the American Legion Aerial Derby over a 140-mile (230 km) course in 1 hour.
- Endurance record, Roosevelt Field – In January 1922, Bertaud and Edward Stinson won the Aviation medal of merit of the Aero Club of America for their 27-hour world endurance record flown during a snowstorm in the Junkers-Larsen JL-6 on December 30, 1921. The aircraft flew 2,500 miles (4,000 km), also breaking the French-held world's record for distance.
- Orteig Prize - Charles A. Levine, owner of Columbia Aircraft Corp, and the sole Wright-Bellanca WB-2 sought after by pilot Charles Lindbergh, bumped Bertaud from his copilot position on an attempt at the Orteig Prize. Bertaud was promised a settlement to his family if he and his co-pilot Clarence D. Chamberlin crashed, and the prize money if they completed the flight, but Levine refused to sign the document. Bertaud first objected, then later offered to purchase the Columbia for himself. Bertaud filed an injunction, and stalled the flight. Lindbergh took off winning the prize. Levine fired Bertaud, and, two weeks later, had Chamberlin fly him to Berlin, Germany, as the first transatlantic passenger. They landed in Eisleben, breaking Lindbergh's distance mark by 295 miles (475 km). Following the flight, Bertaud attempted to have Bellanca, the designer of the Columbia, build a transatlantic plane for a non-stop attempt on Rome in spite of Levine. The aircraft could not be built in a timely manner. Instead, an agreement was made with Philip Payne, editor of the William Randolph Hearst paper the New York Daily Mirror, for a Fokker F.VIIA aircraft named Old Glory, and a spare seat for Payne, in exchange for the publicity rights.

== Legacy ==
In 1928, the Ontario Surveyor General named a number of lakes in the northwest of the province to honour aviators who had perished during 1927, mainly in attempting oceanic flights. These include Bertaud Lake (50.90°N 90.71°W), Hill Lake (50.56°N 90.77°W) and Payne Lake (50.85°N 90.54°W).

== See also ==
- List of people who disappeared mysteriously at sea
