= IIC =

IIC may refer to

- Itahari International College, IT and Business college in Morang, Nepal.
- Apple IIc, a personal computer introduced by Apple Computer in April 1984
- Institute of Informatics and Communication, University of Delhi South Campus
- I²C, Inter-Integrated Circuit, a serial computer bus
- Ilagan Isabela Cowboys, a Filipino professional basketball team
- Impact insulation class, a method of determining how effective a floor structure is to footfall noise
- Independent Inquiry Committee, a UN committee commissioned with investigating alleged corruption and fraud in the Oil-for-Food Programme
- India International Centre, New Delhi, India
- Industrial Internet Consortium, founded in 2014 to further development, adoption and widespread use of interconnected machines, intelligent analytics and people at work.
- Instituto de Ingeniería del Conocimiento The Knowledge Engineering Institute (CII) is a Spanish research, development and innovation center located on the campus of Universidad Autonoma de Madrid (UAM)
- International Institute for Conservation, the global membership organisation for conservation professionals
- International Review of Intellectual Property and Competition Law, a publication in intellectual property law
- Irish Intermediate Cup, association football cup competition in Northern Ireland
- Israeli Intelligence Community
- Istituto Italiano di Cultura, an Italian Cultural Institute of the Italian Ministry of Foreign Affairs

== See also ==
- 2C (disambiguation), including a list of topics named II-C, etc.
