= Fokker F.VII =

Transport aircraft family by Fokker

F.VII
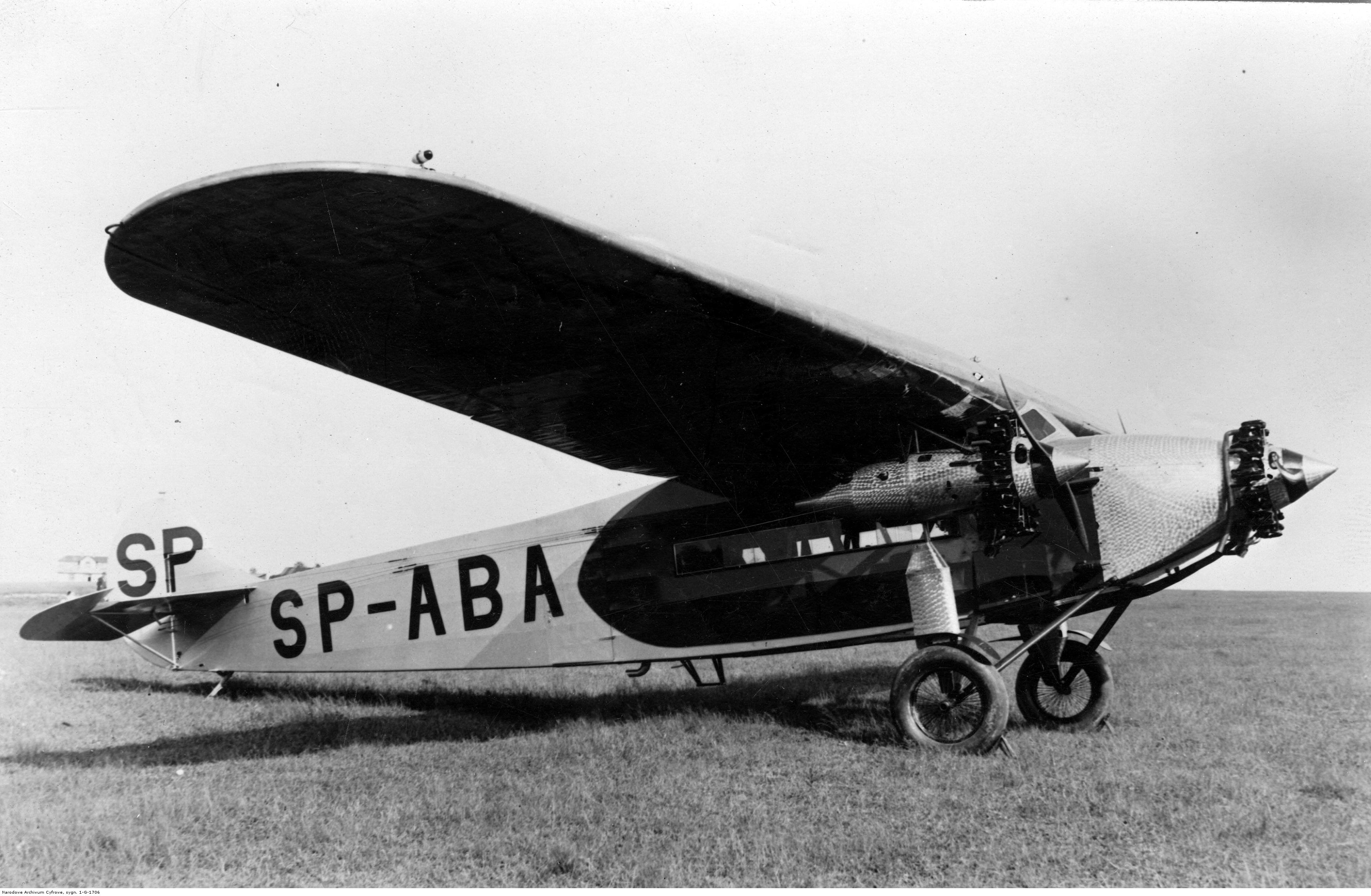
- The improved, three-engine F.VIIB-3m was the most numerous and successful type in the aircraft series; seen here in service with Linie Lotnicze LOT on the Warsaw–Bucharest route.

General information
- Type: Passenger & military transport
- Manufacturer: Fokker
- Designer: Walter Rethel
- Status: Retired
- Primary users: SABENA KLM; Polish Air Force; Polskie Linie Lotnicze LOT

History
- Manufactured: 1925–1932
- Introduction date: 1925
- First flight: 24 November 1924
- Developed from: Fokker F.V
- Variant: Fokker F-10

The Fokker F.VII, also known as the Fokker Trimotor, was an airliner produced in the 1920s by the Dutch aircraft manufacturer Fokker, Fokker's American subsidiary Atlantic Aircraft Corporation, and several other companies under license. It was an airliner that could carry between 6 and 12 people, depending on the version, and it used a variety of engines and engine configurations; while the first versions had a single nose engine, most were produced with three engines.

The F.VII was an important airliner in the 1920s and 1930s; made in several versions, it was used for record breaking flights. An enlarged variant of the F.VII, the F-10, was involved in a famous aviation accident in 1931, leading to safety reforms in the USA. It was also used for an attempt to reach the North Pole, although there was a debate if it did reach all the way there: the aircraft was at least flown in arctic conditions in this attempt. Less controversially, it was flown in the first flight across the Pacific from Australia to the United States, and earlier it was used in flight from the United States to Hawaii.

In the 1930s, the aircraft began to fall out of favor as newer designs that were larger, faster, and more streamlined entered service. Some major variations on this design included the Fokker F-10, which was bigger and could carry four additional passengers, and the Fokker F.VIII, which omitted the central engine thus becoming a twin-engined aircraft. The Fokker F.VII was also produced by licensees outside the Netherlands including SABCA, Avia, Avro, and others.

== Design and development ==
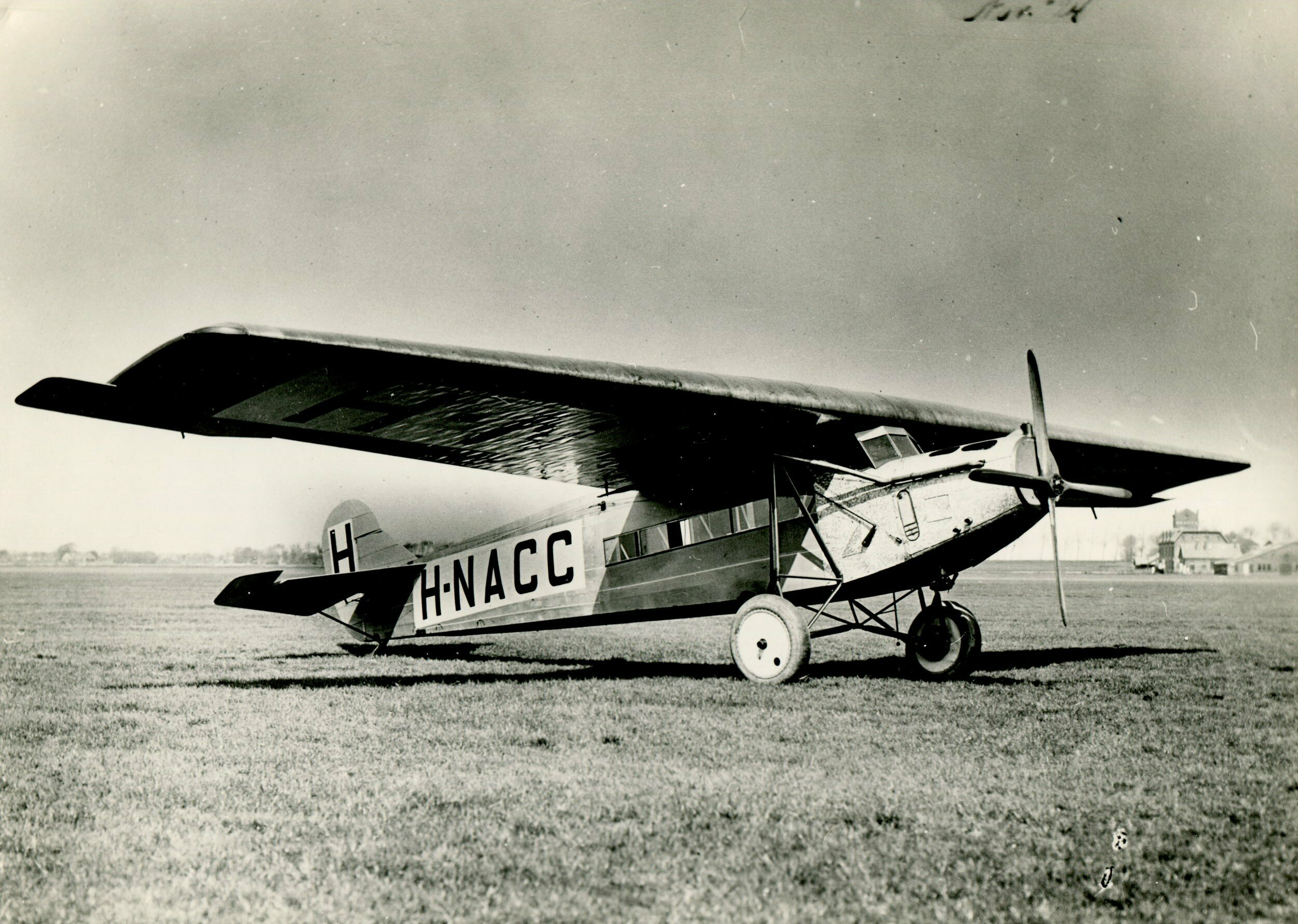
F.VII prototype at Schiphol airport.

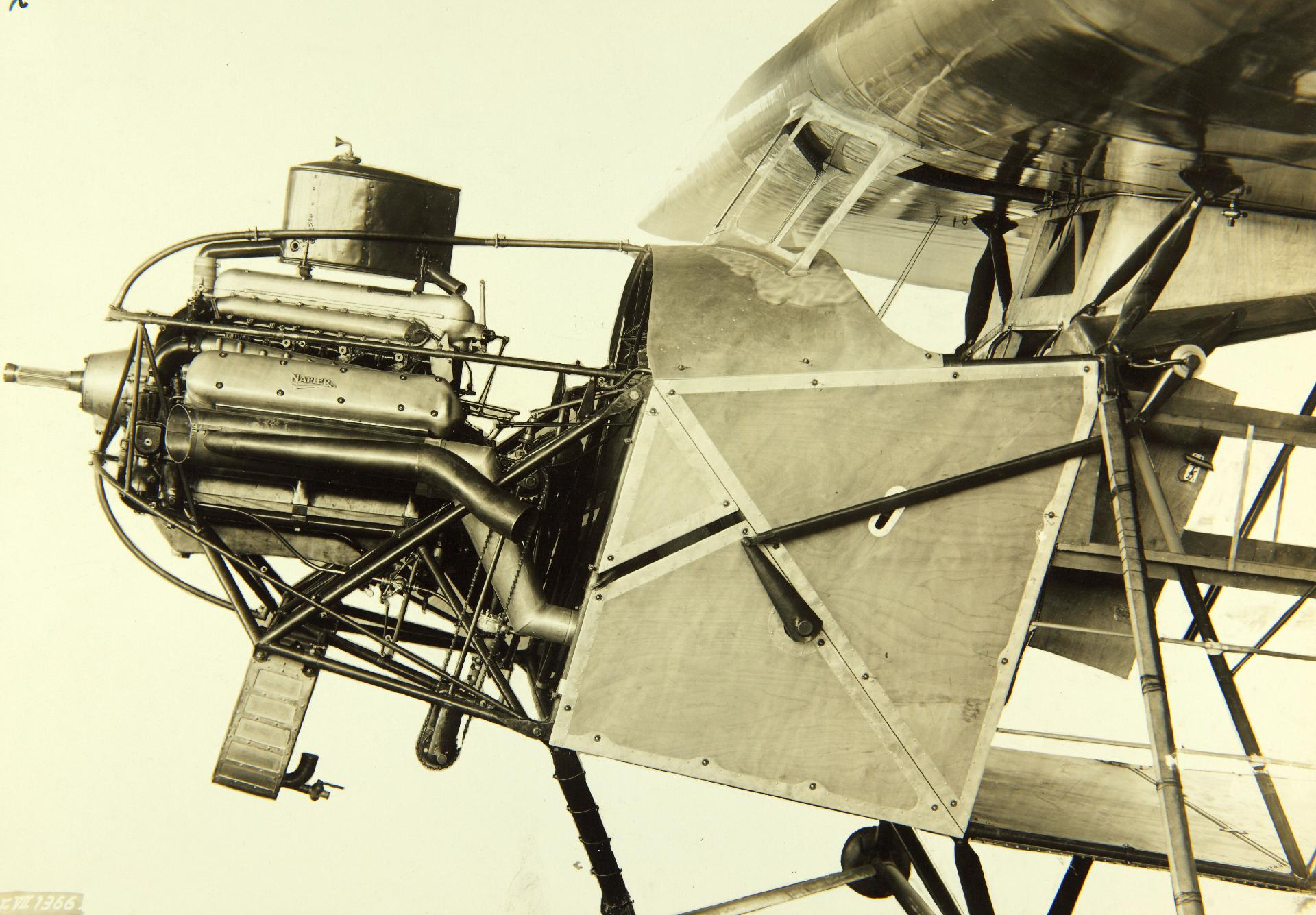
The Napier Lion engine exposed in the nose of a F.VII

The F.VII was designed as a single-engined transport aircraft by Walter Rethel. Five examples of this model were built for the Dutch airline KLM. One of these aircraft, registered H-NACC, was used in 1924 for the first flight from the Netherlands to the Dutch East Indies. In 1925, while living in the US, Anthony Fokker heard of the inaugural Ford Reliability Tour, which was proposed as a competition for transport aircraft. Fokker had the company's head designer, Reinhold Platz, convert a single-engine F.VIIA airliner to a trimotor configuration, powered by 200 hp (150 kW) Wright Whirlwind radial engines. The resulting aircraft was designated the Fokker F.VIIA-3m. Following shipment to the US, it won the Ford Reliability Tour in late 1925. The Trimotor's structure consisted of a fabric-covered steel-tube fuselage and a plywood-skinned wooden wing.

The Fokker F.VIIB-3m had a slightly increased wing area over the F.VIIA-3m, with power increased to 220 hp (160 kW) per engine, while the F.10 was slightly enlarged, carrying 12 passengers in an enclosed cabin. The aircraft became popularly known as the Fokker Trimotor.

The Fokker F.VIII (F.8) was similar, but a twin engine configuration rather than a trimotor, and it was bigger. The Fokker F.IX (F-9) had a similar configuration to the F.VII, but it was quite a bit larger and carried 20 passengers.

== Operational history ==
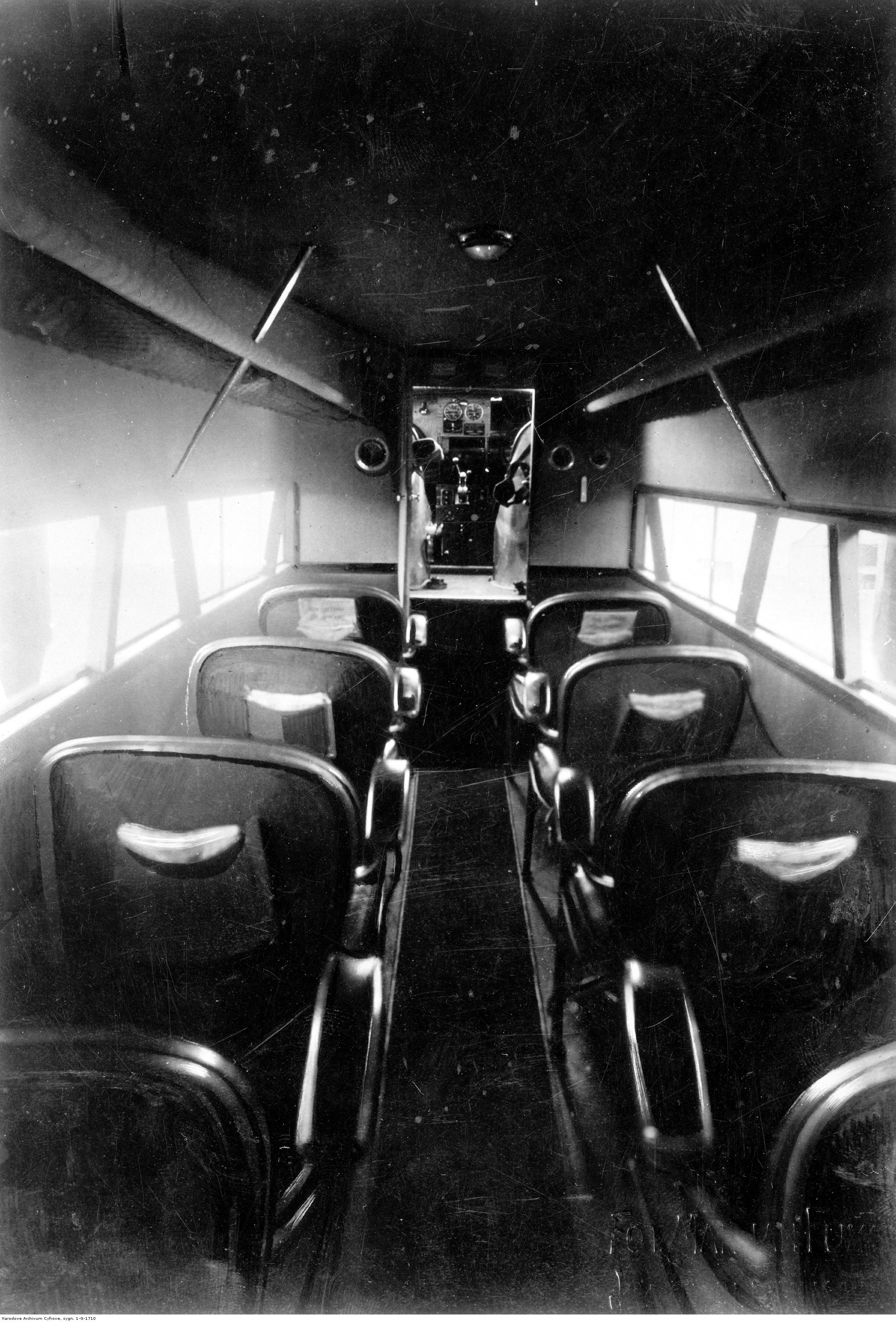
Seating arrangement in the 8-passenger F.VIIB-3m

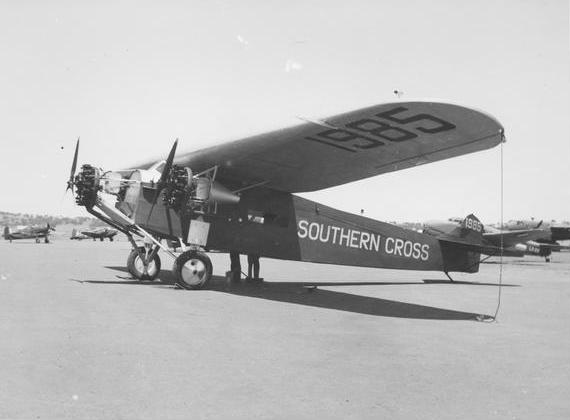
The Southern Cross in 1943.

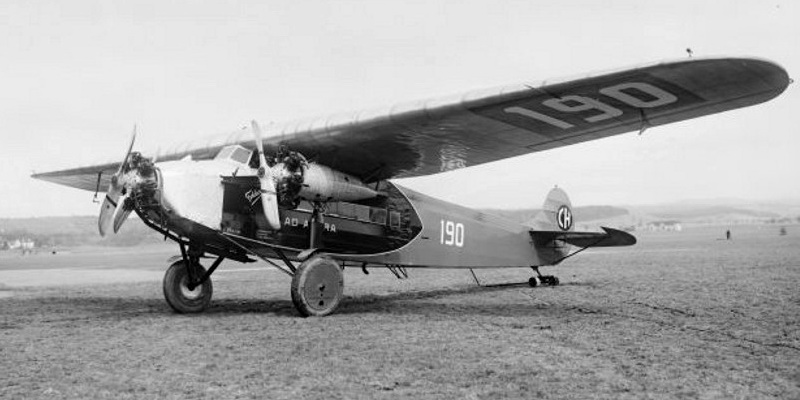
Fokker F.VIIB-3m (CH-190) operated by Ad Astra Aero

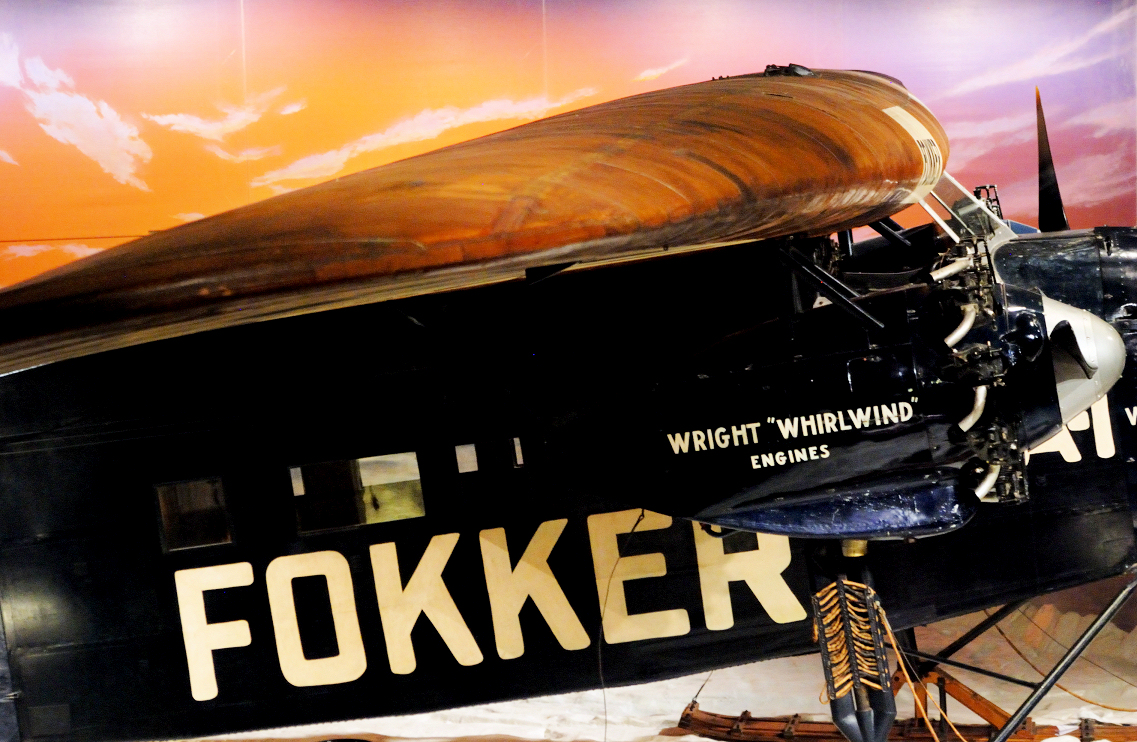
The Josephine Ford at The Henry Ford museum

The eight- to 12-passenger Fokker was the aircraft of choice for many early airlines, both in Europe and the Americas, and it dominated the American market in the late 1920s. However, the popularity of the Fokker quickly waned after the 1931 crash of a Transcontinental & Western Air Fokker F.10, which resulted in the death of Notre Dame football coach Knute Rockne. The investigation revealed problems with the Fokker's plywood-laminate construction, resulting in a temporary ban from commercial flights, more stringent maintenance requirements, and a shift to all-metal aircraft such as the similar Ford Trimotor and later Boeing 247 and Douglas DC-2.

=== Pioneers and explorers ===
The F.VII was used by many explorers and aviation pioneers, including:

- Richard E. Byrd claimed to have flown over the North Pole in the Fokker F.VIIA-3m Josephine Ford (N267) on 9 May 1926, a few days before Roald Amundsen accomplished the feat in the airship Norge.
- Lester Maitland and Albert Hegenberger, two lieutenants of the United States Army Air Corps, made the first transpacific flight from the continental United States to Hawaii (c. 2,400 mi/3,862 km) in the Atlantic-Fokker C-2 Bird of Paradise on 28–29 June 1927.
- Richard E. Byrd, Bernt Balchen and two others flew the first official transatlantic airmail in the civilian-owned C-2 America (NX206), crash-landing off the coast of France on 1 July 1927.
- Lieutenant Colonel 'Dan' Minchin, Captain Leslie Hamilton and Princess Anne of Löwenstein-Wertheim-Freudenberg attempted on 31 August 1927 to become the first aviators to cross the Atlantic from east to west using a Fokker F.VIIa named St. Raphael (G-EBTQ). Their fate remains unknown.
- James DeWitt Hill and Lloyd W. Bertaud made a failed attempt to fly from Old Orchard Beach, Maine, to Rome in the F.VIIA Old Glory (NX703) on 6 September 1927, but they and the aircraft were lost in the North Atlantic the following day.
- Sir Charles Kingsford Smith's F.VIIB-3m Southern Cross was the first aircraft to cross the Pacific from the United States to Australia in June 1928, and the first to cross the Tasman Sea, flying from Australia to New Zealand and back in September of that year.
- Amelia Earhart became the first woman to fly across the Atlantic on 17 June 1928, as a passenger aboard the Fokker F.VIIB-3m Friendship (NX4204).
- A group of U. S. Army Air Corps flyers, led by then-Major Carl Spaatz, set an endurance record of over 150 hours with the Question Mark, a Fokker C-2A over Los Angeles on 1 to 7 January 1929. The purpose of this mission was to set a flight endurance record using aerial refueling.
- Princess Xenia (a FVII, registered G-EBTS later renamed 'The Spider')
  - 2 September 1928, C D Barnard and Eric Alliot flew Karachi to London 5,000 miles in 4.5 days
  - 2–8 August 1929 C D Barnard, Bob Little and Mary Russell, Duchess of Bedford flew to Karachi and back; 10,000 miles in eight days.
  - 10 April 1930, C D Barnard, Bob Little and the Duchess of Bedford flew from Lympne to Cape Town - 9,000 miles in 91 hours and twenty minutes over 10 days.

== Variants ==
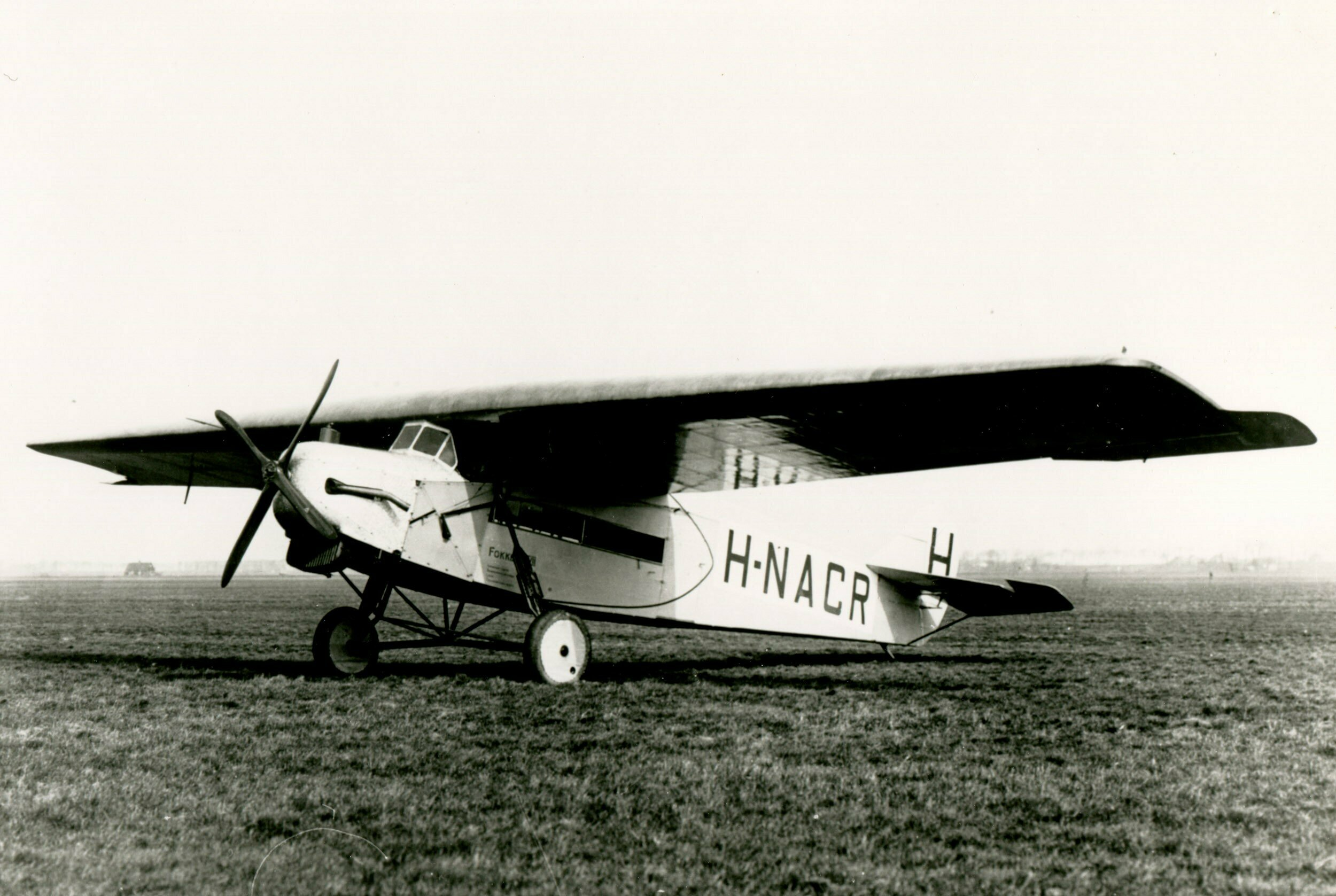
The F.VII with a single inline Napier Lion engine.

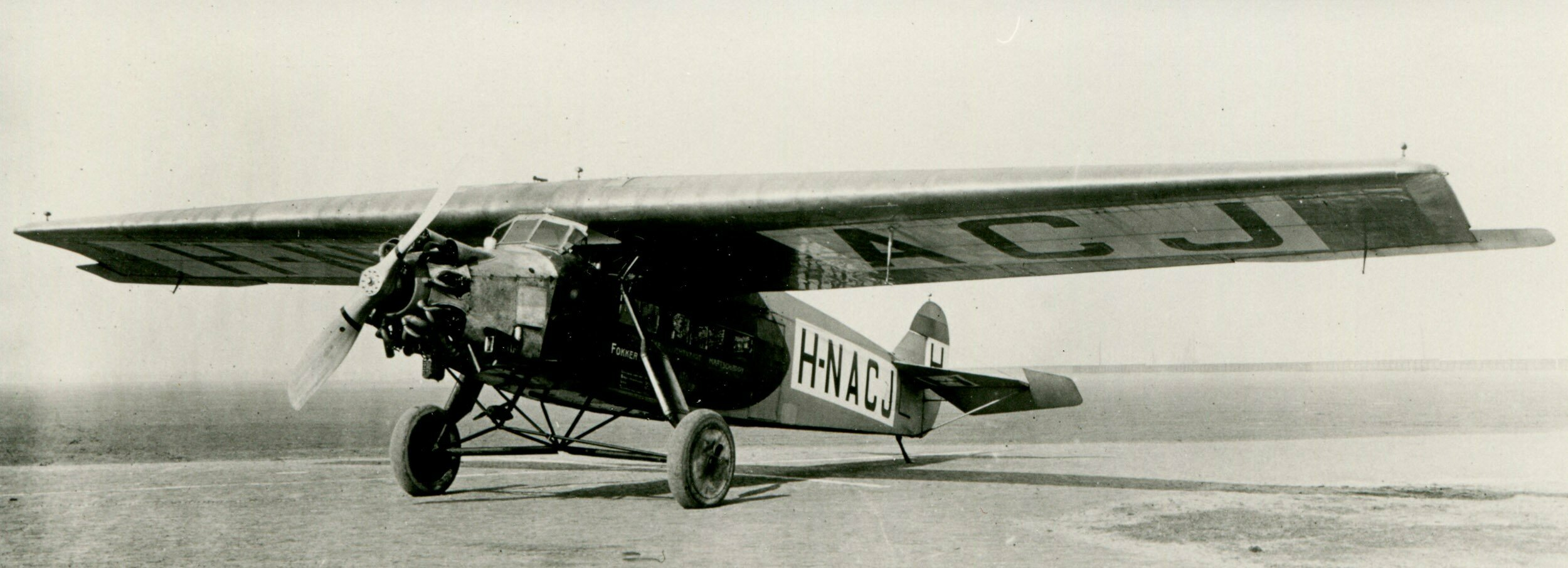
F.VII retrofitted with a Bristol Jupiter radial engine in KLM livery.

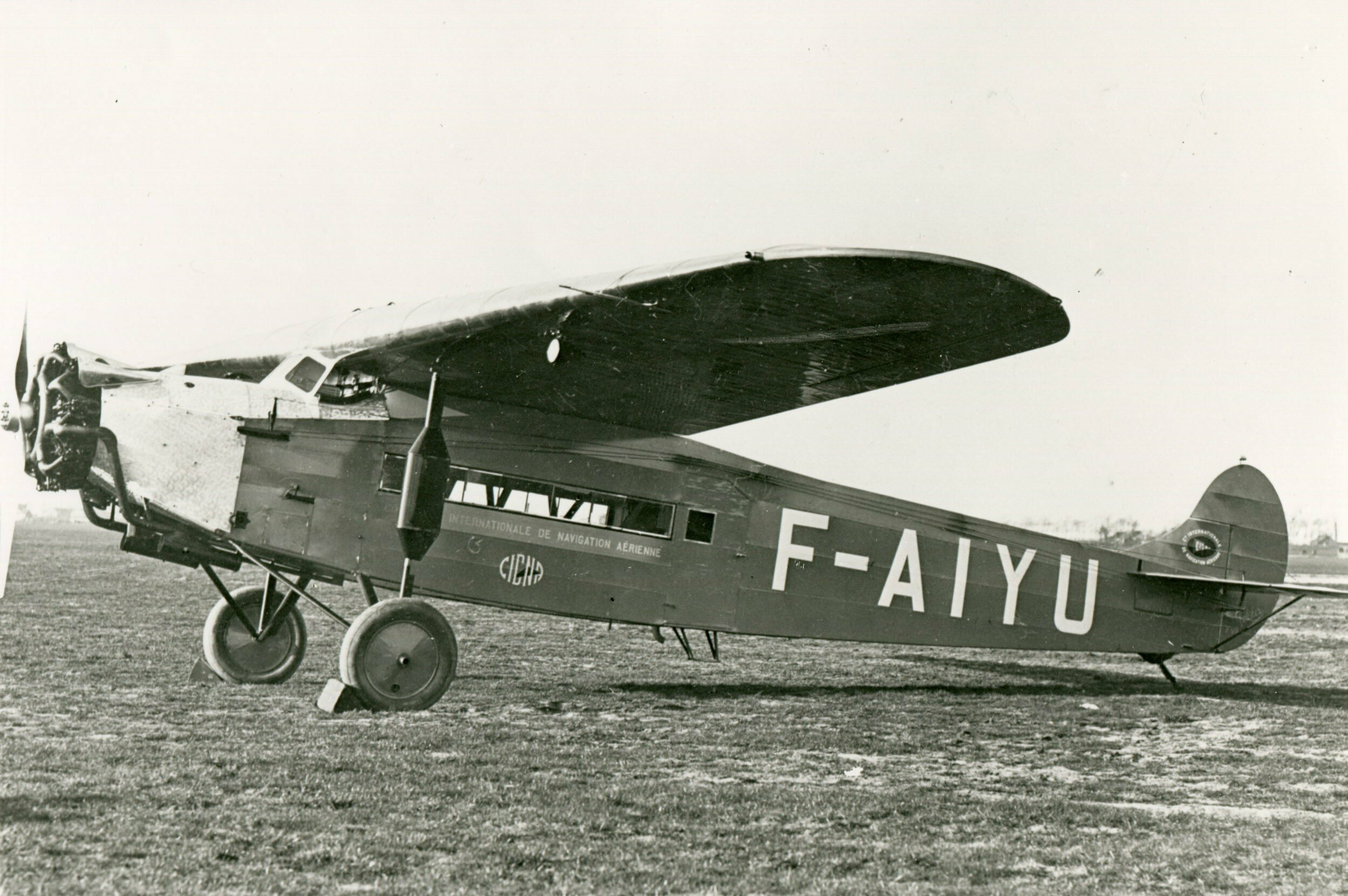
The French-registered F.VIIA flown for CIDNA (Compagnie Internationale de Navigation Aérienne).

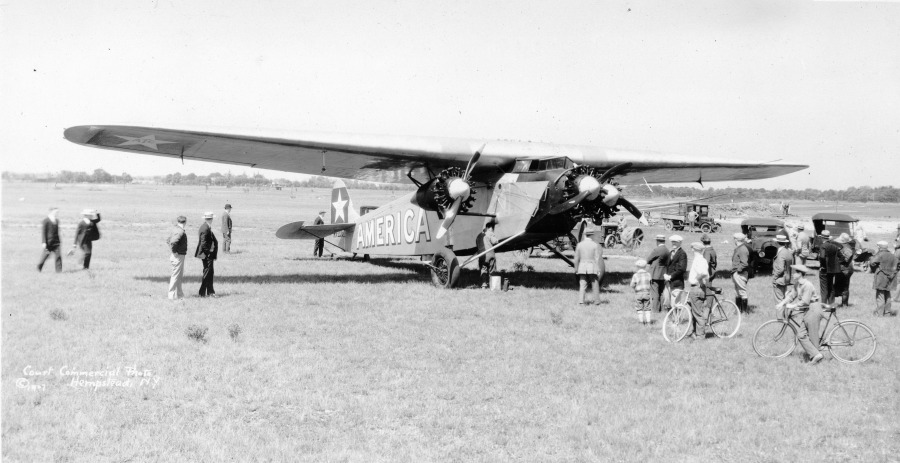
America before its journey across the Atlantic, which was a Civilian C-2 version

F.VII
Single-engined transport aircraft, powered by 360 hp (270 kW) Rolls-Royce Eagle or 450 hp (340 kW) Napier Lion 12-cylinder inline engines, accommodation for two crew and six passengers; five built. One converted to use 400 hp (300 kW) Bristol Jupiter 9-cylinder radial and two to use 480 hp (360 kW) Gnome-Rhône built Jupiter VI engine.
F.VIIA (F.VIIA-1m)
Single-engined transport aircraft; the capacity was increased to carry 8 passengers and the aircraft received a new, simplified undercarriage with suspension and aerodynamic improvements (the ailerons were contained within the profile of the wing and capped by rounded wing tips, the aircraft was equipped with an adjustable stabilizer). Flown on 12 March 1925. First aircraft had a 420 hp (310 kW) V-12 Packard Liberty engine, but a further 39 F.VIIA examples had mostly Bristol Jupiter or Pratt & Whitney Wasp radial engines.
F.VIIA-3m
The result of an attempt to improve the reliability of the aircraft by installing two additional underwing engines; flown on 4 September 1925. The first two aircraft were otherwise identical to the F.VIIA. From the third aircraft, the fuselage was 31 in (80 cm) longer and was powered by 200 hp (149 kW) Wright J-4 Whirlwind radial engines. Probably only 18 were built, while many F.VIIA were upgraded to the F.VIIA-3m standard.
F.VIIB-3m
Main production variant with heavier engines (offered were the 300 hp (220 kW) Wright Whirlwind, Armstrong Siddeley Lynx or 360 hp (270 kW) Titan Major radial engines) as well as a greater wing span and modified wing geometry; 154 built, including those built under licence.
F-9
American-built version of the Fokker F.VIIB-3m; built by the Atlantic Aircraft Corporation in the United States.
F-10
Enlarged version of the Fokker F.VII airliner, able to carry up to 12 passengers; built by the Atlantic Aircraft Corporation in the United States.

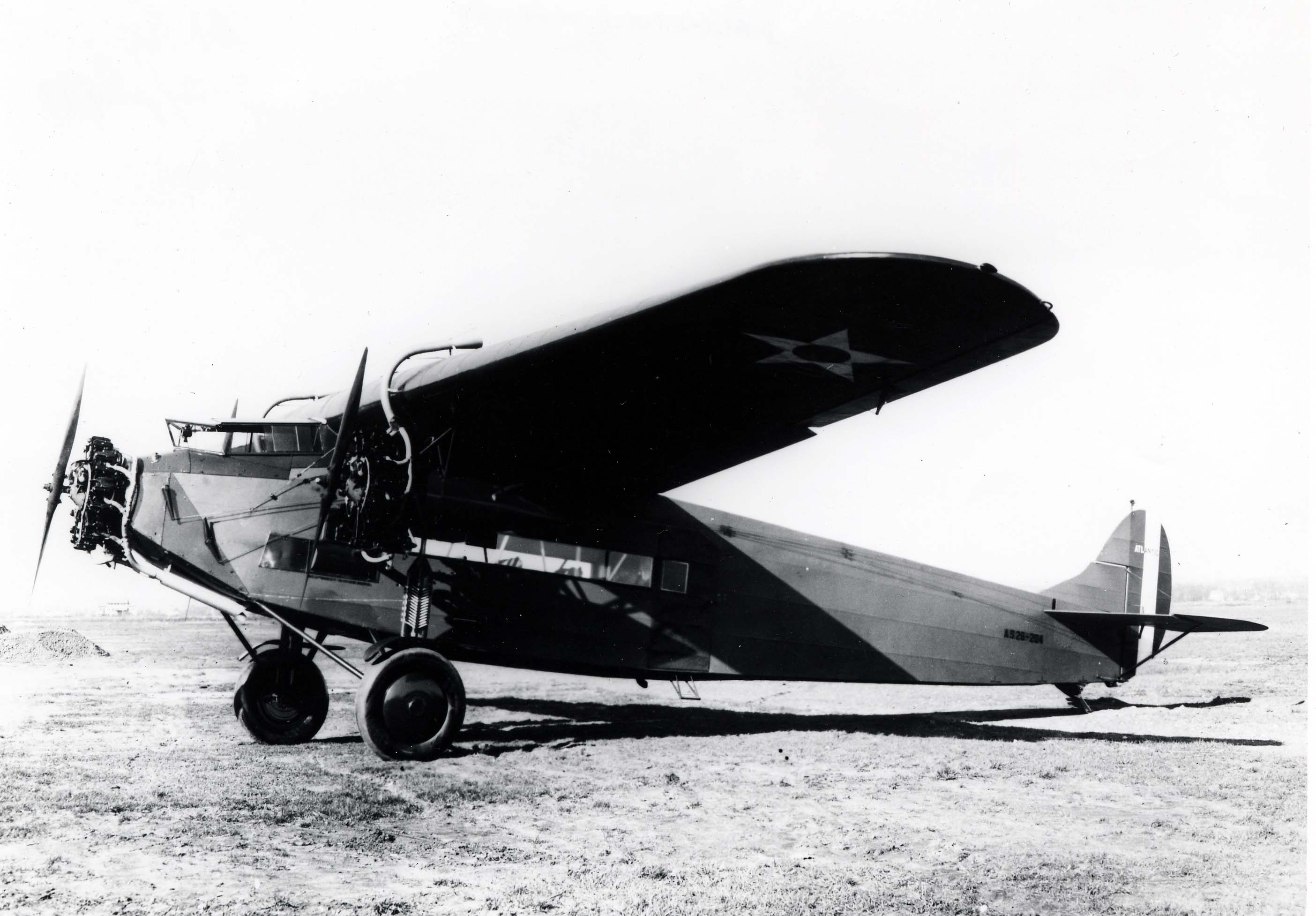
A C-2 of the United States Army

C-2
Military transport version of the Fokker F.9, powered by three 220 hp (164 kW) Wright J-5 radial piston engines, accommodation for two pilots and ten passengers; three built in 1926 for the US Army Air Corps.
C-2A
Military transport version for the US Army Air Corps, with greater wingspan, powered by three 220 hp (164 kW) Wright J-5 radial piston engines, accommodation for two pilots and ten passengers; eight built in 1928.
XC-7
One C-2A fitted with three 330 hp (246 kW) Wright J-6-9 radial piston engines. Re-designated C-7 when four C-2A examples were similarly reconfigured.
C-7
Military transport conversion of C-2A for the US Army Air Corps by re-engining with 300 hp (220 kW) Wright R-975 engines. XC-7 prototype and four C-2As re-designated in 1931.
C-7A
Six new production C-7 (Wright R-975) aircraft with larger wings, new vertical fin design, and fuselages patterned after the commercial F.10A.
XLB-2
Experimental light bomber version of the C-7, powered by three 410 hp (306 kW) Pratt & Whitney R-1380 Wasp radial piston engines; one built.
TA-1
Military transport version for the US Navy and Marine Corps; three built.
TA-2
Military transport version for the US Navy; three built.
TA-3
Military transport version for the US Navy, powered by three Wright J-6 radial piston engines; one built.
RA-1
Re-designation of the TA-1.
RA-2
Re-designation of the TA-2.
RA-3
Re-designation of the TA-3.

=== Licensed versions ===
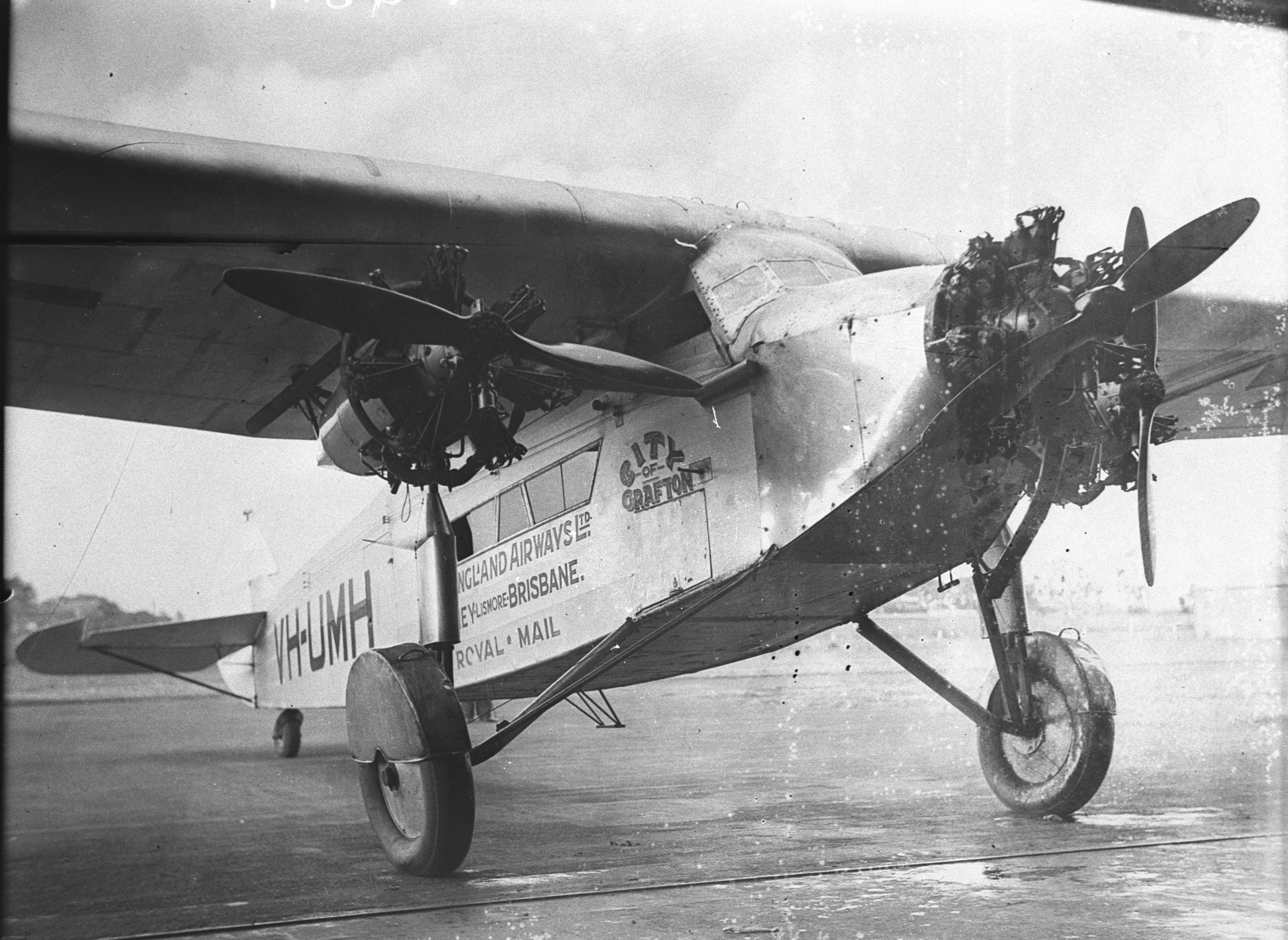
Avro 618 Ten

- SABCA, 29 aircraft built.
- Avia, 18 aircraft built.
- Three aircraft built in Italy as the IMAM Ro.10, powered by three 215 hp Alfa Romeo Lynx (licence built Armstrong Siddeley) engines. Three built for operation by Avio Linee Italiane and Ala Littoria.
- Plage i Laśkiewicz. Between 1929 and 1930, produced 11 examples of F.VIIB-3m, plus 20 of its own F.VIIB-3m bomber version (developed by Jerzy Rudlicki).
- Three aircraft built in Spain.
- Avro, 14 aircraft known as Avro 618 Ten used Armstrong Siddeley Lynx engines

== Operators ==
=== Civilian operators ===
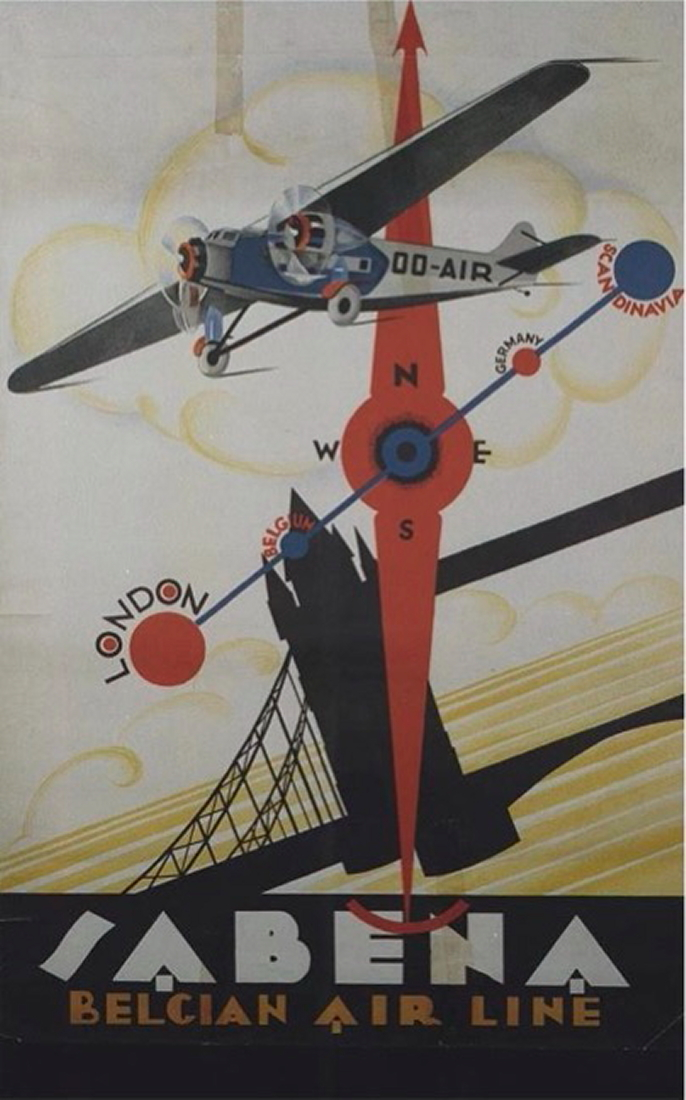
Historical poster with stylized Fokker F.VII for the Belgian airline SABENA

Belgium

- SABENA operated 28 aircraft.

Denmark

- Det Danske Luftfartselskab operated three F.VIIA aircraft.

France

- CIDNA operated seven F.VIIA aircraft.
- Air Orient operated eight F.VIIB aircraft.
- STAR operated one F.VIIA aircraft.

Italy

- Avio Linee Italiane
- Ala Littoria

Hungary

- Malert operated two F.VIIA aircraft.

Manchukuo

- 2 F.VIIB-3ms operated by the Manchuria Aviation Company

Netherlands

- KLM received all five F.VII aircraft and 15 F.VIIA.

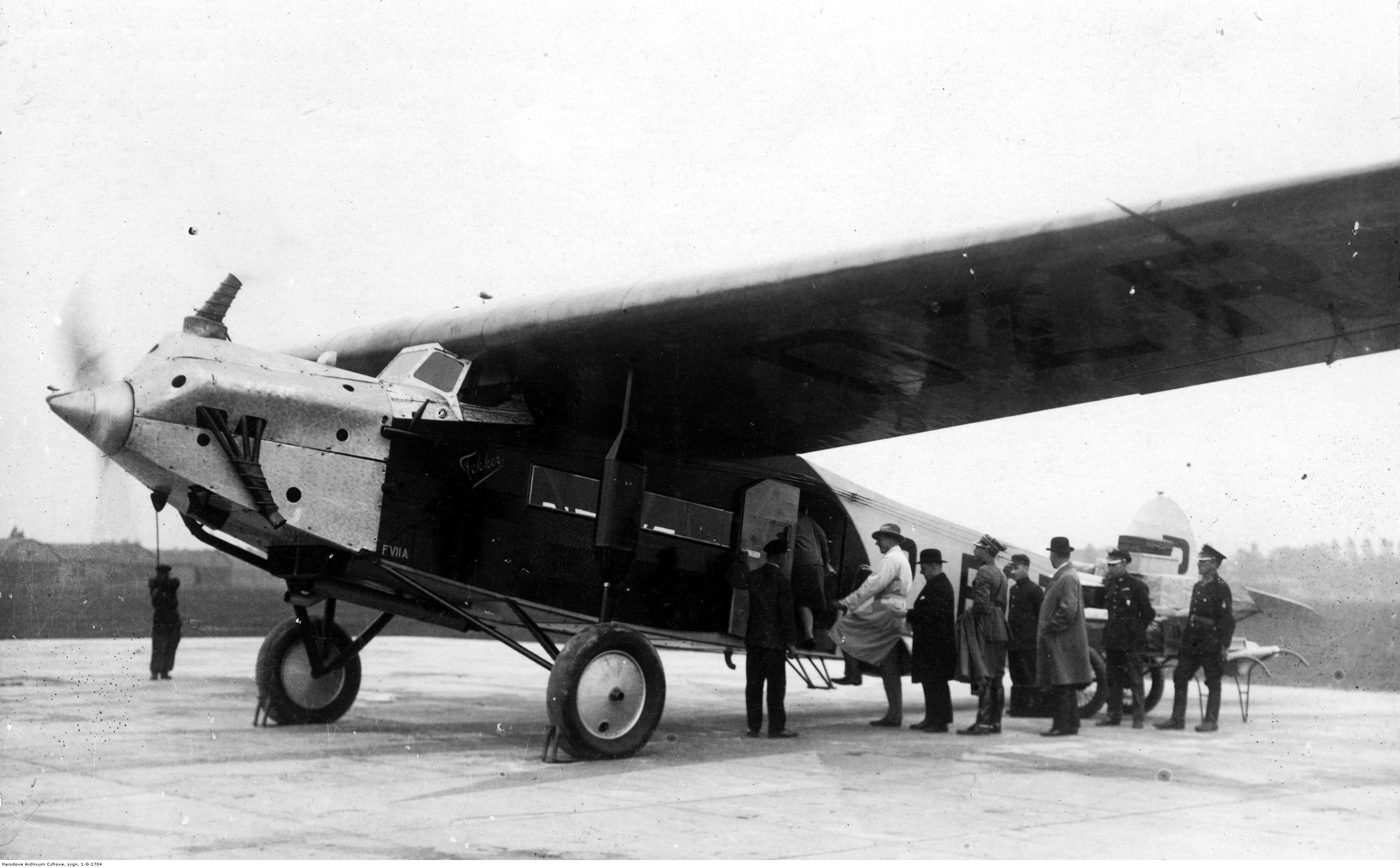
F.VIIA of Polish carrier LOT powered by a Lorraine-Dietrich 12Eb engine built by Polish Skoda Works (PZS)

Poland

- Aero operated six F.VIIA aircraft for a short period in 1928. Since 1 January 1929, all aircraft were handed over to PLL LOT airline.
- Polskie Linie Lotnicze LOT operated six F.VIIA and 13 locally license-built F.VIIB-3m between 1929 and 1939.

Portugal

- Aero Portuguesa operated one F.VIIB-3m aircraft.

Romania

- CFRNA

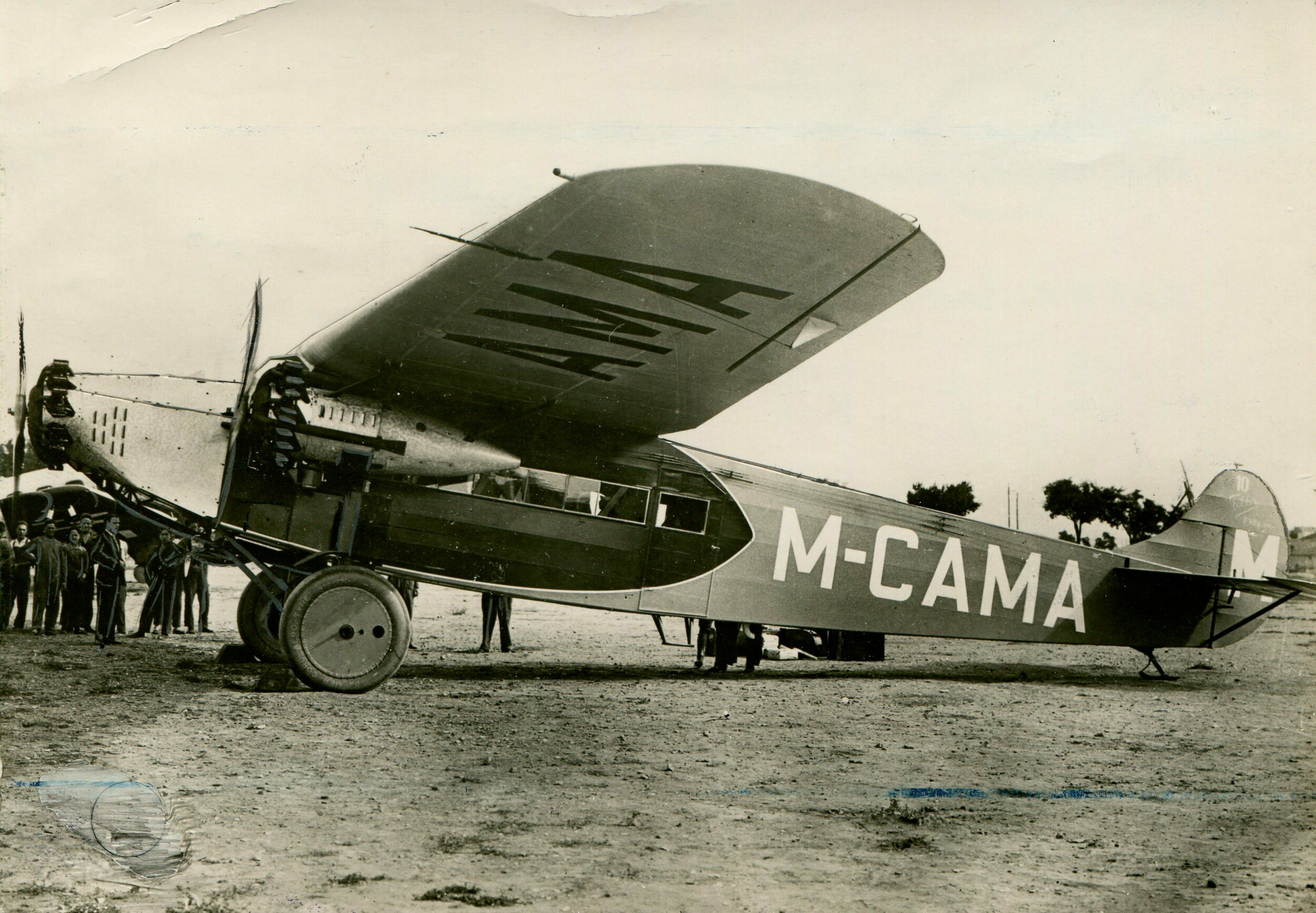
Fokker F.VIIB-3m of Spanish state-owned airline CLASSA.

Spain

- CLASSA
- LAPE

Switzerland

- Ad Astra Aero at least one F.VIIB-3m
- Swissair operated one F.VIIA and eight F.VIIB-3m aircraft.

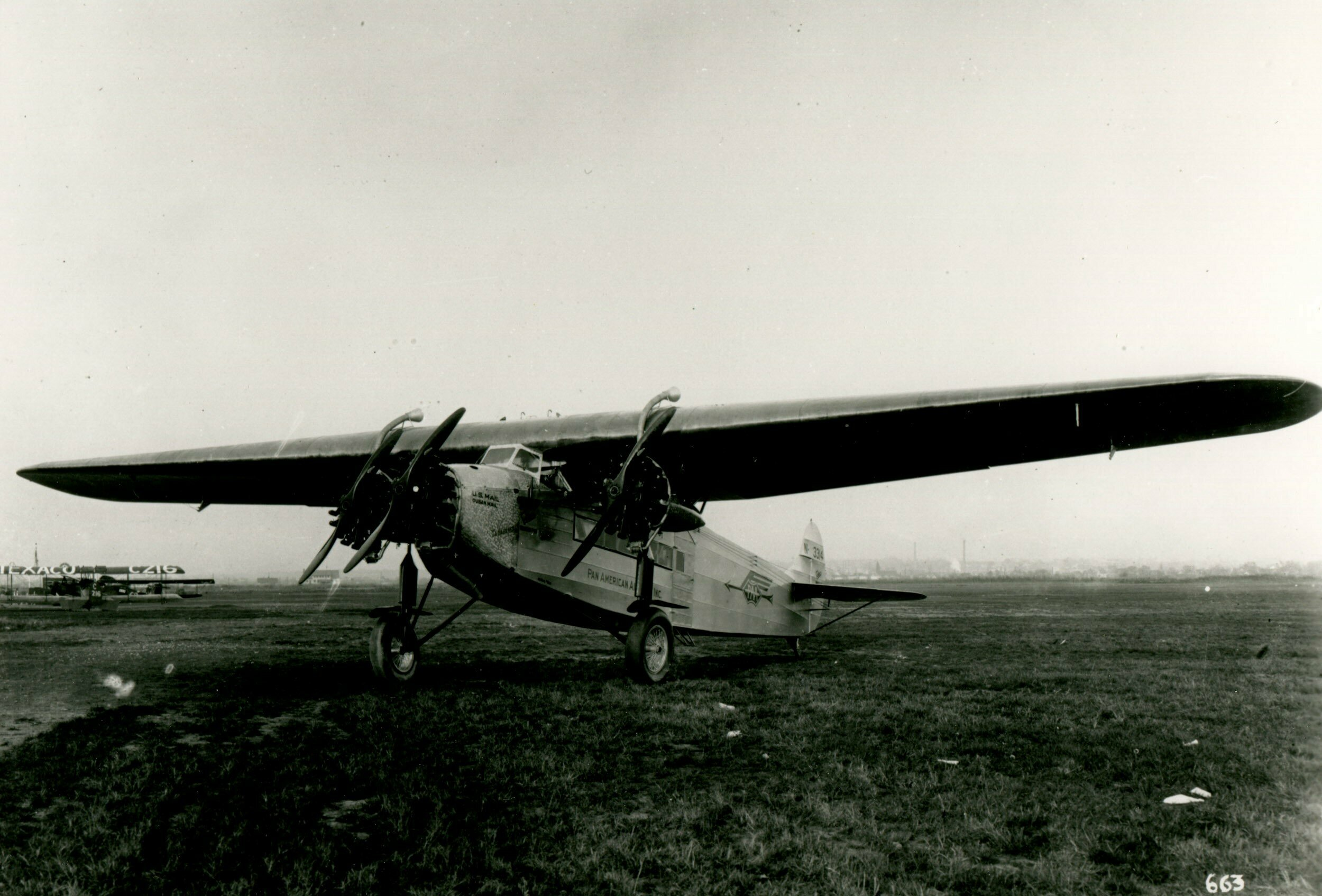
Pan Am Fokker F.VIIB-3m

United States

- American Airways, which later became American Airlines.
- TWA
- Pan Am operated F.VIIB-3m aircraft.

=== Military operators ===
Belgium

- Belgian Air Force

Belgian Congo

- Force Publique

Independent State of Croatia

- Zrakoplovstvo Nezavisne Države Hrvatske

Czechoslovakia

- Czechoslovak Air Force

Ethiopia

- Ethiopian Air Force

Finland

- Finnish Air Force operated one F.VIIA.

France

- French Air Force - five F.VIIA-3m and two F.VIIB-3m aircraft, impressed into military service in 1939/1940.

Hungary

- Royal Hungarian Air Force

Italy

- Regia Aeronautica

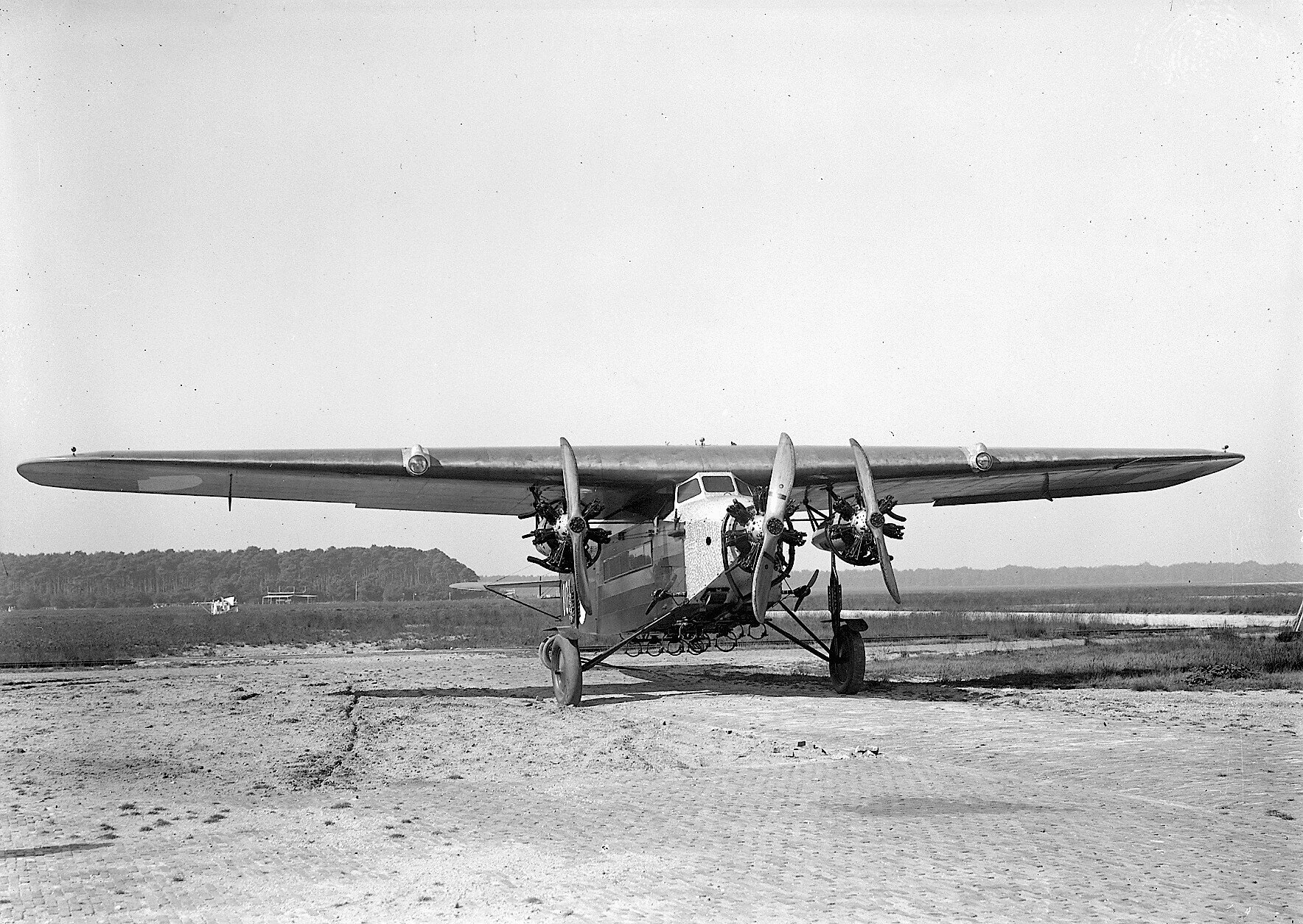
Dutch bomber variant based on the F.VIIA-3m with bomb racks visible and large floodlights for landing in poor visibility; designated F.VIIA-3m/M.

Netherlands

- Royal Netherlands Air Force received three bomber aircraft modified from the standard F.VIIA-3m and designated F.VIIA-3m/M.

Poland

- Polish Air Force operated 21 F.VIIB-3m (20 of them were licence-built) aircraft as bombers and transports between 1929 and 1939.
  - 1 Pułk Lotniczy
    - 211 Eskadra Bombowa
    - 212 Eskadra Bombowa
    - 213 Eskadra Bombowa

Spanish Republic

- Spanish Republican Air Force, operated four aircraft in the squadron of the Sahara and other two in Madrid.

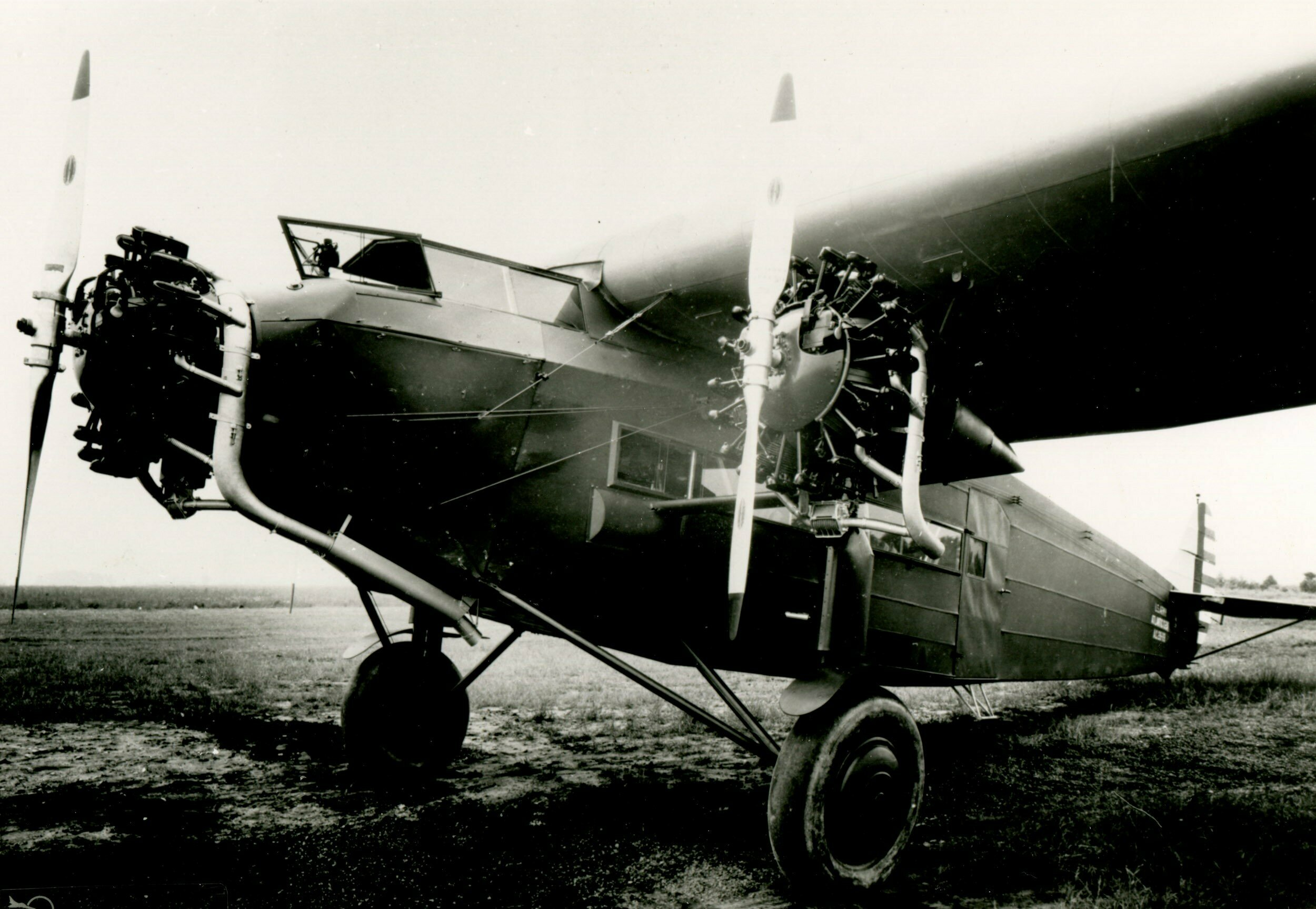
The slightly enlarged Fokker C-2A flown by the US Army Air Corps.

United States

- United States Army Air Corps designations include Atlantic-Fokker C-2, C-5 and C-7.
- United States Navy and United States Marine Corps, originally designated TA then RA

Kingdom of Yugoslavia

- Yugoslav Royal Air Force

== Accidents and incidents ==
- On 21 June 1926, a KLM F.VII (H-NACL) force-landed at Seabrook Beach, Sandgate near Hythe, Kent, due to fuel exhaustion caused by pilot error; all five on board survived, but the aircraft was written off.
- On 9 July 1926, a KLM F.VII (H-NACC) struck ground in fog at Wolvertem, Belgium, killing both pilots.
- On 8 June 1927, a Fokker/Atlantic F.VIIB-3m (NC55) of Colonial Air Transport crashed on landing at Hasbrouck Heights, New Jersey; no casualties.
- At 9:44pm on 31 August 1927, the oil tanker SS Josiah Macy reported the last known sighting of F.VIIA St. Raphael (G-EBTQ) on a trans-Atlantic attempt from RAF Upavon, England to Ottawa, Ontario, Canada, piloted by Leslie Hamilton and Frederick F. Minchin, with Princess Anne of Löwenstein-Wertheim-Freudenberg as passenger.

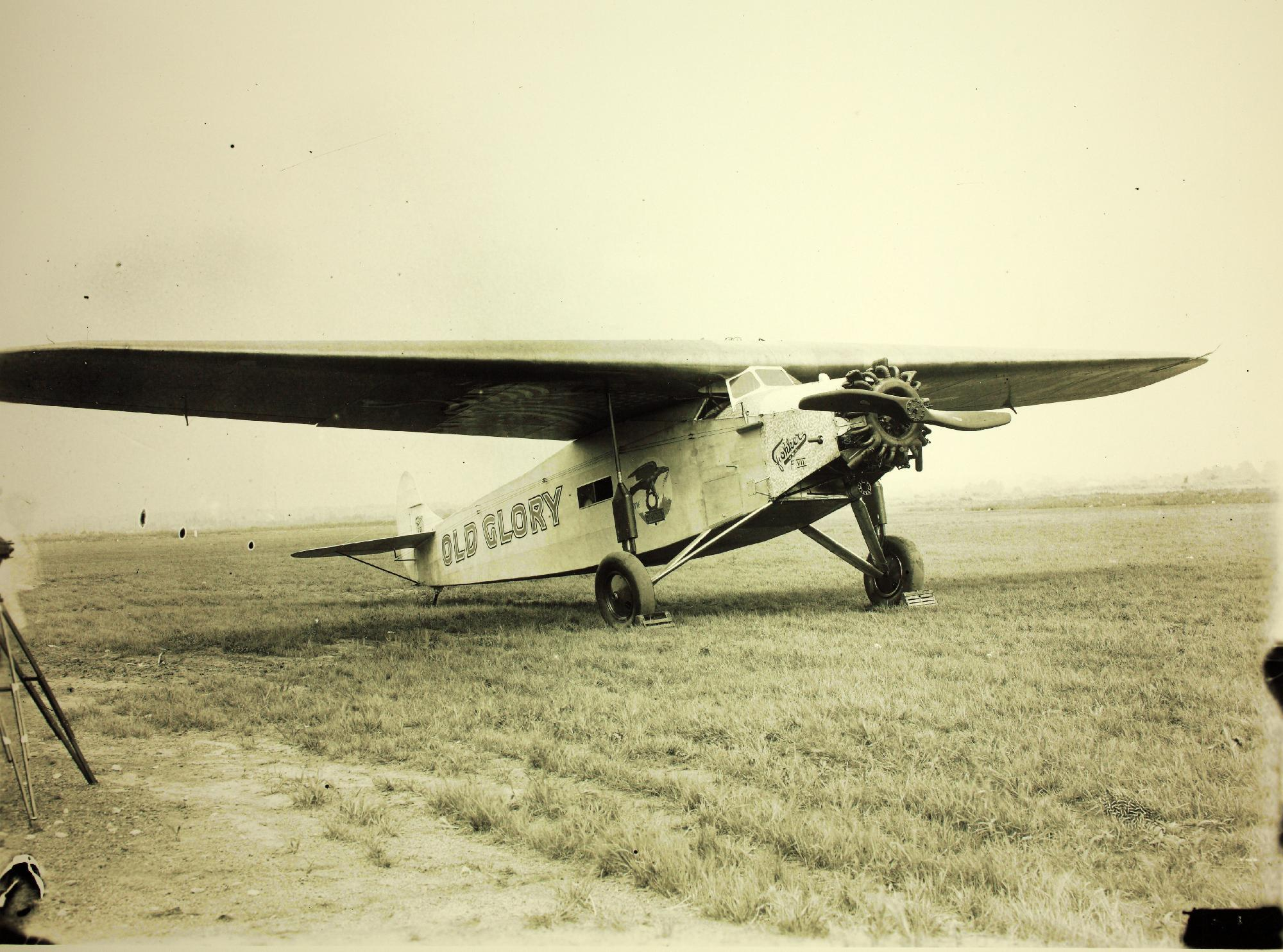
Old Glory was used for an attempted transatlantic flight in 1927, but it was lost en route

- On 7 September 1927, F.VIIA Old Glory (NX703) disappeared with Lloyd W. Bertaud and James DeWitt Hill at the controls, in an attempted transatlantic flight from Old Orchard Beach, Maine to Rome, Italy. The flight's last known location was in the North Atlantic, 960 km East of Cape Race, Newfoundland.
- On 17 September 1927, a Reynolds Airways F.VII (C776) crashed at Dunellen, New Jersey, due to loss of control following engine failure, killing seven of 12 on board. The aircraft was formerly operated by KLM, and had been imported to the United States.
- On 4 July 1928, Belgian financier Alfred Lowenstein disappeared during a flight over the English Channel as a passenger in Fokker F.VIIA-3m (G-EBYI), in unknown circumstances.
- On 15 August 1928, a Pan Am F.VIIA-3m, General Machado (NC53) ditched in the Gulf of Mexico off Egmont Key, Florida.
- On 4 July 1929, a Fokker F.VIIA-3m (G-EBYI) force landed near Mongalla, Sudan. Owner and pilot was Donald H Drew, three passengers included Glen Kidston, no casualties. Aircraft damaged beyond repair.
- On 11 September 1930, a Sabena F.VII (OO-AIN) crashed on climbout from Croydon Airport due to an in-flight fire, killing both pilots.
- On 30 October 1930, a Fokker F.VIIb/3m (CH-161) of Balair struck a chimney, and crashed in fog on approach to Essen/Mülheim Airport; three crew injured, three passengers unhurt. See also Commons Category:Fokker F.VIIb/3m of Balair
- On 6 December 1931, a KLM F.VIIb/3m (PH-AFO) crashed at Bangkok after failing to take off, killing five of seven on board.
- On 3 April 1940, a BOAC Avro 618 Ten (G-AASP, Hercules) crashed on takeoff from Cairo; there were no casualties, but the aircraft was written off.

== Specifications (F.VIIb/3m) ==
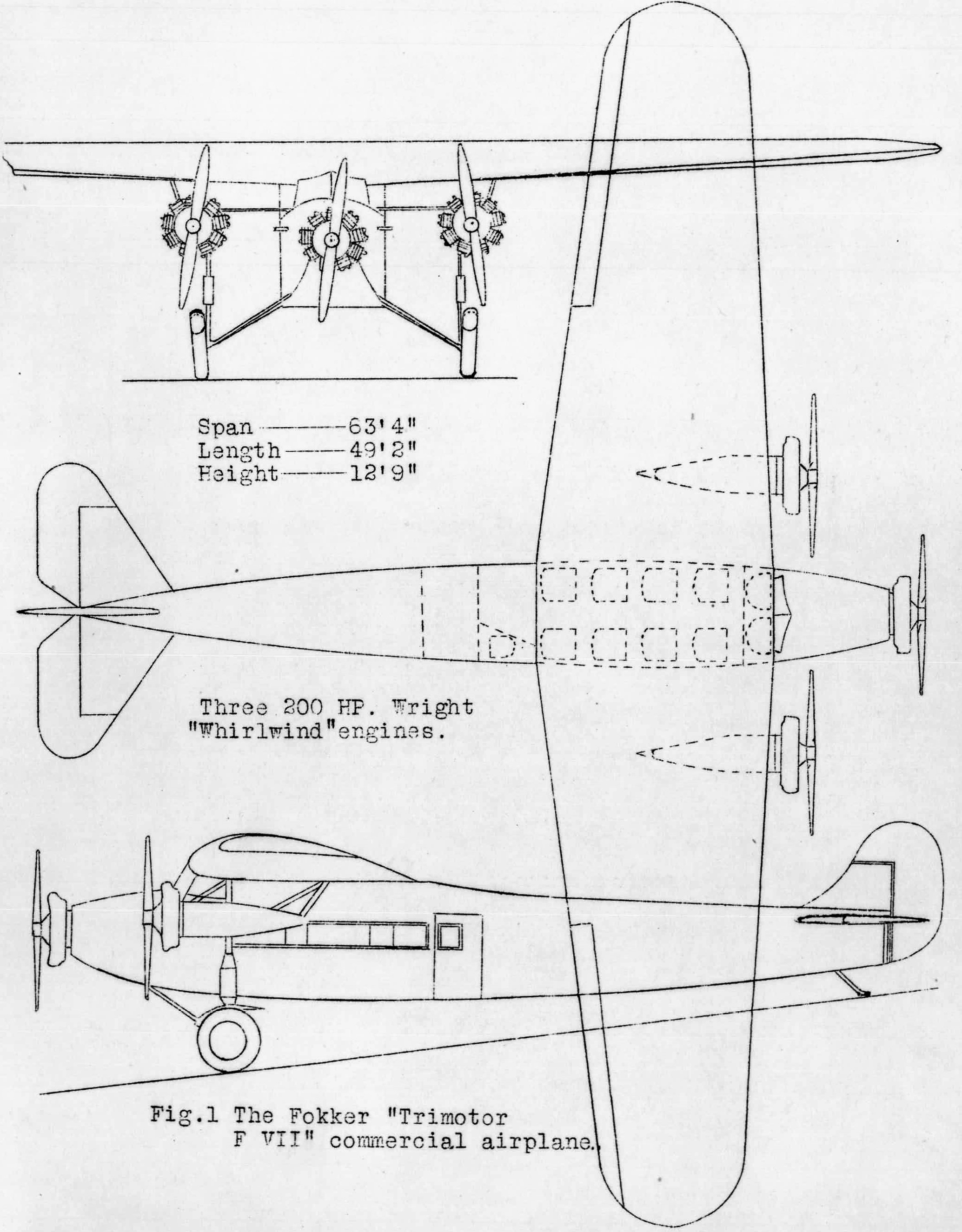
Fokker F.VII/3m 3-view drawing from NACA Aircraft Circular No.74

Data from European Transport Aircraft since 1909

General characteristics

- Crew: 2
- Capacity: 8 passengers
- Length: 14.50 m (47 ft 7 in)
- Wingspan: 21.71 m (71 ft 3 in)
- Wing area: 67.6 m^{2} (728 sq ft)
- Airfoil: root: Goettingen 386 (20%); tip: Goettingen 388 (11.3%)
- Empty weight: 3,100 kg (6,834 lb)
- Gross weight: 5,300 kg (11,684 lb)
- Powerplant: 3 × Wright J-6 Whirlwind 9-cylinder air-cooled radial piston engine, 220 kW (300 hp) each

Performance

- Maximum speed: 210 km/h (130 mph, 110 kn)
- Cruise speed: 178 km/h (111 mph, 96 kn)
- Range: 1,200 km (750 mi, 650 nmi)
- Service ceiling: 4,400 m (14,400 ft)
- Takeoff and landing runs: 225 m (738 ft)

== See also ==
Related development

- Avro 618 Ten
- Fokker F.10

Aircraft of comparable role, configuration, and era

- Ford Trimotor

Related lists

- List of aircraft of World War II
- List of aircraft of the Finnish Air Force
- List of military aircraft of the United States
- List of United States Navy aircraft designations (pre-1962)
- List of civil aircraft
