= Bill C-2 =

Bill C-2 refers to various legislation introduced into the House of Commons of Canada. Because Bill C-1 is a pro forma bill asserting the independence of Parliament, Bill C-2 is the first substantive bill introduced into each session of the House.

Legislation introduced as Bill C-2 includes:

- Strong Borders Act, introduced in 2025 to the first session of the 45th parliament
- An Act to amend the Criminal Code (protection of children and other vulnerable persons) and the Canada Evidence Act, introduced in 2004 to the first session of the 38th Parliament
- Federal Accountability Act, introduced in 2006 to the first session of the 39th Parliament
