= List of previously missing aircraft =

This is a list of previously missing aircraft that disappeared in flight for reasons that were initially never definitely determined. The status of "previously missing" is a grey area, as there is a lack of sourcing on both the amount of debris that needs to be recovered, as well as the amount of time it takes after the crash for the aircraft to be recovered while searching, to fit this definition. According to Annex 13 of the International Civil Aviation Organization, an aircraft is considered to be missing "when the official search has been terminated and the wreckage has not been located", but this does not go into defining found aircraft. The following entries are aircraft that gained widespread acclaim for once being missing.

== Legend ==
- Civilian flight (private, commercial and cargo)
- Military flight (patrol, training, transport, etc.)

== List of aircraft ==
Date	Aircraft	People missing	Type of incident	Location	Remarks
March 23, 1921	Hydrogen balloon (A-5597)	5	Unknown	Gulf of Mexico off St. Andrews Bay (Florida)	Balloon found (without crew) on April 8, 1921.
December 21, 1923	Dixmude (Ex: Zeppelin LZ114)	49	Mid-air explosion following lightning strike (suspected)	Vicinity of Pantelleria, Italy en route from Gulf of Gabes	A total of 42 crew members and 7 passengers were initially reported missing by the French government, who issued its own series of reports of rumoured sightings of the airship. It wasn't until December 26, 1923, when debris & the body of Jean du Plessis de Grenédan (commander) were found in the sea near Sciacca, Sicily that the French government admitted to the loss. Information which included eyewitness accounts had been intentionally withheld for political reasons.
November 15, 1924	Fokker T.III (Fokker 4146)	2 (Artur de Sacadura Cabral & José Correia)	Crashed in fog (probable)	English Channel en route from Amsterdam to Lisbon	Aircraft debris (mechanical wreckage) from the seaplane was discovered on November 18, 1924.
September 7, 1927	Old Glory (Fokker F.VIIA)	3	Overloading (probable)	North Atlantic 960km E of Cape Race, Newfoundland	Wreckage was discovered by SS Kyle on September 12, 1927.
March 21, 1931	Avro 618 Ten (VH-UMF)	8	Severe weather	Snowy Mountains, Australia	1931 Avro Ten Southern Cloud disappearance. Flight disappeared en route from Sydney to Melbourne, with 6 passengers and 2 crew on board, despite wide search, including Charles Kingsford Smith who himself would disappear in 1935, no trace was found, until October 26, 1958, when it was located in deep bushland in the Snowy Mountains. Severe weather conditions were blamed for the accident.
July 31, 1936	Saro Cloud (G-ABXW)	10	Broke up at sea after landing following double engine failure	English Channel off Jersey	1936 Jersey Air Disaster; Wreckage found two weeks after the crash.
February 24, 1938	Vickers Wellesley (Type 292) (K7734)	3	Unknown	North Sea (last reported 80km (50m) east of Wick, Scotland en route to Shetland)	The flight crew consisted of Flt. Lt. F.S. Gardner (pilot), F/O G.J.D. Thomson & Sgt. G. Higgs, Long Range Development Unit. Debris was later found near Stavanger (Norway), the Air Ministry concluded that they were parts of the aircraft that went down.
August 16, 1942	L-8	2	Crew fell from blimp (probable)	Pacific Ocean in vicinity of San Francisco	Two navy officers, Lieutenant Ernest D. Cody and Ensign Charles D. Adams were on a routine anti-submarine patrol. Their airship was later spotted drifting back inland where it crashed with nobody aboard.
August 29, 1943	PV-1 Ventura	6	Engine failure, training flight in low-visibility conditions	Mount Baker, Washington State, USA	Wreckage found by a hiker in 1994
September 2, 1943	PBY-5A Catalina (A24-50)	10	Unknown	near Fakfak, Indonesia	RAAF aircraft failed to return from a mission to Sorong; all ten crew declared dead/MIA. Wreckage found in April 2018.
July 31, 1944	P-38 Lightning	1 (Antoine de Saint-Exupéry)	Unknown	Mediterranean Sea Collecting data on German troop movements in southern France	Famous for writing The Little Prince (Le Petit Prince). His bracelet was found by a fisherman in September 1998. Aircraft wreckage found in October 2003 and confirmed on July 4, 2004.
December 17, 1946	Douglas C-47 (NC88876)	7	Unknown	near Tilaran, Costa Rica	Non-scheduled flight from Kingston to San Jose. Wreckage found November 29, 1947.
August 2, 1947	Avro Lancastrian	11	CFIT due to severe weather conditions	Mount Tupungato, in the Argentine Andes	1947 BSAA Avro Lancastrian Star Dust accident Some wreckage found in 1998, additional wreckage found in 2000.
October 29, 1948	Lockheed Model 14 Super Electra	4	Crashed at sea	Tyrrhenian Sea off Elba	Wreckage found on March 22, 1954 during the search for BOAC Flight 781.
April 21, 1951	Antonov An-2	4	CFIT due to severe weather conditions and crew error	Aradan Ridge, Russia	1951 Aradan Aeroflot An-2 crash Wreckage located in August 2009 and positively identified on June 9, 2019.
September 28, 1952	Lisunov Li-2	7	Severe weather, turbulence	Kuznetsk Alatau, Russia	Wreckage located by accident in 1967.
March 27, 1963	Piper Tri-Pacer	2	Unknown	Dixie National Forest, Utah	On 27 March 1963, Wallace C. Halsey, founder of Christ Brotherhood (a UFO religious group) and his business associate Harry Cleveland Ross Jr. (a former mayor of Seal Beach, California) were flying a small Piper Tri-Pacer aircraft from Utah to Nevada. Ross, the pilot, was the operator of the Meadowlark Airport in Huntington Beach, California, and a veteran aviator with an airline transport rating. The plane was lost and remained so for 13 years despite an extensive air search and attempts by Halsey's UFO coreligionists to locate him using the aid of extraterrestrial beings who indicated the key to the mystery involved the Egyptian pyramids and the number 14. At the time, Halsey was facing federal charges and it was speculated by some that he had fled the country. The wreckage was discovered by a lost deer hunter in rugged mountainous country on 30 October 1976 approximately 30 air miles north of St. George, Utah, some 10–15 miles off the filed flight course. The bodies and wallets of both men were found inside the fuselage, which was crumpled but unburned.
April 23, 1966	Ilyushin Il-14 (CCCP-61772)	33	Double engine failure	South of Baku	Aeroflot Flight 2723; Wreckage found by accident a few months later; cause of engine failures never determined.
February 7, 1968	Antonov An-12	98	Unknown	Dhaka Glacier	1968 Indian Air Force An-12 crash Six bodies recovered from 2003 to 2018; wreckage found in 2018 and additional wreckage found in 2019.
May 23, 1969	Lockheed C-130 Hercules	1 (Sgt. Paul Meyer)	Theft	English Channel	1969 RAF Mildenhall C-130 theft Some small parts found a few days after the crash; wreck rediscovered in 2018.
January 25, 1971	Rockwell 1121 Jet Commander (N400CP)	5	Unknown	Over Lake Champlain, VT (presumed) en route from Burlington International Airport, VT to T. F. Green Airport, Providence, RI	Plane operated by Cousins Properties. Plane was found in May 2024.
October 13, 1972	Fairchild FH-227	45	CFIT due to pilot error	Remote Argentine Andes, near the border with Chile	Uruguayan Air Force Flight 571, the "Miracle of the Andes". Military aircraft chartered for civilian passenger transportation. 16 survivors.
August 10, 1984	Cessna O-1 Bird Dog (N4584A)	2	Low-altitude stall due to pilot error	Arapaho National Forest, Colorado (7 miles northeast of Tabernash)	Tabernash, Colorado § 1984 airplane crash. Wreckage was located by backpackers in August 1987, three years after the crash. Recovered videotape from the crash site showed that the pilot flew too close to the mountainous terrain, and stalled the plane while attempting to turn around.
September 3, 2007	American Champion Super Decathlon	1	Flight into terrain probably after encountering downdrafts	Sierra Nevada (USA)	Extensive search found no trace of the aircraft (although eight unrelated but previously unidentified crash sites were spotted during the search). More than a year after the disappearance, a hiker found ID cards of the pilot. Two days later, the crash site was spotted near the card-find location. A month later, remains were found that DNA tests identified as the pilot. See Steve Fossett.
1 June 2009	Air France Flight 447	228	Inadequate training and Pilot error	South Atlantic Ocean	Reported missing after the flight failed to contact air traffic control in Senegal and Cape Verde, where it was due to pass. Searches conducted by the Brazilian Air Force and a French reconnaissance aircraft were commenced with help from a Casa 235 from Spain and a P-3 Orion from the United States. The next day, signs of wreckage and an oil slick were spotted by a Brazilian Air Force Embraer R-99A, and on June 6, 2 bodies and other wreckage from the flight were recovered. These assured the investigators that the aircraft had, indeed, crashed with no survivors. The following day, the A330's vertical stabilizer was recovered, the first major piece of wreckage discovered. Pictures of the stabilizer being recovered became a poignant symbol of the loss of the Aircraft. After this, search for the missing Airbus had peaked, as the number of personnel mobilized by the Brazilian military exceeded 1100, and fifteen aircraft were devoted to the search mission. By 16 June 2009, 50 bodies had been recovered from a wide area of the ocean. They were transported to shore, and thereafter by air to Recife for identification. Meanwhile, the French nuclear submarine Émeraude was dispatched to retrieve the aircraft's Flight Data Recorders, or "Black boxes", however this was unsuccessful. Searches for the Black boxes continued until 2010, when the third phase ended without any success. A second search for the Black boxes was commenced in 2011, this time having the flight data recorder chassis found, and the memory unit recovered shortly after. This search also recovered an additional 104 bodies from the wreckage, bringing the total number of bodies found to 154. The final report stated that a combination of iced-over pitot tubes (airspeed sensors), pilot error, and confusion following the autopilot's disconnection were to blame for the crash.
28 December 2014	Indonesia AirAsia Flight 8501	162	Mishandled non-critical failure leading to stall	Java Sea	
July 22, 2016	Antonov An-32 (K2743)	29	Crashed at sea	Bay of Bengal	2016 Indian Air Force An-32 crash Debris found January 12, 2024 140 nautical miles off the Chennai coast confirmed to be from the aircraft.

== See also ==
- List of missing aircraft, for aircraft that have never been recovered
