= CII =

CII or Cii may refer to:

- 102 (number) in Roman numerals
- Calculated Ignition Index, an index of the ignition quality of fuel oil
- Caldera International, Inc., a software company between 2001 and 2002
- Centro Intelligence Interforze, an Italian intelligence agency
- Chaîne d'Information Internationale, former name of TV station France 24
- Chartered Insurance Institute
- Children's Institute International, a child-abuse organisation in Los Angeles
- Coláiste Íde agus Iosef, a school in County Limerick, Ireland
- Colour Index International
- Compagnie internationale pour l'informatique, French computer manufacturer
- Computer-implemented inventions, see software patent
- Confederation of Indian Industry
- Construction Industry Institute
- Core Infrastructure Initiative, a project started by the Linux Foundation to fund critical open source projects
- Council of Islamic Ideology, Pakistan Government
- Cross Industry Invoice, a technical specification developed in UN/CEFACT for creating message syntax used in global exchange between trading partners
- George M. Low Center for Industrial Innovation, a research center at Rensselaer Polytechnic Institute

== See also ==
- C2 (disambiguation), including a list of topics named C.II, etc.
