= Vitamin C2 =

Vitamin C2 or Vitamin C_{2} is not a widely recognized term in modern scientific classification. However, it has been historically or erroneously used to refer to various substances, including:

- A proprietary trademarked name for a combination of calcium ascorbate and ascorbyl palmitate, marketed as a blend of "water-soluble" and "fat-soluble" vitamin C.
- Vitamin P, a historical term once used for certain bioflavonoids, though they are not classified as true vitamins. This term was used circa 1948 or earlier.
- Vitamin J which was used circa 1935. Vitamin J was an earlier term for choline.
- Aesculin (also known as Esculin), a compound sometimes referred to as "Vitamin C2" in older databases, though this designation is not widely accepted.
