= Kawasaki C2 =

Kawasaki C2SS and C2TR
- Manufacturer: Kawasaki
- Also called: Road Runner
- Parent company: Kawasaki Heavy Industries
- Production: 1964-1969
- Successor: G4TR Trail Boss
- Class: Street and trail
- Engine: Air-cooled 100cc, single cylinder, two stroke, rotary disc valve
- Transmission: Chain driven 4-speed, constant mesh, rotary shift. Kick start.
- Suspension: Inner spring telescopic front fork, spring shock absorber and swing arm (rear)
- Wheelbase: 45.7 in
- Dimensions: L: 71.3 in W: 20.4 in
- Fuel capacity: 1.7 gal

The Kawasaki C2SS 120 and C2TR 120 Roadrunner were 120 cc (7.3 cu in) Kawasaki motorcycles made from 1964 to 1969.

The C2SS was designed as a street scrambler; a road machine powered by a single cylinder, two stroke, rotary disc valve engine with a displacement of 115cc. It was street legal having a headlight, taillight, and license plate bracket. It had [stainless steel] fenders front and rear, a crossbar on the handlebars, universal tires, an upswept right side chrome exhaust system, and apparent good ground clearance. The bike was available in either red, blue, or silver with the fuel tank having rubber knee grips.

== C2TR ==
In 1967, the C2SS could be converted into a C2TR trail machine by easily installing the Trail Kit, which the manufacturer supplied as optional parts.

In 1968 the C2SS was renamed the C2TR apparently indicating an off-road capability. It had a new style fuel tank design without rubber knee grips, a contrasting "Kawasaki" decal covering the entire side of the tank, a raised front fender, a rear rack for small amounts of cargo, and 4-speed transmission with high and low gearing via 2 rear sprockets changed manually.

In 1969 the C2TR had 8 speeds (4 actual speeds) through a unique high/low range gearing switch rather than a rear sprocket change.

In 1970, the C2TR was replaced by the smaller 100cc Kawasaki G4TR Trail Boss with 10 speeds (5 actual speeds) through a unique high/low range gearing switch rather than sprocket change.
