= William Reid =

William Reid may refer to:

== Politicians ==
- William Allan Reid (1865–1952), British Conservative Party member of parliament for Derby 1931–1945
- William Earl Reid (1934–2013), politician in British Columbia, Canada
- William Ferguson Reid (born 1925), Virginia physician, politician and civil rights activist
- William Henry Reid (1846–1912), Ontario farmer and political figure
- William Reid (British politician) (1889–1965), United Kingdom member of parliament for Glasgow Provan 1955–1964
- William Reid (New York politician) (1827–1906), American manufacturer and politician from New York
- Will Reid (William Reid, 1858–1922), American politician, writer, and editor

== Sportspeople ==
- William Reid (basketball) (1893–1955), basketball coach and administrator
- William Reid (rugby league), rugby league footballer of the 1910s for England, and Widnes
- William Reid (Scottish cricketer) (1893–1949)
- William Reid (South Australia cricketer) (1867–1943), Australian cricketer
- William Reid (Tasmania cricketer) (1882–1950), Tasmania cricketer
- Bill Reid (American football coach) (William Thomas Reid Jr., 1878–1976), American football player and coach
- Bill Reid (center) (William John Reid (born 1952), American football player
- Billy Reid (baseball) (William Alexander Reid (1857–1940), American baseball player
- Billy Reid (basketball) (William Jennings Reid Jr., born 1957), American basketball coach and player.
- Billy Reid (footballer, born 1963) (William Reid, born 1963), Scottish footballer and football coach
- Billy Reid (footballer, born 1986) (William Reid Jr., born 1986), Scottish footballer
- Willie Reid (footballer, died 1975) (William Reid), Scottish football player and manager
- Willie Reid (footballer, born 1884) (William Reid, 1884–1964), Scottish football player and manager
- Willie Reid (footballer, born 1903) (William Walkinshaw Reid, 1903–1967), footballer from Northern Ireland

== Others ==
- William Reid (British Army officer) (1791–1858), British soldier and governor of the Bermudas, Windward Islands, and Malta
- Sir William Reid (civil servant) (born 1931), British former parliamentary and health serviceombudsman
- William Reid (mining engineer) (1906–1985), Scottish coal expert and co-author of the "Reid Report" on the state of British coal-mining
- William Reid (musician) (born 1958), guitarist with The Jesus and Mary Chain
- William Reid (Scottish businessman) (1842–?), early financier of railroads in Oregon's Willamette Valley
- William Reid (VC) (1921–2001), Scottish World War II war hero
- William Arbuckle Reid (1933–2015), British educator, curriculum theorist, and philosophical disciple of Joseph Schwab
- William Hamilton Reid (died 1826), British poet and hack writer
- William P. Reid (1854–1932), Scottish locomotive engineer
- William Reid (military historian) (1926–2014), Scottish military historian
- William Reid (psychiatrist), American forensic psychiatrist
- William S. Reid (1778–1853), vice president and acting president of Hampden–Sydney College
- William Reid IV, American lawyer
- Gordon Reid (priest) (William Gordon Reid, born 1942), Anglican priest, former dean of Gibraltar and vicar general of the Diocese of Europe
- Bill Reid (William Ronald Reid Jr., 1920–1998), Haida artist
- Billy Reid (British songwriter) (William Gordon Reid, 1902–1974), English songwriter, bandleader, pianist and accordionist
- Billy Reid (Canadian songwriter) (William Edward Reid, born 1977), Canadian television and podcasting personality
- Billy Reid (Irish republican) (William Reid, 1939–1971), member of the Belfast Brigade of the Provisional Irish Republican Army

== Characters ==
- William Reid, a character in Criminal Minds

== See also ==
- William Reed (disambiguation)
- William Reade (disambiguation)
- William Rede (disambiguation)
- William Read (disambiguation)
- Billy Reid (disambiguation)
- Willie Reid (disambiguation)
