= Billy Reid =

Bill or Billy Reid may refer to:

== Sports ==
=== Association football ===
- Billy Reid (footballer, 1938–2021), Scottish footballer
- Billy Reid (footballer, born 1963), Scottish football player and manager
- Billy Reid (footballer, born 1986), his son, Scottish footballer who played for Clyde
- Bill Reid (center) (born 1952), American football center
- Bill Reid (American football coach) (1878–1976)

=== Other sports ===
- Billy Reid (baseball) (1857–1940), Canadian baseball player
- Billy Reid (basketball) (born 1957), American professional player

== Others ==
- Billy Reid (British songwriter) (1902–1974), British orchestra leader and songwriter
- Billy Reid (Canadian songwriter) (born 1977), Canadian television and podcasting personality
- Billy Reid (fashion designer) (born 1964), American, born in Louisiana
- Billy Reid (Irish republican) (1939–1971), member of the Provisional Irish Republican Army
- Billy Edwin Reid (born 1959), American suspected serial killer
- Bill Reid (1920–1998), Canadian Haida artist

== See also ==
- William Reid (disambiguation)
- Billy Reed (1928–2003), footballer
- Billy Reed (baseball) (1922–2005), American Major League Baseball player
