= William Reed =

William, Will, Willie, Bill, or Billy Reed may refer to:

== Arts and entertainment ==
- William Reed (Canadian musician) (1859–1945), Canadian organist, conductor, and composer
- William Maxwell Reed (1871–1962), American writer of science books for children
- William Henry Reed (1876–1942), English violinist and author of Elgar as I Knew Him
- William Reed (English composer) (1910–2002), English composer

== Law and politics ==
- William Reed (British colonial official) (c. 1670–1728), acting governor of North-Carolina
- William Reed (politician) (1776–1837), United States representative from Massachusetts
- William Bradford Reed (1806–1876), American politician and journalist
- William W. Reed (1825–1916), American politician in Wisconsin
- William B. Reed (politician) (1833–1909), American politician in Connecticut
- William Samuel Reed (1864–1941), Canadian politician
- William L. Reed (politician) (born 1866), American politician in Massachusetts
- William Decatur Reed (1815–1858), American lawyer, politician, and public official in Kentucky
- William O. Reed (1902–1969), American politician and lawyer, member of the Texas House of Representatives

== Sports ==
- William R. Reed (c. 1915–1971), American college athletics administrator
- Billy Reed (baseball) (1922–2005), American baseball player
- Billy Reed (footballer) (1928–2003), Welsh international footballer
- Bill Reed (born 1954), Canadian ice hockey defenceman
- William Reed (sprinter, born 1970), American sprinter
- William Reed (sprinter, born 2005), Marshallese sprinter
- Willie Reed (born 1990), American basketball player
- Will Reed (born 2001), Welsh rugby union player

== Others ==
- William Reed (author) (1830–1920), American science theorist, author of The Phantom of the Poles
- William Reed (publisher) (1830–1920), English trade magazine publisher
- William Reed (RAF officer) (born 1896), British World War I flying ace
- William Reed (Medal of Honor) (1839–1918), American soldier and Medal of Honor recipient
- William Norman Reed (1917–1944), American fighter ace and Army Air Corps lieutenant colonel
- William Harlow Reed (1848–1915), American fossil collector and pioneer

== Other uses ==
- Will Reed Farm House, historic American farmhouse in Arkansas
- William Reed Ltd, a publisher of trade publications

== See also ==
- Billie Reed, fictional character in the TV drama Days of Our Lives
- William Reade (disambiguation)
- William Read (disambiguation)
- William Reid (disambiguation)
- William Rede (disambiguation)
