= Andy Walker (journalist) =

Canadian journalist

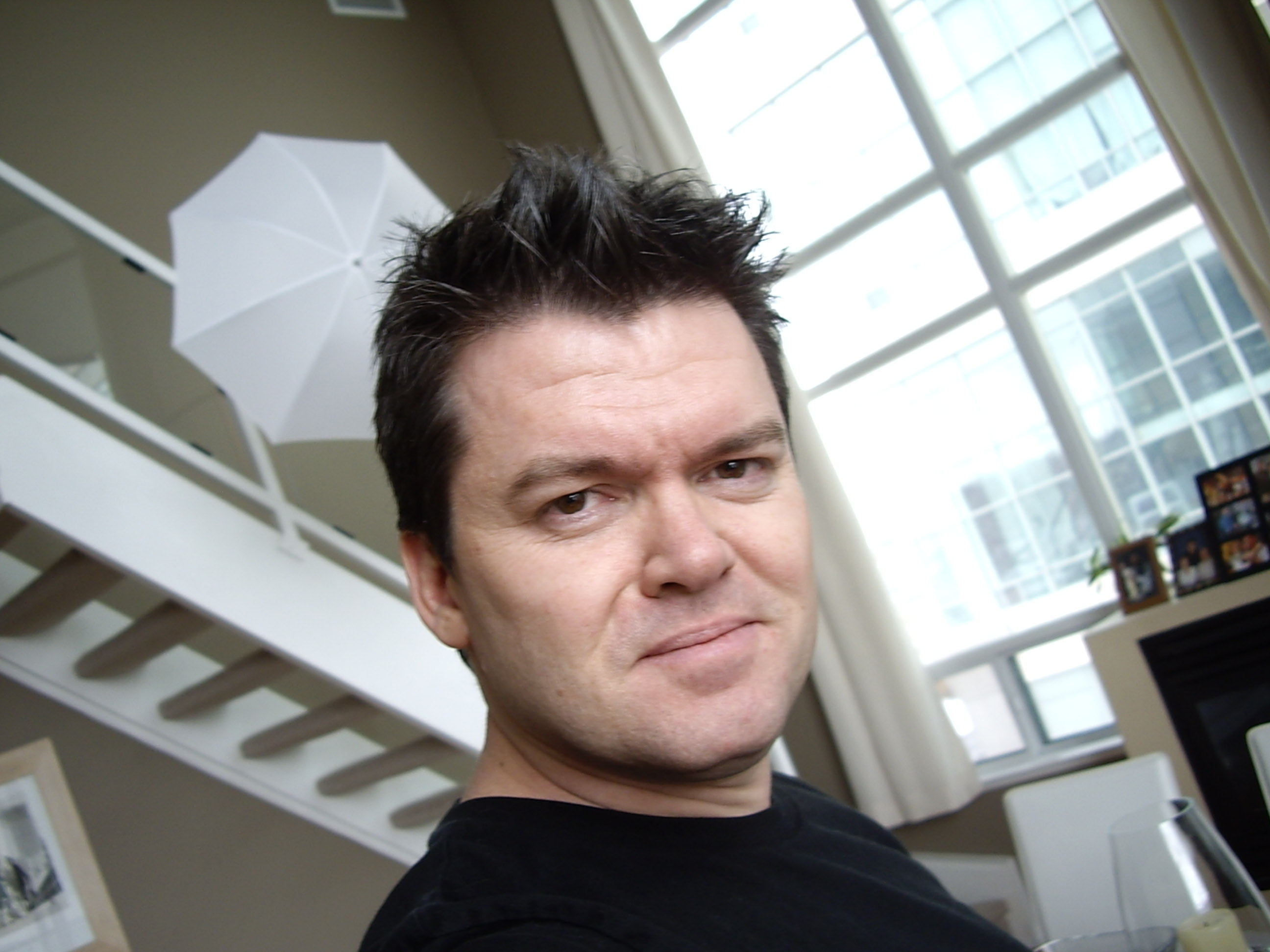
- Andy Walker TV Personality in 2007.
- Born: Norwich, England

Andy Walker is a Canadian television personality and journalist.

He is best known as having been a co-host alongside Leo Laporte and Amber MacArthur of Call for Help, a technology help television program on G4techTV Canada in Canada and the HOW TO Channel in Australia. His most popular segments on the show were what he called "food demos" which use household groceries like cheese and whip cream to show how complex technology mechanisms work. In one show he built a transistor out of cheddar cheese and tomato juice.

Walker is also the owner of Cyberwalker.com , a technology advice website, and the author of The Absolute Beginner's Guide to Security, Spam, Spyware and Viruses and Windows Vista Help Desk both from Que Books. He also co-authored the book You Call This the Future? (Chicago Review Press) with Nick Sagan and Mark Frary.

In December 2013, Walker announced he had signed deal with Pearson Education to write his 5th book called Super You: How Technology is Revolutionizing What it Means to Be Human. It was co-authored with blogger/entrepreneur Kay Svela (AwesomeLifeClub.com; DeathisObsolete.comDepression Zone) and Walker's longtime collaborator Sean Carruthers. Super You was published in June 2016. Walker was married to Svela in July 2014. They have a boy Carter Devon Walker, born in February 2014.

Besides channelling his two most recent books toward transhumanism and hyper longevity, Walker is also working as a futurist keynote speaker.

== Background ==
On August 31, 2005, after hosting Call for Help with Leo Laporte for over a year, Walker announced that he was leaving the show due to an unsatisfactory pay cut in his proposed contract renewal.

Walker hosted two spin-offs to Call For Help called Web Gems and My Media. Web Gems focused on tips and tricks on navigating the Internet. My Media was focused on TV and living room technology. Both shows aired on G4techTV Canada until late 2006. He appeared as one of the first guests on Leo Laporte's old television show The Lab with Leo Laporte, which started production in Vancouver, British Columbia, Canada in April 2007 and aired in May 2007 on G4techTV Canada in Canada and the HOW TO Channel in Australia. Walker also co-hosted an internet technology podcast called Lab-Rats with Sean Carruthers until late 2011. But in 2012, Andy Walker and Sean Carruthers once again started the Lab Rats podcast which can be found at Lab Rats.

In January 2013, it was announced that Walker would be a recipient of the Queen Elizabeth II's Diamond Jubilee Medal. Walker's community service includes founder of the Little Geeks Foundation, a national Canadian non-profit charity that provides computers to school children from families in need. Walker also serves as a technology advisor to His Honour David Onley on his aboriginal children literacy initiative. Walker was also a technology advisor to Kids Help Phone, a national 24-hour telephone and online counselling service for children.
