= Willie Reid (disambiguation) =

Willie Reid may refer to:

- Willie Mae Reid (born 1928), American politician
- Willie Reid (American football) (born 1982), American football player
- Willie Reid (footballer, died 1975) (c.1917–1975), Scottish football manager
- Willie Reid (footballer, born 1884) (1884–1964), Scottish international footballer and manager
- Willie Reid (footballer, born 1903) (1903–1967), Irish footballer

== See also ==
- Willie Read (1885–1972), Royal Air Force officer
- Willie Reed (born 1990), American professional basketball
- Willis Reed (1942–2023), American professional basketball player
- William Reid (disambiguation)
