= William Read =

William Read may refer to:

- William Read (priest), Archdeacon of Barnstaple, 1679–1703
- William Read (oculist) (1648–1715), quack medical practitioner
- William Read (pirate) (died 1701), pirate active in the Indian Ocean near Madagascar
- William Brown Read (1817–1880), American politician and lawyer from Kentucky
- William Henry Macleod Read (1819–1909), British businessman and public servant in Singapore
- William Read (Australian politician) (1882–1974), Australian politician
- William Ronald Read (1885–1972), British Royal Air Force officer of the First World War
- William L. Read, American meteorologist

== See also ==
- William Reid (disambiguation)
- William Reed (disambiguation)
- William Read Scurry (1821–1864), General in the Confederate States Army in the American Civil War
- William Read Miller (1823–1887), Democratic Governor of the State of Arkansas
- William Rede (disambiguation)
- William Reade (disambiguation)
