= RAF Upavon =

Former Royal Air Force station in Wiltshire, England

RAF Upavon
- Near Upavon, Wiltshire in England
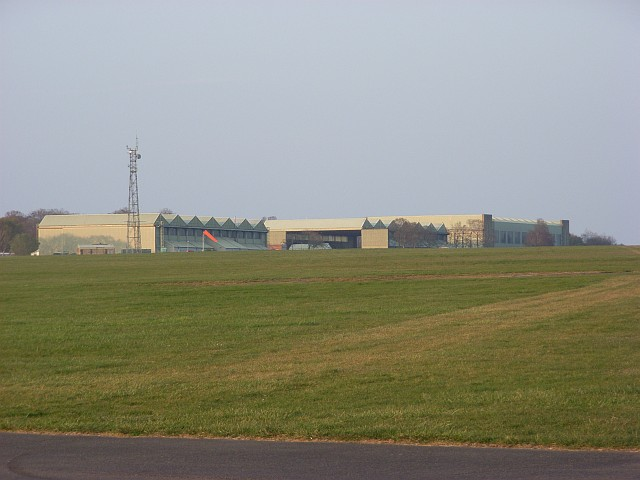
- The airfield at former RAF Upavon, 2007

Site information
- Type: Royal Air Force station
- Owner: Ministry of Defence
- Operator: Royal Flying Corps (1914–1918); Royal Air Force (1918–1993)
- Condition: Closed

Location
- Location in Wiltshire
- Coordinates: 51°17′26″N 001°46′42″W

Site history
- Built: 1912
- In use: 1912–1993
- Fate: Transferred to the British Army and became Trenchard Lines.

Airfield information
- Identifiers: IATA: UPV, ICAO: EGDJ, WMO: 03744
- Elevation: 175 metres (574 ft) AMSL
Runways
Direction	Length and surface
05/23	Grass
08/26	Grass
18/36	Grass

Royal Air Force Upavon, or more simply RAF Upavon, is a former Royal Air Force station in Wiltshire, England. It was a grass airfield, military flight training school, and administrative headquarters of the Royal Air Force. The station opened in 1912 and closed in 1993, when it was transferred to the British Army and became known as Trenchard Lines.

The station motto was In Principio Et Semper, and translated from Latin means "In the Beginning and Always".

== History ==
=== Origins and construction ===
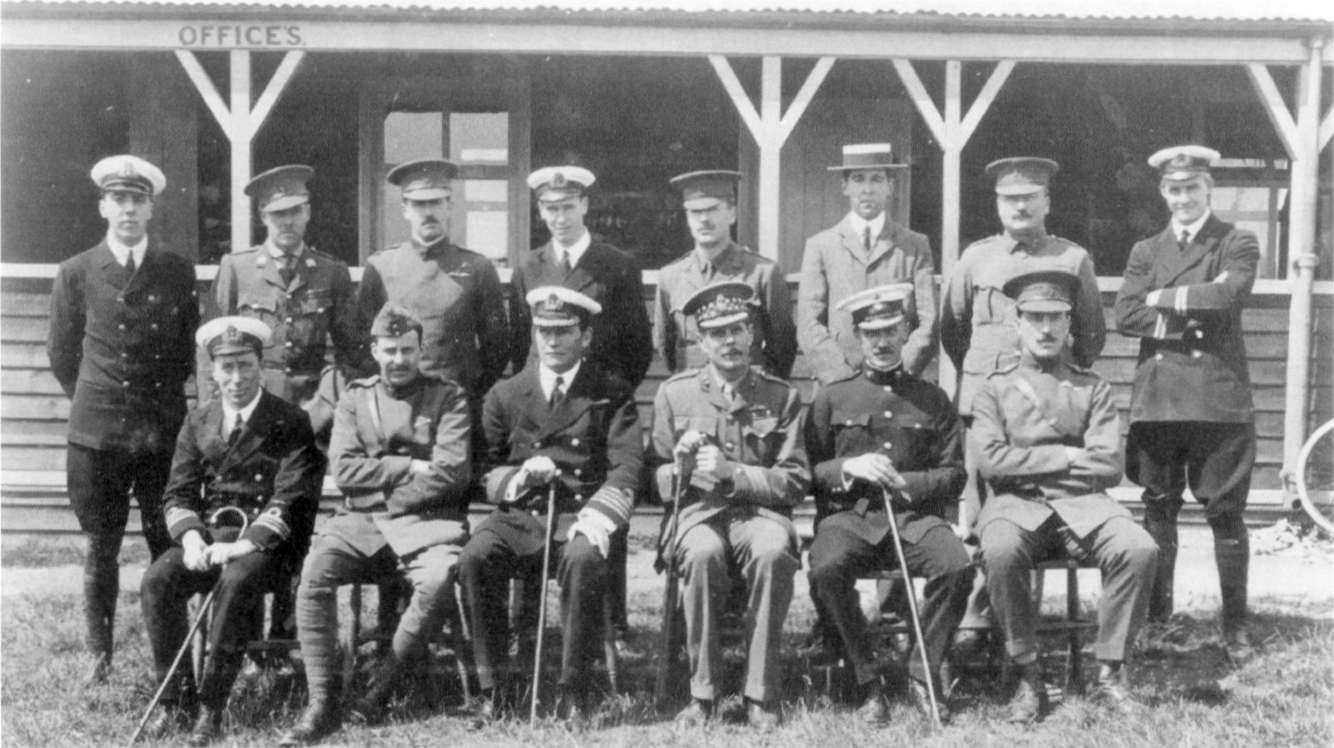
Central Flying School staff taken at Upavon, January 1913

Construction began on 19 June 1912, on some training gallops, on an elevated site about 1.5 mi (2.4 km) east of Upavon village, near the edge of the Salisbury Plain, in the English county of Wiltshire. Upavon Airfield was originally created for pilots of the military and naval wings of the newly formed Royal Flying Corps (RFC), and became home to the Army Central Flying School. Captain Godfrey M Paine, RN, became the first commandant, with Major Hugh Trenchard being his assistant. Trenchard later became the chief of air staff, and subsequently became known as the "father of the Royal Air Force".

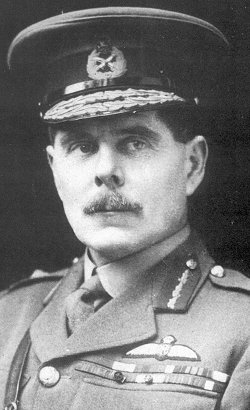
Trenchard in the uniform of the Royal Flying Corps

=== Early flying developments ===
During 1913 the first night landing made in England was achieved at Upavon, by Lieutenant Cholmondeley. In May 1914, Winston Churchill, then First Lord of the Admiralty, was a passenger on a flight by a Farman MF.7 biplane while visiting Upavon. Two officers of the CFS at Upavon developed the bomb sight between 1914–1915, and this was used in a very successful manner at the Western Front. The first Unmanned Aerial Target aircraft were tested on the site on 21 March 1917, witnessed by 30–40 allied generals. The officers' mess, a Grade II* listed building, was completed in 1915.

=== Birth of the Royal Air Force ===
On 1 April 1918, the Royal Flying Corps (RFC) amalgamated with the Royal Naval Air Service to create the Royal Air Force, and Upavon became Royal Air Force Station Upavon, commonly abbreviated to RAF Upavon. Accordingly, the former RFC Central Flying School became the Central Flying School.

During 1926 the Central Flying School moved from Upavon. At the same time, No.17 (Fighter) Squadron RAF moved to Upavon to join No.3 (Fighter) Squadron RAF, who had been at Upavon since 1924. For the next eight years, the two fighter squadrons developed both night flying and aviation fighting techniques. At the same time, they wooed the public all over the country with impressive air displays. In May 1934, both squadrons left Upavon for RAF Kenley, London, and were replaced at Upavon, for a short time in 1935, by four squadrons from the Fleet Air Arm.

=== The St. Raphael ===
On 31 August 1927 Lieutenant Colonel Frederick F. Minchin, known to his colleagues as 'Dan', Captain Leslie Hamilton, and Princess Löwenstein-Wertheim took off from Upavon airfield in a Dutch Fokker F.VIIA named the St. Raphael in a bid to become the first aviators to cross the Atlantic from east to west. The St. Raphael was last sighted some 800 mi (1,300 km) west of Galway heading for Newfoundland. The aircraft was never seen again and the fate of Minchin, Hamilton and Löwenstein-Wertheim remains a mystery.

=== Second World War ===
During August 1935, the Central Flying School was to return to Upavon and stayed there until it moved to RAF Little Rissington in Gloucestershire in April 1942. During this crucial period, the school's primary role was to train and supply flight instructors to the now increasing number of military flying schools. King George VI visited Upavon during the Second World War.

=== Post-war ===
Upavon became home to headquarters No. 38 Group in 1946 and home to headquarters RAF Transport Command in 1951. A new headquarters building for Transport Command was completed in the 1960s. On 16 June 1962, Upavon held a static and flying display, attended by Prince Philip, to mark the 50th anniversary of the Royal Flying Corps. Transport Command was renamed Air Support Command on 1 August 1967.

With the contraction of the RAF, Air Support Command only lasted a short time as a command, and it was absorbed into Strike Command on 1 September 1972. The grass runway was not wholly appropriate for heavy fixed-wing aircraft, nor any kind of jet aircraft, and so the airfield was used as an administrative base and also became the home of No. 622 Volunteer Gliding Squadron, part of the Air Training Corps, who used static winch-launched gliders.

=== Post-RAF use ===
As a result of major reorganisation of the Royal Air Force in the early 1990s, RAF Upavon became surplus to requirements, and the RAF was to permanently withdraw from Upavon. On 3 August 1993, the RAF handed over the site to the British Army and the airfield became an Army garrison called Trenchard Lines. When the army first moved into Upavon, it became home to Headquarters Doctrine & Training. On 30 January 1995, it then became Headquarters Adjutant General.

In April 2008 HQ Adjutant General was absorbed within the newly formed HQ Land Forces under 'Project Hyperion'. The new merged HQ LF was to be at Andover to use surplus real estate made available by Defence Equipment and Support. The two organisations merged organisationally on 1 April 2008, but preparing the Marlborough Lines buildings at Andover for physical co-location was not expected to be possible before 2010. The site is now home to the headquarters of Army Recruiting and Initial Training Command.

== Station commanders ==
=== Royal Flying Corps ===
1912–1915	Captain G M Paine
1915–1916	Lieutenant Colonel D Le G Pitcher
1916	Lieutenant Colonel C J Burke
1916–1917	Captain A C H MacLean
1917–1918	Lieutenant Colonel A J L Scott

=== Royal Air Force ===
1918	Major J C Slessor
1918–1919	Captain H Maintjes MC
1919	Lieutenant Colonel P H L Playfair MC
1919–1920	Wing Commander C D Breese AFC
1920	Wing Commander P K Wise CMG DSO
1920–1922	Wing Commander N D K MacEwen CMG DSO
1922–1923	Air Commodore E A D Masterman CMG CBE AFC
1923–1925	Group Captain F V Holt CMG DSO
1926–1926	Group Captain W R Freeman DSO MC
1926–1928	Wing Commander V S Brown
1928–1930	Wing Commander W R Read MC DFC AFC
1930–1932	Wing Commander E W Norton DSC
1932–1934	Wing Commander G S M Insall VC MC
1934–1935	Wing Commander A D Pryor
1935–1936	Group Captain H G Smart CBE DFC AFC
1936–1939	Group Captain J M Robb DSO DFC
1939–1940	Wing Commander D W F Bonham-Carter
1940	Wing Commander G H Stainforth AFC
1940	Air Commodore J M Robb DSO DFC
1940–1942	Group Captain H H Down AFC
1942–1944	Group Captain A J Holmes AFC
1944–1946	Group Captain E A C Britton DFC
1946	Squadron Leader Parker
1948	Squadron Leader W McGregor
1948	Squadron Leader S J Rawlins
1950–1951	Squadron Leader M P Thompson
1952–1954	Squadron Leader D T Lees MC
1954–1956	Squadron Leader L J Hill
1956–1958	Squadron Leader K H Steel OBE
1958–1959	Squadron Leader C G Lewis
1959–1961	Squadron Leader R P James MBE
1961–1964	Squadron Leader R R McGowan AFC
1964–1966	Squadron Leader T A Warren
1966–1969	Squadron Leader N Comber
1969–1971	Squadron Leader M Gill
1971–1973	Squadron Leader H C Burrows
1973	Group Captain R S Bradley
1973–1974	Wing Commander J R Shepherd
1974–1975	Wing Commander W G Wood
1975–1977	Squadron Leader J E Dixon
1977–1979	Squadron Leader A R J Pascall
1979–1980	Squadron Leader R A Betteridge
1980–1983	Squadron Leader M Pritchard
1983–1986	Squadron Leader K W Baldock
1986–1989	Squadron Leader D N Barnes
1989–1991	Squadron Leader C F Shaw
1991–1993	Squadron Leader R I Clifford MIMgt

== Aircraft ==
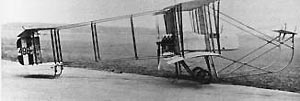
A French Farman MF.7 biplane of No.2 Sqn Royal Flying Corps

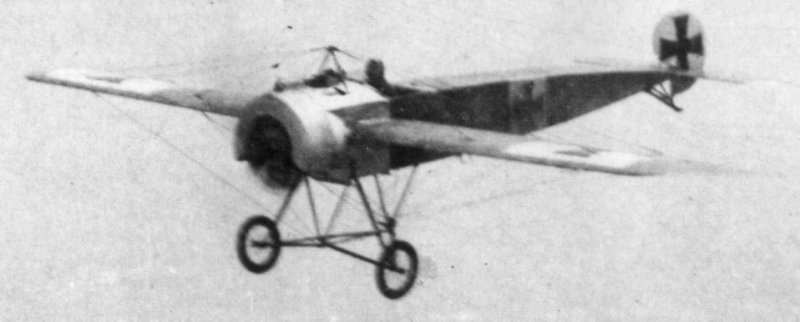
Captured Fokker E.III 210/16 being flown at Upavon, Wiltshire in 1916

- Farman MF.7 biplane
- Fokker E.III
- Grob 103 Viking TX.1 – No. 622 Volunteer Gliding Squadron

== Units ==
Units based at RAF Upavon included:

- No. 1 Group RAF
- No. 3 Squadron RAF
- No. 7 Flying Instructors School RAF
- No. 7 Flying Instructors School (Advanced) RAF
- No. 9 Squadron RAF
- No. 15 Joint Services Trials Unit RAF
- No. 17 Joint Services Trials Unit RAF
- No. 17 Squadron RAF
- No. 38 (Air Support) Group RAF
- No. 38 Group Air Transport Examining Unit RAF
- No. 38 Group Communications Flight RAF
- No. 38 Group Examining Unit RAF
- No. 38 Group Standardisation Unit RAF
- No. 46 Group RAF
- No. 46 Group Air Transport Examining Unit RAF
- No. 54 Squadron RAF
- No. 72 Squadron RAF
- No. 73 Squadron RAF
- No. 85 Squadron RAF
- No. 87 Squadron RAF
- 104th Aero Squadron
- No. 230 Squadron RAF
- No. 248 Maintenance Unit RAF
- No. 408 (Fleet Fighter) Flight RAF
- No. 622 Gliding School RAF
- No. 622 Volunteer Gliding School RAF
- 800 Naval Air Squadron
- 801 Naval Air Squadron
- 802 Naval Air Squadron
- 810 Naval Air Squadron
- 820 Naval Air Squadron
- 821 Naval Air Squadron
- 823 Naval Air Squadron
- 824 Naval Air Squadron
- No. 1310 (Transport) Flight RAF
- No. 1537 (Beam Approach Training) Flight RAF
- No. 2783 Squadron RAF Regiment
- Central Flying School
- Experimental Flight, Upavon RAF
- Flying Instructors School, Upavon RAF
- Flying Officers' Instructors School RAF
- Handling Flight RAF
- Meteorological Flight RAF
- Moonrakers Gliding Club
- Southern Command (AGA) Gliding Club
- Testing Flight/Squadron RAF
- Transport Command Communication Flight RAF
- Transport Command Communication Squadron RAF
- Western Communication Squadron RAF
- Wyvern Gliding Club

== See also ==
- List of former Royal Air Force stations

== Sources ==
- Lake, A. (1999). Flying units of the RAF. Shrewsbury, Shropshire, UK: Airlife. ISBN 1-84037-086-6.
- Jefford, C.G. (1988). RAF Squadrons, a Comprehensive Record of the Movement and Equipment of all RAF Squadrons and their Antecedents since 1912. Shrewsbury, Shropshire, UK: Airlife Publishing. ISBN 1-84037-141-2.
