= Squeaky Bean =

British vegan food company

- Type: Private
- Industry: Vegan Food
- Founded: 2018; 8 years ago
- Headquarters: Redhill, Surrey, United Kingdom
- Products: Meat analogue
- Owner: The Compleat Food group
- Number of employees: 200+
- Website: www.squeakybean.co.uk

Squeaky Bean is a British vegan food company and began trading in 2019. It is owned by the British food manufacture company Winterbotham Darby and is based in Redhill, Surrey, United Kingdom. The company experienced rapid expansion from just three products into a multiproduct brand stocked in British supermarkets. The brand significantly expanded its distribution capabilities following the growth and receiving millions of pounds worth of investment. In 2021, it was reported that the brand had amassed a turnover of £7.5 million.

== History ==
Squeaky Bean is known for creating vegan deli slices and chicken-style pieces from plant-based ingredients. Despite the "Squeaky Bean" brand name, beans are not a main ingredient in their products. It is wholly owned by chilled foods manufacturing company, Winterbotham Darby. It is an acquisition of PAI Partners and together with Addo Food Group they form The Compleat Food Group. Squeaky Bean products were originally produced at a food production facility in the Netherlands for sale in the UK.

Squeaky Bean officially began trading with sales of produce in January 2019. The brand originally launched with three SKUs: satay kievs, fishless fingers and nuggets. In a press release, Squeaky Bean's promotional team stated that they were "inspired" by vegan options while dining out, but were "bored" by vegan foods in supermarkets. Their business strategy was to bring "childhood favourites" to the supermarkets and give vegans more "indulgent" food choices. Squeaky Bean try to recreate the taste and appearance of real meat, with Augustine stating "it's a misconception that vegans and vegetarians don’t want to eat products that taste and look like meat." The brand has created junk food options to attract consumers not interested in the healthy lifestyle aspect traditionally associated with the vegan food category.

Squeaky Bean changed its branding, logo and packaging in their second year of trading. They also ceased use of their "100% dirty vegan" slogan. They also launched a range of ready-to-eat products. The company experienced rapid growth in its early years of trading, especially in 2021. In 2020, the brand received a £6 million investment and opened its first British manufacturing site in Bicester. Squeaky Bean's distribution increased five fold that year. In November 2020, the brand significantly expanded its range with six new products. In 2021, food industry magazine The Grocer valued Squeaky Bean's annual sales at £7.5 million. Vegan food sales continued to rise and Squeaky Bean struggled to meet demand. The company reported a sales increase of 222% year-on-year sales for the month of January 2021. In 2021, Winterbotham Darby invested £5 million in a second manufacturing site in Milton Keynes to expand their supply power.

During the COVID-19 pandemic, the brand launched the "Squeaky Bean Plant-Based Box". The venture was a home delivery service which offered consumers a box of plant-based products during lockdowns. In 2020, they added a potato tortilla to their range. In May 2021, the company expanded into manufacturing dipping sauces. They launched three new dips in a partnership with The Co-operative Group. In June 2021, Squeaky Bean partnered with fellow vegan brand Crackd for a new product launch. Crackd produces a vegan egg alternative, which Squeaky Bean began using in their Scotch egg style product. In October 2021, Squeaky Bean announced their continued expansion in the deli-style slices category, via a deal with Sainsburys. Squeaky Bean's focus on lunchbox snacks was to promote a "plant hour" initiative, in which more people eat vegan food on their lunch breaks. In November 2021, it was announced that Squeaky Bean had created their first vegan cheese product, a New Yorker–style sandwich filling. It was also the first time a vegan brand had packaged a meat substitute and vegan cheese together. In 2022, their parent company Winterbotham Darby, listed the brand as selling twenty SKUs in more than four major British supermarkets.

In February 2021, for its work on Squeaky Bean, Winterbotham Darby won the "Plant-Based Manufacturing Company of the Year" accolade at the Food Manufacture Excellence awards. In September 2021, Squeaky Bean created a publicity stunt when it partnered with social media influencers to create an online project in the style of a reality television series. Squeaky Bean created the "Squeaky House" inside a mansion and moved seven influencers into the house. There they lived and competed with each other in vegan-themed cooking challenges.
