= Billy Reid (Canadian songwriter) =

Canadian television presenter

- Born: William Edward Reid; April 10, 1977 (age 49); Victoria, British Columbia, Canada

YouTube information
- Channel: Pancake Manor – Kids Songs
- Subscribers: 3.22 million
- Views: 3.33 billion
- Last updated: October 30, 2025
- Website: pancakemanor.com

William Edward Reid (born April 10, 1977) is a Canadian television and podcasting personality. He is known for his music and comedy videos on the World Wide Web and for his musical children's series "Pancake Manor," with over 3.22 billion views. Billy Reid is also a musician, filmmaker, voice actor, and former TV host. Billy Reid was born in Victoria, British Columbia.

== Film and television ==
Billy Reid is also among the first group of internet personalities to make a transition from the internet into network television. Along with Lara Doucette of Tiki Bar TV, Billy hosted the Canadian series Exposure, a show that featured the best viral videos from the internet, part of the 2007 summer/fall lineup on the CBC. In March 2008, Reid was one of the first YouTubers invited by the YouTube staff to edit the homepage and choose the featured videos.

Reid collaborated with YouTubers Rhett and Link for "T-Shirt War" a commercial in which they used 222 T-shirts with unique designs. "T-shirt War" won in Best Online Promotion at the Apparel Industry category at the 2010 Spirit Awards. Following the success of the original, Reid and the original crew were hired to produce a national television and cinema spot for McDonald's and Coca-Cola with the same T-shirt War theme. The commercial was also uploaded on YouTube and entitled "T-shirt War 2.” Billy created the art direction, design, as well as the sound effects for both videos.

Billy Reid also collaborated again with Rhett and Link on Brink, hosted by Josh Zepps, on the Science Channel. They created three music videos Space Junk, Robot Girlfriend, and Hello – The Seti Song. He created art and animation for all three videos. He also produced, co-wrote, provided vocals on "Hello – The Seti Song."

In the spring of 2010 Reid became the spokesperson for Frito Lay Canada's Doritos Viralocity Contest. The nationwide competition asked Canadians to name the company's newest flavour of the tortilla-based chip product and create a 60-second online video. Billy was interviewed on many news and Canadian morning talk shows, including Webnation hosted by Amber MacArthur.

Billy's work has appeared on MTV, The Comedy Network, VH1's Best Week Ever, Sketch with Kevin McDonald, CBC On Demand, Gemini Awards and The Science Channel.

== Videogames ==
=== Ninja Gaiden 4 ===
Billy made his videogame voice-acting debut as the main antagonist "Achilles" as well as his human form "Misaki", for the videogame Ninja Gaiden 4 released for PlayStation 5, Windows, and Xbox Series X/S on October 21, 2025.

== Children's Entertainment ==
=== Pancake Manor ===
Reid created the children's music and educational YouTube series with Reb Stevenson. The first music video aired on YouTube on July 23, 2011, and as of Oct 2025, the show is in its fourteenth season. The YouTube channel has over 3.3 billion video views and over 3.2 million subscribers. In 2013 Stevenson revealed in a television interview that the puppets were actually designed by Reid a few years before he knew they would be used for a children's show.

In 2012, YouTube selected Pancake Manor, along with 100 other creators to produce original Olympics-themed clips for its Live in London promotion.

In 2013, YouTube again invited Pancake Manor to create a video celebrating geek culture. Their video was about the eight planets of the Solar System.

In 2020, Pancake Manor signed with children's entertainment company Moonbug Entertainment. Pancake Manor has since been featured alongside other Moonbug brands including CocoMelon and Blippi.

In 2024, Pancake Manor created a fully animated seven minute episode with Smiley Guy Studios in Toronto Canada, produced in participation with the Canadian Media Fund. The episode features new characters such as "Grandmama" and "Pop-Pop" as well a baby seagull named "Marshmallow".

The show has featured many Internet personalities, including Rhett and Link and iJustine

== Music ==
=== Very Tasteful ===
June 7, 2009, Billy Reid (under his pseudonym "Very Tasteful") independently released Very Tasteful : Vol 1, an online comedy album the featuring the popular song Lip Syncing to The Song.

=== Self-Titled ===
June 15, 2009, Billy Reid independently released "The Sights & The Sounds", a collection of his pop songs featuring the title track The Sights & The Sounds.

=== Rhett and Link ===
Jan 10, 2010 "Rhett & Link – Up to this Point" is released featuring the Billy Reid co-produced song Hello – The Seti Song. The album is available on iTunes Store, Amazon, Spotify, and most online music stores.

=== Pancake Manor ===
"Pancake Manor",(Sept 11, 2012) is his first children's music album. It features the popular songs Shapes and Let's Count 123.

"Two", (Jan 30, 2014) The album features the popular songs Count to 10 and Pancake Party.

"Colors!", (Nov 19, 2014) The first themed children's album for "Pancake Manor," It features the popular song Pink, co-written and sung by Reb Stevenson.

"Happy and We Know It", (Jan 12, 2017) is the fourth "Pancake Manor" album, featuring the popular songs Old Macdonald Had a Farm and Five Little Monkeys Jumping on the Bed.

"Shake It Up" (June 1, 2019) is the fifth "Pancake Manor" album.

"Scrambled Eggs For All " (Sep 25, 2020) is the sixth "Pancake Manor" album, and the first to be released under label Moonbug Entertainment. This is the firest album to not feature puppets Zach or Reggie, but rather Billy as a king, and Pancake Manor co-creator Reb Stevenson as a queen, and Humpty Dumpty.

"Pancake Manor Español, Vol. 1" (March 26, 2021) is their first Spanish album, featuring many translated nursery rhymes.

"Kids Storytime with Pancake Manor" (Feb 26, 2021) is an 4-track "Pancake Manor" EP featuring stories as well as songs.

"Just a Minute!" (Jan 14,2022) is the first themed album since "Colors" in 2014. Each of the tracks is around one minute. The longest track is one minute and seven seconds(Duck) while the shortest is only fifty-two seconds. (Smile)

"Boo! It's Halloween" (Oct 7, 2022) is an eight track Halloween album featuring a cover of Monster Mash.

"Halloween Fun" (Sept 1,2023) is an EP that features three original Halloween songs.

"Halloween Dance Party" (Oct 4, 2024) Featuring eight original Halloween songs.

"Christmas with Pancake Manor " (Nov 1, 2024) A Christmas-themed album featuring mostly original music.
