= Home Page (TV series) =

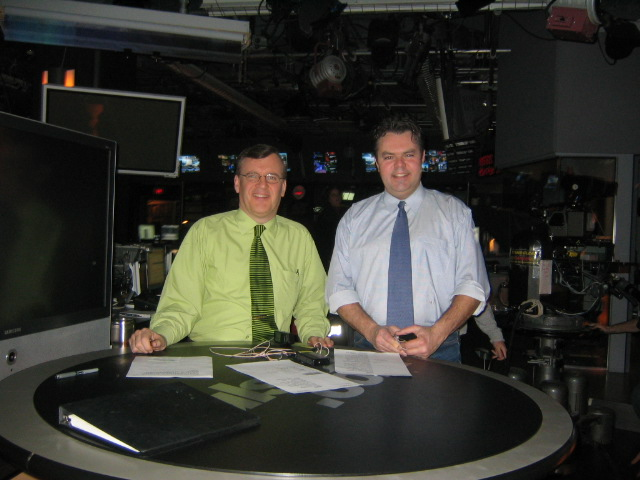
David Onley and Jim Sanderson, after a taping of Home Page on CP24, 18 January 2006.

Home Page was a technology television that aired show on CablePulse 24, hosted by David Onley and later others.

Original host David Onley left the program, after being appointed Lieutenant Governor of Ontario. He was replaced by Amber MacArthur on departure, and soon after Jee-Yun Lee took over, when MacArthur resigned. Jee-Yun Lee once again resigned from Home Page in 2009 and was replaced by Omar Sachedina. CTV announced that Home Page would end with its last broadcast on October 7, 2009, and therefore being replaced by new show, Webnation effective October 14, 2009 and hosted by former Home Page host Amber MacArthur.
