= St. Raphael (aircraft) =

Aircraft disappearance

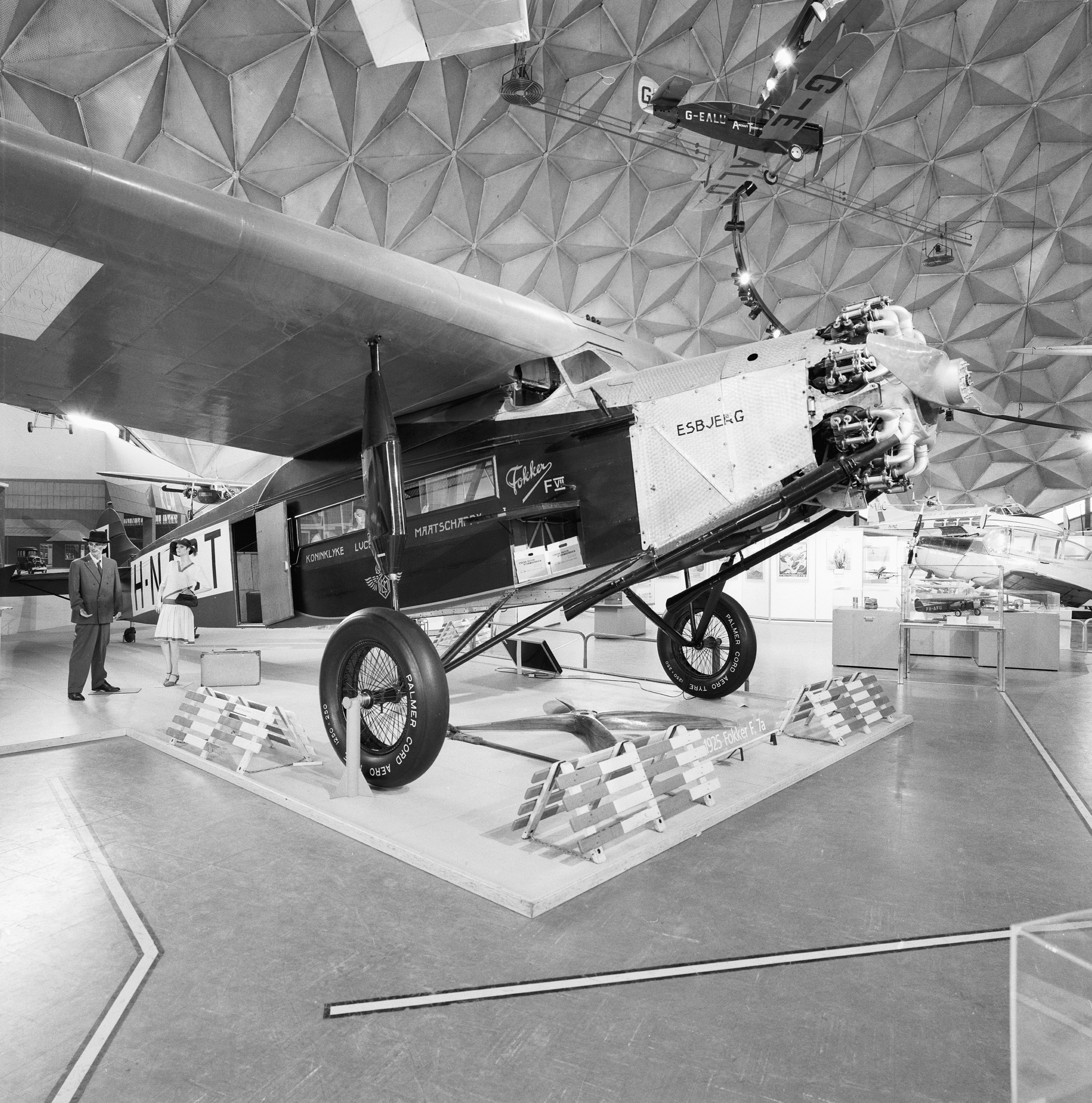
- Fokker F.VIIa similar to the St. Raphael

General information
- Type: Fokker F.VIIa
- Construction number: 5023
- Registration: G-EBTQ

History
- Fate: Lost Atlantic Ocean 1927

The St. Raphael was a Fokker F.VIIa monoplane that was used in 1927 for a transatlantic flight from England to Canada in an attempt to be the first to cross from east to west. With the owner and financial backer Princess Anne of Löwenstein-Wertheim-Freudenberg as a passenger, the aircraft departed RAF Upavon, Wiltshire, at 7:30 on 31 August 1927 with Frederick F. Minchin and Leslie Hamilton as flight crew. The St. Raphael's last confirmed sighting was west of Ireland, approximately 1,200 nautical miles (2,200 km; 1,400 mi) from Upavon at 21:44 by the steamer Josiah Macy; around 06:00 the next morning the Dutch steamer Blijdendijik reported seeing a white light travelling eastward in the sky when about 420 nautical miles (780 km; 480 mi) east-southeast of New York City, which, if it were St. Raphael, was far to the south of its intended route, suggesting that they were lost. After a number of unconfirmed reports of sightings, the aircraft and occupants were never seen again.

== See also ==
- List of missing aircraft
- Old Glory
- W33 Bremen (Crossed East to West across Atlantic in 1928)
