= Jeff MacArthur =

Canadian netcasting and tech personality

- Born: Charlottetown, Prince Edward Island
- Education: B.A. in Computer Science & Math from McGill University; B.Sc. in Computing Science from Simon Fraser University; GDBA (core of MBA) from Simon Fraser University
- Known for: commandN; MGImedia.ca
- Title: Technology Consultant & Podcast Host
- Relatives: Amber MacArthur
- Website: www.jeffmacarthur.com

Jeff MacArthur is a Canadian netcasting and tech personality. MacArthur co-created commandN.tv, a technology/social media video podcast with his sister, Amber MacArthur, and acted as co-host and business manager for the production from its inception in 2005 until its hiatus in 2013. His segments regularly featured on television through G4TechTV's series, Torrent (which, along with commandN.tv, he also wrote the music and coordinated motion graphics for). MacArthur also created and co-hosted the muzikDEN music industry video podcast which ran from 2006 to 2007.

== Background ==
MacArthur is originally from Charlottetown and currently lives in Halifax. After attending high school in Ottawa, he received an undergraduate degree in Computer Science & Math from McGill University in Montreal, a graduate degree in Computing Science from Simon Fraser University (with thesis on the visualization of music), and a GDBA (core of MBA) from Simon Fraser University in Vancouver.

MacArthur was leader of the urban funk band Solcola, which performed at both the Atlantic and Vancouver International Jazz Festivals.

His sister is Amber MacArthur.

== Career ==
Jeff co-founded MGImedia Communications Inc. with Amber MacArthur, a technology and communications consulting firm specializing in social media, usability, and video production. Jeff's blog, JeffMacArthur.com, features movie, music, and book reviews, as well as information for Macintosh users and his iRant commentaries. In 2009, Jeff started the decabled.com blog to "cut the cable cord" and use the internet for video content.

Jeff has been Director of Communications for TEDxHalifax, as well as Halifax's Nocturne: Art at Night event, and has sat on the boards of Nova Scotia's technology industry association, Digital Nova Scotia, and music industry association, Music Nova Scotia. Jeff is a regular speaker on social media and usability/user experience, including at events such as Blogworld, MESH, Podcamp Toronto, and the Atlantic Internet Marketing Conference, and organizes Halifax's Third Wednesday tech/media/marketing meetup.

MacArthur worked for world-renowned technology entertainment firms such as Electronic Arts and Mainframe Entertainment (creators of ReBoot) in Vancouver. Upon relocating to Halifax, Jeff produced a quarterly video documentary on tsunami reconstruction activities in Ampara District, the part of Sri Lanka most affected by the December 2004 tsunami. Jeff has worked onsite in Canada, United States, Russia, Serbia, and Sri Lanka, and has done project work in various other countries (including Japan, Paraguay, Kenya, etc.). He is currently President of MGImedia Communications Inc., specializing in social media and usability.
