= Aerospace Heritage Foundation of Canada =

Canadian non-profit organization

The logo of the organization

The Aerospace Heritage Foundation of Canada is a federally chartered and non-profit organization based in Etobicoke, Toronto, Ontario, that is dedicated to preserving and promoting the achievements of the Canadian aerospace industry.

According to Canada Revenue Agency filings, their last active year was 2019.

== History ==
In March 1988 a group of ex-Avro Canada employees and other aviation enthusiasts held a 30th Anniversary Dinner and Reunion to celebrate the First Flight of the Avro Arrow. The then Science Specialist with Citytv Toronto David C. Onley, the current Honourable Lieutenant-Governor of Ontario, proposed that a full-scale replica model of the Avro Arrow be constructed. This would provide Canadians with a physical legacy for future generations to see and appreciate and to understand the technological base that became Canada's Aerospace Industry today.

As a result of this suggestion a committee was formed with Mr. David Onley as President along with James C. Floyd, former Vice President Engineering Avro Canada, Mario Pesando, Syd Britton, Nicholas Doran, Jim Mitchell, Eddy Metz, Bill Turner and Ray Gibson. Their discussions led to the formation in the summer of 1988 of the Canadian Aerospace Heritage Foundation.

In the spring of 1989 the name was changed to the Aerospace Heritage Foundation of Canada and the first Annual Report was presented in December 1989.

== Administration ==
The A.H.F.C. is made up of a Board of Directors (consisting of a President and various Directors), General Membership, and various other volunteers. The Board of Directors meets approximately 9 times per year along with an Annual General Membership Meeting.

The A.H.F.C. also has had various Patrons over the years. In March 1990, James (Jim) C. Floyd was named Patron of the A.H.F.C. He resigned at the end of May 1997 and was succeeded by Colonel (hon) William (Bill) Coyle, O StJ, O.Ont. Bill Coyle was employed by Avro Aircraft Ltd. Malton Ontario in the Experimental Flight Test Engineering Group and is Honorary Colonel Canadian Forces School of Aerospace Technology and Engineering.

== Social contributions ==
A major focus of the A.H.F.C over the years has been the organizing of Dinners and Reunions to commemorate Avro and Orenda's achievements including such things as the founding of Orenda, the first flight of the Avro Jetliner, Avro CF-100 and the Avro Arrow.

Another area of contributions has been in awards and bursaries. March 1990 saw the establishment of the "James C. Floyd Award for Outstanding Contribution to Canadian Aerospace" with Test Pilot Janusz Zurakowski as the first recipient. The issuing of the award was passed on to the Aerospace Industries Association of Canada in 2010 with it being awarded for the first time through them in October 2010.

The A.H.F.C. supports the 845 Avro Arrow Squadron of the Royal Canadian Air Cadets by sponsoring two annual awards, "The James C. Floyd Trophy" for Outstanding Engineering Excellence and the "Janusz Zurakowski Trophy" for Gliding Excellence. A bursary is also presented to the recipients for each of these awards .

The A.H.F.C. also conducts various educational efforts including displays at various venues and lectures to interested groups. They loan out selected artifacts from their collection to museums. Some of these items can be seen at places like the Ontario Science Centre and the Canadian Air and Space Museum.

== Projects ==
In 1995 for the 50th Anniversary of the Avro Canada CF100 the A.H.F.C. raised monies for the refurbishment of a CF100 mounted on a pedestal at Derry Road next to the Orenda Plant in Malton Ontario.

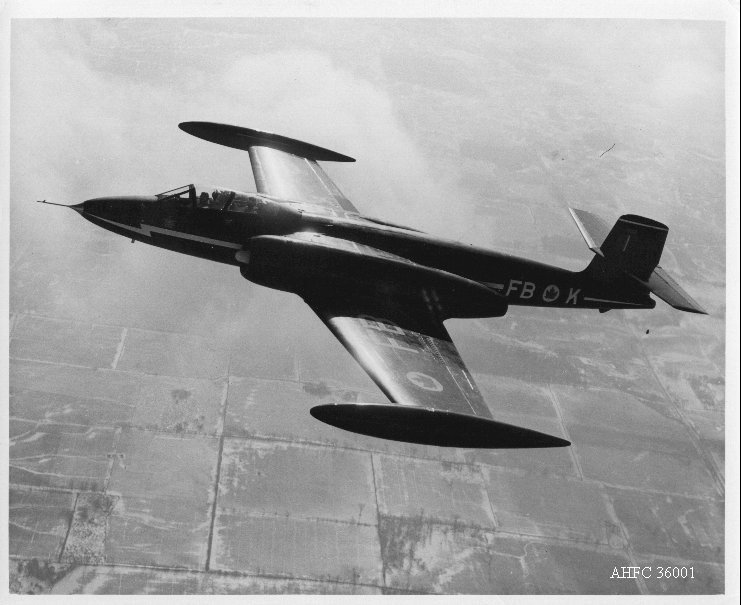
CF-100 Prototype 18102

Over the years since its formation the A.H.F.C. has also conducted an underwater search in Lake Ontario in an attempt to recover one or more of the Avro Arrow Aerodynamic Test Models fired aboard a Nike (rocket) over the lake. Much interest in this project has been expressed with programs such as the History Channel, Discovery Channel, and the National Geographic Channel. The Sea Hunters have also produced a program on the A.H.F.C. involvement in the ongoing search for the models. In 2004 the Canadian Navy along with A.H.F.C. members, using two Navy vessels as a training exercise, conducted searches of areas previously identified in 2003. Search efforts have continued in a limited capacity in the years since through other organizations.

A memorial is currently in progress in tribute of the memory of Flight-Lieutenant Bruce Warren of Toronto and Avro Engineer Bob Ostrander of Brampton both of whom died in the crash of the second prototype Avro CF-100 #18102. It crashed on Thursday April 5, 1951, at 10:50am near Komoka Ontario.
