= National Army Museum =

Museum in London, England

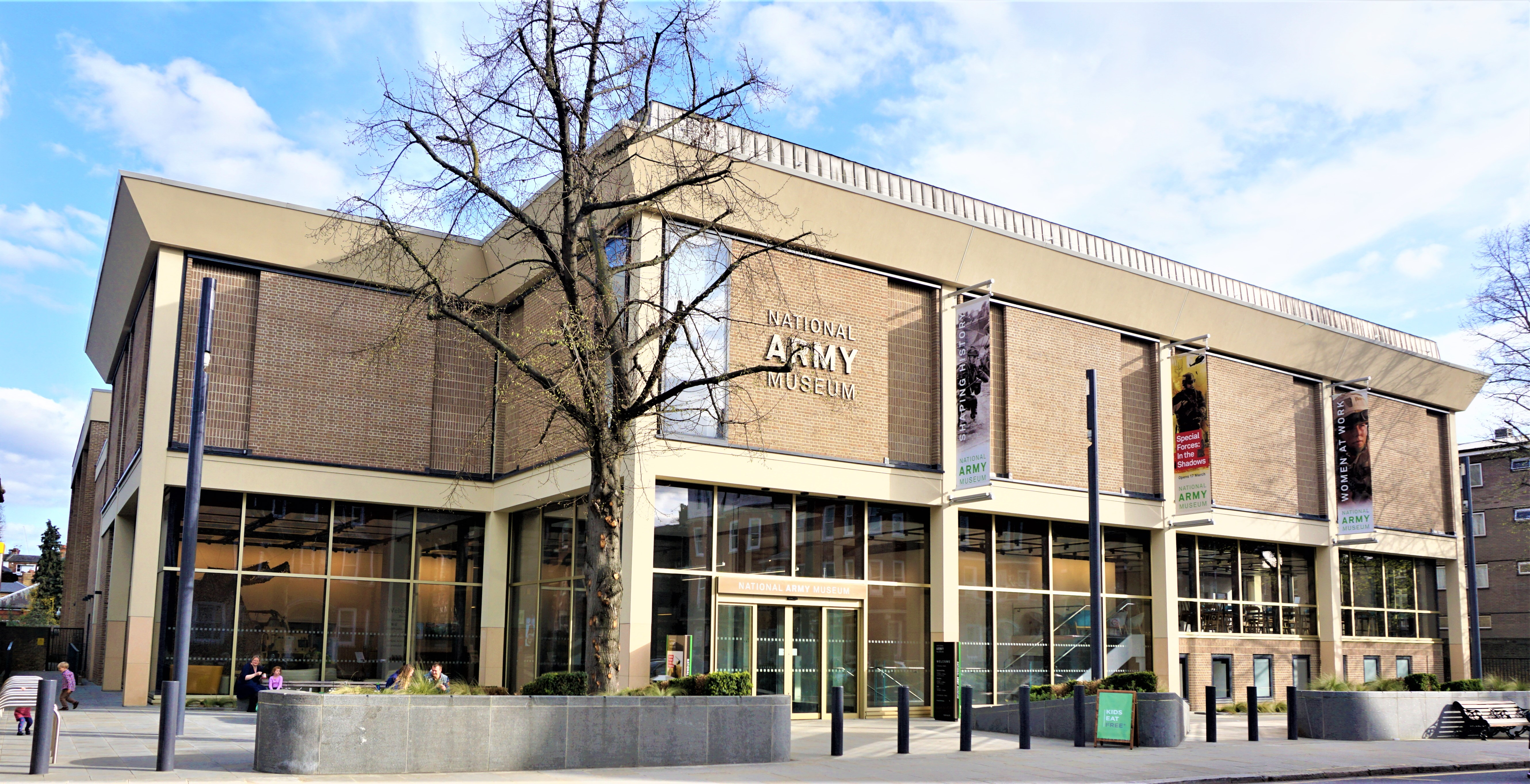
- The main entrance of the National Army Museum from Royal Hospital Road

- Location within Greater London
- Established: 1960 (collection); 1971 (building)
- Location: Royal Hospital Road; London, SW3; United Kingdom
- Coordinates: 51.486111°N 0.16°W
- Visitors: 215,721 (2008, up 7.3%)
- Director: Justin Maciejewski
- Public transit access: Sloane Square
- Website: nam.ac.uk

The National Army Museum is the national home of the history and heritage of the British Army. Through permanent galleries, special exhibitions, collections and programmes, the museum explores how soldiers have shaped our world and lives, from the British Civil Wars to the Army's role today. It was established by Royal Charter in 1960, and is a non-departmental public body sponsored by the Ministry of Defence.

The museum's role is to collect, preserve and exhibit items related to the British Army and Commonwealth Forces. Its remit contrasts with that of other military museums in the United Kingdom which concentrate on the history of individual corps and regiments of the Army. It also covers the pre-independence history of the East India Company Army, the British Indian Army and other colonial units as well as housing the regimental or corps collections of the East Kent Regiment, the Middlesex Regiment the Women's Royal Army Corps, and the Irish regiments disbanded in 1922, part of the collection of the former Museum of Army Transport, and the archives of the Coldstream Guards and Grenadier Guards.

The museum is located in Chelsea, London. It is open to the public from Tuesdays to Sundays, 10.00am to 5.30pm, except on Christmas, Boxing Day and New Year's Day. Admission is free.

== History ==
=== 1960–2014 ===
The National Army Museum was first conceived in the late 1950s, and owes its existence to the persistent hard work of Field Marshal Sir Gerald Templer, who did most of the fundraising for it. It was established by Royal Charter in 1960, with the intention of collecting, preserving, and exhibiting objects and records relating to the Regular and Auxiliary forces of the British Army and of the Commonwealth, and to encourage research into their history and traditions. It was initially established in 1960 in temporary accommodation at the former No.1 Riding School at the Royal Military Academy Sandhurst.

A new purpose-built building, designed in brutalist style by William Holford & Partners, was started in 1961 on a site which had previously formed part of the old infirmary of the Royal Hospital Chelsea. The new building was completed ten years later and opened by Queen Elizabeth II on 11 November 1971.

One director, Ian Robertson, initiated a programme to establish an outpost of the Museum in the garrison town of Catterick, North Yorkshire, to be known as National Army Museum North, on the model of Imperial War Museum's establishment of the Imperial War Museum North in Manchester. A large site was chosen near Marne Barracks, beside the A1, and in 2002 Simon Pierce of Austin-Smith:Lord was chosen as the new museum's architect. However, funding and planning issues later led to the cancellation of the plan in 2003. The National Army Museum instead underwent a major redevelopment of its gallery and corridor displays at Chelsea from 2006 onwards, establishing new displays in existing permanent display areas, converting the corridors from oil-painting displays to permanent-exhibition spaces, and producing new temporary and permanent display areas on the third floor. This redisplay concluded with the opening of the new permanent National Service gallery in October 2010, though a further phase of redevelopment followed from 2011 onwards.

=== 2014–present ===
From 1 May 2014 until 30 March 2017, the museum was closed to the public for a major rebuilding programme. These refurbishment cost £23.75 million, of which £11.5 million was financed by the Heritage Lottery Fund: the works created five galleries that cover British military history from the English Civil War up to modern day. The rebuilding was overseen by BDP architects, and specialist museum design company, Event Communications.

Esther Dugdale from Event Communications noted that "The new museum aims to create a dialogue about the army – not to promote it, but bring the discussion of it into the public domain", and "The displays express its multi-layered history and relationship with the public. It does not shy away from some of the more difficult issues, but also gives a voice to the many who have served and what they have experienced". Dugdale also stated that the new design would be an "immersive experience", allowing visitors to ride simulated tanks, load rifles and understand war tactics in a technology-driven 3D environment.

In early March 2017, Queen Elizabeth II reopened the Museum, marking the completion of a three-year renovation. Whilst much public response to the revamp was positive, in an article in The Spectator, historian and Museum trustee Andrew Roberts severely criticised the new displays, stating: "Instead of seeing artefacts in a historical context, as part of a chronological narrative, the visitor is forced to explore themes, and as ever this has provided an opening for guilt, apology and political correctness"; he also pointed to incorrect statements, and suggested a generalised dumbing-down, writing of medal displays: "we are not told in very many cases what they are or even who they were awarded to." In 2022, in a follow-up article, Roberts announced that under new director Brigadier Justin Maciejewski, the museum had "returned to the aims of its Royal Charter, anchored itself to historical facts rather than contemporary politicised fashions," and telling the Army's story from "an evidence-based, objective perspective." Maciejewski has explicitly rolled back on decolonisation and other attempts in the 2017 redisplay to deal with controversial aspects of the army's history, despite concerns raised earlier in his tenure about a focus on improving gender diversity in the Museum's staff whilst the real issue lay in other kinds of diversity, and about his January 2021 staff restructure, with concerns that it showed a "lack of consideration of professionalism and understanding of the core role of the museum as a public institution ensuring the preservation of history and exhibitions".

== Galleries ==
The 2017 redisplay had a temporary display space (later split into a smaller and a larger space, the latter housing 'Foe to Friend', a 2020 exhibition on the BAOR now running until 2024) and five new permanent galleries: Soldier, Army, Battle and Society. By April 2023 Empire and Army had been replaced by Formation and Global respectively, with Battle replaced by Conflict in Europe on 7 April 2023 and Society due to be replaced by Army At Home in September 2023.

== Governance ==
The National Army Museum achieved devolved status as a non-departmental public body in 1983 under terms of the National Heritage Act. The annual Grant-in-Aid from the Ministry of Defence, is administered by the Director of the Museum on behalf of the governing body, the board of trustees of the National Army Museum.

=== Directors ===
- Lieutenant-Colonel Charles Bernard Appleby 1971–1975
- John Paris 1975–1982
- William Reid 1982–1988
- Ian Robertson 1988–2003†
- Alan Guy 2003–2010
- Janice Murray 2010–2017
- Justin Maciejewski 2018–

† = Died in post

== Sources ==
- Chandler, D. G. "The National Army Museum." History Today. (Sep 1972), Vol. 22 Issue 9, pp. 664–668; online
- National Army Museum Account 2009–2010 ("The Account") (PDF).
