= Air Force Cross (United Kingdom) =

Military gallantry award

- Obverse of medal
- Type: Military decoration
- Awarded for: "... gallantry while flying but not on active operations against the enemy."
- Description: Silver cross
- Presented by: United Kingdom and Commonwealth
- Eligibility: British, Commonwealth (formerly) and allied forces
- Status: Currently awarded
- Established: 3 June 1918
- Final award: 2024 Special Honours

Highlights
- Total: Including further award bars: George V: 804; George VI: 3,053; Elizabeth II (to 2017): 1,696; Total: 5,553
- Ribbon: diagonal alternate white and red stripes

Order of Wear
- Next (higher): Distinguished Flying Cross
- Next (lower): Royal Red Cross, Second Class
- Related: Air Force Medal

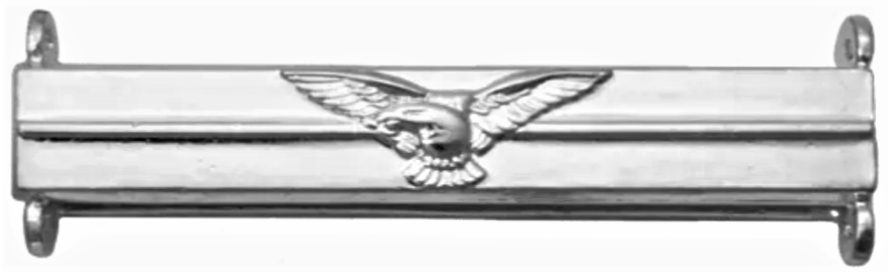
Ribbon bar for 2nd award

The Air Force Cross (AFC) is a military decoration awarded to officers, and since 1993 other ranks, of the British Armed Forces, and formerly also to officers of the other Commonwealth countries. It is granted for "an act or acts of exemplary gallantry while flying, though not in active operations against the enemy". A bar is added to the ribbon for holders who are awarded a further AFC.

== History ==
The award was established on 3 June 1918, shortly after the formation of the Royal Air Force (RAF). It was originally awarded to RAF commissioned officers and Warrant Officers, but was later expanded to include Royal Navy and army aviation officers.

While consistently awarded for service while "flying though not in active operations against the enemy", the AFC was originally awarded for "valour, courage or devotion to duty whilst flying" with many awards made for meritorious service over a period of time, rather than a specific act of bravery. These awards were discontinued in 1993, when the criteria were narrowed to "exemplary gallantry while flying".

A bar is added to the ribbon of holders of the AFC for each further award, with a silver rosette worn on the ribbon when worn alone to denote the award of each bar.

Recipients of the Air Force Cross are entitled to use the post-nominal letters "AFC".

Between 1919 and 1932 the AFC was also awarded to civilians, on the same basis as for RAF personnel. In March 1941 eligibility was extended to Naval officers of the Fleet Air Arm, and in November 1942 to Army officers, with posthumous awards permitted from 1979.

Since the 1993 review of the honours system as part of the drive to remove distinctions of rank in bravery awards, all ranks of all arms of the Armed Forces have been eligible, and the Air Force Medal, which had until then been awarded to other ranks, was discontinued.

The AFC had also been awarded by Commonwealth countries but by the 1990s most, including Canada, Australia and New Zealand, had established their own honours systems and no longer recommended British honours.

== Description ==
- The medal is a silver cross, 60 millimetres (2.4 in) in height and 54 millimetres (2.1 in) wide, representing aircraft propeller blades, with wings between the arms. It was design by Edward Carter Preston.
- The obverse depicts Hermes, riding on the wings of a hawk holding a laurel wreath. At the top of the upper arm is the royal crown, while the other three arms bear the royal cypher of the reigning monarch at the time of issue.
- The reverse is plain, except for a central roundel bearing the reigning monarch's cypher and the date '1918'. Originally awarded unnamed, from 1939 the year of issue was engraved on the reverse lower limb of cross, and since 1984 it has been awarded named to the recipient.
- The suspender is straight and decorated with laurel wreaths.
- The ribbon bar denoting a further award is silver, with the Royal Air Force eagle in its centre. Bars awarded during World War II have the year of award engraved on the reverse.
- The 32 mm (1.25 inch) ribbon was originally white with red broad horizontal stripes, but changed in July 1919 to the current white with red broad diagonal stripes at a 45-degree angle.

Air Force Cross ribbon bars
	AFC	AFC and Bar
1918–1919		
Since 1919		

== Recipients ==
=== Numbers awarded ===
From 1918 to 2017 approximately 5,360 Air Force Crosses and 193 bars have been awarded. The figures to 1979 are laid out in the table below, the dates reflecting the relevant entries in the London Gazette:

Period		Crosses	1st bar	2nd bar
World War I	1918–19	679	2	–
Inter–War	1920–39	159	10	3
World War II	1940–45	2,001	26	1
Post–War	1946–79	2,242	135	8
Total	1918–79	5,081	173	12

In addition, between 1980 and 2017 approximately 279 AFCs and eight second-award bars have been awarded.

The above figures include awards to the Dominions:

In all, 560 AFCs have gone to Canadians, including those serving in the RAF, including 70 for World War I, 462 and one bar for World War II and 28 post–war awards.

A total of 444 AFCs and two bars have been awarded to Australians, the last award made in 1983.

A number of awards were made to New Zealanders until the AFC was replaced by the New Zealand Gallantry Decoration in 1999.

A total of 87 honorary awards have been made to members of allied foreign forces, including 26 for World War I, 58 for World War II and three post-war, the latter all to members of the US Air Force.

=== Notable awards ===
- George Bulman (1896–1963); awarded the AFC three times for services as a test pilot.
- Geoffrey Dhenin (1918–2008); awarded the AFC twice for his role in the British nuclear weapons tests in Australia (1954 and 1959).
- Marshal of the Royal Air Force Andrew Humphrey (1921–1977); awarded the AFC three times,
- Willie Read (1885–1972); awarded the AFC three times.
- H. P. Ruffell Smith (1911–1980); awarded the AFC three times.
- Peter Thorne (1923–2014); awarded the AFC three times (1947, 1951 and 1956).

== See also ==
- British and Commonwealth orders and decorations
