= William Reade =

William Reade may refer to:

- William Reade (bishop) (c. 1315–1385), medieval bishop of Chichester
- William Morris Reade (1787–1847), Irish Conservative politician and Member of Parliament
- William Winwood Reade (1838–1875), English historian, explorer, novelist, and philosopher
- William Reade (MP for Northumberland), Member of Parliament for Northumberland (UK Parliament constituency) in 1593

== See also ==
- William Rede (disambiguation)
- William Read (disambiguation)
- William Reid (disambiguation)
- William Reed (disambiguation)
