= RAF Eastbourne =

RAF Eastbourne (formerly Royal Naval Air Station Eastbourne) was a Royal Air Force airfield near Eastbourne.

== Fowler Flying School ==
The Fowler Flying School (also later known as the Eastbourne Flying School) was established by Major Bernard Fowler in 1909 at Beaulieu, Hampshire but moved to the 50-acre site between Eastbourne and Pevensey Bay. His original airfield lies under the present day industrial estate below St Anthony's Mount. In nearby Leeds Avenue an original Royal Naval Air Service (RNAS) guardhouse is the sole surviving building from this enterprise and is now converted to a bungalow.

== Eastbourne Aviation Company ==
The Eastbourne Aviation Company was an aircraft factory that was constructed in early 1913 on the Crumbles shingle beach where the Sovereign Centre swimming pool now stands. Despite its proximity to the Royal Naval Flying School which was adjacent to the factory, it did not produce seaplanes, instead producing the Royal Aircraft Factory B.E.2c and Avro 504. The factory performed some repair work for the Royal Naval Air Service. During World War I, the factory prospered off wartime orders, declining after the war. This led to the eventual closure of the factory and Aviation Company in 1924.

In 1917, the factory fielded a ladies' football team from the seaplane sheds, players including Hilda Goudhurst, Mabal [sic] Goudhurst, Mabal [sic] Marchant, Rose Holobone, Marjorie Putland, Lilian Lee, Bessy Brown.

== Royal Naval Air Service ==
The Admiralty had taken an interest in 1913 having leased part of the airfield and helped fund development of various facilities. With the outbreak of war, the site was taken over by the Royal Naval Air Service and subsequently expanded by acquiring neighbouring land. The site served as the Naval Flying School between August 1914 and November 1916, and later between May 1917 and April 1918 to undertake initial flying training.

Aircraft based at the school were initially of a variety of types, however, this was not seen as the ideal training environment and eventually, aircraft was rationalised where the airframes by Maurice Farman and the Curtiss Jenny could be found at the school.

During the First World War aspiring pilots from all over the Commonwealth came to train here. A young trainee Dan Minchin learned to fly a Bristol Boxkite at this aerodrome and in 1927 attempted to cross the Atlantic in a Fokker V11A monoplane named St Raphael. Lieut Colonel Minchin and two colleagues were lost when the aircraft failed to reach Ottawa, Canada. A plaque on the wall below the 'RAF' window of Eastbourne College in Blackwater Road commemorates the loss of this 'Old Eastbournian'.

== Royal Air Force ==
Following the amalgamation of the RNAS and Royal Flying Corps in 1918 to form the Royal Air Force, the Naval Flying School initially became No. 206 Training Depot Station. No. 54 Training Squadron was transferred to the site from Castle Bromwich and the two units combined to form No. 50 Training Depot Station. The combined units were refocused into training day bomber pilots in a fleet that included the Avro 504, Bristol F.2B, Airco DH.6, Airco DH.9 and Sopwith Camel.

Trainee numbers at the site decreased in the latter months of the war, and 50 TDS was moved to RAF Manston by autumn 1919. The airfield reverted to its previous owners, however, lack of business ultimately led to its closure in 1920 reverting to agriculture.
