= William Rede =

William Rede may refer to:

- William Reade (bishop) or Rede, medieval bishop of Chichester
- William Rede (by 1529–at least 1569), MP for Devizes
- William Rede (died 1558), MP for Cricklade, and for Gloucestershire
- William Leman Rede (1802–1847), playwright

== See also ==
- William Reade (disambiguation)
- William Read (disambiguation)
- William Reid (disambiguation)
- William Reed (disambiguation)
