= William Reed (publisher) =

British publisher

William Reed (1830-1920) was the youngest son of a Yorkshire farmer who founded the publishing company that bears his name in 1862

== Life ==
Being the son of a farmer, William Reed worked as a sugar merchant in the early years of his career, which was later to be the inspiration behind his first journal, The Grocer. Marrying in to the Morgan Family, founders of the Morgan Brothers publishers, Reed was told to find a more suitable job. The brothers, primarily bankers, but with other business pursuits, entered publishing in 1859, publishing The Ironmonger and Chemist & Druggist. With the growth of the trade magazine market occurring at the time, Reed was inspired to found his own publishers. With his experience in the farming trade, Reed founded The Grocer in 1862 which is the leading market title today after 150 years.
