= Webnation =

- Genre: Web and Technology
- Starring: Amber MacArthur
- Country of origin: Canada
- Original language: English

Production
- Production location: Toronto

Original release
- Network: CablePulse 24
- Release: October 14, 2009 – present

Webnation logo

Webnation is a television show about technology that is aired on CP24 in Toronto, Canada. It features technology news, viral videos, reviews and trends. The program first aired on October 14, 2009, and replaces the talk television show HomePage. The show is hosted weekly by New Media Specialist Amber MacArthur and CP24 Web Journalist Maurice Cacho.

== History ==
In January 2007, CHUM Limited (CP24's former parent company) announced that it would launch a weekly program on CP24, which became popular as a vodcast. Originally titled Inside Popnology, the CHUM Television-produced program was renamed Webnation. MacArthur resigned in October to go for freelance projects, feeling she was being asked to target too old an audience, and wanted to pursue two projects in the United States. The station convinced her to stick around for two more months, after Rogers Communications promised her show would be weekly on the Citytv network and on G4techTV Canada, reformatted, as of January 2008 as Webnation V2. (CTV's parent company, CTVglobemedia, bought CHUM Limited in June 2007, with the exception of the Citytv network, which was sold to Rogers Media).

CP24 was informed on January 4, 2008, that the show would be cancelled for the budgetary reasons. Just before the announcement, the program was named the "Top New Podcast Award for 2007" by iTunes. CTVglobemedia announced the return of Webnation on the CP24 schedule effective October 14, 2009.
