= William Reid (Scottish cricketer) =

Scottish cricketer

Personal information
- Full name: William Hamilton Reid
- Born: 25 July 1893; Uddingston, Lanarkshire, Scotland
- Died: 17 January 1949 (aged 55); Glasgow, Lanarkshire, Scotland
- Batting: Right-handed
- Bowling: Right-arm off break

Domestic team information
- Years: Team
- 1923: Scotland

Career statistics
Competition	First-class
Matches	1
Runs scored	0
Batting average	0.00
100s/50s	–/–
Top score	0*
Balls bowled	171
Wickets	4
Bowling average	13.00
5 wickets in innings	–
10 wickets in match	–
Best bowling	4/29
Catches/stumpings	–/–
- Source: Cricinfo, 16 July 2022

William Hamilton Reid (25 July 1893 — 17 January 1949) was a Scottish first-class cricketer.

Reid was born at Uddingston in July 1893, where he was educated at Uddingston Grammar School. He in the First World War with the Scottish Rifles, being commissioned as a second lieutenant in April 1917. A club cricketer for Uddingston Cricket Club, Reid was selected to play for Scotland in a first-class cricket match against Ireland at Dublin in 1923. Playing as an off break bowler in the Scottish side, he took figures of 4 for 29 in the Irish first innings, but went wicketless as they followed-on in their second innings. From the tail he was dismissed without scoring in the Scottish first innings by William Pollock, and was unbeaten on 0 in their second innings. Outside of cricket, Reid was a coal agent and shipper. He died in the Pollokshields area of Glasgow in January 1949.
