= Frederick F. Minchin =

Royal Air Force officer (1890–1927)

Frederick Frank Reilly Minchin
- Born: 16 June 1890; Madras, India
- Military career
- Allegiance: United Kingdom
- Branch: Princess Patricia's Canadian Light Infantry, Royal Flying Corps, Royal Air Force
- Rank: Lieutenant-Colonel
- Awards: Commander of the Order of the British Empire; Distinguished Service Order; Military Cross
- Other work: Commercial pilot
- Disappeared: 31 August 1927 (aged 37)

Lieutenant-Colonel Frederick Frank Reilly Minchin CBE DSO MC (16 June 1890 – disappeared 31 August 1927) was a British pilot of the Royal Air Force. He was declared dead in absentia after his aircraft disappeared in 1927 while attempting to cross the Atlantic.

== Biography ==
Minchin was educated at Eastbourne College. He passed out of Sandhurst in 1909 and after two years resigned his commission to train as a civilian pilot at the recently formed Eastbourne Aviation Company. In 1913 he obtained his Royal Aero Club certificate flying a Bristol Boxkite at the Langney Aerodrome Eastbourne. In 1915 he transferred to the Royal Flying Corps (RFC) with the rank of lieutenant and in 1916 was awarded the Military Cross for his daring night bombing flights into enemy territory over Egypt and Palestine. He received the Distinguished Service Order in 1918 for his outstanding leadership in directing raids against Bulgarian and Austro-Hungarian armies.

In 1918, the RFC and the Royal Naval Air Service (RNAS) were merged into the Royal Air Force. In July 1919 he served in India and was appointed a Commander of the Order of the British Empire (CBE) having gained three awards for gallantry and mentioned in dispatches on three occasions.

In 1923, Minchin joined one of the first British commercial airlines, Instone Air Line, operating from Croydon Aerodrome near London.

== Disappearance ==
On 31 August 1927, Lieutenant-Colonel Minchin, Captain Leslie Hamilton and Princess Anne of Löwenstein-Wertheim-Freudenberg took off from Upavon airfield in a Dutch Fokker F.VIIA named the St. Raphael in a bid to become the first aviators to cross the Atlantic from east to west.

The St. Raphael was last sighted some 800 miles (1,300 km) west of Galway heading for Newfoundland. The St Raphael was never seen again, and the fate of Lieutenant Colonel Minchin, Captain Leslie Hamilton and Princess Loewenstein-Wertheim remains a mystery.

== See also ==
- List of missing aircraft
- List of people who disappeared mysteriously at sea
