= William Reed Ltd =

British publishing and media company

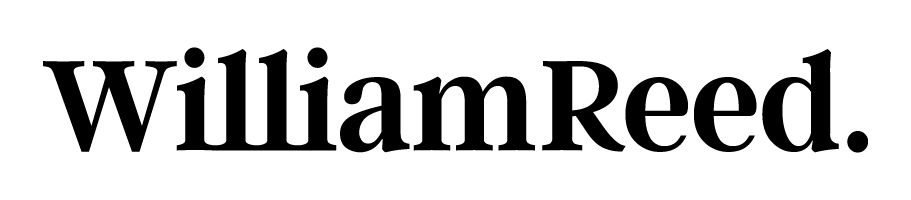
- Founded: 1862
- Founder: William Reed
- Country of origin: United Kingdom
- Headquarters location: Crawley, Sussex
- Publication types: Magazines, directories
- Official website: www.william-reed.com

William Reed is a digital, high value data, and events business serving the food and drinks sector. By 2021, it had offices in five locations – Crawley, London, Montpellier, Singapore and Chicago. In 2022 following the acquisition of Rethink Events, the William Reed list of offices grew to include a location in Brighton.

== Early history ==
In 1862, William Reed founded his own publishing company, William Reed Publishing in London. With the contacts he had made working in the grocer industry and the knowledge he had gained, he launched his first journal, The Grocer, from his premises based in Bow Lane, London. The Grocer gave readers the latest news and analysis of the trade. A year later the Wine Trade Review launched as a supplement to The Grocer.

By 1864, Reed targeted the brewing industry with Brewers Journal, and its supplement, Hop & Malt Trades Review, and in 1868 he added Tobacco Trade Review to his company's magazine line up. Reed died in 1920; at that time The Grocer was his company's best-known publication, and was used by the Ministry of Food to make announcements.

After Reed's death, his publishing company continued to be operated by his son.

In 2021, the company continues to be owned by later generations of the same family, as the company William Reed Ltd based in Crawley, Sussex.

== Brands ==
- British Baker
- Convenience Store
- Food Manufacture
- Forecourt Trader
- The Grocer
- Retail Week
- The Morning Advertiser
- FoodNavigator
- 50 Best
- Lumina Intelligence
- NutraIngredients
- MCA
- CosmeticsDesign
- World’s Best Vineyards
- FeedNavigator
- OutsourcingPharma
- BioPharma-Reporter
- BeverageDaily
- The Forecourt Show
- Foodex
- National Convenience Show
- Farm Shop & Deli Show
- Food & Drink Expo
- Probiota
- World Steak Challenge
- The Publican Awards
- The Great British Pub Awards
- Restaurant
- Rethink Events
