= William Reid (military historian) =

Scottish military historian

William Reid CBE (8 November 1926 – 19 June 2014) was a Scottish military historian who became director of the National Army Museum.

== Early life ==
Reid was born in Glasgow and educated at Eastwood School. He read astronomy at Trinity College, University of Oxford, but left before graduation for military service. He began to study accountancy in Glasgow but abandoned that after a crash on his motorcycle left him in hospital. There, he returned to his childhood interest in arms and armaments and corresponded internationally with experts on the subject. Jack Scott at the Glasgow Art Gallery and Museum arranged for Reid to catalogue the armour collection of Lord Howard de Walden at Kilmarnock.

== London ==
Reid obtained employment with Accles & Pollock in Birmingham, a supplier of archery equipment, and in 1956 as a junior curator at the Tower of London. In London studied palaeography and heraldry at the University of London. He became an assistant keeper in 1965 and a fellow of the Society of Antiquaries the same year. Reid became director of the National Army Museum in 1970, a position he held for 17 years. He became CBE in 1987.

== Personal life ==
Reid was a better singer than he claimed and said he always visited Glyndebourne with a score in hand in case his baritone services were required. He developed a large collection of military field glasses.

Reid married Nina Frances Brigden in 1958. She survived Reid. They had no children.

== Selected publications ==
- The Lore of Arms: A concise history of weaponry. Facts on File, New York, 1984. ISBN 087196855X
