= List of programs broadcast by G4 (Canadian TV channel) =

Logo used by G4 Canada, 2009 - 2017.

This is a list of television programs broadcast by the defunct Canadian television channel G4.

- Angry Planet
- Anime Current (program block similar to Anime Unleashed)
- Aqua Teen Hunger Force (now airing on Adult Swim)
- Attack of the Show!
- Bang Goes the Theory
- Beer Money!
- Bomb Patrol
- Call for Help
- Campus PD
- Check It Out! with Dr. Steve Brule (now airing on Adult Swim)
- Childrens Hospital (now airing on Adult Swim)
- CNET TV
- Code Monkeys
- Delocated (now airing on Adult Swim)
- The Drinky Crow Show (now airing on Adult Swim)
- Eagleheart (now airing on Adult Swim)
- EP Daily (On Saturdays and Sundays, the show is called EP Weekly.)
- Fat Guy Stuck in Internet (now airing on Adult Swim)
- Freaks and Geeks
- Harvey Birdman, Attorney at Law (now airing on Adult Swim)
- How I Met Your Mother
- Hurl!
- The IT Crowd
- The Lab with Leo Laporte
- The Liquidator
- MAD
- Major League Gaming
- Man, Moment, Machine
- Mantracker
- Mary Shelley's Frankenhole (now airing on Adult Swim)
- Meet the Family
- Metalocalypse (now airing on Adult Swim)
- Murdoch Mysteries
- NTSF:SD:SUV:: (now airing on Adult Swim)
- The Office
- Package Deal
- Proving Ground
- Reviews on the Run
- Rude Tube
- The Screen Savers
- Seed
- Squidbillies (now airing on Adult Swim)
- Superjail! (now airing on Adult Swim)
- Survivorman
- Tactical to Practical
- Texhnolyze
- The Tech Effect
- That's Tough
- Tim and Eric Awesome Show, Great Job! (now airing on Adult Swim)
- Titan Maximum (now airing on Adult Swim)
- Tom Goes to the Mayor (now airing on Adult Swim)
- Torrent
- Unbeatable Banzuke
- Undeclared
- The Venture Bros. (now airing on Adult Swim)
- Web Soup
- Which Way To...
- X-Play
- Xavier: Renegade Angel (now airing on Adult Swim)
