= David Onley =

Canadian journalist and politician (1950–2023)

The Honourable David Onley CM OOnt
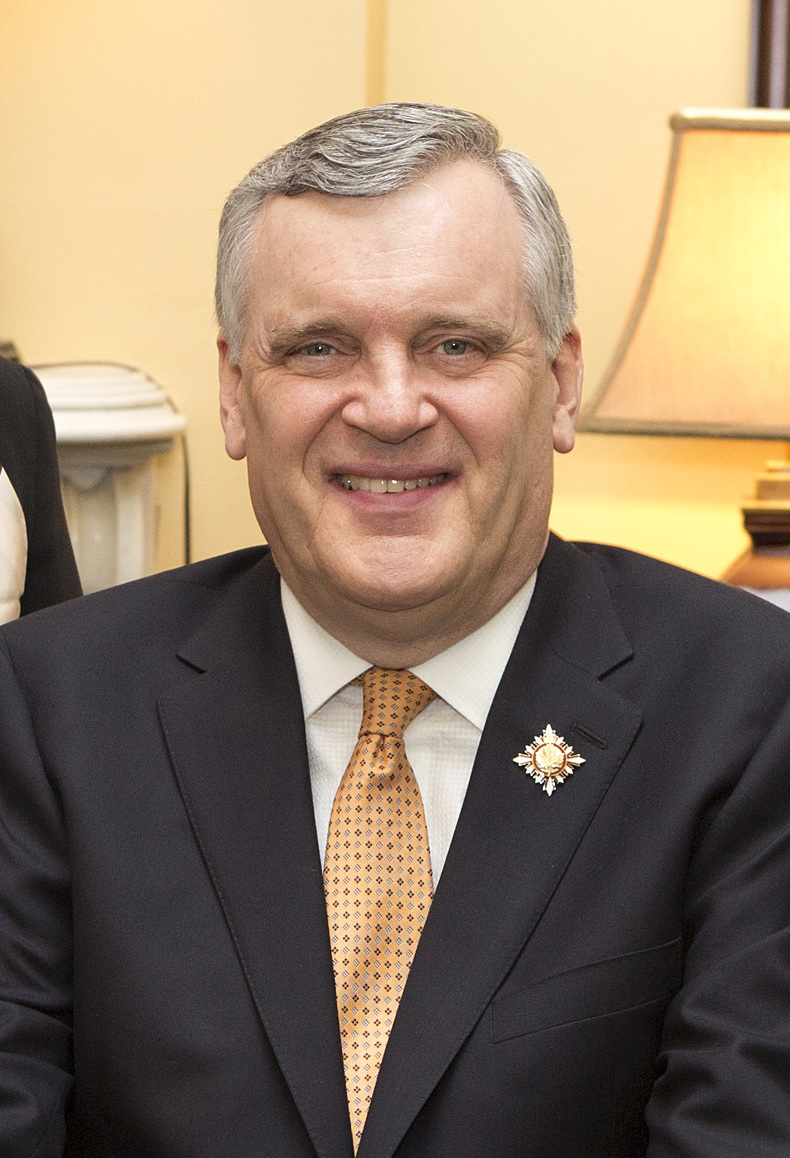
- Onley in 2013

28th Lieutenant Governor of Ontario
- In office September 5, 2007 – September 23, 2014
- Monarch: Elizabeth II
- Governors General: Michaëlle Jean; David Johnston
- Premier: Dalton McGuinty; Kathleen Wynne
- Preceded by: James Bartleman
- Succeeded by: Elizabeth Dowdeswell

Personal details
- Born: David Charles Onley; June 12, 1950 Midland, Ontario, Canada
- Died: January 14, 2023 (aged 72) Toronto, Ontario, Canada
- Spouse: Ruth Ann Onley (m. 1982)
- Children: Jonathan, Robert, Michael
- Education: University of Toronto (BA)
- Occupation: Journalist

David Charles Onley (June 12, 1950 – January 14, 2023) was a Canadian broadcaster and writer who served as the 28th lieutenant governor of Ontario from 2007 until 2014.

Prior to his viceregal appointment, Onley was a television journalist. He worked primarily for Citytv as a weather reporter, before moving on to cover science and technology stories. Later on, he worked with the 24-hour news station CablePulse 24 as a news anchor and host of a weekly technology series, Home Page. A published author, he was the founding president of the Aerospace Heritage Foundation of Canada.

His seven-year term as Lieutenant Governor of Ontario makes him the province's third longest-serving viceroy since Confederation, behind Albert Edward Matthews (1937–1946) and his successor Elizabeth Dowdeswell (2014–2023).

== Early life ==
David Charles Onley was born in Midland, Ontario, on June 12, 1950. Beginning at the age of three, he battled with polio, resulting in partial paralysis. In order to facilitate medical treatment, the family moved to Scarborough (now part of Toronto), settling on Orchard Park Drive in the neighbourhood of West Hill. As a result of extensive physical therapy, he regained the use of his hands and arms, and partial use of his legs. Onley was able to get around using leg braces, canes, crutches, and his electric scooter. He was able to drive a car using hand controls.

He was educated at the Scarborough campus of the University of Toronto, served as student council president, and graduated in 1975 with an honours Bachelor of Arts degree and specialist certificate in political science. He then attended the University of Windsor Law School from 1976 to 1977, but did not complete the degree.

== Career ==
Unable to find full-time employment after his graduation, Onley turned to writing, publishing Shuttle: A Shattering Novel of Disaster in Space, a bestselling novel about space travel, in 1981. It was nominated by the Periodical Distributors of Canada as book of the year in 1982.

While promoting the book, Onley positioned himself as a space program expert, leading to a career in radio. He began hosting a weekly science show for Toronto radio station CFRB, subsequently joining the CKO network in 1983. He then joined Citytv in 1984 as weather specialist, a position he held until 1989. In a 2004 interview with Link Up, a Toronto employment agency for people with disabilities, Onley stated that

At the time I remember saying to my mother, "I don't know if I should take this job (at Citytv). I don't know if they're hiring me because I'm disabled." My mother said, "You've been turned down enough times because of your disability, so take it!" I thought to myself, "Damn it, she's right" and that's how my career at Citytv began.

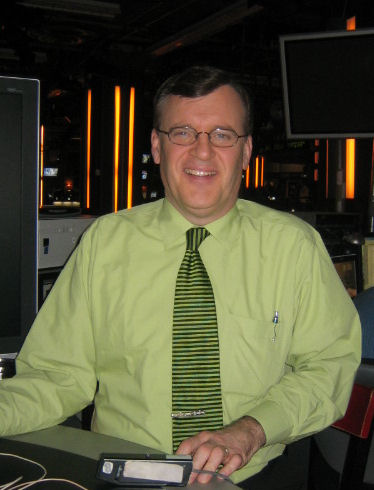
Onley on the set of Home Page, 2006

From 1989 to 1995, he was the first news anchor on the then-new Breakfast Television, Citytv's morning show. He served as education specialist for Citytv from 1994 to 1999. Onley became an anchor on Citytv's sister station CP24 upon its launch in 1998, and both hosted and produced Home Page on CP24.

He was one of Canada's first on-air television personalities with a visible disability; he used a mobility device due to his paralysis. Camera shots began with only upper body shots, but Onley demanded that the shot include him in his mobility device. In honour of his contributions to the advancement of disability issues in Canada, he has received awards from the Terry Fox Hall of Fame in 1997, and the Clarke Institute's Courage to Come Back award. He was appointed Chair of the Accessibility Standards Advisory Council to the Minister of Community and Social Services in 2005. He was inducted into the Scarborough Walk of Fame in 2006.

Onley returned to his acting roots, with a cameo appearance in the sixth season of the Canadian TV series Murdoch Mysteries. The episode, "The Ghost of Queens Park" aired in Canada on February 25, 2013. In it he played the eighth Lieutenant Governor of Ontario, Sir Oliver Mowat. In the 2023 episode "An Avoidable Hinder"(S16 Ep16) the end credits began with "In Memory of our Friend David Onley Former Lieutenant Governor of Ontario". He also served as founding president of the Aerospace Heritage Foundation of Canada.

== As Lieutenant Governor ==
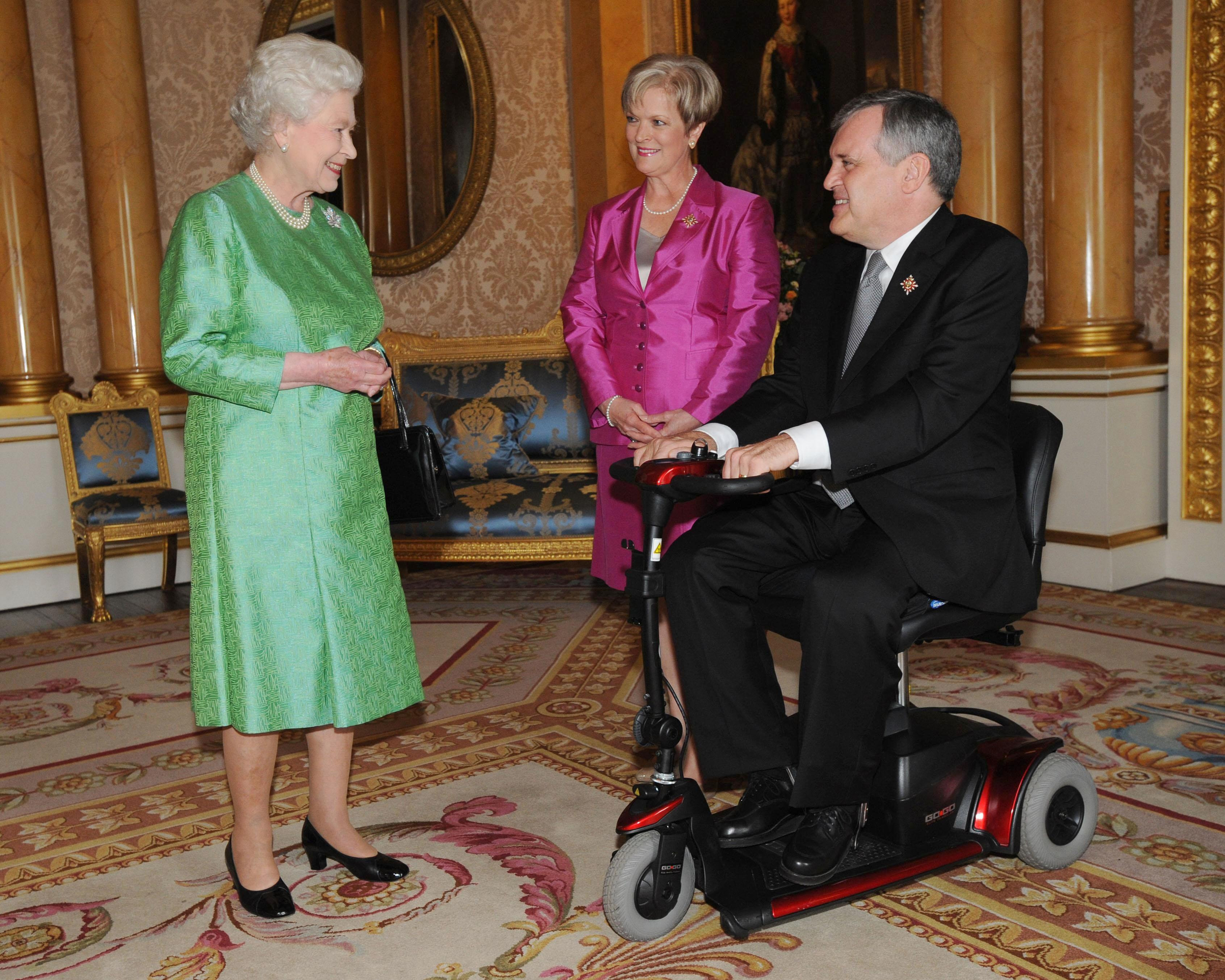
Queen Elizabeth II holds audience with Lieutenant Governor of Ontario David C. Onley at Buckingham Palace, 2008

Onley's appointment as Lieutenant Governor was announced on July 10, 2007; he was privately informed of this after a July 4, 2007, taping of Home Page: "I just had reached the top of the Don Valley Parkway... and there was no place to pull over. And when the Prime Minister of your country calls, all you can try to do is stay in the same lane, avoid any fender-benders and have a meaningful conversation, which I did."

He was sworn in on September 5, 2007, at Queen's Park in Toronto. As the province's first Lieutenant Governor with a disability, Onley said he would use his vice-regal position to help remove physical barriers to Ontario's 1.5 million people with disabilities, as well as focus on other issues affecting disabled people, including obstacles to employment and housing. Onley also stated, in his installation speech, that he would expand on his immediate predecessor James Bartleman's First Nations literacy initiatives, his aim being to see computers on every student's desk in northern schools. For his installation, Onley approached the legislature on his electric scooter, however he ascended the Throne on foot, using leg braces and canes.

During Onley's mandate, he participated in 2550 engagements, during which he spoke to an estimated audience of over one million people. He travelled to China to represent the Queen and Canada at the 2008 Summer Paralympics opening ceremony. Onley delivered his last speech from the throne to the Ontario Legislative Assembly on July 3, 2014; his last full day in office was September 22, 2014, with his successor sworn in the following afternoon.

Onley and his wife resided in their Scarborough home during his vice-regal tenure, as Ontario is one of three provinces that does not have an official vice-regal residence.

== Post-viceregal life ==
Onley was appointed senior lecturer in the Department of Political Sciences at University of Toronto Scarborough (UTSC), his alma mater. His appointment began on October 1, 2014. At UTSC he also served as special advisor on disability issues, encouraging the development of new initiatives including the founding of the Centre for Global Disability Studies. He also served as the university's special ambassador for the 2015 Pan American and Parapan American Games.

In 2018, Onley was appointed to review the act and conducted public consultations on the Accessibility for Ontarians with Disabilities Act (AODA). Onley conducted extensive consultations, and delivered a written Legislative Review of the AODA in 2019, available online. In the report, Onley raises concerns that based on consultations with disabled citizens and their family members, the province is not on track to meet 2025 AODA goals. The report offers concrete recommendations for improved implementation of the AODA, including calls to address the intersection of disability and poverty, and the need to take an "all-of-government approach by making accessibility the responsibility of every ministry" and clarify the relationship of the AODA to the Ontario Human Rights Code.

== Personal life and death ==
Onley was married to Ruth Ann, a Christian music performer. They have three sons, Jonathan, Robert and Michael. In late 2019, Onley received emergency medical treatment after a brain scan revealed that he had a tumour the size of an orange at the front of his brain, which was successfully removed.

Onley died at Sunnybrook Hospital in Toronto on January 14, 2023, aged 72. He is survived by his wife and three children. He was accorded an Ontario state funeral; following two days of lying in state at the Ontario Legislative Building, his funeral was held on January 30 at Yorkminster Park Baptist Church. Those in attendance included his successor Lieutenant Governor Elizabeth Dowdeswell and Ontario Premier Doug Ford. He is interred at Mount Pleasant Cemetery, Toronto.

== Honours and awards ==
Country	Order	Class or position	Years	Citation
Canada	Order of Canada	Member	2016–2023	
Canada	Order of Ontario	Chancellor	2007–2014	
Canada	Order of Ontario	Member	2007–2023	
Canada	Order of St. John	Vice-Prior of the Order of St. John in Ontario (2007–2014), Knight of Justice of the Order	2007–2023	

Country	Organization	Award or position	Year	Citation
Canada	Canadian Foundation for Physically Disabled Persons	King Clancy Award	1992	
Canada	Scarborough Women Teachers Association	Award for Broadcasting Excellence	1992	
Canada	Clarke Institute	Courage to Come Back Award	1996	
Canada	Terry Fox Hall of Fame	Inductee	1997–2023	
Canada	University of Toronto	Positive Impact Award	2001	
Canada	City of Scarborough	Scarborough Walk of Fame Inductee	2006–2023	
Canada	Our Lady of Lourdes Catholic High School	National Leadership Award	2009	

Academic honours

Country	Organization	Award or position	Year	Citation
Canada	Canada Christian College	Doctor of Laws (honoris causa)	date unknown	
Canada	Centennial College	Honorary Fellow	2003–2023	
Canada	University of Guelph-Humber	Doctor of Laws (honoris causa)	2008	
Canada	University of Windsor	Doctor of Laws (honoris causa)	2008	
Canada	University of Western Ontario	Doctor of Laws (jure dignitatis)	2008	
Canada	Nipissing University	Doctor of Education (honoris causa)	2009	
Canada	University of Toronto	Doctor of Laws (honoris causa)	2009	
Canada	York University	Doctor of Laws (honoris causa)	2009	
Canada	Carleton University	Doctor of Laws (honoris causa)	2011	
Canada	Law Society of Upper Canada	Doctor of Laws (honoris causa)	2013	

=== Ribbon bars ===

Ribbon	Description	Date	Notes
	Order of Canada	2016	Member (CM)
	Order of St. John	2007	Knight of Justice
	Order of Ontario	2007	Member (OOnt)
	125th Anniversary of the Confederation of Canada Medal	1992	Recipient
	Queen Elizabeth II Diamond Jubilee Medal	2012	Canadian version

=== Other distinctions ===
- He served as Colonel of the Regiment of The Queen's York Rangers in his capacity of Lieutenant Governor.
- He was the Honorary Colonel of 25 Field Ambulance in a personal capacity.
- Midland has a David Onley Park, dedicated on his 63rd birthday (June 12, 2013).

=== Coat of arms ===
Coat of arms of David Onley
Crest Issuant from a Loyalist civil coronet Azure a phoenix Or issuant from flames proper and holding in its beak a cane Azure; Escutcheon Azure on a pile reversed an open book Argent bound and charged with a Latin cross Azure; Supporters Two eagles wings elevated and addorsed Or each gorged with a coronet erablé Azure and standing on a grassy mount Vert set with three apples Gules slipped Or; Motto PER ARDUA AD ALTA (Latin for 'Through Difficulties to the Heights')

== Bibliography ==
- Shuttle: A Shattering Novel of Disaster in Space (1981) ISBN 0-89083-951-4 (book), ISBN 0-88646-826-4 (audio edition)

== See also ==
- Monarchy in Canada
- Monarchy in Ontario

Government offices
Preceded by James Bartleman	Lieutenant Governor of Ontario; 2007–2014	Succeeded by Elizabeth Dowdeswell
