= Bill Reid (center) =

American football player (born 1952)

No. 54
- Position: Center

Personal information
- Born: May 2, 1952 (age 74); Long Beach, California, U.S.
- Listed height: 6 ft 1 in (1.85 m)
- Listed weight: 242 lb (110 kg)

Career information
- High school: St. John Bosco (Bellflower, California)
- College: Stanford
- NFL draft: 1975: undrafted

Career history
- San Francisco 49ers (1975)

Awards and highlights
- PFWA All-Rookie Team (1975)

Career NFL statistics
- Games played: 13
- Games started: 13
- Stats at Pro Football Reference

William John Reid (born May 2, 1952) is an American former professional football player who was a center for the San Francisco 49ers of the National Football League (NFL). He played college football at Stanford University.
