= Billy Reid (baseball) =

American baseball player (1857–1940)

- Second baseman/Outfielder
- Born: May 17, 1857; London, Canada West
- Died: June 26, 1940 (aged 83); London, Ontario, Canada
- Batted: Left Threw: Right

MLB debut
- May 1, 1883, for the Baltimore Orioles

Last MLB appearance
- October 15, 1884, for the Pittsburgh Alleghenys

MLB statistics
- Batting average: .263
- Home runs: 0
- Runs batted in: 0
- Stats at Baseball Reference

Teams
- Baltimore Orioles (1883); Pittsburgh Alleghenys (1884)

William Alexander Reid (1857–1940) was a second baseman in Major League Baseball for the 1883 Baltimore Orioles and the 1884 Pittsburgh Alleghenys of the American Association. He continued to play in the minor leagues through 1888.

== Sources ==
- Career statistics from Baseball Reference · Retrosheet · Baseball Almanac
