= Billy Reid (footballer, born 1963) =

Scottish footballer

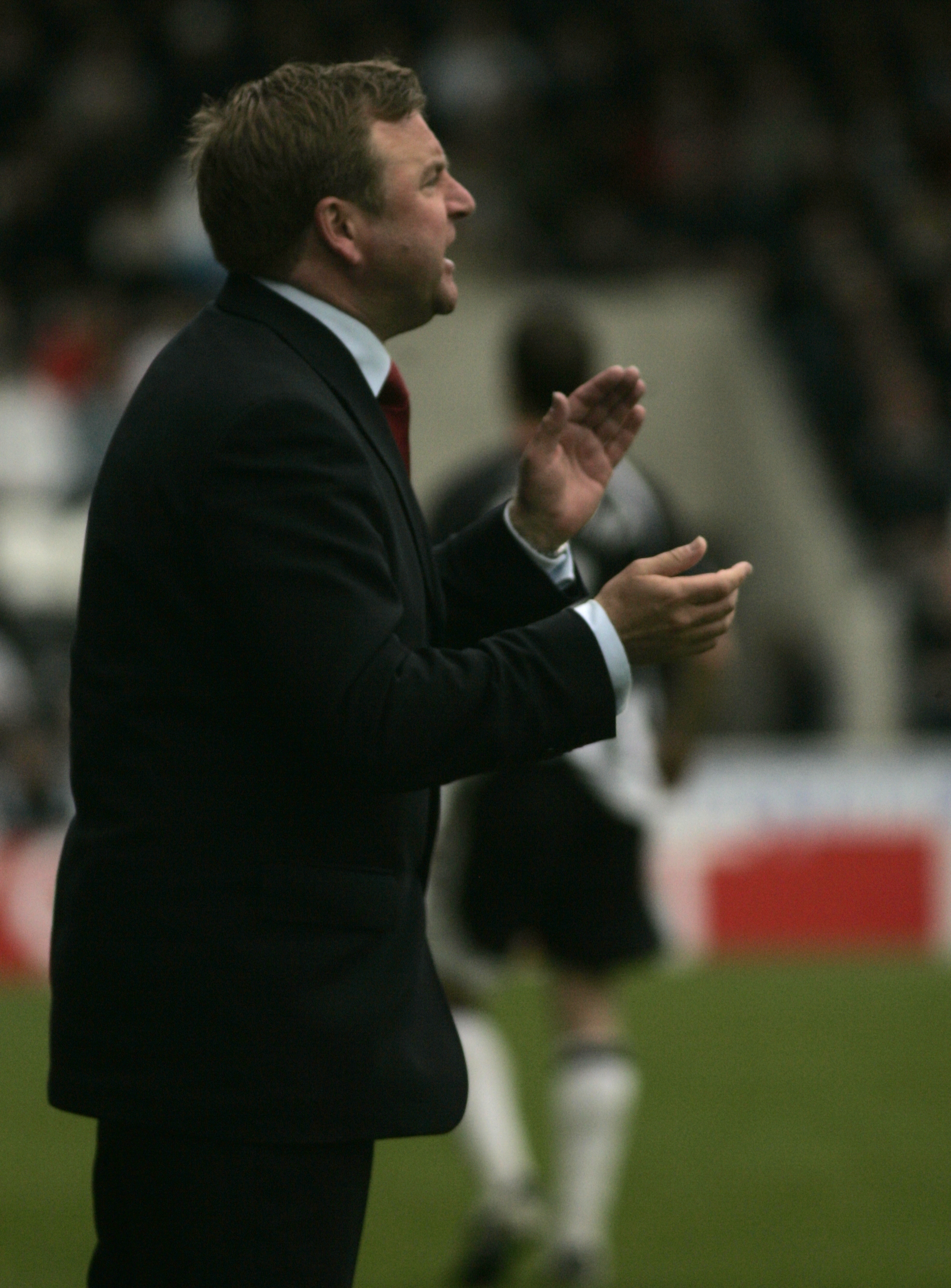
- Reid as manager of Hamilton Academical in 2009

Personal information
- Full name: William Reid
- Date of birth: 18 July 1963 (age 63)
- Place of birth: Glasgow, Scotland

Youth career
- Ashfield
- Petershill

Senior career*
Years	Team	Apps	(Gls)
1984–1989	Queen of the South	159	(22)
1989–1991	Clyde	67	(1)
1991–1994	Hamilton Academical	102	(7)
1994–1995	Stirling Albion	16	(0)
Total		344	(30)

Managerial career
- 2002: Clyde (caretaker)
- 2004–2005: Clyde
- 2005–2013: Hamilton Academical
- * Club domestic league appearances and goals

William Reid (born 18 July 1963) is a Scottish professional football coach and former player who is currently first-team coach at West Ham United.

Reid played for Queen of the South, Clyde, Hamilton Academical and Stirling Albion during the 1980s and 1990s. After a spell as caretaker manager of Clyde in 2002, he was appointed manager in 2004. After one season as Clyde manager, Reid was appointed manager of Hamilton. The club won promotion to the Scottish Premier League in 2008, when Reid also won the PFA Scotland Manager of the Year award. Despite being relegated in 2011, Reid continued as Hamilton manager until April 2013. In November 2013, he moved to Swedish club Östersund as an assistant coach.

== Playing career ==
In his playing days Reid started off at Dumfries club, Queen of the South where he was signed by Nobby Clark. Reid was later remembered by teammate Tommy Bryce as one of the best players at the club. The three were part of Queen's 1985–86 Scottish Second Division promotion success. It was at Queens where Reid gave his longest service as a player.

Reid then played for Clyde and Hamilton Academical before finishing his career with Stirling Albion. He worked as a printer while playing part-time.

== Coaching career ==
=== Clyde ===
Reid began his managerial career in 2002 with a caretaker appointment at a club he had played for, Scottish First Division club Clyde. This was in between the departure of Allan Maitland and the appointment of Alan Kernaghan. He took over the Bully Wee on a permanent basis in July 2004 following Kernaghan's two-year spell in charge. Reid took the club to third place in the 2004–05 Scottish First Division in his only season in charge.

=== Hamilton Academical ===
Reid then became manager at a club competing in the same division as Clyde and another which he had previously served as a player, Hamilton Academical, taking over from Allan Maitland, also a former Clyde boss. Working under owner Ronnie MacDonald, he took the Accies to the 2007–08 Scottish First Division title earning promotion to the Scottish Premier League. He won that season's PFA Scotland Manager of the Year award.

After leading Hamilton to an impressive seventh-place finish in the Scottish Premier League in 2009–10, Reid was linked with a move to a number of clubs including Swansea City, but rejected their approach claiming to have unfinished business with Hamilton. Hamilton were relegated from the top flight in 2011. Reid left Hamilton by mutual consent on 3 April 2013, after more than seven years in the job.

=== Östersund ===
Despite being linked to the manager's job at Morton, Reid became assistant manager at Östersund in November 2013 to Graham Potter. At the end of his second year in Sweden Östersund were runners-up in the 2015 Superettan earning promotion to the top flight. In 2017 they finished fifth in the league and won the 2016–17 Svenska Cupen. This earned a place in the 2nd qualification round of the 2017–18 UEFA Europa League in which they eliminated Galatasaray. They also eliminated PAOK before finishing second in the group behind Athletic Bilbao eliminating Zorya Luhansk and Hertha BSC. They were knocked out in the next round by Arsène Wenger's Arsenal 4–2 on aggregate.

=== Swansea City ===
Reid was appointed assistant manager at Swansea City on 11 June 2018, again working with Graham Potter. Swansea finished in 10th place in their first season back in the Championship after relegation from the Premier League. The Swans made the quarter final of the FA Cup controversially losing to Manchester City.

=== Brighton & Hove Albion ===
Potter was appointed as the new Brighton & Hove Albion manager on 20 May 2019 where Reid, coach Bjorn Hamberg and head of recruitment Kyle Macaulay moved to the Sussex club alongside Potter. Reid was set to take charge of Brighton's away fixture at Leicester City on 23 January 2022, due to Potter testing positive for COVID-19. However, Reid himself later tested positive meaning first team coach Björn Hamberg had to take charge of the 1–1 draw.

=== Chelsea ===
In September 2022, Reid moved to Chelsea from Brighton as Potter's assistant coach, along with attacking coach Bruno Saltor Grau, defensive coach Bjorn Hamberg, and goalkeeping coach Ben Roberts. Just over 6 months in, after a sustained run of poor results, Reid left Chelsea along with Potter.

=== West Ham United ===
On 9 January 2025, Reid was appointed first-team coach at West Ham United, once again supporting Graham Potter.

== Personal life ==
His son, Billy Jnr, was also a footballer, who played for Clyde.

== Managerial statistics ==
As of match played 2 April 2013

Team	From	To	Record				
Team	From	To	G	W	D	L	Win %
Clyde (caretaker)	8 February 2002	3 March 2002	3	1	2	0	33.3
Clyde	9 July 2004	2 June 2005	44	20	13	11	45.5
Hamilton Academical	2 June 2005	3 April 2013	343	129	83	131	37.6
Total			390	150	98	142	38.5

== Honours ==
=== Player ===
Queen of the South

- 1985–86 Scottish Second Division promotion

=== Manager ===
Hamilton Academical

- 2007–08 Scottish First Division champions
- 2007–08 PFA Scotland Manager of the Year

=== Assistant manager ===
Östersund

- 2015 Superettan promotion
- 2016–17 Svenska Cupen winners
