= The Grocer =

British trade magazine

- Categories: trade magazine
- Frequency: Weekly
- First issue: 1862
- Company: William Reed Business Media
- Country: United Kingdom
- Based in: Crawley, West Sussex
- Language: English
- Website: www.thegrocer.co.uk
- ISSN: 0017-4351
- OCLC: 6274400

The Grocer is a British digital and magazine service devoted to grocery sales, published by William Reed Ltd. It has been published since 1862.

== The Grocer 33 ==
A feature of the service is 'The Grocer 33'. This is a survey of each of the five leading supermarkets' (Asda, Morrisons, Sainsbury's, Tesco and Waitrose) prices and availability on a range of 33 popular lines and published in each issue. The survey is conducted by "mystery shoppers" and different branches in varying parts of the country are used for each week's survey. The supermarkets place prominence on this feature and ASDA heavily promotes the fact it has been the lowest-priced supermarket in The Grocer's survey for 25 years as of 2022.

== Industry awards ==
The Grocer runs a range of awards in the food retail industry, including:

- The Grocer Gold Awards
- The Grocer Own Label Food & Drink Awards
- The Grocer Food & Drink Awards
- Grocery Advertising and Marketing Industry Awards (Gramia)
- The Convenience Retail Awards
