= HOW TO Channel =

Australian television channel

- Country: Australia

Programming
- Language(s): English

Ownership
- Owner: Premier Media Group

History
- Launched: 2004
- Closed: 1 March 2011

HOW TO Channel was an Australian cable and satellite television channel. It was carried on the Foxtel Digital, Optus TV featuring Foxtel Digital and Austar Digital platforms. It was owned by Premier Media Group, a 50/50 joint venture of Publishing and Broadcasting Limited and News Corporation.

The channel mainly featured a range of DIY style programs. Technology programming sourced from TechTV and G4 from the United States, such as The Lab with Leo Laporte, Attack of the Show, and Call for Help also was carried on the network.

In December 2010, Foxtel announced that the How To Channel will cease on 1 March 2011, and will be replaced with LifeStyle HOME, a brand new channel completely dedicated to home and property. It will include programming from the current main Lifestyle Channel in addition to some existing programs from the How To Channel. This will be the third subsidiary channel for LifeStyle. Lifestyle HOME will broadcast on Foxtel/Austar digital channel 119 on both cable and satellite. Upon that, How To Channel was ceased airing overnight on 1 March 2011 around 4:00 am, to make room for Lifestyle HOME.
