= Billy Reid (footballer, born 1986) =

Scottish footballer

Personal information
- Full name: William Reid
- Date of birth: 11 January 1986 (age 40)
- Place of birth: Glasgow, Scotland
- Height: 5 ft 8 in (1.73 m)
- Position: Midfielder

Senior career*
Years	Team	Apps	(Gls)
2002–2004	Clyde	2	(0)
2004–2005	Hamilton Academical	0	(0)
2005	Clyde	0	(0)
- * Club domestic league appearances and goals

William Reid Jr. (born 11 January 1986 in Glasgow), is a Scottish retired footballer who played as midfielder for Clyde, and had a short spell with Hamilton Academical.

== Career ==
Reid started his career with Clyde. He made his senior debut in a Scottish First Division match against Ayr United in March 2003. He only made one more appearance after this, before being one of eight U19 players released by the club in January 2004.

He went on to join Hamilton Academical, before returning to Clyde a year later.

== Personal life ==
He is the son of football player and manager Billy Reid.
