= Willie Read =

WW I Royal Air Force officer (1885–1972)

Wing Commander Willie Read MC DFC AFC**
- Born: William Ronald Read; 17 May 1885
- Died: 1972 (aged 86–87)
- Military career
- Allegiance: United Kingdom
- Branch: British Army (1906–1918); Royal Air Force (1918–1932)
- Service years: 1906–1932
- Rank: Wing Commander
- Commands: RAF Boscombe Down; RAF Upavon; No. 216 Squadron RAF; No. 104 Squadron RFC
- Conflicts: First World War
- Awards: Military Cross; Distinguished Flying Cross; Air Force Cross & Two Bars

Wing Commander William Ronald Read, MC, DFC, AFC** (17 May 1885 − 1972) was a highly decorated Royal Air Force (RAF) officer of the First World War and the inter-war period. A pre-war member of the Royal Flying Corps (which became the RAF in 1918), he is one of only twelve officers to have so far received a second Bar to the Air Force Cross, signifying three awards of the medal.

== Early life and career ==
Read came from a wealthy family and was the eldest son of W. T. Read of Hampstead. Both his parents died when he was twelve and he and his siblings were raised by guardians. He was educated at Jesus College, Cambridge.

Read was commissioned a second lieutenant in the Hampshire Carabiniers, a yeomanry (part-time volunteer cavalry) regiment, on 23 September 1906. On 6 March 1907, after leaving Cambridge, he transferred to the 1st (King's) Dragoon Guards, a regular regiment. After obtaining his pilot's licence in April 1913, Read was seconded to the Royal Flying Corps as a pilot on 28 April 1914 and joined No. 3 Squadron RFC. He was promoted lieutenant on 14 June 1914.

== First World War ==
Read accompanied his squadron to France in August 1914. He was wounded in December 1914. On 8 February 1915, he was appointed a flight commander in the Royal Flying Corps with the temporary rank of captain. In December 1915 he was sent home to organise No. 45 Squadron RFC, returning to France in command in April 1916. He was awarded the Military Cross on 1 January 1916, and promoted to the substantive rank of captain on 19 August 1917. In April 1917, disillusioned with heavy losses and with his superiors, he requested and received a transfer back to his regiment. He did not much enjoy it, however, and returned to the RFC as the first commanding officer of No. 104 Squadron RFC, a bomber unit, in September 1917 with the acting rank of major.

Read was awarded the Air Force Cross (AFC) on 1 January 1919, and the Distinguished Flying Cross (DFC) on 3 June 1919 for services in France.

== Post-war ==
After the war Read remained in the Royal Air Force (RAF) with the rank of flight lieutenant, although technically still on attachment from his regiment. He served in Palestine with No. 216 Squadron from 1919 to 1921, and received a Bar to his AFC on 12 July 1920. By October 1921, he had been promoted to squadron leader in the RAF, although still holding the rank of captain in the army, and was in command of No. 216 Squadron.

On 17 November 1921, Read finally transferred from the army to a permanent commission in the RAF. He was awarded a second bar to his AFC in the 1922 New Year Honours. He was promoted wing commander on 1 January 1924. Having previously been commander of an apprentices' wing at RAF Halton, in January 1928 he became station commander of RAF Upavon, and he was appointed first commander of RAF Boscombe Down in September 1930. In March 1931, he was appointed Inspector of Recruiting for the RAF. He retired on 17 May 1932, his 47th birthday.

== Personal life ==
In December 1915, Read became engaged to Marjory Masters, daughter of an army chaplain. However, he seems to have never actually married. He was an amateur steeplechase rider, riding in many races, and tennis player.

Read's wartime diaries and papers are held by the Imperial War Museum.
