= Browns Run (South Fork Tenmile Creek tributary) =

River in Pennsylvania

Browns Run Tributary to South Fork Tenmile Creek
- Location of Browns Run mouth Browns Run (South Fork Tenmile Creek tributary) (the United States)

Location
- Country: United States of America
- State: Pennsylvania
- County: Greene
- Township: Morgan

Physical characteristics
- Source: divide between Castile Run and Grimes Run of South Fork Tenmile Creek
  - location: about 2 miles northwest of Mather, Pennsylvania
  - coordinates: 39°57′43″N 080°06′16″W
  - elevation: 1,120 ft (340 m)
- Mouth: South Fork Tenmile Creek
  - location: Mather, Pennsylvania
  - coordinates: 39°55′40″N 080°04′30″W
  - elevation: 853 ft (260 m)
- Length: 3.24 mi (5.21 km)
- Basin size: 2.29 square miles (5.9 km^{2})
- Discharge
  - average: 2.85 cu ft/s (0.081 m^{3}/s) at mouth with South Fork Tenmile Creek

Basin features
- Progression: south-southeast
- River system: Monongahela River
- Tributaries
  - left: unnamed tributaries
  - right: unnamed tributaries

Browns Run is a small tributary to South Fork Tenmile Creek in southwestern Pennsylvania. The stream rises in northeastern Greene County and flows south-southeast entering South Fork Tenmile Creek at Mather, Pennsylvania. The watershed is roughly 31% agricultural, 61% forested and the rest is other uses.
