= May 1928 =

Month of 1928

<<	May 1928					>>
Su	Mo	Tu	We	Th	Fr	Sa
		1	2	3	4	5
6	7	8	9	10	11	12
13	14	15	16	17	18	19
20	21	22	23	24	25	26
27	28	29	30	31

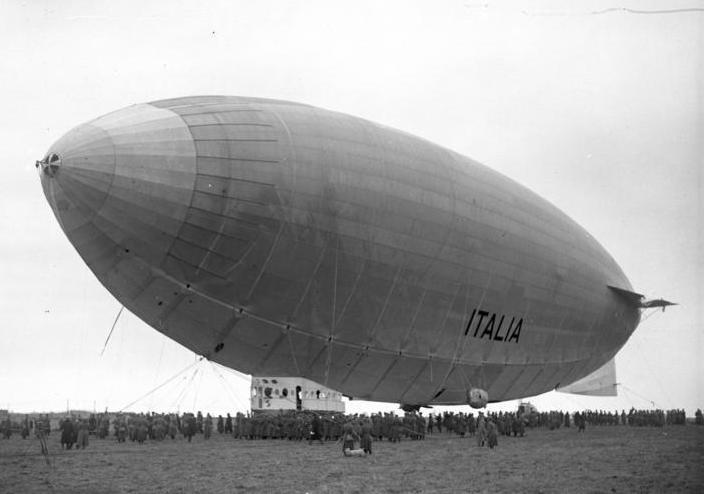
May 23, 1928: Airship Italia sets off from Norway with crew of 16 and goal of landing at the North Pole, crashes in Arctic two days later

The following events occurred in May 1928:

== Tuesday, May 1, 1928 ==
- Non-stop Flying Scotsman service between Edinburgh and London began.
- Al Smith received more votes than his two Democratic rivals combined in the California presidential primaries.
- Born: Desmond Titterington, Northern Irish racing driver, in Cultra, County Down (d. 2002)

== Wednesday, May 2, 1928 ==
- In recognition of their accomplishment of the first non-stop transatlantic airplane flight from east to west three weeks earlier, U.S. President Calvin Coolidge presented the nation's Distinguished Flying Cross to pilots Hermann Köhl and Ehrenfried Günther Freiherr von Hünefeld of Germany and James Fitzmaurice of Ireland. The award was authorized the same day for Francesco de Pinedo of Italy for his 1927 flight to four continents; and Joseph Le Brix and Dieudonné Costes of France for their flight around the world. The men were the first foreign citizens to receive the Cross, based on an amendment to the terms of the award approved the day before by the U.S. Congress.

== Thursday, May 3, 1928 ==
- The Jinan Incident happened in China when Chinese and Japanese soldiers clashed in Jinan, resulting in the death of 12 Japanese. Both sides blamed each other for the shooting, but Japanese officer Hikosuke Fukuda vowed to punish the Chinese for the incident after stockpiling food and ammunition.
- The town of Carnation, Washington, changed its name back to Tolt. The official name would remain until 1951, when the name would be changed to Carnation again.
- Born: Dave Dudley, country music singer, in Spencer, Wisconsin (d. 2003)
- Died:
  - Cai Gongshi, 47, Chinese emissary, was killed by Japanese soldiers in the Jinan Incident
  - Edgar Fahs Smith, 73, American scientist

== Friday, May 4, 1928 ==
- The League of Nations hosted a conference of scientists in Copenhagen trying to find a cure for syphilis.
- Born:
  - Maynard Ferguson, Canadian jazz musician and bandleader, in Verdun, Quebec (d. 2006)
  - Hosni Mubarak, 4th President of Egypt from 1981 to 2011; in Kafr-El Meselha (d. 2020)
  - Joseph Tydings, U.S. Senator, in Asheville, North Carolina (d. 2018)

== Saturday, May 5, 1928 ==
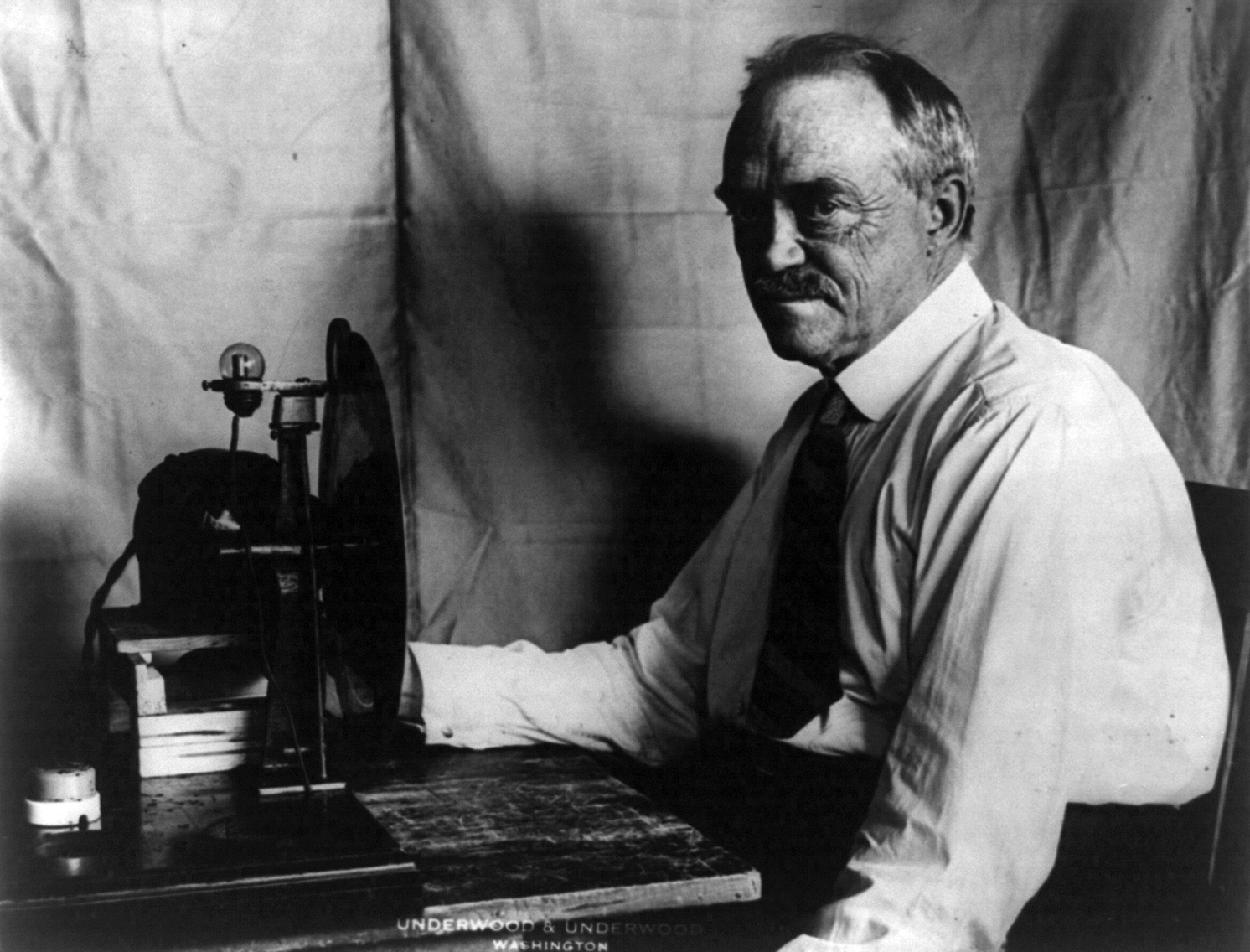
Jenkins

- Charles Francis Jenkins publicly demonstrated his new radio moving picture receiver in Washington, D.C. Government engineers, scientists and Federal Radio Commissioners sat in a darkened lab as well as in several homes with receiving sets. With the push of a button on the cabinet, silhouetted images of children at play were activated on the tiny screens.
- Swinton Lions defeated Featherstone Rovers 11–0 in the Northern Rugby League's Championship Final.

== Sunday, May 6, 1928 ==
- Red Star Olympique downed CA Paris 3–1 in French soccer's Coupe de France Final.

== Monday, May 7, 1928 ==
- Japanese General Hikosuke Fukuda issued a harsh ultimatum in Jinan with a 12-hour deadline to the Chinese which they would be sure to refuse.
- London's Daily Express published a shocking story detailing a plot by Prince Carol of Romania to overthrow the government and seize the throne held by his six-year-old son Michael. Carol, who was in England at the time with his mistress Magda Lupescu, was "requested" by British authorities to leave the country.
- The Equal Franchise Bill, or "Flapper Vote Bill", passed its third reading in the British House of Commons.
- Herbert Hoover won the Republican presidential primary in Maryland.

== Tuesday, May 8, 1928 ==
- Pope Pius XI issued the encyclical Miserentissimus Redemptor dealing with the Acts of Reparation.
- Hikosuke Fukuda ordered the resumption of hostilities when his ultimatum expired.
- James Eli Watson won the Republican presidential primary in Indiana.
- Born:
  - Gregory Scarpa, American mobster, in Brooklyn (d. 1994)
  - Ted Sorensen, American lawyer and speechwriter, in Lincoln, Nebraska (d. 2010)
- Died: Clara Williams, 40, American actress

== Wednesday, May 9, 1928 ==
- British scientist Sir Arthur Keith said in a lecture at the University of Manchester that no evidence had been found to support the belief that a spirit survives after the brain ceases to function.
- Born:
  - Ricardo "Pancho" Gonzales, U.S. professional tennis player, twice U.S. Open winner and winner of multiple professional titles; in Los Angeles (d. 1995)
  - Barbara Ann Scott, Canadian figure skater, in Ottawa (d. 2012)
  - Jean Smith, American baseball player in the All-American Girls Professional Baseball League from 1948 to 1954, in Ann Arbor, Michigan (d. 2011)

== Thursday, May 10, 1928 ==
- W2XCW, an experimental television station based in Schenectady, New York, went on the air. Kolin Hager became the first television newscaster, appearing three times a week to deliver farm and weather reports.
- Born:
  - Mel Lewis, jazz drummer and band leader, in Buffalo (d. 1990)
  - Lothar Schmid, chess player, in Germany (d. 2013)
  - Walt Yowarsky, American football player, in Cleveland. (d. 2014)

== Friday, May 11, 1928 ==
- The Chinese were pushed out of the Jinan region by the Japanese Army and sustained thousands of casualties.
- American Walter Hagen won the Open Championship golf tournament in England.
- The Edgar Wallace play The Squeaker premiered at London's Apollo Theatre.

== Saturday, May 12, 1928 ==
- Fascist Italy passed a new electoral bill. The all-appointed Senate was unchanged, but the Chamber of Deputies was now to be elected in the form of a plebiscite in which voters would simply vote "yes" or "no" to a single list of candidates approved by the Grand Council of Fascism. The bill also took the vote away from women. "Universal suffrage is a purely conventional fiction", Benito Mussolini explained. "It says nothing, means nothing, and gives the most divergent results."
- The Buster Keaton silent comedy film Steamboat Bill, Jr. was released.
- Born: Burt Bacharach, American pop music composer; in Kansas City, Missouri (d. 2023)

== Sunday, May 13, 1928 ==
- The Battle of La Flor began in Nicaragua.
- The John Ford-directed silent film Hangman's House was released.
- Born:
  - Jim Shoulders, U.S. rodeo cowboy and rancher, in Henryetta, Oklahoma (d. 2007);
  - Édouard Molinaro, French film director and screenwriter, in Bordeaux (d. 2013)
- Died: Ida Boy-Ed, 76, German writer

== Monday, May 14, 1928 ==
- A powerful earthquake hit Chachapoyas, Peru, killing 25 people.
- The Battle of La Flor ended in a Sandinista victory.

== Tuesday, May 15, 1928 ==
- The Flood Control Act was passed in the United States, authorizing the Army Corps of Engineers to design and construct projects to control flooding.
- Al Smith and Herbert Hoover won the New Jersey presidential primaries of their respective parties.
- A test screening was held for the animated short film Plane Crazy, featuring the first appearance of Mickey Mouse. It was shelved until 1929.

== Wednesday, May 16, 1928 ==
- A panic on Wall Street caused stocks to plunge by as many as forty points, as a record 4,820,840 shares changed hands. The fall was triggered by selling of shares in aircraft companies.
- The House of Lords debated the matter of whether a husband should be allowed to disinherit wives and children in favour of mistresses.
- Born: Billy Martin, baseball player and manager, in Berkeley, California (d. 1989)

== Thursday, May 17, 1928 ==
- The 1928 Summer Olympics opened in Amsterdam in the Netherlands with competition in field hockey more than two months before the main events of the games. A welcoming ceremony was held before a crowd of 4,000 people. The official opening ceremony would not be held until July 28.
- The Royal Flying Doctor Service began operations, on a one-year experimental basis, as a service of the Australian Inland Mission. Founded by Presbyterian minister John Flynn, the AIM Aerial Medical Service initially had its home base at Cloncurry, Queensland.

== Friday, May 18, 1928 ==
- Japan warned China that it may have to establish a protectorate in Manchuria to guard its own interests if peace could not be maintained.
- A bomb exploded at the home of Robert G. Elliott, the executioner of New York State. The list of those he had electrocuted included Sacco and Vanzetti and Ruth Snyder.
- Born: Pernell Roberts, American TV actor known for Bonanza and as the title character in Trapper John, M.D.; in Malibu, California (d. 2010)

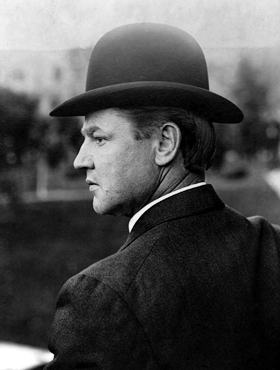
Haywood

- Died: Bill Haywood, 59, American labor leader and founder of the Industrial Workers of the World

== Saturday, May 19, 1928 ==
- The Mather Mine disaster claimed 195 lives in a coal mine explosion in Mather, Pennsylvania.
- Reigh Count won the Kentucky Derby.
- Nazis in Berlin attacked a procession of communists demonstrating on the eve of elections. Twenty were wounded and a child was killed, marring the election campaign which had been remarkably uneventful up to this point.
- Born:
  - Colin Chapman, British automobile designer and founder of Lotus Cars, in Richmond, London (d. 1982)
  - Gil McDougald, U.S. baseball player; in San Francisco (d. 2010)
- Died: Max Scheler, 53, German philosopher

== Sunday, May 20, 1928 ==
- Elections for the 491 seats of Germany's parliament were held in the Weimar Republic. The Social Democratic Party, led by Hermann Müller remained the largest party in the Reichstag. The Nazi Party only won 12 seats and received 2.6% of the vote.

== Monday, May 21, 1928 ==
- A phosgene leak in Hamburg killed 11 people.
- The part-silent, part-sound drama film The Lion and the Mouse was released, marking the first time Lionel Barrymore spoke from the screen.
- Born: Alice Drummond, American actress, in Pawtucket, Rhode Island (d. 2016)

== Tuesday, May 22, 1928 ==
- The Capper-Ketcham Act for promotion of educating American youth in agricultural techniques, was passed into law in the United States. Sponsored by U.S. Senator Arthur Capper of Kansas and Congressman John C. Ketcham of Michigan, the act financed the founding of the Future Farmers of America and provided matching funds for states with 4-H clubs.
- A mine explosion in Yukon, West Virginia, killed 17 employees.
- A mine explosion the same day in Kenvir, Kentucky, killed eight miners.
- Died: Francisco López Merino, 23, Argentine poet, committed suicide

== Wednesday, May 23, 1928 ==
- The airship Italia, crewed by sixteen men led by Umberto Nobile, departed from Svalbard in a bid to fly over the North Pole just as the Norge had done in 1926. The crew hoped this time to actually land at the North Pole.
- A bomb exploded at the Italian consulate in Buenos Aires, killing 8 and injuring 37. The Italian consul general blamed anti-fascist extremists.
- Born:
  - Jeannie Carson, English comedienne and actress, as Jean Shufflebottom in Pudsey, West Yorkshire (d. 2022)
  - Rosemary Clooney, U.S. cabaret singer and actress, in Maysville, Kentucky (d. 2002)

== Thursday, May 24, 1928 ==
- The airship Italia passed over the North Pole at midnight.
- In the U.S. Senate, opponents of the Muscle Shoals Bill conducted a filibuster that continued into the next day.
- Protestors in Innsbruck, Austria tore down the flag over the Italian consulate that was flying in commemoration of the thirteenth anniversary of the Italian declaration of war on Austria-Hungary.
- Born: Adrian Frutiger, Swiss sans serif typeface designer noted for the Univers font; in Unterseen (d. 2015)

== Friday, May 25, 1928 ==
- The crew of the Italia crashed, 180 miles (290 km) from Svalbard. One member of the crew was killed. The ship lurched back into the air with six men still trapped inside the cabin and drifted away, never to be seen again.
- The Muscle Shoals Bill and the Boulder Dam Bill were passed in Congress.
- The U.S. Senate tried to override President Coolidge's veto of the McNary–Haugen Farm Relief Bill, but failed to get the two-thirds majority necessary.

== Saturday, May 26, 1928 ==
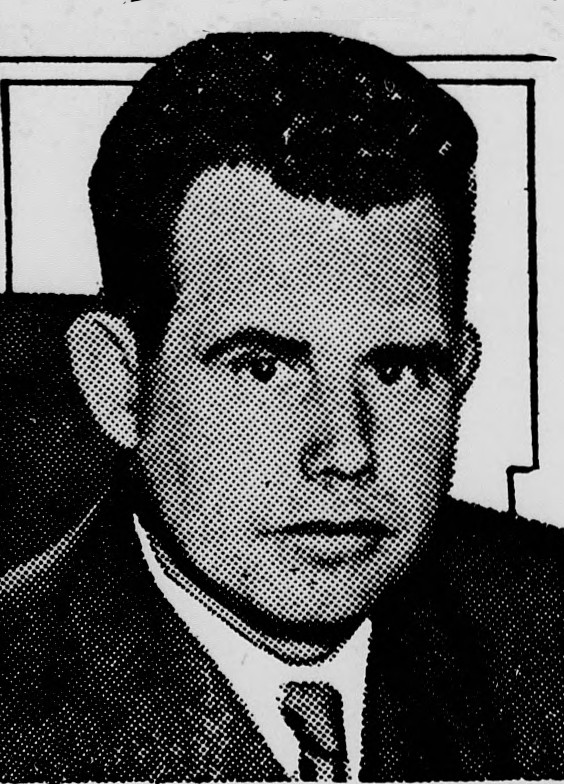
Payne

- Andy Payne won the first 3,400-mile (5,500 km) coast-to-coast "Trans-American Footrace", arriving in New York City 84 days after starting in Los Angeles.
- The first-ever Palestine Cup was awarded to Hapoel Allenby Tel Aviv when they defeated Maccabi Hasmonean Jerusalem 2–0.
- Angry mobs in Dalmatia and Slovenia attacked Italian consulates in protest of the Nettuno Convention which was nearing ratification.
- Jantzen Beach Amusement Park opened on Hayden Island in Portland, Oregon.
- Rye Playland was opened to the public. Construction of Rye Playland had begun in September 1927.
- Born: Jack Kevorkian, American pathologist and physician-assisted suicide activist; in Pontiac, Michigan (d. 2011 of a heart attack)

== Sunday, May 27, 1928 ==
- The silent film Tempest starring John Barrymore was released.

== Monday, May 28, 1928 ==
- Anti-Italian demonstrators in Belgrade burned Mussolini's portrait as protests of the Nettuno Convention became increasingly violent. Dispatches from Zadar reported that Italians attacked Yugoslav residents and burned a picture of King Alexander.
- The Boulder Dam Bill was filibustered in the U.S. Senate into the next day.

== Tuesday, May 29, 1928 ==
- Automobile manufacturers Dodge and Chrysler announced a merger worth $235 million.
- The U.S. Senate adjourned after the session on the Boulder Dam Bill lasted more than 31 hours due to filibustering.

== Wednesday, May 30, 1928 ==
- A civilian was killed and many wounded in Belgrade after police opened fire to put down anti-Italian rioting.
- Kuomintang forces captured Baoding, less than 100 miles from Beijing.
- Louis Meyer won the Indianapolis 500.

== Thursday, May 31, 1928 ==
- A four-man crew of two Australians and two Americans took off in the Fokker F.VII Southern Cross from Oakland, California, attempting to make the first ever trans-Pacific flight to Australia.
- The Yugoslav National Assembly was adjourned for a week after opposition members tore the tops off of desks, pounded fists and shouted against the methods of police suppressing anti-Italian demonstrations.
