= Barrs Run (Tenmile Creek tributary) =

Stream in Pennsylvania, USA

Barrs Run Tributary to Tenmile Creek
- Location of Barrs Run mouth Barrs Run (Tenmile Creek tributary) (the United States)

Location
- Country: United States
- State: Pennsylvania
- County: Washington

Physical characteristics
- Source: Castile Run divide
  - location: about 0.25 miles east of Marianna, Pennsylvania
  - coordinates: 39°59′44″N 080°06′51″W
  - elevation: 1,190 ft (360 m)
- Mouth: Tenmile Creek
  - location: Old Zollarsville, Pennsylvania
  - coordinates: 40°00′37″N 080°04′32″W
  - elevation: 846 ft (258 m)
- Length: 2.55 mi (4.10 km)
- Basin size: 2.68 square miles (6.9 km^{2})
- Discharge
  - location: Tenmile Creek
  - average: 3.36 cu ft/s (0.095 m^{3}/s) at mouth with Tenmile Creek

Basin features
- Progression: northeast
- River system: Monongahela River
- Tributaries
  - left: unnamed tributaries
  - right: unnamed tributaries
- Bridges: Adamson Road, Barr Run Road (x3), Clarksville Road

Barrs Run is a 2.55-mile-long (4.10 km) 2nd order tributary to Tenmile Creek, in Washington County, Pennsylvania.

== Course ==
Barrs Run rises about 0.25 miles east of Marianna, Pennsylvania. It then flows northeast to join Tenmile Creek at Old Zollarsville.

== Watershed ==
Barrs Run drains 2.68 square miles (6.9 km^{2}) of area, receives about 40.6 in/year of precipitation, has a wetness index of 310.46 and is about 66% forested.

== See also ==
- List of rivers of Pennsylvania
