= April 1928 =

Month of 1928

<<	April 1928					>>
Su	Mo	Tu	We	Th	Fr	Sa
1	2	3	4	5	6	7
8	9	10	11	12	13	14
15	16	17	18	19	20	21
22	23	24	25	26	27	28
29	30

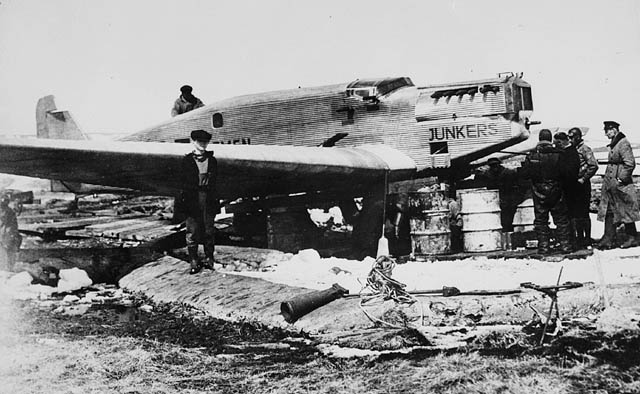
April 13, 1928: Trio of pilots land in Canada in the German airplane Bremen, finish first east-to-west airplane flight over the Atlantic Ocean

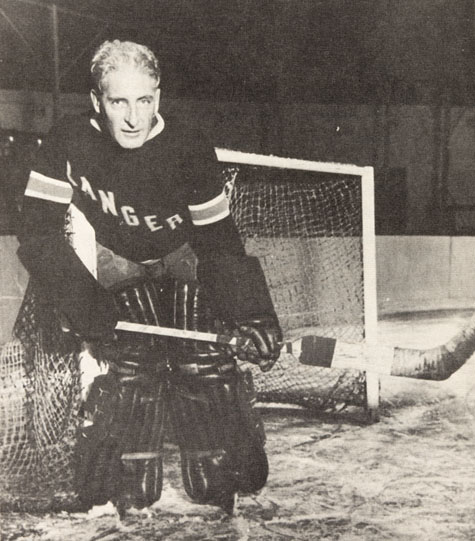
April 7, 1928: New York Rangers' Coach Lester Patrick puts himself in NHL Stanley Cup game after his goalie is injured

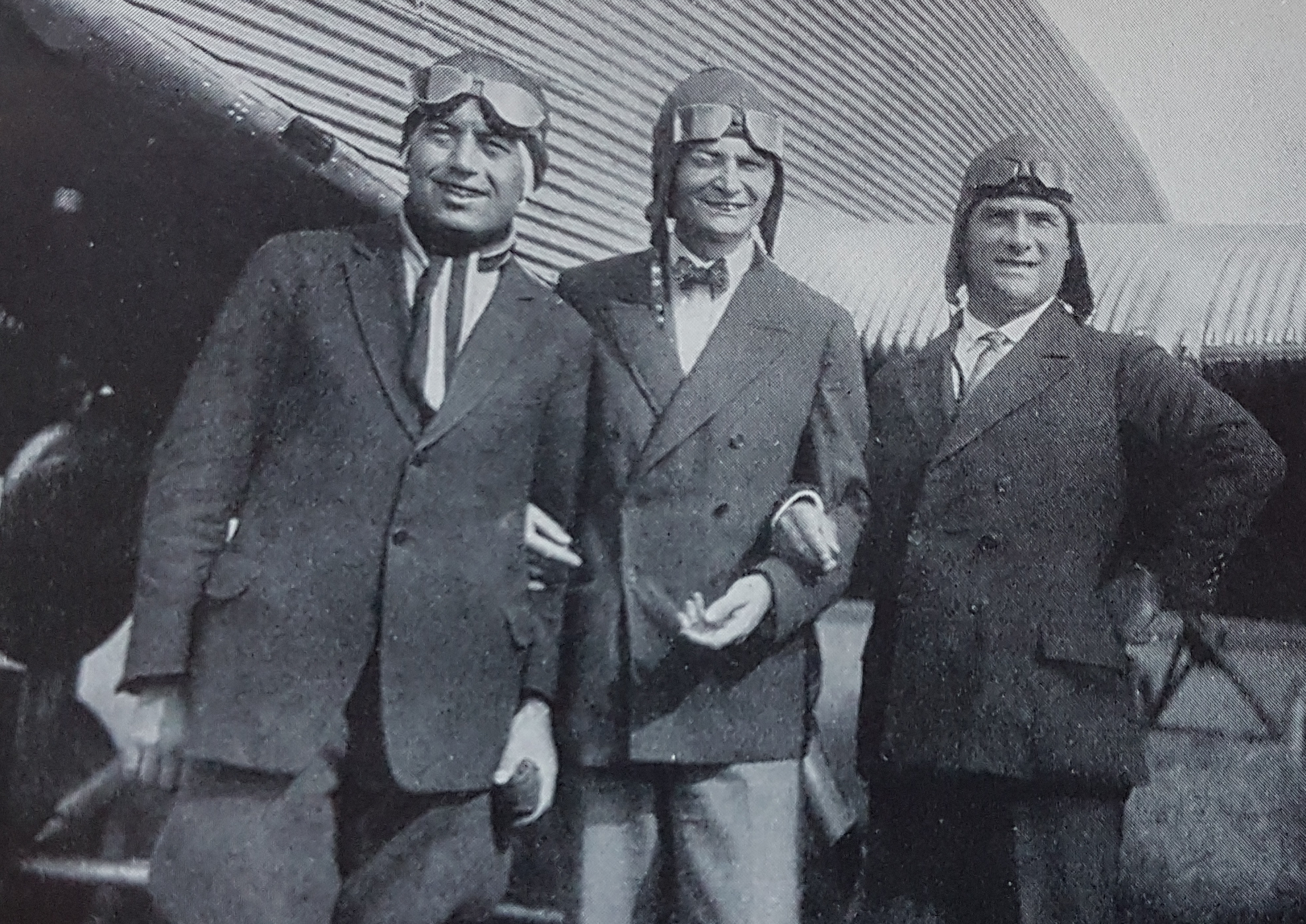
Bremen pilots Fitzmaurice, von Hünefeld and Köhl

The following events occurred in April 1928:

== Sunday, April 1, 1928 ==
- The Cinematograph Films Act, mandating that British cinemas show a quota of British films, came into force in the United Kingdom.
- French Prime Minister Raymond Poincaré expressed hope that Prohibition would be repealed in the United States, which would help to bolster France's wine industry.
- A worldwide truck and bus brand, DAF Trucks was founded in the Netherlands, as predecessor of Hub van Doorne workshop.
- Born:
  - George Grizzard, actor, in Roanoke Rapids, North Carolina (d. 2007)
  - Mykhaylo Koman, footballer and coach, in Ľubotín, Czechoslovakia (d. 2015)

== Monday, April 2, 1928 ==
- An official announcement in Italy said that the plans to make the Grand Council of Fascism the primary body of the state would be postponed until fall in order to permit time for further study.
- A peace conference between Poland and Lithuania broke down over the issue of Vilnius, which both sides perceived as their own.
- Born:
  - Jeanine Belkhodja, Algerian doctor, communist and National Liberation Front (Algeria) activist, in Algiers (d. 2013)
  - Serge Gainsbourg, French singer, in Paris (d. 1991)
  - Piet Römer, Dutch film and TV actor; in Amsterdam (d. 2012)
- Died: Theodore W. Richards, 60, American chemist and 1914 Nobel laureate for his measurements of atomic weights

== Tuesday, April 3, 1928 ==
- U.S. presidential candidate Al Smith carried Wisconsin, Maine, and New York in the Democratic presidential primaries.

== Wednesday, April 4, 1928 ==
- The court martial of Captain Kenneth Dewar began in the "Royal Oak Mutiny" affair.
- Born:
  - Maya Angelou, American author and poet; in St. Louis (d. 2014)
  - Estelle Harris, American character actress and comedian; in Manhattan (d. 2022)

== Thursday, April 5, 1928 ==
- The ocean liner SS Leviathan was hit by a 100-foot high wave that damaged the upper deck and flooded some of the third-class accommodations. It still managed to reach New York City on time four days later.
- Died:
  - Chauncey Depew, 93, American attorney and politician
  - Roy Kilner, 37, English cricketer (enteric fever)
  - Viktor Oliva, 66, Czech painter

== Friday, April 6, 1928 ==
- Fascist politician Renato Ricci issued a circular ordering that handshaking be ceased as a social custom in Italy, calling it unhygienic and excessive.
- The University of Houston student newspaper The Daily Cougar was first published.
- Born:
  - James Watson, American molecular biologist and 1962 Nobel Prize laureate for his description of the double helix structure of the DNA molecule; in Chicago (d. 2025)
  - Joi Lansing, American model, actress and singer, in Salt Lake City (d. 1972)

== Saturday, April 7, 1928 ==
- During the second period of Game Two of the Stanley Cup Finals between the New York Rangers and Montreal Maroons, Rangers goaltender Lorne Chabot was forced out of the game by a puck to the eye. Unable to secure an adequate replacement, Rangers coach Lester Patrick inserted himself into the game as the goaltender despite being 44 years old and only having limited experience at the position. Patrick allowed a goal in the third period, but Frank Boucher scored in overtime to give the Rangers an unlikely 2–1 victory.
- Kuomintang forces led by Chiang Kai-shek launched a new offensive aimed at capturing Beijing.
- The Harold Lloyd silent comedy film Speedy was released.
- Born:
  - James Garner, American actor and comedian known for Maverick and The Rockford Files, in Norman, Oklahoma (d. 2014)
  - Alan J. Pakula, American film director, writer and producer, in the Bronx (d. 1998)
  - James White, Northern Irish author, in Belfast (d. 1999)

== Sunday, April 8, 1928 ==
- One person was killed and thirty injured in an early morning subway train collision in Queens, New York.
- The National Challenge Cup Final between the New York Nationals and Illinois Bricklayers before a crowd of 16,000 at the Polo Grounds in New York City ended in a 1–1 draw. A rematch was arranged for the following week in Chicago.
- Born: Eric Porter, British actor, in Shepherd's Bush, London (d. 1995)

== Monday, April 9, 1928 ==
- The silent film Street Angel premiered at the Globe Theatre in New York City.
- The United States Supreme Court decided Baltimore & Ohio Railroad Co. v. United States.
- Born: Tom Lehrer, American musician, satirist and mathematician, in New York City

== Tuesday, April 10, 1928 ==
- Pineapple Primary: In elections in Illinois, every candidate associated with Chicago Mayor William H. Thompson was defeated in a vote against gangsterism. Additionally, Frank O. Lowden and Al Smith won the Illinois Republican and the Democratic presidential primaries, respectively.

== Wednesday, April 11, 1928 ==
- The Labour-Farmer Party of Japan was ordered to dissolve due to alleged ties to communists.
- Born: Ethel Kennedy, American human rights activist and widow of Robert F. Kennedy; as Ethel Skakel, in Chicago (d. 2024)

== Thursday, April 12, 1928 ==
- A bomb concealed in a lamppost exploded in Milan, Italy just before 10 a.m, killing fifteen people. It was probably an attempt on the life of King Victor Emmanuel III as it went off ten minutes ahead of a royal procession to open the city's fair.
- An international crew of three men – Germans Hermann Köhl and Ehrenfried Günther Freiherr von Hünefeld and Irishman James Fitzmaurice – took off from Baldonnel Aerodrome southwest of Dublin, Ireland aboard the Bremen, a Junkers W 33 aircraft, at 5:38 a.m., in an attempt to make the first east-to-west transatlantic flight. Their destination was Mitchel Field on Long Island.
- The U.S. Senate passed another version of the McNary–Haugen Farm Relief Bill, though President Calvin Coolidge was widely expected to veto this bill as he had all the previous iterations.
- Born: Jean-François Paillard, French orchestra conductor, in Vitry-le-François (d. 2013)

== Friday, April 13, 1928 ==
- The crew of the Bremen completed their transatlantic flight by touching down on Greenly Island, Canada around noon after encountering engine problems.
- An explosion killed thirty-seven people in a dance hall in West Plains, Missouri. The cause of the explosion was never determined.
- U.S. Secretary of State Frank B. Kellogg submitted a plan to the Locarno Powers for the renunciation of war as an instrument of foreign policy.

== Saturday, April 14, 1928 ==
- The New York Rangers won the Stanley Cup, defeating the Montreal Maroons 2–1 to win the series which went a full five games. The entire series had to be played in Montreal because Madison Square Garden was unavailable due to the circus being in town.
- Swinton Lions defeated Warrington Wolves 5–3 to win the Challenge Cup of rugby.
- Born: Ezra Fleischer, Romanian dissident, later Israeli writer, in Timișoara (d. 2006)

== Sunday, April 15, 1928 ==
- A relief plane landed at Greenly Island to assist the crew of the Bremen, who were determined to repair their plane and fly it to their original destination of New York City.
- In the United States Soccer Federation, the New York Nationals defeated the Illinois Bricklayers 3–0 in the National Challenge Cup Final before a crowd of 15,000 at Soldier Field in Chicago.

== Monday, April 16, 1928 ==
- Four masked men robbed a train near Chicago.
- A libel trial opened in Cobourg, Ontario, initiated by General Sir Arthur Currie against a writer and the publisher of the Port Hope Evening Guide. Currie claimed that an article published in the newspaper defamed him by alleging that he wasted Canadian lives by ordering an assault in Mons on November 11, 1918, for no reason other than to have it be recorded that Canadians had fired the last shot of the war.
- NBC received the first television station construction permit.

== Tuesday, April 17, 1928 ==
- Calvin Coolidge gave a press conference on the Flood Control Act of 1928 that had recently been passed by the US Senate. He stated costs were estimated to be up to $1,500,000,000 because of lumber companies selling affected land at extortionate prices.
- Born: Cynthia Ozick, American author, in New York City

== Wednesday, April 18, 1928 ==
- A 7.0 magnitude earthquake shook Plovdiv Province, Bulgaria, killing 127 and doing heavy structural damage in one of the most serious earthquakes in the country's history.

== Thursday, April 19, 1928 ==
- Clarence DeMar won the Boston Marathon for the sixth time.
- Born:
  - Alexis Korner, blues musician and radio broadcaster, in Westminster, London (d. 1984);
  - Sultan Azlan Shah of Perak, in Batu Gajah, British Malaya (d. 2014)
- Died:
  - Charles Birger, 46, American bootlegger
  - Dorus Rijkers, 81, Dutch sailor and folk hero

== Friday, April 20, 1928 ==
- US President Calvin Coolidge held a press conference to discuss the summer vacation, flood relief, and street railroads in Washington, D.C.
- Born: Robert Byrne, American chess player (d. 2013)

== Saturday, April 21, 1928 ==
- Blackburn Rovers defeated Huddersfield Town 3–1 in the FA Cup Final at Wembley Stadium.
- Born: Jack Evans, Welsh-born Canadian ice hockey player and coach; in Garnant (d. 1996)

== Sunday, April 22, 1928 ==
- The Greek city of Corinth was hit by a 5.25 magnitude earthquake, killing twenty people and destroying three thousand houses in the region.
- Legislative elections were held in France; candidates affiliated with Prime Minister Raymond Poincaré did well in the first round going into runoffs the following week.
- The King Vidor-directed silent comedy-drama film The Patsy, starring Marion Davies, was released.
- Died:
  - Warner B. Bayley, 82, U.S. Navy engineer who investigated the 1898 sinking of the U.S.S. Maine
  - Frank Currier, 70, American film actor and director

== Monday, April 23, 1928 ==
- Rebels loyal to Augusto César Sandino, calling themselves the Sandinistas, captured American-owned mines in eastern Nicaragua and took five workers hostage.

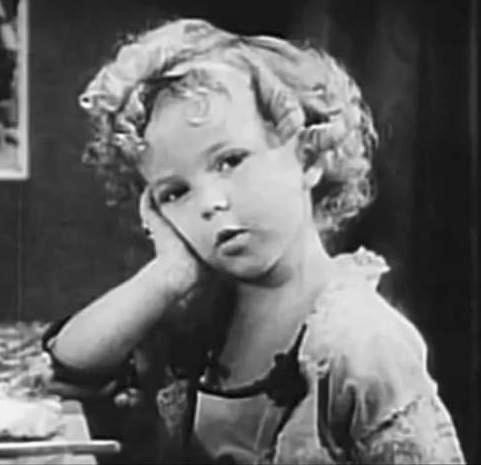
Temple

- Born: Shirley Temple, American child film star and later U.S. Ambassador Shirley Temple Black; in Santa Monica, California (d. 2014)

== Tuesday, April 24, 1928 ==
- Chancellor of the Exchequer Winston Churchill presented the annual budget to the House of Commons.
- The Supreme Court of Canada ruled that women were not eligible to be appointed to the Senate.

== Wednesday, April 25, 1928 ==
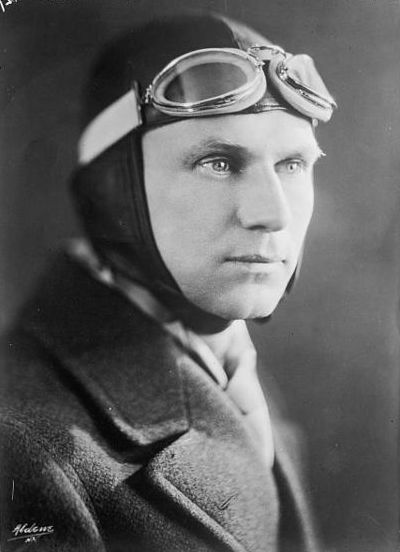
Bennett

- Days after helping rescue the crew of the Bremen after it had crashed in Canada during the first east to west Transatlantic crossing by airplane, 37-year-old American aviator and Medal of Honor recipient Floyd Bennett died of pneumonia in a hospital in Quebec City, at 10:45 in the morning. The crew of the Bremen decided to abandon their attempt to fly from Greenly Island to New York City and left the plane there for the time being.
- American race car driver Frank Lockhart, 25, was killed at Daytona Beach trying to set a new land speed record.
- Born: Cy Twombly, American painter, in Lexington, Virginia (d. 2011)
- Died: Pyotr Nikolayevich Wrangel, 49, Baltic-German general of the White Army in the Russian Civil War

== Thursday, April 26, 1928 ==
- The musical stage comedy Present Arms!, with music by Richard Rodgers and lyrics by Lorenz Hart and starring Joyce Barbour and Busby Berkeley, opened at Lew Fields' Mansfield Theatre on Broadway.
- In Iowa, Atlantic High School beat Griswold High, 109 runs to 0, in the most lopsided victory in U.S. high school baseball history.

== Friday, April 27, 1928 ==
- Floyd Bennett was laid to rest at Arlington National Cemetery. Thousands stood in the rain to pay their respects.
- The Paul Leni-directed silent film The Man Who Laughs premiered at the Central Theatre in New York City.
- The Piccadilly Theatre opened in the City of Westminster, London.
- Died: Martin B. Madden, 73, U.S. Congressman for Chicago since 1905

== Saturday, April 28, 1928 ==
- The Big 9 Conference, now a 12-team athletic conference of Minnesota high schools, was founded.
- Born:
  - Richard Baer, writer and screenwriter, in New York City (d. 2008)
  - Yves Klein, artist, in Nice (d. 1962)
  - Eugene Merle Shoemaker, geologist, in Los Angeles (d. 1997)
- Died:
  - Gertrude Claire, 75, American actress
  - Alessandro Guidoni, 47, Italian Air Force general (parachute test accident)

== Sunday, April 29, 1928 ==
- Runoffs were held in the French legislative elections; Prime Minister Raymond Poincaré was given a strong majority.
- Benito Mussolini presided over a labour demonstration of ten thousand Milanese at the Colosseum in Rome. "After six years of the Fascist regime I can say that no government has done so much for the labouring masses as fascism", Mussolini told the gathering.

== Monday, April 30, 1928 ==
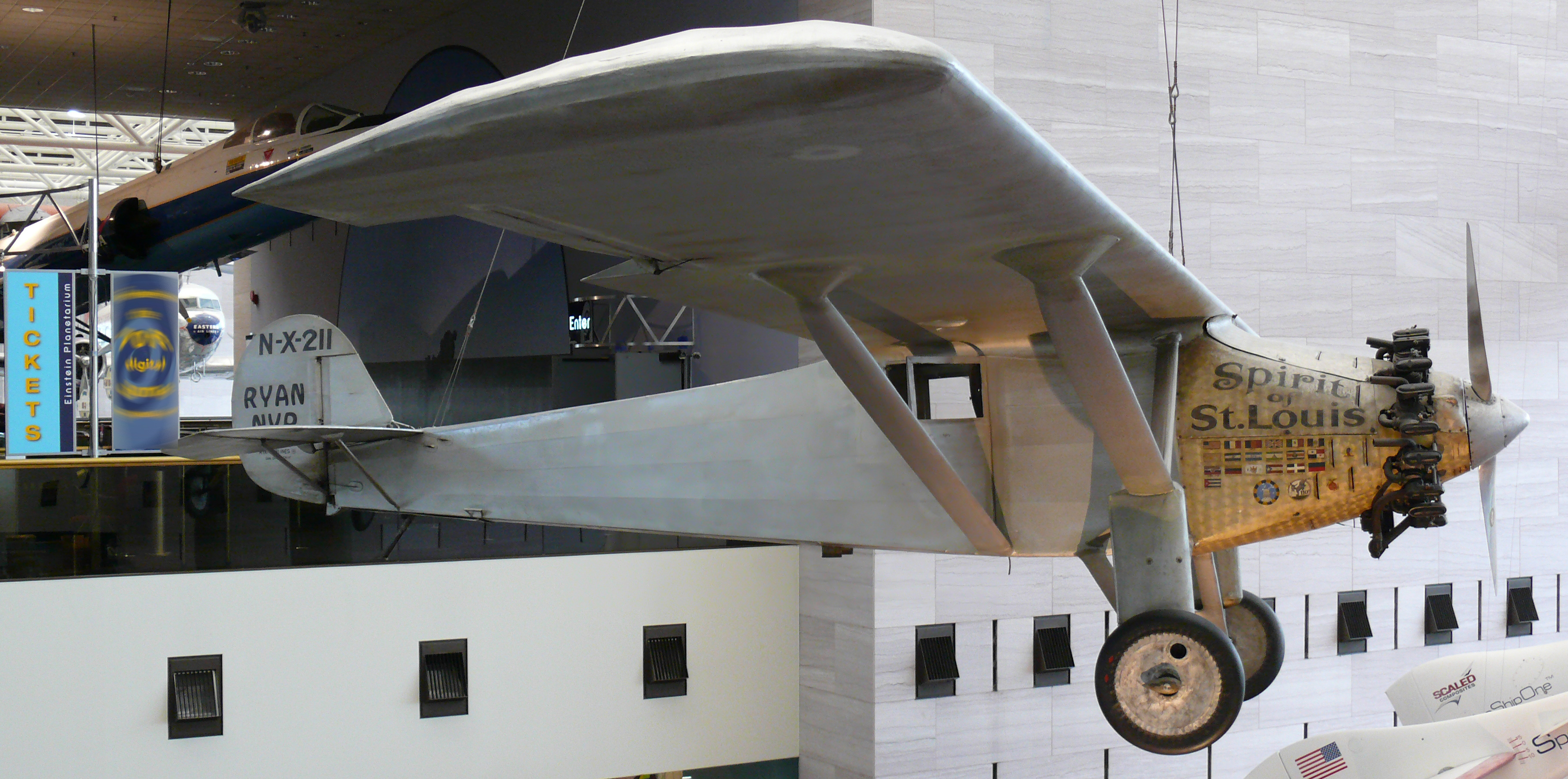
The original Spirit in Washington

- Charles Lindbergh flew the Spirit of St. Louis one last time, to Washington, D.C., so that it could be retired and placed on permanent exhibition at the Smithsonian Institution.
