= Mather Mine disaster =

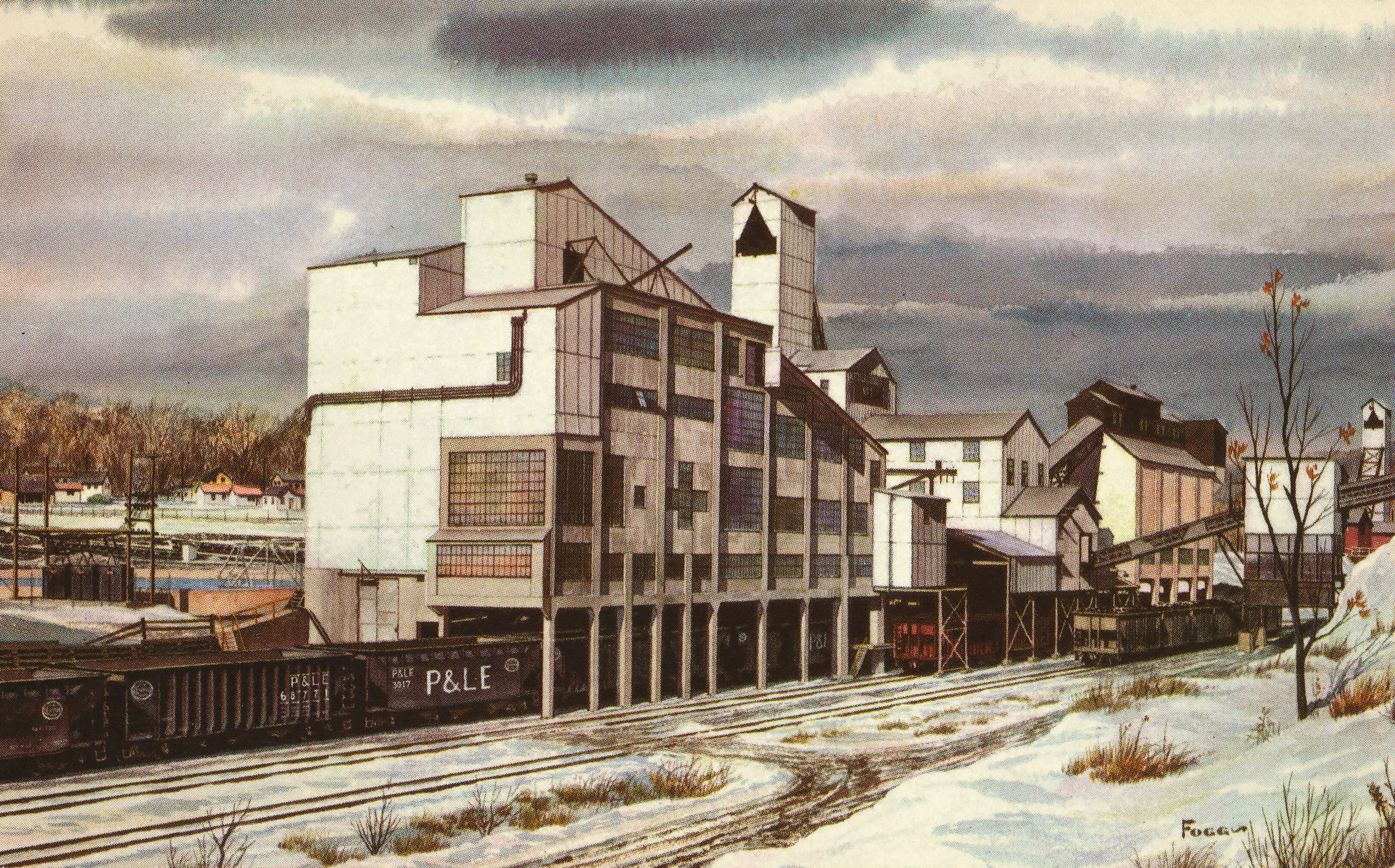
- Postcard painting of the Mather Mine in Mather, Morgan Township, Pennsylvania.
- Date: May 19, 1928
- Time: 4:07 PM
- Location: Mather, Pennsylvania; 39.9348°N 80.0737°W
- Cause: Gas and dust explosion
- Deaths: 195

The Mather Mine disaster refers to the events surrounding an explosion that occurred in the Mather Mine on May 19, 1928, at 4:07 PM in Mather, Pennsylvania. A report released by the United States Bureau of Mines states that a total of 195 men were killed in the catastrophe, of which two died in hospitals after being discovered by rescue crews and volunteers. The Mather Mine disaster ranks as the seventh worst mining disaster in U.S. history and the second worst in Pennsylvania history.

== Mather mine ==
The Mather Mine was a shaft mine owned and operated by Pickands-Mather and Company from 1917 to 1965. Prior to the disaster the mine employed approximately 750 miners working an average of 300 days per year and had an output of approximately 1,000,000 tons of coking coal per year. Officials had described the working conditions of the mine as normal with no prior accidents having been reported.

== Events ==
The explosion occurred as the mine was transitioning from day shift to night shift. Most of the day shift workers had already exited the mine, while most of the night shift workers had just reached their work areas in the northwest section. The assistant to the mine boss, Tom Callaghan, was among a group of sixteen men who had worked together to erect a cloth brattice approximately 500 ft from the flame zone. Within a few minutes of the explosion, Callaghan had managed to telephone the mine house on the surface.

In the early hours of the crises that ensued, volunteers from nearby coal mines in Greene, Fayette, and Washington counties rushed to Mather to provide aid, as did trained rescue crews from the U.S. Department of Mines in Pittsburgh. It was quickly discovered, however, that the extent of the devastation was far-reaching, and many in the small mining community began to lose hope when it was reported on the night of May 20 that the bodies of Callaghan and his men had been brought to the surface.

== Aftermath ==
Subsequent investigations as well as reports from survivors suggest that the incident was the result of a methane gas and dust explosion that was triggered by an arc from a battery-powered locomotive being operated in the affected area. A total of 279 men were estimated to have been underground at the time, 209 of whom were in the affected area when the gas-dust mixture ignited. Of those 209, 193 died in the explosion or were suffocated by afterdamp, 2 died in hospitals after being rescued, and 14 escaped to safety.
