= South Fork Tenmile Creek (Pennsylvania) =

Stream in Pennsylvania, USA

South Fork Tenmile Creek Tributary to Tenmile Creek
- Location of South Fork Tenmile Creek mouth South Fork Tenmile Creek (Pennsylvania) (the United States)

Location
- Country: United States
- State: Pennsylvania
- County: Greene
- Borough: Waynesburg; Clarksville; Jefferson

Physical characteristics
- Source: confluence of Claylick Run and Grays Run
  - location: Rutan, Pennsylvania
  - coordinates: 39°53′42″N 080°20′27″W
  - elevation: 1,023 ft (312 m)
- Mouth: Tenmile Creek
  - location: Clarksville, Pennsylvania
  - coordinates: 39°58′27″N 080°02′23″W
  - elevation: 768 ft (234 m)
- Length: 32.10 mi (51.66 km)
- Basin size: 198.68 square miles (514.6 km^{2})
- Discharge
  - location: Tenmile Creek
  - average: 231.50 cu ft/s (6.555 m^{3}/s) at mouth with Tenmile Creek

Basin features
- Progression: generally east
- River system: Monongahela River
- Tributaries
  - left: Grays Run, Morris Run, Scott Run, West Run, Lightner Run, Rush Run, Clear Run, Throckmorton Run, Browns Creek, Toll Gate Run, Grimes Run, Ruff Creek, Browns Run, Castile Run
  - right: Claylick Run, Hargus Creek, Pursley Creek, Smith Creek, Sugar Run, Laurel Run, Coal Lick Run
- Bridges: Oak Road, Butternut Hollow Road, Covered Bridge Road, Tower Road, PA 21 (x2), PA 18 (x5), Oak Forest Road, Preachers Road, PA 18 (x2), S Morgan Street, US 19, PA 188, I-79, PA 188 (x2), Prison Road, Manning Bridge Road, Crayne School Road, Jefferson Road, Chartiers Road, Pollocks Mill Road, Castile Run Road, Burson Street, Center Street

South Fork Tenmile Creek is a 32.10 mi (51.66 km) long 5th order tributary to Tenmile Creek in Greene County, Pennsylvania.

== Variant names ==
According to the Geographic Names Information System, it has also been known historically as:

- Ten Mile Creek
- Tenmile Creek

== Course ==
South Fork Tenmile Creek is formed at the confluence of Claylick Run and Grays Run in Rutan, Pennsylvania, and then flows easterly to join Tenmile Creek at Clarksville.

== Watershed ==
South Fork Tenmile Creek drains 198.68 square miles (514.6 km^{2}) of area, receives about 41.1 in/year of precipitation, has a wetness index of 298.56 and is about 68% forested.

== See also ==
- List of rivers of Pennsylvania
