= Lippincott Covered Bridge =

- U.S. National Register of Historic Places
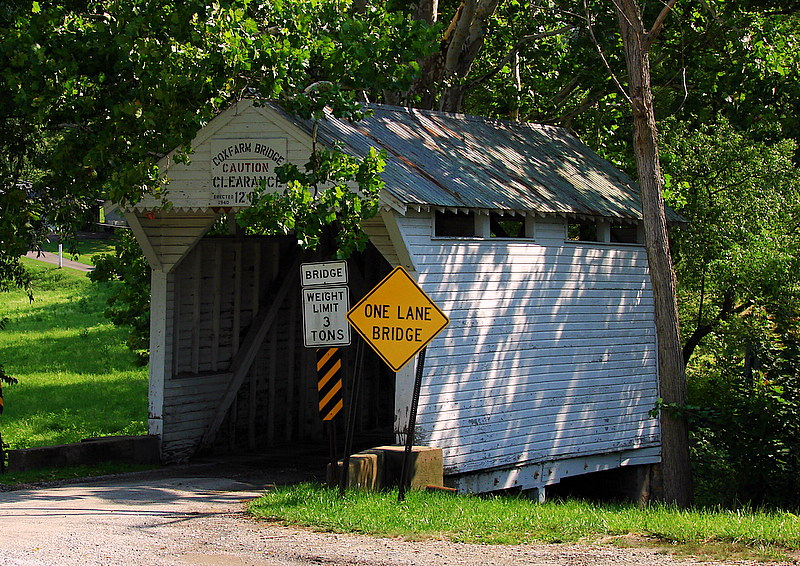
- The bridge in July 2007

- Location within Pennsylvania Location within the United States
- Location: Off Pennsylvania Route 221 at the crossing of Ruff Creek, northeast of Waynesburg, Morgan Township, Pennsylvania
- Coordinates: 39°56′36″N 80°7′35″W
- Area: 0.1 acres (0.040 ha)
- Architectural style: Kingpost truss
- MPS: Covered Bridges of Washington and Greene Counties TR
- NRHP reference No.: 79003823
- Added to NRHP: June 22, 1979

The Lippincott Covered Bridge (also known as the Cox Farm Covered Bridge) is an historic wooden covered bridge in Morgan Township in Greene County, Pennsylvania, United States.

It was listed on the National Register of Historic Places in 1979.

== History and architectural features ==
This historic structure is a 27.75-foot-long (8.46 m), King post, truss bridge with a shingle covered gable roof. Erected in 1943, it crosses Ruff Creek. As of October 1978, it was one of nine historic covered bridges in Greene County.
