= Île Greenly Lighthouse =

Lighthouse on Greenly Island, Canada

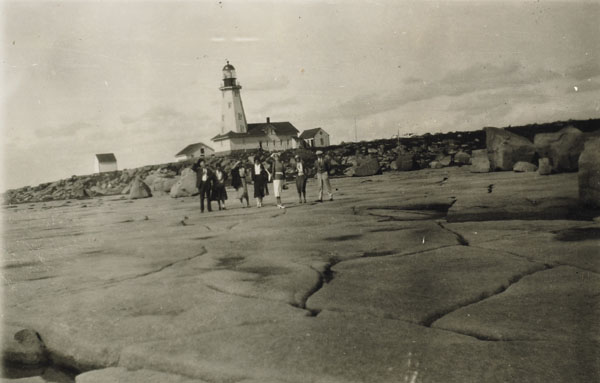
- Île Greenly Lighthouse
- Location: Greenly Island, Quebec, Canada
- Coordinates: 51°22′29″N 57°11′26″W

Tower
- Construction: Wood, Metal
- Automated: August 13, 1878
- Height: 70 ft

Île Greenly Lighthouse is a lighthouse situated on Greenly Island, Canada. It was built in 1875-1878 by James Mowat of Chatham, New Brunswick. In 1948, the lighthouse burned down in a fire.

== History ==
In 1875, Parliament allocated funds for the construction of a lighthouse on Greenly Island. Two years later, a contract for the project was awarded to James Mowat of Chatham, New Brunswick, for the amount of $5,290. The wooden lighthouse, painted fawn, featured a seventy-foot-tall octagonal tower integrated into one end of a rectangular, one-and-a-half-story keeper’s dwelling. Louis Couillard de Beaumont was appointed as the first keeper of Greenly Island, and the light was officially activated on August 13, 1878. In 1948, the lighthouse was destroyed in a fire. In 1983, a metal lighthouse was built to replace the original.
