= Plum Run (Tenmile Creek tributary) =

Stream in Pennsylvania, USA

Plum Run Tributary to Tenmile Creek
- Location of Plum Run mouth Plum Run (Tenmile Creek tributary) (the United States)

Location
- Country: United States
- State: Pennsylvania
- County: Washington

Physical characteristics
- Source: Daniels Run divide
  - location: about 0.5 miles west of Beallsville, Pennsylvania
  - coordinates: 40°04′11″N 080°02′31″W
  - elevation: 1,120 ft (340 m)
- Mouth: Tenmile Creek
  - location: about 0.5 miles southeast of Fairfield, Pennsylvania
  - coordinates: 40°00′30″N 080°03′28″W
  - elevation: 833 ft (254 m)
- Length: 5.37 mi (8.64 km)
- Basin size: 6.93 square miles (17.9 km^{2})
- Discharge
  - location: Tenmile Creek
  - average: 8.41 cu ft/s (0.238 m^{3}/s) at mouth with Tenmile Creek

Basin features
- Progression: generally south
- River system: Monongahela River
- Tributaries
  - left: unnamed tributaries
  - right: unnamed tributaries
- Bridges: Garrett Road (x2), Woodland Lane, Glendon Lane, Laurel Ridge Road, Martindale Road, Hull Road (x2)

Plum Run is a 5.37 mi (8.64 km) long 2nd order tributary to Tenmile Creek in Washington County, Pennsylvania.

== Course ==
Plum Run rises about 0.5 miles west-southwest of Beallsville, Pennsylvania, and then flows south to join Tenmile Creek about 0.5 miles southeast of Fairfield.

== Watershed ==
Plum Run drains 6.93 square miles (17.9 km^{2}) of area, receives about 40.9 in/year of precipitation, has a wetness index of 324.20 and is about 53% forested.

== See also ==
- List of rivers of Pennsylvania
