= March 1928 =

Month of 1928

| << | March 1928 | | | | | >> |
| Su | Mo | Tu | We | Th | Fr | Sa |
| | | | | 1 | 2 | 3 |
| 4 | 5 | 6 | 7 | 8 | 9 | 10 |
| 11 | 12 | 13 | 14 | 15 | 16 | 17 |
| 18 | 19 | 20 | 21 | 22 | 23 | 24 |
| 25 | 26 | 27 | 28 | 29 | 30 | 31 |

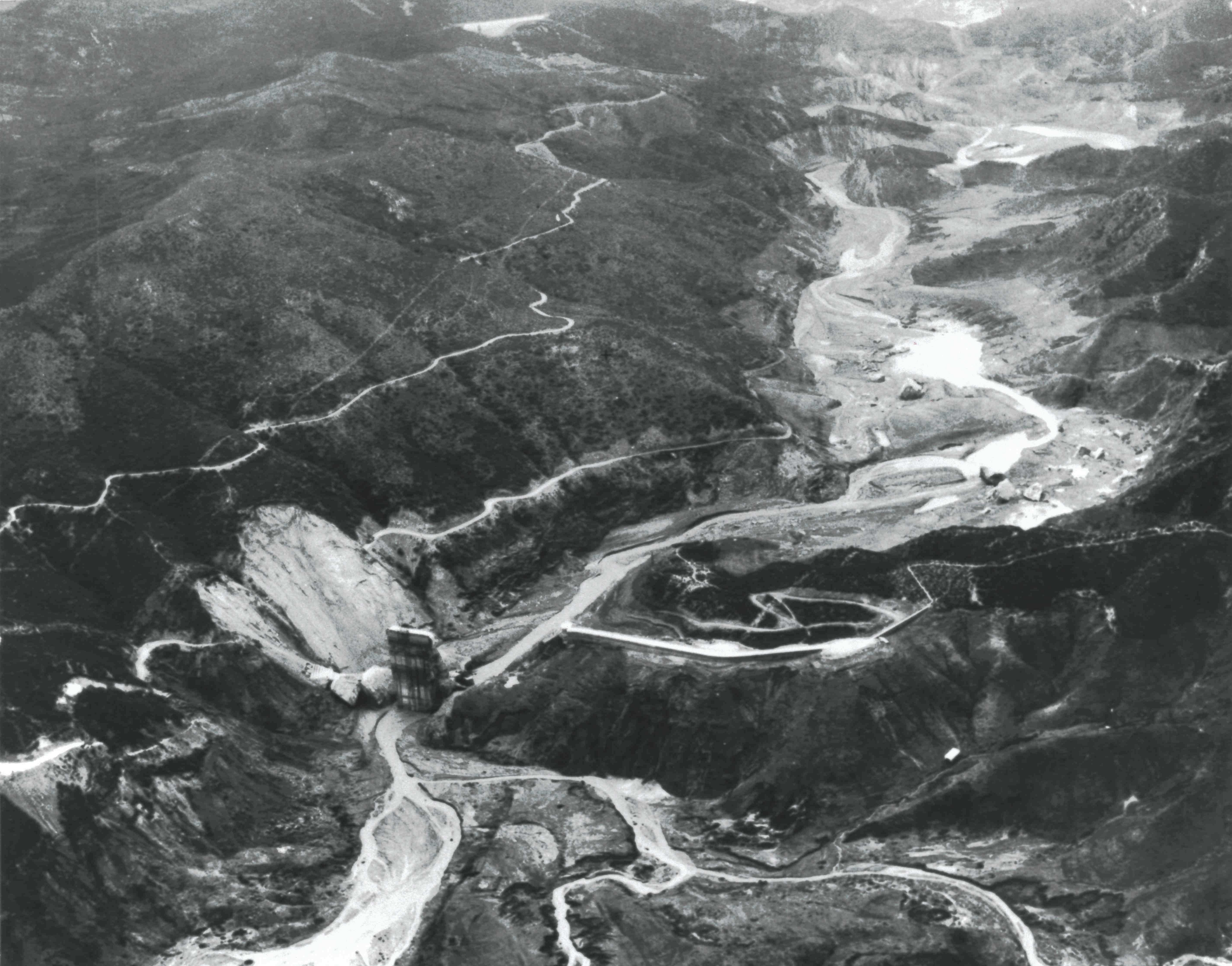
March 12, 1928: Collapse of St. Francis Dam (foreground) in Los Angeles floods San Francisquito Canyon, kills more than 400 people

The following events occurred in March 1928:

== Thursday, March 1, 1928 ==
- The French Chamber of Deputies abolished the drumhead court-martial but approved a new article in the military code stating that "any soldier committing an outrage against the flag or army may be punished by six months to five years in prison, or may be punished by loss of his rank." Communist deputy Alexandre Piquemal nearly incited a riot protesting the death penalty for anyone calling on soldiers to desert to the enemy in time of war when he stated, "We would all come in that category, we Communist deputies. We declare for the proletariat. They have one enemy, capitalism, and one fatherland, Soviet Russia. If you declare war on Russia we will urge the soldiers of the proletariat to desert to the Russian army."
- The Paramount Theatre opened in Seattle.

== Friday, March 2, 1928 ==
- Benito Mussolini submitted a bill to the Chamber of Deputies that would remould Italian parliament into a strictly consultative body.
- Born: Barbara Lang, American actress and singer, in Hollywood, California (d. 1982)
- Died: William Sloan, 60, Canadian businessman and politician

== Saturday, March 3, 1928 ==
- France and Spain reached an agreement on the government of the Tangier International Zone giving Spain increased power.
- Benito Mussolini made a speech to the Chamber of Deputies warning Austria that actions and not words would be his next reply to criticism of the Italianization of South Tyrol.
- The circus comedy film Tillie's Punctured Romance starring W. C. Fields was released.
- The organizers of the Miss America pageant voted 27–3 to discontinue the competition due to pressure from women's groups and church officials. It would not be held again until 1933.
- Born: Gudrun Pausewang, German children's book writer; in Mladkov (d. 2020)
- Died: Jan Toorop, 69, Dutch-Indonesian painter

== Sunday, March 4, 1928 ==
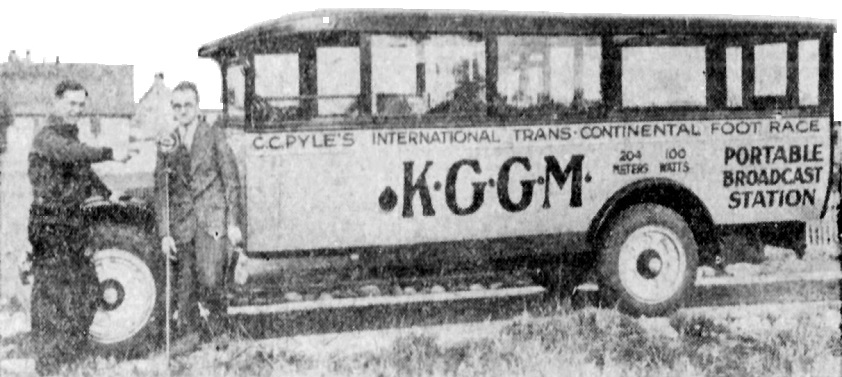
The media bus for the Trans-American Footrace

- The first "Trans-American Footrace", nicknamed the "Bunion Derby", began in Los Angeles with 199 entrants competing to run 3,523.5 miles (5,670.5 km) by foot to New York City, with a $25,000 prize for the winner. Most of the entrants dropped out in the first few days, but 55 runners would go the distance, with Andy Payne finishing first.
- Parliamentary elections were held in Poland, the first since Józef Piłsudski's May Coup of 1926. The Nonpartisan Bloc for Cooperation with the Government led by Walery Sławek won 125 of the 444 seats in the Sejm. Piłsudski would step aside in favor of a civilian prime minister, Kazimierz Bartel, on June 27.
- Born:
  - Samuel Adler, German-born American composer and conductor; in Mannheim
  - Patrick Moore, astronomer, in Pinner, England (d. 2012)
  - Piero D'Inzeo, Olympic show jumping rider, in Rome (d. 2014)
  - Alan Sillitoe, writer, in Nottingham, England (d. 2010)

== Monday, March 5, 1928 ==
- A circuit court of appeals in New York reversed an earlier decision and ruled that Canadians may work in the United States without immigration visas.
- The John Ford-directed silent film Mother Machree premiered at the Globe Theatre in New York City.

== Tuesday, March 6, 1928 ==
- The Vatican announced that annulments of marriages between Catholics and non-Catholics would hereafter be considered by a committee of cardinals instead of the Rota Tribunal.
- Sonja Henie of Norway won the ladies' competition of the World Figure Skating Championships in London.

== Wednesday, March 7, 1928 ==
- The Cross of Merit for Bravery was introduced in Poland.
- Born: Bob Boyd, American football player, in Riverside, California (d. 2009)
- Died: Robert Abbe, 76, American surgeon and radiologist; William Henry Crane, 82, American actor

== Thursday, March 8, 1928 ==
- Vasil Zacharka became the second president-in-exile of the Belarusian People's Republic upon the death of Pyotra Krecheuski.
- Rioting broke out in Tanta, Egypt, when students assembled in the public square to protest against a proposed agreement to a treaty between Egypt and Great Britain. After stones were thrown at foreign shops, police tried to disperse the crowd, which the protestors resisted.
- Died:
  - Pyotra Krecheuski, 48, Belarusian statesman who led a government in exile from Prague
  - Sachiko, Princess Hisa, 5 months, second daughter of Emperor Hirohito and Empress Kōjun

== Friday, March 9, 1928 ==
- The steamboat Robert E. Lee ran aground on the Mary Ann Rocks off Manomet Point in Plymouth, Massachusetts, during a storm.
- The Norris resolution (named for Senator George W. Norris) proposing a constitutional amendment to end "lame duck" sessions of Congress fell 36 votes short of the two-thirds majority it required for its passage. The proposed amendment also would have moved presidential inauguration day up from March 4 to January 4.
- Born: Gerald Bull, Canadian engineer; in North Bay, Ontario (d. 1990)

== Saturday, March 10, 1928 ==
- A landslide at Santos, São Paulo, Brazil killed at least 130 people.
- Walter Collins, the son of Christine Collins, disappeared in Los Angeles.
- The silent film The Legion of the Condemned, starring Fay Wray and Gary Cooper, was released.
- Born:
  - James Earl Ray, American criminal and convicted assassin of Martin Luther King Jr., in Alton, Illinois (d. 1998)
  - Kiyoshi Atsumi, Japanese film actor; in Tokyo (d. 1996)

== Sunday, March 11, 1928 ==
- Benito Mussolini proposed a national bank program to aid newly-married couples. Young Italians wanting to get married could receive a loan until they got on their feet financially, and then they could reimburse the state in two or three years.

== Monday, March 12, 1928 ==
The remains of the Dam

- Shortly before midnight, the St. Francis Dam in Los Angeles collapsed and released 12 billion gallons (45.4 billion liters) of water, killing more than 400 people.
- A new one-day record was set on Wall Street when 3,909,100 shares changed hands.
- Born:
  - Edward Albee, American playwright, in Virginia before growing up in Larchmont, New York (d. 2016)
  - Aldemaro Romero, Venezuelan pianist, in Valencia (d. 2007)

== Tuesday, March 13, 1928 ==
- The water released from the collapse of the St. Francis Dam reached the Pacific Ocean after having killed 500 people.
- The Nicaraguan lower house defeated a bill that would have provided for American supervision of Nicaraguan elections.

== Wednesday, March 14, 1928 ==
- The partly talking film Tenderloin, starring Dolores Costello, premiered at the Warner Theatre in Washington, D.C.
- The Emir of Afghanistan Amānullāh Khān and his wife Soraya Tarzi rode in a royal procession through London.
- Born: Frank Borman, American astronaut and commander of the Apollo 8 mission that was the first to go beyond Earth's orbit; later Chairman of Eastern Air Lines; in Gary, Indiana (d. 2023)

== Thursday, March 15, 1928 ==
- The March 15 incident (San ichi-go jiken) occurred in Japan when the government cracked down on socialists and communists, making about 500 arrests.
- U.S. President Calvin Coolidge rejected a request from Puerto Rican legislators for autonomous rule. Coolidge wrote that it was not unreasonable "to suggest that the people of Porto Rico, who are part of the people of the United States, will progress with the people of the United States rather than become isolated from the source from which they have received practically their only hope of progress."

== Friday, March 16, 1928 ==
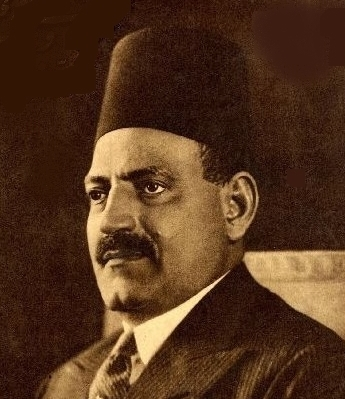
Premier Nahas

- Mustafa el-Nahhas became the new Prime Minister of Egypt for the first of five occasions between 1928 and 1952.
- A controversy in the Royal Navy dubbed the "Royal Oak Mutiny" hit the media. An admiral and two officers were suspended over a quarrel that began the previous week when Rear-Admiral Bernard Collard objected to the presence of a jazz band at a party aboard HMS Royal Oak.
- Born:
  - Wakanohana Kanji I, Japanese sumo wrestler and yokozuna; in Hirosaki (d. 2010)
  - Christa Ludwig, German mezzo-soprano; in Berlin (d. 2021)
  - Victor Maddern, British actor, in Seven Kings, Ilford, Essex (d. 1993)

== Saturday, March 17, 1928 ==
- The Brazilian football club Clube Ferroviário do Recife was founded.
- Born: Eunice Gayson, English actress, in Croydon, Surrey (d. 2018)
- Died: Lorenzo Porciatti, 63, Italian architect

== Sunday, March 18, 1928 ==
- In Romania, 60,000 peasants staged a protest in Bucharest calling on Vintilă Brătianu to resign.
- American Roman Catholic Cardinal George Mundelein told journalists in Rome that the Vatican had no interest in the presidential campaign of Catholic candidate Al Smith. "The Catholic church in America contends with no oppressive legislation, has no political ax to grind and lives and thrives under the existing form of government", he said. "Therefore there is no reason whatever for it to take a partisan stand."
- Born: Fidel V. Ramos, 12th President of the Philippines (1992 to 1998); in Lingayen (d. 2022)

== Monday, March 19, 1928 ==
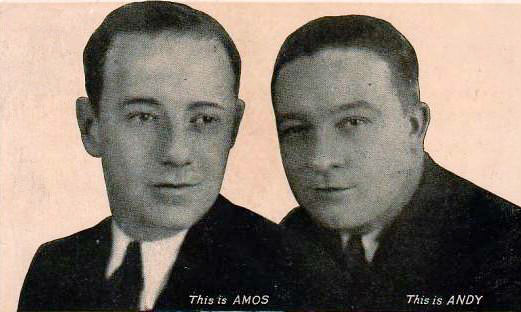
Gosden and Correll, "Amos and Andy"

- The popular radio comedy show Amos 'n' Andy, with white comedians Freeman Gosden and Charles Correll mimicking African Americans in the style of a minstrel show, first aired, originally as a local program on WMAQ in Chicago.
- "My Old Kentucky Home" became the official state song of Kentucky.
- Born:
  - Hans Küng, Swiss Catholic priest, theologian and author, in Sursee (d. 2021)
  - Patrick McGoohan, American-born Irish-British actor, in Astoria, Queens, New York City (d. 2009)
- Died: Nora Bayes, 47, American singer, comedian and actress

== Tuesday, March 20, 1928 ==
- The silent drama film The Trail of '98, starring Harry Carey, premiered at the Astor Theatre.
- Born: Fred Rogers, Presbyterian minister and television host (Mister Rogers' Neighborhood), in Latrobe, Pennsylvania (d. 2003)

== Wednesday, March 21, 1928 ==
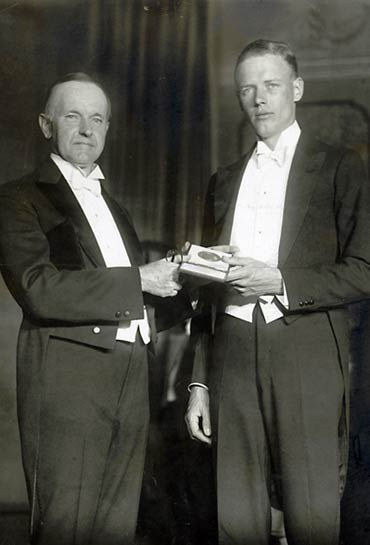
Coolidge and Lindbergh

- U.S. President Calvin Coolidge presented Charles Lindbergh with the Congressional Medal of Honor.
- Died:
  - Joe Espositi, 55, Chicago Alderman for the 19th Ward, as well as a bootlegger in organized crime, was killed in a drive-by shooting by members of a rival gang.
  - General Zhang Shaozeng, 49, Chinese military leader who briefly served as the Premier of the Republic of China, was assassinated.

== Thursday, March 22, 1928 ==
- The Noël Coward revue This Year of Grace premiered at the London Pavilion.
- The Fritz Lang-directed film Spione (Spies) was released.
- The Muslim Brotherhood is founded.
- Born: Ed Macauley, American basketball player, in St. Louis (d. 2011)

== Friday, March 23, 1928 ==
- The silent film The Road to Ruin was released.
- Born: Jim Lemon, American baseball player and coach, in Covington, Virginia (d. 2006)

== Saturday, March 24, 1928 ==
- A band of Mexican bandits held up 15 automobiles and methodically robbed 200 people outside of Mexico City.
- Born: Byron Janis, American classical pianist, in McKeesport, Pennsylvania (d. 2024)

== Sunday, March 25, 1928 ==
- At a rally in Rome, 80,000 Italian youths were initiated into the National Fascist Party during commemorations of the ninth anniversary of the founding of the Fasci Italiani di Combattimento.
- Pope Pius XI made an address protesting "the constant monopoly of the education of youth, both moral and spiritual", by the state. "We have kept silent in order not to make the situation worse, but our silence has been misinterpreted", the pope said.
- Born: Jim Lovell, American astronaut on Apollo 8 and Apollo 13, and two Gemini program missions, co-author of the book Lost Moon; in Cleveland (d. 2025)

== Monday, March 26, 1928 ==
- Bombs thrown at the home of Illinois Senator Charles S. Deneen caused extensive damage, but Deneen was unhurt. It was one of several acts of violence leading up to the April 10 elections that led them to be dubbed the "Pineapple Primary", as "pineapple" was a popular nickname for a grenade-style bomb favored by gangsters of the time.
- Born: Bobby Thomason, American football player, in Albertville, Alabama (d. 2013)

== Tuesday, March 27, 1928 ==
- The Liberty Bridge opened in Pittsburgh, Pennsylvania.
- Born: Antonín Tučapský, Czech classical music composer, in Opatovice, Czechoslovakia (d. 2014)
- Died: Leslie Stuart, 65, English theatrical composer known for Florodora

== Wednesday, March 28, 1928 ==
- Former Australian Prime Minister Billy Hughes made a speech at a conference of the Nationalist Party blaming Benito Mussolini for the immigration of large numbers of Italians. "To whom does Australia belong – ourselves or Premier Mussolini? Apparently all Premier Mussolini has to do is rattle his sword in the scabbard and we must allow unlimited numbers of Italians to enter the country", Hughes said.
- Oxford won the 80th Boat Race.
- Born:
  - Zbigniew Brzezinski, Polish-born American statesman and U.S. National Security Advisor 1977-1981; in Warsaw (d. 2017)
  - Alexander Grothendieck, German-born French mathematician, in Berlin (d. 2014)

== Thursday, March 29, 1928 ==
- The so-called "Flapper Vote Bill" passed its second reading in the British House of Commons. The bill would create over 5 million new women voters as young as twenty-one.
- Born: Vincent Gigante, American mobster; in Manhattan (d. 2005)

== Friday, March 30, 1928 ==
- Italian pilot Mario de Bernardi set a new air speed record of 336.6 miles per hour, smashing his own record.
- Italy passed a new decree suppressing all organizations promoting the spiritual, moral or physical education of children. The law was aimed squarely at Catholic children's organizations.
- Tipperary Tim won the Grand National horse race.
- Died: Frank B. Willis, 56, U.S. Senator and 47th Governor of Ohio

== Saturday, March 31, 1928 ==
- An earthquake in Smyrna killed sixty people.
- Born:
  - Gordie Howe, Canadian ice hockey player and inductee of the Hockey Hall of Fame; in Floral, Saskatchewan (d. 2016)
  - Lefty Frizzell, influential American country music singer and inductee into the Country Music Hall of Fame, in Corsicana, Texas (d. 1975)
- Died: Gustave Ador, 82, President of the Swiss Confederation in 1919
