= Castile Run =

River in Pennsylvania, United States

Castile Run Tributary to South Fork Tenmile Creek
- Location of Castile Run mouth Castile Run (the United States)

Location
- Country: United States of America
- State: Pennsylvania
- County: Greene
- Township: Morgan

Physical characteristics
- Source: divide between Castile Run and Tenmile Creek (Barrs Run)
  - location: Castile, Pennsylvania
  - coordinates: 39°59′25″N 080°07′02″W
  - elevation: 1,200 ft (370 m)
- Mouth: South Fork Tenmile Creek
  - location: Chartiers, Pennsylvania
  - coordinates: 39°57′44″N 080°03′21″W
  - elevation: 810 ft (250 m)
- Length: 5.21 mi (8.38 km)
- Basin size: 6.19 square miles (16.0 km^{2})
- Discharge
  - average: 7.61 cu ft/s (0.215 m^{3}/s) at mouth with South Fork Tenmile Creek

Basin features
- Progression: southeast
- River system: Monongahela River
- Tributaries
  - left: Bacon Run
  - right: unnamed tributaries

Castile Run is a small tributary to South Fork Tenmile Creek in southwestern Pennsylvania. The stream rises in northeastern Greene County and flows southeast entering South Fork Tenmile Creek at Chartiers, Pennsylvania. The watershed is roughly 25% agricultural, 69% forested and the rest is other uses.

== Course ==
Castile Run rises at Castile, Pennsylvania, and then flows southeast to join South Fork Tenmile Creek at Chartiers.

== Watershed ==
Castile Run drains 6.19 square miles (16.0 km^{2}) of area, receives about 40.6 in/year of precipitation, has a wetness index of 306.97 and is about 69% forested.

== See also ==
- List of rivers of Pennsylvania
