= February 1928 =

Month of 1928

<<	February 1928					>>
Su	Mo	Tu	We	Th	Fr	Sa
			1	2	3	4
5	6	7	8	9	10	11
12	13	14	15	16	17	18
19	20	21	22	23	24	25
26	27	28	29

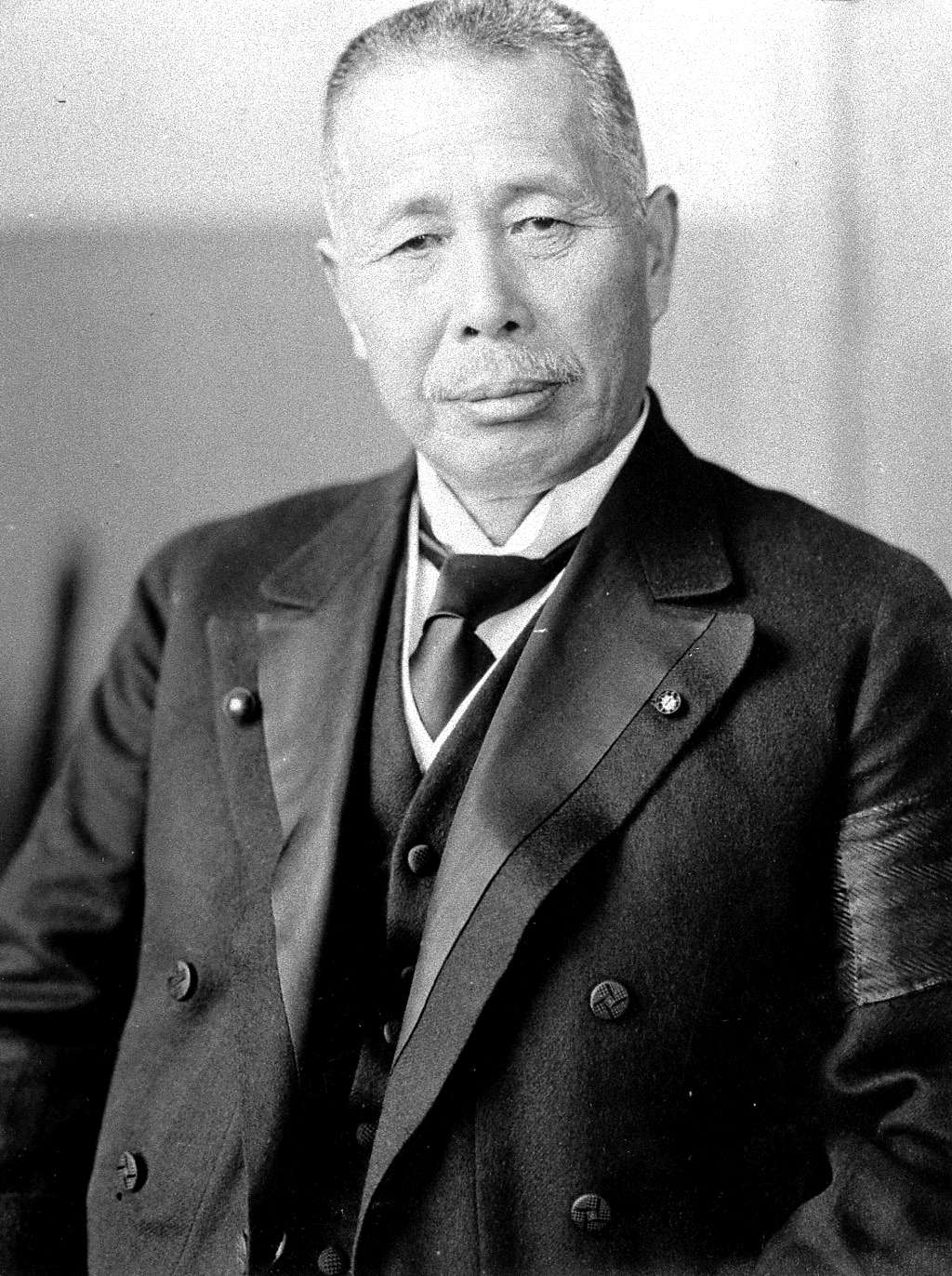
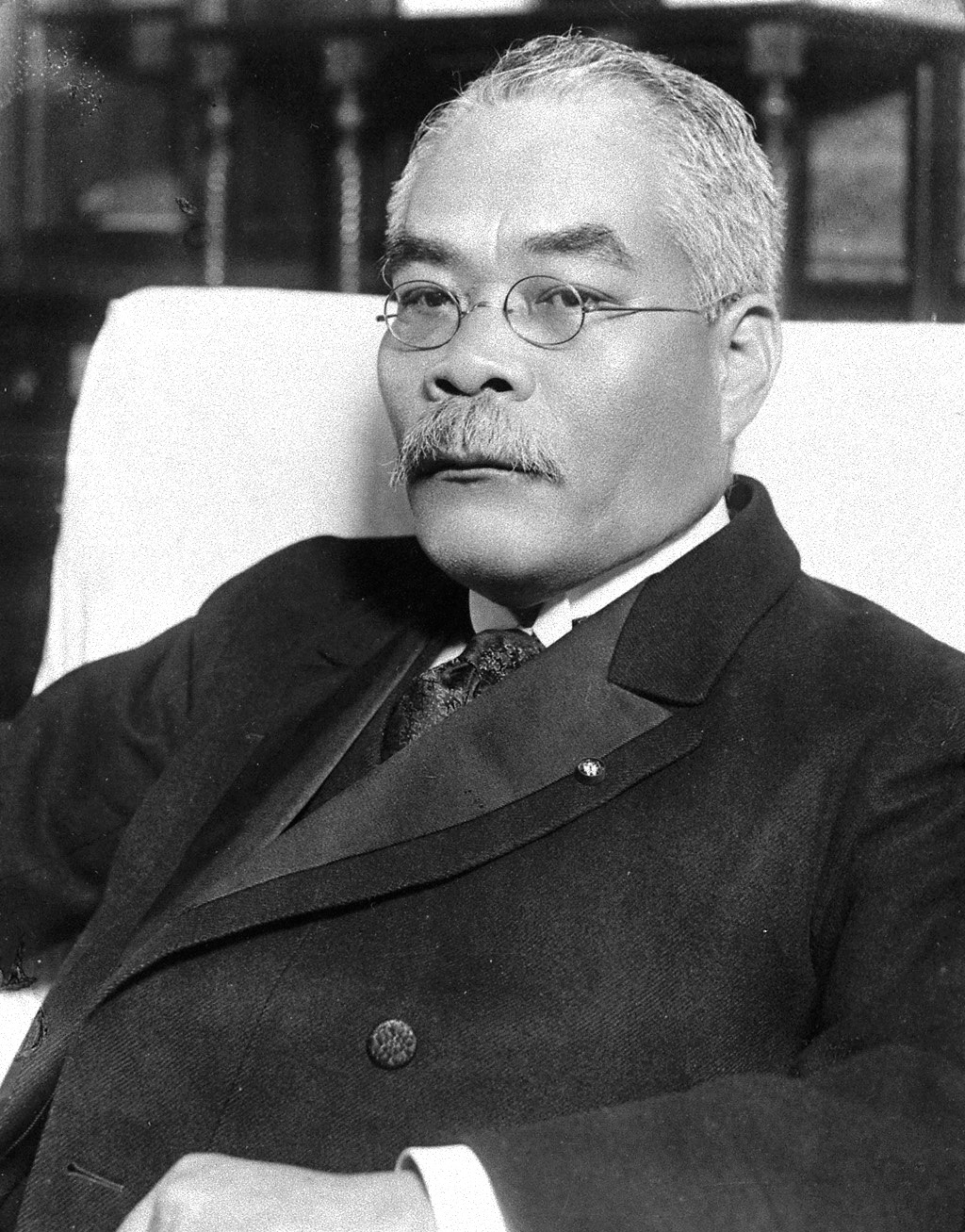
February 20, 1928: Japanese election gives Premier Tanaka's and party 217 to 216 lead over challenger Hamaguchi

The following events occurred in February 1928:

== Wednesday, February 1, 1928 ==
- A significant discovery of Tutankhamun's tomb was made in the "annex": the canopic jars containing the pharaoh's organs.
- Boxing promoter Tex Rickard said that Jack Dempsey was retiring from the ring.
- Born:
  - Tom Lantos, Hungarian-born American politician, in Budapest (d. 2008)
  - Stuart Whitman, American film and TV actor; in San Francisco (d. 2020)
- Died: Hughie Jennings, 58, American baseball player and manager

== Thursday, February 2, 1928 ==
- The Great Fall River fire broke out in Fall River, Massachusetts, destroying much of the town.
- Charles Lindbergh flew to San Juan, Puerto Rico, and landed to a 20-gun salute.

== Friday, February 3, 1928 ==
- The Simon Commission arrived in Bombay to study constitutional reform in British India. The delegation was immediately met with a hartal and protestors holding black flags and banners reading "Simon Go Back".
- Born: Frankie Vaughan, English singer; in Liverpool (d. 1999)

== Saturday, February 4, 1928 ==
- Charles Lindbergh flew to Santo Domingo, Dominican Republic, on his twenty-sixth birthday where he was given the key to the city before attending a reception by President Horacio Vásquez.
- Communists in Berlin stormed a movie theatre showing the American war film The Big Parade where they tore up the screen and tried to burn the film.
- The silent film The Garden of Eden starring Corinne Griffith was released.
- Born: Kim Yong-nam, former North Korean Foreign Minister, 1983 to 1998, Chairman of the Presidium, 1998 to 2019; in Heijo, Japanese Korea (now Pyongyang) (d. 2025)
- Died:
  - Hendrik Lorentz, 74, Dutch physicist and Nobel Prize laureate
  - Manche Masemola, 14, South African convert to Christianity, who was murdered by her parents for her faith.

== Sunday, February 5, 1928 ==
- Two hundred were injured and one hundred and twenty-five were arrested in Berlin during fighting between Communists and Der Stahlhelm.
- Fascist Italy opened the Accademia della Farnesina, a school for sport and political education.
- Born:
  - Hristu Cândroveanu, Romanian editor, literary critic and writer (d. 2013)
  - Andrew Greeley, Roman Catholic priest and writer, in Oak Park, Illinois (d. 2013)
  - Don Hoak, baseball player, in Roulette Township, Pennsylvania (d. 1969)

== Monday, February 6, 1928 ==
- Prominent Americans and Frenchmen held a celebration in Paris commemorating the 150th anniversary of the Franco-American Treaty of Alliance of 1778.
- Actress Mae Clark married the dancer and comedian Lew Brice in Chicago.

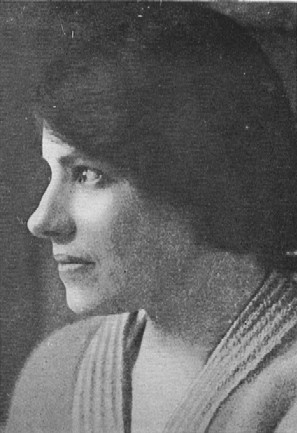
Anderson, alias Anastasia

- Anna Anderson, who claimed to be the former Grand Duchess Anastasia Nikolaevna of Russia, made her first appearance in the United States, arriving in New York City.
- Charles Lindbergh flew to Port-au-Prince, Haiti, and was greeted by President Louis Borno.

== Tuesday, February 7, 1928 ==
- King George V opened a new session of British Parliament.
- The Pan American Institute of Geography and History was created in Havana.
- Born: Al Smith, baseball player, in Kirkwood, Missouri (d. 2002)

== Wednesday, February 8, 1928 ==
- British inventor John Logie Baird broadcast a transatlantic television signal from a transmitter in London to the United States, where it was seen on a receiver located in a laboratory in Hartsdale, New York.
- Charles Lindbergh flew to Cuba and was received at the presidential palace by Gerardo Machado.
- Born: Gene Lees, Canadian music critic and journalist; in Hamilton, Ontario (d. 2010)

== Thursday, February 9, 1928 ==
- A jury in Los Angeles found William Edward Hickman sane and therefore guilty of the murder of 12-year-old Marion Parker.
- Born:
  - Frank Frazetta, American fantasy and science fiction artist, in Brooklyn (d. 2010)
  - Roger Mudd, American broadcast journalist and TV news anchorman; in Washington, D.C. (d. 2021)
  - Rinus Michels, Netherlands footballer, in Amsterdam (d. 2005)
  - Erv Palica, American baseball player, in Lomita, California (d. 1982)

== Friday, February 10, 1928 ==
- A fire broke out in the Hollinger Gold Mine in Timmins, Ontario. Many miners escaped but 39 perished.
- An explosion at the Beacon Oil plant in Everett, Massachusetts killed 14.
- Spain's top division of association football league, La Liga (Liga Española) was officially founded.

== Saturday, February 11, 1928 ==
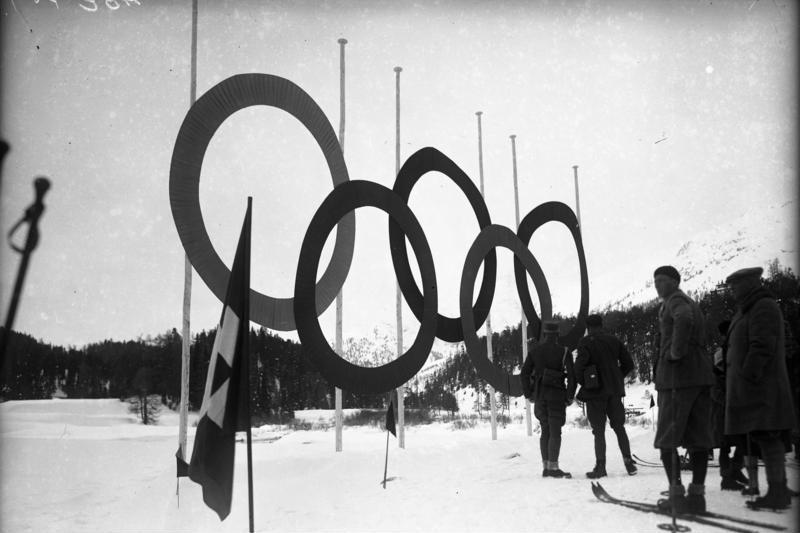
The display at St. Moritz

- The Second Winter Olympic Games opened at St. Moritz in Switzerland.
- The Pittsburgh Pirates and New York Giants swapped their star pitchers; the Pirates got Burleigh Grimes in exchange for Vic Aldridge.

== Sunday, February 12, 1928 ==
- French playwright Pierre Veber challenged author Maurice Rostand to a duel with pistols after Rostand wrote a negative review of Veber's latest play, En Bordée. Rostand declined the challenge.

== Monday, February 13, 1928 ==
- A powder explosion in a mine in Wilder, Tennessee, killed 4 men.

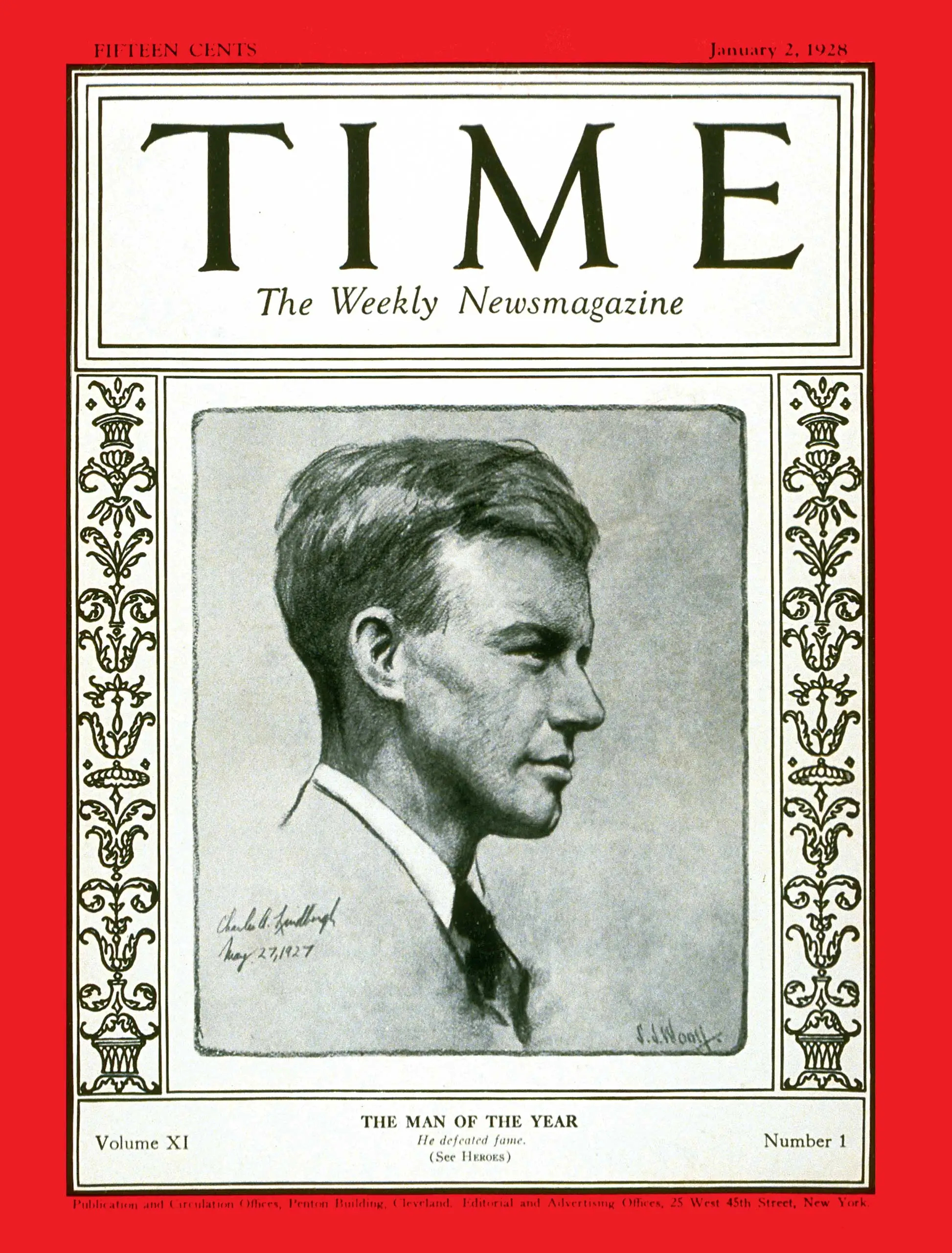
Lindbergh

- Charles Lindbergh landed in St. Louis, ending his two-month, 15-nation goodwill tour.

== Tuesday, February 14, 1928 ==
- The Interborough Rapid Transit Company clashed with city and state authorities in New York over the proposed raising of the subway fare from 5 cents to 7 cents.
- The John Ford-directed silent drama film Four Sons premiered at the Gaiety Theatre in New York City.
- Died: Ernesto Schiaparelli, 71, Italian Egyptologist who had discovered the tomb of Queen Nefertari in 1904

== Wednesday, February 15, 1928 ==
- The New York Supreme Court denied the Interborough Rapid Transit Company an injunction to restrain the American Federation of Labor and the Amalgamated Association of Street and Electric Railway Employees from attempting to organize employees of the company.
- Died: H. H. Asquith, 75, Prime Minister of the United Kingdom 1908–1916

== Thursday, February 16, 1928 ==
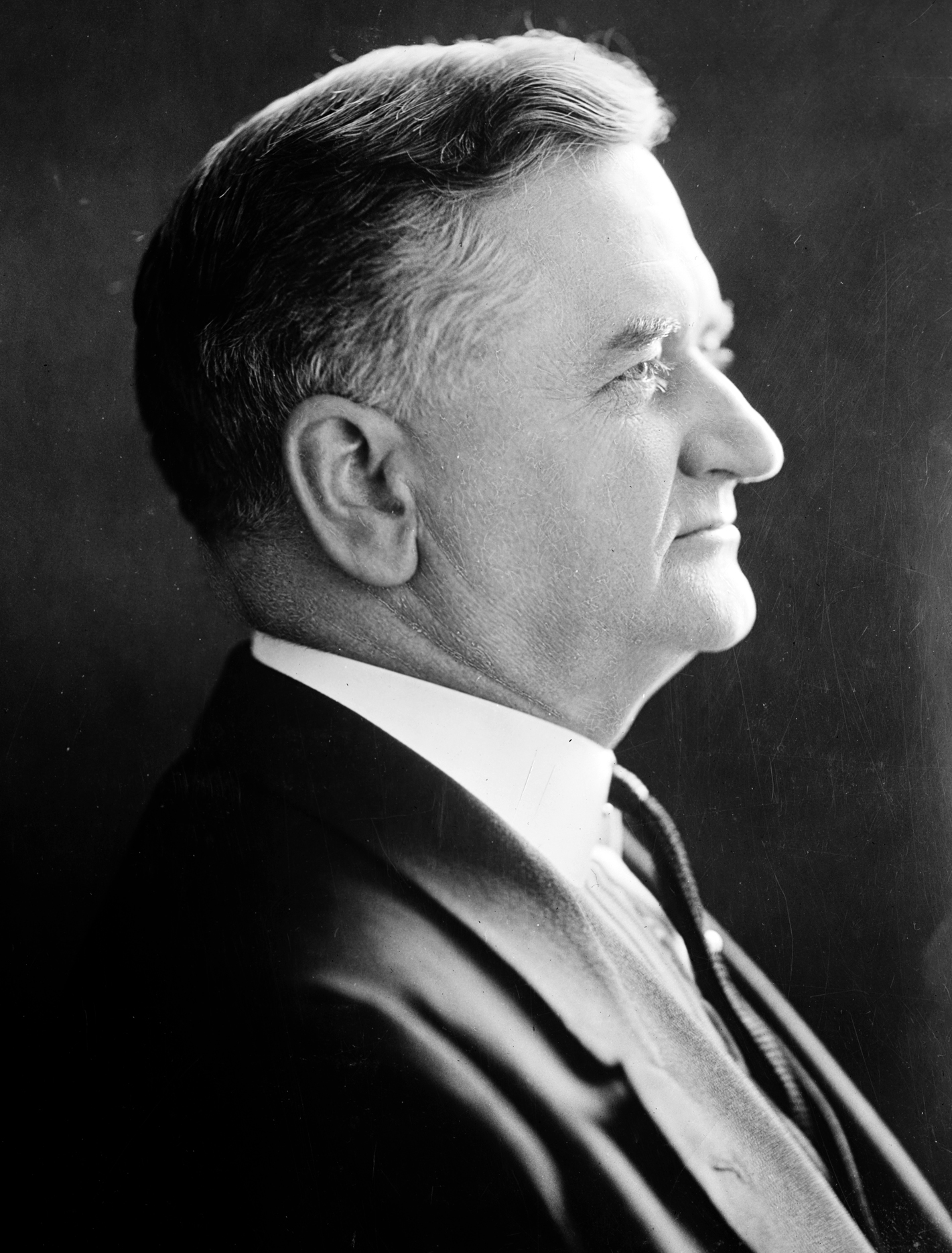
Governor Jackson

- In the U.S., Indiana Governor Edward L. Jackson was found not guilty of trying to bribe Warren T. McCray, the governor at the time, in 1923.
- Canadian Minister of Finance James Robb presented the government's budget for the next year, projecting a surplus of over $45.8 million. The income tax, cut 10 percent last year, was cut an additional 10 percent, and the sales tax was cut from 4 percent to 3 percent.
- Born:
  - Willi Dreesen, Swiss painter and sculptor, in Essen-Werden, Germany (d. 2013)
  - Porfi Jiménez, Dominican-born Venezuelan musician (d. 2010)
- Died:
  - Eddie Foy, Sr., 71, American stage entertainer
  - Reggie Morris, 41, American film actor, director and screenwriter, died from a heart attack

== Friday, February 17, 1928 ==
- The Senate of Virginia passed a bill making lynching a state offense.
- Died: Ōtsuki Fumihiko, 80, Japanese lexicographer, linguist and historian

== Saturday, February 18, 1928 ==
- A light plane crashed in downtown Macon, Georgia. Both pilots were killed when one of the bombs they were tossing out of the plane as part of a carnival exhibition caught in the wings and exploded, causing the plane to plummet 7,000 feet. A third person was killed and two injured as the plane crashed into the street.
- The King Vidor-directed silent film The Crowd premiered at the Capitol Theatre in New York City.
- When the cornerstone of the demolished Eastland County Courthouse was opened in Eastland, Texas, among the memorabilia found in the time capsule was alleged to be a horned lizard hibernating inside for 31 years. Whether the story was true or not, the animal became a celebrity known as Ol' Rip the Horned Toad.
- Born: John Ostrom, paleontologist, in New York City (d. 2005); Tom Johnson, ice hockey player and executive, in Baldur, Manitoba (d. 2007)

== Sunday, February 19, 1928 ==
- The II Winter Olympic Games closed. Norway led the final medal count with 6 gold medals and 15 total.

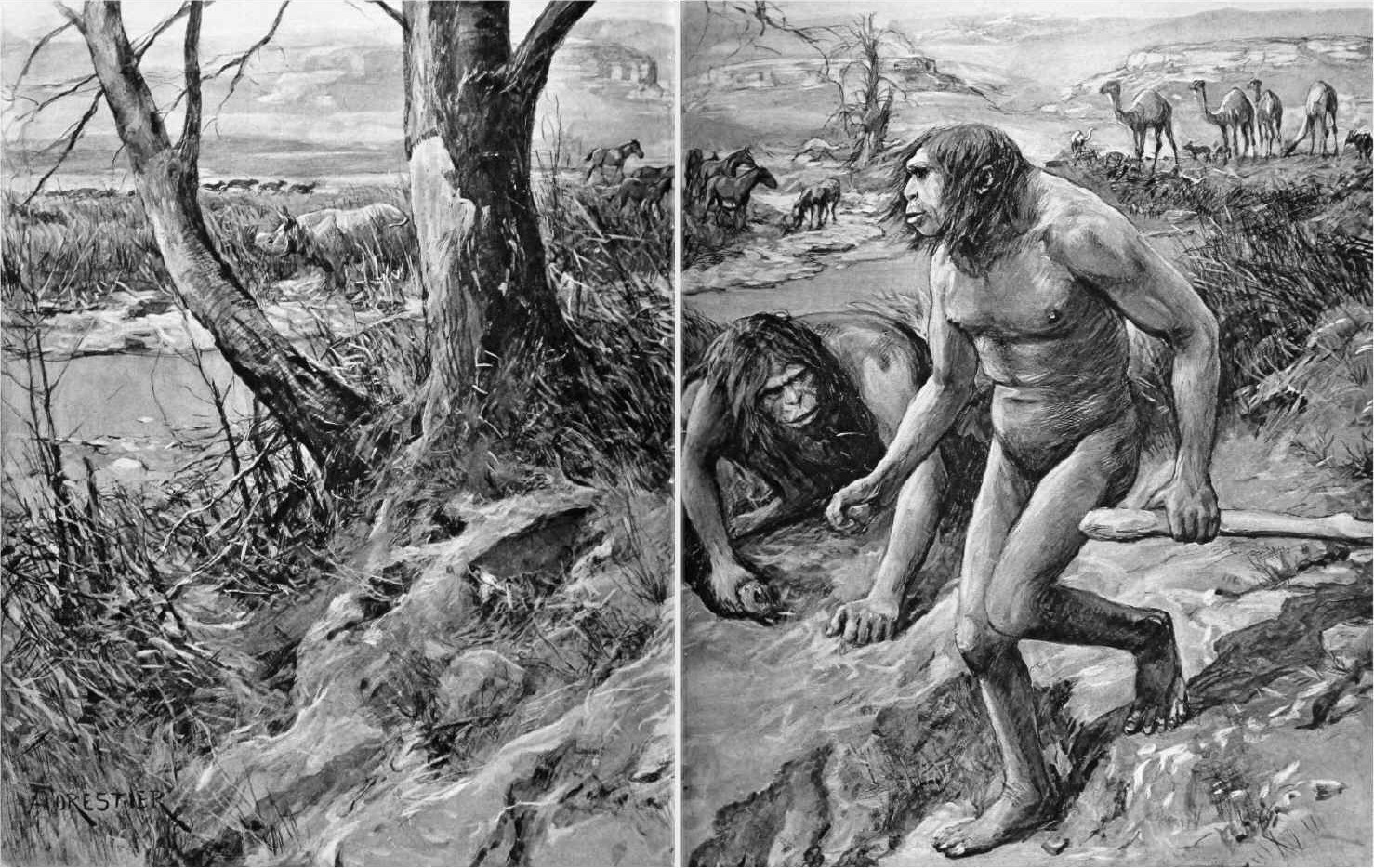
An artist's rendering of "Nebraska Man"

- It was announced that the tooth attributed to the prehistoric primate species Nebraska Man (Hesperopithecus haroldcookii) was positively identified as belonging to an extinct wild pig.
- The Paraguayan Communist Party was founded.

== Monday, February 20, 1928 ==
- Japan held elections for its House of Representatives on a Monday, the first since the General Election Law was passed.
  - The ruling Seiyūkai Party, led by Prime Minister Tanaka Giichi, edged out the Minsei Party, led by Hamaguchi Osachi, by a single seat in the 466 member lower house of parliament, 217 to 216.
- The sixth Pan-American Conference ended.
- The U.S. Supreme Court decided the case of Miller v. Schoene, holding that a government could, without a hearing, exercise its police power over property "by deciding upon the destruction of one class of property in order to save another which, in the judgment of the legislature, is of greater value to the public" without violating the Due Process Clause of the U.S. Constitution.
- Sir Arthur Conan Doyle published a 19-page essay, "A Word of Warning", recommending that Christianity be abandoned and replaced by a new religion based on spiritualism.
- Born: Roy Face, American baseball player and relief pitcher; in Stephentown, New York

== Tuesday, February 21, 1928 ==
- Industrialist Harry Ford Sinclair and three associates were found guilty of criminal contempt of court for jury shadowing in the Teapot Dome scandal trial. Sinclair was sentenced to six months in prison.

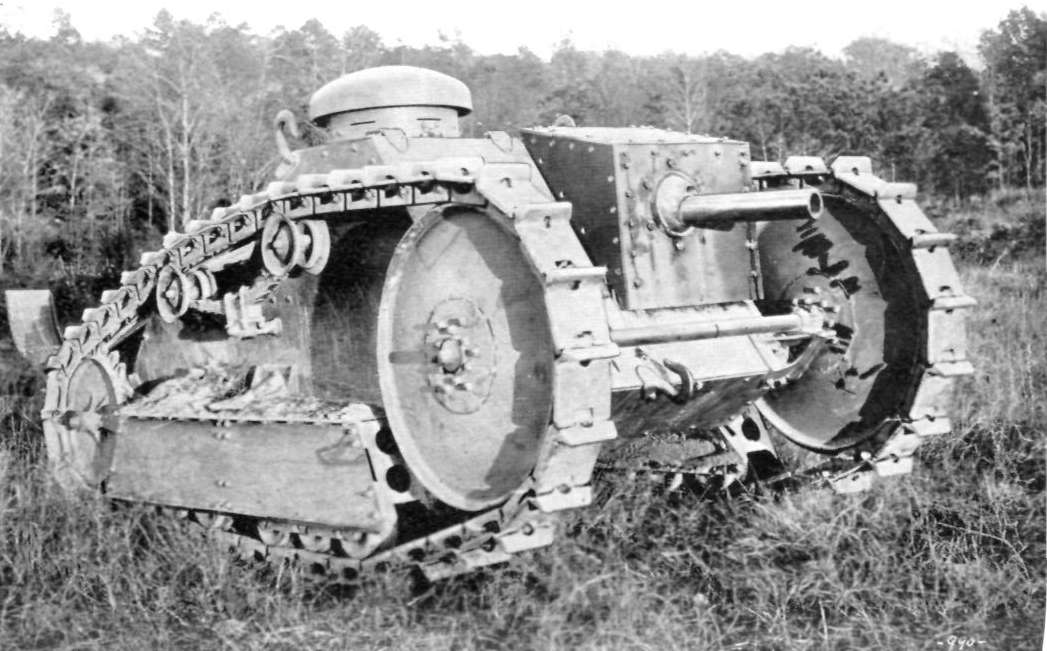
A U.S. M1918 tank

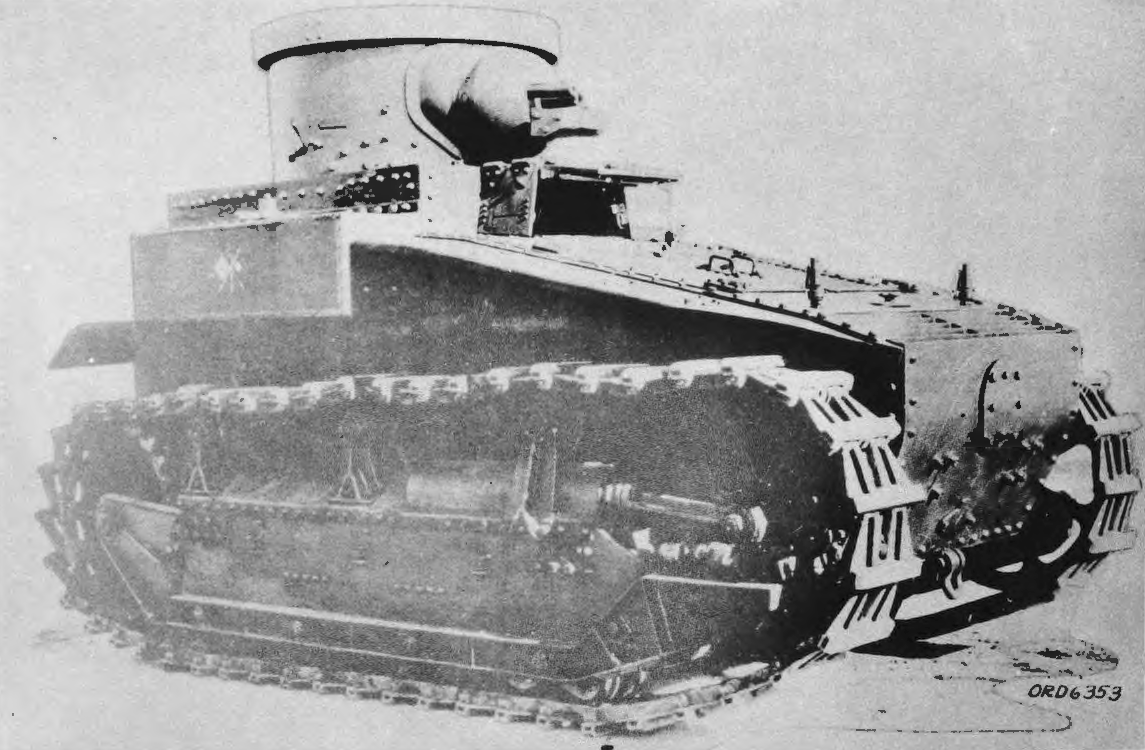
A U.S. 1928 T1 Light Tank

- The United States Department of War announced that tank development in the past several years had made it a far more effective weapon than it was a decade earlier. "The tank of the World War was formerly regarded as an auxiliary of the infantryman", the department said. "Today it has undergone a complete transformation and while it will still, in certain circumstances, continue its role in aiding the doughboy, the future will find it utilized as the nucleus of the army's mechanized units."
- Born: Larry Pennell, American motion picture and television actor, born in Uniontown, Pennsylvania (d. 2013)

== Wednesday, February 22, 1928 ==
- The Emir of Afghanistan Amānullāh Khān and his wife Soraya Tarzi rode in a royal procession through Berlin. Former Crown Prince Wilhelm attempted to join the procession uninvited but the crowd rushed his car and blocked it.
- Born: Bruce Forsyth, British television presenter and entertainer, in Edmonton, London (d. 2017)

== Thursday, February 23, 1928 ==
- Film actress Mary Astor and film director Kenneth Hawks were married, less than two years before his death.
- Hungary scrapped the mysterious shipment of machine guns intercepted on the border with Austria some weeks ago and sold them as junk.
- Born:
  - Ralph Earnhardt, American NASCAR driver, in Kannapolis, North Carolina (died of a heart attack, 1973)
  - Vasily Lazarev, Soviet cosmonaut on Soyuz 12; in Poroshino, Russian SFSR (d. 1990)
  - Galina Savelyeva, Russian gynaecologist, in Kuvaka, Penza Province, USSR (d. 2022)
- Died: MacCallum Grant, 82, Canadian businessman and twelfth Lieutenant Governor of Nova Scotia

== Friday, February 24, 1928 ==
- Hungarian Prime Minister István Bethlen's statement to the League of Nations that Hungary "would not find it possible" to comply with the demand to halt the sale of the machine guns angered League officials.
- Born: Bubba Phillips, baseball player, in West Point, Mississippi (d. 1993)

== Saturday, February 25, 1928 ==
- Benito Mussolini recalled the Italian envoy to Austria after some Austrian government officials criticized Mussolini's Italianization of South Tyrol policy.
- Born: Kim Slavin, painter, in Leningrad, Soviet Union (d. 1991)
- Died: Saint Toribio Romo, 27, Mexican priest and martyr of the Cristero War

== Sunday, February 26, 1928 ==
- Willy Böckl of Austria won the men's competition of the World Figure Skating Championships in Berlin, Germany.
- The silent comedy film A Girl in Every Port starring Victor McLaglen was released.
- Born:
  - Fats Domino (stage name for Antoine Domino Jr.), pianist and singer-songwriter, in New Orleans, Louisiana (d. 2017)
  - Anatoly Filipchenko, Soviet cosmonaut on Soyuz 7 and Soyuz 16; in Davydovka, Russian SFSR (d. 2022)
  - Ariel Sharon, 11th Prime Minister of Israel from 2001 to 2006; in Kfar Malal, British Palestine (d. 2014)

== Monday, February 27, 1928 ==
- The controversial British war film Dawn was discussed on the floor of the House of Commons. Foreign Affairs Secretary Austen Chamberlain had not viewed the film and did not plan to, but objected to a scene depicting Edith Cavell's execution which had reportedly been embellished for dramatic effect. "I believe that account of the execution to be wholly apocryphal, and I hold it is an outrage on a noble woman's memory to turn into melodrama, for the purposes of commercial gain, so heroic a story", Chamberlain said, though he did not propose to censor the film as had been suggested.

== Tuesday, February 28, 1928 ==
- U.S. Secretary of State Frank B. Kellogg sent a note to French Foreign Minister Aristide Briand stating that the United States desired to abolish the institution of war, and proposing an international treaty that would come to be known as the Kellogg–Briand Pact.
- Mark the discovery of the Raman effect by Indian physicist Sir C. V. Raman on 28 February 1928 for which he was awarded the Nobel Prize in Physics in 1930 . National Science Day is celebrated in India on February 28 every year for that particular reason.
- Died:
  - Armando Diaz, 66, Italian general
  - Karl Max, Prince Lichnowsky, 67, German diplomat

== Wednesday, February 29, 1928 ==
- A French court refused to grant American lawyer and politician Bainbridge Colby a divorce, declaring itself "incompetent" to do so because both parties involved were foreigners and Mrs. Colby was not present. The ruling was viewed as an end to the practice of Americans coming to France for easy dissolutions of marriage in the country's "divorce mills".
- Born: Joss Ackland, British actor in Kensington, London (d. 2023)
- Died: Adolphe Appia, 65, Swiss architect and stage set designer
