= Daniels Run (Tenmile Creek tributary) =

Stream in Pennsylvania, USA

Daniels Run Tributary to Tenmile Creek
- Location of Daniels Run mouth Daniels Run (Tenmile Creek tributary) (the United States)

Location
- Country: United States
- State: Pennsylvania
- County: Washington

Physical characteristics
- Source: Little Chartiers Creek divide
  - location: about 0.5 miles s of Glyde, Pennsylvania
  - coordinates: 40°07′09″N 080°08′11″W
  - elevation: 1,218 ft (371 m)
- Mouth: Tenmile Creek
  - location: West Zollarsville, Pennsylvania
  - coordinates: 40°01′28″N 080°05′20″W
  - elevation: 873 ft (266 m)
- Length: 7.82 mi (12.59 km)
- Basin size: 17.31 square miles (44.8 km^{2})
- Discharge
  - location: Tenmile Creek
  - average: 20.15 cu ft/s (0.571 m^{3}/s) at mouth with Tenmile Creek

Basin features
- Progression: generally south
- River system: Monongahela River
- Tributaries
  - left: unnamed tributaries
  - right: Little Daniels Run
- Bridges: Church Road, Lindley Road, Burson Road, Spring Valley Road, Lone Pine Road

Daniels Run is a 7.82-mile-long (12.59 km) third-order tributary to Tenmile Creek in Washington County, Pennsylvania.

== Variant names ==
According to the Geographic Names Information System, it has also been known historically as:

- Daniel Run

== Course ==
Daniels Run rises about 0.5 miles (0.80 km) south of Glyde, Pennsylvania, and then flows south to join Tenmile Creek at West Zollarsville.

== Watershed ==
Daniels Run drains 17.31 square miles (44.8 km^{2}) of area, receives about 40.3 in/year of precipitation, has a wetness index of 311.05 and is about 65% forested.

== See also ==
- List of rivers of Pennsylvania
