= Greenly Island, Canada =

Island in Blanc-Sablon, Quebec

Coordinates: 51.3792°N 57.1893°W

Greenly Island (French, Île Greenly) is an island in Blanc-Sablon, Quebec, Canada, near the border of Newfoundland and Labrador, in the Gulf of Saint Lawrence at the southwestern end of Strait of Belle Isle. The rocky surface of Greenly Island has a thin cover of herbaceous vegetation. A fishing settlement and lighthouse are on the island.

== Migratory bird sanctuary ==
With Aux Perroquets Island it forms the Baie de Brador Migratory Bird Sanctuary. It is protected, and no one is allowed on the island during the spring and summer without a permit. Ministère des Ressources naturelles du Québec (Greenly Island) and the Province of Québec Society for the Protection of Birds (Aux Perroquets Island) are the landowners of the islands in the Migratory Bird Sanctuary. More than a dozen species of seabirds, including the ring-billed gull, the herring gull, tern species, the razorbill, the black guillemot and the Atlantic puffin, flock to Greenly Island during the breeding season.

== History ==
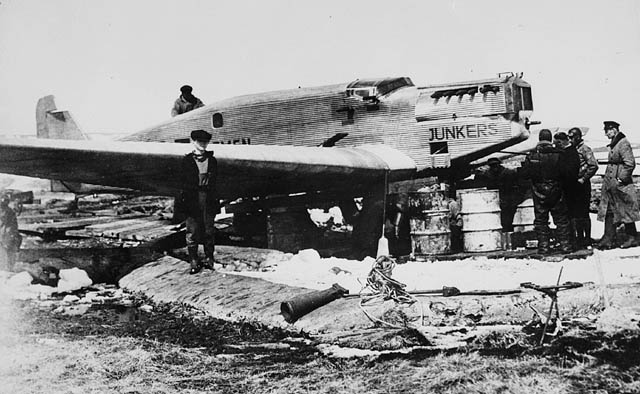
The Bremen at Greenly Island, after the transatlantic crossing.

The Bremen landed on Greenly Island on April 13, 1928, after the first successful east–west crossing of the Atlantic by an aircraft. The first person to see the plane was Antoine Letemplier; when first sighted, he ran to his parents and shouted "Flying fish! Flying fish!"

== Sources ==
- Environment Canada's Baie de Brador website
