= Muscle Shoals Bill =

20th-century American legislation

The Muscle Shoals Bill was designed to build a dam in the Tennessee River and sell government-produced electricity. Congress passed bills to harness energy from the Tennessee River, but presidents Coolidge and Hoover insisted that private enterprise should do the job, and vetoed the bills.

The chief sponsor, Senator George Norris of Nebraska, had blocked a proposal from Henry Ford to develop the dam site.

Hoover's veto message stated:

I am firmly opposed to the Government entering into any business the major purpose of which is competition with our citizens. There are national emergencies which require that the Government should temporarily enter the field of business, but they must be emergency actions and in matters where the cost of the project is secondary to much higher considerations. There are many localities where the Federal Government is justified in the construction of great dams and reservoirs, where navigation, flood control, reclamation, or stream regulation are of dominant importance, and where they are beyond capacity or purpose of private or local government capital to construct. In these cases power is often a by-product and should be disposed of by contract or lease. But for the Federal Government deliberately to go out to build up and expand such an occasion to the major purpose of a power and manufacturing business is to break down the initiative and enterprise of the American people; it is the negation of the ideals upon which our civilization has been based.

Norris demanded public power because he distrusted privately owned utilities. Norris said of Hoover:

Using his power of veto, he destroyed the Muscle Shoals bill--a measure designated to use the great government property at Muscle Shoals for the cheapening of fertilizer for American agriculture and utilization of the surplus power for the benefit of people without transmission distance of the development. The power people want no yardstick which would expose their extortionate rates so Hoover killed the bill after it had been passed by both houses of congress.

The idea for the Muscle Shoals Bill in 1933 became part of the New Deal's Tennessee Valley Authority (TVA).
