= Morgan Township, Pennsylvania =

Township in Pennsylvania, US

Coordinates: 40°00′03″N 80°03′59″W

Morgan Township, Greene County, Pennsylvania
- Township
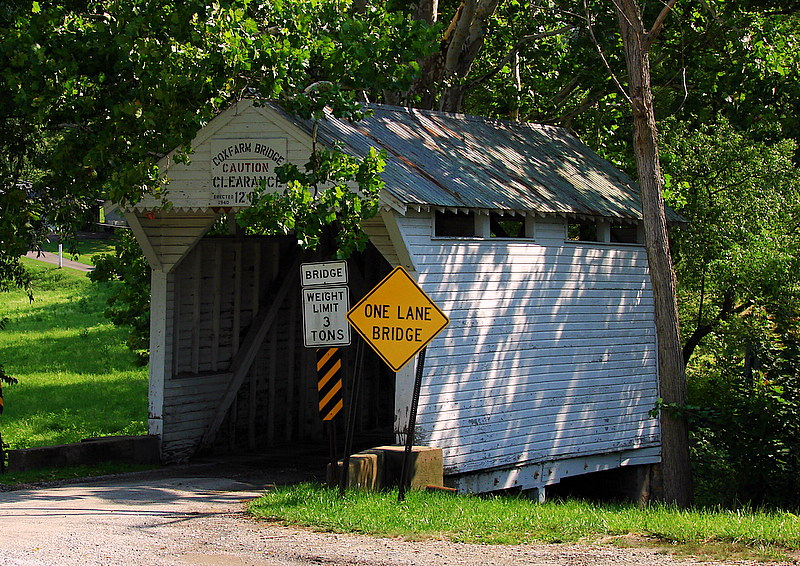
- Cox Farm Covered Bridge

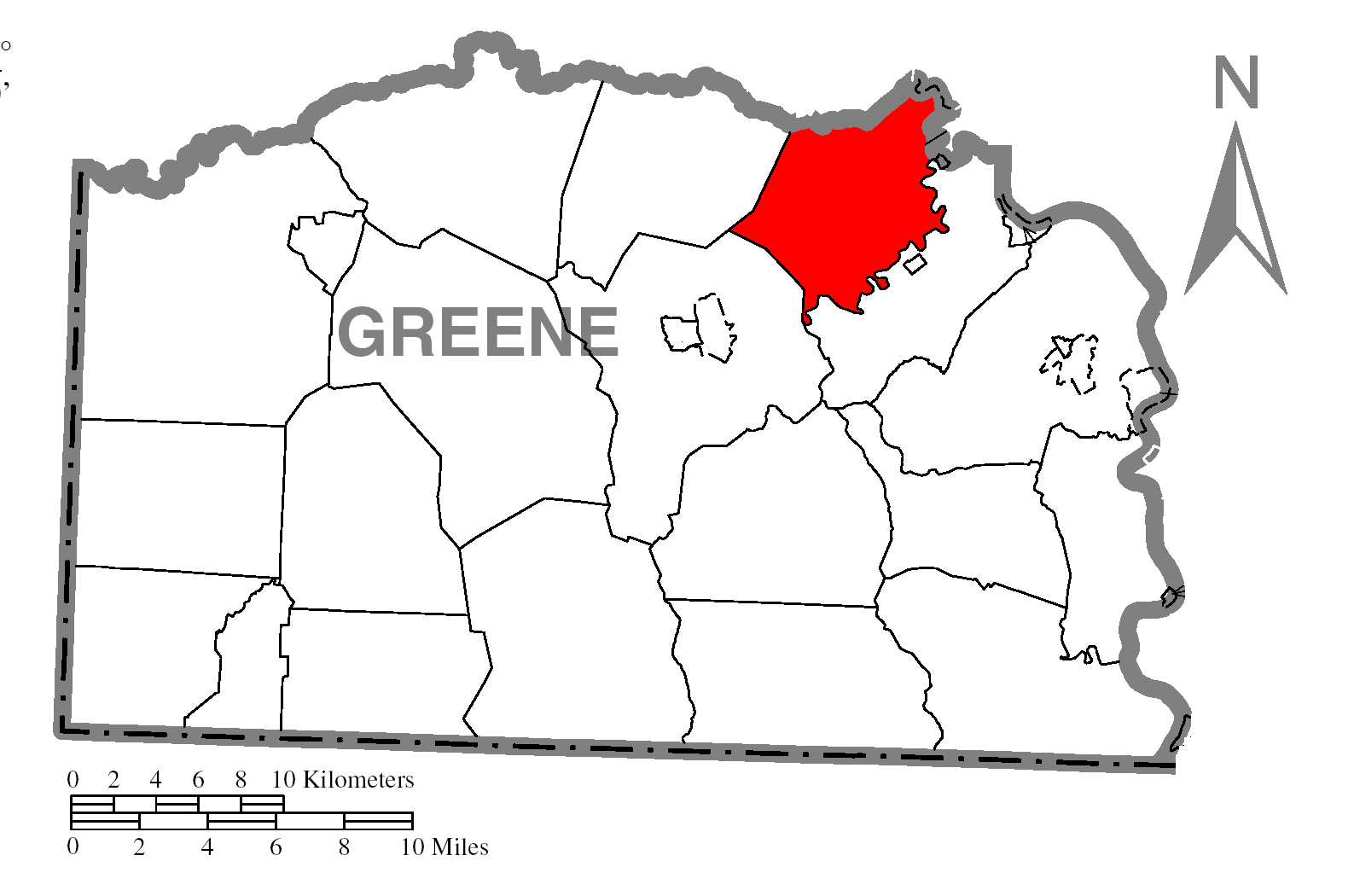
- Location of Morgan Township in Greene County

- Location of Greene County in Pennsylvania
- Country: United States
- State: Pennsylvania
- County: Greene

Area
  - Total: 24.72 sq mi (64.03 km^{2})
  - Land: 24.70 sq mi (63.98 km^{2})
  - Water: 0.015 sq mi (0.04 km^{2})

Population (2020)
  - Total: 2,338 ▼
  - Estimate (2023): 2,224
  - Density: 99.3/sq mi (38.34/km^{2})
- Time zone: UTC-4 (EST)
  - Summer (DST): UTC-5 (EDT)
- Area code: 724
- FIPS code: 42-059-50992

Morgan Township is a township that is located in Greene County, Pennsylvania, United States. The population was 2,338 at the time of the 2020 census.

== Geography ==
Morgan Township is located in northeastern Greene County and is bordered to the north by Washington County. Tenmile Creek, an eastward-flowing tributary of the Monongahela River, forms the short northeastern border of the township, while the South Fork of Tenmile Creek forms the longer southeastern border. The borough of Clarksville, located between the two creeks at their confluence, borders the northeastern corner of the township.

According to the United States Census Bureau, the township has a total area of 24.7 square miles (64.0 km^{2}), of which 0.02 square miles (0.04 km^{2}), or 0.06%, are water.

Unincorporated communities in the township include Teagarden Homes, Burson Plan, Chartiers, Mather, Stony Point, and Lippincott.

== Demographics ==
Historical population
Census	Pop.	Note	%±
2000	2,600		—
2010	2,587		−0.5%
2020	2,338		−9.6%
2025 (est.)	2,187		−6.5%
U.S. Decennial Census

As of the census of 2000, there were 2,600 people, 1,025 households, and 744 families residing in the township.

The population density was 106.0 inhabitants per square mile (40.9/km^{2}). There were 1,117 housing units at an average density of 45.5 per square mile (17.6/km^{2}).

The racial makeup of the township was 98.69% White, 0.46% African American, 0.23% Native American, 0.08% Asian, 0.04% from other races, and 0.50% from two or more races. Hispanic or Latino of any race were 0.38% of the population.

There were 1,025 households, out of which 27.9% had children under the age of eighteen living with them; 58.0% were married couples living together, 10.3% had a female householder with no husband present, and 27.4% were non-families. 24.7% of all households were made up of individuals, and 12.5% had someone living alone who was sixty-five years of age or older.

The average household size was 2.53 and the average family size was 2.98.

Within the township, the population was spread out, with 22.7% of residents who were under the age of eighteen, 8.0% who were aged eighteen to twenty-four, 27.8% who were aged twenty-five to forty-four, 25.7% who were aged forty-five to sixty-four, and 15.7% who were sixty-five years of age or older. The median age was forty years.

For every one hundred females there were 100.2 males. For every one hundred females who were aged eighteen or older, there were 93.4 males.

The median income for a household in the township was $33,629, and the median income for a family was $38,009. Males had a median income of $34,659 compared with that of $22,301 for females.

The per capita income for the township was $15,588.

Approximately 10.6% of families and 13.3% of the population were living below the poverty line, including 19.7% of those who were under the age of eighteen and 7.0% of those who were aged sixty-five or older.

== Government and infrastructure ==
A state prison site was located in Morgan Township; originally it was a juvenile prison operated by the Pennsylvania Department of Public Welfare. This became the Pennsylvania Department of Corrections State Correctional Institution – Waynesburg, an adult prison, in 1984. It closed in 2003, and the land was sold to Basalt Trap Rock Co.

== Education ==
The school district is the Jefferson-Morgan School District.
