= Mather, Pennsylvania =

Unincorporated community in Pennsylvania, US

- Census-designated place
- Location within Pennsylvania Location within the United States
- Coordinates: 39°56′08″N 80°04′31″W
- Country: United States
- State: Pennsylvania
- County: Greene
- Township: Morgan

Area
  - Total: 0.88 sq mi (2.28 km^{2})
  - Land: 0.88 sq mi (2.28 km^{2})
  - Water: 0.0039 sq mi (0.01 km^{2})
- Elevation: 978 ft (298 m)

Population (2020)
  - Total: 659
  - Density: 750.0/sq mi (289.56/km^{2})
- Time zone: UTC-5 (Eastern (EST))
  - Summer (DST): UTC-4 (EDT)
- ZIP code: 15346
- FIPS code: 42-48064
- GNIS feature ID: 2630023

Mather is an unincorporated community and census-designated place in Morgan Township, Pennsylvania, United States. The community is located 1 mile (1.6 km) northwest of the borough of Jefferson, near Pennsylvania Route 188. It is 5 miles (8 km) northeast of Waynesburg, the Greene County seat. According to the 2010 census, the population of Mather was 737.

== Demographics ==
Historical population
Census	Pop.	Note	%±
2010	737		—
2020	659		−10.6%
U.S. Decennial Census
