= Tenmile Creek (Pennsylvania) =

River in Pennsylvania

Tenmile Creek Tributary to Monongahela River
- Location of Tenmile Creek mouth Tenmile Creek (Pennsylvania) (the United States)

Location
- Country: United States of America
- State: Pennsylvania
- County: Greene; Washington

Physical characteristics
- Source: divide between Tenmile Creek and Chartiers Creek
  - location: about 2 miles west of Lagonda, Pennsylvania
  - coordinates: 40°07′01″N 80°19′25″W
  - elevation: 1,290 ft (390 m)
- Mouth: Monongahela River
  - location: Millsboro, Pennsylvania
  - coordinates: 39°59′04″N 79°59′57″W
  - elevation: 763 ft (233 m)
- Length: 35.15 mi (56.57 km)
- Basin size: 337.91 square miles (875.2 km^{2})
- Discharge
  - average: 379.77 cu ft/s (10.754 m^{3}/s) at mouth with Monongahela River

Basin features
- Progression: southeast
- River system: Monongahela River
- Tributaries
  - left: Bane Creek; Montgomery Run; Smith Run; Little Tenmile Creek; Horn Run; Daniels Run; Plum Run; Black Hollow
  - right: Crafts Creek; Short Creek; Hufford Run; Patterson Run; Barrs Run; South Fork Tenmile Creek

Tenmile Creek is a stream in Washington and Greene Counties, Pennsylvania, USA. It is a tributary of the Monongahela River.

== Name origin ==
Tenmile Creek was so named on account of frequent branches, occurring about every 10 miles (16 km). The creek's name is sometimes spelled Ten Mile Creek or Ten-Mile Creek.

== Tributaries ==
The major tributary of Tenmile Creek is South Fork Tenmile Creek, which rises in western Greene County and flows generally east entering Tenmile Creek at Clarksville, Pennsylvania. The watershed is roughly 24% agricultural, 68% forested and the rest is other uses.

South Fork Tenmile Creek has a number of smaller tributaries, including Grimes Run on the left, which rises in central Greene County and flows southeast entering South Fork Tenmile Creek northeast of Morrisville, Pennsylvania. The watershed is roughly 15% agricultural, 74% forested and the rest is other uses.

== See also ==
- List of rivers of Pennsylvania
