= Anna David =

Anna David may refer to:

- Anna David (academic), British obstetrician
- Anna David (singer) (born 1984), Danish pop and soul music singer
- Anna David (journalist) (born 1970), American journalist
