= Cheat! =

- Country of origin: United States
- No. of episodes: 174

Production
- Running time: 21-22 minutes

Original release
- Network: G4
- Release: May 1, 2002 – February 19, 2009

Cheat! is a television program on G4 that provides cheat codes, strategies, and other hidden features for video games. The show was hosted by Kristin Adams (née Holt), who replaced original host Cory Rouse in January 2005. Cheat! last aired February 19, 2009 on G4.

== History ==
=== The Cory Rouse years ===
Cheat! was one of the first shows to be on G4 when it launched in spring 2002. Host Cory Rouse would give tips and cheats on a couple of games from the studio in the early episodes. In fall 2002, G4 made a deal with Pringles to have them sponsor the show. Cheat was now officially known as "Cheat, Pringles Gamer's Guides". Cheat was one of G4's most popular shows. In certain episodes Rouse would leave the studio and film on location based on the game he was reviewing. Notable episodes of these years include Rouse getting advice from the staff at Tips and Tricks magazine, looking at Star Wars: Knights of the Old Republic as a Jedi Knight and Sith Lord, and looking at The Matrix.

=== Following the merger of G4 and TechTV ===
In spring of 2004, G4 announced a merge with TechTV. While many shows on both networks were cancelled, Cheat! survived the merger and production continued on the newest season. In summer of 2004, after a dispute, Pringles ended its sponsorship of Cheat. G4TechTV continued to produce the remainder of the season with the original Cheat logo and the name was changed back to Cheat. G4TechTV promised a relaunch next season. Rouse looked at more games into the fall as the season wrapped up, including driving around in a Jeep looking at The Simpsons: Hit & Run and playing James Bond with G4tv.com host Tina Wood looking at Everything or Nothing. The season finale aired in October, which was dedicated to Doom 3. After the October episode, Rouse left the show.

=== The Kristin Adams years ===
In January 2005, former American Idol contestant Kristin Adams (then credited as "Kristin Holt", as it preceded her marriage), was quietly hired to replace Cory Rouse. The new season launched with an episode dedicated to Grand Theft Auto: San Andreas. She was met with mixed reactions, with many fans believing she was a poor replacement for Rouse, whereas others were more welcoming. G4 made a season with her, which wasn't as successful, presumably due to G4 already losing much of its audience since the merger. The new episodes were all dedicated to one game, where before different games would be included in each episode. Holt also stayed in studio every episode, while Rouse left on location. At the conclusion of the season in the fall, Cheat! was again put on hiatus.

In summer of 2006, G4 announced that Cheat! would be renewed for another season. The new season was filmed in the Attack of the Show studio, and the premiere brought back the concept of many games in every episode. The season finale aired in December.

After a prolonged hiatus, it was confirmed on G4's website that new episodes of Cheat! would begin airing in December, 2008. It proved to be the final season, as the show was subsequently phased out in early 2009.

=== As a segment of X-Play ===
Beginning in January 2008, Cheat! was integrated as a segment into the series X-Play. Adams returned for the segment.
