= Laura Foy =

American television producer

Laura Foy (born March 16, 1976, in Oakdale, New York) is an American former television producer and former co-host alongside Tina Wood, Geoff Keighley, and Scot Rubin of the interactive video game television program G4tv.com on G4.

Foy began her television career in New York City, where she co-hosted an online show entitled Lilith and Eve on AllGamesNetwork. She directed a daily, live, one-hour talk show about video games called GameTime and also co-hosted a show called Judgecal's High Weirdness. Laura was also once a contestant on the U.S. version of the game show The Weakest Link. The episode originally aired on November 18, 2003.

Her nickname is "Thug".

Foy is known for dismissing the real-time strategy and puzzle genres in favor of first-person shooters.

Announced on Tina Wood's personal blog, the series was cancelled by G4 and the final episode of G4tv.com was filmed on December 16, 2005.

Foy is now director of digital marketing for Homebridge, a national mortgage lending firm.
