= GameTrailers =

Video game news website

- Available in: English
- Founded: March 25, 2002
- Dissolved: February 19, 2016
- Headquarters: Santa Monica, California, United States
- Owner: IGN
- Founders: Geoffrey R. Grotz, Brandon Jones
- Industry: Video game journalism
- Website: gametrailers.com
- Registration: Optional
- Current status: Brand continued as a YouTube channel hosting archived videos and new video game trailers

GameTrailers (GT) was an American video gaming website created by Geoffrey R. Grotz and Brandon Jones in 2002. The website specialized in multimedia content, including trailers and gameplay footage of upcoming and recently released video games, as well as an array of original video content focusing on video games, including reviews, countdown shows, and other web series.

GameTrailers was acquired by Viacom in November 2005; under its ownership, GameTrailers also produced a television series, GameTrailers TV with Geoff Keighley, for sister property Spike TV. In 2014, the site was acquired by Defy Media. In February 2016, the site was shut down; rights to GameTrailers' brand and content were sold to IGN Entertainment, which continues to run its YouTube channel. GT's remaining staff went on to found the independent gaming publication Easy Allies.

== History ==
GameTrailers was founded by Geoff Grotz and Brandon Jones (the latter who was the primary narrating voice of the company's videos throughout its existence) in 2002. Jon Slusser and his company Hornet Animation invested in the startup, and Jon took over as CEO. The company was then acquired by MTV Networks in November 2005 for an undisclosed sum. On March 18, 2006, Shane Satterfield was hired as GameTrailers' first editor-in-chief and supervising producer.

In 2007, MTV Networks restructured its entertainment division, merging Ifilm.com and SpikeTV.com into Spike.com, and grouping this new property, GameTrailers and Xfire, into Spike Digital Entertainment, with Jon Slusser as the new SVP in charge, Geoff Grotz as Vice President of Product Development, Shane Satterfield as Vice President of Content, and Brad Winters as the new general manager of GameTrailers.com.

In June 2014, GameTrailers was purchased by Defy Media. Soon after, it was reported that senior members of GameTrailers were fired, which is about two-thirds of full-time staff. On June 1, 2015, Shane Satterfield launched a hand-curated social network for gaming enthusiasts under the name SIFTD. On February 8, 2016, GameTrailers was shut down. Since 2016, IGN Entertainment has owned the GameTrailers brand and back catalog. The company will continue to maintain the GameTrailers YouTube channel, uploading archived original content, and posting new trailers via the channel. On March 21, 2016, a majority of the remaining staff at GameTrailers, including Brandon Jones, launched a series of new Patreon-supported channels under the new name Easy Allies. Easy Allies launched on March 21, 2016 and intended to continue their work after GameTrailers. They created a role-playing (RPG) game show Mysterious Monsters, in which participants use RPG mechanics and answer trivia questions.

== Original content ==
The first version of the GameTrailers magazine style show was GT Weekly and premiered in August 2005, hosted by Amanda MacKay and Daniel Kayser. After 44 episodes, in March 2007, the show was rebranded as GameOne and given a live chat where viewers could talk about the show.

In February 2007, ScrewAttack started providing content including Top Tens, Video Game Vault entries and episodes of Angry Video Game Nerd for GameTrailers. Shortly after, Spike's Game Head also started to cooperate with GameTrailers.

On January 25, 2008, GameOne was replaced by GameTrailers TV, the rebranded version of Spike TV's Game Head, still hosted by Geoff Keighley, but produced by GameTrailers and co-hosted by Amanda MacKay and Daniel Kayser. The show appeared at 12:30 AM on Spike every Thursday night.

=== Invisible Walls ===
Invisible Walls
- Genre: Video gaming
- Language: English

Cast and voices
- Hosted by: Shane Satterfield; Marcus Beer; Ryan Stevens (episodes 239–284)

Production
- Camera: Rich Brown
- Length: Approximately 30–90 minutes

Technical specifications
- Video format: MP4
- Audio format: MP3

Publication
- No. of episodes: 284 (excluding special episodes and other videos)
- Original release: March 14, 2008 – January 17, 2014
- Provider: GameTrailers
- Updates: Weekly (Fridays)

Related
- Website: Invisible Walls on GameTrailers

Invisible Walls was a video blog-podcast created and hosted by editor-in-chief Shane Satterfield and run by the staff of GameTrailers with freelance journalist Marcus Beer, who originally came to the show on a biweekly basis as the ever-angry character "Grumpy McGrump", as co-host. The podcast was eventually hosted by editorial director Ryan Stevens after Shane Satterfield left GameTrailers after Episode 238. They were often joined by a rotating panel of GT editors including Justin Speer, Daniel Bloodworth, Michael Damiani, Patrick Morales, Chris Nguyen, and (formerly) Miguel Lopez. The show's debut episode was recorded on March 13, 2008, and published the following day. The podcast was a semi-round table discussion show, in which GameTrailers staff members discussed various goings-on in the video game industry, including new video game releases and controversies.

The show underwent some major overhauls throughout its run; for its one-hundredth episode, the show introduced new visual graphics (including new avatars for the cast designed by iam8bit, a new intro also done with iam8bit, and a new logo) and stopped censoring profanities. On the show's two-hundredth episode, which was streamed and recorded live for the milestone occasion, the show began recording with the hosts on-camera and the hosts' avatars were no longer used, although the hosts were seen recording on-camera for Episode 150 and had to record themselves without being seen one last time on Episode 201, due to not having cameras on hand at the 2012 Game Developers Conference and for the new Invisible Walls studio to be prepared.

The podcast ended after publishing Episode 284 on January 17, 2014. It was initially replaced by a short-lived show called Thanks for Playing!, which lasted until April 25, 2014, with a true final episode published on June 27, 2014. A later revival podcast called GT Time, which features some of the Invisible Walls regulars including Damiani and Bloodworth, debuted on March 14, 2014 (which was coincidentally the six-year anniversary of the debut episode of Invisible Walls) and lasted until February 2016.

=== Other shows ===
- GT Countdown – A top ten list of video games and video game-related subjects. Ended in October 2015.
- GT Wish-List – A compilation of all things the GameTrailers team wishes will be in an upcoming game. Usually the game has divulged very little information about itself at the point of the release of the wish-list, thus there is a lot of speculation as to what the game could be.
- Bonus Round^{*} – A panel show hosted by Geoff Keighley, typically featuring three guests who are some combination of game developers, industry journalists and/or industry financial experts. The show focuses not just on critical analysis of particular games but also on the process of game development (including technical and design innovation) as well as publishing, sales, marketing, and business practices in the gaming industry. Ended in 2015.
- The Final Bosman – A weekly show hosted by Kyle Bosman airing Wednesdays, where he talks about current gaming topics from his perspective with humorous quips. Ended in 2016.
- Trailer Score (previously known as Let's All Go To The Trailers) – A weekly show, in which Brandon Jones, Kyle Bosman and Daniel Bloodworth discuss and rate the newest video game trailers.
- GT Time – A weekly podcast show hosted by Kyle Bosman, in which a panel discuss the latest video game related news stories and make bets about what will happen during the next week. Ended in February 2016.
- Baddest Games – A weekly show hosted by Rob Slusser, where he talks in an intentionally awkward manner about video games that got bad reviews by the press and therefore were good in his opinion. According to his Twitter account, Slusser will no longer be with GameTrailers in the wake of Defy Media acquiring the company.
- GT TV – An informative show on the gaming industry and upcoming games hosted by Geoff Keighley.
- GT Previews^{*} – Previews of upcoming games.
- Level^{*} – A show where the GameTrailers team talks about their favorite levels from their favorite games.
- GT Reviews^{*} – Reviews of various video games that are scored on a 1.0 through 10.0 scale. As of their Dead Space 3 review in 2013, GameTrailers has stopped providing separate sub-scores and segments for different elements of a game (which used to include story [if necessary], design, gameplay, and presentation) in favor of more cinematic videos, and the people who reviewed the game and edited the video are now mentioned in the intro. As of February 8, 2016, Firewatch was the last video game reviewed on GameTrailers.
  - GT Review Pods – Shorter video reviews for independent, downloadable and/or lesser-known video games or game content (such as expansions). After the 2012 revamp, the name was discontinued, but the shorter reviews are still made on a regular basis. Until 2013, these shorter reviews did not have different segments for the different elements of a game, but they still had the now-discontinued sub-scores.
- Retrospectives – A history of the stories of video game franchises usually in multiple parts.
- GT Pop-Block – A closer look on game trailers showing the findings of GameTrailers staff in that specific trailer.
- Anthology – A collection of the essential entries in the virtual library of video game greatness.
- Angry Video Game Nerd – Video game review rants starring and created by James Rolfe from Cinemassacre Productions, about a frustrated video game reviewer who plays retro games, and occasionally, more contemporary ones. In 2013, Rolfe decided to continue his show independently on YouTube and Cinemassacre.com.
- Pach-Attack!^{*} – A show hosted by financial analyst Michael Pachter where he answers questions submitted by GameTrailers users regarding the video game industry from a financial perspective. Ended in July 2014 after GameTrailers was acquired by Defy Media, in 2015, Pachter created a new show called Pachter Factor on YouTube channel.
- Pop-Fiction – Short 5–10 minute episodes that center around myths and urban legends in video games.
- Timeline – An in-depth look into the chronology, history, and story progression of popular gaming franchises. Only The Legend of Zelda and Kingdom Hearts have received this treatment. A Metal Gear episode was planned and announced to be released in 2014, but it was quietly cancelled.
- Top 100 Trailers of All Time – A top 100 countdown list of the best video game trailers ever made, as determined by the GameTrailers staff, which ran throughout September 1 to October 8, 2011. The first four episodes focused on a score of various game trailers and the top 20 trailers each received their own individual episode, all with commentary on each selection. Honorable mentions were also displayed during the episodes and the final episode focused on the ten video game trailers voted the best by GameTrailers viewers.
- Annoyed Gamer – A now defunct show hosted by Marcus Beer, where he discusses polemic topics that can harm gamers as well as the industry. Ended in 2014.
- Mandatory Update – A comedic show on a weekly basis that's presenting the weekly news in humorous fashion hosted by Elyse Willems and Isla Hinck. Before his firing, Rob Slusser served as a comic relief for the show in between bits. Occasionally, the show is replaced by an hour long podcast known as Mandatory Update Nights. The show ended on February 6, 2016, two days before GameTrailers was shut down; Easy Allies revived the show on July 3, 2021.
- Trailer Academy – A show hosted by founder Brandon Jones analyzing video game trailers and discussing what's making a good video game trailer.
- GT News – A daily news show hosted by Andrea Rene featuring the latest headlines from across the video game industry. Ended in 2015.
- Huber Hype – Acclaimed hype enthusiast Michael Huber hits terminal velocity each week in the pursuit of ultimate hype. In 2016, after GameTrailers was shut down, the show is succeeded by Huber Syndrome on Easy Allies.
- Ladies in the Lobby – This six-part series provides a female perspective into gaming though a series of interviews with Elyse Willems, Andrea Rene, Stephanie Bayer, Mari Takahashi, Jessica Villarreal, and Nikole Zivalich.
- Tabletop Adventures – Lailia Meliamne (Isla Hinck), Pervance Tosscobble (Elyse Willems), Andry Highhill (Kyle Bosman), and Hogger (Michael Huber) adventure through a devious and hilarious Dungeons & Dragons campaign prepared by Dungeon Master Ben Moore.
- First Fifteen – Kyle Bosman and someone else play through the first fifteen minutes of a random video game.

^* Was also available as a podcast.
