= Attack of the Show! =

American live television program

- Directed by: Alan Wu
- Starring: Kevin Pereira; Kevin Rose; Sarah Lane; Brendan Moran; Olivia Munn; Zachariah Selwyn; Layla Kayleigh; Alison Haislip; Kristin Adams; Candace Bailey; Sara Jean Underwood; Adam Sessler; Chris Gore; Anna David; Blair Herter; Tom Fulp; Morgan Webb; Chris Hardwick; Kassem G; Austin Creed; Fiona Nova; Gina Darling; Will Neff; William O'Neal
- Country of origin: United States
- Original language: English
- No. of episodes: 2,042

Production
- Executive producer: Vincent Rutherford (2008–12)
- Running time: 60–120 minutes
- Production company: G4 Media, LLC

Original release
- Network: G4
- Release: March 28, 2005 – January 23, 2013
- Release: November 18, 2021 – October 21, 2022

Attack of the Show! (AOTS) is an American live television variety program featuring segments on pop culture, video games, and movies. The program originally ran on G4 from 2005 until 2013, and featured Kevin Pereira, Olivia Munn, and Candace Bailey as hosts. It was revived in 2021 before being canceled again when the network closed in 2022. The second incarnation of the program featured an ensemble cast, including returning original host Pereira, Kassem G, Fiona Nova, Gina Darling, Will Neff, and Austin Creed.

== History ==
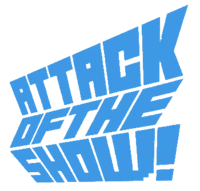
First logo used from March 28, 2005 to May 4, 2006.

The show premiered on March 28, 2005, as a replacement for The Screen Savers. The show originally aired live five days a week; the week of January 2, 2006, the show was truncated to air for only four days a week. Fridays featured a "Mash Up" that compiled segments from the week's four live shows. These segments often include skits, reviews, and general discussions. The show returned to live shows five days a week in September 2008, but G4 announced as of March 2, 2009, Attack of the Show! would go to four days a week with a "best of" show running in the Friday time-slot. Attack of the Show! aired its 1,000th episode in July 2009, which included a skit in which guest of the episode Alan Thicke kissed Olivia Munn. Attack of the Show! upgraded to high-definition on April 5, 2010, to coincide with its first-ever "Epic April" event of new premieres and stunts. Along with the addition of Candace Bailey, on January 1, 2011, Attack of the Show "respawned" with new graphics and a new set.

On October 26, 2012, G4 canceled Attack of the Show! due to low ratings, five months after Kevin Pereira canceled his contract. The series taped its final scenes on December 21, 2012.

On January 23, 2013, the final episode from the original run of Attack of the Show! aired. After a brief montage of clips from AOTS history and final goodbyes from the show's hosts and staff, the series ended with former Screen Savers hosts Patrick Norton and Leo Laporte in a coffee shop, acting as if the entire run of AOTS had been a dream. They then don "rocket packs" and fly off to work in a skyscraper adorned with the old TechTV logo, as the theme song of The Screen Savers plays. Afterwards, text came up on the screen against a gray background that read, "To our fans, our haters, and the Internet, thanks for seven kick-ass years. TTYL, Attack of the Show," with the Attack of the Show! theme playing at the end.

On February 8, 2013, the first run of Attack of the Show! aired for the final time as a scheduled program on G4, with the final original episode being re-aired.

On December 29, 2019, NBC's San Francisco-owned station KNTV aired a 30-minute special titled Best of Attack of the Show at 2:00am. While a slate at the top of the special said "This program originally aired on May 31, 2012," the special itself did not air on G4 that day, and it contained various clips from episodes past this date. NBC.com later put this special online, incorrectly citing that the special first aired on December 26, 2019.

On January 28, 2021, a relaunching G4 announced that Attack of the Show! would be returning as well. Kevin Pereira was announced to be returning as host in February. The new incarnation of Attack of the Show! premiered on the network on November 18, 2021. A long-form-interview-only version called Attack of the Show: The Loop premiered on November 17, 2021, featuring Adam Savage as guest. This version of the show was streamed on Wednesdays. Another version called Attack of the Show: Vibe Check premiered on November 23, 2021, which featured a rotating selection of hosts sitting at a table discussing various topics and answering viewer questions; this edition was streamed live on Tuesdays.

The revival was canceled with G4's closure less than a year later.

=== Personnel ===
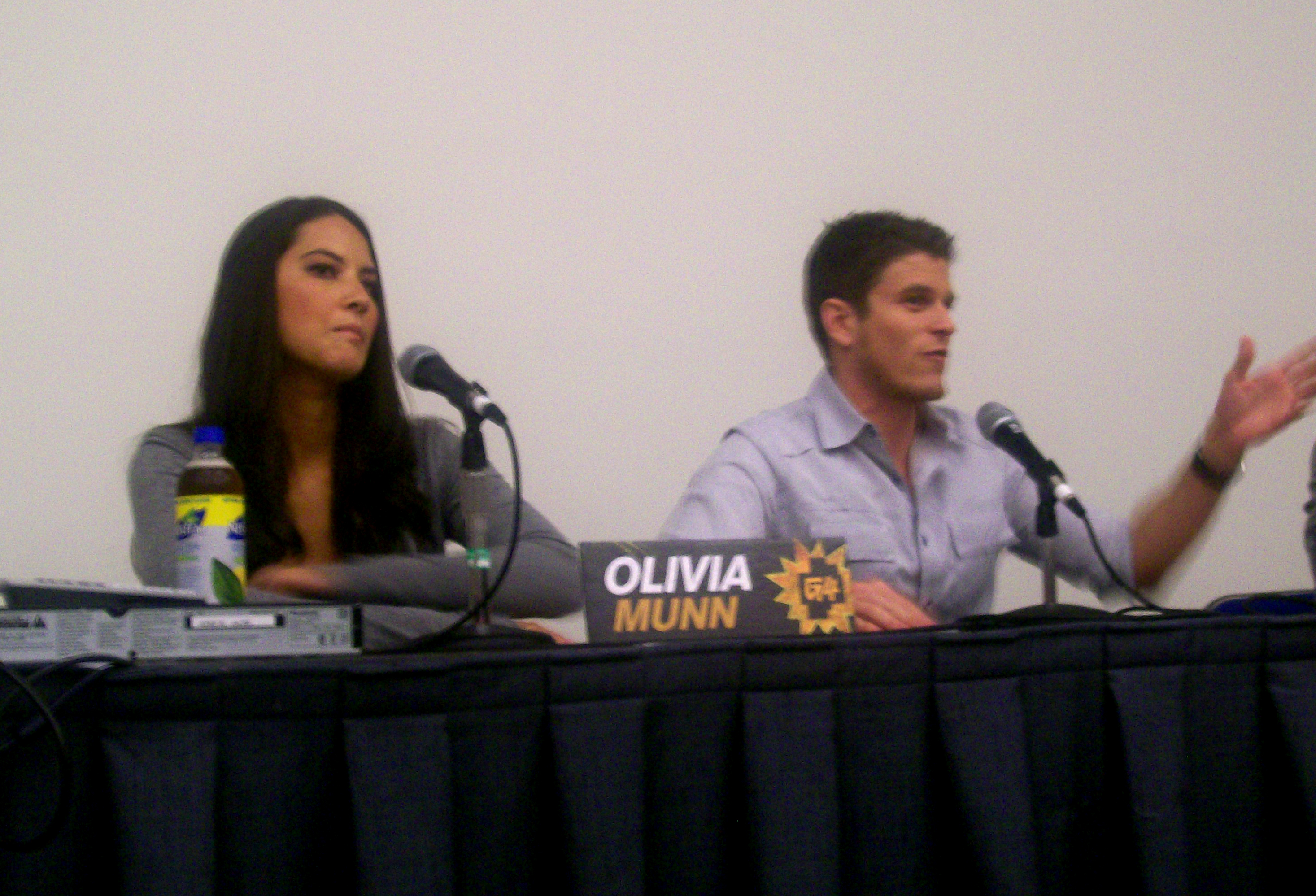
Olivia Munn and Kevin Pereira on a panel for Attack of the Show! at the 2008 San Diego Comic-Con

The original hosts of Attack of the Show! were Kevin Pereira, Kevin Rose, Sarah Lane, and Brendan Moran, who were carried over from their roles on The Screen Savers. Kevin Rose left G4 and AOTS on May 27, 2005. The show announced a search for a new host among the show's audience to replace Rose, and for several months various candidates auditioned on the air. In the end none of the candidates were actually selected, although this was never actually announced on the air. Sarah Lane, who had previously been a co-host and segment contributor, gradually took the role previously held by Rose alongside Pereira. She continued in this capacity until April 6, 2006, when she and Moran announced their engagement and stated that they would be leaving the show. Lane and Moran appeared on the show, via satellite, on July 13, 2006, to talk about their adventures.

Olivia Munn was hired to replace Lane and began hosting with Pereira on April 10, 2006. Zach Selwyn, the runner up on ESPN's Dream Job, was hired to replace Moran and started his hosting duties a week later on April 17, 2006. In 2006, Layla Kayleigh also joined the show as a correspondent for The Feed, a daily news segment. At this time, the hosts of AOTS were Pereira, Munn, Selwyn, and Kayleigh. Kayleigh left AOTS in 2009. At Comic-Con 2010, Munn said that she would not be leaving AOTS, though she only occasionally appeared on the show for the rest of that year. She was still featured in the opening credits and other AOTS set pieces and transitions until December 6, 2010.

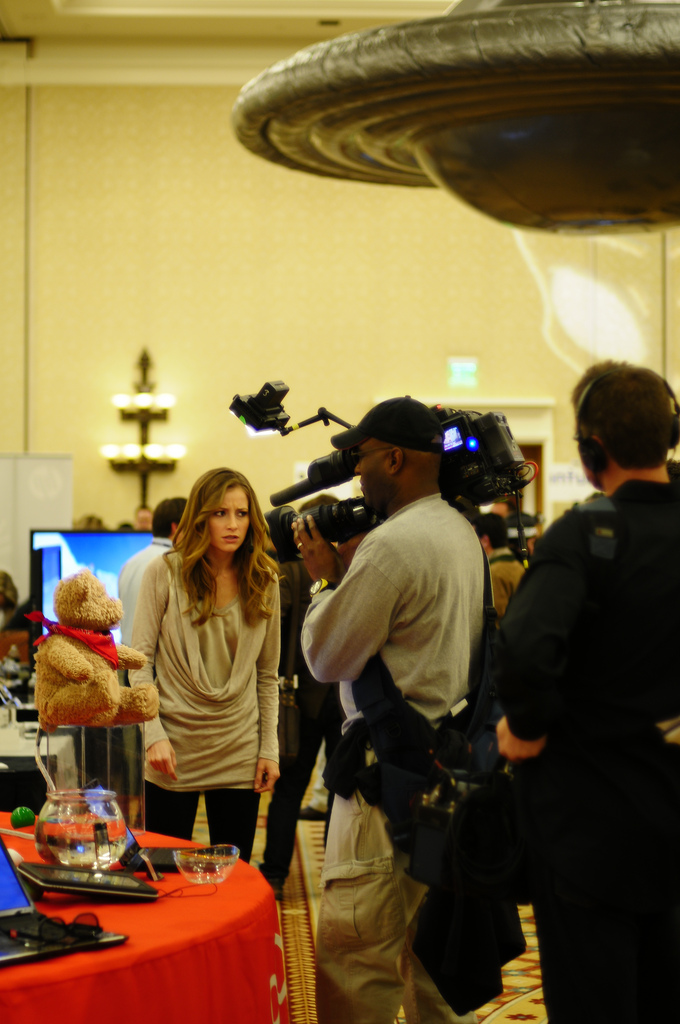
Candace Bailey in the production of an Attack of the Show! episode in January 2011.

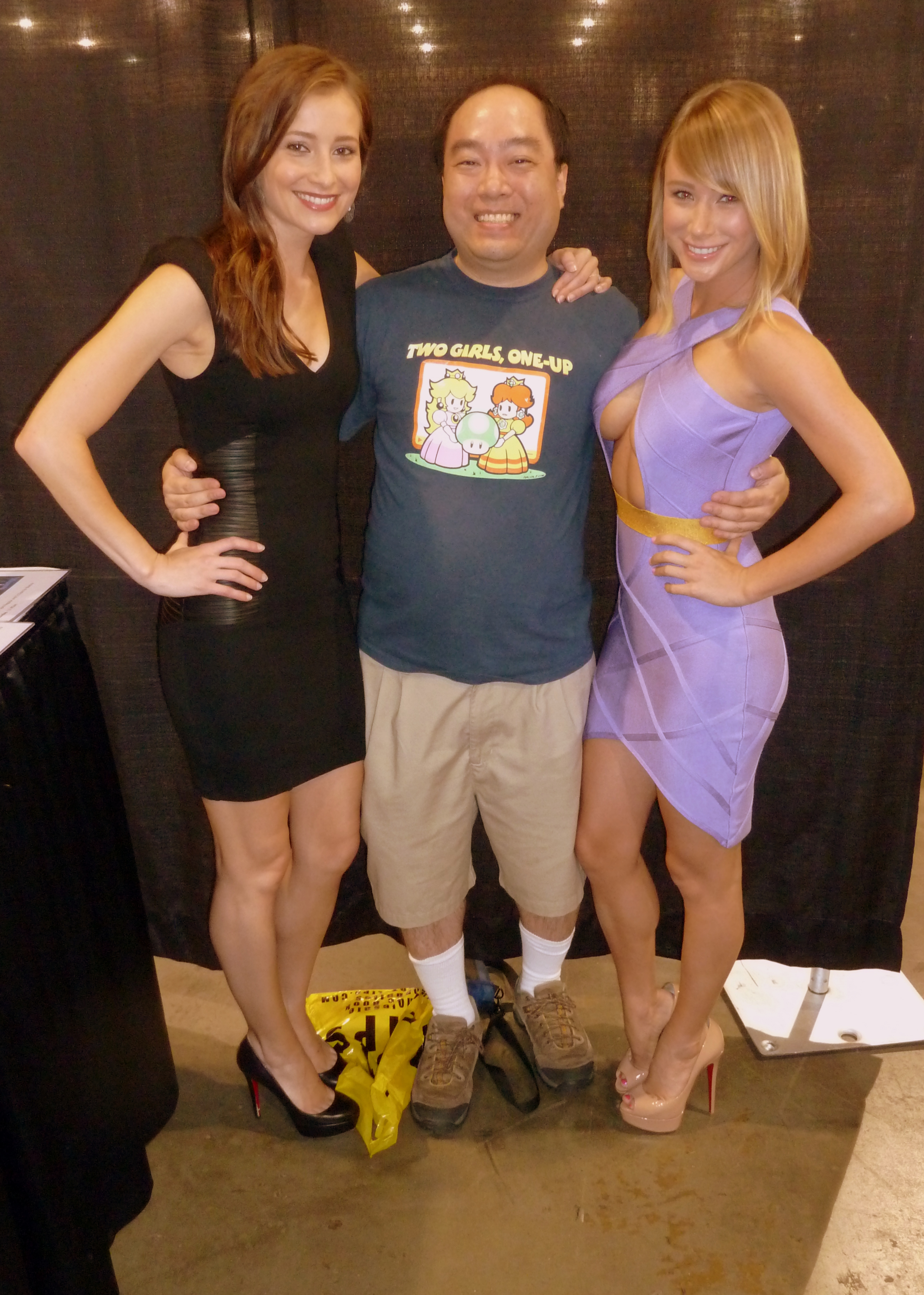
Candace Bailey and Sara Jean Underwood with a fan

After the departure of Munn, AOTS featured several guest co-hosts including: Candace Bailey, Jessica Chobot, Alison Haislip, Carrie Keagan, Alessandra Torresani, Sara Jean Underwood, Milynn Sarley, and Morgan Webb. Bailey became the new co-host with Pereira on January 11, 2011.

AOTS has also featured Chris Hardwick, Chris Gore, and Blair Herter in the occasional absence of Pereira. In addition to the interim cohosts, Grace Helbig has also filled in for Bailey.

On May 9, 2012, Pereira announced on-air that he was officially leaving AOTS to pursue work in television production. He stated, "I plan to turn my attention to full-time with my production company Super Creative and live touring nerd-carnival leetUP." His last day on AOTS was May 31. Beginning August 28, 2012, the show debuted a final new opening credit, with no reference to permanent or guest hosts. Kevin Pereira would host the game show Let's Ask America, which premiered on September 17, 2012. The final regular hosts of the first run of AOTS were Candace Bailey and Sara Jean Underwood.

Pereira was announced to be returning to host the second run of Attack of the Show! on February 12, 2021. Kassem G, Fiona Nova, Gina Darling, and Will Neff were announced as co-hosts on November 11, 2021. They are regularly joined by Austin Creed, with other network hosts like Ovilee May, Alex "Goldenboy" Mendez, Jirard "The Completionist" Khalil, and AustinShow occasionally making appearances.

As Attack of the Show was a Weekday show in its original incarnation, and thus never split into seasons, the current incarnation's Season 1 ended on August 11, 2022, announced as a Season Finale, with the new season beginning on August 31. Kevin Pereira's last day as a full-time host of Attack of the Show was on September 22, 2022, with an official handoff to new main host, Austin Creed. That run ended October 21, 2022.

=== Hosts and correspondents ===
First run (2005–2013)

- Kristin Adams, substitute co-host
- Alex Albrecht for video game segments
- Candace Bailey
- Blair Butler for "Fresh Ink"
- Jessica Chobot
- Anna David, host of "In Your Pants"
- Chris Gore, anchor for "DVDuesday"
- Alison Haislip
- Chris Hardwick for "Gadget Pr0n"
- Grace Helbig
- Blair Herter
- Layla Kayleigh, anchor of "The Feed"
- Sarah Lane
- Matt Mira, "Gadget Pr0n"
- Brendan Moran
- Olivia Munn
- William O'Neal
- Kevin Pereira
- Kevin Rose
- Weston Scott
- John Barrowman
- Tiffany Smith
- Sara Jean Underwood, anchor of "The Feed"
- Tina Wood Summerford

Second run (2021–2022)

- Austin Creed
- Gina Darling
- Kassem G, host of "Fresh Ink"
- Will Neff, host of "What's Will Watching"
- Fiona Nova, anchor of "The Feed"
- Kevin Pereira

== Segments ==
- "AOTS Classics"
- "AOTS LAN Party"
- "Around the Net"
- "Attack This!"
- "Blog Watch"
- "Damn Good Website"
- "Damn Good Download"
- "Dark Deals"
- "Dark Tips"
- "DVDuesday"
- "EB Games Top 10"
- "Epic Fail"
- "First 50"
- "Free Play Friday"
- "Fresh Ink"
- "Gadget Pr0n"
- "Game Break"
- "Gems of the Internet"
- "In Your Pants"
- "User Created"
- "Web Classics"
- "It Came from eBay"
- "Jimmy the Geek"
- "The Feed"
- "The Loop"
- "The Cooldown" (livestream only)
- "TLDR Theatre"
- "What's Will Watching"
- "Olivia's Rack"
- "Lil' Wil's Discount Warehouse"
