= G4tv.com (TV series) =

American entertainment television series

- Country of origin: United States
- No. of episodes: 173

Production
- Running time: 22 minutes

Original release
- Network: G4
- Release: May 8, 2002 – December 19, 2005

G4tv.com, also known as G4tv: The Show or simply G4tv, was a weekly video game talk show that aired on G4 and was produced by Laura Foy. The questions and polls used on the show were from the G4tv.com discussion forums live chatroom and were on any topic concerning games or the technology of gaming. At least one person who has worked in the video game industry was usually interviewed in each episode.

The show was hosted by Tina Wood, Laura Foy and Geoff Keighley. Keighley replaced original host and co-producer Scot Rubin. Production assistant and future Attack of the Show host, Kevin Pereira, occasionally filled in during host absences and managed live chat interaction.

On December 12, 2005, Tina Wood announced on her blog and on air that G4tv.com had been canceled. The final episode, titled "Goodbye", was taped on Friday, December 16, 2005, and aired on Monday, December 19, 2005.

== History ==
The original idea of the show dates back to when Scot Rubin first created the Internet-based radio show Game Time! on his All Games Interactive multimedia station in 1996 before co-founding G4. He continues the legacy with a new online daily podcast talk show titled "All Games Interactive" which episodes can be listened to by visiting the AllGames.com website and forums.
