= David Keighley =

Canadian film producer and IMAX executive

- Born: April 12, 1948; Toronto, Ontario, Canada
- Died: August 28, 2025 (aged 77)
- Occupations: Film producer, executive
- Known for: IMAX Corporation, large-format cinema
- Children: 3, including Geoff

David Bedford Keighley (April 12, 1948 – August 28, 2025) was a Canadian film producer and executive associated with the development of large-format cinema. He was a longtime executive at IMAX and served as the company’s first Chief Quality Officer, playing a central role in shaping the technical and presentation standards of the IMAX format.

== Early life and education ==
Keighley was born in Toronto, Ontario, Canada. He developed an early interest in photography and film, and studied photographic arts at Ryerson Polytechnic Institute (now Toronto Metropolitan University).

== Career ==
Keighley began his career in large-format filmmaking in the early 1970s after being inspired by the IMAX film North of Superior (1971). He worked on IMAX productions as an assistant director before becoming a producer.

Along with his wife and creative partner Patricia Keighley, he worked on more than 500 IMAX films over several decades, covering subjects ranging from nature and science to music and space exploration.

In 1988, Keighley sold his production company DKP 70mm to IMAX and joined the company in-house, where he became a central figure in maintaining and advancing IMAX’s technical standards.

He later became IMAX’s first Chief Quality Officer, overseeing the presentation quality of IMAX films globally. He was known for his attention to detail and involvement in film mastering and exhibition.

Keighley played a key role in IMAX’s transition from documentary filmmaking to major Hollywood productions, collaborating with directors such as James Cameron and Christopher Nolan. He also contributed to the adoption of new technologies including digital IMAX, 3D presentation, and laser projection systems.

Trade publication coverage from LF Examiner documents Keighley’s involvement in large-format film preservation and technical processes within the industry, including his work with DKP/70MM Inc. managing archival film elements.

== Personal life ==
Keighley was married to Patricia Keighley, with whom he frequently collaborated professionally. The couple had three children, including Geoff Keighley.

== Death ==
Keighley died on August 28, 2025, in New York City after a battle with cancer.

== Legacy ==
Keighley is widely regarded as a foundational figure in the development of IMAX as a global cinematic format. His work helped establish the technical standards that enabled IMAX to expand into mainstream feature filmmaking while maintaining high presentation quality. Filmmakers and collaborators have cited his influence on preserving large-format film and advancing the theatrical experience.

Christopher Nolan dedicated his 2026 film The Odyssey to David Keighley's memory with a card in the end credits that says "For our friend, David Keighley." Additionally, IMAX Corporation has begun using a new camera known as the IMAX Keighley Camera, which is named after David and his wife Patricia.
