= GameTrailers TV with Geoff Keighley =

American television series

- Also known as: GT.TV
- Starring: Geoff Keighley; Amanda MacKay; Daniel Kayser iJustine
- Composers: Kurt Bumbulis, Bruce Edwards
- Country of origin: United States
- Original language: English
- No. of seasons: 11

Production
- Executive producers: Geoff Keighley, Kevin Kay, Neil Schuurmans, Jon Slusser
- Producers: Jeremy Hoffmann, Joel Goodling
- Editors: Adam Greenstein (lead), Stephanie B. Keane, Pete Larsen, John Stobaugh, Mike Thoroe
- Running time: 30 minutes
- Production companies: MTV Networks; GameTrailers.com

Original release
- Network: Spike
- Release: January 14, 2005 – January 18, 2008
- Release: January 25, 2008 – November 22, 2013

Related
- Game Head

GameTrailers TV with Geoff Keighley (or GT.TV) is a television show about video games hosted by video game journalist Geoff Keighley. Originally titled Game Head, on January 25, 2008, the show relaunched under its current name with a slightly different format and further incorporation of GameTrailers hosts, Amanda MacKay and Daniel Kayser. The series ran from 2008–2013, with the GameTrailers site being shut down in 2016.

== Series overview ==
In the program, host Geoff Keighley, along with his correspondents, are seen on location at video game companies or interviewing with special guests while divulging exclusive information on upcoming video games. During the program, video game previews, reviews, new gadgets, and trivia facts about the video games are featured.

=== Notable episodes ===
Past episodes have included interviews with film director Uwe Boll, former Nintendo of America President and Chief Operating Officer Reggie Fils-Aimé, professional video gamer Johnathan "Fatal1ty" Wendel, and fashion designer Marc Ecko.

Episodes have also focused on the "Best of E3" in their E3 2006 and E3 2007 episode, featuring editors from internet gaming site GameSpot. Other episodes have featured the Academy of Interactive Arts & Sciences's D.I.C.E. Summit, including an interview with the former head of Microsoft's Interactive Entertainment Business division Peter Moore, the 8th Annual Independent Games Festival, PAX East, and Spike TV Video Game Awards (VGAs).

=== Ratings ===
According to Spike TV, GT.TV is the highest rated video game show on television, and consistently has higher ratings than anything on G4 or MTV2.

== Hosts ==
- Geoff Keighley (2005–2013) - Video game journalist for online, print and television, freelance writer, and executive producer. Former correspondent for G4TV's The Electric Playground.
- Amanda MacKay (2007–2013) - On-location host, actress, and producer.
- Daniel Kayser (2007–2013) - On-location correspondent and interviewer.
- iJustine (2010–2013) - On-location gadget correspondent, and actress.

=== Celebrity guests ===
A number of celebrities have also appeared as guests, including Clint Eastwood, Kiefer Sutherland, Tobey Maguire, Kirsten Dunst, and even Triumph the Insult Comic Dog.

== Game Head: Episode Guide ==
=== Season 1 (2005) ===
- 101 – Frag Dolls profile show
- 102 – The Nintendo Fusion Tour with Fall Out Boy
- 103 – Star Wars: Battlefront II Show, shot at LucasArts/LucasFilm's new office in San Francisco, CA
- 104 – Spike TV Video Game Awards Nomination Special
- 105 – Xbox 360 Launch Special
- 106 – Fight Night Round 3
- 107 – Spike TV Video Game Awards Post-Show
- 108 – University of Southern California Videogame Program Show
- 109 – 1UP/Ziff Davis 2006 Preview Show

=== Season 2 (2006) ===
- 201 – Blur Studios, a 3D animation company
- 202 – The Collective, developer of The Da Vinci Code and Star Wars Episode III: Revenge of the Sith video games
- 203 – Uwe Boll, infamous videogame filmmaker
- 204 – Alex Ward, game designer of Burnout and BLACK
- 205 – Marc Ecko about his game, Marc Ecko's Getting Up: Contents Under Pressure
- 206 – Reggie Fils-Aimé, A profile of Nintendo's top North American executive
- 207 – Academy of Interactive Arts & Sciences's D.I.C.E. Summit
- 208 – EA Los Angeles. This show featured an exclusive preview for Medal of Honor: Airborne
- 209 – Training Day with Johnathan "Fatal1ty" Wendel.
- 210 – The Godfather: The Game Shot at Paramount Pictures backlot in Hollywood, CA
- 211 – NBA Ballers Phenom
- 212 – Kingdom Hearts II
- 213 – The Sundance of Gaming. Shot at the Game Developers Conference in San Jose, CA Features Cliff Bleszinski from Epic Games

=== Season 3 (2006) ===
- 301 – I Am 8 Bit Art Exhibit at Gallery 1988 in Los Angeles, CA
- 302 – Ubisoft Montreal Show shot in Montreal, QC, Canada
- 303 – E3 2006 Special
- 304 – X-Men: The Official Game
- 305 – E3 Game Critics Awards Show
- 306 – Mega64
- 307 – Pandemic Studios
- 308 – Video Games Live Music Concert, shot in Philadelphia, PA
- 309 – Sex and Videogames
- 310 – God of War II
- 311 – The Madden NFL 07 Kickoff Party at the ESPN SportsZone in New York City, NY
- 312 – Resident Evil: Extinction. On the set of the new movie in Mexico City, Mexico
- 313 – San Diego Comic-Con 2006
- 314 – Red vs. Blue from Buda, TX, and the world exclusive look at Command & Conquer 3: Tiberium Wars gameplay
- 315 – QuakeCon 2006.
- 316 – Game On: The History of Videogames
- 317 – The Warped Tour – Thirty Seconds to Mars, Less Than Jake and other bands discuss lending songs to videogames
- 318 – The cast of Family Guy discuss their new video game
- 319 – The PlayStation 3 game Resistance: Fall of Man from Insomniac Games
- 320 – Scarface: The World is Yours in Miami with Steven Bauer (Manny in the film).
- 321 – The Sopranos: Road to Respect with show creator David Chase and actor Vincent Pastore (Big Pussy)
- 322 – Warner Brothers Interactive and Superman Returns: The Game
- 323 – Uwe Boll on the set of his new film Postal
- 324 – Call of Duty 3 Challenge : A reality competition featuring 16 players from across the country in a boot camp environment and won by the former pro gamer "Analog I Muneco".
- 325 – PlayStation 3 launch special
- 326 – Nintendo Wii launch special with Reggie Fils-Aimé
- 327 – 2006 Spike TV Video Game Awards hour-long special

=== Season 4 (2007) ===
During the 2006 Spike TV Video Game Awards on December 13, 2006, a 30-second commercial revealed that Game Head will return for a fourth season in 2007. Commercials stated that new episodes would premiere on Fridays at 1AM in January. However, the first new episode actually aired on Friday, February 2, 2007. The start of season 4 brought with it a new logo and new graphics throughout the show. Other new additions include a ratings score for game reviews, based on a 10-point scale, and a Game Head Icon segment, highlighting an iconic character in video game history. Also, a feature called Open World lists the top-selling games at a given independent video game retailer.

- 401 – 2007 videogame preview show from the offices of IGN in San Francisco, CA (February 2, 2007)
- 402 – Behind the scenes at Sega
- 403 – Madden Bowl 2007 from Miami, FL
- 404 – DICE Convention 2007 with Nintendo, Sony, and Microsoft
- 405 – NBA All-Star Game in Las Vegas
- 406 – Atari founder Nolan Bushnell
- 407 – God of War II Special with David Jaffe
- 408 – Fable creator Peter Molyneux plus a feature on Kotaku
- 409 – Inside Nintendo Power Magazine
- 410 – Alternative Reality Gaming at 42 Entertainment
  - In keeping with the ARG theme, Game Head had a URL and images of Shigeru Miyamoto – hidden in split-second images flashed on the screen – to a trailer for the next episode: a Super Tribute to Shigeru Miyamoto. The link was "miyamoto.spiketv.com"
- 411 – Shigeru Miyamoto: A Super Tribute
- 412 – Inside Valve for Team Fortress 2
- 413 – Halo 3 Multiplayer Beta Special
- 414 – Pirates of the Caribbean: At World's End
- 415 – Big Buck Hunter Pro and Eugene Jarvis
- 416 – A look at Star Wars games at Star Wars Celebration IV
- 417 – Video game modder Ben Heckendorn
- 418 – The Voice of Mario: Charles Martinet
- 419 – Naughty Dog on Uncharted: Drake's Fortune
  - This episode was re-aired in January 2008 with an updated Head Start news segment
- 420 – Gears of War creators Epic Games
- 421 – E3 2007 Special
- 422 – E3 Hangover Special
- 423 – Comic-Con 2007 with David Jaffe, Uwe Boll and the casts of Iron Man and Heroes
- 424 – Madden NFL 08 launch from Times Square
- 425 – Stranglehold special
- 426 – EA Chicago
- 427 – Projekt Revolution Tour 2007
- 428 – EA Summer Showcase
- 429 – Halo 3: LAUNCHED!
- 430 – Hollywood and Games
- 431 – World Cyber Games
- 432 – Call of Duty 4 creators Infinity Ward
- 433 – The writers of The Simpsons
- 434 – E For All Expo 2007
- 435 – Mass Effect at BioWare
- 436 – Harmonix the creators of Rock Band
- 437 – Videogame Violence with Jack Thompson
- 438 – Game Head Best of 2007
- 439 - Game Head: A Mockumentary (Online Short)

== GameTrailers TV (GT.TV) Episode Guide ==
=== Season 1 (2008) ===
In January 2008 it was announced that the 5th season Game Head would be relaunched as GameTrailers TV with Geoff Keighley, further aligning the show with MTV's popular gaming site GameTrailers. The format of the show is largely the same as Game Head, although game reviews are now handled by GameTrailers.com so the scores match those on the website. The show was also re-launched in high-definition on SpikeHD and is available in HD on GameTrailers.com and Xbox Live Marketplace.

- 101 – The world premiere of Tiberium with EA Los Angeles
- 102 – Turok creators Propaganda Games
- 103 – The Most Anticipated Games of 2008
- 104 – Madden Bowl 2008 with Peter Moore
- 105 – D.I.C.E. Summit 2008
- 106 – 2008 Game Developers Conference
- 107 – Iron Man creators Secret Level, Inc.
- 108 – Star Wars: The Force Unleashed Special from LucasArts
- 109 – The Bourne Conspiracy creators High Moon Studios
- 110 – Brothers in Arms: Hell's Highway creators Gearbox Software
- 111 – Ghostbusters: The Video Game creators Terminal Reality
- 112 – Dead Space creators EA Redwood Shores
- 113 – FaceBreaker creators EA Canada
- 114 – Resistance 2 with Insomniac Games
- 115 – The Lord of the Rings: Conquest with Pandemic Studios
- 116 – Prototype with Radical Entertainment
- 117 - Mortal Kombat vs. DC Universe with Midway Games
- 118 – Gears of War 2 with Epic Games
- 119 - E3 2008 Special
- 120 - Comic-Con 2008
- 121 - The Godfather II with Electronic Arts
- 122 - TNA Impact! with TNA wrestlers and Midway Games
- 123 - 2008 Penny Arcade Expo
- 124 - Halo Wars with Ensemble Studios
- 125 - Fallout 3 with Bethesda Game Studios
- 126 - Call of Duty: World at War with Treyarch
- 127 - Skate 2 with EA Canada
- 128 - Wanted: Weapons of Fate with GRIN and F.E.A.R. 2: Project Origin with Monolith Productions
- 129 - 2008 Spike Video Game Awards preview special

=== Season 2 (2009) ===
- 201 - Most Anticipated Games of 2009
- 202 - Grand Theft Auto IV: The Lost and Damned with Rockstar Games
- 203 - inFamous with Sucker Punch Productions
- 204 - D.I.C.E. Summit 2009
- 205 - Alpha Protocol with Obsidian Entertainment
- 206 - Wolfenstein with Raven Software
- 207 - BioWare special
- 208 - 2009 Game Developers Conference
- 209 - Fight Night Round 4 with Electronic Arts
- 210 - Mafia II with 2K Games
- 211 - Army of Two: The 40th Day with EA Montreal
- 212 - Tony Hawk: Ride with Robomodo
- 213 - Heavy Rain with Quantic Dream
- 214 - E3 2009 Preview
- 215 - E3 2009
- 216 - Dante's Inferno with Visceral Games
- 217 - Uncharted 2: Among Thieves with Naughty Dog
- 218 - Brütal Legend with Double Fine Productions
- 219 - Comic-Con 2009
- 220 - Valve special
- 221 - Halo 3: ODST with Bungie
- 222 - LucasArts special
- 223 - Ratchet & Clank Future: A Crack in Time with Insomniac Games
- 224 - Call of Duty: Modern Warfare 2 with Infinity Ward
- 225 - Grand Theft Auto: The Ballad of Gay Tony with Rockstar North
- 226 - BioShock 2 with 2K Marin
- 227 - Nintendo special
- 228 - Mass Effect 2 with BioWare

=== Season 3 (2010) ===
- 301 - Battlefield: Bad Company 2 (January 21, 2010)
- 302 - Most Anticipated Games 2010 (January 28, 2010)
- 303 - Splinter Cell Conviction (February 11, 2010)
- 304 - X10 Convention (February 18, 2010)
- 305 - God of War III (February 25, 2010)
- 306 - TBA (March 5, 2010)
- 307 - TBA (March 12, 2010)
- 308 - GDC 2010 (March 19, 2010)
- 309 - Halo: Reach (April 4, 2010)
- 310 - Red Dead Redemption (May 8, 2010)
- 311 - TBA (May 15, 2010)
- 312 - Spiderman: Shattered Dimensions (May 22, 2010)
- 313 - Bulletstorm (May 29, 2010)
- 314 - Crysis 2 (June 5, 2010)
- 315 - TBA (June 12, 2010)
- 316 - The Big 3 at E3 (June 18, 2010)
- 317 - Deadliest Warrior (July 3, 2010)
- 318 - God of War III/Fallout: New Vegas (July 24, 2010)
- 319 - Comic Con 2010 (July 31, 2010)
- 320 - TBA (August 14, 2010)
- 321 - Portal 2 (August 21, 2010)
- 322 - Halo: Reach/Bungie (August 28, 2010)
- 323 - Dead Space 2 (September 11, 2010)
- 324 - Star Wars: The Force Unleashed 2 (September 18, 2010)
- 325 - Epic Mickey (September 25, 2010)
- 326 - Call of Duty: Black Ops (October 15, 2010)
- 327 - Rock Band 3 (October 22, 2010)
- 328 - Mortal Kombat (October 29, 2010)
- 329 - Fall Games Preview (November 5, 2010)
- 330 - Back to the Future: The Game (December 3, 2010)
- 331 - 2010 VGA Preview (December 10, 2010)

=== Season 4 (2011) ===
- 401 - Fight Night Champion/Twisted Metal (January 29, 2011)
- 402 - Nintendo 3DS (February 4, 2011)
- 403 - Duke Nukem Forever/Madden Bowl 2011 (February 11, 2011)
- 404 - Infamous 2/SOCOM 4 (February 24, 2011)
- 405 - GDC 2011 Special (March 3, 2011)
- 406 - Rage (March 8, 2011)
- 407 - PAX East (March 11, 2011)
- 408 - L.A. Noire/Twisted Metal (April 15, 2011)
- 409 - Elder Scrolls V: Skyrim/Uncharted 3: Drake's Deception (April 22, 2011)
- 410 - Sony Surprise: Starhawk/Madden NFL 12 (Top 5 Most Anticipated Games at E3) (May 13, 2011)
- 411 - Countdown to E3 2011 (May 26, 2011)
- 412 - E3 First Look (Exclusive E3 2011 Trailers) (June 3, 2011)

Special - GT.TV Presents: E3 2011 All Access Live (June 6, 2011)

- 413 - BioShock Infinite (15 minute trailer from E3) (July 8, 2011)
- 414 - Resistance 3 (July 22, 2011)
- 415 - Comic-Con 2011: Saint's Row: The Third/Mass Effect 3/Batman: Arkham City (July 29, 2011)
- 416 - Saints Row: The Third (August 12, 2011)
- 417 - Gears of War 3 (August 19, 2011)
- 418 - Fall Preview/GamesCon/Kotaku.com (August 26, 2011)
- 419 - NBA 2K12/PAX '11 (September 2, 2011)
- 420 - Assassin's Creed: Revelations (September 9, 2011)
- 421 - Batman: Arkham City (September 16, 2011)

Special - GameStop All Access (Battlefield 3/Assassin's Creed: Revelations/Uncharted 3: Drake's Deception/Batman: Arkham City) (September 16, 2011)

- 422 - Aliens & Syndicate (Aliens: Colonial Marines/Syndicate) (September 30, 2011)

=== Season 5 (2012) ===
- 501 - Battlefield 3 (October 7, 2011)
- 502 - Call of Duty: Modern Warfare 3 (October 14, 2011)
- 503 - Elder Scrolls V: Skyrim (October 21, 2011)
- 504 - Nintendo Exclusives (w/ Reggie Fils-Aimé) (The Legend of Zelda: Skyward Sword) (October 28, 2011)
- 505 - The Simpsons E3 Parody/Spike Video Game Awards Nominees (November 11, 2011)
- 506 - GameStop Unwrapped (The biggest games of the season)/World Premiere DLC (November 25, 2011)
- 507 - VGA Games of the Year (Spike's VGA nominees of the year) (December 9, 2011)
- 508 - Mass Effect 3/CES 2012 (January 20, 2012)
- 509 - Spring Preview: Madden Bowl 2012/Starhawk/MLB 12: The Show/Darksiders II/Syndicate (February 10, 2012)
- 510 - DICE Summit2012/Transformers: Fall of Cybertron/Sleeping Dogs (February 17, 2012)
- 511 - Xbox 360 Spring Showcase/Halo 4/Forza Horizon (March 9, 2012)
- 512 - GDC 2012 (San Francisco Game Developer's Conference)/Tony Hawk's Pro Skater HD/Bellator: MMA Onslaught (March 16, 2012)
- 513 - Junction Point Studio Visit: Disney's Epic Mickey 2: The Power of Two (March 23, 2012)
- 514 - FreddieW (April 6, 2012)
- 515 - Medal of Honor: Warfighter (April 13, 2012)
- 516 - PlayStation 3 Exclusive Game: PlayStation All-Stars Battle Royale (April 27, 2012)
- Special - GT.TV presents Max Payne 3 (May 4, 2012)
- 517 - Transformers Fall of Cybertron (May 11, 2012)
- 518 - Far Cry 3 (May 18, 2012)
- 519 - E3 2012 First Look Special (Star Wars: 1313/Guardians of Middle-earth/Metal Gear Rising: Revengeance/Castlevania: Lords of Shadow 2/Dishonored/Tomb Raider) (May 31, 2012)
- 520 - Epic Games (June 8, 2012)
- 521 - Dead Space 3 (June 15, 2012)
- 522 - Tomb Raider (June 22, 2012)
- 523 - Borderlands 2/Vid Con 2012 (July 13, 2012)
- 524 - Dishonored (August 3, 2012)
- 525 - Valve (Dota 2/Source Film Maker/Steam/QuakeCon) (August 17, 2012)
- 526 - Media Molecule/Forza Horizon (September 7, 2012)
- 527 - Fuse (September 14, 2012)
- 528 - Halo 4 (September 21, 2012)
- 529 - Assassin's Creed III (September 28, 2012)

=== Season 6 (2013) ===
- 601 - Need For Speed: Most Wanted and Medal of Honor: Warfighter (October 5, 2012)
- 602 - Call of Duty: Black Ops 2 (October 12, 2012)
- 603 - God of War: Ascension (November 9, 2012)
- 604 - VGA 10 Nomination Special (December 7, 2012)
- 605 - CES 2013 (January 18, 2013)
- 606 - Star Trek/Star Wars Pinball (February 22, 2013)
- 607 - South by Southwest/Metal Gear Solid V: The Phantom Pain (March 15, 2013)
- 608 - GDC 2013/Battlefield 4 (April 12, 2013)
- 609 - Behind the Scenes: Microsoft Xbox One (May 24, 2013)
- 610 - Pre-E3 2013 Countdown (Dying Light/Yaiba: Ninja Gaiden Z) (June 7, 2013)
- 612 - Penny Arcade Expo 2013 (PAX) (September 13, 2013)

=== Season 7 (2013) ===
- 701 - Killzone: Shadow Fall/Batman: Arkham Origins (October 18, 2013)
- 702 - Xbox & Nintendo Fall Preview (November 7, 2013)
- Special - PS4 All Access: Greatness Awaits (Special) (November 14, 2013)
- Special - Xbox One: Day One Countdown (Special) (November 21, 2013)
- 703 - Donkey Kong Country: Tropical Freeze (November 22, 2013)
