= TwitchCon =

Video gaming convention

- Logo used for TwitchCon 2025, commemorating their 10th Anniversary
- Status: Active
- Genre: Livestreaming, entertainment, esports, internet culture
- Frequency: Annual
- Location: San Diego (North America) (Until 2028) Berlin (Europe)
- Inaugurated: North America (San Francisco); September 25, 2015; 11 years ago Europe (Berlin); April 13, 2019; 7 years ago
- Most recent: San Diego; November 15, 2026; 2 days ago
- Next event: Berlin; May 22, 2027; 6 months' time
- Attendance: 23,000 (San Diego, 2024); 11,500 (Rotterdam, 2024)
- Organizer: Twitch Interactive
- Sponsors: San Diego 2026 – Audible, e.l.f. Cosmetics, JLab, Prime Video, REESE'S, Southwest Airlines
- Website: www.twitchcon.com

TwitchCon is an annual convention for the video livestreaming service Twitch. It is organized by Twitch Interactive and focuses on the culture of livestreaming, entertainment, esports and internet culture. TwitchCon is open to industry professionals, streamers, and fans; the convention allows community members to meet streamers, discover new products, and try out upcoming games.

The first convention was held in 2015 in San Francisco at the Moscone Center. In 2019, the first European convention was held in Berlin at the CityCube. TwitchCon is hosted twice a year, in North America for three days and in Europe for two days. All North American conventions are held in California, except for 2023, in which the event was held in Las Vegas, Nevada. The North American convention is most frequently hosted in San Diego at the San Diego Convention Center. The European conventions have been held in Berlin, Paris, and most commonly the Netherlands and will return to Berlin in 2027.

== TwitchCon North America ==
=== 2015: San Francisco ===
The inaugural TwitchCon was held at the Moscone Center in San Francisco on September 25 and 26, 2015. The event was organized by Twitch, and featured a keynote by Twitch CEO Emmett Shear. All of the convention's panels were livestreamed on Twitch.

=== 2016: San Diego ===
In 2016, the convention was moved to the San Diego Convention Center and expanded to a three-day annual event, taking place from September 30 to October 2. This TwitchCon introduced sponsors such as Xbox, Truth, and Amazon Game Studios.

=== 2017: Long Beach ===
In 2017, TwitchCon took place at the Long Beach Convention Center in Long Beach, California from October 20–22. This included the first esports tournaments to be held at TwitchCon: H1Z1 Arena, Lineage 2: Revolution 30 vs 30 Fortress Siege Showcase, and Power Rangers: Legacy Wars Showdown.

=== 2018: San Jose ===
TwitchCon 2018 took place at the McEnery Convention Center in San Jose, California from October 26–28, 2018. The main presentation was held on the first day of the event by djWHEAT, director of Twitch studios, who made numerous statements about forthcoming features for the platform. Twitch Speaks, a speaking series first presented at TwitchCon 2018, featured Tony Hawk, Kevin Smith, Felicia Day, Emmett Shear, and Ninja. The Fall Skirmish final, a competitive Fortnite tournament final, was held at TwitchCon 2018, at the time making it the second largest Fortnite LAN event held.

=== 2019: San Diego ===
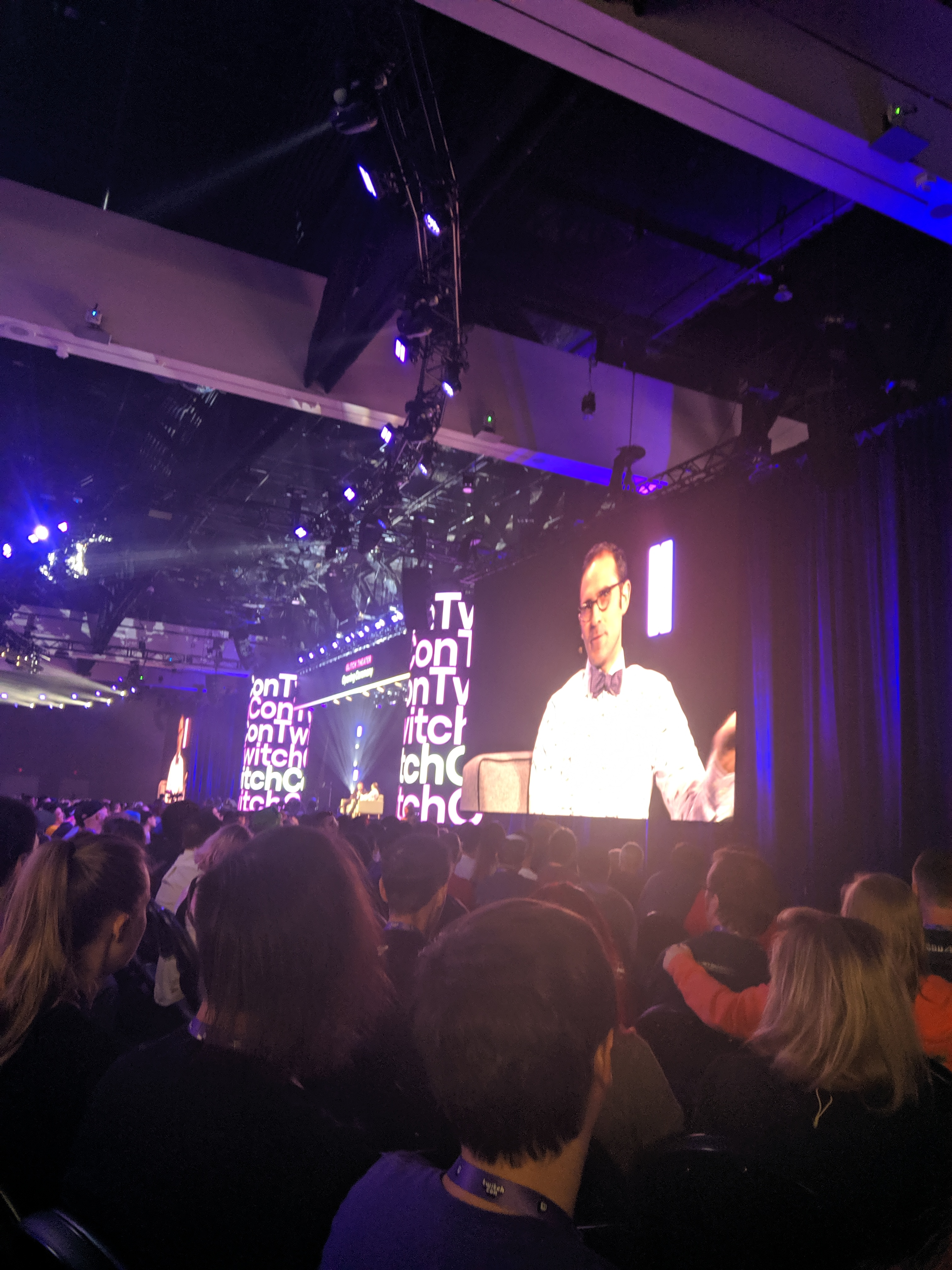
Emmett Shear at TwitchCon 2019 opening ceremony in San Diego

TwitchCon North America returned to San Diego, taking place from September 27–29, 2019. It introduced the debut of an updated Twitch logo, TwitchCon logo, and brand design. This was the second time the event had been held in San Diego, with the first being held in 2016. This was also the first time a TwitchCon event was held at a venue more than one time.

=== 2020 and 2021 cancellation ===
Due to the COVID-19 pandemic, TwitchCon North America, which was scheduled to occur at the San Diego Convention Center between September 25 and 27, 2020, as well as TwitchCon 2021, was canceled. On November 14, 2020, in lieu of TwitchCon, Twitch held a 12-hour virtual convention named "GlitchCon". Over 425 streamers participated in the event. Notable activities included Twitch Rivals tournaments for Fortnite and Fall Guys, the Austin Talent Show featuring judges T-Pain and Andy Milonakis, and a US$1 million donation being made to the AbleGamers Foundation.

=== 2022: San Diego ===
TwitchCon North America 2022 took place at the San Diego Convention Center from October 7–9 since 2019. This was the third time the event has been held in San Diego. The events required face coverings and had numerous COVID-19 prevention protocols in place.

The TwitchCon San Diego party was held at Petco Park, and featured the artists Meet Me at The Altar, Kim Petras, and Megan Thee Stallion. The party gained significant media attention when an attendee cosplaying as Master Chief from the Halo series of video games was allowed on stage during a performance with Megan Thee Stallion.

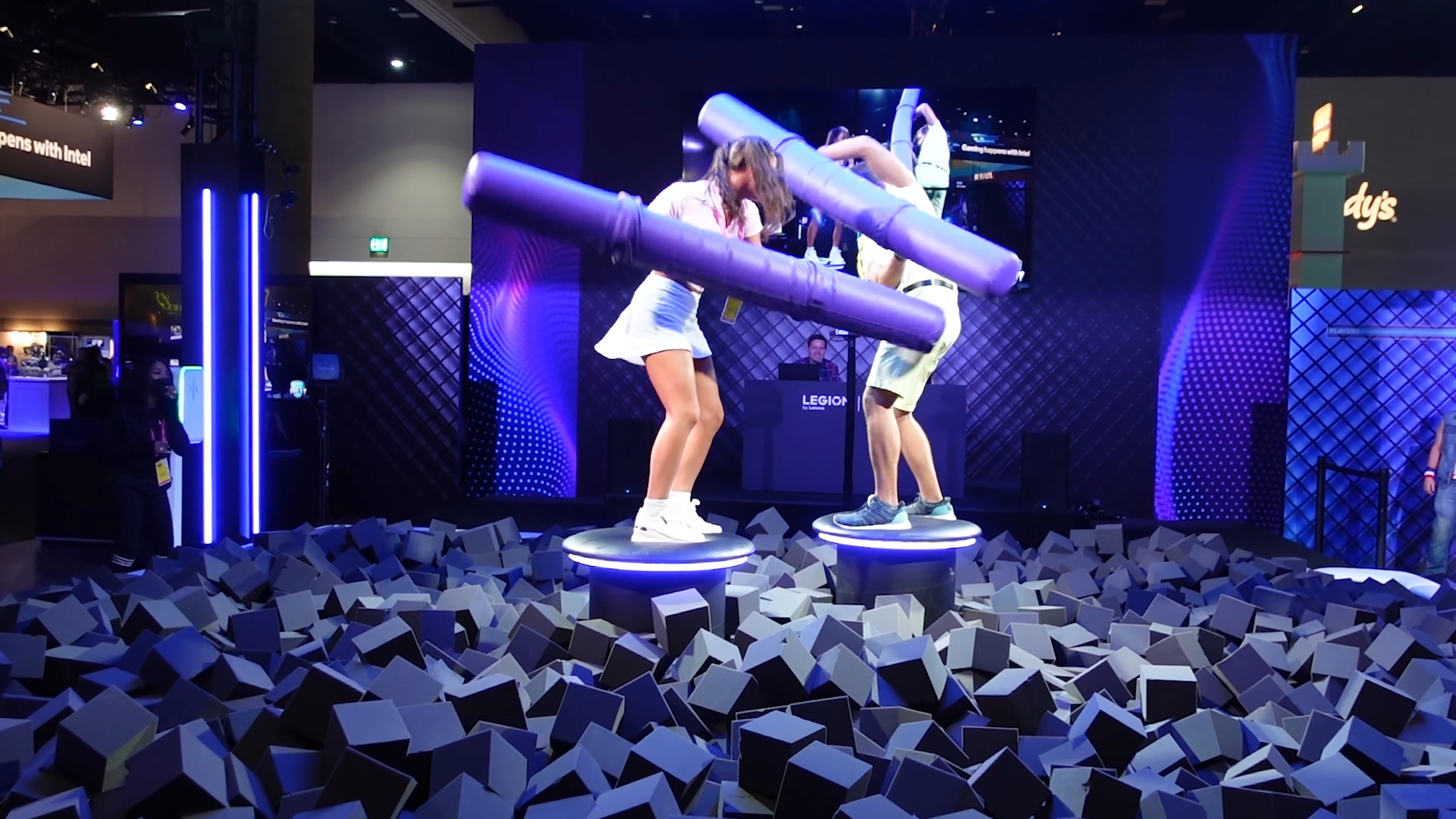
The foam pit at TwitchCon San Diego 2022

However, many people were critical of the San Diego event. One of the more notable criticisms of the event was the lack of security protocols in place for exhibitors, resulting in overcrowded venues and reported stalking incidents. Legion by Lenovo and Intel hosted an interactive exhibit that involved attendees dueling in an arena using large padded instruments and landing in a pit of foam cubes. However, the arena was not padded properly, with two feet of foam cubes resting on a concrete floor, causing people to land with significant force, resulting in various injuries.

Actress and Twitch Streamer Adriana Chechik reported that she had broken her back in several places after landing, and she had to undergo surgery to set the fracture with a rod implant, as well as terminate her newly discovered pregnancy. Lenovo and Intel both remained silent on the matter. Chechik posted on social media that neither Intel, Lenovo, or Twitch had contacted her directly about the incident.

At TwitchCon 2022, Twitch did not announce a location for the next TwitchCon event during the closing ceremony, breaking the years-old tradition.

=== 2023: Las Vegas ===
TwitchCon North America 2023 took place at the Las Vegas Convention Center in Las Vegas, Nevada, on October 20–22, marking the first time the event was hosted outside of California. With over 30,000 attendees, the event featured key platform updates, including new collaboration tools, expanded emote slots, and enhanced safety measures like chat warnings and policies against doxxing and swatting. Panels, meet-and-greets, and product demos from brands like Elgato and Corsair added to the interactive experience, making it a memorable event for the streaming community.

=== 2024: San Diego ===
TwitchCon North America made its return to the San Diego Convention Center in California from September 20–22, 2024, marking its first time back in San Diego since 2022. The opening ceremony was kicked off by Mary Kish, Twitch's Director of Community Marketing. As part of the ceremony, Twitch announced a $100,000 donation to Alveus Sanctuary, which was received by its founder, Twitch Streamer Maya Higa. Additionally, Twitch revealed the dates for the following year's event, reviving the tradition of announcing future TwitchCon dates during the convention for the first time since 2022.

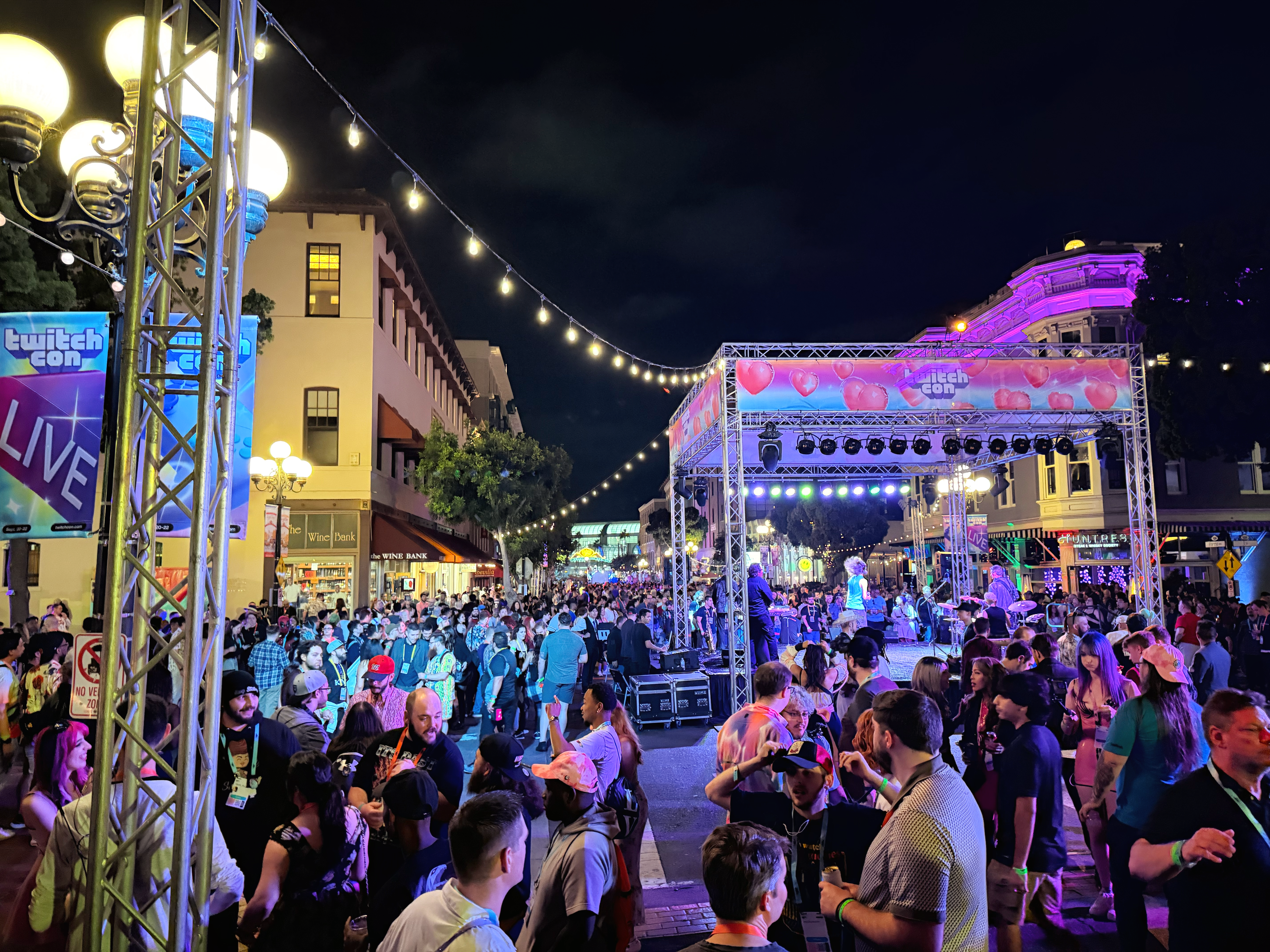
Photo of the main stage at the Block Party at the Gaslamp Quarter in San Diego

The event also featured popular shows and activities, including The Table ft. QTCinderella, Name Your Price LIVE! ft. AustinShow & WillNeff, and the classic Twitch Rivals Ultimate Challenge, among many others.

TwitchCon 2024 was also the first year in which Twitch did not offer a concert event. In place, Twitch offered attendees a "Block Party" add-on to the TwitchCon pass. The Block Party allowed attendees access to a blocked-off section of the Gaslamp Quarter in San Diego from 7 to 10 PM on September 21. Twitch partnered with local businesses to offer free food, drinks, and alcoholic beverages to attendees of the event, as well as live music, karaoke sessions, and lounge areas.

=== 2025: San Diego ===
TwitchCon North America returned to the San Diego Convention Center on October 17–19, 2025. The event marked 10 years of TwitchCon.

Prior to the event, several major creators publicly opted out of attending the event, citing safety concerns. During the event, Twitch streamer Emiru was assaulted by a fan, who grabbed her and attempted to kiss her before her personal security intervened. Twitch responded by stating that the company "immediately blocked this individual from returning to the TwitchCon premises", which Emiru denied, calling the statement a "blatant lie". Twitch initially planned to suspend the person from the platform for 30 days, and then indefinitely only after Emiru pushed back. She stated that the fan was allowed to walk away after his attempted assault and was only caught hours after the incident. Furthermore, she commented that she felt TwitchCon staff did not take the assault seriously and noted that Twitch had banned her preferred bodyguard in a previous TwitchCon for "holding a stalker’s arm to bring him to police".

=== 2026: San Diego ===
TwitchCon North America returned to the San Diego Convention Center on November 13–15, 2026.

=== 2027: San Diego ===
TwitchCon North America will return to the San Diego Convention Center on October 8–10, 2027.

== TwitchCon Europe ==
=== 2019: Berlin ===
The inaugural TwitchCon Europe took place at CityCube Berlin in Germany on April 13 and 14, 2019. It featured panels, workshops, and competitions like Twitch Rivals. Notable announcements included Twitch Sings, improved search features, and expanded monetization for creators. American actor David Hasselhoff appeared as a motivational speaker. Attendees had to be over 18 to enter the event.

=== 2020 and 2021 cancellation ===
Due to the COVID-19 pandemic, TwitchCon Europe, which was scheduled to occur at RAI Amsterdam Convention Centre May 2 and 3, 2020, as well as TwitchCon Europe 2021, was cancelled. On November 14, 2020, in lieu of TwitchCon, Twitch held a 12-hour virtual convention named "GlitchCon". Over 425 streamers participated in the event. Notable activities included Twitch Rivals tournaments for Fortnite and Fall Guys, the Austin Talent Show featuring judges T-Pain and Andy Milonakis, and a US$1 million donation being made to the AbleGamers foundation.

=== 2022: Amsterdam ===
TwitchCon Europe 2022 took place on July 16 and 17 in Amsterdam at the RAI Amsterdam Convention Centre, attracting over 14,500 attendees. It was the first TwitchCon since the COVID-19 pandemic forced a two-year hiatus. The event featured various activities, including an opening ceremony with former Twitch CEO Emmett Shear, the inaugural TwitchCon Drag Showcase, and the "Fems Presents Monkey Cage" obstacle course inspired by a classic Dutch game. A cosplay contest showcased European talent, while the interactive challenge "Don't Wake Nanny" had teams competing to build the tallest toy tower without waking a lurking nanny. The event concluded with a ceremony celebrating the weekend's highlights.

=== 2023: Paris ===
TwitchCon Europe 2023 was held on July 8 and 9 at the Paris Expo Porte de Versailles in Paris. The event brought together streamers, fans, and industry professionals for an array of panels, workshops, and cosplay competitions. Multiple booths included subjects such as content creation, mental health, and VTubers, while the cosplay contest was a big success with cosplayers showcasing their costumes. from video games and anime. The event also offered networking opportunities, allowing fans to meet their favorite streamers and connect with others in the Twitch community.

=== 2024: Rotterdam ===
TwitchCon Europe 2024 was the first held at the Rotterdam Ahoy in Rotterdam, Netherlands, with over 11,500 attendees on June 29 and 30, 2024. The event marked the second time the event has been hosted in the Netherlands, previously being held in Amsterdam in 2022. At TwitchCon Europe 2024's opening ceremony, Director of Community Marketing Mary Kish and CEO Dan Clancy introduced three 'bleed purple' themed trophies awarded for achieving 5 million, 50 million, and 250 million hours of watchtime. The first trophy, for 5 million hours, was presented to /LittleBigWhale at the event, marking a new way to celebrate streamer milestones. An afterparty, featuring Clancy, hosted by the Twitch music community raised over $2,500 for the Make-A-Wish Foundation.

=== 2025: Rotterdam ===
TwitchCon Europe 2025 took place on May 31 and June 1, 2025, at Rotterdam Ahoy in Rotterdam, Netherlands. It marked the second consecutive year that the European convention was hosted in Rotterdam and formed part of TwitchCon's 10th anniversary celebrations. The event brought together streamers, content creators, and fans from across Europe and beyond for a two-day convention featuring gaming competitions, live entertainment, panel discussions, workshops, and meet-and-greet sessions.

The opening ceremony was once again hosted by Twitch's Director of Community Marketing, Mary Kish, and CEO Dan Clancy. The convention featured several major sponsors and partners, including Streamlabs, Logitech G, Nubia, Bandai Namco Entertainment, and Philips OneBlade. Streamlabs sponsored the Streamer Station, where attendees could explore streaming equipment and software, while Nubia served as an official partner of Twitch Rivals.

The event also featured the Twitch Rivals Arena, a dedicated LAN gaming area, the Artist Alley, and the Loot Cave, where attendees could purchase official TwitchCon merchandise. Additional activities included creator workshops, community gatherings, and opportunities for attendees to interact with their favorite streamers.

=== 2026: Rotterdam ===
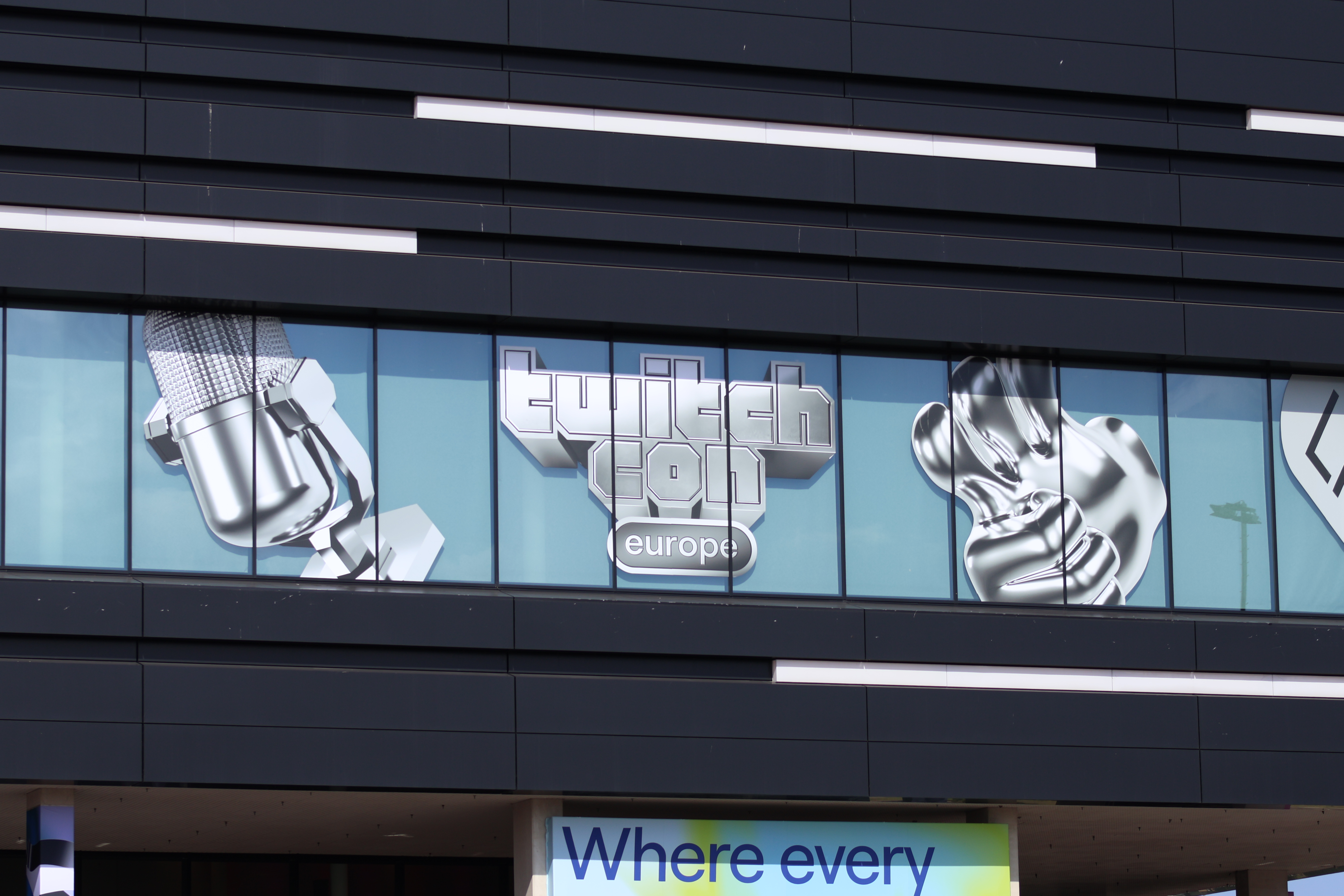
TwitchCon Europe 2026 banner at Rotterdam Ahoy

TwitchCon Europe 2026 took place on May 30 and 31, 2026, at Rotterdam Ahoy in Rotterdam, Netherlands. The event brought together Twitch streamers, content creators, and fans from across Europe and beyond for a two-day convention celebrating the Twitch community. The convention featured meet-and-greet opportunities, interactive activities, gaming experiences, panel discussions, and live entertainment. Attendees had the opportunity to meet their favorite streamers, connect with fellow community members, and participate in various creator-focused activities

=== 2027: Berlin ===
TwitchCon Europe 2027 will take place in Berlin, Germany on May 22 and 23, 2027. It will mark the first TwitchCon Europe event in Berlin since its inception in 2019. The location has yet to be announced.

== Locations and dates ==
=== North America ===
№	Dates	Venue	City	Attendance
1	September 25–26, 2015	Moscone Center	San Francisco, California	20,000
2	September 30 – October 2, 2016	San Diego Convention Center	San Diego, California	35,000
3	October 20–22, 2017	Long Beach Convention and Entertainment Center	Long Beach, California	50,000
4	October 26–28, 2018	San Jose Convention Center	San Jose, California	30,000
5	September 27–29, 2019	San Diego Convention Center	San Diego, California	28,000
—N/a	September 25–27, 2020 (planned) (Note: Canceled due to the COVID-19 pandemic; GlitchCon takes place instead)	San Diego Convention Center	San Diego, California	—N/a
6	October 7–9, 2022	San Diego Convention Center	San Diego, California	30,000
7	October 20–22, 2023	Las Vegas Convention Center	Winchester, Nevada	30,000
8	September 20–22, 2024	San Diego Convention Center	San Diego, California	23,000
9	October 17–19, 2025	San Diego Convention Center	San Diego, California	TBA
10	November 13–15, 2026	San Diego Convention Center	San Diego, California	TBA
11	October 8–10, 2027	San Diego Convention Center	San Diego, California	TBD

=== Europe ===
№	Dates	Venue	City	Attendance
1	April 13–14, 2019	CityCube Berlin	Berlin, Germany	9,500
—N/a	May 2–3, 2020 (planned)	RAI Amsterdam Convention Centre	Amsterdam, Netherlands	—N/a
2	July 16–17, 2022	RAI Amsterdam Convention Centre	Amsterdam, Netherlands	14,500
3	July 8–9, 2023	Paris Expo Porte de Versailles	Paris, France	10,000
4	June 29–30, 2024	Rotterdam Ahoy	Rotterdam, Netherlands	11,500
5	May 31–June 1, 2025	Rotterdam Ahoy	Rotterdam, Netherlands	TBA
6	May 30–31, 2026	Rotterdam Ahoy	Rotterdam, Netherlands	TBA
7	May 22–23, 2027	Messe Berlin	Berlin, Germany	TBD

== See also ==
- VidCon
- BlizzCon
