= Will Neff =

American Twitch streamer and YouTuber (born 1989)

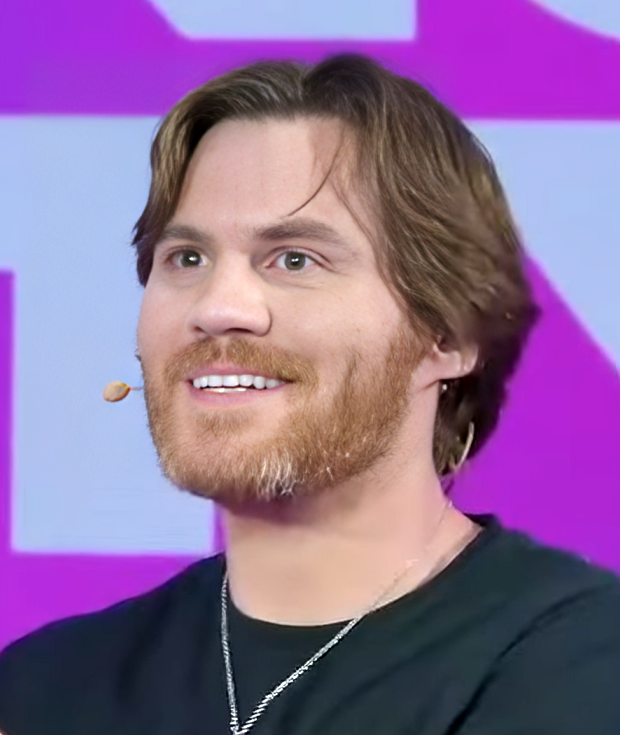
- Neff in 2023
- Born: William Savidge Ebers Neff; September 14, 1989 (age 37); United States
- Education: Elon University (MA)
- Occupations: Twitch streamer; YouTuber

Twitch information
- Channel: willneff
- Years active: 2016–present
- Genres: Gaming; Just Chatting
- Games: Plays Many, including, "Just Chatting"
- Followers: 564 thousand

YouTube information
- Channel: Will Neff
- Years active: 2020–present
- Genre: Gaming
- Subscribers: 144 thousand
- Views: 19.14 million
- Last updated: December 19, 2025
- Website: willneff.store

William Savidge Ebers Neff (born September 14, 1989) is an American Twitch streamer, YouTuber, and actor. He is the co-host of the game show Name Your Price, alongside fellow Twitch streamer AustinShow. He is also a co-host of the Fear& podcast.

== Early life ==
William Savidge Ebers Neff was born on September 14, 1989. Through one of his grandfathers, he is of German descent. His father, Robert Arthur Neff, is a retired business and financial executive.

Neff attended high school at Blair Academy, a boarding and day prep school in Blairstown, New Jersey, where he was captain of the squash team. He graduated with a master's degree in game and interactive media design from Elon University in Elon, North Carolina. During his studies, Neff interned at both Second City in Chicago (2008) and Laugh Factory in Los Angeles (2012). Previously, he honed his improv skills at The Groundlings, a theater and improv club. Neff also previously worked as a narrative-focused video producer for BuzzFeed, an American internet media company.

== Career ==
=== Streaming ===
Neff created his Twitch channel in April 2016 but did not begin streaming until August 2018, where he primarily streamed League of Legends gameplay. In May 2020, he created his YouTube channel, where he uploads highlights from his Twitch streams.

Neff's online popularity surged in 2020, which he attributes to the COVID-19 lockdowns. He is known for his collaborative streams with fellow Twitch streamers Hasan Piker, AustinShow, and QTCinderella.

On May 5, 2021, Neff received a two-day Twitch ban for watching a clip of Samurai Jack on Adult Swim's official YouTube channel. In November 2021, he joined 100 Thieves, a Los Angeles-based gaming organization, as a content creator. Neff signed with content organization One True King in 2024.

On April 27, 2023, Neff participated in Esfand's Draft Day Extravaganza, a football event to coincide with the first day of the NFL draft. He would return the following year for coverage of the 2024 NFL draft.

On February 5, 2024, One True King, an American media organization based in Austin, Texas, announced that Neff would be joining the organization as a content creator. Neff would also be appearing in and hosting several shows created with the organization, including the OTK Film Festival in March 2024. On September 26, 2024, Neff received a two-day Twitch ban for streaming The Shawshank Redemption during his "film school" sessions.

On May 30, 2025, Neff announced on Twitter that he would be leaving One True King.

=== Fear& ===
Neff hosts the weekly Fear& podcast with fellow streamers Hasan Piker, QTCinderella, and AustinShow. Neff and Piker created the podcast on May 6, 2021, with QTCinderella and AustinShow officially joining as full time co-hosts on October 24, 2022. The podcast mainly covers pop culture and political events and occasionally hosts guests. Originally named Fear & Malding, the name of the podcast is a reference to Hunter S. Thompson's books Fear and Loathing in Las Vegas and Fear and Loathing on the Campaign Trail '72.

=== Attack of the Show! ===
Neff was one of the hosts of the G4TV program Attack of the Show!, an American television program focused on pop culture, video games, and movies, after it was relaunched in November 2021. Neff said that being a fan of G4 growing up was one of the reasons he joined as one of the program hosts. The show was discontinued a year later, after Comcast announced the disbandment of G4TV due to financial problems.

=== Name Your Price ===
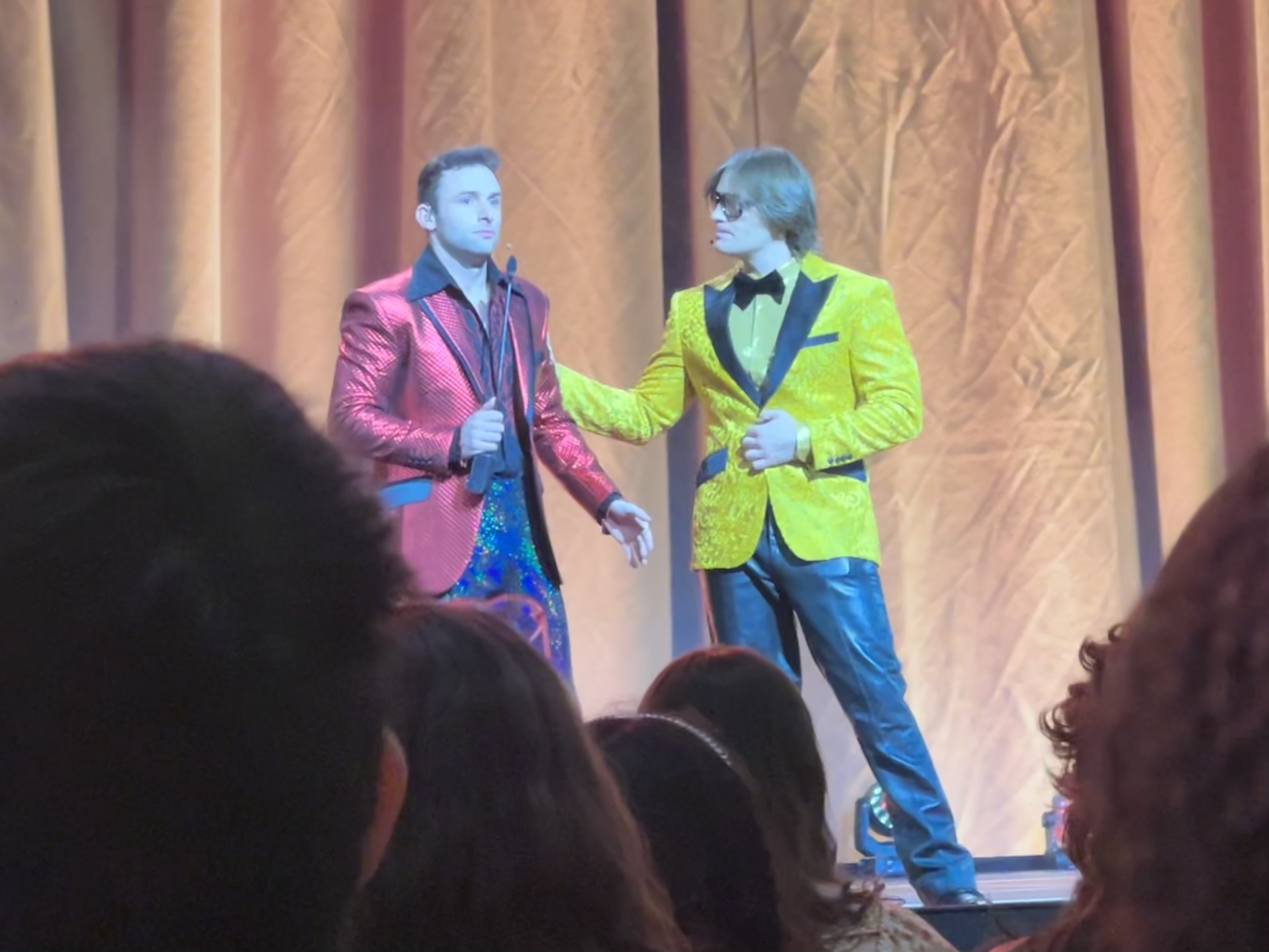
Neff and AustinShow during Name Your Price live show at TwitchCon Las Vegas 2023.

On February 10, 2022, Neff joined fellow Twitch streamer AustinShow as a co-host for Name Your Price, a 1970s-themed game show inspired by The Price Is Right. The show aired on AustinShow's Twitch channel for two seasons before its cancellation due to the closure of G4 in October 2022. In March 2023, following AustinShow's signing with Misfits Gaming, the show's revival was announced.

On October 9, 2023, Name Your Price returned for a third season, adopting a touring format for the first time. Episodes feature live audiences in Miami, Las Vegas (TwitchCon), Houston, and Long Beach. Each episode retains AustinShow and Neff as co-hosts, joined by various prominent streamers as contestants, product presenters, and guests.

On February 17, 2024, Neff and AustinShow were awarded the "Best Streamed Series" award for Name Your Price at The Streamer Awards.

=== Hey, Donna! ===
On August 8, 2022, Neff announced a new G4TV comedy series called Hey, Donna! with co-host and fellow Twitch streamer QTCinderella. The show blended scripted and unscripted elements, featuring improvised advice and banter interspersed with occasional scripted segments. The show was discontinued on October 16, 2022, after Comcast announced the disbandment of G4TV.

== Other ventures ==
=== Acting ===
Neff appeared in the music video for eaJ's "Car Crash" with fellow 100 Thieves members Kyedae and Valkyrae. Later in 2023, he appeared in the music video for Lovejoy's "Portrait of a Blank Slate". He appeared in the 2024 comedy-romance movie Peak Season, written and directed by Henry Loevner and Steven Kanter. In May 2025, he appeared in the music video for Bbno$'s "mary poppins".

== Personal life ==
Neff is dating fellow streamer and actress Caroline Kwan. They currently reside in California.

He has been diagnosed with ADHD. He is a fan of the New York Jets.

== Awards and nominations ==
Year	Ceremony	Category	Work	Result	Ref.
2022	The Streamer Awards	League of Their Own	Himself	Nominated	
2023	The Streamer Awards	Best Just Chatting Streamer	Himself	Nominated	
2023	The Streamer Awards	Best Streamed Series	Name Your Price	Won	
2026	The Streamer Awards	Best Roleplay Streamer	Himself	Pending	

== Filmography ==
Film
Year	Title	Role	Ref.
2024	Peak Season	Josh	

Music videos
Year	Title	Artist(s)	Ref.
2022	"Car Crash"	eaJ	
2023	"Portrait of a Blank Slate"	Lovejoy	
2025	"mary poppins"	Bbno$	
2025	"1-800"	Bbno$ & Ironmouse	Youtube video
