= Anna David (academic) =

British obstetrician

Anna Louise Marie David
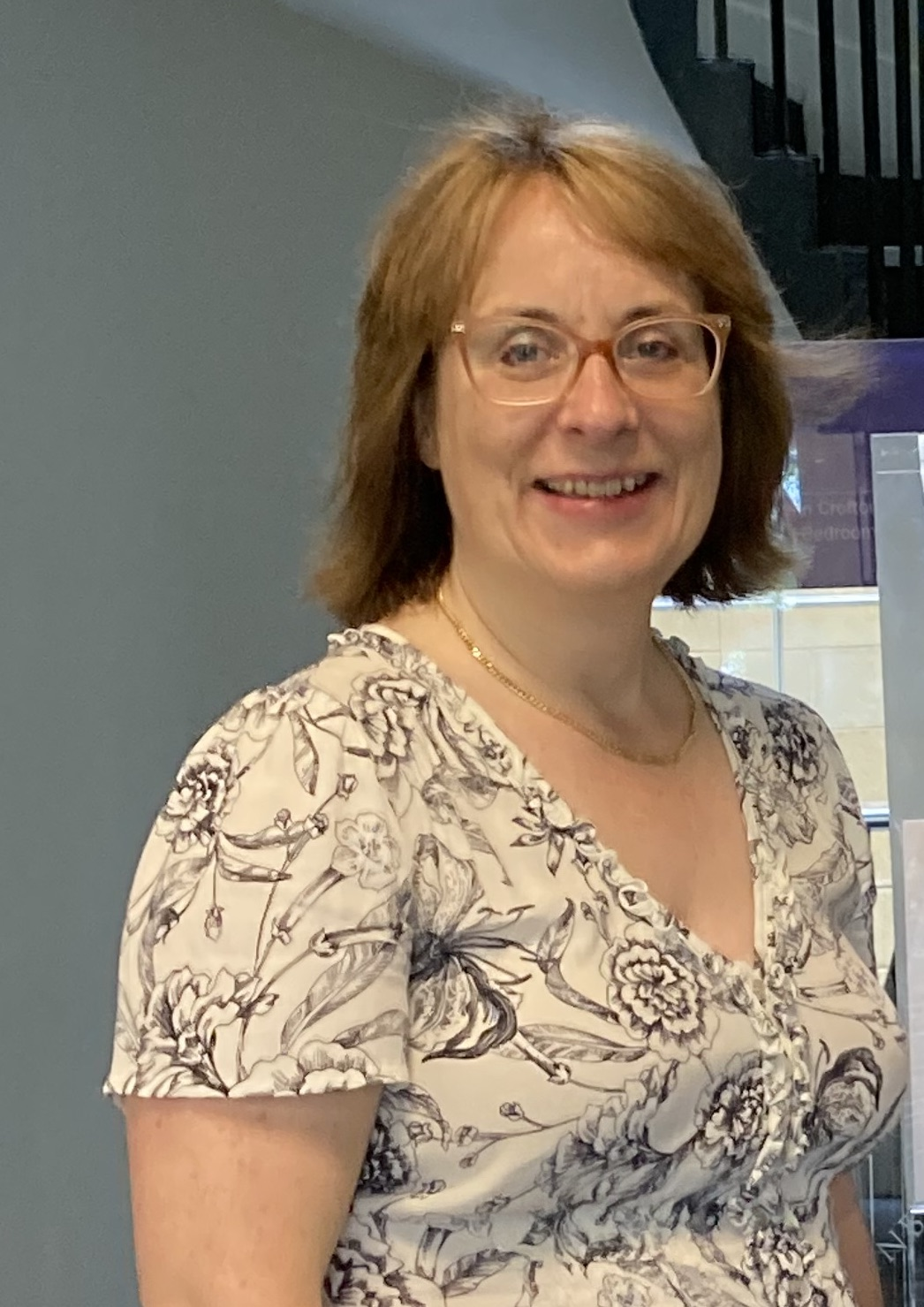
- Education: University of St Andrews; University of Manchester; University College London; North West Thames Deanery
- Scientific career
- Workplaces: University College London
- Thesis: Development of ultrasound-guided gene therapy to the sheep fetus (2006)

Anna Louise Marie David is a British obstetrician who is Professor of Obstetrics and Maternal Fetal Medicine and Director of the Elizabeth Garrett Anderson Institute for Women's Health at University College London. She is a leader in prenatal therapy and led the team that performed the first fetal surgery for spina bifida in the UK. She launched Maternal and Fetal Adverse Event Terminology, a comprehensive system to improve safety in clinical trials in pregnant women. She was elected Fellow of the Academy of Medical Sciences in 2025.

== Early life and education ==
David studied preclinical medicine at the University of St Andrews, with an intercalated year in medical science in 1989, where she was awarded a first class degree. After studying clinical medicine at the School of Medical Sciences, University of Manchester, she was awarded MB ChB in 1992. After graduating, she worked in North West Thames Deanery, where she specialised in obstetrics and gynaecology. David joined University College London in 2000. She became a Member of the Royal College of Obstetricians and Gynaecologists in 1998 and a Fellow in 2016. She completed her doctorate in fetal gene therapy for treatment of early onset genetic disease. She developed prenatal gene therapy treatments for congenital respiratory, gastrointestinal and haematological diseases. She showed that ultrasound guided therapy was effective at delivering gene therapy vectors. She trained alongside Charles Rodeck in maternal fetal medicine at University College London Hospitals NHS Foundation Trust.

== Research and career ==
David develops prenatal treatments for life-threatening disorders using gene therapy and stemcells. She developed the fetal gene therapy research programme at University College London in 2007. A year later, she was awarded a Higher Education Funding Council for England Senior Clinical Lectureship in women's health at University College London and University College London Hospitals NHS Foundation Trust. She established the hospital's preterm birth clinical service in 2008, which provides care for women with spontaneous preterm baby loss. She pioneered the first clinical trial of stem cell transplantation for osteogenesis imperfecta. In 2018 she led the successful NHS England Specialist Commissioned service application to treat fetuses with congenital open spina bifida at UCL Hospital/Great Ormond Street Hospital with UZ Leuven, Belgium, which was recommissioned 2023–2028. She is deputy director of the Tommy's National Centre for Preterm Birth Research and leads the centre at UCL.

In 2013, David established the EVERREST consortium of five international academic health science centres and an industrial partner translating a novel therapy for early-onset FGR to clinic. Using maternal uterine artery Vascular Endothelial Growth Factor (VEGF) gene therapy, the concept is the first to demonstrate a method to safely increase fetal growth. The consortium validated a predictive model for clinician and patient-selected outcomes and achieved the first orphan designation for placental insufficiency with FGR, meeting the European Medicines Agency criteria for a rare disease, demonstrating the importance of this life-threatening disease.

Maternal and Fetal Adverse Event Terminology, a system developed by David, enhances safety monitoring for clinical trials in pregnancy. The system encourages researchers to collect information about the well-being of the mother and the fetus, and has been adopted by clinicians, regulators and the pharmaceutical industry.

David has argued that more funding should go into pregnancy research. She has appeared on BBC Radio 4, explaining that pregnant women want to and can participate in clinical trials, "There is this perception that women, pregnant women and breastfeeding women do not want to participate in clinical trials… This is not the case". Her work with the James Lind Alliance Priority Setting Partnership suggested the number one research question was to develop better tools to predict preterm birth, while patients wanted lifestyle changes that would reduce the risk of preterm birth. She worked closely with the charity Tommy's, as both a trustee and researcher, to improve medical outcomes and the experiences of pregnant mothers. She has called for more research into the reasons Black women have higher rates of preterm birth. David's imaging research has resulted in a breakthrough in understanding how cervical trauma increases spontaneous preterm birth risk after late-labour stage Caesarean birth.

David enjoys mentoring clinicians and academics in women's health. She was nominated and featured as a role model in the British Medical Association's Women in Academic Medicine.

As a clinician, David works in the University College London Hospitals Elizabeth Garrett Anderson Obstetric Wing. She was awarded the 2024 Award for North Thames Clinician of the Year.

In 2025, David was appointed The Professor Tan Seang Lin, Dr Grace Tan and OriginElle Fertility Distinguished Chair in Women's Health. Later that year she was elected Fellow of the Academy of Medical Sciences.

== Selected publications ==
- Jane Elizabeth Norman; Neil Marlow; Claudia-Martina Messow; et al. (24 February 2016). "Vaginal progesterone prophylaxis for preterm birth (the OPPTIMUM study): a multicentre, randomised, double-blind trial". The Lancet. 387 (10033): 2106–2116. doi:10.1016/S0140-6736(16)00350-0. ISSN 0140-6736. PMC 5406617. PMID 26921136.
- Michael Ebner; Guotai Wang; Wenqi Li; et al. (6 November 2019). "An automated framework for localization, segmentation and super-resolution reconstruction of fetal brain MRI". NeuroImage. 206 116324. doi:10.1016/J.NEUROIMAGE.2019.116324. ISSN 1053-8119. PMC 7103783. PMID 31704293.
- Andrew Sharp; Christine Cornforth; Richard Jackson; et al. (7 December 2017). "Maternal sildenafil for severe fetal growth restriction (STRIDER): a multicentre, randomised, placebo-controlled, double-blind trial". The Lancet Child & Adolescent Health. 2 (2): 93–102. doi:10.1016/S2352-4642(17)30173-6. hdl:10468/5604. ISSN 2352-4642. PMID 30169244.

== Personal life ==
David is a fan of Joni Mitchell, and has said that her favourite album is Blue.
