= Anna David (journalist) =

American journalist (born 1970)

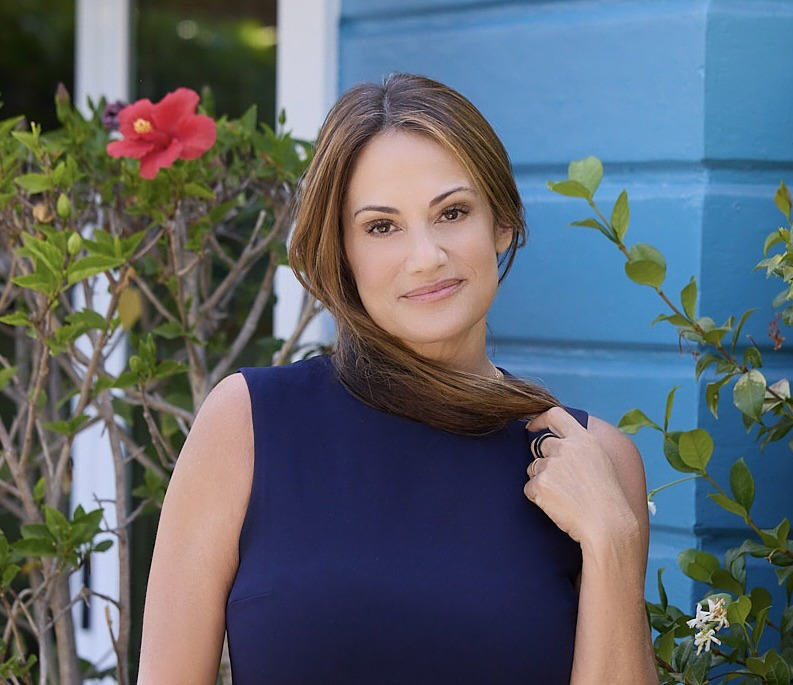
- Born: 1970 (age 55–56)
- Education: Trinity College
- Occupations: Publisher, writer, speaker, television personality, podcaster
- Website: www.annadavid.com

Anna Benjamin David (born 1970) is an American publisher, author, speaker, podcast host, and television personality.

== Early life ==
David was born to Jewish parents. She is a graduate of Trinity College.

== Career ==
=== Book and magazine author ===
David is the author of the novels Party Girl (HarperCollins, 2007), Bought (HarperCollins, 2009), and the non-fiction books Falling For Me (HarperCollins, 2011), Reality Matters (HarperCollins, 2010), True Tales of Lust and Love, How to Get Successful by F*cking Up Your Life and Make Your Mess Your Memoir. Her book By Some Miracle I Made It Out of There, co-written with Tom Sizemore, was a New York Times bestseller.

Her novel Party Girl portrays a celebrity journalist's alcoholism and subsequent sobriety. In 2018, the movie rights to Party Girl was acquired by producer Niels Juul. In 2021, she got the rights to Party Girl back from HarperCollins and relaunched the book under her own publishing imprint. In late 2024, David released a revised "PG Version" of Party Girl with much of its explicit content removed, prompting the Wall Street Journal to describe her as, "part of an era of tell-all writers now worried about their children reading their books."

David's work has appeared in The New York Times, The LA Times, The Huffington Post, Playboy, Salon, The Daily Beast, Time, Details, Cosmo, Playboy, New York Post, and many others.

In 2017, David launched Legacy Launch Pad Publishing, a company that publishes books for entrepreneurs.

=== Television personality ===
David was one of the main hosts on G4’s Attack of the Show for four years and has been featured on Good Morning America, The Talk, Hannity, Red Eye, Dr. Drew, Jane Velez Mitchell and The Insider as well as on various other programs on Fox News, CTV, MTV News, VH1 and E!.

In 2010, David started speaking at colleges about addiction and recovery. That year, she began delivering the keynote speech “Surviving and Thriving in an Addictive Society” at colleges across the country.

David hosted "On Good Authority", a podcast on publishing. David is also the book critic for KATU Portland's morning show and writes about literature for Los Angeles Magazine.

== Personal life ==
In 2023, David and her partner James Agnew had a baby via surrogacy, a topic she writes about for Los Angeles Magazine.

== Bibliography ==
- Party Girl (HarperCollins, 2007)
- Bought (HarperCollins, 2009)
- Reality Matters (HarperCollins, 2010)
- Falling For Me (HarperCollins, 2011)
- Animal Attraction (2012)
- By Some Miracle I Made It Out of There (Simon & Schuster, 2013)
- They Like Me They Really Like Me (2013) (audio version, 2015)
- True Tales of Lust and Love (Counterpoint/Soft Skull, 2014)
- Make Your Mess Your Memoir (Launch Pad Publishing, 2020)
- On Good Authority (Legacy Launch Pad Publishing, 2023)
