= Tina Wood =

British television personality

Tina Wood (born March 16, 1974) is an on-air television personality, writer and producer. She is currently the Executive Producer of the new programming for Xbox.

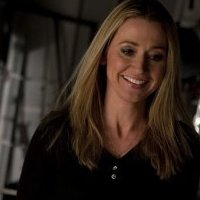
Tina Wood Summerford

== Early life and career ==
Wood was born in Blackpool, England, one of five children to Anthony and Catherine Wood. Her father was British and her mother Canadian. Her family moved to Montreal when she was young. After a few years in Canada her parents and siblings moved to the United States, settling in Miami. They later moved to Orlando, where Wood began school. She attended six different schools and graduated from Edgewater High School, where she was Senior Class President and Athlete of the Year.

Wood attended Florida State University, where she studied broadcasting and played softball for the Seminoles. She had ambitions to become a sports broadcaster and worked for ABC Sports throughout her college career.

However, the day after she graduated, she drove across the country to Los Angeles to work as an intern on Spike Jonze's first feature film, Harold and The Purple Crayon. The film was eventually cancelled and her first paying job was as a casting assistant on the Mark Medoff film Santa Fe. Here, she turned her inspirations towards writing.

After Santa Fe wrapped she became an assistant to actor Jere Burns during his days on Something So Right. Here, Wood was absorbed in the world of television. She worked on the Universal Studios backlot every day, where the show filmed alongside Just Shoot Me.

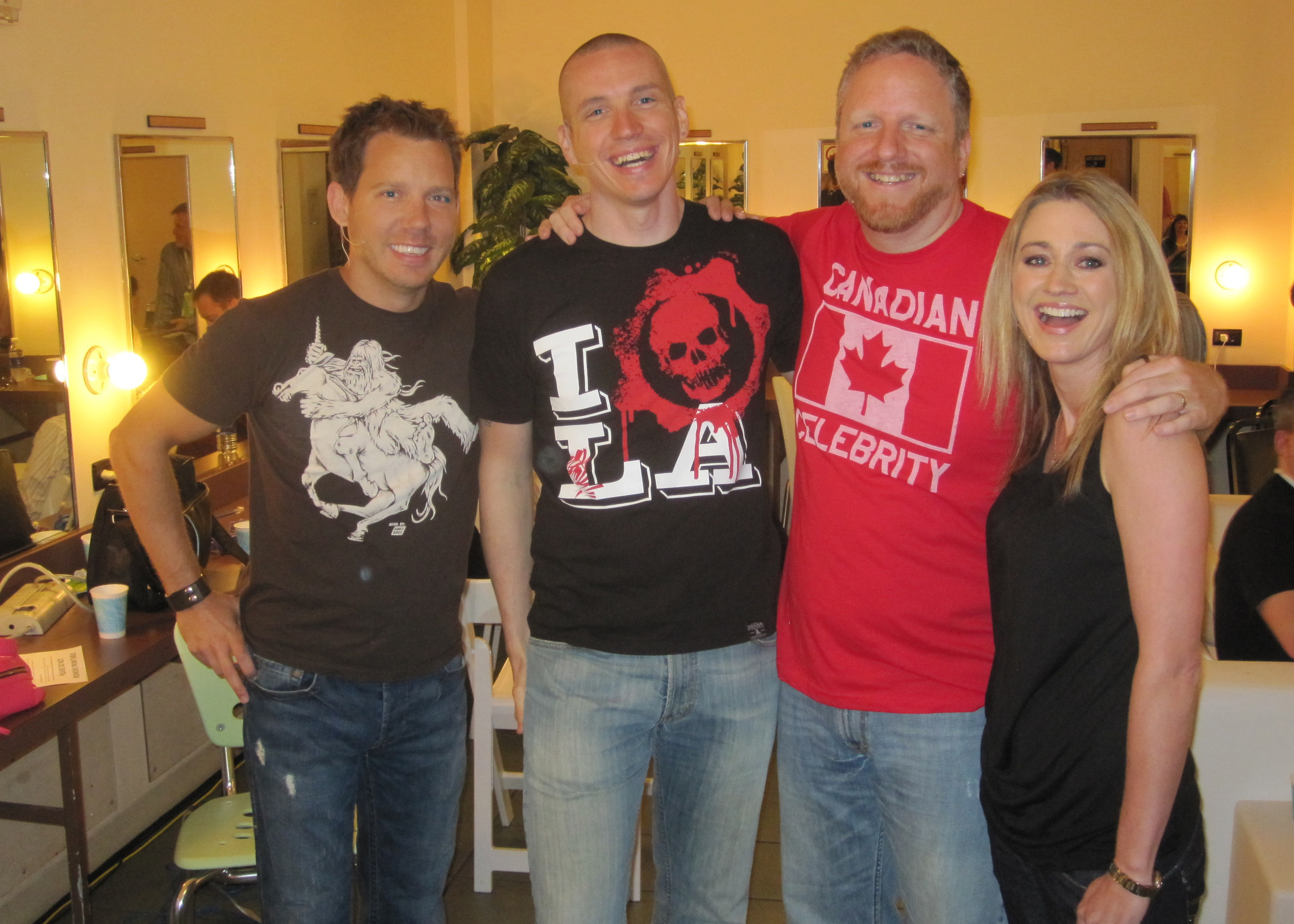
Tina Wood with Gears of War creators Cliff Bleszinski, Lee Perry, and Rod Fergusson at Electronic Entertainment Expo 2010.

She began writing television specs and acquired a literary agent. She worked in development at Fox Studios doing script coverage for Harold Ramis' production company Ocean Pictures. She also worked for Jim Cameron's Lightstorm Entertainment.

In 2000, Wood was hired as a staff writer to help launch the first ever television network for gamers, G4. She was the head writer of the network, lending her craft to multiple shows including Icons, Sweat, Cheat, and multiple specials. She also served as a host and producer of the interactive gaming show G4tv.com. She served in this role alongside Laura Foy, Geoff Keighley, and previously Scot Rubin. On the show, Wood's gamertag was T-Dub.

On December 12, 2005, Wood announced on her personal blog that G4tv.com had been cancelled by G4, and the last episode of the series would be filmed on December 17, 2005. Wood, along with Laura Foy, moved on to become part of a new Microsoft Internet show named Channel 10, which spotlights the latest in gaming and technology and the people who use it. Wood later appeared in G4's Attack of the Show, occasionally filling in as a guest correspondent and game news commentator.

Wood continued working with Xbox as on-air talent, and in 2011 became full-time Executive Producer of New Programming. She was the Show Production Executive Producer for Microsoft's nightly "Xbox @ E3 Live" 2013 streaming coverage on Xbox Live, which reunited her with G4 personalities Kevin Pereira and former X-Play host Morgan Webb.

== Personal life ==
Wood is married and has one daughter. She now goes by the name Tina Wood Summerford.
