= Kristin Adams =

American television personality and correspondent

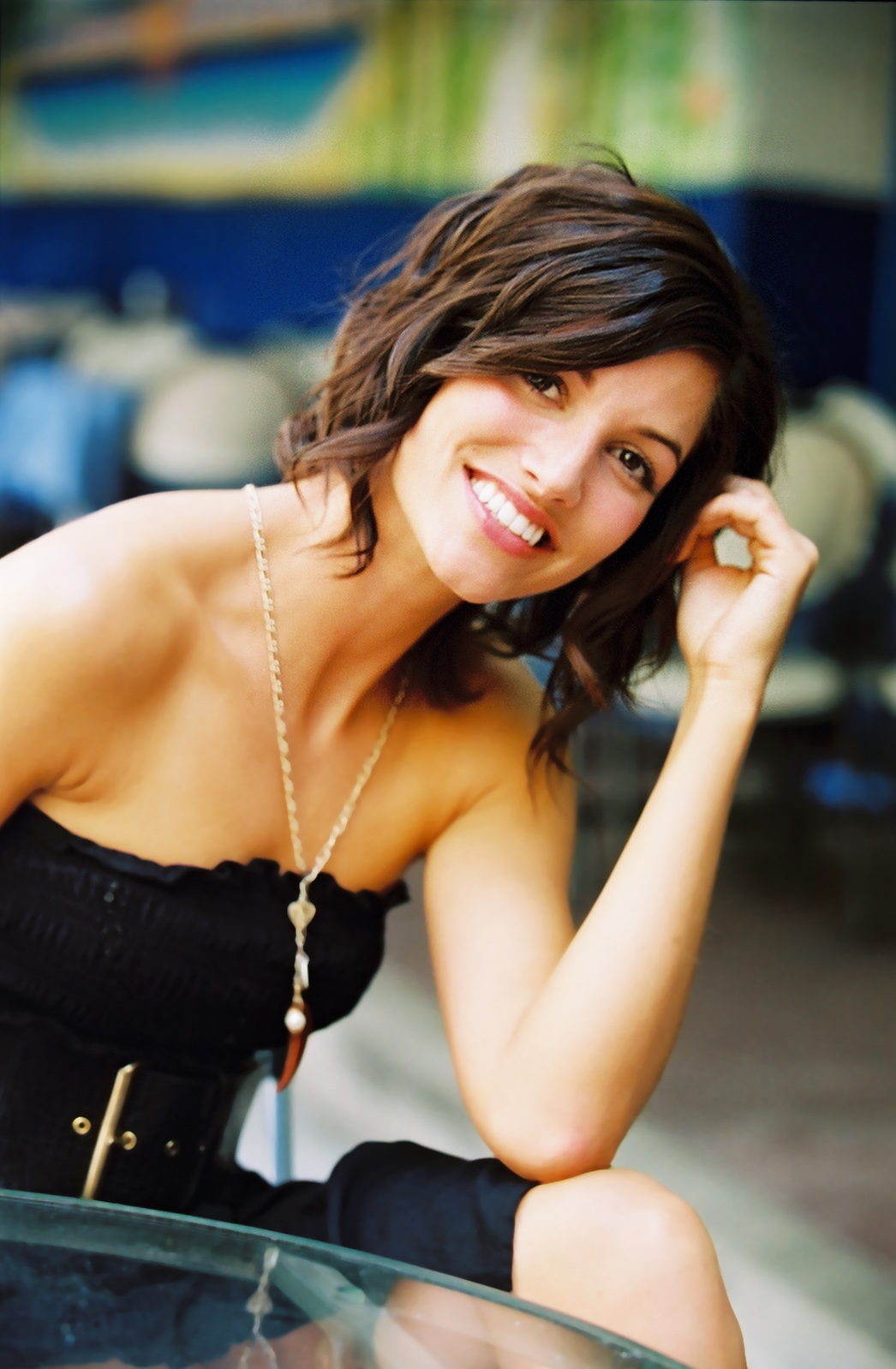
- Adams in 2007
- Born: Kristin Nicole Holt; Plano, Texas, US
- Occupations: Television personality, entertainment news correspondent, singer
- Years active: 2002–present
- Spouse: Daniel Adams (m. 2008)
- Children: 2

Kristin Nicole Adams (née Holt), is an American television personality, entertainment news correspondent, and singer.

Adams first rose to public awareness on American Idol. Between 2005 and 2008, Kristin served as the second host of G4's Cheat!, a television show dedicated to video game cheats and strategies. In 2008, Cheat! segments were incorporated into G4's X-Play, where she was a correspondent and occasional host throughout the remainder of the series. She also substituted hosting roles for the network's other shows and specials, as needed. She hosted "Poker Night" on GSN and Nissan GT Academy on Speed. On January 1, 2010, Adams became the new co-host of the Character Fantasy film showcase on the USA Network. In 2012 Adams was a co-host/correspondent on Real Music Live on NBC.

== Career ==
Adams (then still Kristin Holt) was eliminated in the first round of viewer voting in the first season of American Idol. She auditioned in Dallas and her audition was memorable because, in her rush to embrace Paula Abdul after being told that she had made the Hollywood rounds, she fell and slipped under the judges table. She was considered as a possible replacement for Brian Dunkleman as co-host for the second season of American Idol, however, most of her footage from preliminary contestant auditions was edited out of the show by November 2002, when her role was reduced to special correspondent. She performed as the vocalist of the band, Stranger Days, from 2004 to 2007.

Adams worked as a top 40 morning radio co-host in Dallas on KRBV, as the host of Hasbro's DVD game Shout About Television, and as a host on the Starz network. She worked with V-Cast on Verizon Wireless phones. As an actress, she had brief appearances in two productions, as a reporter on a 2008 episode of the television series Dirty Sexy Money, and as a bartender in the 2009 film Rock Slyde.

She has worked for Samsung as a presenter for "Samsung Tomorrow TV", covering their products at the Consumer Electronics Show in 2014 and 2015.

As of 2017, Adams was the presenter on GameStop TV, an in-store marketing feature for the GameStop chain of stores.

== Personal life ==
She is a Texas Christian University graduate. While there, she became a Dallas Cowboys cheerleader and made the 12-person Show Group team, which traveled the globe entertaining U.S. military troops on USO Tours. She married Daniel Adams in 2008 and they have two children together.
