= AustinShow =

American Twitch streamer and YouTuber (born 1993)

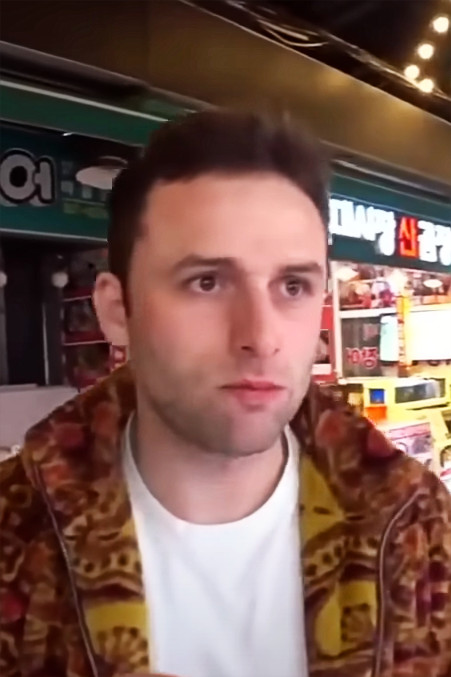
- Austin in 2022
- Born: November 12, 1993 (age 33)
- Education: Portland State University
- Occupations: Twitch streamer; YouTuber; TV personality; Podcaster
- Organizations: Misfits Gaming; 100 Thieves

Twitch information
- Channel: AustinShow
- Years active: 2013–present
- Genres: Talk show; game show
- Followers: 1.7 million

YouTube information
- Channel: AustinShow
- Years active: 2020–present
- Subscribers: 486 thousand
- Views: 180 million
- Last updated: April 8, 2026

AustinShow (also written as Austin Show; born November 12, 1993) (Note: AustinShow said in a livestreamed podcast on October 26, 2024 that he would turn 31 in November 2024. He also noted that he used to lie about his age by one year, but the current birth year on his Wikipedia article was correct, although the remainder of his birth date was wrong. At the time, the year listed was 1993. The article previously listed a birth year of 1994, that is incorrect per the October 2024 comments as well as AustinShow saying he was 28 in August 2022 on another podcast.) is an American Twitch streamer, YouTuber, podcaster, and media personality. He is known for hosting various talk and dating shows on Twitch, including Love or Host. He is also a co-host of the Fear& podcast.

== Early life ==
Austin was born on November 12, 1993. He was raised in Portland, Oregon and attended Portland State University. He has stated that he is of Lebanese, Syrian, and Irish descent.

== Career ==
=== 2013–2019: Early career ===
Austin began streaming Runescape on Twitch in 2013. He streamed under the name Rajj Patel, which he says came from him playing with a lot of Indian friends during his childhood. He also spoke in a faux Indian accent online. Austin later began hosting various talk and dating shows on his stream. He created The Rajjchelor, a dating show inspired by The Bachelor, and Rajj Royale, a debate show, both of which are presented in an elimination-type format. Notable guests that have appeared on the shows include James Charles, Pokimane, Mia Malkova, and Lil Nas X.

Due to the live, unscripted nature of Austin's broadcasts, a number of controversial incidents have occurred during the shows. In March 2018, the streamer Aqualadora admitted to intentionally killing a dog after Austin asked her to reveal the worst thing she had ever done.

=== 2020–2021: Persona change and collaboration ===
In March 2020, Twitch banned streamer Kaceytron after she made insensitive comments regarding the COVID-19 pandemic during one of Austin's broadcasts.

On June 12, 2020, Austin announced that he would be dropping the RajjPatel moniker entirely, after dropping the Patel last name from his persona in late 2019. The name had generated controversy in the past due to his portrayal of Indian people as a white man. In a statement released on Twitter, he stated, "I don't want any part of my image, name, or persona to be inappropriately borrowed from a culture that I don't have the right to represent. So, moving forward, I will be going by my first name, Austin, and rebranding everything as a derivative of that." His flagship shows The Rajjchelor and Rajj Royale were renamed to Love or Host and The Royale, respectively.

In July 2020, it was announced that Austin would be the host of a game show titled Dare Package on the streaming media channel VENN. On July 11, 2020, Austin, along with rapper Wiz Khalifa, hosted a charity stream for Rise Above the Disorder, a non-profit that focuses on providing mental health services to people of color.

At GlitchCon 2020, a virtual version of TwitchCon, Austin hosted a talent show featuring celebrity judges Andy Milonakis and T-Pain.

On March 11, 2021, Austin signed with the gaming organization 100 Thieves as a content creator.

=== 2022–present: Name Your Price and continued growth ===
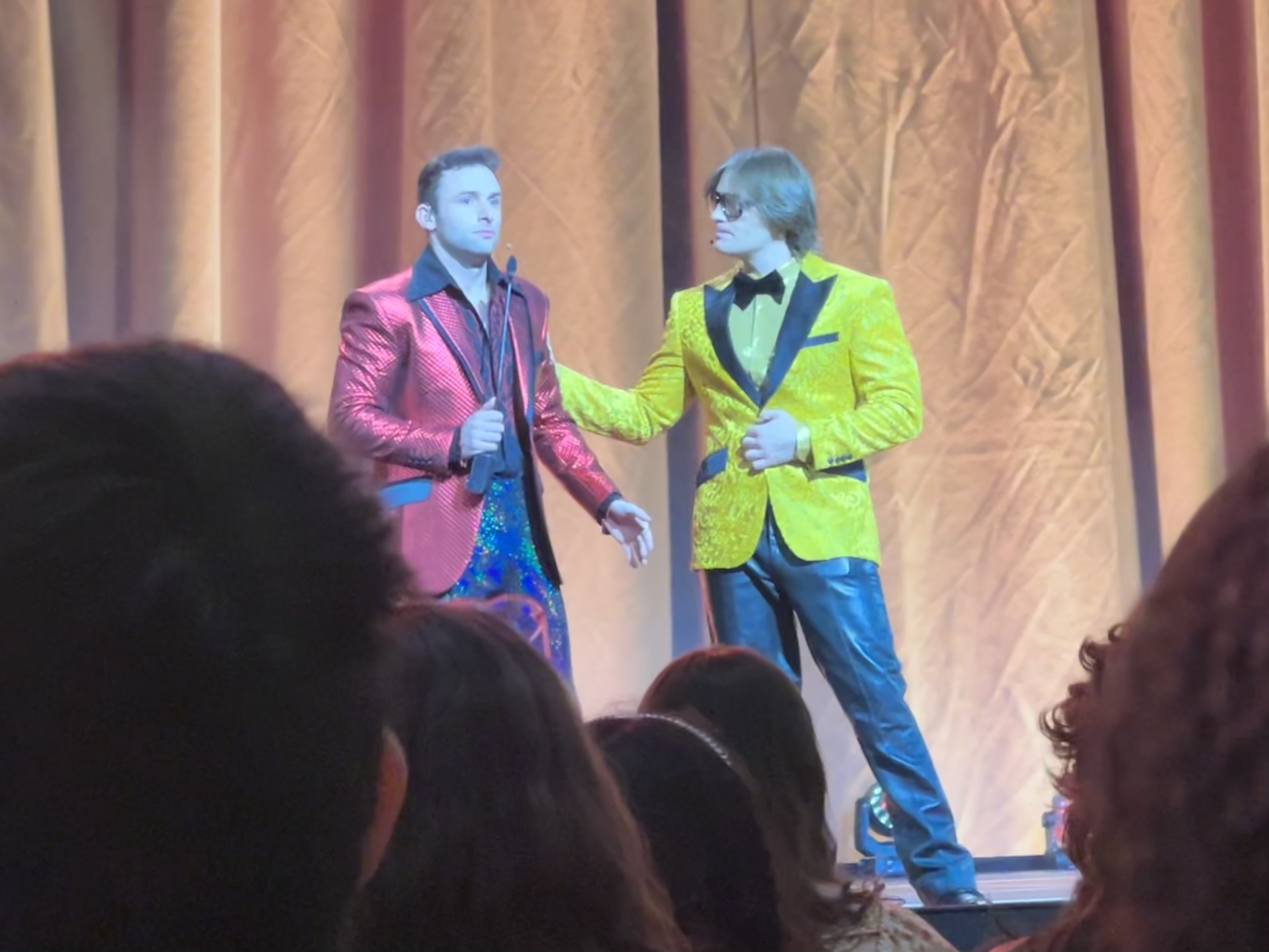
AustinShow and Will Neff during Name Your Price live show at TwitchCon Las Vegas 2023.

On February 3, 2022, Austin signed with G4 to host Name Your Price, a 1970s-themed game show inspired by The Price Is Right, with Will Neff. On February 10, it premiered on Austin's Twitch channel. The show ran for two seasons before ending due to G4's shutdown in October 2022. Austin left 100 Thieves on March 6, 2023, and announced days later that he had joined Misfits Gaming as a content creator and executive producer. A few days later, he announced that his show, Name Your Price, would be revived through Misfits Gaming.

In mid-2023, Austin joined the Fear& podcast as a co-host alongside Hasan Piker, QTCinderella, and Will Neff.

On October 9, 2023, Name Your Price returned for a third season. This season is the first to utilize a touring format, with episodes set to be filmed in front of live audiences in Miami, Las Vegas (TwitchCon), Houston, and Long Beach. Each episode features Austin as a co-host alongside Neff, as well as other large streamers as contestants, product presenters, and guests.

In February 2024, Austin began hosting a new reoccurring show on his Twitch channel called In the Tub, where he joins fellow streamers in their bathtubs to informally interview them with various game segments throughout. On February 17, 2024, Austin along with co-host Neff were awarded the "Best Streamed Series" award for Name Your Price at the 2023 Streamer Awards.

== Personal life ==
Austin identifies as gay. He came out via Twitter in April 2020.

Austin wanted to be a pilot when growing up, playing flight simulator games and later even practicing on a real full flight simulator. He is a fan of the Minnesota Vikings.

Austin describes himself as "fairly liberal". He supported Joe Biden in the 2020 United States presidential election. He was invited to the 2024 Democratic National Convention as part of the "Creators for Kamala" campaign. In October 2024, Austin appeared in a livestream hosted by streamers Pokimane and Valkyrae, featuring U.S. senator Bernie Sanders, in support of the Kamala Harris 2024 presidential campaign.

== Awards and nominations ==
Year	Ceremony	Category	Nominated work	Result	Ref.
2023	The Streamer Awards	Best Streamed Series	Name Your Price	Won	
2026	The Streamer Awards	Best Streamer Collab	AustinShow and YourRage	Pending	
