= Scot Rubin =

American talk show host (born 1969)

- Born: May 26, 1969 (age 57)
- Occupations: Radio host; Television host; Consultant; Producer; Production manager
- Years active: 1996–present
- Known for: Game Time!; G4tv.com; All Games Interactive
- Spouse: Stephanie Rubin
- Children: Austin and Madison Rubin
- Parent(s): Norm and Sandra Rubin
- Call sign: agn
- Website: All Games Network; Big Door; NITROPOD

Scot Rubin (born 1969) is an American talk show host and producer.

== Life ==
Rubin founded All Games Productions, All Games Network and co-founded the G4 television network.

All Games launched in 1996. In 2000 Rubin was hired as a consultant for Comcast to develop a 24-7 cable TV channel about video games. In 2001, he was hired by G4 Media and served as Vice President of Internet, IT and Program Editorial. He developed, produced and hosted G4's interactive talk show for three seasons. Rubin also served as a Producer on the first 3 seasons of the EA Sports Madden Challenge, and play by play guy for the first two Madden Challenge Finals. In 2004, G4 began abandoning its video game format, Rubin left and relaunched All Games Productions, a production company providing consulting and production services to the video game and entertainment industry. Rubin currently serves as the Senior Vice President of Digital Media for Big Door, located in Redondo Beach, California. Rubin is also the founder of NITROPOD, a frozen ice cream company. In 2022 Scot Rubin announced he would be a launch creator with the GameStop NFT Marketplace.
