= Geoff Keighley =

Canadian journalist and TV presenter (born 1978)

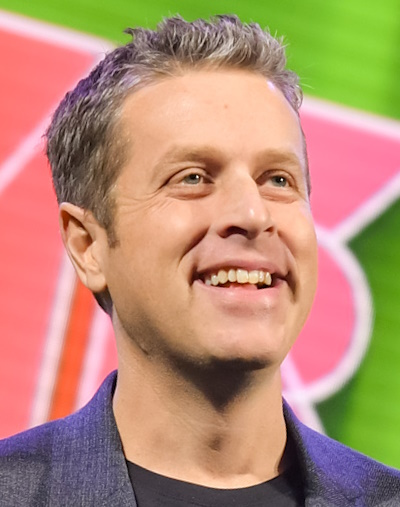
- Keighley in 2018
- Born: June 24, 1978 (age 48)
- Occupations: Video game journalist; presenter
- Years active: 1994–present
- Notable work: The Final Hours series (1998–present); Spike Video Game Awards (2003–2013); The Game Awards (2014–present); Summer Game Fest (2020–present)

Geoff Keighley (/ˈkiːli/ KEE-lee; born June 24, 1978) is a Canadian video game journalist and television presenter, best known for his role as the host of several video game industry conferences and presentations. He is the executive producer and host of the Game Awards since its inception in 2014, having previously served as the executive producer of the Spike Video Game Awards. He also hosts and produces Summer Game Fest, and has hosted live events for trade fairs such as Gamescom and the now-defunct E3.

He previously hosted the video game show GameTrailers TV, and G4tv.com. Keighley is also a freelance writer whose work has appeared in Kotaku, among other publications. His multi-media series The Final Hours, originally an article series published by GameSpot, features in-depth interviews and behind-the-scenes with developers of popular franchises like Portal, Mass Effect and Tomb Raider.

== Career ==
=== Early career ===
Geoff Keighley was born on June 24, 1978, to Patricia and David Keighley (1948–2025). He grew up in suburban Toronto with his two siblings, Chris and Jennifer. Keighley's parents were executives at IMAX Corporation, which came with membership in the Academy of Motion Picture Arts and Sciences; his father was the company's first chief quality officer. Through them, Keighley gained an appreciation of the Oscars and awards shows in general. He and his younger brother were exposed to computers and video games at a young age, both becoming fans of the medium. As a teenager, Keighley started GameSlice in 1996, a website for game reviews and journalism.

Keighley's foray into video game reporting and presentation had been through Cybermania '94, the first video game awards show broadcast on television. Keighley was a teenager at the time, but, through his father's connections, was brought in to write the nomination announcements read by William Shatner. The show was not considered successful, but from it, Keighley was inspired to develop some type of equivalent of the Academy Awards for video games in his career.

Keighley entered into the University of Southern California in 1997 to obtain a business degree. During that time, he pitched to GameStop a series of long-form articles to delve into the development of some popular games, inspired by VH1's Behind the Music. His first such work was "Blinded by Reality: The True Story Behind the Creation of Unreal", covering the development of Unreal. He was able to get behind the scenes access to Epic Games because he had been friends with Epic's co-founder Mark Rein during their youth in Toronto. Other such works Keighley wrote for GameSpot included deep dives into the development of Daikatana and Metal Gear Solid 2. Through these articles, Keighley gained numerous contacts with development studios, including open access to Valve. Following the attainment of his business degree, Keighley entered into law school, inspired by a Time reporter suggesting he write about the crossover between business and video games. Around this time in 2002, Keighley also began writing articles for Entertainment Weekly and Fortune, and was also brought on as a co-host of The Electric Playground alongside Tommy Tallarico by the show's creator Victor Lucas.

=== Television appearances ===
Spike TV brought on Keighley to host his own show, GameTrailers TV with Geoff Keighley in 2003. He was also involved in other video game-related projects on television. On Comcast's G4 network, he appeared as the network's lead anchor for its E3 press conference coverage, interviewing CEOs from companies like Sony and Electronic Arts. For MTV, he created the concept and produced (with LivePlanet) Gears of War: Race to E3 and Gears of War: Race to Launch, two specials that took viewers inside the development of the hit Xbox 360 game from Microsoft. In 2007, the Discovery Channel aired a five-hour documentary on releases including those of such companies as World of Wonder Productions, based on a treatment by Keighley, who also served as consulting producer. Keighley has also hosted and co-produced a number of video game launch specials for Spike TV, including Madden NFL 08 Kickoff featuring a performance by Ozzy Osbourne and Halo 3: Launched!, featuring a performance by Linkin Park. He was also interviewed on what became a controversial Fox News segment on Mass Effect, and was later praised by gamers online for being the only one on the show who had actually played the game.

Keighley in 2013

Keighley was also criticized in 2012 for presenting information about Halo 4 while sitting among stands advertising Mountain Dew and Doritos products. Several people critiqued this presentation as a sign of a lack of journalism standards, and the scenario became known as "Doritosgate" within the gaming community, while Keighley was derogatorily called "Dorito Pope". Eurogamer's Robert Florence criticized Keighley's presentation and the state of game journalism at that time: "Geoff Keighley is often described as an industry leader. A games expert. He is one of the most prominent games journalists in the world. And there he sits, right there, beside a table of snacks. He will be sitting there forever, in our minds. That's what he is now. And in a sense, it is what he always was." The event was an inflection point for Keighley's career as he transitioned from games journalist to gaming event host.

Keighley was invited by the producers of Spike's Video Game Awards program to help with the programming from 2006 onward. In 2013, Spike changed the format of the show and rebranded the awards as the VGX Awards. To Keighley, the format became more commercial and promotional rather than a celebration of video game achievements, and coupled with the ridicule he faced from Doritosgate in 2012, he opted to leave the show.

=== The Game Awards and Summer Game Fest ===
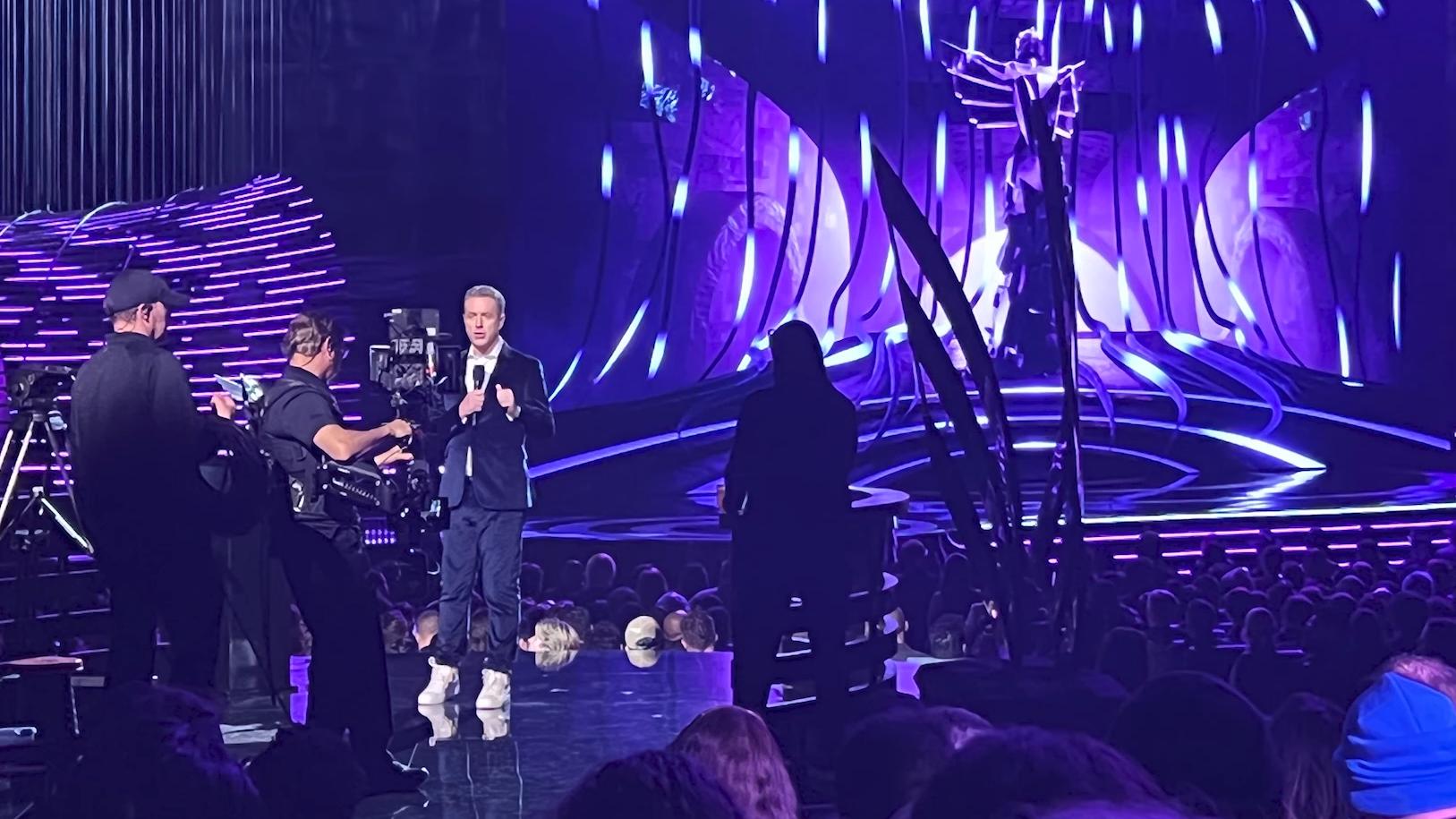
Keighley presenting at the Game Awards 2022

Through 2014, he funded his own efforts to put together a new awards show, gaining the support of Microsoft, Sony and Nintendo, as well as major publications and industry leaders. Keighley thus established the Game Awards, which were first presented in December 2014, and of which Keighley remains the primary host. In December 2016, Keighley was picked as a judge for the Viveport Developer Awards (VDAs).

Keighley was a participant of E3, the annual video game trade show, since its start, and from E3 2017 to E3 2019, Keighley arranged and hosted the E3 Coliseum, a live-streaming event running over the course of E3 that brought in developers and publishers at E3 for interviews and other discussions. However, with the Entertainment Software Association making significant changes to the format of E3 2020 (prior to its cancellation due to the COVID-19 pandemic), Keighley stated he would not be organizing an E3 Coliseum event nor attending the show for the first time in 25 years.

With E3's cancellation among other several other trade shows and events like Gamescom from the pandemic, Keighley worked with several major publishers and video game industry leaders to launch the first Summer Game Fest from May to August 2020. During this period, Keighley helped developers and publishers present game announcements and other presentations, along with Steam and Xbox to provide game demos during this period. Summer Game Fest was also held in 2021 and 2022 as a virtual event, and expanded to an in-person event in 2023.

=== Ongoing journalism ===
Keighley has written a series of articles titled The Final Hours, using behind-the-scenes access to various game studios to write in depth about the development process as a game nears completion. In more recent years, these articles were released as mobile apps. In a July 2008 interview on The Jace Hall Show, Keighley spoke about the importance of this process, stating "There's such a lack of investigative journalism. I wish I had more time to do more, sort of, investigation. Really dig into some of these bigger issues, so I could look at like, the 'Red Ring of Death' problem. That's never really been properly reported about, like what really happens."

== Other appearances ==
Keighley appeared as a holographic character in the game Death Stranding. A mask of Geoff Keighley's face was also added to the video game Among Us. In August 2021, Geoff Keighley was cast as Uncle Theodore in Muppets Haunted Mansion. Keighley also had a brief cameo role in The Matrix Resurrections, as a game awards presenter.

== Works ==
- Keighley, Geoff (2011). The Final Hours of Portal 2. ASIN B004XMZZKQ.
- Keighley, Geoff (2012). The Final Hours of Mass Effect 3. ASIN B007KVXSFG.
- Keighley, Geoff (2013). The Final Hours of Tomb Raider.
- Keighley, Geoff (2014). The Final Hours of Titanfall: Behind the Scenes at Respawn Entertainment. ASIN B00JQFIE1W.
- Keighley, Geoff (2020). The Final Hours of Half-Life: Alyx.
