= TruTV (Latin America) =

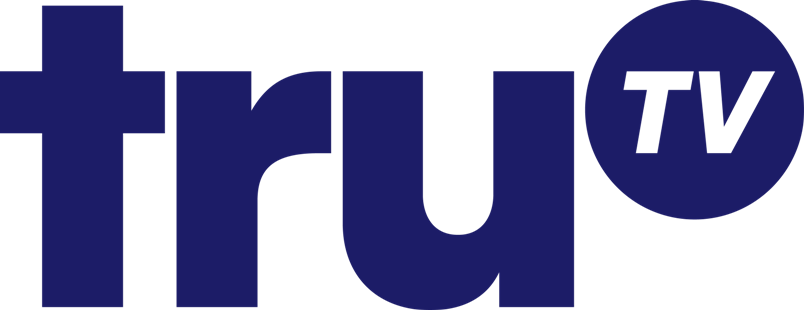
- Country: Argentina
- Broadcast area: Latin America
- Headquarters: Buenos Aires, Argentina

Programming
- Language(s): Spanish; Portuguese; English (via SAPaudio track)
- Picture format: 1080i HDTV (downscaled to 16:9 480i/576i for the SDTV feed)

Ownership
- Owner: Warner Bros. Discovery Americas
- Sister channels: Cartoon Network; Cartoonito; Tooncast; Discovery Kids; TNT; TNT Novelas; TNT Series; I.Sat; Space; HTV; MuchMusic; Glitz; Warner TV

History
- Launched: April 1, 2009
- Replaced: Retro
- Closed: October 31, 2023
- Replaced by: Adult Swim

Links
- Website: www.trutvla.com

TruTV was a Latin American pay television channel owned by Warner Bros. Discovery Entertainment. The programming schedule is centred towards reality shows. It was launched on April 1, 2009 replacing Retro. It is divided in two feeds, one in Spanish language and another one in Portuguese language, for Brazil. In July 2010, an HD feed was launched.

On September 3, 2023, it was announced that TruTV would be replaced by 24/7 channel, Adult Swim on October 31.

On October 31, 2023, TruTV was replaced by the 24/7 Adult Swim.

== History ==
=== As Retro ===
The channel was launched as Retro in the region by "Claxson Interactive Group Latin America & Iberia" and aired classical series and movies. In 2007, it was bought, along with I.Sat and Space by Time Warner, but continued to air the same programming. On March 25, 2009, Turner Broadcasting System announced that "Retro" would be replaced by "truTV" on April 1, 2009 in order to get a new kind of audience. "truTV" is the first channel in the region to be 24-hours of investigation-based programming. All the programming from Retro was moved to Turner Classic Movies, also owned by Time Warner.

=== Transition to truTV ===
On April 1, 2009, at 8:30 am UTC Retro aired its last show, an episode of the classic animated series Robotech, called Symphony of Light. At 9:00 am UTC the channel changed to truTV. Since that date, the channel has been airing 24 hours without interruptions and in several countries of Latin America. The official website, however, was launched in June 2009, two months after the launch of the channel. truTV HD, a high-definition version of the channel was launched in July 2010.

In March 2015, the channel started broadcasting shows from the defunct Argentinian channel Infinito, after Turner decided to replace the channel with TNT Series due to low ratings.

In September 2016, the channel presents a new graphic image and a new logo.

=== Transition to Adult Swim ===
On September 3, 2023, it was announced that TruTV would be replaced by the 24/7 channel, Adult Swim on October 31.

At 12:00 a.m. in Mexico (UTC-6), at 2:30 a.m. in Chile (UTC-4), from October 31, 2023, TruTV was replaced by the 24/7 channel Adult Swim being truTV Presents: World's Dumbest... the last show broadcast in that feed, at 3:45 a.m. in Colombia (UTC-5), the last show to be broadcast, was South Beach Tow, also as 4:25 a.m. in Ecuador (UTC-5) being Hack My Life the last show broadcast in the Ecuatorian feed, and 6:09 a.m. in Argentina (UTC-3) the last show broadcast was Impractical Jokers and TruTV was replaced by the 24/7 channel Adult Swim after airing for 14 years.

== Programming ==
The network has been adding more programming every month since its original launch.

- 1000 Ways to Die (broadcast in March 2015 after the end of broadcasting of Infinito)
- Bait Car
- Body of Evidence
- The Carbonaro Effect
- Cheaters (broadcast in March 2015 after the end of broadcasting of Infinito)
- Container Wars
- Crisis Point
- Dog The Bounty Hunter (broadcast in March 2015 after the end of broadcasting of Infinito)
- Hack My Life
- I Detective
- Impractical Jokers
- In Harm's Way
- The Investigators
- Inside
- L.A. Forensics
- Masterminds
- Missing Persons Unit
- Most Daring
- Most Shocking
- Murder By The Book
- North Mission Road
- Ocean Force
- Parco P.I.
- Party Heat
- The Real Football Factories
- Rich & Reckless
- Ski Patrol
- South Beach Tow
- Speeders
- Storage Hunters
- Suburban Secrets
- The Takedown
- Trace Evidence
- truTV Presents: World's Dumbest...
- Under Fire
- US Bounty Hunters
- World's Toughest Cops
- World's Worst Tenants (broadcast in March 2015 after the end of broadcasting of Infinito)

== Logos ==
Logo from April 1, 2009 to August 31, 2016.

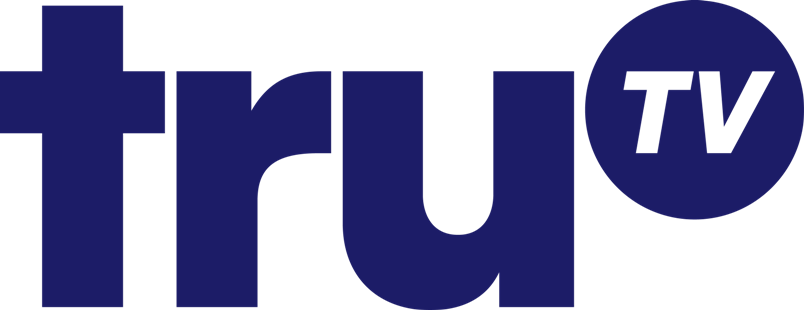
Logo from September 1, 2016 to October 31, 2023.

== See also ==
- truTV
- Turner Broadcasting System
