= Infinito (TV channel) =

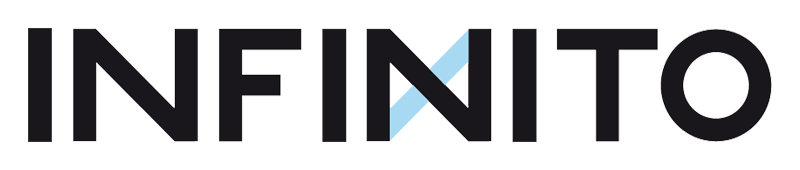
- Country: Argentina
- Broadcast area: Latin America
- Headquarters: Buenos Aires, Argentina

Programming
- Picture format: 576i/480i SDTV

Ownership
- Owner: Imagen Satelital (1993-1997); Claxson Interactive Group (1997-2007); Turner Broadcasting System Latin America (2007-2015)
- Sister channels: TNT; Space; I.Sat; TCM; Warner Channel; HTV; TruTV; Glitz*; Cartoon Network; Boomerang; Tooncast

History
- Launched: September 13, 1993; 32 years ago
- Closed: March 17, 2015; 11 years ago
- Replaced by: TNT Series

Links
- Website: www.la.infinito.com

Infinito was an Argentinian cable television channel owned by Turner Broadcasting System Latin America (today Warner Bros. Discovery Americas). It aired documentaries, reality shows and movies.

== History ==
=== Early years: conventional documentary channel ===
The channel was originally launched and operated by the Argentine company Imagen Satelital, owned by Argentine businessman Alberto González, in February 1994.

In its first phase, the channel tried to gain a foothold within the networks of the documentary genre, without major conceptual differences in terms of its programming.

As of August 1996, the Infinito logo was changed from its green triangle logo to a blue trefoil knot, and the text "infinito" below. In May 1997, Imagen Satelital and its package of channels were acquired by Cisneros Television Group (which in 2000 was renamed Claxson Interactive Group when it merged with Ibero American Media Partners and the portal El Sitio). In September that year, the channel started improving its potential for in-house productions with the Noches temáticas cycle and, for the 1998 FIFA World Cup, Esto es Fútbol, about the tournament's history. In September 1998, with the end of its children's educational program Recreo Satelital, Infinito started airing documentary cycles in the afternoon, while becoming, in October, the first Latin American channel to use a platinum edit box.

=== First relaunch ===
Faced with the need to reposition the channel and place it within the leading brands, the new owner of the channel reformulated the programming content and relaunched the channel on April 13, 1999. In this new phase, the channel maintains the documentary format but pointing to themes that surprise and intrigue, that escape the normal, unexplained paranormal events, taboo topics and alternative realities that endure and are strengthened in the new millennium.

As part of its new positioning, the channel started acquiring more content from other networks and production houses from Latin America and abroad. Among the first local sellers was Televisión Nacional de Chile, who had licensed content to Infinito in its previous phase. In its first year as a paranormal channel, Infinito had two programs following its new theme: Zona Infinito and Signos. With the channel's relaunch, Infinito was received by 10,415,000 people in Latin America, in a group oscillating between ages 12 and 64. Most of its audience (8,087,000 people) was found in Argentina.

To potentiate its arrival to Mexico, the decision to film an edition of Zona Infinito in the country was taken in April 2000, following the arrival of the channel to DirecTV late in the previous year, after doing a similar experience in Chile. In July, it had the exclusive premiere of the sci-fi series First Wave, in the new Infinito Films & Series strand. The channel's ratings increased in Brazil, potentiating the creation of original programs to the country, as well as having agreements with independent production companies from several countries. In December, Colombian production company Televideo finished the production of a two-part documentary on the fall of General Noriega of Panama, sent to Infinito, scheduled to air by January 2001.

During 2001, Infinito opened up a new commitment and opened a new slot for original productions, one of the differential pillars of the brand, having 25% of its own production within the total number of programs offered. During that year, it increased its presence in Mexico, signing agreements with Sky (600,000 subscribers), the 298 systems that made up PCTV (1,450,000 subscribers) and Cablevisión in Distrito Federal (9 million subscribers in the entire region). From August that year, the original documentaries seen on Hora Infinito were seen on over-the-air television on Canal 7 in Argentina, with the aim of strengthening the brand and providing never-before seen content to terrestrial audiences. At MIPDOC 2002 in Cannes, it showed its potential of selling Hora Infinito to more OTA networks, for the appealing topics of its productions. With that, having a catalog of over 400 hours of original documentaries, Claxson decided to sell the strand for a 52-week period (one documentary per week) to interested networks.

From October 2001, Infinito was divided in two feeds, Infinito Sur for Argentina, Paraguay and Uruguay and Infinito Latinoamérica for the rest of the region.

In 2002, Infinito presented Mundo Infinito, a program hosted by Puerto Rican actor Walter Mercado and recorded at Caesars Palace Hotel in Las Vegas. with the announcement of the program in June and facing a later event held in Miami on July 31, eight programs were recorded, with the goal of recording four per month. That same year, it had two million subscribers in Mexico, a country where its paranormal themes went so well with its cultural reality. To increase public fidelity, InJaus, Claxson's creative agency, announced a campaign to launch the Música Infinito CD, as a novelty award for the cable companies to continue carrying the channel. In October, it announced the premiere of documentary series Astrosports as part of Claxson's plan to increase production in Brazil. The documentary was about the company of the same name which provided astrological services to soccer team Esporte Clube Guarani from Porto Alegre, which also talked about possible links to Felipe Scolari, who led the Brazilian team at the 2002 FIFA World Cup, where Brazil scored its fifth victory.

Facing Claxson's strategies for the 2002/2003 season, the goal was to provide 90% of the group's original productions to Infinito, with the remaining 10% reserved for sister channels Space and Venus. To follow such priorities, the markets where it had more potential were Mexico and the Iberian Peninsula (where its arrival for the latter market was scheduled for 2003). In December 2002, Infinito was already set to launch in the US Hispanic market, which was achieved in April 2003 for Time Warner Cable's package in the New York head-end, reaching a potential audience of 1,2 million Spanish speakers. In September that year, the channel launched to competing company Cablevision, who signed an agreement with Claxson for two channels and to strengthen iO en Español's package: HTV and Infinito. In Argentina, an agreement with Kier was signed to launch the Colección Infinito book collection.

In March 2004, Infinito presents a new image and introduces the slogan "Abre tu mente" (Open Your Mind), that in the channel's promotions it was placed in 2 languages, in Spanish and Portuguese with Abra sua mente, since then that channel also reached Brazil, and this continued until 2009, and to accompain the branding, the channel's logo became transparent.

In October 2007, Infinito along with a package of 6 other signals from Claxson Interactive Group were acquired by Turner Broadcasting System Latin America, one of the divisions of Time Warner (today Warner Bros. Discovery Americas).

=== Second relaunch ===
Since January 1, 2009, after a restructuring by Turner, the channel abandons the theme and profile it managed and renews its content, changing towards a new focus oriented to inspiration, amazement and teachings from facts and people in the real world that have surpassed what is expected even in fiction, the logo changes radically, the "∞" symbol is removed from the logo, and now consists only of the text "INFINITO", in addition, it leaves aside the documentaries, and is replaced by programming of guidance to inspiration, and wonder.

The channel presented a new slogan "Realidad que supera a la ficción", since this change, the channel incorporated different themes for each programming style, such as Infinito Films, Good for You, Complot, Docs, Inspiracion, Guilty Pleasures, Crimen and Asombro.

Starting in mid-2011, The channel premiered widely successful programs such as 1000 Ways to Die and that same year began broadcasting reality television programs, such as Cheaters, among others reality show, and it included series, relegating the documentary format to the background.

=== Final years and name changing ===
In July 2013, the thematic segments were withdrawn, leaving only Infinito Films.

By 2013 and 2014, Infinito no longer paid attention to its slogan, which disappeared, and they also changed the graphic image of the channel, and its programming focuses, this time, on reality television programs and films, moving away from its initial concept of documentaries that it had from its early years until the graphic image changing in mid-2013.

Infinito ceased its broadcasts on March 10, 2015 in Argentina and on March 17 of the same year in the rest of Latin America being Operation Repo its last program broadcast.

Infinito was replaced by TNT Series.

The Infinito's programming was moved to the channel TruTV until 31 October 2023 and was replaced by 24/7 Adult Swim Channel.

== Programming ==
=== 1993 - 1999 ===
- El precio de la fama
- Expedición
- Outdoor Life: with William Conrad (Vida al aire libre)
- Testimonios de protagonistas
- Aventuras en el buceo
- El universo interior
- Más allá del mañana
- Obras maestras del documental
- Viajando con Infinito
- Adventures, Travels & Archives (Archivos, Viajes y Aventuras)
- Encuentro con la Naturaleza
- Reportajes
- First Works (Obras iniciales)
- Entre paletas y cinceles
- La magía del cine
- Los heroes de Pugilandia
- Leyendas del boxeo
- Nuestra curiosa naturaleza
- MasterComics
- Guía Documental con Mario Grasso
- Leyendas del Ring
- Historia de...
- Patrulla de la playa
- Más allá de las fronteras
- Esto es fútbol
- Mí amigo, el caballo
- Maestros marciales
- Los creadores
- Más allá del 2000
- El mundo según George
- Hola Carlitos
- En el zoologico
- Enviado especial
- La magía del cine
- Especiales de Infinito
- Hablemos con los animales
- Patrulla de la playa
- Exposiciones universales
- Recreo Satelital
- Los grandes vapores
- La magía de Bolivia
- Misterios, magia y milagros

=== 1999 - 2009 ===
- Hierbas sagradas
- Historias de abducción
- Lugares misteriosos
- Unsolved Mysteries (Misterios sin resolver)
- Yoga con Wai Lana
- Mundos de fé
- Poderes terrenales
- El representante de Dios
- El día menos pensado
- Crímenes que estremecieron a Gran Bretaña
- Historias de Fantasmas
- Diarios de Ovnis
- Tesoros perdidos
- Devociones
- Los cazafantasmas
- Zona Infinito
- Creencias
- Mundo Infinito
- Casa Infinito
- Juro que es Verdad
- Beyond: with James Van Praagh
- Guía extraterrestre
- Ovnis, verdades y mentiras
- El misterioso mundo de Arthur C. Clarke
- Misterios Urbanos

=== 2009 - 2015 ===
- Final 24
- Crimen y redención
- BRIC
- Kirchner: A un año de su muerte
- Vuelo 3142: la tragedia de LAPA
- Efemérides
- Incoming
- La decisión equivocada
- Extreme Makeover: Home Edition: Latin America
- Huellas
- Confesiones de un sicario
- Cuerpos sin edad
- ¿Qué edad tiene tu cuerpo?
- 26 personas para salvar al mundo
- El último hombre en pie
- Tattoo Nightmares
- Rizzoli & Isles
- Cazadores de subastas
- Fanboy Confessional
- Cheaters
- 1000 Ways to Die (1000 maneras de morir)
- Extreme Makeover: Home Edition
- Mujeres tras las rejas
- Condenados por error
- Deadliest Warrior (El guerrero más letal)
- XXL
- Vanity insanity
- Esposas de la tribú
- Extreme Food
- Scare Tactics (Tácticas de miedo)
- World's Worst Tenants (Inquilinos extremos)
- Repo Games
- Guerra de Containers
- The Carbonaro Effect (Efecto Carbonaro)
- Cosentino
- Hasta que la muerte nos separe
- Pequeños asesinos
- Total Drama
- Hardcore Pawn: Chicago (El mejor precio: Chicago)
- Survivor: Thailand
- Survivor: Palau
- Survivor: All-Stars
- Survivor: Marquesas
- Survivor: África
- Impractical Jokers
- Cazadores de tesoros
- Parejas asesinas
- Operation Repo (Operación Rescate)
- Esta es mi historia
- Frontline
- Pill Poppers
- Dr. G: Medical Examiner
- Los restauradores
- La super nadadora
- Dog the Bounty Hunter (Dog: el cazarrecompensas)
- Excavadores de Tesoros
- Osmin Psycho Trainer
- La última mujer en pie
- TruTV Presents: World's Dumbest... (Los vídeos más tontos del mundo)

==== Programming blocks ====
- Documentales de Infinito
- Noche de Sábado
- Especiales de Infinito
- Infinito Complots
- Infinito Místico
- Infinito Insólito
- Infinito Oculto
- Infinito Paranormal
- Infinito Original
- Infinito Alternativo
- Infinito Ovni
- Infinito Esotérico
- Infinito Films
- Infinito Guilty Pleasures
- Infinito Asombro
- Infinito Good For You
- Infinito Inspiración
- Infinito Crimen
- Infinito Docs
- Infinito Complot
- Terror Infinito

== Slogans ==
- 1993 - 1994: El canal documental latinoamericano (English for The Latin American documentary channel)
- 1994 - 1996: El canal universal con perfil nuestro para usted (English for The universal channel with our profile for you)
- 1996 - 1998 / 1996 - 1999: El primer canal documental latinoamericano (English for The first Latin American documentary channel) / El mundo del documental (English for The documentary world)
- 1999 - 2000: Señal del nuevo milenio (English for Signal of the new millennium)
- 2000 - 2001: Experimenta lo desconocido (English for Experience the unknown)
- 2001 - 2004: Existe otra realidad y solo un canal te la muestra (English for There is another reality and only one channel shows it to you)
- 2004 - 2009: Abre tu mente (English for Open your mind)
- 2009 - 2013: Realidad que supera a la ficción (English from Reality surpasses fiction)
