= List of programs broadcast by Warner Channel =

This is a list of shows that have aired on the cable network Warner TV. Shows currently aired on the network are in bold.

== 0–9 ==
- The 100
- 2 Broke Girls (currently seen in France, also streaming on HBO Max)
- 4 Blocks
- 36th People's Choice Awards
- 37th People's Choice Awards
- 38th People's Choice Awards (live telecast)
- 39th People's Choice Awards (live telecast)
- 40th People's Choice Awards (live telecast)
- 63rd Primetime Emmy Awards (live telecast)
- 64th Golden Globe Awards (live telecast)
- 64th Primetime Emmy Awards (live telecast)
- 65th Primetime Emmy Awards (live telecast)
- 66th Primetime Emmy Awards (live telecast)

== A ==
- A to Z
- Ace Ventura: Pet Detective
- Adult Swim (currently streaming on HBO Max)
- Alcatraz
- ALF (currently streaming on HBO Max, except United States)
- Alice
- Aliens in America
- **All American**
- All American: Homecoming
- All Elite Wrestling
- Almost Human
- America's Best Dance Crew
- Animaniacs (currently streaming on HBO Max in Latin America)
- **Animal Kingdom** (In Brazil seen on AMC)
- Angel From Hell
- Angie Tribeca (In Brazil seen on TBS)
- Are You There, Chelsea?
- Arrow
- Aqua Teen Hunger Force (currently streaming on HBO Max)

== B ==
- The Bachelor
- The Bachelorette
- Batman: The Animated Series (currently seen on Italy, also streaming on HBO Max and Adult Swim)
- Batman Beyond (currently seen on Adult Swim)
- Batwoman (also seen on HBO and HBO Max)
- The Bedford Diaries
- Beetlejuice
- Believe
- Better With You
- Bewitched
- Bipolar (seen only in Brazil)
- Bosch (seen only in Germany)
- Blade: The Series
- Bleach
- Blindspot
- Boruto: Naruto Next Generations (only in Latin America, also seen on HBO Max)
- Bluff City Law (seen only in Germany)
- The Brady Bunch
- Brooklyn 9-9

== C ==
- Californication (currently seen on TNT Series)
- Call Me Kat
- Cane
- The Cat&Birdy Warneroonie PinkyBrainy Big Cartoonie Show
- Chase
- Chuck
- The Class
- Claws
- **The Cleaning Lady** (currently streaming on HBO Max)
- The Client
- Close to Home
- Club House
- **Cobra Kai** (currently streaming on Netflix)
- Cold Case (currently in Brazil seen on A&E and Latin American seen on TNT Series)
- Complete Savages

== D ==
- Dallas (2012)
- Death Note
- Deep in the City
- Detention
- Diff'rent Strokes
- Documentários Cultura Pop (seen only in Brazil)
- Dragon Ball Super (also seen on Cartoon Network)
- Dragon Ball Z (currently seen on Adult Swim)
- Dragon Ball Z Kai (also seen on Cartoon Network)
- Droopy

== E ==
- E-Ring
- Eagleheart
- Eight Is Enough (seen only in Italy)
- Eleventh Hour
- The Ellen DeGeneres Show
- ER (currently seen on TNT Series, currently seen on Italy and also streaming on HBO Max)
- Everwood
- The Evidence

== F ==
- The Facts of Life
- Fastlane
- La Femme Nikita
- Flashpoint
- Forever
- **Found** (currently streaming on HBO Max)
- Four Kings
- Freakazoid! (currently streaming on Max and seen on Tooncast in Latin America)
- Freddie
- **Friends** (currently streaming on HBO Max)
- Fringe (currently seen in Italy)
- Full House

== G ==
- **Georgie & Mandy's First Marriage** (currently streaming in HBO Max)
- Gilmore Girls
- Gimme a Break!
- Go On
- God Friended Me
- Golden Boy
- Gossip Girl (2007) (currently streaming in HBO Max)
- Gossip Girl (2021) (also streaming in HBO Max) (Note: Only in selected territories where HBO Max is not yet available.)
- Gotham (currently seen in Italy)
- Ground Floor
- Growing Pains (currently seen in Italy)

== H ==
- Happy Days
- Harry's Law
- Hercules: The Legendary Journeys
- Histeria!
- Harry Potter: Hogwarts Tournament of Houses (also seen on Cartoon Network and streaming on HBO Max)
- Hostages
- Hot Streets
- Human Target

== I ==
- I Dream of Jeannie
- I Hate My Teenage Daughter
- Invasion

== J ==
- Jesse
- Joey
- Justice

== K ==
- Knight Rider
- Knights of the Zodiac (currently seen on Adult Swim)
- **Kung Fu**

== L ==
- The L Word
- The Last O.G.
- Latitudes (seen only in Brazil and also seen on TNT and Glitz*)
- Laverne & Shirley
- Legacies (also streaming on HBO Max)
- Legends of Tomorrow
- Life is Wild
- Line of Duty
- Lois & Clark: The New Adventures of Superman (currently seen in Italy, also streaming on HBO Max)
- Looney Tunes (currently streaming on HBO Max ans seen on Tooncast in Latin America)

== M ==
- Men in Trees
- Men of a Certain Age
- The Mentalist (currently seen on TNT Series)
- Metalocalypse (currently streaming on HBO Max)
- The Middle
- Mike & Molly
- **Miracle Workers** (also streaming on HBO Max)
- Mission Hill
- Modern Men
- Mom (also streaming on HBO Max)
- **Monk** (seen only in Germany)
- Mortal Kombat Conquest
- **Ms Fisher's Modern Murder Mysteries** (seen only in France)

== N ==
- The Nanny
- Naruto (currently seen on Adult Swim)
- Narcos
- Narcos: Mexico (seen only in Germany)
- The New Adventures of Old Christine (currently streaming on HBO Max)
- **Night Court** (currently streaming on HBO Max)
- Nikita (currently seen in Italy)
- The Nine
- Notes from the Underbelly

== O ==
- The O.C.
- Odd Man Out
- Off Centre
- Orphan Black
- The Opposite Sex
- Outsourced

== P ==
- Para we are King (also streaming on HBO Max)
- Pennyworth
- Person of Interest
- Pinky and the Brain (Currently streaming on Max and also seen on Tooncast in Latin America)
- Pinky, Elmyra and the Brain (currently in Latin America streaming on HBO Max)
- Police Academy: The Animated Series (Coming soon currently in Italy in particular)
- Presidio Med
- Privileged
- Project Blue Book (seen only on France)
- Providence
- Pushing Daisies
- Pussycat Dolls Present

== Q ==
- Queer You Are (also streaming on HBO Max)

== R ==
- Raised by Wolves (also streaming on HBO Max) (Note: Only in selected territories where HBO Max is not yet available.)
- Related
- Resurrection Blvd.
- Reunion
- Rick and Morty (currently streaming on HBO Max and Adult Swim)
- **Riverdale** (only in Latin America)
- Rizzoli & Isles
- Robot Chicken (currently streaming on HBO Max and Adult Swim)
- Rodney
- Rush Hour

== S ==
- S.O.S. Pé na Bunda (seen only in Brazil)
- The Secret Circle
- The Secret Lives of Men
- SEAL Team (seen only in Germany)
- Search Party (currently streaming on HBO Max)
- Seinfeld
- Selfie
- $#*! My Dad Says
- Six Feet Under (currently streaming on HBO Max)
- Skin
- Smallville (currently seen in Italy, also in streaming on HBO Max in Latin America)
- Smith
- The Sopranos (currently streaming on HBO Max)
- Spenser For Hire
- Stargirl
- Step by Step
- Studio 60 on the Sunset Strip
- Suburgatory
- Suddenly Susan
- Super Fun Night
- Super Friends
- Supergirl
- **Superman and Lois**
- Superman: The Animated Series (currently streaming on HBO Max and Adult Swim)
- Supernatural (currently streaming on HBO Max, currently seen in Italy)
- Superstore
- Surviving Jack
- The Swan
- The Sylvester and Tweety Mysteries (In Latin America currently streaming on HBO Max and Tooncast)

== T ==
- Taz-Mania
- Terminator: The Sarah Connor Chronicles
- **The Big Bang Theory** (currently seen in France, also streaming on HBO Max)
- **The Detour**
- The Dukes of Hazzard
- The Flash (1990)
- **The Flash** (2014)
- **The Flight Attendant** (also streaming on Max) (Note: Only in selected territories where HBO Max is not yet available.)
- The Fresh Prince of Bel-Air (seen previously in France and currently in Italy, also streaming on HBO Max)
- The Huckleberry Hound Show (seen only on Italy)
- The Mysteries of Laura
- **The New Adventures of Robin Hood** (currently seen in Italy)
- The Shivering Truth (currently streaming on HBO Max)
- The Vampire Diaries (currently streaming in HBO Max)
- Thieves
- Third Watch (currently seen in Italy)
- ThunderCats (currently streaming in Max) on Latin America
- Tiny Toon Adventures (Currently streaming in Max on Latin America)
- Titans
- TMZ
- Touched by an Angel
- **Transplant** (seen on France)
- Trauma
- Traveler
- Twins
- **Two and a Half Men** (currently streaming in HBO Max)
- Two of a Kind
- **The X-Files** (seen in Germany)

== U ==
- Undateable

== V ==
- V
- Vengeance Unlimited
- Veronica's Closet
- Vida de Estagiário (seen only in Brazil)
- **Visitors** (seen only in France)

== W ==
- Warehouse 13
- Webster
- The West Wing
- What I Like About You
- Who's the Boss?
- **Wipeout**
- Witchblade
- Without a Trace
- Working
- **Wrecked**

== Y ==
- Yashahime: Princess Half-Demon (also seen in HBO Max and Adult Swim)
- Young Sheldon (also seen in HBO Max)
