= List of programs broadcast by Sony Channel (Latin America) =

This is a list of shows that have aired on the Latin American versions of Sony Channel. Shows currently aired on the network are in bold.

== 0-9 ==
- 10 Items or Less
- 3rd Rock from the Sun (repeats currently seen on Comedy Central)
- 30 Rock (repeats currently seen on TBS)
- 7th Heaven
- 8 Simple Rules
- 90210

== A ==
- According to Jim
- **Águas do Brasil** (seen only in Brazil)
- The Agency
- Agent Carter
- Agents of S.H.I.E.L.D.
- Agora Sim! (seen only in Brazil)
- Alias
- Alice
- American Dreams
- American Idol
- American Inventor
- **America's Got Talent**
- America's Next Top Model
- As If
- The Associates

== B ==
- **Baby Daddy**
- Balls of Steel
- Baywatch
- Beautiful People
- Becker
- The Best Years
- Bette
- Beverly Hills, 90210
- Big Day
- **Black-ish**
- **The Blacklist** (seasons 1 and 2 seen on Canal Sony region-wide, currently seen on Canal Sony in Spanish-speaking countries and on AXN in Brazil. It then moved to Warner Channel)
- Bloopers
- Blow Out
- Bob Patterson
- Body of Proof
- The Boondocks
- Brazil's Next Top Model
- Breaking Bad (repeats currently seen on AMC)
- Breakout Brasil (seen only in Brazil)
- Bunheads

== C ==
- Los Caballeros las Prefieren Brutas
- Call Me Fitz
- Caroline in The City
- Carpoolers
- **Campeões pelo Brasil** (seen only in Brazil)
- Castle (currently seen on AXN)
- Celebrity Apprentice
- Celebrity Poker Showdown
- Charlie's Angels
- Charmed (repeats currently seen on Syfy)
- Cheers
- **Chefs na Rua** (seen only in Brazil)
- **Cidades do Brasil** (seen only in Brazil)
- The Client List
- Coach
- **Code Black**
- **Comer Bem Que Mal Tem** (seen only in Brazil)
- Commander in Chief
- Community (also seen on Comedy Central)
- Cosby Mysteries
- The Cosby Show
- Cougar Town
- Coupling (US)
- Courting Alex
- Covert Affairs
- Crumbs
- CSI: Crime Scene Investigation (repeats currently seen on AXN and TNT Series)
- CSI: Miami (repeats currently seen on AXN and TNT Series)
- CSI: NY (repeats currently seen on AXN)
- Cuídate de la Cámara (seen only in Mexico)
- Cupid
- Cursed/The Weber Show
- **Curtindo o Rio** (seen only in Brazil)
- Cybill

== D ==
- Da Ali G Show
- DAG
- The Daily Show with Jon Stewart: Global Edition
- Dawson's Creek
- Days of Our Lives
- Dead Like Me
- Deadbeat
- The Defenders
- Desperate Housewives
- Devious Maids (currently seen on Lifetime)
- Dilbert
- The District
- Do Over
- The Drew Carey Show
- **Drop Dead Diva**

== E ==
- Early Edition
- Ed
- Eli Stone
- **Entubados** (seen only in Brazil)
- The Ellen Show
- Emily's Reasons Why Not
- Everybody Hates Chris
- Everybody Loves Raymond
- ER (repeats currently seen on TNT Series)
- **EstiloDF** (seen only in Mexico)
- Extreme Makeover

== F ==
- Falcon Beach
- Family Law
- Family Ties
- Felicity
- **Fire Country**
- The Fosters
- Franklin & Bash
- Frasier
- Friday Night Lights
- Friends (only seasons 1 to 7. It then moved to Warner Channel)

== G ==
- The Game
- Gary Unmarried
- GCB
- The Geena Davis Show
- Ghost Whisperer
- Grandfathered
- **Grey's Anatomy** (also aired on Star Channel)
- Grosse Pointe
- Grounded for Life
- Grown Ups

== H ==
- Happy Endings
- Happy Family
- Hidden Hills
- Home Improvement
- Hope & Faith
- How I Met Your Mother (currently seen on Star Channel)
- How to Get Away with Murder

== I ==
- The Incredible Hulk
- In Justice
- Iron Chef
- The IT Crowd (currently seen on I.Sat)
- It’s All Relative

== J ==
- Jake 2.0
- The Jamie Kennedy Experiment
- Jane by Design
- The Janice Dickinson Modeling Agency
- Joan of Arcadia
- Just Shoot Me!

== K ==
- The King of Queens

== L ==
- The Larry Sanders Show
- Las Vegas (repeats currently seen on AXN)
- Latin American Idol
- Law & Order: Criminal Intent (repeats currently seen on AXN)
- Less than Perfect
- Life as We Know It
- Life with Bonnie
- Live from Abbey Road
- Love, Inc.

== M ==
- Mad About You
- The Magicians
- Major Crimes
- Malibu Country
- Man Up!
- Married... with Children
- Marry Me
- The McCarthys (not seen in Brazil)
- Medium
- Melissa & Joey
- Melrose Place
- Melrose Place (2009)
- Men, Women & Dogs
- Mexico's Next Top Model
- Miami Vice
- A Minute With Stan Hooper
- Miss Venezuela: Todo Por La Corona
- Mistresses (US)
- Mixology (not seen in Brazil)
- Moonlighting
- Movie Stars
- The Muppets
- My Boys
- Mysterious Ways
- My Wife & Kids

== N ==
- Nada Que Ver (not seen in Brazil)
- The Nanny
- The Naked Truth
- Nashville
- Ned and Stacey
- The Neighbors
- NewsRadio
- No Ordinary Family
- Norm

== O ==
- Off the Map
- **Olhar Digital Plus [+]** (seen only in Brazil and also seen on AXN)
- Once and Again
- Once Upon a Time
- Once Upon a Time in Wonderland
- Out of Practice

== P ==
- Pan Am
- Parker Lewis Can’t Lose
- Parks and Recreation
- Party of Five
- Pasadena
- Pensacola: Wings of Gold
- Perfect Couples
- Popular
- Private Practice

== Q ==
- Queer Eye
- Queer Eye for the Straight Girl

== R ==
- The Real Housewives of Atlanta
- The Real Housewives of New York City
- The Real Housewives of Orange County
- Red Band Society (seen only in Brazil)
- Revelations
- Revenge
- Rock Road
- **Royal Pains**
- Rosie (1995-2003)

== S ==
- Samantha Who?
- The Sarah Silverman Program
- Saturday Night Live
- **Scandal**
- Scorpion (seen on Canal Sony in Brazil and on AXN in Spanish-speaking countries)
- Scrubs
- Secrets and Lies (seen on Canal Sony in Brazil and on AXN in Spanish-speaking countries)
- Seinfeld
- The Sentinel
- Sesiones con Alejandro Franco
- **Shark Tank**
- **Shark Tank Brasil** (seen only in Brazil)
- Shasta
- Los Simuladores
- The Single Guy
- The Six Million Dollar Man
- Spin City
- Starsky & Hutch
- The Steve Harvey Show
- Stingray
- The $treet
- Stylista
- Summerland
- S.W.A.T.
- Switched at Birth

== T ==
- Taxi
- Teen Wolf
- That '70s Show
- That '80s Show
- Three Sisters
- The Tick
- 'Til Death
- Time of Your Life
- Tommy Lee Goes to College
- **Top Chef**
  - Life After Top Chef
  - Top Chef: Just Desserts
  - Top Chef Masters
- Top Design
- Trophy Wife
- The Trouble with Normal

== U ==
- Ugly Betty

== V ==
- The Voice (US, currently seen on Universal Reality in Spanish-speaking countries and on E! in Brazil)

== W ==
- Wasteland
- What About Brian
- What About Joan
- Whoopi
- Whose Line Is It Anyway? (US)
- Will & Grace
- Wings
- Work with Me

== X ==
- **The X Factor** (UK)
- The X Factor (US)

== Y ==
- Ya Es 1/2 Día en China (not seen in Brazil)
- Young Americans
- The Young and the Restless
- Young & Hungry
