= Turner Classic Movies (international) =

Turner Classic Movies, a movie-oriented network that was originally established as a cable channel in the United States, has expanded to include worldwide versions.

== Europe, the Middle East and Africa ==
In Europe, the Middle East and Africa, Turner Classic Movies was available as ten separate channels for Africa, Central and Eastern Europe, France/Switzerland/Belgium, Germany/Switzerland, Greece/Cyprus, Italy, Middle East, Nordic countries, Spain, the UK/Ireland/Malta, and a pan-regional channel with various feeds in different languages for the Nordic countries, Benelux and other countries.

While in Poland, it was introduced from 1998 until October 6, 2015, as part of the WizjaTV platform along with a local version of Cartoon Network. The European feed was launched in 1999 until January 1, 2014, when its predecessor, the international version of TNT, dropped its film programming to become a general entertainment channel. Its penetration increased when it took over TNT's space on various platforms in 1999 and 2000.

In Romania, Turner Classic Movies aired after Cartoon Network on the same channel from 10:00 PM, local time.

In the United Kingdom, Turner Classic Movies 2 launched on May 2, 2006. The channel, which is a spin-off from the UK version of Turner Classic Movies, Turner Classic Movies 2 focuses mainly on the bigger films from the MGM and Warner film archives, including Citizen Kane, The Wizard of Oz, Casablanca, It Happened At The World's Fair, Speedway, North by Northwest and Meet Me in St. Louis, among others. The channel closed on August 12, 2013, and was replaced with Turner Classic Movies +1 on August 13, 2013.

The channel closed on 6 July 2023, while its sister channel Quest airs some of the channel's former film programming.

In December 2013, the pan-European channel closed in Portugal, with the launch of Cartoon Network Portugal. In September 2013, Turner Broadcasting System revealed its plans to close down the pan-European channel for the Benelux market. The channel closed on 1 January 2014. On 1 June 2017, TCM Europe closed down in all of the Nordic countries. In August 2018, The MENA feed dropped (Turner Classic Movies) tag and unveiled a new logo. The African TCM was rebranded to TNT in September 2018. In 2018, Greece has relaunched TCM again and was broadcasting on Cosmote, and broadcast in HD by 2019. In April 2019, TCM MENA became HD on beIN in the MENA Region. On 1 August 2019, Turner Classic Movies was rebranded to TCM Movies in the United Kingdom. Currently, TCM is only available in Spain, France, Switzerland and Belgium and the Middle East, North Africa, Greece, and Cyprus.

== Asia-Pacific ==
In Asia-Pacific, Turner Classic Movies was available as one feed that serves more than 14 territories. It was available in India until March 2, 2009, exclusively on Dish TV along with Boomerang. It is available in India on Tata Sky from August 2009 (Channel No. 357). It closed in January 2019.

== Latin America ==
TCM Latin American logo since 2015

TCM is also available in Latin America, but this version receives little attention unlike the US and EMEA counterparts. This version in Latin America was called TCM Classic Hollywood until mid-2009.

Starting on April 1, 2009, TCM Latin America was renamed TCM Classic Entertainment and started airing most of the programming from the former channel Retro, also owned by Turner Broadcasting System, and which also aired classic series and movies. Its programming was aired on TCM as Retro was replaced by truTV.

On January 10, 2024, Warner Bros. Discovery Latin America launched an HD feed across Intelsat 34 along with Tooncast, broadcasting the same content as the standard definition feed.
