= I.Sat =

- Final logo, used from 2010 to 2024
- Country: Argentina
- Broadcast area: Latin America and the Caribbean
- Headquarters: Buenos Aires, Argentina

Programming
- Languages: Spanish and Portuguese
- Picture format: 480i SDTV

Ownership
- Owner: Warner Bros. Discovery
- Sister channels: TNT; TNT Series; Space; Warner Channel; TCM; Cartoon Network; Cartoonito; Tooncast; Adult Swim; Glitz*; HTV; CNN; CNN en Español; MuchMusic

History
- Launched: April 5, 1993 (Latin America); April 1, 2008 (Brazil)
- Closed: February 29, 2024; 2 years ago
- Former names: I-Sat (1993-1998)

I.Sat (contraction of the Spanish phrase Imagen Satelital, which means "Satellite image", founder of the channel) was an Argentine cable television channel owned by Warner Bros. Discovery International. It aired movies, series, music, and shows. It was headquartered in Buenos Aires, Argentina.

It was broadcast on the satellite Intelsat 21 and was carried by most cable television companies in Argentina, Brazil, Bolivia, Chile, Colombia, Ecuador, Mexico, Panama, Paraguay, Peru, Uruguay, and Venezuela.

== History ==
Until 2007, the channel was owned by "Claxson Interactive Group Latin America & Iberia" (which was a subsidiary of the Venezuelan-based Grupo Cisneros) but that year the channel, along with Retro and Space, were bought by Turner Broadcasting System. It aired different programming on different blocks, such as "Primer Plano I.Sat" (foreign movies), "Cine Argentino Independiente" (independent Argentine films), "Asian Connection" (Asian films), and "Cortos I-Sat" (short films).

In 2007 it changed its programming from being a 24-hour movie channel to having movies, series, shows, documentary series, music, and some others. Some current programming includes Little Britain, Raising Hope, Misfits, and others.

Adult Swim, which previously aired on Cartoon Network, aired every night with adult animation series since 2007 after its cancellation from Cartoon Network; however, the Adult Swim block was cancelled from I.Sat on 2010 due to low ratings. Adult Swim, however, returned to I.Sat on April 3, 2015, until April 16, 2020.

In December 2023, Warner Bros. Discovery announced that I.Sat would shut down on February 29, 2024 with Glitz and the Latin American version of MuchMusic.

A tongue-in-cheek funeral was held in Córdoba in honor of the channel's heritage and past on February 29, while also raising doubts about the future of television, more specifically how its programming essence will survive.

== Logos ==
5.04.1993-16.12.1998	16.12.1998-1.12.2010	1.12.2010–29.02.2024

== Programming ==
=== Former programming blocks ===
- Cine Argentino Independiente: Argentine independent films.
- Cortos I.Sat: Short films.
- Cuentos de terror. Horror stories narrated by Alberto Laiseca.
- I.Films: Featured movies with monthly premieres.
- I.Series: Series, shows, and reality series.
- Primer Plano I-Sat: International Independent films.
- Adult Swim: Previously aired on Cartoon Network. It aired cartoons and anime series for adults since 2007. Discontinued in 2010. Returned in April 2015 until April 2020.
- Asian Connection: Asian films.
- BritTV: British shows and series from BBC and Channel 4.
- Comedy Central. Programming block with series from the TV channel Comedy Central. Discontinued in 2004.
- Cine Zeta. Cult, genre and exploitation cinema. 2000-2005.
- Furia Oriental: Anime series and Asian films.
- Sexorama. Softcore films. Discontinued in 2008.
