= Adult Swim (Latin America) =

Latin American TV channel

- Country: Latin America, Brazil and the Caribbean

Programming
- Languages: Spanish; Portuguese; English (available in SAP with translated continuity)
- Picture format: 1080i HDTV (rescaled to 16:9 480i/576i for SDTV feed)

Ownership
- Owner: Skydance Latin America and Carriban
- Sister channels: Cartoon Network; Cartoonito; Discovery Kids; Tooncast

History
- Launched: October 31, 2023; 3 years ago
- Replaced: TruTV

Links
- Website: adultswim.com/latam adultswim.com/br

Adult Swim (stylized as "[adult swim]", also abbreviated as "[as]") is a Latin American pay television channel of American origin, a variant of the original channel, owned by Skydance Corporation and operated by Skydance Latin America and Carriban for the entire Latin American region. Previously, like its American version, it was a programming block aimed at adult audiences, broadcast by Cartoon Network (2005–2008); I.Sat in two different stages (first dubbed from 2007 to 2010 and then in the original language, subtitled in Spanish, from 2015 to 2020); TBS (2018–2020) and, finally, Warner Channel (2020–2021).

The channel began broadcasting on October 31, 2023, replacing TruTV.

== History ==
=== As a block (2005–2021) ===
In Latin America, an Adult Swim block aired during the overnight hours on Cartoon Network beginning on October 7, 2005. It was originally carried on the regional version of the channel, when it was pulled off and picked up by I.Sat on November 19, 2007, another Turner Broadcasting System Latin America-owned-and-operated network.

The premiere of Adult Swim was received by a major backlash from at least a pay TV operator in Latin America. VTR, a Chilean cable TV company, unilaterally censored the block from its premiere until early 2007, due to editorial policies inherited from Ricardo Claro Valdés, one of the company's shareholders, infamously known for censoring programming on cable channels while he owned Metropolis Intercom, a company that was absorbed by VTR in 2005.

VTR's position was that Cartoon Network should be a children's channel and should not carry adult content whatsoever. According to a company study, the audience during Adult Swim's time slot was mostly children, which went against the company's policies. VTR and Turner Broadcasting System agreed to broadcast Adult Swim on VTR's PPV movie service, available only in digital and in some parts of Chile, due to the fact that VTR had not updated its cable TV networks at the time.

In early 2007, Adult Swim returned to the Cartoon Network grid until its first shutdown.

On December 1, 2010, I.Sat revealed that it was cutting Adult Swim programming due to low ratings, adding: "No matter if we add new shows, it would not work".

In 2014, it was announced that Adult Swim would return to Latin America that same year. Adult Swim premiered on the Brazilian feed of TBS on November 3, 2014. Adult Swim relaunched in Latin America on April 3, 2015, on I.Sat, in English with Spanish subtitles, premiering Rick and Morty and many other shows for the first time on the region.

On January 6, 2018, the block began broadcasting throughout Latin America on TBS. Unlike I.Sat, this block was being broadcast in Spanish.

After ceasing broadcasts on I.Sat and TBS, Warner Channel began airing the block on May 2, 2020, for Latin America and Brazil, with new content, such as Final Space and the rest of Aqua Teen Hunger Force and Robot Chicken series.

The block lost the schedule from Monday to Thursday and Saturdays on September 14, airing only on Mondays at midnight, and the following month, it stopped releasing new bumpers. On November 15, Adult Swim dropped out of Warner Channel's programming, being its last broadcast on November 8, 2021.

On June 24, 2021, HBO Max announced a list of some original Adult Swim content that became available since the platform's launch, including: Rick and Morty, Aqua Teen Hunger Force, Robot Chicken, Primal, Squidbillies, The Shivering Truth, and Your Pretty Face is Going to Hell. Its launch took place on June 29, 2021.

=== As a channel (2023–present) ===
On August 22, 2023, it was announced that a 24-hour Adult Swim channel would launch in Latin America in October 2023. On September 3, it was announced that Adult Swim would replace TruTV on October 31.

== Programming blocks ==
A classic cartoons block, Checkered Past, was launched August 28, 2023 in the United States. It airs classic Cartoon Network programming including Dexter's Laboratory, Cow and Chicken, Courage the Cowardly Dog, and Ed, Edd n Eddy.
