= Vivir Viver =

Defunct Spanish-Portuguese cable television channel

Vivir Viver (also Viver Vivir, later Canal Viver) was a Spanish-Portuguese cable television channel that existed between 1998 and 2006.

The channel was founded by journalist Miguel Campo Vidal and started test broadcasts in early 1998 with a looped promo announcing its launch for February, which was ultimately delayed to 1 April. It had offices in Madrid, Barcelona and Lisbon and was conceived as a family-oriented lifestyle channel, with topics including health, food, cooking, DIY, fashion, art, sports and free time. One of its Portuguese presenters at the beginning was Ana Brito e Cunha.

By mid-October 1999, its programming was available terrestrially on the Tele Voz stations in Galicia, owned by La Voz de Galicia. In May 2002, it started airing Motoríssimo, produced in Porto. In 2004, the commercial control of the channel was occupied by Marcelo Reis, a Brazilian-born radio personality.

The channel was best known for time-sharing on weekend nights with Íntimo, a pornographic television channel. In 2003, channel vice-president Rui Botica Santos was unaware of the new Portuguese television law, which oversaw the scrambling of all porn content on television, comparing it to the age of Prohibition in the United States. Since two adult programs airing on Vivir Viver, Strip and Consultório Sentimental, were not targeted by the new law, he admitted that these would lure more viewers to the channel. A 2005 Marktest study showed that Viver was the most searched channel on Friday nights, among the adult channels, with 8,8% of overall ratings in a week.

In June 2006, TV Cabo announced that it was going to remove the channel on 30 June, justified by low ratings and the lack of the quality of its programming. It was initially supposed to be replaced by Porto Canal, but was eventually replaced by a Portuguese version of Infinito, with French channel XXL, on the digital service, replacing Íntimo on a separate channel.
