= Warner Bros. Discovery Americas =

Entertainment media company

Skydance Latin America and Caribbean
- Type: Division
- Industry: Entertainment
- Predecessors: HBO Latin America Group (1991–2020); Turner Broadcasting System Latin America (1991–2020); WarnerMedia Latin America (2020–2022); Warner Bros. Discovery Latin America (2022-2026); Discovery Networks Latin America (1994–2021); Discovery Latin America (2021–2022); MTV Networks Latin America (1993–2011); Viacom International Media Networks The Americas (2011–2019); ViacomCBS Networks Americas (2019–2022); Paramount Networks Americas (2022–2026)
- Founded: March 9, 1993; 33 years ago
- Founder: Ted Turner; John S. Hendricks
- Headquarters: Miami, United States; Bogotá, Colombia; Buenos Aires, Argentina; Mexico City, Mexico; Santiago, Chile; São Paulo, Brazil
- Area served: Latin America and the Caribbean
- Key people: Fernando Medin (president); Tomás Yankelevich (Lifestyle, factual and entertainment director); Pablo Zuccarino (kids & family director); Vera Buzanello (head of revenue; country manager, Brazil); Felipe de Stefani (country manager, Argentina); Gustavo Minaker (country manager, Chile); Patricia Jasin (country manager, Colombia)
- Products: Entertainment
- Services: Production; Distribution
- Owner: Skydance
- Parent: Skydance Global Content Sales
- Divisions: Imagen Satelital S.A.; Skydance Chile
- Subsidiaries: Raze; Redknot (50% with Nelvana); Ole Distribution (50% with Ole Communications); TIS Productions
- Website: https://latamwbd.com/ (Archived February 25, 2026, now redirects to skydance.com)

Skydance Latin America and Caribbean is a company managing a collection of pay television networks and other services in Latin America.

Warner Bros. Discovery was created in April 2022, bringing together WarnerMedia Latin America (founded in 1993 as Turner Broadcasting System Latin America), Discovery Latin America (founded on August 1, 1994), and Paramount Networks Americas (founded on 1993, as MTV Networks). Warner Bros. Discovery Latin America offers "a portfolio of channels, led by Discovery Channel and others networks, that are distributed in every pay TV market in the Latin America". The division offers 22 channels and operates sports in two languages (Spanish and Portuguese for Brazil) with "channel feeds customized according needs of advertising and sales opportunities".

Final logo as Warner Bros. Discovery Latin America until October 6, 2026

== Current assets ==
=== Movie channels ===
- HBO (Latin America)
  - HBO 2
  - HBO Family
  - HBO Signature
  - HBO+
  - HBO Mundi
  - HBO Pop
  - HBO Xtreme

=== News ===
- CNN Brasil (licensed to Novus Media)
- CNN Chile (licensed to Carey Media)
- CNN en Español (except Brazil and Cuba; also in the United States)
- CNN International (distribution)
- CNN US (distribution)
- HLN (distribution)

=== Kids & Family Group ===
- Cartoon Network
- Cartoonito
- Discovery Kids
- Nickelodeon
  - Nick Jr
- Tooncast

=== Sports ===
- TNT Sports
  - TNT Sports Argentina
  - TNT Sports Brazil
  - TNT Sports Chile
  - TNT Sports Mexico

=== Entertainment, Factual & Lifestyle Group ===
- TNT Latin America
  - TNT Novelas
  - TNT Series
- Adult Swim
- TCM (Latin America)
- Space
- Warner Channel
- Animal Planet
- Discovery Channel
  - Discovery Home & Health
  - Discovery Science
  - Discovery Theater
  - Discovery Turbo
  - Discovery World
- HTV
- Food Network
- HGTV
- Investigation Discovery
- CMT (10% co-owned with Corus Entertainment)
- Comedy Central
- MTV
- Smithsonian Channel (6.67% co-owned with Blue Ant Media)
- TLC

== Former assets ==
=== Closed ===
- Retro (replaced by TCM or TruTV, depending on the cable provider, on April 1, 2009)
- Infinito (replaced by TNT Series on March 10, 2015)
- Discovery Civilization (replaced by HGTV in Brazil on November 5, 2019, and closed on January 3, 2022, in Latin America)
- Boomerang (replaced by Cartoonito on December 1, 2021)
- TBS (replaced by TNT Novelas on June 26, 2023)
- TruTV (replaced by Adult Swim on October 31, 2023)
- Glitz (joint venture with Cisneros Media) (closed on April 5, 2024)
- I.Sat (closed on April 1, 2024)
- MuchMusic (closed on March 15, 2024)

=== Divested ===
- Chilevisión (sold to Paramount Networks Americas in 2021; currently owned by Vytal Group Ltd.)
- Crunchyroll Latin America – sold to Sony Pictures Television in 2021
- Mega Media (27.5% with Bethia)
  - Mega
  - Mega 2
  - Mega Ficción
  - Mega Plus
  - ETC – sold to 2BeNamed in March 2026
- Particular Crowd (spun off in 2023)
- Golf Channel

== Divisions ==
Imagen Satelital S.A. (formerly Turner Internacional Argentina) is an Argentine commercial broadcasting company headquartered in Buenos Aires and founded in 1990. It is a subsidiary of Warner Bros. Discovery Americas. The company was bought by Claxson Interactive Group in 1997, which later sold the group to Turner Broadcasting System in 2007.

== See also ==
- Warner Bros. Discovery Asia-Pacific
- Warner Bros. Discovery EMEA
- Ole Distribution
