= Retro (TV channel) =

Defunct television channel

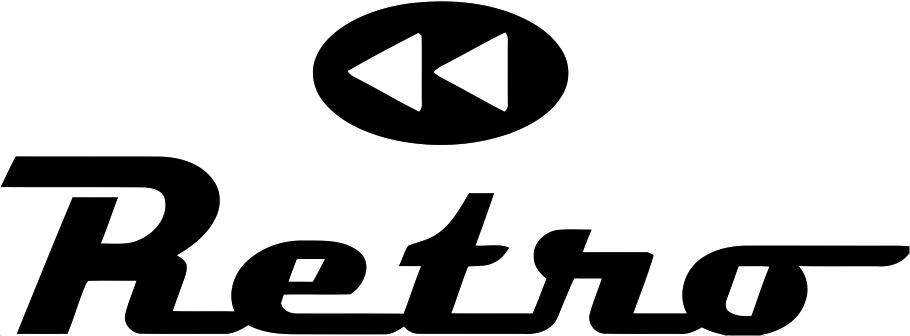
- Country: Argentina
- Broadcast area: Latin America
- Headquarters: Buenos Aires, Argentina

Programming
- Language: Spanish
- Picture format: 480i (SDTV)

Ownership
- Owner: Claxson Interactive Group (2003–2007); Turner Broadcasting System (a WarnerMedia Company) (2007–2009)
- Sister channels: Space; I.Sat; TCM; Cartoon Network

History
- Launched: February 28, 2003
- Replaced: Uniseries
- Closed: April 1, 2009
- Replaced by: truTV

Retro was a Latin American cable television network with classic programming that included movies and popular classic TV Series. It was owned by Turner Broadcasting System Latin America, a unit of WarnerMedia. Its headquarters were located in Buenos Aires, Argentina.

On March 25, 2009, Turner Broadcasting System announced the replacement of Retro by a Latin American version of the channel truTV, also owned by Turner Broadcasting System. Most of the programming from Retro is still being aired on TCM Classic Entertainment.

On April 1, 2009 at 5:30am (Buenos Aires time), the channel aired its last show, the Robotech episode "Symphony of Light". Retro was replaced by truTV at 6am.

In some countries of Latin America, some cable television companies opted to replace Retro with TCM Classic Entertainment instead of truTV.

== Programming ==
- Thunderbirds
- The Dukes of Hazzard
- Knight Rider
- Robotech
- Bonanza
- Little House on the Prairie
- The Outer Limits
- The Saint
- Columbo
- The Persuaders!
- Three Stooges
- The Prisoner
