= Discovery Civilization / Civilisation Channel =

Discovery Civilization or Discovery Civilisation may refer to:

- Discovery Civilization (Latin America), a Latin American channel
- Discovery History, a UK television channel formerly known as Discovery Civilisation from 1999 to 2007
- Discovery Science (Canada), formerly known as Discovery Civilization Channel from 2001 to 2010
- Discovery World (international TV channel), a European television channel known as Discovery Civilisation from 1999 to 2008
- Investigation Discovery, a U.S. cable television network known as Discovery Civilization from 1999 to 2003
