= Psiconautas =

- Genre: Comedy
- Country of origin: Argentina
- Original language: Spanish

Production
- Running time: 30 minutes (including commercials)

Original release
- Network: TBS
- Release: 18 April – 29 April 2016
- Network: Netflix
- Release: 15 April 2018

Psiconautas is an Argentine television comedy series, revolving around a Spanish hustler, who pretends to be a psychotherapist to a group of misfits to earn money. The first season debuted on Canal TBS in April 2016. The second season was picked up by Netflix and debuted in April 2018.

== Cast ==
- Willy Toledo as Roberto
- Gabriel Goity as Gorsky
- Julieta Zylberberg as Jessica
- Martín Piroyansky as Axel
- Florencia Peña as Fabiana
- Luis Ziembrowski as Coco
- Verónica Llinás as Emilce
- Emilio Disi as Giacomo
- Malena Villa as Debbie
