= Final 24 =

Canadian television series

- Directed by: Mike Parkinson
- Narrated by: Dave McRae (Canada); Danny Wallace (United Kingdom)
- Country of origin: Canada

Production
- Executive producers: Glen Salzman; Simon Lloyd
- Producers: Oksana Borowik; Kathryn Buck
- Running time: 60 mins.

Original release
- Network: Discovery Channel/Global Television Network (Canada); A&E Biography, Current TV (United States); Fox (United Kingdom)
- Release: April 16, 2006 – 2007

Final 24 is a Canadian documentary series which airs on the Discovery Channel, Global Television Network, and OWN. Released in Canada in 2006, the series chronicles the last 24 hours of the lives of famous celebrities of the late 20th century. The series was narrated by Canadian voice artist Dave McRae for a US release in 2007 on the Biography Channel and by Danny Wallace in the UK.

== Episodes ==
=== Season 1 ===
Episode No.	Celebrity	Date of death	Age at death	Cause of death
1	Sid Vicious	February 2, 1979	21	Drug overdose (heroin)
2	John Belushi	March 5, 1982	33	Drug overdose (speedball)
3	River Phoenix	October 31, 1993	23	Drug-induced heart failure
4	Hunter S. Thompson	February 20, 2005	67	Suicide
5	Marvin Gaye	April 1, 1984	44	Murder (shot by his father)
6	John F. Kennedy Jr.	July 16, 1999	38	Plane crash

=== Season 2 ===
Episode No.	Celebrity	Date of death	Age at death	Cause of death
1	Keith Moon	September 7, 1978	32	Drug overdose (heminevrin)
2	Anna Nicole Smith	February 8, 2007	39	Accidental drug overdose (chloral hydrate)
3	Janis Joplin	October 4, 1970	27	Drug overdose (heroin)
4	Gianni Versace	July 15, 1997	50	Murder (shot by Andrew Cunanan)
5	Nicole Brown Simpson	June 12, 1994	35	Murder (stabbed to death, widely believed as victim of acquitted O. J. Simpson)
6	Jim Morrison	July 3, 1971	27	Heart failure
7	David Koresh	April 19, 1993	33	Gunshot to the head during the Waco siege
8	Tupac Shakur	September 13, 1996	25	Murder (shot multiple times in a drive by shooting)

== International broadcasters ==
- Argentina/Latin America - Infinito
- Australia - Seven HD - 10.30pm Mondays.
- Austria, Germany and Switzerland - Servus TV
- Germany - ZDFneo
- United Kingdom - Fox
- United States - The Biography Channel, Current TV
- Greece - ET3
- Italy - Discovery World
- Poland - Discovery World
- Romania - Investigation Discovery
- Hungary - Discovery World
