= Ninjin =

Brazilian animated series

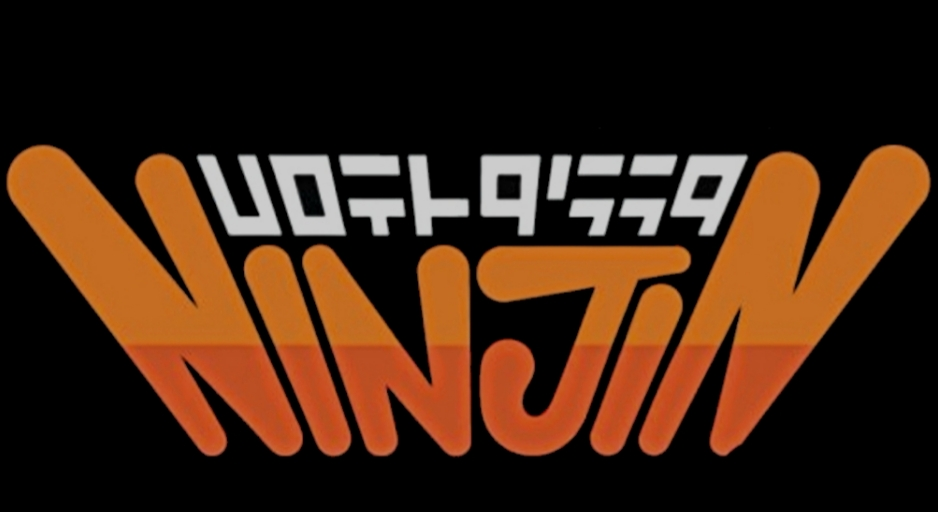
- Genre: Adventure, Slapstick
- Created by: Pocket Trap & Roger Keesse
- Based on: Ninjin: Clash of Carrots By Pocket Trap
- Written by: Roger Keesse
- Directed by: Anderson Lister
- Voices of: Carol Valença; Vii Zedek; Luiza Porto; Alfredo Rollo
- Country of origin: Brazil
- Original language: Portuguese
- No. of seasons: 1
- No. of episodes: 22

Production
- Executive producers: Luciana Eguti; Paulo Muppet; Henrique Caprino; Roger Keesse
- Producer: Bruno Mafra
- Running time: 1 / 3 / 7 minutes
- Production companies: Birdo Studio; Pocket Trap; Cartoon Network

Original release
- Network: Cartoon Network
- Release: September 4, 2019 – June 9, 2021

Ninjin is the second original animated series from Cartoon Network Brazil (after Jorel's Brother), co-produced by Pocket Trap and Birdo Studio, based on the 2018 game Ninjin: Clash of Carrots.

The series was created by Pocket Trap and Roger Keesse, premiering on September 4, 2019 on Cartoon Network.

The official trailer was published on the Twitter platform on Cartoon Network Brazil's official account on September 2, 2019.

The first season consists of 22 episodes.

The first-season episodes are divided into three formats: 10 episodes with 1 minute, 7 episodes with 3 minutes and finally, the five-episode miniseries with 7 minutes.

The series were also aired on Cartoon Network in Latin America, Portugal and Boing in Spain.

The series was not renewed for a second season and was scrubbed from Cartoon Network Latin America's YouTube channels and HBO Max Latin America.

== Characters ==
- Ninjin (voiced by Carol Valença) is a male rabbit who wants to be a great ninja learning from Sensei, like his ancient ancestors. Has a large wooden sword with a broken tip as a weapon.
- Akai (voiced by Luiza Porto) is a female fox who befriends Ninjin and Flink. She also wants to become a great kunoichi (female version of a ninja) learning their arts with Sensei. Has purple bombs as her main weapon.
- Flink (voiced by Vii Zedek) is a male frog who has skills of levitation, telekinesis and control over the elements. He's friends with Ninjin and Akai, and likes to eat carrot ramen
- Sensei (voiced by Alfredo Rollo) is an elderly rabbit who trains Ninjin, Akai and Flink to be great ninjas, despite his reluctance

=== Shogun Troop ===
- General Jam (voiced by Marco França) is a deer that commands the Shogun Moe's army

== Synopsis ==
The series tells the story of a rabbit named Ninjin, a fox named Akai and a frog named Flink, go out in search of carrots stolen from their village by the evil mole Shogun Moe.
