= Cartoon Network (Latin America) =

- Country: United States; Brazil; Mexico
- Broadcast area: Latin America and the Caribbean
- Headquarters: Atlanta, Georgia, United States; Mexico City, Mexico; Buenos Aires, Argentina; Bogotá, Colombia; Santiago, Chile; São Paulo, Brazil

Programming
- Languages: Portuguese; Spanish; English (available in SAP only)
- Picture format: 1080i HDTV (rescaled to 16:9 480i/576i for SDTV feed)

Ownership
- Owner: Skydance Latin America and Carriban
- Sister channels: Cartoonito; Tooncast; Discovery Kids; Adult Swim

History
- Launched: April 30, 1993; 33 years ago

Cartoon Network is a Latin American pay television channel distributed by Skydance Corporation for the Latin American audience and the Caribbean. It is the Latin American version of the original Cartoon Network television channel in the United States. It is divided into two feeds: two are in Spanish (Mexico/Pan-Latin America and Caribbean), and the other is in Portuguese for Brazil. The feeds have different schedules.

It primarily airs cartoons and animated programming, marketed towards children and adolescents. Operated in Argentina by Skydance Latin America and Carriban, it began broadcasting on April 30, 1993.

== History ==
In March 1993, Turner Broadcasting announced the start of broadcasts to Latin America, in conjunction with its plan to launch in Europe. Cartoon Network began broadcasting in Latin America on April 30, 1993. Although much is not known about its first broadcast in the region, it was, during its first years, similar to its U.S. counterpart, whose programming focused solely on the classic cartoons of the Turner Entertainment film library, made up of studios Hanna-Barbera, MGM, Warner Bros., and Fleischer Studios. Its programming and branding used at that time were the same as the U.S. feed, with the difference that between 1993 and 1995, the Latin American feed was just a Spanish-language feed from the United States, which was broadcast exclusively to the region. It was not until 1996 that this feed became completely independent of the US feed, and thus began to have its own programming with its own schedules, as well as new worldwide acquisitions for the channel.

In 1996, it began broadcasting its first original series, beginning with Space Ghost Coast to Coast, an original reinvention of Hanna-Barbera's superhero, which gained the popularity of adult audiences. In addition, new original channel series were incorporated at that time, known as Cartoon Cartoons: Dexter's Laboratory, Johnny Bravo, Cow and Chicken, I Am Weasel, The Powerpuff Girls and Ed, Edd n Eddy, which became the channel's flagship series.

The first edition of Copa Toon (initially named Copa Toon América) was held in July 1999, coinciding with that year's Copa América. It consisted in a fictional competition with eight theams with characters from the channel, represented daily by two 30-minute series, as well as marathons lasting between two and seven hours in the last three days. The event had the participation of sports journalists Víctor Hugo Morales (Latin American feed) and Toño de Valdés (Mexican feed), who narrated the highlights of each episode. The soccer special featured the cast of Space Ghost, whose theme was to interview several personalities from the world of sports and soccer, in addition to presenting a fictional tournament between the teams of the channel's series.

In 2001, it launched its new sister channel Boomerang, at that time, a new channel that would be dedicated solely to broadcast of classic Hanna-Barbera cartoons that no longer aired in the programming of the main channel due to the arrival of new series. This channel had already been launched in 2000 in the United States, and until then, it was also a block broadcast in the main channel. The channel observed its tenth anniversary with Del yunque a la Sustancia X (From Anvil to Chemical X), airing on April 30, 2003.

On 1 January 2005, Cartoon Network introduced a new logo along with a new visual branding known as the "CN City", with a new slogan We know what you really like (Spanish: Sabemos lo que realmente te gusta; Portuguese: Nós sabemos do que você realmente gosta). and with this rebrand, Cartoon Network introduced new original series such as Foster's Home for Imaginary Friends, besides new acquisitions and programming blocks. In October of the same year, the Adult Swim block was released in Latin America after 4 years of its original launch in the United States. The block debuted due to the popularity of the TV series Space Ghost Coast to Coast, one of the first programs of the channel aimed exclusively at this audience.

In April 2008, Cartoon Network presented its new locally produced content, a new campaign with a new image and a complete redesign of its websites. After these changes, the Adult Swim block was removed from the channel due to Jim Samples resigning in 2007 and the Programming Manager Cindy Kerr also leaving being succeeded by Pablo Zuccarino. However, the block continued to be broadcast by I.Sat until December 2010; years later, the block returned to the same channel in April 2015 until April 2020, when this block was moved to Warner Channel.

In June and August 2010, the channel began to use small idents with the logo in white and with the Toonix characters (similar to the Noods of the United States) originally promoting the 2010 Soccer World Cup. In September 2010, the Toonix era became official, using small ads and promotional campaigns similar to those used by the Noods era of Cartoon Network, from August 2008 to June 2010.

On January 1, 2012, the channel launched a new logo and visual identity. In March 2012, its high-definition simulcast was launched. However, the launch of the new feed could not take place, as its distribution was still under negotiation with other cable operators in the region.

The network incorporated a new age rating system notices, identifying the type of content and what type of viewers could watch. In April 2013, the channel began its 20th-anniversary celebrations. Several Turner channels joined in the celebration, including Warner, TruTV, I.Sat, Boomerang, TNT, TCM and Tooncast. With this, the channel's TV series were broadcast in those channels for that month. The celebration took place again in September, celebrating the 21st anniversary of the American signal, this time with the premiere of Teen Titans Go!.

On January 23, 2014, the Panregional and South Atlantic feeds merged, causing the establishment of the Argentine schedule in the same feed, being one of the two official times of the feed, along with the Colombian. On August 4, 2014, the channel began the "Check It 3.0" era branding (known in Latin America as "Cartoon Network Renovado") and, also, it changed its aspect ratio from 4:3 to 16:9 in all its feeds. Cartoon Network's HD feed was launched in Mexico on November 28, 2014, being Axtel the first cable operator to acquire the feed. It was an HD simulcast of the channel's Mexico feed.

On June 1, 2015, the South Atlantic feed was separated from the Panregional feed, the latter being divided in two, leading to the creation of new independent feeds for the general public. These were the North Atlantic feed (available for Colombia, Venezuela, Central America and the Caribbean) and the Pacific feed (available for Chile, Peru, Ecuador and Bolivia); this was done for the purpose of launching new individual high-definition feeds throughout the region. On August 3, new bumpers were shown depicting children imitating their favourite characters; this event was named a sub-rebrand of the Check it 3.0 era listed as 3.5. For this purpose, CN Blah!, a mobile app, was launched.

On January 4, 2016, the channel introduced a new visual identity, the "Check it 4.0" era. On January 2, 2017, Cartoon Network began using the "Dimensional" era with new branding in the ads of the programming blocks Ja, Ja, Ja/Ha, Ha, Ha (Brazil), Heroes (Héroes/Heróis) and Cine Cartoon, and the introduction of new bumpers and the premiere of Mighty Magiswords, and Justice League Action. The channel celebrated its 25th anniversary on April 30, 2018, and a block was created to commemorate it. The block "Que No Pare la Fiesta"/"Que Não Pare a Festa" was broadcast in April and September to commemorate the channel's 25th anniversary.

On April 1, 2022, it introduced the "Redraw Your World" era with new branding and a new typeface. On November 7, 2023, it rebranded to the "Pastel" era.

On August 15, 2026, Warner Bros. Discovery announced that Mexican feed was switched to the Panregional feed on September 1, 2026, while the Brazilian feed still remains.

== Programming ==
The channel primarily airs shows and animated series, both original to Cartoon Network and others which have been acquired from outside networks.

10 of the 15 most popular shows among children aged 6-to-10 years old were broadcast by Cartoon Network Latin America, including The Powerpuff Girls, Dexter's Laboratory, Cow and Chicken, Johnny Bravo and I Am Weasel. Older franchises like Scooby-Doo, Tom and Jerry and Looney Tunes were also broadcast, as well as popular global anime franchises like Pokémon and newest original series such as the Ben 10 franchise, Adventure Time, Regular Show, The Amazing World of Gumball, Steven Universe and The Powerpuff Girls reboot. Cartoon Network Latin America has also aired original productions and live-action series such as La CQ and Use Sua Voz. the channel's first original Mexican live-action series which premiered in 2012. In 2014, the channel acquired Digimon Fusion and Power Rangers Megaforce in a partnership with Saban Brands, and both series premiered on the channel in May 2014.

=== Current programming ===
Original programming from Cartoon Network Studios

- Apple & Onion (May 1, 2018)
- Craig of the Creek (June 16, 2018)
- Steven Universe (April 7, 2014)
- We Baby Bears (January 2, 2022)
- We Bare Bears (August 24, 2015)

Original programming from Warner Bros. Animation

- Jellystone!
- Looney Tunes Cartoons
- Scooby-Doo and Guess Who? (November 7, 2019)
- Teen Titans Go! (September 2, 2013)
- Tom and Jerry in New York
- Tom and Jerry Gokko
- Animaniacs
- My Adventures with Superman

Original programming from Hanna-Barbera Studios Europe

- The Amazing World of Gumball (September 4, 2011)
- The Heroic Quest of the Valiant Prince Ivandoe

Acquired programming

- Big Blue
- Total DramaRama (May 10, 2019)
- The Croods: Family Tree
- Pinecone & Pony
- The Boss Baby: Back in the Crib
- Megamind Rules!
- Summer Memories

Local shows

These shows were produced in the countries covered by Cartoon Network Latin America.

- Any Malu Show (May 4, 2020)
- Jorel's Brother (February 2, 2015)
- Monica's Gang (June 27, 2004)
- The (Sur)real World of Any Malu (March 16, 2019)
- Toontubers (July 23, 2016)
- Villainous (October 29, 2021)

Cartoonito shows

- Batwheels
- Bugs Bunny Builders
- Lucas the Spider
- Thomas & Friends: All Engines Go

=== Former programming ===
- The 13 Ghosts of Scooby-Doo
- 2 Stupid Dogs
- 31 Minutos
- 5'+: 5 Minutitos Mas
- 6teen
- Ace Ventura: Pet Detective
- Acme Hour
- The Addams Family
- Adventure Time
- Adult Swim (Then in I.Sat and TBS)
  - 12 oz. Mouse
  - Adult Swim Shorts
  - Aqua Teen Hunger Force
  - Baby Blues
  - Bob and Margaret
  - The Brak Show
  - Bromwell High
  - Bro'Town
  - Clone High
  - Ga-Ra-Ku-Ta: Mr. Stain on Junk Alley
  - Harvey Birdman, Attorney at Law
  - Home Movies
  - John Callahan's Quads!
  - Mission Hill
  - The Oblongs
  - Odd Job Jack
  - Robot Chicken
  - Sealab 2021
  - Space Ghost Coast To Coast
  - Squidbillies
  - Stroker and Hoop
  - Undergrads
  - The Venture Bros.
- The Adventures of Rocky and Bullwinkle and Friends
- The Adventures of Don Coyote and Sancho Panda
- The Adventures of Figaro Pho
- The Adventures of Tintin
- The Amazing Chan and the Chan Clan
- Angelo Rules (season 1 & 2 only)
- Angel's Friends
- Animaniacs
- The Animatrix
- Another Week on Cartoon
- The Archies
- As Aventuras de Gui & Estopa
- Ashita no Nadja
- Astro Boy
- Atom Ant
- Atomic Betty
- Augie Doggie and Doggie Daddy
- The Baby Huey Show
- Baby Looney Tunes
- Bakugan: Battle Brawlers
- Bakugan: Gundalian Invaders
- Bakugan: Mechtanium Surge
- Bakugan: New Vestroia
- The Banana Splits
- Barbie: It Takes Two
- Barney Bear
- The Batman
- Batman Beyond
- Batman: The Animated Series
- Batman: The Brave and the Bold
- Be Cool, Scooby-Doo!
- Beast Boy: Lone Wolf
- Beast Wars: Transformers
- Beetlejuice
- Being Ian
- Ben 10
- Ben 10 (2016)
- Ben 10: Alien Force
- Ben 10: Omniverse
- Ben 10: Ultimate Alien
- Betty Toons
- Beyblade Burst
- Beyblade Burst Turbo
- Big Bag
- Birdman and the Galaxy Trio
- Blazing Team
- Blondie
- Blue Dragon
- Bratz
- BraveStarr
- Breezly and Sneezly
- Buddy Buddy... A Dog's Life!
- Buford and the Galloping Ghost
- The Bugs Bunny and Tweety Show
- The Bugs Bunny Show
- Bugs 'n' Daffy
- Bunnicula
- Butch Cassidy and the Sundance Kids
- Camp Lazlo
- Captain Caveman and the Teen Angels
- Captain Planet and the Planeteers
- Captain Scarlet and the Mysterons
- Captain Simian & the Space Monkeys
- Captain Tsubasa: Road to 2002
- Captain Tsubasa
- Cardcaptor Sakura
- Carl2
- Carrapatos and Catapultas
- Cartoon Planet
- Casper the Friendly Ghost
- Casper's Scare School
- Cave Kids
- The Centurions
- Challenge of the Super Friends
- Chop Socky Chooks
- Chowder
- Cinderella Boy
- Clarence
- Cloudy with a Chance of Meatballs: The Series
- Clue Club
- Coconut Fred's Fruit Salad Island
- Codename: Kids Next Door
- The Completely Mental Misadventures of Ed Grimley
- Copa Toon
- Corneil and Bernie
- Corrector Yui
- Courage the Cowardly Dog
- Cow and Chicken
- Cyberchase
- Cyborg 009
- Darkstalkers
- Dastardly and Muttley in Their Flying Machines
- DC Super Hero Girls
- DC Superhero Girls (2015)
- DC Nation
- Delilah and Julius
- Delta State
- Destroy Build Destroy
- Detention
- Detentionaire
- Dexter's Laboratory
- Digimon Fusion
- Dink, the Little Dinosaur
- Dino Boy in the Lost Valley
- Dorothy and the Wizard of Oz
- Dr. Dimensionpants
- Dr. Stone
- Dragon Ball
- Dragon Ball Z
- Dragon Ball Z Kai
- Dragon Ball GT
- Dragon Ball Super
- Dragon Ball Z Kai: The Final Chapters
- Dragon Ball Daima
- Dragons: Defenders of Berk
- Droopy
- Droopy, Master Detective
- Duck Dodgers
- Dude, What Would Happen
- Dudley Do-Right
- Duel Masters
- The Dukes of Broxstonia
- The Dumb Bunnies
- Dumb and Dumber
- Dynomutt, Dog Wonder
- Ed, Edd n Eddy
- Edgar & Ellen
- Eliot Kid
- El Chavo Animado
- El Chavo (Live-Action Series)
- El Chapulín Colorado (Live-Action Series)
- Endangered Species
- Evil Con Carne
- Experimentos Extraordinários (Live-Action series, exclusive for Brazil)
- Exosquad
- Extreme Dinosaurs
- Extreme Ghostbusters
- Fangface
- Fantastic Four (1967)
- Fantastic Four: World's Greatest Heroes
- Fantastic Voyage
- Fantastic Max
- Felix the Cat
- Fievel's American Tails
- The Flintstones
- The Flintstones Kids
- Fortune Dogs
- Foster's Home for Imaginary Friends
- Four Eyes!
- Frankenstein Jr. and the Impossibles
- Freakazoid!
- Front Row
- The Funky Phantom
- Futz!
- Gakkō no Kaidan
- Galtar and the Golden Lance
- Garfield and Friends
- The Garfield Show
- Gaturro
- Gerald McBoing-Boing
- Generator Rex
- George of the Jungle
- G-Force: Guardians of Space
- Girlstuff/Boystuff
- Godzilla (1978)
- Godzilla: The Series
- The Great Grape Ape
- Green Lantern: The Animated Series
- The Grim Adventures of Billy & Mandy
- Grim & Evil
- Grizzy & the Lemmings
- Grojband
- Gundam Wing
- Gundam Wing: Endless Waltz
- Hamtaro
- Haunted Tales for Wicked Kids
- He-Man and the Masters of the Universe
- He-Man and the Masters of the Universe (2002)
- Hello Kitty's Paradise
- Help!... It's the Hair Bear Bunch!
- The Herculoids
- Hero: 108
- Hero Inside
- The High Fructose Adventures of Annoying Orange
- Hi Hi Puffy AmiYumi
- The Hillbilly Bears
- Histeria!
- Hokey Wolf
- Hoot Kloot
- Hong Kong Phooey
- Hot Wheels Battle Force 5
- Huckleberry Hound
- I Elvis Riboldi
- I Am Weasel
- Infinity Train
- Inch High, Private Eye
- The Inspector
- Inspector Gadget
- InuYasha
- Jabberjaw
- Jackie Chan Adventures
- Jacob Two-Two
- James Bond Jr.
- Jeannie
- The Jetsons
- Johnny Bravo
- Johnny Test
- Jonny Quest
- Josie and the Pussycats
- Josie and the Pussycats in Outer Space
- Juaco vs. Paco (exclusive for Colombia and Venezuela)
- Jumanji
- The Jungle Bunch
- The Jungle Bunch: News Beat
- Justice League
- Justice League: Unlimited
- Justice League Action
- Kaleido Star
- Kamen Rider: Dragon Knight
- Kangaroo Creek Gang
- Karate Kid
- Keep Your Hands Off Eizouken!'
- Kimba the White Lion
- King
- King Arthur's Disasters
- Krypto the Superdog
- The Kwicky Koala Show
- La CQ (Live-Action Series)
- Laff-A-Lympics
- Laid-Back Camp
- Larva
- Las Aventuras de Papelucho
- Lavender Castle
- Lamput
- Legends of Chima
- Legion of Super Heroes
- Lego Nexo Knights
- Les Jules, chienne de vie...
- Level Up (Live-Action Series)
- The Life and Times of Juniper Lee
- Lippy the Lion & Hardy Har Har
- The Little Lulu Show
- Little Ellen
- Long Live the Royals
- Loonatics Unleashed
- Looney Tunes
- The Looney Tunes Show
- New Looney Tunes (formerly Wabbit)
- Loopy De Loop
- Looped
- Love Hina
- Mao Mao: Heroes of Pure Heart
- MAD
- The Magilla Gorilla Show
- The Marvelous Misadventures of Flapjack
- Marvo the Wonder Chicken
- Marcus Level
- The Mask
- Master Raindrop
- Max Steel
- Max Steel (2013 series)
- Mecard
- Megas XLR
- Men in Black: The Series
- Merrie Melodies
- Mew Mew Power
- The Mighty Hercules
- Mighty Magiswords
- Mike, Lu & Og
- Mirmo Zibang
- Mixels
- Moby Dick and Mighty Mightor
- Mob Psycho 100
- Mona the Vampire
- Monica Teen (exclusive for Brazil)
- Monster Force
- Monkey Typhoon
- Monk Little Dog
- The Moxy Show
- Mr. Bean
- The Mr. Magoo Show
- Mr. Men Show
- Mr. Spim's Cartoon Theatre
- Mr. Young (Live-Action Series)
- ¡Mucha Lucha!
- The Mumbly Cartoon Show
- My Dad the Rock Star
- My Gym Partner's a Monkey
- Naruto
- Ned's Newt
- The New Adventures of Superman
- The New Batman Adventures
- The New Scooby-Doo Movies
- The All-New Scooby and Scrappy-Doo Show
- The New Woody Woodpecker Show
- Ninjin
- Ninja Express
- Norman Normal
- Numb Chucks
- Oddbods
- Oggy and the Cockroaches
- Ōgon Bat
- OK K.O.! Let's Be Heroes
- One Piece
- Oscar's Oasis
- Oswaldo
- Over the Garden Wall
- Ozzy & Drix
- Pac-Man
- Papo Animado com Marcelo Tas (Exclusive for Brazil)
- Partridge Family 2200 A.D.
- Paw Paws
- Pecola
- The Perils of Penelope Pitstop
- Pet Alien
- Peter Potamus
- Phantom Investigators
- The Pink Panther
- Pink Panther and Pals
- Pink Panther and Sons
- The Pink Panther Show
- Pinky and the Brain
- Pinky, Elmyra & the Brain
- The Pirates of Dark Water
- Pixcodelics
- Pixie and Dixie and Mr. Jinks
- Planet Sketch
- Plankton Invasion
- Plastic Man
- Pleasant Goat and Big Big Wolf
- Popeye
- Popolocrois
- Pound Puppies
- Power Rangers Dino Charge
- Power Rangers Megaforce
- Power Rangers Ninja Steel
- The Powerpuff Girls (1998)
- The Powerpuff Girls
- Powerpuff Girls Z
- Precious Pupp
- A Pup Named Scooby-Doo
- Quick Draw McGraw
- The Qpiz
- Radiant
- Ragnarok the Animation (only in Brazil)
- Ranma ½
- Ratz
- Rave Master
- The Real Adventures of Jonny Quest
- The Real Ghostbusters
- Redakai: Conquer the Kairu
- Richie Rich
- Ricochet Rabbit & Droop-a-Long
- Robotboy
- RoboCop: Alpha Commando
- The Roman Holidays
- Roswell Conspiracies: Aliens, Myths and Legends
- Sailor Moon (only in Brazil)
- Saint Seiya
- Saint Seiya: Hades Jūnikyū-hen
- Sakura Wars
- Samurai Champloo
- Samurai Jack
- Samurai X
- Santapprentice
- Santo vs The Clones
- The Savage Dragon
- Scaredy Squirrel
- Scooby and Scrappy-Doo
- Scooby-Doo! Mystery Incorporated
- Scooby-Doo, Where Are You!
- Secret Saturdays
- Secret Squirrel
- Shadow Raiders
- Shaggy & Scooby-Doo Get a Clue!
- Shazzan
- Sheep in the Big City
- SheZow
- Shirt Tales
- Sidekick
- Sítio do Picapau Amarelo (2012-2018)
- Sitting Ducks
- Small World
  - The Adventures of Marco and Gina
  - Angelina Ballerina
  - Babar
  - The Berenstain Bears
  - Caillou
  - Dennis the Menace
  - Dragon Tales
  - Franklin
  - Horseland
  - Kipper
  - Miss Spider's Sunny Patch Friends
  - The Mr. Men Show
  - Percy the Park Keeper
  - Pingu
  - Sagwa, the Chinese Siamese Cat
  - Spider!
  - The Babaloos
- The Smurfs
- Snagglepuss
- Snooper and Blabber
- Snorks
- Sonic Boom
- Space Ghost
- Space Ghost Coast to Coast
- The Spectacular Spider-Man
- Speed Buggy
- Speed Racer
- Speed Racer X
- Spider-Man: The New Animated Series
- Spider Riders
- Squiddly Diddly
- Squirrel Boy
- Staines Down Drains
- Star Wars: Clone Wars
- Star Wars: The Clone Wars
- Static Shock
- Stoked
- Storm Hawks
- Strawberry Shortcake
- Street Fighter
- Street Fighter II V
- Street Football
- Summer Camp Island
- Super Doll Licca-chan
- Super Friends
- Superman (1988)
- Superman: The Animated Series
- Supernoobs
- SWAT Kats: The Radical Squadron
- The Sylvester & Tweety Mysteries
- Sym-Bionic Titan
- Taz-Mania
- Taffy
- Team Galaxy
- Teen Titans
- The Tex Avery Show
- Thumb Wrestling Federation
- Thundarr the Barbarian
- ThunderCats
- ThunderCats
- ThunderCats Roar
- Time Squad
- Tiny Toon Adventures
- Tiny Toons Looniversity
- Tom and Jerry
- Tom & Jerry Kids
- The Tom and Jerry Show
- The Tom and Jerry Show (2014)
- Tom and Jerry Tales
- ToonHeads
- Toonix (shorts)
- Top Cat
- Total Drama
- Total Drama Action
- Total Drama Presents: The Ridonculous Race
- Total Drama All-Stars and Pahkitew Island
- Total Drama: Revenge of the Island
- Totally Spies!
- Touché Turtle and Dum Dum
- Transformers: Animated
- Transformers: Energon
- Transformers: Prime
- Transformers: Robots in Disguise
- Transformers: Cyberverse
- Trigun
- The Triplets
- Trollkins
- Trunk Train
- The Twisted Tales of Felix the Cat
- The Twisted Whiskers Show
- Uncle Grandpa
- Underdog
- Unikitty!
- Unnatural History (live-action series)
- Viewtiful Joe
- Victor and Valentino
- Viva Piñata
- Voltron
- Wacky Races
- Wacky Races (2017)
- Wait Till Your Father Gets Home
- Wallace and Gromit
- Wally Gator
- Walter and Tandoori
- What a Cartoon!
- What's New, Scooby-Doo?
- Whatever Happened to... Robot Jones?
- Wheelie and the Chopper Bunch
- Where's Huddles?
- Winsome Witch
- Wing Commander Academy
- Winx Club
- Wonder Wheels
- Woody Woodpecker
- X-Men: Evolution
- Xiaolin Chronicles
- Xiaolin Showdown
- Yakky Doodle
- Yippee, Yappee and Yahooey
- Yo Yogi!
- Yogi Bear
- Yogi's Gang
- Yogi's Treasure Hunt
- Young Justice
- Young Robin Hood
- Yu Yu Hakusho
- Zatch Bell!
- The Zeta Project
- Zeke's Pad
- Zoids
- Zoids: Fuzors
- Zoids: Genesis
- Zoids Zero

== Services ==
Since 2007, the channel has offered different services.

=== CartoonNetworkLA.com ===
Cartoon Network Latin America started offering a website in October 1998, offering games, schedules, information on its shows and activities such as printable coloring pages.

=== Cartoon Network Mobile ===
Cartoon Network Mobile is a paid service for mobile phones, offering videos, wallpapers, games, screensavers, speech tones, ringtones and among other products.

=== Mensualidad Cartoon ===
Mensualidad Cartoon was an Argentine exclusive. It launched in August 2006 and was accessible through pre-paid collectible cards sold in retail outlets, featuring full episodes, online games and downloadable games. There was also the chance of launching it in.

== Feed structure ==
All two feeds are generated at the central headquarters in Atlanta, Georgia and also broadcast both programming and continuity in English through SAP. Despite being under this umbrella, the Brazilian feed is treated by the company as an independent channel.

- Feed 1: Panregional Feed: generated in Buenos Aires, Bogota and Mexico City, encompasses Argentina, Chile, Colombia, Mexico, Bolivia, Ecuador, Paraguay, Peru, Venezuela, Uruguay, Central America and Caribbean
- Feed 2: Brazil: generated in São Paulo (independent)

== Programming blocks ==
- JA JA JA/HA HA HA: A block that airs several comedy shows, including The Amazing World of Gumball, Apple & Onion, Craig of the Creek, Teen Titans Go! and We Bare Bears.
- Cine Cartoon: A block that airs full-length movies, both animated and live-action. It airs on weekends, with new movies premiering every Friday.
- Hora Cartoonito/Cartoonito Hour: A one-hour block that airs preschool shows from its newly launched sister channel Cartoonito like Masha and the Bear, Little Ellen, Lucas the Spider and Thomas & Friends: All Engines Go.

=== Toonami ===
On December 2, 2002, Cartoon Network premiered Toonami, replacing a similarly themed block, Talisman. Toonami aired shows that were already on the lineup, these being Gundam Wing and Pokémon, and served as the home of Inuyasha and Dragon Ball GT. Over the years, Toonami added shows such as Saint Seiya, and Yu Yu Hakusho, as well as the revamped version of Cyborg 009 and Captain Tsubasa. However, the block had to move to the late-night slots on CN Latin America, due to protests of violent scenes on the block. CN moved the block in November 2004.

In 2005, Toonami had short-lived weekend schedules, which were later replaced by Adult Swim in Latin America.

In March 2006, Toonami revamped its lineup to include more adult-oriented series, such as Love Hina, taking advantage of the schedule and the refusal of anime on Adult Swim, as well as to compete against anime channel Animax for new anime series. In June 2006, Toonami premiered anime movies in two monthly variations: Dragon Ball Theatricals (which had 17 different Dragon Ball movies), and Toonami Movies (general animated action movies).

In 2007, Cartoon Network retired Toonami. The movies were no longer aired (with the exception of the Dragon Ball movies). After its cancellation in Latin America on April 2, 2007, the block's programming gradually vanished. In January 2010, the block Animaction was created, showing on Wednesday evenings. This block broadcast both action programming and anime programming before it was removed in April 2011.

On August 18, 2020, Cartoon Network announced that the Toonami programming block was being revived in partnership with Crunchyroll. It was announced that Dragon Ball Super and Mob Psycho 100 would start airing in the one hour weeknight block. The new incarnation debuted on August 31. The block was removed on August 30, 2022.

== See also ==
- The Cartoon Network, Inc.
- Boomerang (defunct and replaced by Cartoonito)
