= HTV (Latin America) =

- Country: United States
- Broadcast area: United States, Latin America and Europe
- Headquarters: Miami, Florida

Programming
- Picture format: 1080i HDTV (downscaled to 480i/576i for the SD feed)

Ownership
- Owner: Skydance Latin America and Carriban
- Sister channels: Space; TNT; TNT Series; TNT Novelas; TCM

History
- Launched: August 1, 1995

HTV (formerly an acronym of Hispanic Television) is a Latin American pay television channel that broadcasts music videos. It is owned by Skydance Corporation and it is also available in the United States and Europe (notably Spain). It airs Latin music genres such as balada, salsa, merengue and other popular rhythms from that region, introduced by artists themselves as VJs.

The channel was first launched in 1996. In 1999, HTV was purchased by Miami-based Cisneros Television Group, which operated it as part of its CTG Music subsidiary. In 2006, Turner Broadcasting System purchased seven channels from Claxson Interactive Group including HTV. In 2010, Dish Network stopped carrying HTV in the United States.

In 2015, the Heat Latin Music Awards show, also known as Premios Heat, was launched on HTV and TBS.
