= Boomerang (Latin American TV channel) =

- Headquarters: Atlanta, Georgia, United States

Programming
- Languages: Spanish; Portuguese (Brazilian feed only); English (SAP only)
- Picture format: 1080i HDTV (rescaled to 16:9 480i/576i for SDTV feed)

Ownership
- Owner: WarnerMedia Latin America
- Sister channels: Cartoon Network; Tooncast

History
- Launched: 1993; 33 years ago (block on Cartoon Network); 2 July 2001; 25 years ago
- Closed: 1 December 2021; 4 years ago
- Replaced by: Cartoonito

Links
- Website: Boomerang LA Archived official website at the Wayback Machine (archived 2021-05-15)

Boomerang was a 24-hour cable television channel owned by WarnerMedia under its International division. It was a localization of the original United States channel initially launched in 2001 and primarily carried classic Warner Bros. and Hanna-Barbera cartoons. In 2006 it was relaunched as a youth-oriented service. The network would relaunch once more in 2008, now focusing exclusively on teenagers, before becoming the first Boomerang feed in the world to undergo the 2014 worldwide rebrand on 28 September 2014.

The channel was replaced by Cartoonito on 1 December 2021 on 6 am across Latin America.

== History ==
=== Launching of Boomerang (2001–06) ===
Boomerang was launched on 2 July 2001 with the same graphics and programming from the US variant of the channel. It used to air classic Hanna-Barbera cartoons that had been dropped from the Latin American variant of Cartoon Network back then. The channel's main target audience mostly consisted of adults, who watched the shows in their childhoods; the content was previously seen on Cartoon Network but was lesser seen due to the channel's emphasis on original content.

The channel's launch was marked by a private event at the Atlanta compound with the participation of Hanna-Barbera veteran Iwao Takamoto. The channel launched as a single pan-regional feed, following the Buenos Aires time zone, and was arranged in three-hour content blocks.

=== As general children's service (2006–07) ===
On 3 April 2006, Boomerang was relaunched as a general children's entertainment network, introducing a logo and on-air branding style identical to that of Pogo (a Turner-owned kids channel in India). Classic cartoons were pushed to the overnight and early morning hours, while the daytime lineup began to feature live-action and animated series; this also encompassed a variation of the Tiny TV block, Mini TV.

The channel now targeted mainly kids and teens, with four theme blocks: a preschool block in the morning, a youth block in the afternoon, a movie block on weekends and a classic cartoon block overnight. Facing these changes, it signed an agreement with Argentine distributor Telefe Internacional in order to air the fifth season of Chiquititas and the kids' telenovela Rincón de Luz, both from Cris Morena. With the change, the channel was now aimed towards airing more third-party content.

=== As teen-oriented channel (2008–14) ===
In January 2008, (June 2008 in Latin America) in the Brazilian and Mexican localized feeds, the channel modified its logo and relaunched again, now solely broadcasting original and third-party-produced shows aimed at teenagers. All classical animation was moved over to Tooncast, a separate 24-hour channel that launched in December of that year. The channel aired some successful blocks, such as Boombox, which consisted of interviews with different artists and featuring live concerts in Latin America, the US, and later, the United Kingdom. On 1 April 2009, the channel launched a mobile service. Outside of Latin America, the channel is an associate member of the Caribbean Cable Cooperative. By mid-2010, the channel's logo was slightly modified. By May 2011, it was the only Boomerang channel in the world that was not airing any animated content.

=== Relaunch as kids and family channel (2014–21) ===
On 1 April 2014, cartoon programming returned to the daytime schedule. It was later confirmed that the channel would be part of the worldwide rebrand which took place later on 28 September that year.

=== Replacement by Cartoonito (2021) ===
In October 2021, it was announced on SKY Brasil’s lineup that Boomerang would be replaced by Cartoonito on 1 December. Shortly after that, the Argentine pay television service Telered announced the replacement for the rest of Latin America on the same date. And by 1 December 2021, Boomerang was replaced by Cartoonito throughout Latin America.

== Programming ==
From 2006 to 2008, Boomerang aired different blocks on the schedule for different audiences. The programming blocks included segments for young audiences, teenagers, and classic programming at night. The blocks were "color-coded" as the logo of the channel changed its color depending on which programming block was currently airing.

After October 2008, the channel decided to focus its programming on teenagers, dropping the preschool and classic programming of the channel. Since February 2009, the network only used the blue-green colored logo, as the other color-coded logos were eliminated.

- Boombox: A musical segment that aired since late 2007, which included music videos, live performances, and music documentaries for various artists It was removed in April 2014.
- Mini TV ("Tiny TV"): It consisted of preschool programming focused on children from 2 to 6 years old. It originally aired every morning. The logo turned yellow during this block. It was dropped in October 2008.
- Luces, Cámara, Boomerang/Luz, Câmera, Boomerang ("Lights, Camera, Boomerang"): This programming block was the only one to already exist on the former Boomerang and wasn't dropped from the channel. It aired different movies, most of them focused on teenagers. The logo kept its original colors. The block was removed by April 2014, and Cine Boomerang was broadcast instead as of October 2014.
- Regular programming: Boomerang aired regular programming focused on children and family. It aired mostly during the day. The logo turned red or sometimes translucent white. By 2008, up until the second quarter of 2014, the network's regular programming was focused on teenagers, with dramas from international territories.
- Live Action: Boomerang aired teen-focused programming, with series, reality shows and music videos. It was aired in late afternoon and early night. The logo turned blue and green.
- Película Boomerang/Filme Boomerang ("Boomerang Movie"): Movie sessions during the day only on weekdays. The logo turned totally blue.
- Matinee del Domingo/Matinê de Domingo ("Sunday Matinee"): A movie during the morning of every Sunday. The logo turned red with orange.
- Boomerang Clásico/Boomerang Clássico ("Classic Boomerang"): Classic programming aired every night and early morning until dawn. The logo turned totally green. It was dropped in January 2008 in the Mexican and Brazilian localised feeds (June in the pan-regional feed).
- Boomeraction: One of the first blocks to air on Boomerang, its programming focused on action-adventure shows including Thundarr the Barbarian, SWAT Kats: The Radical Squadron, The Pirates of Dark Water, Jonny Quest and Space Ghost. It was also one of the only Boomerang blocks to air across international feeds, including the United States, United Kingdom, and Australia versions of the network. The block was removed by April 3, 2006 due to the first rebrand, as all programming from the block left the schedule.
- CineBoom
- Cine Boomerang
- Boomerang Extra

== Logo history ==
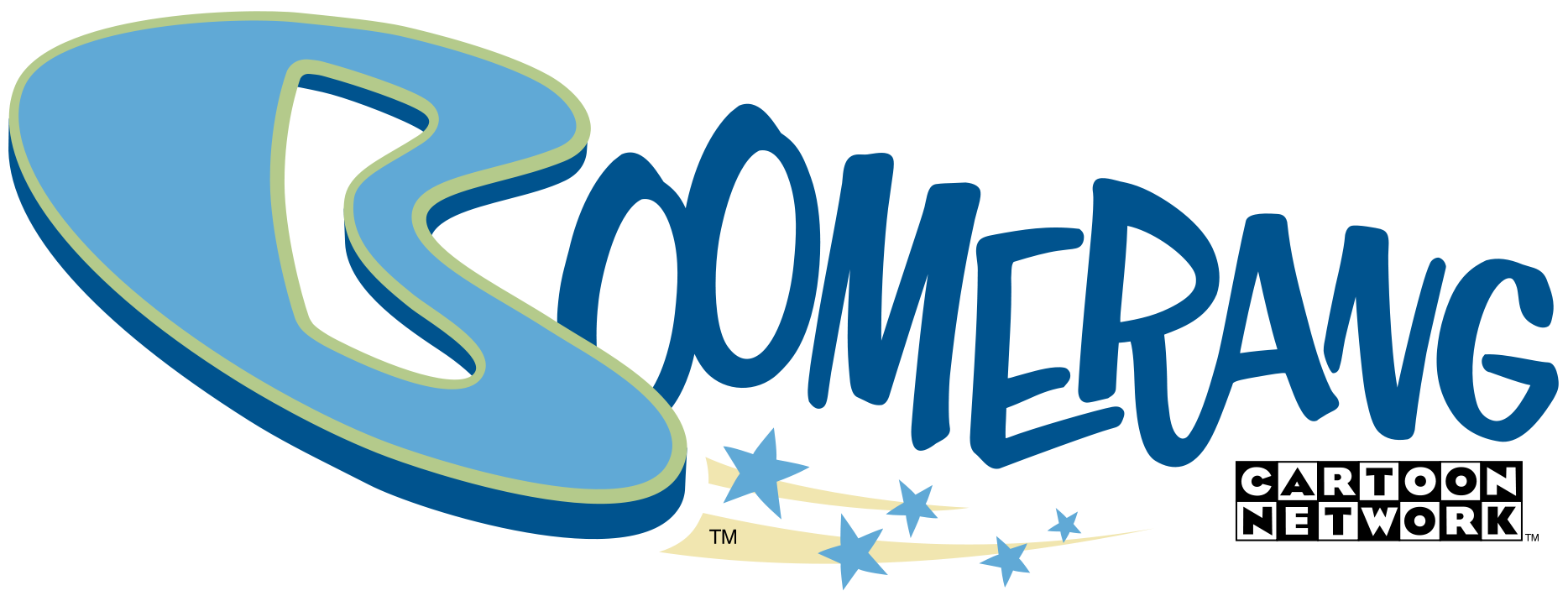
2 July 2001 – 3 April 2006

3 April 2006–January 2008

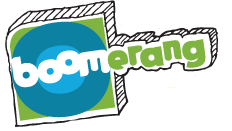
January 2008–4 October 2010

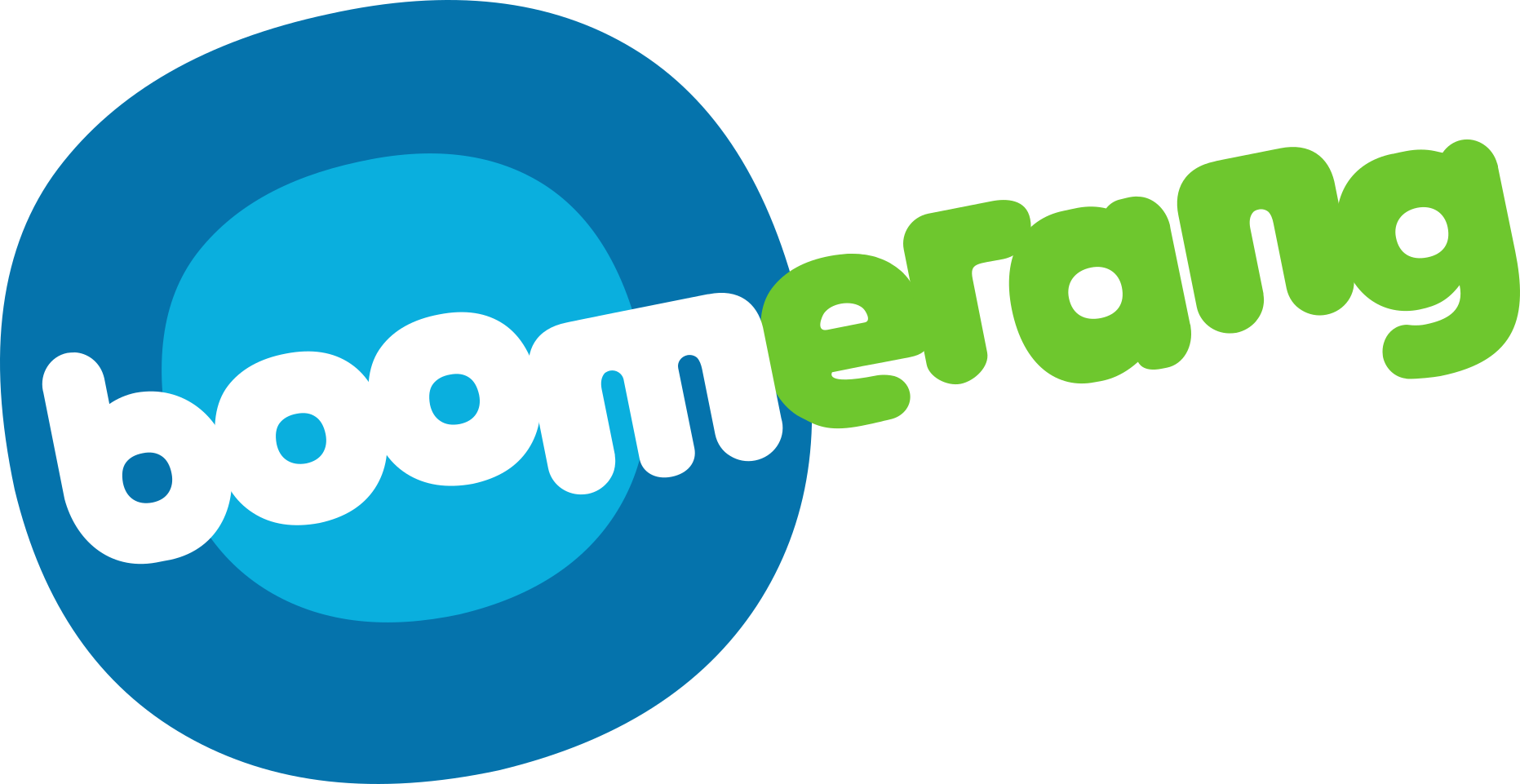
4 October 2010 – 28 September 2014

28 September 2014 – 1 December 2021

== See also ==
- Boomerang (TV network)
- Boomerang (British and Irish TV channel)
- Cartoon Network (Latin America)
- Cartoonito (brand)
- Cartoonito (Latin America)
- Tooncast
