= Discovery Civilization (Latin America) =

Pay television channel

- Broadcast area: Latin America

Programming
- Languages: Spanish; Portuguese
- Picture format: 1080i HDTV (downscaled to letterboxed 480i for the SDTV feed)

Ownership
- Owner: Warner Bros. Discovery Americas

History
- Launched: February 2005 (Latin America); 16 March 2005 (Brazil)
- Closed: 5 November 2019 (Brazil); 3 January 2022 (Latin America)
- Replaced by: HGTV
- Former names: Discovery Civilization Channel (2005-2010)

Links
- Website: Official website (in Portuguese)

Discovery Civilization was a Latin American pay television channel dedicated to civilization-themed programming, owned by Warner Bros. Discovery.
