= Discovery Kids (Latin America) =

Latin American children's TV channel

- The channel's current logo since 7 April 2021, depicting a green lowercase "k" with a yellow "D" enclosed on a blue sphere.
- Country: Latin America
- Broadcast area: Hispanic America; Brazil; The Caribbean
- Headquarters: Miami, Florida

Programming
- Languages: Spanish; Portuguese (Note: Brazilian feed only); English (Note: Via SAP)
- Picture format: 1080i HDTV (downscaled to 16:9 480i/576i for the channel's SDTV feeds)

Ownership
- Owner: Skydance Latin America and Caribbean
- Sister channels: Cartoonito; Tooncast; Cartoon Network

History
- Launched: 4 November 1996; 30 years ago
- Former names: Discovery Kids Channel (1996–1998)

Discovery Kids (stylized as DK or discovery k!ds) is a Latin American subscription television channel owned by Skydance Corporation and headquartered in Miami, Florida, which started as a programming block on the Latin American version of Discovery Channel. It was launched on 4 November 1996, with programming aimed for older children and preschoolers. It was owned by Discovery Networks Latin America and is one of two Discovery Kids-branded channels that remains airing (the other being Discovery Kids India). The programming is entirely in either Spanish or Portuguese, depending on the region.

The channel is divided into six live feeds: Pan-regional, Colombia, Southern (plus a Chilean subfeed), Mexico and Brazil, each with their own HD simulcast feeds. Until 2019, the channel had an HD version of the channel with different schedules broadcasting to all of Latin America. The network is also available in the Caribbean alongside several islands in the Americas, such as Barbados, Grenada, Jamaica and Puerto Rico.

== History ==
=== The Beginning era (1996–2002) ===
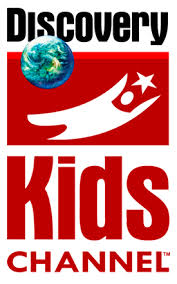
Logo used between 1996–1998.

On 4 November 1996, the channel launched and programming was aimed for older children and preschoolers. Preschool programming aired in the mornings, while shows for older children aired in the afternoons-evenings. The channel was originally named Discovery Kids Channel and the logo showed a white stick figure jumping on a red background. Its slogan was "¡Discovery Kids no es un canal infantil, es un canal para niños!". (Note: Literally Discovery Kids is not an infants channel, it's a kids channel!)

In the early-to-mid 1998, Discovery Kids Channel changed its name, dropping the word "Channel" to simply titled "Discovery Kids". The logo got updated, being a planet with a ring underneath it. Its alternate slogan "Baterías incluidas" (Note: Literally Batteries included) made its debut.

=== The Rainbow era (2002–2005) ===
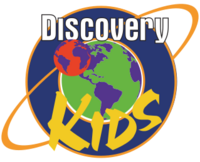
Logo used between 1998–2009, notable for being used in three eras.

In April 2002, the channel received a new look. Preschool programming began airing around the clock on weekdays, while shows for older children only aired around the clock on weekends. The channel's current slogan "¡Aquí, en Discovery Kids!" (Note: Literally Here, on Discovery Kids!) also made its debut.

In January 2003, the channel changed its programming to target preschoolers, removing all shows for older children, which furthermore, changed its demographic to children under 8 years of age.

In the early-to-mid 2000s, a website for the channel was launched, titled "Tu Discovery Kids". (Note: Literally Your Discovery Kids)

In February 2005, Doki, the channel's mascot, was introduced, originally appearing in promos. Several prototypes of the mascot were made on 28 October 2004. His name is an abbreviation of the term "A Dog for Kids".

=== The Imaginary era (2005–2009) ===
In March 2005, the channel itself rebranded, which furthermore, also turned Doki into a standalone mascot.

In 2006, the Doki Descubre (Note: Literally Doki Discovers) educational shorts began airing on the channel.

In April 2008, a new mascot was introduced, named Mundi. Originally made to celebrate Earth Day, it later became one of the standalone mascots for the channel.

In February 2009, additional mascots were also introduced, named Gabi and Fico. Originally made to celebrate sports-themed specials.

=== The Playground era (2009–2013) ===
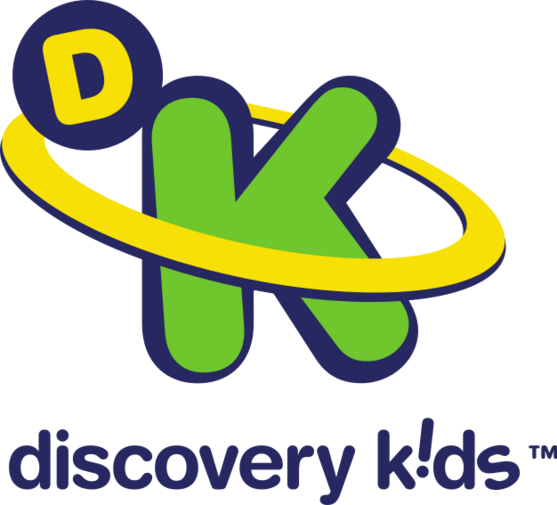
Logo used between 2009–2016, also notable for being used in two eras.

In March 2009, the channel received a new look. The logo now depicts a green "K" with a yellow "D" enclosed in a blue sphere, alongside a yellow ring around the "K". The channel also created specials based on several themes, such as ambience, reading, and friendship. The programming was also changed to focus on shows for children with up to 10 years of age. The remaining new mascots also made their first appearance: Anabella and Oto.

In December 2009, a pilot TV series based on its six mascots, titled Doki's Adventures, (Note: Spanish: Las Aventuras de Doki) premiered being produced by Nelvana.

In 2010, the final Doki Descubre short aired on the channel.

=== The World era (2013–2016) ===
In April 2013, a full-length TV series based on its six mascots, simply titled Doki, premiered being produced by Portfolio Entertainment, which grouped the mascots as "Team Doki". (Note: Spanish: Equipo Doki) The channel got rebranded as well, with the logo now being in 3D, rather than flat 2D. A high-definition feed also launched, with the D in the logo being replaced with the initials HD. The Discovery Kids logo was portrayed as a planet, full of colorful and bright buildings and houses, and the channel's mascots all lived in there.

In September 2014, the entire channel started airing entirely in 16:9. Back then, the channel mostly aired in 4:3, with some 16:9 programs airing since the rise of HD TVs.

In October 2015, Pac-Man and the Ghostly Adventures premiered on this channel, which was also the first program for older children to be premiered after January 2003. It was also the only TV show on the channel to be based on an arcade game.

=== The Modern era (2016–2021) ===
Logo used between 2016–2021.

On 1 April 2016, programming for older children returned after a 13-year hiatus for afternoons and evenings while preschool programming continued to air in the mornings. The logo was updated as well, replacing the "D" sphere with a speech bubble and removing the ring around the lowercase "k". Doki characters were also removed from the bumpers and as the channel's mascots, though its TV series was still aired until 18 June 2019.

On 2 January 2017, Angry Birds Toons premiered, making it the only TV show on the channel to be based on a mobile game.

=== The Current era (2021–present) ===
On 7 April 2021, the channel received a new logo, designed by Spanish design agency Dtmg.tv Studio, with the "D" speech bubble being changed back to a sphere, while retaining the lowercase "k". Children also appeared in promos.

== Website ==
Discovery Kids had a website that launched in the early-to-mid 2000s, with the app launching in the early-to-mid 2010s. A Brazilian version was also made, with all of its content being translated into Portuguese.

One common feature of the site are its online games, which originally required the Flash Player plugin. The site offers games and formerly interactive books, and activities. At launch, the website was titled Tu Discovery Kids, (Note: Literally Your Discovery Kids) with the app being simply titled Discovery Kids at launch.

In June 2005, the website received a major update. New games based on the channel's mascot were made, such as Saltando con Doki. (Note: Literally Jumping with Doki) (Note: Known in Brazil as Pulando com Doki)

In 2008, the website received another major update. A video player was added to its home page, alongside a Flash-based interface and the addition of minigames. Accounts were also implemented.

In 2011, the website received yet another major update, now featuring a 3D logo casting shadows in the banner. During this era, the app launched.

Between February 2012 and 2018, a webpage appeared on the website, title Kids en Control. (Note: Literally Kids in Control) Kids en Control allows children to vote for shows, similar to Cartoon Network's 'Votatoon' which was exclusive to Latin America. The show that have the most votes would air via marathons on Saturdays.

In April 2013, the website received a minor update. The background has been changed to the one from the new look at the time. The background has three variants depending on the hour set in the user's computer: day, noon, and night.

In July 2015, the website and app got rebranded as Discovery Kids Play, featuring the addition of protected content that could only be accessed via an account, as well as HTML5-based games. Web browsers with Flash Player support are still able to play the old site's Flash games. The tudiscoverykids.com domain remained in use until late 2016, when it was changed to discoverykidsplay.com, originally used as a redirect following the launch of Discovery Kids Play.

In December 2019, the website and app was renamed to Discovery Kids Plus, with a new design. The new website is also geo-blocked, being exclusive to Latin America. All of the Flash games from the old sites were also removed due to Adobe Flash Player's end-of-life. The Brazilian website was also updated to redirect to the Spanish website once accessed outside of Brazil.

Following the merger between WarnerMedia and Discovery Inc., on 12 December 2022, the site rebranded to simply Discovery Kids and removed all of its videos and episodes.

== Audience composition ==
According to TGI Latina in 2003, most of the audience who received the channel were female, which represents a total of 56%, with the male audience at 44%. Adult female aged between 25 and 49 years were also involved, as they are commonly the parents of children who guide at watching the channel, representing a total of 49%.

== Feeds ==
The channel currently broadcasts 3 feeds, each having their own HD simulcast feed:

- Pan-regional feed: broadcasting to most Latin American countries, including the Caribbean. It uses the Colombian (UTC-5) and Argentine (UTC-3) time zones.
- Mexico feed: broadcasting exclusively to that country, with different schedule and TV series. It uses the Mexico City time zone (UTC-6/-5 DST).
- Brazil feed: broadcasting exclusively to that country, with different schedule and TV series. Broadcasting in Portuguese, it uses the Brasilia time zone (UTC-3).
- Colombia feed: broadcasting exclusively to that country, with different schedule. It uses the Bogotá time zone (UTC-5). Merged with the Pan-regional feed on 5 June 2023.
- Southern feed: broadcasting to Argentina, Paraguay and Uruguay, with different schedule. It used the Buenos Aires time zone (UTC-3). Merged with the Pan-regional feed on 18 August 2025.
- Chilean feed: broadcasting exclusively to that country, with different schedule. It used the Santiago time zone (UTC-4/UTC-3 DST). Closed on 1 July 2025.

== Live events ==
- La Ronda de Discovery Kids: (Note: Originally "Ciranda Discovery Kids" in Brazil.) The channel organized live events, named La Ronda de Discovery Kids, (Note: Literally The Discovery Kids Tour) where Doki, the channel's mascot, along with characters from the series visited some cities and made performances, originally made to celebrate the channel's 10th anniversary in 2006. The last event with that name was in 2008. The channel still organizes events on Latin American cities from time to time. In 2009, a similar project, named Exploración, (Note: Literally Exploration) which dealt with the environment, was made. In 2010, a similar event, named ¡En sus marcas, listos, ya!, (Note: Literally In your marks, get set, go!) was made in Mexico. From July to September 2012, a new event named Expreso Discovery Kids (Note: Literally Discovery Kids Express) was made on cities of Mexico and Venezuela.

== See also ==
- Cartoon Network (Latin American TV channel)
- Cartoonito (Latin American TV channel)
- Discovery Familia
- Discovery Kids (Australia)
- Discovery Kids (Canada)
- Discovery Kids (UK)
- Discovery Kids (India)
