= Cartoonito (Latin America) =

- Country: United States; Mexico; Brazil
- Broadcast area: Latin America and the Caribbean
- Headquarters: Atlanta, United States; Mexico City, Mexico; Buenos Aires, Argentina; Bogotá, Colombia; Santiago, Chile; São Paulo, Brazil

Programming
- Languages: Spanish; Portuguese; English (available in SAP only)
- Picture format: 1080i HDTV (rescaled to 16:9 480i/576i for SDTV feed)

Ownership
- Owner: Skydance Latin America and Caribbean
- Sister channels: Cartoon Network; Tooncast; Discovery Kids; Adult Swim

History
- Launched: 1 April 2014; 12 years ago (as Boomerang); 1 December 2021; 4 years ago (as Cartoonito)
- Replaced: Boomerang

Cartoonito is a 24-hour cable television channel owned by Skydance Corporation under its International division. Launched on 1 December 2021, it is a localization of the namesake preschool brand for Latin American audiences and airs programs aimed at children aged 2–6.

== History ==
=== As Boomerang (2014–21) ===
On 1 April 2014, Boomerang’s cartoon programming relaunched to the daytime schedule. It was later confirmed that the channel would be part of the worldwide rebrand which took place later on 28 September that year.

=== Rebranding as Cartoonito (2021–present) ===
In October 2021, it was announced on SKY Brasil's lineup that Boomerang would be replaced by Cartoonito on 1 December. Shortly after that, the Argentine pay television service Telered announced the replacement for the rest of Latin America on the same date. Boomerang was replaced by Cartoonito throughout Latin America on 1 December 2021, becoming the first Cartoonito feed in the world to undergo the Global re-introduction.

== See also ==
- The Cartoon Network, Inc.
