= Glitz (TV channel) =

Latin American pay television channel

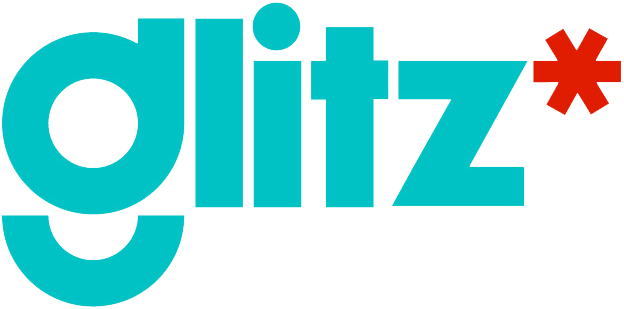
- Country: Latin America
- Headquarters: Buenos Aires, Santiago

Programming
- Language: Spanish
- Picture format: 480i/576i SDTV

Ownership
- Owner: Warner Bros. Discovery Americas
- Sister channels: HTV; MuchMusic; I.Sat

History
- Launched: May 1, 2011; 15 years ago
- Replaced: FashionTV
- Closed: May 5, 2016; 10 years ago (Brazil); February 29, 2024; 2 years ago (Latin America)
- Replaced by: TNT Series (Brazil)

Glitz (stylized as "glitz*") was a Latin American pay television channel that was launched on May 1, 2011, replacing Fashion TV, after the license agreement between the French channel and then-Glitz* parent Warner Bros. Discovery Americas, who purchased the channel from Claxson in 2007, ended in 2011; it continued to target women. The network departed Brazil on May 5, 2016.

In December 2023, Warner Bros. Discovery announced that Glitz would wind down in the remainder of Latin America, closing on February 29, 2024 along with I.Sat and the Latin American version of MuchMusic.
