= TNT Series =

Latin American television channel

- Country: Latin America and the Caribbean
- Broadcast area: Latin America, including Brazil
- Headquarters: Atlanta, USA; Buenos Aires, Argentina; Mexico City, Mexico

Programming
- Languages: Spanish; Portuguese (Brazil only); English (available as a second audio track with translated continuity)
- Picture format: 1080i HDTV (downscaled to 16:9 480i/576i for the SDTV feed)

Ownership
- Owner: Skydance Latin America and Carriban
- Sister channels: TNT; TNT Novelas; Space; Warner Channel; TCM; TNT Sports (Argentina); TNT Sports (Chile); TNT Sports (Brazil)

History
- Launched: 10 March 2015 (Argentina); 17 March 2015 (Latin America); 24 April 2015 (Brazil)
- Replaced: Infinito (Latin America); Glitz (Brazil)

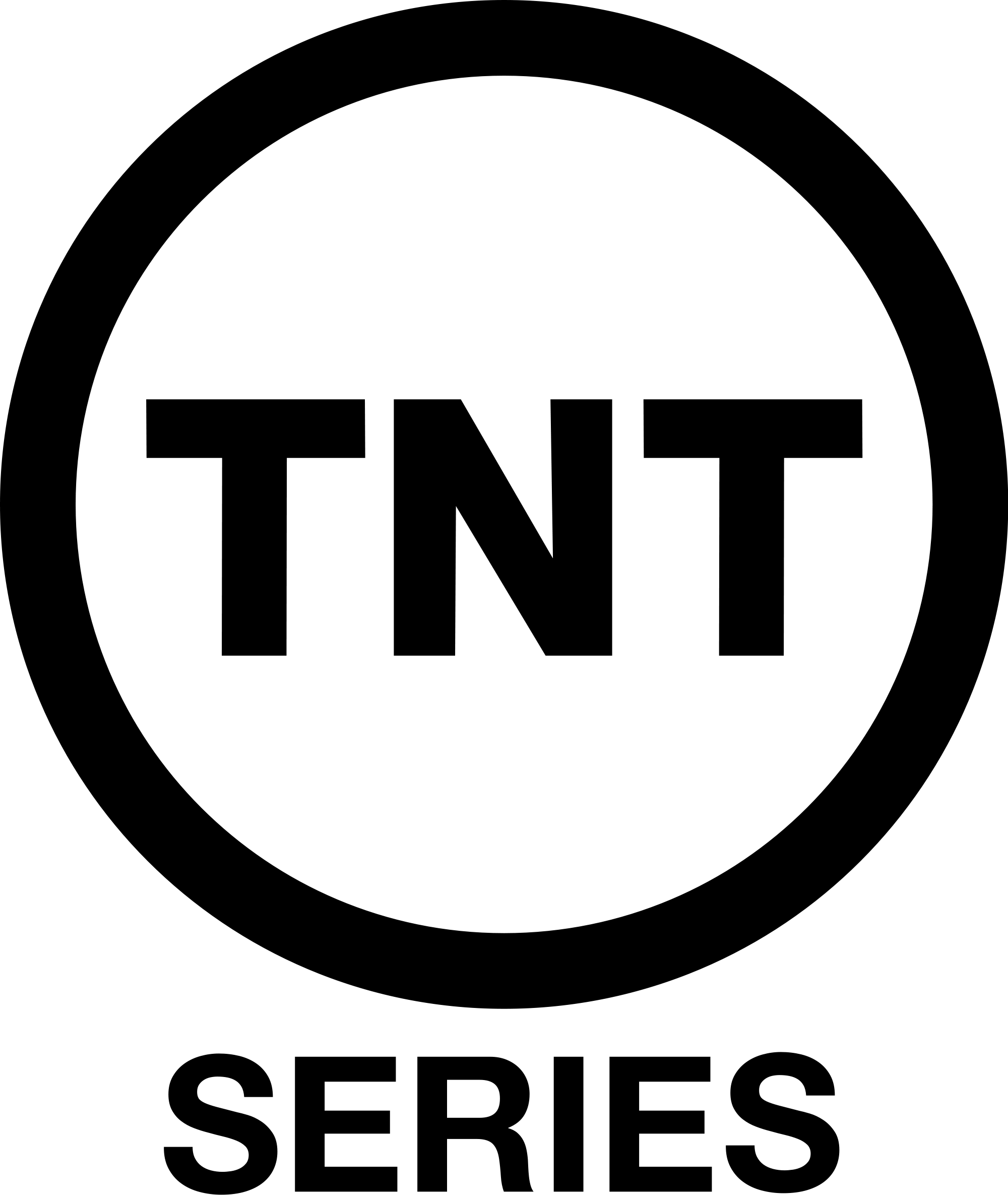
TNT Series logo used from 2015 until November 30, 2016.

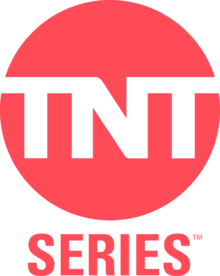
TNT Series logo used from November 30, 2016, until September 17, 2025.

TNT Series (TNT Séries, with an accent, in Brazil) is a Latin American pay television channel which is focused on airing television series of action, suspense, drama, police and science fiction. It is operated by Skydance Corporation. Launched as a spin-off of Latin American subscription network TNT, it premiered in Argentina on 10 March 2015 replacing Infinito, whose programming was moved to truTV, whilst it was launched on the rest of Latin American countries on 17 March 2015.

The channel's first show to be broadcast was Hollywood: One on One.

In Brazil, it was launched separately on 24 April 2015, replacing Glitz.

== Feeds ==
- TNT Series Mexico
- TNT Series Pan-regional (Colombia, Chile, Panama, Peru, Ecuador, Bolivia, Venezuela, Central America and the Caribbean)
- TNT Series South (Argentina/Paraguay/Uruguay)
- TNT Series Brazil
