= TNT Novelas =

Latin American television channel

- Broadcast area: Latin America; Not available in Venezuela, Puerto Rico or the Caribbean Region (except Dominican Republic)
- Headquarters: Buenos Aires, Argentina

Programming
- Picture format: 1080i HDTV (downscaled to 16:9 480i/576i for the SDTV feed)

Ownership
- Owner: Skydance Latin America and Carriban
- Sister channels: TNT; TNT Series; Space; TCM; Warner Channel

History
- Launched: 1 October 2011 (Latin America) & (Brazil)
- Former names: TBS Veryfunny (Latin America, 2011–16); TBS Muitodivertido (Brazil, 2011–16); TBS (2016–23)

TNT Novelas is a Latin American pay television channel distributed by Skydance Latin America and Carriban. The channel, formerly a regional version of TBS, used to air comedy films and series, and nowadays, its schedule consists of soap operas, mostly, between productions from Spain, Turkey and some from Latin America. On May 7, 2023, it was announced that TBS (formerly branded as TBS veryfunny in Latin America and TBS muitodivertido in Brasil) would be replaced in Latin America by TNT Novelas. TNT Novelas launched on June 26, 2023.

== Programming ==
=== Current programming ===
- ¿Será que es amor?
- Doctor Milagro
- Traicionada
- Amor Eterno
- Mi hogar, mi destino
- Te la dedico
- Fuerza de Mujer
- Yargi secretos de familia
- La Agencia
- Nehir - Presa del amor
- Olvídame si puedes
- La Promesa
- Sueños de Libertad

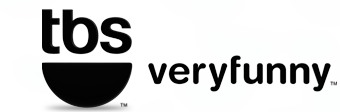
Spanish logo used from October 1, 2011 until March 31, 2016.

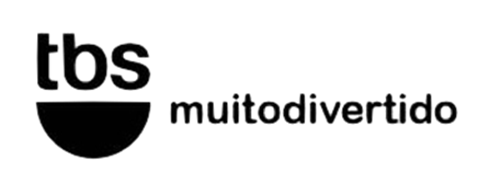
Portuguese logo used from October 1, 2011 until March 31, 2016.

Final TBS logo used from March 31, 2016 until June 26, 2023.

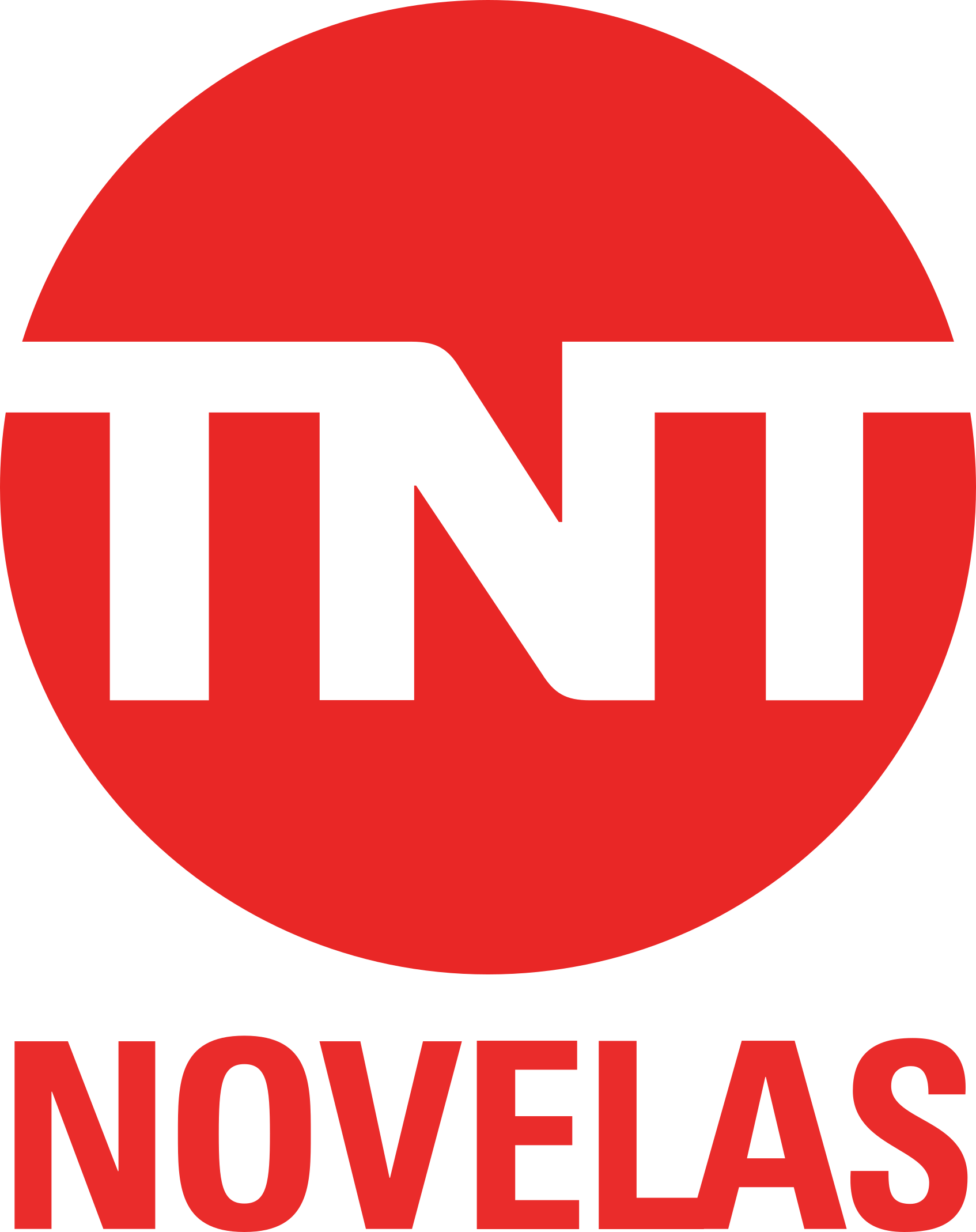
TNT Novelas logo used since June 26, 2023 until September 15, 2025.

=== Former programming ===
- 30 Rock
- America’s Funniest Videos
- Anger Management
- Angie Tribeca
- Are We There Yet?
- Becker
- Bent
- Brooklyn Nine-Nine
- CQC: Custe o Que Custar (seen only in Brazil)
- Cupido (original production)
- The Detour
- El Chapulín Colorado
- El Chavo
- Elmiro Miranda Show (original production, seen only in Brazil)
- É Tudo Improviso (seen only in Brazil)
- Everybody Hates Chris
- Everybody Loves Raymond
- Falling Skies
- Glenn Martin, DDS
- Hot in Cleveland
- I'm Sorry
- Impractical Jokers
- The King of Queens
- The Last O.G.
- Lost
- Married... with Children
- The Millers
- The Mindy Project
- My Name Is Earl
- The Nanny
- The New Adventures of Old Christine
- The Office (UK)
- The Office (US)
- Os Anjos do Sexo (seen only in Brazil)
- Outsourced
- Peter Capusotto y sus videos (seen only in Argentina, Paraguay and Uruguay)
- Psiconautas (original production)
- Search Party
- Sex and the City
- South Beach Tow
- Storage Hunters
- Those Who Can't
- Total Drama Island
- truTV Presents: World's Dumbest...
- Web Therapy
- Wings
- Wedding Band
- Wrecked

==== Adult Swim block ====
- 12 oz. Mouse
- Aqua Teen Hunger Force
- The Brak Show
- Harvey Birdman, Attorney at Law
- Hot Streets
- Mr. Pickles
- Rick and Morty
- Robot Chicken
- Sealab 2021
- Space Ghost Coast to Coast
- Squidbillies
- Stroker & Hoop
