= Space (Latin American TV channel) =

- Country: Latin America
- Broadcast area: Latin America
- Headquarters: Buenos Aires, Argentina

Programming
- Languages: Spanish and Portuguese
- Picture format: 1080i HDTV (downscaled to 16:9 480I/576i for the SDTV feed)

Ownership
- Owner: Skydance Latin America and Carriban
- Sister channels: TNT; TNT Series; TNT Novelas; Warner Channel; TCM

History
- Launched: 11 March 1991

Space is a Latin American pay television channel owned by Skydance Corporation. It airs movies, TV series and boxing events. It was launched on 11 March 1991 and it is headquartered in Buenos Aires, Argentina. This television network is aimed at a male audience.

== History ==
Space was launched on 11 March 1991 as the first Latin American 24-hour movie channel. It was owned and operated by Imagen Satelital, a company owned by Argentine businessman Alberto González. In its first years, it was an entertainment network heavily centred towards films and sporting (mostly combat sports (including boxing)) events.

In 1997, Imagen Satelital was bought by Claxson Interactive Group, itself owned by Venezuelan conglomerate Grupo Cisneros. In 2002, after a graphical rebrand, Space includes artistic shows in its programming schedule.

In October 2007, Claxson Interactive Group was purchased by Turner Broadcasting System Latin America; its channels (including Space) started to be managed by the regional branch of Time Warner.

On 8 April 2008, Turner modifies Space's programming in order to avoid inside competition with TNT, and centres its programming towards action, adventure and suspense films.

In 2008, Space launches its own HD feed, and two years later, in 2011, it launches a second audio track in English to its video feeds.

== Feeds ==
- Space Mexico
- Space Pan-regional (Colombia, Peru, Ecuador, Bolivia, Central America and the Caribbean)
- Space Alternate (Chile and Venezuela)
- Space South (Argentina/Paraguay/Uruguay)
- Space Brazil

== See also ==
- TNT (TV network)
