= Tooncast =

Latin American pay television channel

- Broadcast area: Latin America
- Headquarters: Buenos Aires, Argentina

Programming
- Languages: Spanish; Portuguese (Brazil only); English (Via SAP)
- Picture format: 16:9 1080i HDTV; 4:3 480i SDTV

Ownership
- Owner: Skydance Latin America and Caribbean
- Parent: The Cartoon Network, Inc.
- Sister channels: Cartoon Network; Cartoonito; Discovery Kids; Adult Swim

History
- Launched: December 1, 2008; 17 years ago

Tooncast is a Latin American pay television channel owned by Skydance Corporation through its International division. It was launched on December 1, 2008; its programming consists of classical animation, both from Hanna-Barbera, Warner Bros. Animation and Cartoon Network. The channel is a commercial-free service.

== History ==
The channel was launched on December 1, 2008, after all classic animation programming from Warner Bros., Hanna-Barbera and MGM were removed from Boomerang Latin America, to center the network towards the teen audience, and replacing it with live-action programming instead.

Tooncast follows the Boomerang US old channel line-up, which aired classic cartoons. Old Cartoon Network commercials are also broadcast on the channel, such as "Cartoons That Never Made It", Cartoon Network Groovies and Boomerang Shorties. Unlike other channels of Turner Broadcasting System Latin America, few pay-TV providers carry Tooncast. The only exception is Brazil, where the channel is available on most subscription TV providers, such as Oi TV, Claro TV, GVT TV, Vivo TV, Kiwisat and Nossa TV. Since August 1, 2014, Tooncast began to be carried on NET, the biggest cable television company in Brazil.

Even though Tooncast remained with a single pan-regional feed with audio tracks in Spanish, Brazilian Portuguese and English, in November 2012 the channel started using the Brazilian content rating system.

On September 26, 2018, the channel was picked up by Sky Brasil.

On April 1, 2019, all classic programming from the Turner animation library, including productions from Warner Bros., Hanna-Barbera and MGM, were removed from the schedule making focus on Cartoon Network original productions, and also airing anime series like Pokémon and the Brazilian animated series Monica and Friends, following WarnerMedia's business restructure, that also affected programming on sister networks like Cartoon Network and Boomerang. However, it eventually returned from June 1–July 1, 2019 and they have recently been reinstated. The cartoons of Hanna-Barbera, Warner Bros. and MGM returned to the programming in June, however, they left the schedule again in July of the same year, and then returned in January 2020, where shows like Batman Beyond, Teen Titans and ThunderCats were included in the schedule for the first time.

On June 1, 2021, the channel's programming underwent a drastic change, being greatly reduced compared to previous months; However, this reduction in programs is also accompanied by some new releases. It is speculated that these changes were caused by the launch in Latin America of the streaming service HBO Max.

On December 1, 2022, the channel removed all Hanna-Barbera, Warner Bros., and DC shows, leaving only original Cartoon Network shows, bringing back some shows that were removed, but making the channel's programming even smaller.

On June 1, 2023, Tooncast's programming changed yet again, this time bringing back retired shows, including Warner Bros. and Hanna-Barbera classics.

On November 28, 2023, customers of the operator Sky Brasil received notice that TCM and Tooncast would be removed from the operator on December 31 (but only leave on January 31, 2024). The operator later confirmed that the channels would leave other operators throughout 2024, but the information was later denied by WBD itself.

After that, it was revealed that both channels will receive HD signals, now under the management of Warner Bros. Discovery.

== See also ==
- Boomerang - the network's American counterpart equivalent
- Cartoon Network - the network's spin-off
- Cartoon Network (Latin America) - current similar sister channel
