= Warner TV =

International TV channel showing American films and shows

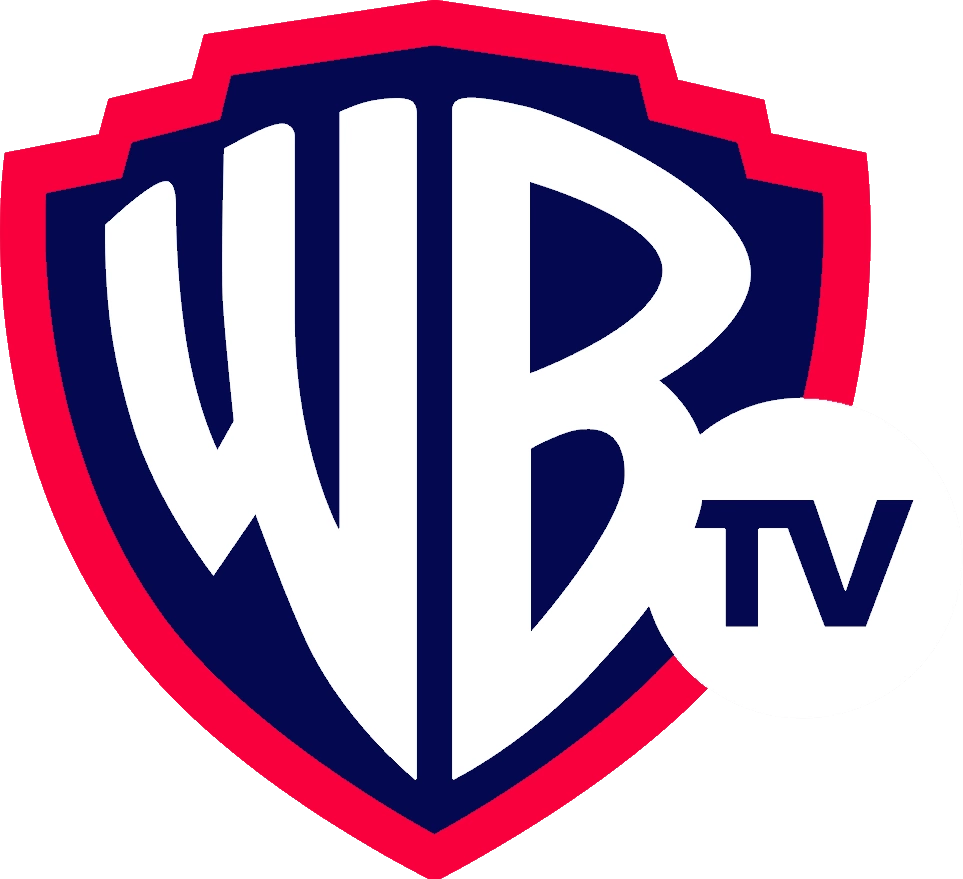
- Logo used in Latin America (since 2026) and Asia, respectively

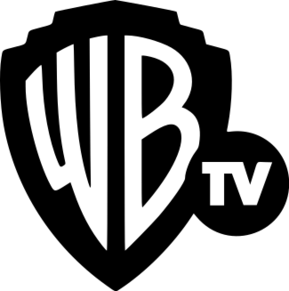
- Logo used in Europe, also used in the WB TV Next logo.
- Broadcast area: Latin America; Brazil; Mexico; Colombia; Argentina; Africa; Sub-Saharan Africa; Southeast Asia; Singapore; Malaysia; Philippines; Indonesia; Thailand; Vietnam; East Asia; Hong Kong; Taiwan; Japan; South Korea; South Asia; Sri Lanka; Bangladesh; Maldives; Europe; France; Belgium; Switzerland; Germany; Poland; Romania; Spain; Czech Republic

Programming
- Languages: English; Spanish; Portuguese; French; Chinese; Indonesian; Malaysian; Thai; Vietnamese; Cantonese; Japanese; Korean; German; Polish; Romanian; Italian (formerly); Czech
- Picture format: 1080i HDTV

Ownership
- Owner: Warner Bros. Discovery (2022–2026); Skydance Corporation (2026–present)

History
- Launched: September 30, 1995; 31 years ago (Latin America); January 1, 2010; 16 years ago (Asia); November 9, 2017; 8 years ago (France); September 25, 2021; 5 years ago (Germany); October 23, 2021; 5 years ago (Poland and Romania); October 30, 2022; 4 years ago (Italy); April 14, 2023; 3 years ago (Spain); April 2, 2024; 2 years ago (Czech Republic)
- Replaced: TNT (Europe)
- Closed: October 5, 2025; 12 months ago (Italy)
- Replaced by: Discovery Channel (Italy)
- Former names: WBTV: El Canal Warner / O Canal da Warner (1995–1999); The Warner Channel (1999–2000, 1995–2000 on the channel logo)

Links
- Website: Official Website (Asia); Official Website (France); Official Website (Germany); Official Website (Poland); Official Website (Romania); Official Website (Italy); Official Website (Spain); Official Website (Czech)

Warner TV, also known as Warner Channel, is a pay television channel mainly airing in Latin America, Europe, parts of South Asia and Southeast Asia, which is owned by Skydance Corporation through its International unit that focuses on airing American series and films.

Most programming air in their original English audio, with subtitles in Spanish (for Latin American countries except Brazil), Portuguese (for Brazil), Chinese (for Taiwan, Hong Kong, and Singapore), Malaysian (for Malaysia) and Indonesian (for Indonesia), however, there are also some dubbed programming.

Warner TV's headquarters are located in Brazil, Colombia, Chile, Singapore, and Malaysia; the broadcasting, however, is based in Miami for Latin American viewers and Singapore for Asian viewers.

The channel's catalogue, for its entirety, is sourced from the library of Warner Bros. Entertainment, which licensed its name to the channel until 2019.

From 2021 to 2023, Warner TV replaced all existing versions of TNT in Europe.

== History ==
In March 2015, the Filipino feed separated from the Southeast Asian Warner TV channel to air a different programming schedule, including selected programming from truTV.

On November 1, 2015, the Latin American channel started airing dubs of its programming instead of just showing subtitles. This caused an uproar to most of its audience.

On November 9, 2017, Turner Broadcasting System France and Canal+ both launched Warner TV in France, replacing Syfy which became a SFR exclusive.

On April 22, 2020, the French version launched in Sub-Saharan Africa in StarTimes.

On May 2, 2020, Warner TV began broadcasting the Adult Swim programming block in Latin America and Brazil, which initially included Rick and Morty, Robot Chicken, and Aqua Teen Hunger Force. On May 3, 2021, Metalocalypse and The Shivering Truth were added to the Adult Swim programming block. On November 8, 2021, Adult Swim was pulled from Warner TV's lineup.

On June 14, 2021, it was announced that the TNT channels in Germany would be rebranded into Warner TV from September 25, 2021.

On July 8, 2021, it was announced that TNT in Poland and Romania would rebrand into Warner TV from October 23, 2021.

In October 2022, it was announced that a Warner TV channel would be launched in Italy by October 30 of the same year. However unlike other Warner TV channels, this one operated as a free to air channel on Italian DTT. The channel however shut down on October 5, 2025, in order to be replaced with a free to air version of the Italian Discovery Channel.

In January 2023, the French version, which was only accessible through Canal+, was removed alongside other French versions of Warner Bros. Discovery's channels in France. However, the channel was still accessible in other French-speaking countries where Warner Bros. has distribution contract with other companies. In March 2023, the channel returned in France following the launch of the Le Pass Warner ("The Warner Pass"), a subscription-based channel available on Amazon Prime Video. The Pass Warner was replaced by HBO Max at its launch in France in June 2024 with its subscribers automatically transferred to a HBO Max subscription. It was also made accessible to Free, SFR, and Orange offers.

On February 27, 2023, it was announced that TNT in Spain would be rebranded as Warner TV on April 14, 2023.

In January 2024, it was announced that Warner TV would be launched in the Czech Republic sometime in the same year, and on March 4, Warner Bros. Discovery has confirmed that the channel would launch on April 2, and like its Italian counterpart, it would be a free to air channel.

older logo
