= List of programs broadcast by TruTV =

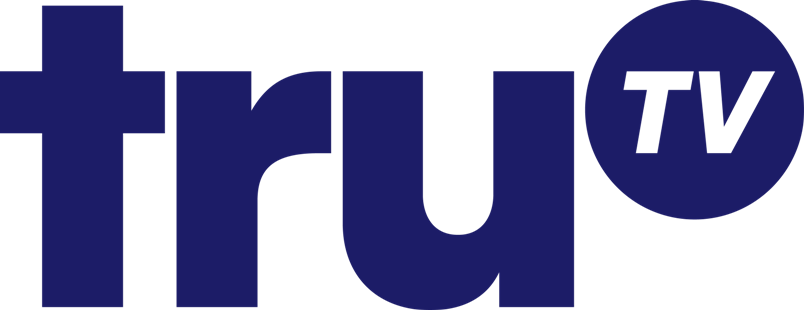
Current TruTV logo, used since October 27, 2014

This is a list of television programs currently and formerly broadcast by truTV, a cable and satellite television network owned by the Warner Bros. Discovery Networks division of Warner Bros. Discovery. This list also covers programs aired during the network's years as Court TV from its original launch in 1991 until its 2008 re-branding as truTV.

== Current programming ==
=== Original programming ===
A list of shows currently in production, as of April 2024.

=== Talk/Debate ===
Title	Premiere date
#Handles	March 2024
The Steam Room with EJ and Chuck	March 2024

=== Sports ===
Title	Premiere date
NCAA March Madness (with TBS, TNT, and CBS)	March 15, 2011
Banana Ball	August 16, 2024
NHL on TNT (overflow coverage, simulcasts, and alternate broadcasts)	January 26, 2022
MotoGP	March 9, 2024
TNT Sports Tonight (overflow coverage)	March 2024
NHL on TNT Postgame (simulcasts)	March 2024
Inside March Madness	March 2024
NCAA Tip-Off	March 2024
Comeback: A March Madness Story	March 2024
NCAA Tournament Encore	March 2024
NHL on TNT Opening Face Off (overflow coverage)	March 2024
Bellator Champions Series 1: Belfast	March 2024
Born Racers	July 2024
Poker on Tru	July 2024
College Football on TNT Sports (overflow coverage, simulcasts, and alternate broadcasts)	August 2024
NASCAR Inside the Playoffs	September 2024
Tennis on TNT (overflow coverage, simulcasts, and alternate broadcasts)	May 2025
NASCAR on TNT Sports (overflow coverage, simulcasts, and alternate broadcasts)	June 2025
FIA World Endurance Championship	April 2026

=== Programming from sister networks ===
Programming from truTV's sister networks.

Title	Premiere date
AEW Dynamite (from TBS and TNT)	January 2025
American Dad! (from TBS)	June 2023
Crimes Gone Viral (from Investigation Discovery)	September 2023
House of Highlights: Broadcast Boys	March 2024
Inside the NBA Rewind (from TNT)	March 2024
The Inside Story (from TNT)	March 2024
TNT Sports: The Line (from TNT)	March 2024
Ballers (from HBO)	August 2025

=== Acquired programming ===
Title	Premiere date
Home Court (from CBS)	March 2024
Up & Adams (from FanDuel TV)	2024

== Former programming ==
Some of the shows on this list (indicated in bold) are currently airing in reruns on truTV.

=== Original programming ===
Title	Year(s) aired
10 Things	2016
101 Places to Party Before You Die	2022
Adam Ruins Everything	2015–19
All Worked Up	2009–11
Anatomy of Crime	2000–02
Almost Genius	2015–16
At Home with Amy Sedaris	2017–20
Backyard Bar Wars	2021
Bait Car	2007–12
Barmageddon	2014–15
Black Gold	2008–13
Bear Swamp Recovery	2011
Big Brian The Fortune Seller	2011
Big Trick Energy	2021
Billy on the Street	2015–17; transferred from Fuse
Bobcat Goldthwait's Misfits & Monsters	2018
Branson Famous	2014–15
Breaking Greenville	2015
Cash Dome	2013
The Carbonaro Effect	2014–20
Caught Red Handed	2012–13
Chris Webber's Full Court Pranks	2017
Clipaholics	2012
Comedy Knockout	2016–18
Conspiracy Theory with Jesse Ventura	2009–12
Container Wars	2013
Crisis Point	2008–??
Disorder in the Court	2006–14
Dominick Dunne's Power, Privilege, and Justice	2002–09
Double Cross with Blake Griffin	2021
Fake Off	October 27, 2014–17
Fast Foodies	February 4, 2021–April 21, 2022
Forensic Files	2000–11
Fameless	2015–17
Friends of the People	2014–15
Full Throttle Saloon	2009–14
Greatest Ever	July 6, 2016–17
Guinness World Records Gone Wild/Unleashed	2013–14
Hack My Life	2015–18
Hair-Jacked	2014–14
Hardcore Pawn	2010–15
Haunting Evidence	2005–08
Hot Ones: The Game Show	2020
Hot Pursuit	2006–09
How To Be A Grownup	2014–15
The Hustlers	2015
I, Detective	2001–06
I'm Sorry	2017–19
**Impractical Jokers**	2011–24, transferred to TBS
It's Personal with Amy Hoggart	2020
Inside American Jail	2005–10
Jon Glaser Loves Gear	2016–19
The Investigators	2004–08
It Only Hurts When I Laugh!	2009–11
Kart Life	2015
Kentucky Bidders	2013
Killer Karaoke	2012–14
Laff Mobb's Laff Tracks	2018–20
Las Vegas Jailhouse	2010–12
Lizard Lick Towing	2011–14
Ma's Roadhouse	2010
Man vs. Cartoon	2009
Masterminds	2003–11
Most Daring	2007–10
Most Shocking	2006–10
Motor City Masters	2014
NFL Full Contact	2010
North Mission Road	2003–07
Ocean Force	2007–09
Operation Repo	2008–14
Over the Limit	2010
Paid Off with Michael Torpey	2018–19
Panic Button	2013
Party Heat	2007–10
Police POV	2011–12
The Principal's Office	2008–09
Psychic Detectives	2004–08
Rachel Dratch's Late Night Snack	2016-18
Rehab: Party at the Hard Rock Hotel	2008–10
Road Spill	2015
The Safecrackers	2014
Santas in the Barn	2015
Six Degrees of Everything	2015
Snap Judgment	1999–2000
South Beach Tow	2011–14
Southern Fried Stings	2010–11
Speeders Fight Back	2008–09
Speeders	2007–09
Storage Hunters	2011–13
Star Jones	2007–08
Street Patrol	2008–09
The Wrong Man?	2007
Suburban Secrets	2007–08
Super Into	2015
Tacoma FD	2019–23
Talk Show the Game Show	2017–18
The Chris Gethard Show	2017-18 (transferred from Fusion)
Those Who Can't	2016–19
Tiger Team	2007
'Til Death Do Us Part	2007
Tirdy Works	2020
Top 20 Most Shocking	2009–12
Top Secret Videos	2020-21
truInside	2016
**truTV Presents: World's Dumbest...**	2008–14
TruTV's Top Funniest	2013–15
Upload with Shaquille O'Neal	2013–14
Upscale With Prentice Penny	2017
Vegas Strip	2011–12
Video Justice	2006–07
Way Out West	2014–15
World's Wildest Vacation Videos	2008–09
You Can Do Better	2016–17

=== Acquired programming ===
Title	Year(s) aired
America's Funniest Home Videos	2015–16
America's Most Wanted: Final Justice	2000–03
The Client	2000
Cops	1999–2013
Entourage	2023
Expedition Unknown	2024
Family Matters	2023
Hangin' with Mr. Cooper	2022
Homicide: Life on the Street	1999–2002
MythBusters	2022–23
NYPD Blue	2001–06
Profiler	2000–04
Step by Step	2022–23
Wipeout	2011–14
Wiseguy	2000–01
World's Wildest Police Videos	2002–11
Stupid Pet Tricks	2024
Eastbound & Down	2025

=== Sports ===
Title	Year(s) aired
MetroPCS Friday Night Knockout	2015
NCAA Beach Volleyball Championship	2016 & 2017
NBA on TNT (simulcasts and alternate broadcasts)	2024–2025
TNT NBA Tip-Off (simulcasts)	2024–2025
Inside the NBA (simulcasts)	2024–2025
