= TruTV (United Kingdom and Ireland) =

British television channel, 2014–2019

- Country: United Kingdom
- Broadcast area: United Kingdom; Ireland

Programming
- Picture format: 576i (16:9 SDTV)
- Timeshift service: TruTV +1

Ownership
- Owner: Sony Pictures Television (branding licensed from WarnerMedia International)

History
- Launched: 4 August 2014; 12 years ago (12 years, 89 days)
- Closed: 12 February 2019 (4 years, 192 days)
- Replaced by: True Crime

Links
- Website: www.truechannels.tv

TruTV was a British free-to-air television channel owned by Sony Pictures Television. The channel was launched on 4 August 2014 by Turner Broadcasting System as TruTV. It was replaced by True Crime on 12 February 2019.

== History ==
In May 2014, Turner Broadcasting System announced that they would launch TruTV, a separate British version of the US channel of the same name. On 13 June 2014, TruTV launched a placeholder on Freeview channel 68. On 24 July 2014, the TruTV placeholder launched on Sky channel 565.

=== TruTV ===
On 4 August 2014, TruTV was launched.

In mid-December 2016, the then current owners Turner threatened to close down the channel if a last-minute funding deal could not be agreed. It cited the fact that the channel had failed to attract an audience, even with some of its biggest shows like America's Got Talent. Original commissions were a part of the channel's early plans to build upon US shows. Ian McDonough, senior vice-president and managing director of Northern Europe at Turner Broadcasting said in February 2015: "We want to move quite quickly with this channel, so I don’t think we'll wait too long. By year two, we want to start looking at UK commissions." Due to the lack of audience, this never came to pass.

On 16 February 2017, Sony Pictures Television acquired the channel from Turner. The channel continued to license its name and logo from its previous parent, which will still represent ad sales for the channel.

In early 2019, the Freeview broadcast area of truTV was reduced to Greater Manchester only, via the legacy GMAN multiplex, with Sony Crime Channel moving to the Comux slot, and True Entertainment moving from its original allocation (which was unavailable in Wales) to the prior Sony Crime berth (truTV's pre-2018 position).

The Turner-owned truTV name in the UK was closed on 12 February 2019 and was replaced by True Crime.

==== Local-TV simulcasts ====
On 25 May 2017, TruTV began broadcasting on Freeview in two daily programming blocks on the Made Television network of channels, as part of a programming supply agreement. The eight stations in the Birmingham, Bristol, Cardiff, Leeds, Liverpool, Middlesbrough, Mold and Tyne and Wear areas simulcast TruTV every day from 13.00 to 17.00 and 21.00 to 01.00 (20.00–24.00 on Tuesdays to accommodate America's Got Talent). This, however, has since been replaced by a supply agreement with CBS Reality in November 2017.

=== Programming ===
Most of TruTV's programming originally aired domestically in the United States. Programming ranges from TruTV programming, such as I, Detective and Bait Car to factual reality programming such as Hardcore Pawn and Container Wars, as well as programmes such as Fear Factor and Conan.

Unlike its US counterpart which relaunched in October 2014 with a new focus on humour while retaining its reality format and a revamped logo, the original British version didn't follow suit. In March 2015, it was announced that the channel would broadcast RuPaul's Drag Race. Season 4 started airing in June 2015. As a result, Conan was moved to the later time of 01.00, rather than airing in its original slot of 23.00.

On 9 April 2015, TruTV began airing Branson Famous.

On 9 June 2015, it was announced that TruTV would become the UK home of America's Got Talent, taking over from ITV2. It will start airing the tenth season later in the summer.

In November and December 2016, TruTV began airing Adult Swim shows, such as Mr. Pickles, Robot Chicken and Rick and Morty, on Fridays from 23.00.

== Programming ==
- America's Got Talent (season 10 onwards)
- Bait Car
- Branson Famous
- Body of Evidence
- North Mission Road
- Snapped
- The People's Court
- Hot Bench
- Ink Master
- Psychic Detectives
- Crime Stories
- Fatal Vows
- Paranormal Survivor
- Masterminds
- Fear Thy Neighbor
- A Stranger In My Home
- LA Forensics
- Tattoo Rescue
- Bad Ink
- Tattoo Nightmares
- Conan
- I, Detective
- RuPaul's Drag Race
- Hardcore Pawn
- Container Wars
- Fear Factor
- The Carbonaro Effect
- Conspiracy Theory with Jesse Ventura
- South Beach Tow
- Hack My Life
- Bear Swamp Recovery
- Passport to Murder

== TruTV +1 ==
On 28 August 2014, a placeholder channel for TruTV +1 launched on Freeview channel 69. It launched on 5 October 2014. TruTV +1 launched on Sky channel 271 on 1 June 2015. On 15 March 2017, TruTV +1 timeshares with TruTV to be broadcasting from 4am to 5am, The +1 service still broadcasts 24 hours a day on other platforms. On 6 February 2018, TruTV +1 closed on Freeview to be replaced by Sony Crime Channel and its normal service will be on channel 60, with Sony Crime Channel +1 taking its old TruTV +1 channel slot on channel 69. Because of this, TruTV is now in local TV areas. On 30 December 2016 truTV+1 was temporarily removed from Sky 271, and relaunched on channel 186 on 27 June 2017. On 1 May 2018, TruTV+1 moved from Sky channel 186 to Sky channel 280. On 19 June 2018, TruTV+1 returned to Freeview on channel 92 in Manchester only service, but moved to channel 69 on 4 July 2018. On 7 January 2019, TruTV was removed from the Freeview Local TV multiplex and became a Manchester only service, broadcast on the Greater Manchester Freeview multiplex alongside TruTV +1.
