= List of programs broadcast by True Crime Network =

The following is a list of programs broadcast on True Crime Network, a television network in the United States designed for digital subchannels of broadcast television stations. The majority of the programs are crime, investigation and procedural programs sourced from Turner Entertainment, but includes content from other production companies.

== Current programming ==
=== Acquired programming ===
- Almost Unsolved
- Dateline
- Dr. G: Medical Examiner
- Finally Caught
- Forensic Factor (October 26, 2015 – present)
- Heartland Homicide
- Killer Cases
- Killer Kids
- The Last 24
- Meet, Marry Murder
- Most Shocking (October 26, 2015 – present)
- The New Detectives (October 26, 2015 – present)
- Paranormal Survivor
- Trace of Evil

=== E/I programming ===
- Animal Rescue
- Missing Unsolved Cases

== Former programming ==
=== Original programming ===
- Killing Spree co-produced with TwoFour Productions
- Inside the Mind of a Serial Killer co-produced with Zodiak Productions

=== Acquired programming ===
- Alaska State Troopers
- Bait Car
- Body of Evidence
- Border Wars
- Cold Blooded
- Cold Case Files
- Dominick Dunne's Power, Privilege, and Justice
- Extreme Evidence
- Forensic Files
- Haunting Evidence
- I, Detective
- The Investigators
- L.A. Forensics
- Locked Up Abroad
- Masterminds
- Missing Persons Unit
- Murder by the Book
- Murder She Solved
- North Mission Road
- Ocean Force
- Over the Limit
- Parco P.I.
- Psychic Detectives
- Rescue 911
- Solved
