= Beach Patrol =

- Country of origin: United States
- Original language: English
- No. of seasons: 3
- No. of episodes: 29

Production
- Camera setup: On location
- Running time: 30 min.

Original release
- Network: Court TV (2006–2007) truTV (2008)
- Release: 2006 – 2008

Beach Patrol is a half-hour television series airing on truTV. The show features lifeguards and police working together to apprehend criminals and save lives.

Each of the program's four seasons have focused on a different city: San Diego, Miami, Honolulu and Huntington Beach.

== Format ==
The basic outline of the show was based on real life moments of lifeguard and other beach patrol work on rescues and arrests. Although there was not much of the footage featured in the show that involved arrests, most of the footage featured rescues and finding missing personnel. The show runs for 30 minutes. A Beach Patrol special called The Best of Beach Patrol ran for 60 minutes. It was only within the San Diego series. The show was originally created and developed in the mid-nineties for the Fox-TV Station Group (FTSP/Foxlab), the same outfit that brought the airwaves COPS and America's Most Wanted. Beach Patrol was the brainchild of an executive at the division who was looking for a companion show for COPS which, ironically, it became, a decade later on another cable network.

== Status ==
The show is currently running on Australian network One (Australian TV channel), and since January 2015, the Justice Network in the United States.

== See also ==
- Ocean Force
- Lifeguard
