= Kevin Pereira =

American game show host and TV personality

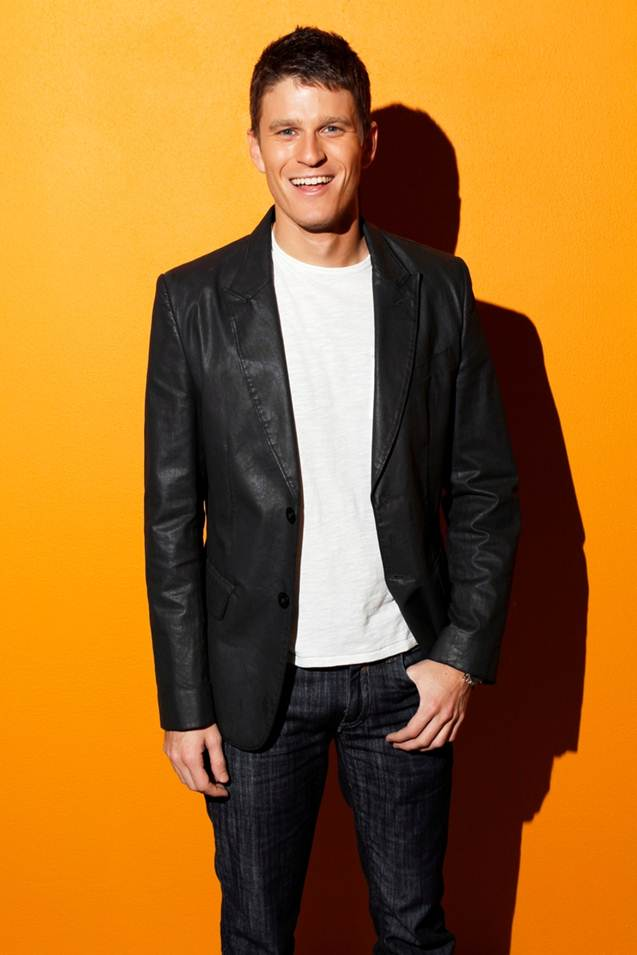
- Pereira in 2012
- Born: December 28, 1982 (age 43); Rochester, Michigan, U.S.
- Occupation: Television personality
- Years active: 2002–present
- Television: Attack of the Show, The Attack, Hack My Life
- Partner(s): Meg Turney (2010–2012); Brea Grant (2013–2015)
- Website: www.kevinpereira.com

Kevin Elder Pereira (born December 28, 1982) is an American television personality and host.

== Early life ==
At 14, Pereira hosted Pointless Audio under the pseudonym Captain Immy. The show featured many prank calls and was hosted on such gaming sites as Planet Quake and ShugaShack (now Shacknews); it later evolved into Pointless TV, and finally LickMySweaty.com. One of the projects featured on the latter site, a short film created for his video production class at Deer Valley High School, earned him three California Media Festival awards in 2001. A different film project was recognized in 2002. He studied film and television production with a scholarship to the Academy of Art University in San Francisco, California for one semester.

== Career ==
After working as a network administrator at an Internet service provider for five years and also at a television network, he pursued a career at G4. He started as a production assistant in 2002 on the talk show G4tv.com, then moved on to Arena and Pulse and then quickly moved to another G4 show, The Screen Savers, in 2004. Pereira was a co-host of Attack of the Show!, G4's live tech info show, and was the last original cast member to leave. He co-hosted the show for a year with Sarah Lane, who left in 2006, followed by Olivia Munn, who left in 2010. In 2011 Candace Bailey joined Pereira as co-host. He hosted his last episode of Attack of the Show! on May 31, 2012, after it was announced on May 8, 2012, by G4 that his final broadcast would take place on that day. His final broadcast for the channel was their Electronic Entertainment Expo coverage, preceded by a month-long retrospective of highlights from the show. Pereira also produced a show for Syfy titled Viral Video Showdown.

He formerly hosted the syndicated quiz show Let's Ask America until 2014, when MTV VJ Bill Bellamy took over. On October 4, 2012, Pereira launched his podcast Pointless on the Deathsquad podcast network, but later moved to hosting his podcast on SuperCreative.

Pereira appeared as a co-host on the political webshow The Young Turks on February 4, 2013, alongside long-time co-host of the show Ana Kasparian.

In 2014, Pereira launched a Twitch channel called The Attack, which ran until 2018 when he shut it down after it was discovered that Pereira had violated Twitch terms of service.

Pereira was the co-host of Hack My Life that ended in 2018, on TruTV with Brooke Van Poppelen.

On February 12, 2021, G4 announced that Pereira would return to host Attack of the Show! on the relaunched network. In September 2022, he announced he would be leaving the network; his last day was September 21, 2022.

In April 2023, Pereira started the podcast AI For Humans.

== Filmography ==
Year	Title	Director	Writer	Producer	Notes
2012	Viral Video Showdown	No	Yes	Yes	

=== Television acting roles and Twitch roles ===
Year	Title	Role	Notes
2005–2012, 2021–2022	Attack of the Show!	Himself/host	On G4TV
2008	Code Monkeys	Fast Food Manager	Episode: "The Great Recession"
2015–2018	Hack My Life	Himself/host	
2015–2018	The Attack	Host	

=== Film acting roles ===
Year	Title	Role	Notes
2016	Holidays	TV Announcer (segment: "New Year's") (voice)	
