= List of The Carbonaro Effect episodes =

The Carbonaro Effect is an American hidden camera-magic reality television series that premiered on TruTV on April 1, 2014. It follows magician Michael Carbonaro as he stages elaborate illusions and pranks on everyday people while being filmed by hidden cameras.

== Series overview ==
| Season | Episodes | Originally released | |
| Season | Episodes | First released | Last released |
|---|---|---|---|
| 1 | 25 | April 1, 2014 | January 22, 2015 |
| 2 | 26 | July 29, 2015 | June 8, 2016 |
| 3 | 17 | February 1, 2017 | January 18, 2018 |
| 4 | 16 | May 17, 2018 | February 7, 2019 |
| 5 | 9 | November 7, 2019 | January 9, 2020 |
| Double Takes | 12 | January 18, 2018 | August 1, 2019 |
| Specials | 13 | July 31, 2014 | June 6, 2019 |

== Episodes ==
=== Season 1 (2014–15) ===
| No. | Title | Original release date | US viewers (millions) |
|---|---|---|---|
| 1 | "Got the Bug Out" | April 1, 2014 | N/A |
Actual bugs in phones; bottomless beer bottles; freeze-drying and reanimating animals.
| 2 | "A Problem with Chocolate Turtles and Seeds" | May 15, 2014 | 1.03 |
A missing person in a grocery store; bowling balls in flat boxes; swapping ID's in a hotel.
| 3 | "A Waddle, A Scratch..." | May 15, 2014 | 1.03 |
A duck fools thrift store shoppers; an endless chain of hangers; cheese corks in a liquor store; freezing wine; destroying and reconstructing art in a museum.
| 4 | "Just Smash it Out" | May 22, 2014 | 1.13 |
Broken windows at a car wash; mischief at the dry cleaner's; pet shoppers see fish in a dry water bowl.
| 5 | "Out of Bounce" | May 29, 2014 | 1.17 |
Too good to be true toys; Michael poses as an insanely sweaty personal trainer; a security guard panics over a disappearing car.
| 6 | "Don't Freeze Me!" | June 5, 2014 | 0.81 |
A light box turns heavy in a sporting goods store; Michael poses as a barista for a glass illusion; a boomerang in a museum; taxidermy mischief.
| 7 | "The Lizard Law" | June 12, 2014 | 1.16 |
| 8 | "It's a Makeshift" | June 19, 2014 | 1.01 |
Michael manages to make a man's day after he convinces him that he's won a jackpot at a laundromat after using a slot machine.
| 9 | "Green Friendly" | June 26, 2014 | 1.16 |
Some wine drinkers are left feeling confused with an incredible shrinking bottle while a jewelry store patron is shocked by some disappearing diamonds.
| 10 | "Maybe it's the Echinacea?" | July 10, 2014 | 0.93 |
Pets that hatch out of balloons; valets that park cars without sitting in them.
| 11 | "Serious Deja Vu" | July 17, 2014 | N/A |
Michael refutes distillation while turning water into liquor; coffee shop customers are shocked; Michael gives a man deja vu.
| 12 | "An Elevated Ferret Alert" | July 24, 2014 | 1.07 |
| 13 | "Out of Control" | October 30, 2014 | 0.95 |
Instant kale cannoli from Goji sand; teddy bears coming to life.
| 14 | "This is Not an Orange" | November 6, 2014 | 0.85 |
| 15 | "Just During the Previews" | November 13, 2014 | 0.74 |
Snacks for astronauts; a new kind of movie popcorn; an emotional, self-healing glass figurine.
| 16 | "In Case What?!" | November 20, 2014 | 0.80 |
A crabby order of Chinese food; a peanut removing spinning bowl; a serious ethical dilemma.
| 17 | "A Faux Pas to Wear" | November 27, 2014 | 0.95 |
Self-tailoring clothes; math equation-solving chalk boards; beetles undoing nuts and bolts; disappearing and reappearing in an instant.
| 18 | "Just a Milker" | December 4, 2014 | 0.87 |
Special pop-up books; milking almonds; cursed mummy causing problems.
| 19 | "Suburban Pimp" | December 11, 2014 | 0.70 |
spooky vintage dolls; Dorothy costume with its own dog; a day at the arcade goes from fun to freaky.
| 20 | "Might be Trippin'" | December 18, 2014 | 1.07 |
Disrupting student's zen; living frog necklace; a very active mannequin.
| 21 | "An Awogami is Ripe" | December 25, 2014 | 0.96 |
| 22 | "Iguanasaurus" | January 1, 2015 | 0.71 |
Collapsible spray paint can; shrinking leprechaun outfit; hatching dinosaur egg.
| 23 | "3D Galastical Morphin Ranging Power Tents" | January 8, 2015 | 0.76 |
Inflatable hot dogs and fantastic bagging; encased spider comes free and back to life; an owl takes over a store display.
| 24 | "Flash Melt" | January 15, 2015 | 0.86 |
Perfect lotto guesses; genius child at a toy store; taking the cake at a Japanese restaurant.
| 25 | "An Over-Grooming Situation" | January 22, 2015 | 0.68 |
Wireless hose; fashionable canine attire on the runway.

=== Season 2 (2015–16) ===
| No. overall | No. in season | Title | Original release date | US viewers (millions) |
|---|---|---|---|---|
| 26 | 1 | "Just Made History" | July 29, 2015 | 0.78 |
Michael creates juice at a farmer's market. He later pays a visit to an eye doctor's office and messes with a co-worker.
| 27 | 2 | "Dangerously Drinkable" | August 5, 2015 | 0.83 |
A trick ends up being played on the patients of a dental office. An extinct species is brought back to life.
| 27 | 3 | "Japanese Waterless Folding Toilet" | August 12, 2015 | 0.88 |
| 28 | 4 | "The Albino Corn Snake Viper Patrol" | August 19, 2015 | 0.91 |
Michael poses as an employee at a tattoo parlor. Later, he sets a trap during a routine car checkup and messes with some dock workers.
| 29 | 5 | "Amvox 73" | August 26, 2015 | 0.85 |
Peruvian clay turtle; 2 bunnies become 8; a carpenter becomes a glue-smelling time traveller.
| 30 | 6 | "Turn to Gold" | September 9, 2015 | 0.86 |
Miraculous Midas touch liquid; an extreme tanning goes horribly wrong.
| 31 | 7 | "Take the Mirror" | September 16, 2015 | 0.54 |
A loose scorpion in a candy shop; a new drink mix; a cursed mirror.
| 32 | 8 | "Sierra Volcano" | September 23, 2015 | 0.75 |
A time defying skin treatment; pre-historic cheese; a 3D printing accident.
| 33 | 9 | "The Doughy Parts" | September 30, 2015 | 0.62 |
A painter's touch is worth a thousand words; Michael's strange friend is in trouble at the pool.
| 34 | 10 | "That's Voodoo" | October 7, 2015 | 0.62 |
Soothing snakes and stitching spiders; a natural-born whittler; an abandoned house holds on to its things.
| 35 | 11 | "Catch the Flu" | October 14, 2015 | 0.57 |
A man's amazing mind powers; a tribal mask goes missing.
| 36 | 12 | "Deep Space Air" | October 21, 2015 | 0.53 |
Heavy otherworldly air; rolls that defy gravity; the ultimate golfing sand trap.
| 37 | 13 | "Fighguise" | October 28, 2015 | 0.57 |
Printing by hand at a copy shop; fish fashion trends.
| 38 | 14 | "EggShaq" | March 23, 2016 | 0.70 |
Bowling balls' ancient mystery; the world's longest spit-take; Shaquille O'Neal helps to fool a fan. Special Guest: Shaquille O'Neal
| 39 | 15 | "Dead Man Walking" | March 30, 2016 | 0.63 |
Serenading clams out of their shells; a fish stick stowaway; a spirited trick about the afterlife.
| 40 | 16 | "I Am Ogle Thorpe" | April 6, 2016 | 0.60 |
| 41 | 17 | "The Framing Cannon" | April 13, 2016 | 0.59 |
A forceful framing device; a new meaning of instant cash; horsing around with an unexpected deposit; Michael loses his head.
| 42 | 18 | "Skull with a Flower Hat" | April 20, 2016 | 0.61 |
| 43 | 19 | "Warthogs, WogHearts, and Hogwarts" | April 27, 2016 | 0.61 |
| 44 | 20 | "A Positive Presence" | May 4, 2016 | 0.54 |
A corrosive drink is served up by Michael. Later, a trick for sneaker lacing and a woman who rises from the dead.
| 45 | 21 | "Top Priority of NASA" | May 18, 2016 | 0.56 |
A space traveling soup machine; an ear wax removal kit; a healing stone gets stuck; a mover is thrown into a time warp
| 46 | 22 | "Drone Care" | May 25, 2016 | 0.58 |
Petal popping flowers and a frog mutation; a morphing pen and a clothing machine; a cat-dog and a surprise from above.
| 47 | 23 | "Sets Itself, Lights Itself" | June 1, 2016 | 0.66 |
Credit card absorbing containers; sloppy to fancy calligraphy; chinaware sets itself.
| 48 | 24 | "A Living Trilobite" | June 8, 2016 | 0.61 |
| 49 | 25 | "House of Horrors" | June 15, 2016 | 0.65 |
| 50 | 26 | "He's a Professional Dude" | June 22, 2016 | 0.63 |
A traveling squeak; a mind-bending cops and robbers game.

=== Season 3 (2017–18) ===
| No. overall | No. in season | Title | Original release date | US viewers (millions) |
|---|---|---|---|---|
| 51 | 1 | "Incredibly Unsettling" | February 1, 2017 | 0.60 |
| 52 | 2 | "Holy Moly Mirror" | February 8, 2017 | 0.54 |
| 53 | 3 | "Bro, They're Surrounding Us!" | February 15, 2017 | N/A |
| 54 | 4 | "It's a Chicken, Sir" | February 22, 2017 | N/A |
| 55 | 5 | "Wait, My Chair!" | March 1, 2017 | N/A |
Fruits and vegetables' transformative properties; dairy's true power; termites chew through the scenery.
| 56 | 6 | "Soliciting Statue" | March 8, 2017 | N/A |
Impossible clothes organization; lurking food surprises; two people tricked at once.
| 57 | 7 | "Speed Thieves" | March 22, 2017 | N/A |
Michael and his fellow employees debate the authenticity of a giant lizard and find a game with a very specific target audience.
| 58 | 8 | "The Impractically Carbonaro Jokers Effect" | March 29, 2017 | N/A |
Special Guests: The Tenderloins (Joe Gatto, James Murray, Brian Quinn, and Sal Vulcano)
| 59 | 9 | "A Similar Rock Energy" | November 9, 2017 | N/A |
Special Guest: Jack Black
| 60 | 10 | "Kind of Like a Seafoam Green" | November 16, 2017 | N/A |
| 61 | 11 | "Super Saturn Moon Travel" | November 30, 2017 | N/A |
Exploding fruit and levitating sparklers; innovations in hemp technology; a time capsule blows minds.
| 62 | 12 | "Cuban Assimilatory Persea Plant" | December 7, 2017 | N/A |
| 63 | 13 | "Pixelated Vision" | December 14, 2017 | N/A |
| 64 | 14 | "Italian Food Matter" | December 21, 2017 | N/A |
| 65 | 15 | "Industrial Asphalt Sealant" | December 28, 2017 | N/A |
A dog just can't hold it; a shampoo that gives new look; lightening the load; a whole man disappears in a man hole
| 66 | 16 | "Pineapple Breeze" | January 4, 2018 | N/A |
| 67 | 17 | "The Essence of The Wings" | January 11, 2018 | N/A |
Living loofas and leftovers into beauty products; jumping into other music genres; rising dangers of babysitting.

=== Season 4 (2018–19) ===
| No. overall | No. in season | Title | Original release date | US viewers (millions) |
|---|---|---|---|---|
| 68 | 1 | "Total Face Rejuvenation" | May 17, 2018 | 0.405 |
| 68 | 2 | "Relax the Back" | May 24, 2018 | 0.374 |
| 69 | 3 | "The Snowball" | May 31, 2018 | 0.399 |
| 70 | 4 | "You've Been Marked" | June 7, 2018 | 0.290 |
| 71 | 5 | "Simon Soft" | June 14, 2018 | 0.364 |
| 72 | 6 | "Whippit" | June 28, 2018 | 0.408 |
A mind-boggling app; self-brewing decoration; a spirited scarecrow.
| 73 | 7 | "The Food Flattener" | July 5, 2018 | 0.390 |
Michael gets crabby with salad; breath-cooked meatballs; bone-chilling cryotherapy.
| 74 | 8 | "Dr. Bones" | July 12, 2018 | 0.396 |
| 75 | 9 | "There's Life in Here" | December 13, 2018 | 0.283 |
| 76 | 10 | "Prehistoric Fossil Breeding" | December 20, 2018 | 0.342 |
Fish fossil breeding and a tongue coloring at a paint store; a skeleton with a little life left.
| 77 | 11 | "Vegan Plant" | December 27, 2018 | 0.293 |
| 78 | 12 | "Sorcery or Science" | January 10, 2019 | 0.328 |
| 79 | 13 | "Fight or Flight" | January 17, 2019 | 0.305 |
Breeding brie at a cheese store; nailing down the perfect app; ruffling feathers in an airport.
| 80 | 14 | "Fright at the Museum" | January 24, 2019 | 0.306 |
| 81 | 15 | "Dummy Talks" | January 31, 2019 | 0.286 |
| 82 | 16 | "Home Run Away" | February 7, 2019 | 0.315 |
Power tool baking; costume changes that suit a tux store; a fiery trick at a baseball stadium.

=== Season 5 (2019–20) ===
| No. overall | No. in season | Title | Original release date | US viewers (millions) |
|---|---|---|---|---|
| 83 | 1 | "Cat Lady" | November 7, 2019 | 0.353 |
Amazing costume changes; flying post-it notes; a shape-shifting tenant
| 84 | 2 | "Moving Dragon" | November 14, 2019 | 0.260 |
Aerodynamic kickboard; impossible hamster breeding; a fiery statue
| 85 | 3 | "Lipstick and the Flying Nun" | November 21, 2019 | 0.249 |
Antique shop shenanigans; nun comes back from the grave
| 86 | 4 | "Pink Slime" | December 5, 2019 | 0.181 |
Hungry bookworms; "grass-fed" beef; spooky experiment
| 87 | 5 | "Chilly Flakes and Wormholes" | December 12, 2019 | 0.206 |
| 88 | 6 | "Popcorn Pants" | December 19, 2019 | 0.268 |
| 89 | 7 | "Vanishing Daycare" | December 26, 2019 | 0.239 |
| 90 | 8 | "Puppification" | January 2, 2020 | 0.261 |
| 91 | 9 | TBA | January 9, 2020 | 0.242 |

== Double Takes ==
| No. | Title | Original release date | US viewers (millions) |
|---|---|---|---|
| 1 | "Double Takes" | January 18, 2018 | 0.402 |
Michael gives a fresh look to old tricks with never-before-seen footage. From the arcade to the science lab, Michael revisits footage from the cutting room floor.
| 2 | "Double Takes 2" | June 21, 2018 | 0.420 |
| 3 | "Double Takes 3" | July 19, 2018 | 0.388 |
| 4 | "Double Takes 4" | February 14, 2019 | 0.296 |
| 5 | "Back to the Big Dig" | June 13, 2019 | 0.359 |
| 6 | "Back to Back in Time" | June 20, 2019 | 0.294 |
| 7 | "Back to Fight or Flight" | June 27, 2019 | 0.316 |
Reanimating a chameleon fish; rebooting lengthy corks; remaking the airport bird man; more with all-new reactions.
| 8 | "Back to the Ice" | July 4, 2019 | 0.288 |
| 9 | "Back to the Meet and Greet" | July 11, 2019 | 0.211 |
Michael remakes hungry chocolate bunnies, the mind-blowing wind app, a magical fan encounter, and more with new reactions!
| 10 | "Back to the Aztec Portal" | July 18, 2019 | 0.233 |
Michael reopens an Aztec portal, reanimates robotic pigeons, instant Vortex Shipping, and more. All with new reactions.
| 11 | "Back to Back Again Boxes" | July 25, 2019 | 0.227 |
Michael toys with the tanning bed again, reboots Copper Monkey, the incessant moving boxes, and more with new reactions!
| 12 | "Back to the Locked Booth" | August 1, 2019 | 0.277 |
Michael remakes the ski shop lineage, car wash stowaway, disappearing staircase bits and more. All with new reactions!

== Specials ==
| No. | Title | Original release date | US viewers (millions) |
|---|---|---|---|
| 1 | "Cause and Effect" | July 31, 2014 | N/A |
Breaking the laws of physics and technology; finding out they are on a TV show, some people react better than others.
| 2 | "Cause and Effect Second Edition" | April 1, 2015 | N/A |
Behind-the-scenes with a potato laser and an unusual puppy; Michael gets recognized mid-stunt and has the tables turned; more TV reactions.
| 3 | "Exposed" | April 1, 2015 | N/A |
Behind-the-scenes of Season 1; answering viewers' questions and insider footage of the most popular tricks.
| 4 | "Critter Countdown" | March 2, 2016 | N/A |
| 5 | "Top 5 Freakouts" | March 9, 2016 | N/A |
| 6 | "Secret Stash" | May 11, 2016 | N/A |
| 7 | "Behind the Curtain" | June 29, 2016 | N/A |
| 8 | "Trick Plays" | February 1, 2017 | N/A |
| 9 | "Gadgets and Gizmos" | February 8, 2017 | 0.53 |
Michael's favorite mind-bending inventions; an electric removable eyeball; a 3D printing pen; the best reactions to creations.
| 10 | "Over the Line" | March 8, 2017 | N/A |
| 11 | "Hit or Miss" | March 22, 2017 | N/A |
Sometimes Michael gets outsmarted, sometimes nobody notices that the magic happened at all, and sometimes Michael accidentally recommends poisoning his viewers.
| 12 | "Holiday Survival Guide" | November 23, 2017 | N/A |
| 13 | "100th Episode Special" | June 6, 2019 | 0.299 |
