= Bob Kushell =

American television writer and producer (born 1969)

- Born: January 29, 1969 (age 57)
- Occupations: Television writer, television producer
- Relatives: Lisa Arch (sister)
- Awards: Golden Globe Award

Bob Kushell (born January 29, 1969) is an American television writer and producer.

== Career ==
Kushell has written for network television comedies including The Simpsons, 3rd Rock from the Sun, Malcolm in the Middle, Grounded for Life, American Dad!, Samantha Who?, Suburgatory, Anger Management, and Fam. In 2015, Kushell joined Bill Prady to co-create The Muppets, which ran for 1 season on ABC Television and won a Nickelodeon Kids' Choice Award.

Kushell is also the creator and writer of Way to Go, a comedy series for the UK's BBC Three about three men who start an assisted suicide business. It was first commissioned by the BBC in November 2012.

In December 2008, he hosted his own online talk show, co-created with his brother-in-law Russell Arch, Anytime with Bob Kushell, on Crackle. The show was a fully featured talk show in five minutes, including a one-joke monologue, a comedy bit and an interview with a celebrity guest. The show ran for two seasons.

== Awards ==
Kushell has been nominated for two primetime Emmy Awards and won a Golden Globe. Paley Center for Media has preserved the first season Salute Your Shorts episode "Sponge Saga" in its New York archive, which had its teleplay written by Kushell.
