= Donald Piper =

Donald Piper may refer to:

- Donald Piper (basketball)
- Donald Piper (murderer)
