= Lisa Arch =

American actress and comedian

- Born: Lisa Kushell; Los Angeles, California, U.S.
- Occupations: Actress, comedian
- Years active: 1993–present
- Spouse: Russell Arch
- Children: 1
- Relatives: Bob Kushell (brother)

Lisa Arch (née Kushell) is an American actress and comedian, known for her recurring role on Curb Your Enthusiasm as Cassie the wife of Larry's cousin, Andy, her roles in the 1997–98 season of the FOX Network comedy show, Mad TV, as cohost of TBS's Dinner and a Movie from 2002 to 2005, and as the recurring character of Samantha Samuels on Disney Channel's Cory in the House. Arch has also been in movies, such as 2001's Legally Blonde.

== Personal life ==
Born Lisa Kushell in Los Angeles, California, she began acting on stage at 15 years old in the sketch comedy troupe Upstage Comedy. Arch credits Whoopi Goldberg's valley girl monologue as the reason she got into acting. Arch has often stated that her parents were extremely supportive of her and they allowed her to hone her skills in their "unfurnished living room" until she graduated from high school. She earned her SAG card with one line as a waitress on Dream On. After her first appearance, she began appearing on such shows as Seinfeld, The X-Files, and For Your Love.

She has an older brother, Bob Kushell, who is a TV writer/producer and Internet talk show host. Her brother worked with her husband Russell Arch in 2009, as the co-creator and executive producer of Anytime with Bob Kushell, an internet talk show for Sony Interactive's Crackle.com.

On September 18, 2007, she gave birth to a son, Garrett Mitchell Arch. Lisa lives with her husband, son and 2 small dogs.

Arch is Jewish.

== Career ==
=== Curb Your Enthusiasm ===
Arch was cast on Curb Your Enthusiasm in 2009 as "Cassie", the wife of Larry's "Cousin Andy" played by Richard Kind. She appeared in the Season 7 episode entitled "The Black Swan" and played a new mom who had a side-business where she made colorful, ornate cowboy hats. She also appeared in season 10 episodes #2 & #3 entitled "Side Sitting" and "Artificial Fruit". In "Fruit" she has a featured role where she asks Larry to draw a doodle for charity, but later on blames him for not putting in enough effort on his artwork.

=== Mad TV ===
Arch joined the cast of Mad TV in 1997, as a repertory performer, for the third season. She would be promoted to repertory status mid-season. She is remembered for playing characters like social outcast Susan Whitfield and sassy country gal Wanda Terry-Ann Lainier Parker from the Parker Sisters sketches.

Arch did celebrity impressions, such as Paula Jones, Farrah Fawcett, Demi Moore, Alyson Hannigan, Lori Loughlin, Melanie C, Alanis Morissette, and Fiona Apple.

After one season on the show, Arch left Mad TV at the conclusion of season three to pursue other career opportunities.

=== Other television projects ===
Since Leaving Mad TV, Arch has done many guest appearances and voice overs. She has appeared in such commercials as "Mervyn's" and "Southern Comfort."

She has featured on the Comedy Central show Crank Yankers as the voice of "Cammie", an airheaded, bisexual party-girl in her early twenties. She also played the role of Samantha Samuels on the Disney Channel show Cory in the House. She has also had a part in the children's TV program Hannah Montana as a photographer. Arch can be seen on a regular basis at Los Angeles' ACME Comedy Theater and recently hosted a special episode of Reel Comedy about the movie, Bewitched. She also has made numerous guest appearances on television shows, including Reno 911!, Seinfeld, and The X-Files. Also she was in Austin & Ally as Damonica Dixon.

=== Dinner and a Movie ===
In 2001, Arch's career got a boost when she replaced Annabelle Gurwitch as the hostess of the TBS cooking and entertainment show, Dinner and a Movie. For two and a half years, she appeared, alongside host Paul Gilmartin and chef Claud Mann, in each episode introducing movies and cracking jokes during the preparation of a creative dinner to go with some theme of the movie.

== Filmography ==
=== Film ===
Year	Title	Other notes
2007	Evan Almighty	Staffer
2005	I'm Not Gay	Chris
2005	Guess Who	Woman at Elevator
2003	Windy City Heat	Susan B. Anthony
2001	The Comedy Team of Pete & James	Gwen
2001	Legally Blonde	Boutique Saleswoman
1999	Dirt Merchant	XTV Reporter
1998	Billboard Dad	Woman #2

=== Television ===
Year	Title	Role	Other notes
2026	Life, Larry and the Pursuit of Unhappiness	Mrs. Harrison	Episode 7 ("Lawrence")
2023	Pretty Freekin Scary	Principal Peppers	Recurring
2014–2016	100 Things To Do Before High School	Principal Hader	Recurring
2013	Dance Moms	Herself	Season 3 episode 26
2013	Big Time Rush	Stepmother	"Big Time Cameo"
2012	Austin & Ally	Demonica Dixon	1 episode
2010	Good Luck Charlie	Girl at ballgame	1 episode
2009	Curb Your Enthusiasm	Cassie	1 episode
2008	Weeds	Maddy Shaheen	1 episode
2008–2011	Clean House	Herself	Back-up host
2007–2008	Cory in the House	Samantha Samuels	Recurring role
2006–2009	Hannah Montana	Liza (the photographer)	3 episodes
2006	Half & Half	Dr. Swenson	
2004	Significant Others	Girl at Bar	
2003	Charmed	Tour Guide	
2003	Windy City Heat	Suzanne/Jiggly Wrigley	
2003	For Your Love	Kathy McCulloch	
2003	Reno 911!	Stripper with Dispute	
2002	Dinner and a Movie	Host	
2000	The X Files	Call Girl	Episode: "Orison"
1998	Michael Hayes	Rhonda	
1997–1998	Mad TV	Various Characters	
1996	Seinfeld	Connie	"The Friar's Club"
1994	Attack of the 5 Ft. 2 In. Women	Dotty	
1993	Dream On	Waitress	

=== Voice acting and video game ===
Year	Title	Role	Other notes
2004	Outlaw Golf 2	Trixie	Video game
2002–2005	Crank Yankers	Cammie	Puppet Comedy TV Series
2000	Mission Hill	Stacy/Miss Colleen Peck/Chola Girl/Tina	TV series
