= Bait car =

Decoy car used to catch car thieves

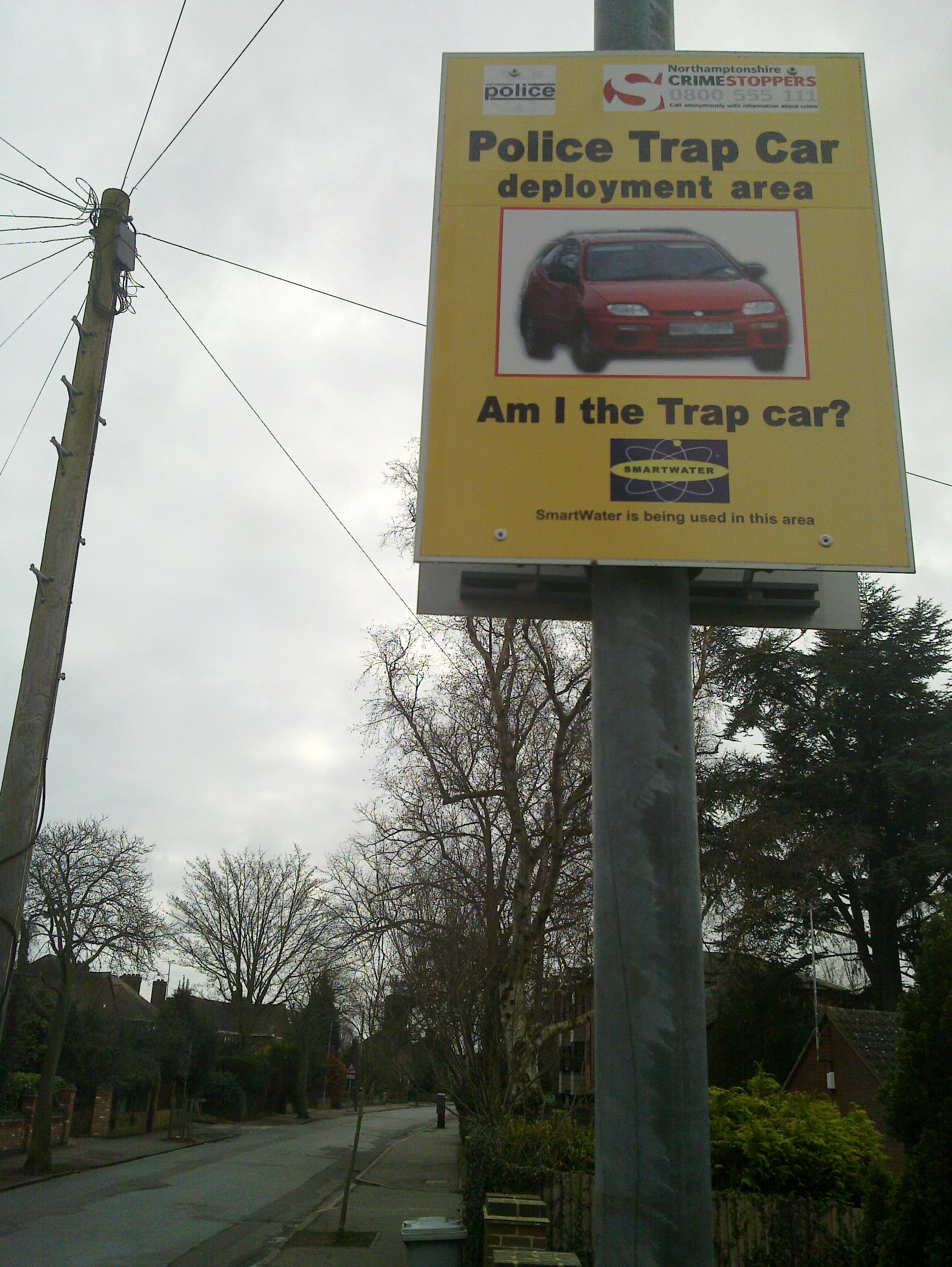
A sign warning of a police trap car deployment area, in the United Kingdom

A bait car, also called a decoy car, hot car, or trap car, is a vehicle used by law enforcement agencies to capture car thieves or thieves who steal items from cars. The vehicles are modified with audio/video surveillance technology, and can be remotely monitored and controlled. Those set up to catch car thieves may include GPS tracking. A "kill switch" may be installed in the vehicle allowing police to remotely disable the engine and lock all doors, preventing escape. A car set up to catch thieves who steal items from cars may be disabled so that it cannot be started and have specially prepared "bait property".

== Overview ==
The bait car, often filled with valuable items to draw attention to it, is typically parked in a high-auto-theft area. In usual cases, the vehicle is simply left unlocked with the keys in the ignition. If the car is set up to catch car thieves, when the car is stolen officers are immediately alerted, and can monitor the vehicle and send commands to control it such as disabling the engine, locking the doors or honking the horn. Live audio or video streaming devices may be installed allowing law enforcement personnel to determine how many suspects are in the car, what they are planning and if they are armed. If the bait car is set up to catch thieves who steal items from cars, it may be monitored by video from a central location. The bait property, such as a tool kit or gym bag, will also be set up so it can be tracked and monitored.

Bait cars can be used as part of a honey trap, a form of sting operation, in which criminals not known to the police are lured into exposing themselves. Unlike a sting operation that targets a known or suspected criminal, a honey trap establishes a general lure to attract unknown criminals. Bait cars are not considered entrapment because they merely afford criminals the opportunity to steal the car; entrapment constitutes law enforcement persuading or encouraging a person to commit a crime that they would not have committed otherwise.

== By country ==
=== Australia ===
Police in Perth started using bait cars in 2015.

=== Canada ===
The largest bait car fleet in North America, which employs the Minneapolis model, is operated by the Integrated Municipal Provincial Auto Crime Team (IMPACT), based in Surrey, British Columbia. Surrey was designated the "car theft capital of North America" by the Royal Canadian Mounted Police in 2002. Their bait car program was launched by the Vancouver Police in 2002 and has contributed to a 55% drop in auto theft since then.

=== New Zealand ===
As of 2014, police in Auckland were "considering" using bait cars.

=== United Kingdom ===
In 2002, a bait car program was launched in Essex, inspired by the Minneapolis model.

=== United States ===
In 2010, the Anti-Vehicle Crime Association of Minnesota presented an award to the Minneapolis Police for its Bait Vehicle Program, which had been running for twelve years at the time.

Police in Columbus, Ohio, used a bait car outfitted with surveillance technology to catch three 15- and 17-year-old car thieves.

== In mass media ==
Bait cars (and the stings they are used in) have been featured in numerous documentary and reality television programs, including COPS, World's Wildest Police Videos, and Jacked: Auto Theft Task Force. They were also the exclusive focus of the TruTV television series Bait Car.
