= MetroPCS Friday Night Knockout =

- The logo for MetroPCS Friday Night Knockout on TruTV.
- Also known as: Friday Night Knockout
- Genre: Professional boxing bouts
- Presented by: Bruce Beck; Timothy Bradley; Kevin Kugler; Ray Mancini; Crystina Poncher
- Country of origin: United States
- Original language: English

Production
- Camera setup: Multi-camera
- Running time: Various
- Production companies: HBO Sports; Turner Sports; Top Rank

Original release
- Network: TruTV
- Release: May 1 – December 11, 2015

Related
- Premier Boxing Champions

Friday Night Knockout (visually known as MetroPCS Friday Night Knockout for sponsorship reasons) was the branding used for professional boxing telecasts broadcast on the cable network TruTV. This weekly broadcast was co-produced by HBO and Turner Sports.

== Coverage overview ==
What separated TruTV's broadcasts from the time buy deals done by Al Haymon’s Premier Boxing Champions on other networks is that advertising on TruTV was 100% sold by Turner Sports. In other words, Turner controlled all the advertising, including TV commercial time, digital inventory and sponsorships.

MetroPCS Friday Night Knockout debuted on May 1, 2015 (from The Chelsea at The Cosmopolitan of Las Vegas) and featured at least eight bouts from the Top Rank promotion. They would serve as lead-ins for fights airing on HBO the next day.

The final card aired on December 11, 2015 with Nonito Donaire vs. Cesar Juarez and Félix Verdejo taking on Josenilson Dos Santos from San Juan, Puerto Rico.

MetroPCS Friday Night Knockout was not renewed after its first season.

=== Technology ===
TruTV's live boxing telecasts featured the first-ever domestic use of “Spidercam” technology, which operates on a four-point system of cables from designated points beyond the corners of the boxing ring. It also has the ability to operate on a four-point system of cables from designated points beyond the corners of the boxing ring.

== Commentators ==
Kevin Kugler and Bruce Beck provided play-by-play with analysts Ray “Boom Boom” Mancini and Timothy Bradley and reporter Crystina Poncher.
