= Michael Carbonaro =

American actor, magician, and improv artist (born 1976)

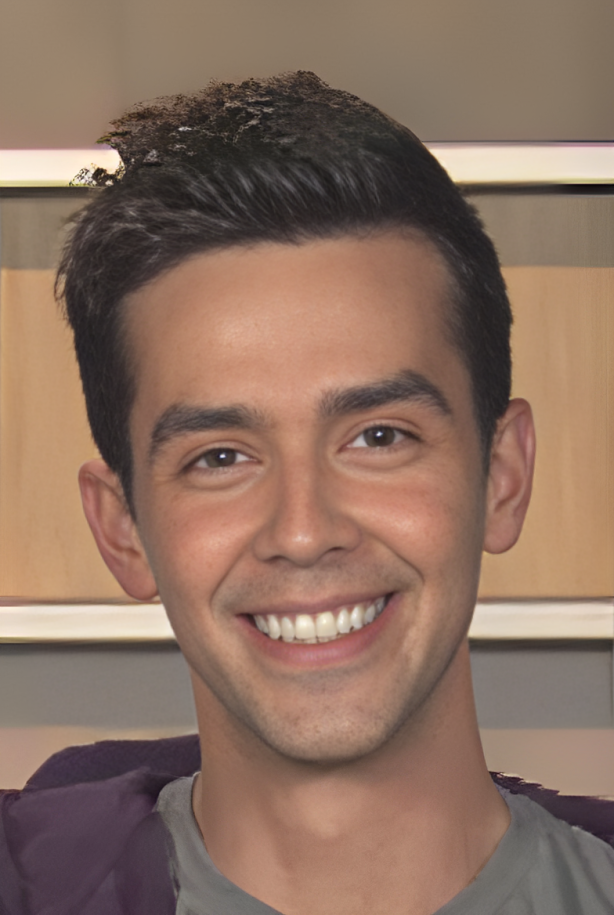
- Carbonaro in 2014
- Born: Michael Joseph Carbonaro; 1975 or 1976 (age 50–51); Oakdale, New York, United States
- Occupations: Actor, magician
- Years active: 1999–present
- Spouse: Peter Stickles (m. 2014)

Michael Joseph Carbonaro (born 1975 or 1976) is an American actor, magician, and improv artist.

== Early life ==
Born and raised in Oakdale, New York, on Long Island, the younger of two sons of an electrician father and a nurse mother, he attended Connetquot High School in Bohemia, New York. He began performing magic professionally while growing up, earning his college tuition while still in his teens. He holds a bachelor's degree in drama from the Tisch School of the Arts at NYU.

== Career ==
He is known for his hidden-camera "Magic Clerk" segments on The Tonight Show, in which he tricks unsuspecting customers at a convenience store. This led to a television series with a similar premise, The Carbonaro Effect, which premiered on TruTV on May 15, 2014, following a preview episode on April 1, 2014.

In 2004, he was featured on Chappelle's Show on Comedy Central. Following that, Carbonaro played Andy Wilson in the 2006 comedy Another Gay Movie. For his work, he won the Outfest "Best Actor in a Feature Film" award. Carbonaro has also appeared on All My Children (2006), The Guiding Light (2006), and Law & Order: Special Victims Unit (2007).

In 2022, he performed at the Penn & Teller Theater in Las Vegas while they performed in Australia, then later in the year filled in for Teller while he was recovering from surgery.

== Personal life ==
Carbonaro is gay. He has been married to actor Peter Stickles since 2014.

== Filmography ==
=== Film ===
Year	Title	Role	Notes
2000	The Empath	Young doctor #2	
2003	A Tale of Two Pizzas	Mikey Falcone	
2006	Another Gay Movie	Andy Wilson	
2007	I Was a Creature from Outer Space	Jim	short
2011	God Bless America	Robbie Barkley	
2013	The Trouble with Barry	Nolan	

=== Television ===
Year	Title	Role	Notes
2004	Chappelle's Show	WacArnold's Manager	Episode #2.2
2006	All My Children	Drunken Groom	2 episodes
2006	Guiding Light	Magician / Rookie Cop	5 episodes
2007	Law & Order: Special Victims Unit	Jeff Trapido	Episode: Philadelphia
2009	30 Rock	Waiter	Episode: St. Valentine's Day
2010	CSI: Miami	Gabe Calligan	Episode: Reality Kids
2010	How to Make It in America	Marco	Pilot episode
2011	Wizards of Waverly Place	Zelzar, The Robot	2 episodes
2012	Grey's Anatomy	Dominic Zicaro	Episode: Have You Seen Me Lately?
2012	iCarly	Jim	Episode: iFind Spencer Friends
2012	The Newsroom	Manny	2 episodes
2003–14	Tonight Show with Jay Leno	Magic Clerk	
2014–2020	The Carbonaro Effect	Himself	68 episodes
2023	American Born Chinese (TV series)	"Bozo McDingdong"	Episode: A Monkey on a Quest
