= True Crime (Sony Pictures Television) =

British free-to-air television channel

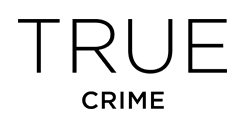
- Country: United Kingdom
- Broadcast area: United Kingdom; Ireland

Programming
- Timeshift service: True Crime +1

Ownership
- Owner: Sony Pictures Television

History
- Launched: 22 March 2016; 10 years ago (original); 12 February 2019; 7 years ago (relaunch)
- Replaced: More Than Movies (original)
- Closed: 15 November 2018; 7 years ago (as Sony Crime Channel 2); 1 July 2019; 6 years ago (relaunch)
- Former names: Sony Crime Channel 2 (2018)

True Crime was a British free-to-air television channel owned by Sony Pictures Television that originally launched on 22 March 2016, it was renamed as Sony Crime Channel 2 on 6 February 2018. The channel abruptly closed on 15 November 2018, along with sister channel Scuzz.

True Crime was relaunched on 12 February 2019, replacing TruTV, but then abruptly shut down again on 1 July 2019.

The +1 simulcast was removed from Sky on 27 June 2017 to make room for TruTV +1.

== Logo history ==
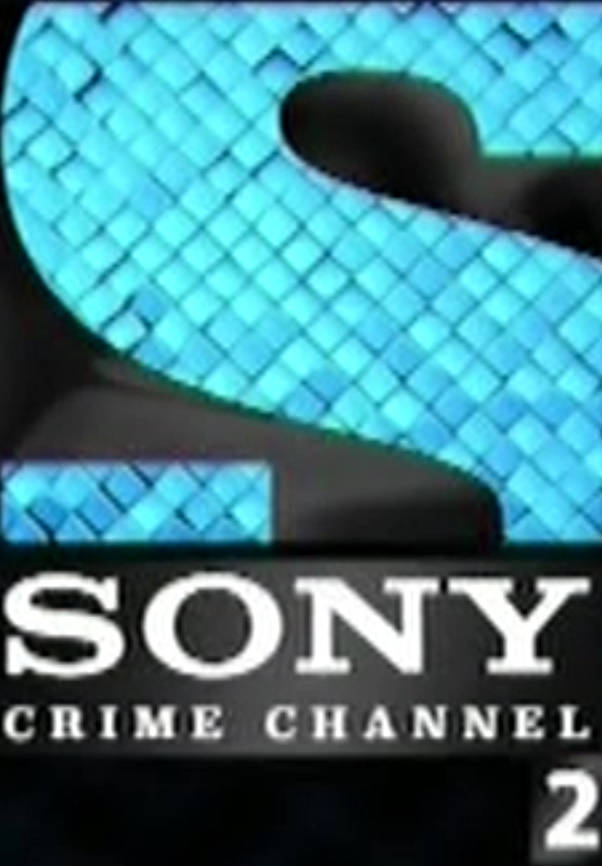
Logo as Sony Crime Channel 2, 2018
