= Tiger Team (TV series) =

2007 American television show

Tiger Team is a 2007 American television show on Court TV, that was aired as a burn-off pilot on the evening of December 25, 2007, days before the network converted to the new branding of truTV.

The show follows a civilian tiger team composed of Chris Nickerson, Luke McOmie, and Ryan Jones, members of Alternative Technology, an Information Security company from Colorado, which is hired to infiltrate organizations with the objective of testing their weaknesses to electronic, psychological, tactical, and physical threats. Attacks executed on organizations in this television show include social engineering, wired and wireless hacking, and physical breaking and entering

Tiger Team's two produced episodes aired on Christmas Night 2007 at 11:00 pm ET, a time when original new television programming usually never premieres, much less non-holiday programming. Although some viewers were interested in more episodes of the show, the network emailed those who inquired to say it was only a 'special', and there would be no consideration under truTV's new programming direction to make it a continuing series.

== Episodes ==
- Episode 1: "The Car Dealership Takedown" – The Tiger Team tests the security of Symbolic Motors, an exotic car dealership in La Jolla, California. The Tiger Team uses two distinct social engineering attacks, one rogue wireless access point attack, and a complex physical attack to gain unabated access to sensitive customer information and the showroom floor's multi-million-dollar vehicle inventory.
- Episode 2: "24 Karat Caper". The Tiger Team tests the security of Jason of Beverly Hills, a high-end custom jeweler in Beverly Hills. In this episode, the Tiger Team employ social engineering, RFID cloning, a complex physical attack, and safe-cracking to gain access to the jeweler's millions of dollars' worth of precious gems and sensitive customer information.

== Reception ==
The first episode was described as an "excellent example " of the issue posed by persons "posing as a vendor [to] compromise [a] target company".
