= Brooke Van Poppelen =

American comedian, actress, and writer (born 1978)

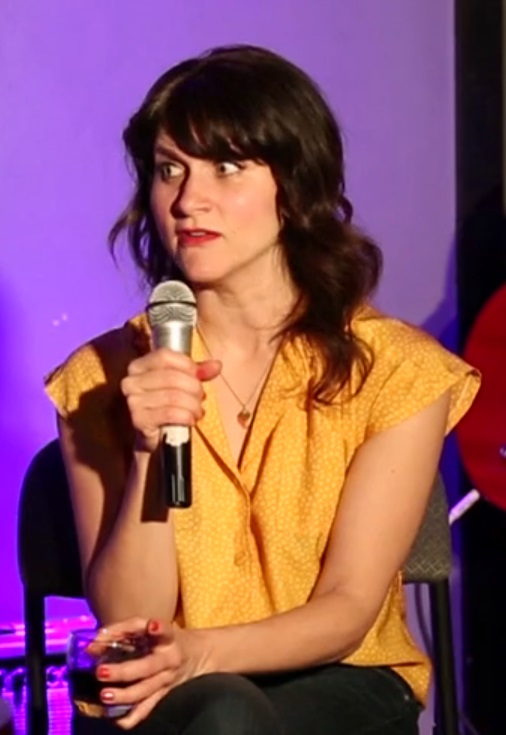
- Brooke Van Poppelen on Dale Radio in 2014
- Born: 1978 (age 46–47); Rochester, Michigan
- Occupation(s): Comedian, actress, writer
- Years active: 2012–present
- Television: Hack My Life
- Website: www.brookevanpoppelen.com

Brooke Van Poppelen (born 1978) is an American comedian, actress, and writer. She co-hosted the truTV series Hack My Life. Van Poppelen is from Detroit, Michigan. Prior to working in New York City and Los Angeles, she performed and trained in Chicago.

== Discography ==
=== Comedy albums ===
- Hard Feelings (2016)
