= Way to Go (TV series) =

British TV sitcom (BBC Three, 2013)

- Genre: Sitcom
- Created by: Bob Kushell
- Starring: Blake Harrison; Marc Wootton; Ben Heathcote; Laura Aikman; Sinead Matthews
- Country of origin: United Kingdom
- Original language: English
- No. of series: 1
- No. of episodes: 6

Production
- Executive producer: Jon Plowman
- Producer: Justin Davies
- Running time: 30 minutes

Original release
- Network: BBC Three
- Release: 17 January – 21 February 2013

Way to Go is a British television sitcom created by American television writer and producer Bob Kushell. It centers on three men who started an assisted suicide business. The series premiered on BBC Three on 17 January 2013. In July 2013, BBC Three announced the show's cancellation after one series and six 30-minute episodes.

== Characters ==
- Blake Harrison as Scott, a receptionist at a veterinary clinic who dropped out of medical school when he could not afford to pay for it. As the moral central of the show, Scott constantly struggles with the implications of the business of death, and how it opens up life opportunities for him and his friends.
- Ben Heathcote as Joey, Scott's womanizing, wise-cracking half-brother with a gambling addiction.
- Marc Wootton as Cozzo, Scott's waggish pal who works as a fast-food machine repair technician.
- Laura Aikman as Julia, the daughter of Paddy the first client of the assisted suicide business. She ends up becoming Scott's girlfriend.
- Sinead Matthews as Debbie, Cozzo's extraordinarily tolerant, newly pregnant wife, who also happens to be a police officer.
- Hannah Job as Lucie, Scott's attractive but somewhat vapid ex-girlfriend.
- Melanie Jessop as Dr Jill, Scott's machiavellian, sexually harassing boss. She is the veterinarian at the pet clinic.

== Episodes ==
No.	Title	Directed by	Written by	Original release date
1	"The Beginning of the End"	Catherine Morshead	Bob Kushell	17 January 2013
Scott, fresh off being dumped by his girlfriend, helps prevent his brother Joey from being killed by money-lenders by reluctantly agreeing to an offer to assist the terminally ill man across the hall with his suicide. Scott employs his friend Cozzo to help build the machine that will do it. But Cozzo, whose prying wife Debbie is a police officer, decides that if he's going to take the risk, they should turn assisted-suicide into a business.
2	"The Business End of Things"	Catherine Morshead	Bob Kushell	24 January 2013
When the guys' second client deems their assisted-suicide operation amateurish, Scott drags his bumbling group to a business seminar, where things get even more unprofessional. Joey, meanwhile, still owes money to his lender and, as punishment, has to sadistically punish someone else.
3	"The Be-All and End-All"	Catherine Morshead	Bob Kushell	31 January 2013
Scott dances on the edge when he falls for Julia – who is his first client, Paddy's, beautiful daughter. Julia's on a search for Paddy's valuable George Best football boots, the very thing her father gave Scott as payment for assisting him with his suicide. Will Scott keep her from discovering his illegal business? Joey romances a Goth girl on the floor of a chicken restaurant, and Cozzo's wife Debbie becomes suspicious after finding his hidden stash of money. Meanwhile, the three friends make a dirty old man's final wish come true.
4	"The Bitter End"	Catherine Morshead	Russell Arch	7 February 2013
When Scott's troubles in the bedroom are exacerabated by his sexual harassment at work, he plans a special night for Julia. Joey falls off the gambling wagon and Cozzo has to pretend he's Jewish in order to satisfy a client's dying needs.
5	"Dead End"	Catherine Morshead	Brian Dooley	14 February 2013
Scott and Cozzo force Joey to go to a gambling addicts group, only to have it backfire on their business. Cozzo decides to get healthy for his baby. Scott, in a desperate move to get Julia back, claims he's struggling with an addiction of his own: sex.
6	"The End of the Beginning"	Jeff Greenstein	Jeff Greenstein	21 February 2013
After Julia breaks up with Scott, he decides to get away and suggests the guys splurge on a corporate retreat at a beautiful hotel in the country. While there, Cozzo faces his body issues, Scott hooks up with his ex-girlfriend and Joey meets his childhood hero, an 80s TV star (Warren Clarke) who asks Joey to help him die.

== Music ==
The show's theme tune, "Superstar Luck Machine", was composed by Ian Masterson.

== Controversy ==
A week and a half before the show began airing, Tory MP, Mark Pritchard, publicly criticized the BBC for commissioning the program and turning the subject of assisted dying into "a matter of fun".
