= The Muppets (TV series) =

American sitcom

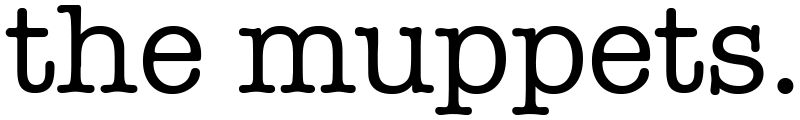
- Genre: Sitcom; Mockumentary; Slice of life; Puppetry
- Based on: Characters by Jim Henson
- Developed by: Bill Prady; Bob Kushell
- Showrunners: Bob Kushell (episodes 1–10); Kristin Newman (episodes 11–16)
- Directed by: Randall Einhorn; Matt Sohn
- Starring: Steve Whitmire; Eric Jacobson; Dave Goelz; Bill Barretta; David Rudman; Matt Vogel; Peter Linz
- Opening theme: "Opening Theme" by Dave Thomas Jr. (includes "The Muppet Show Theme" by Jim Henson and Sam Pottle)
- Composers: Ed Mitchell; Steve Morrell
- Country of origin: United States
- Original language: English
- No. of seasons: 1
- No. of episodes: 16

Production
- Executive producers: Bill Prady; Bob Kushell; Kristin Newman; Randall Einhorn; Bill Barretta; Kyle Laughlin; Debbie McClellan
- Producers: Margee Magee; Angeli Millan; Kris Eber; Emily Wilson
- Running time: 22 minutes
- Production companies: Bill Prady Productions; The Muppets Studio; ABC Studios

Original release
- Network: ABC
- Release: September 22, 2015 – March 1, 2016

The Muppets (stylized as the muppets.) is an American sitcom that originally aired on ABC from September 22, 2015, to March 1, 2016. Co-created by Bill Prady and Bob Kushell, the series was produced by ABC Studios and the Muppets Studio, with Randall Einhorn and Muppet performer Bill Barretta serving as executive producers alongside Prady and Kushell. On May 12, 2016, ABC cancelled the series after one season.

This was the first Muppets production to be produced by ABC Studios (later ABC Signature).

The series is set in Los Angeles and depicts the everyday personal and professional lives of the Muppets during production of Up Late with Miss Piggy, a fictional late-night talk show starring Miss Piggy. The Muppets serves as a parody of other mockumentary-style series, such as The Office, Modern Family, and Parks and Recreation by employing the same single-camera setup filming style with the implication of a documentary crew filming everyone. The series stars Muppet performers Steve Whitmire, Eric Jacobson, Dave Goelz, Bill Barretta, David Rudman, Matt Vogel, and Peter Linz in multiple roles.

== Background ==
The series marks the characters' first ongoing prime-time network television series since Muppets Tonight (1996–1998). The Muppets was picked up by ABC, the same network that aired Muppets Tonight—as the characters, the network, and the production companies are all owned by The Walt Disney Company—on the ABC network schedule.

This marks the second time Bill Prady worked on a revival of the Muppets. Before co-creating CBS' The Big Bang Theory (2007–2019), the writer-producer had previously shot test footage on which ABC ultimately passed. Prady's history with the Muppets dates back to his work on Fraggle Rock: The Animated Series in 1987. His previous writing credits for Muppet productions include the Muppet*Vision 3D attraction at Disney's Hollywood Studios, and the tribute special The Muppets Celebrate Jim Henson, which earned Prady an Emmy Award nomination in 1991.

Executive producer Bob Kushell explained the intention behind the series; "We have the opportunity to explore these characters as individuals with their own emotional lives that are separate from each other and aren't shadowed by each other's presence, as I think they have been for the last 20 years... it's not just a behind-the-scenes look at a show, but it's the relationship-driven, emotional stories that people go through in their personal lives. Everyone in this version of the Muppets wants to push them further in a way they've never been before." Kushell added, "Rightfully or wrongfully, The Muppets became more of a kids' product over the years. We want to bring them all the way back to what they were intended to be and then some. But never so much that anyone has to explain anything uncomfortable to their kids."

== Cast and characters ==
=== Main cast ===
- Steve Whitmire as:
  - Kermit the Frog, the show's executive producer and Denise's boyfriend.
  - Rizzo the Rat, one of Gonzo's staff writers.
  - Beaker, Bunsen's frazzled assistant.
  - Statler, a heckler and audience member of Up Late with Miss Piggy.
  - Lips, the trumpet player of the Electric Mayhem, the show's house band.
  - The Muppet Newsman, a local news presenter who operates in a nearby studio.
  - Foo-Foo, Miss Piggy's pet Bichon Frise.
  - Link Hogthrob
- Eric Jacobson as:
  - Miss Piggy, the eponymous host of Up Late with Miss Piggy and Kermit's former significant other.
  - Fozzie Bear, a struggling comedian and Piggy's on-air announcer, sidekick and warm-up comic.
  - Animal, the crazed drummer of The Electric Mayhem.
  - Sam the Eagle, the head executive of broadcast standards and practices for ABC.
  - Marvin Suggs
- Dave Goelz as:
  - Gonzo the Great, the head writer of the show.
  - Dr. Bunsen Honeydew, a freelance scientist in charge of the show's special effects and the prop department.
  - Waldorf, a heckler and audience member of Up Late with Miss Piggy.
  - Zoot, the reserved saxophone player of The Electric Mayhem.
  - Chip, an IT technician.
  - Beauregard, the studio janitor.
- Bill Barretta as:
  - Pepe the King Prawn, one of Gonzo's staff writers.
  - Rowlf the Dog, the owner of Rowlf's Tavern, a night bar across the street from the studio.
  - Bobo the Bear, the show's stage manager.
  - Dr. Teeth, keyboard player and lead vocalist of The Electric Mayhem.
  - The Swedish Chef, a chef who is in charge of the show's craft services.
  - Big Mean Carl, the receptionist for Up Late with Miss Piggy.
  - Bubba the Rat
  - Howard Tubman
- David Rudman as:
  - Scooter, the show's talent coordinator and associate producer.
  - Janice, the lead guitar player of The Electric Mayhem.
- Matt Vogel as:
  - Uncle Deadly, Miss Piggy's wardrobe supervisor.
  - Floyd Pepper, the bass player for The Electric Mayhem.
  - Sweetums, the show's cue card operator.
  - Lew Zealand
  - Crazy Harry
  - Camilla the Chicken, Gonzo's reunited girlfriend
  - Robin the Frog, Kermit's nephew.
  - Pops
- Peter Linz as:
  - Walter, a fan of the Muppets who appears in the First Look Presentation.
  - Gloria Estefan, a Magellanic penguin chick. He was adopted by Miss Piggy during her trip to Argentina and quickly forms a bond with Uncle Deadly.

=== Recurring cast ===
- Julianne Buescher as:
  - Denise, a pig who works as a network marketer and is Kermit's girlfriend.
  - Yolanda Rat, Kermit's assistant who is good friends with Rizzo.
  - Debbie, Gonzo's online girlfriend
- Riki Lindhome as Becky, Fozzie's human girlfriend. She was previously played by Margo Harshman in the First Look Presentation.
- Layla Alizada as Betty, the Hair and Makeup Specialist at Up Late with Miss Piggy.
- Nilla Watkins as Kim, the production assistant at Up Late with Miss Piggy.
- June Diane Raphael as Lucy Royce, the president of ABC.
- Utkarsh Ambudkar as Pizza (pronounced "Pache"), a "branding guru" who is appointed by the network to re-brand Up Late with Miss Piggy. He previously branded Keegan-Michael Key, Jordan Peele, Katy Perry, some warlord, and others. He is constantly trying to get the Muppets to do what he wants for the show, and will go as far as to sabotage them if they do not. In episode 15, however, Sweetums, Rizzo, Pepe, and a few others reform him.

== Episodes ==
No.	Title	Directed by	Written by	Original release date ^{[b]}	US viewers (millions)
0	First Look Presentation	Randall Einhorn	Bill Prady & Bob Kushell	July 21, 2015	--
The Muppets find out ABC is interested in filming a documentary series about them but Miss Piggy is not on board, forcing Kermit to break the bad news that the show will not air. Meanwhile, Fozzie has to meet his girlfriend Becky's parents, who do not approve of her dating a bear. Note: The 10-minute episode was shown at the ABC upfront at San Diego Comic-Con in July 2015. It was posted on YouTube ten days later, but removed from YouTube once the series premiered. Guest stars: Topher Grace as himself, Elizabeth Banks as herself, Margo Harshman as Becky, Jere Burns as Carl, Meagen Fay as Holly
1	"Pig Girls Don't Cry (Pilot)"	Randall Einhorn	Bill Prady & Bob Kushell	September 22, 2015	9.01
The Muppets tackle some of the show's ongoing issues and try to find guest stars that Miss Piggy approves of since she does not want Elizabeth Banks. Fozzie tries to get Becky's parents to approve of him even though he is a bear. Imagine Dragons perform their song "Roots". Guest stars: Elizabeth Banks as herself, Tracy Anderson as herself, Tom Bergeron as himself, Imagine Dragons as themselves, Riki Lindhome as Becky, Meagen Fay as Holly, Jere Burns as Carl
2	"Hostile Makeover"	Randall Einhorn	Story by : Bill Prady & Bob Kushell; Teleplay by : Dave Caplan & Gregg Mettler	September 29, 2015	5.78
Hoping to make her feel good, Kermit sets Miss Piggy up with Josh Groban only to find Josh has his own ideas for the show. Bobo the Bear attempts to sell cookies for his daughter. Fozzie is invited to a party at Jay Leno's house and is tempted to obtain a souvenir of the party, where he ends up taking (and accidentally breaking) a candy bowl that was previously owned by George Carlin. Guest stars: Josh Groban as himself, Laurence Fishburne as himself, Jay Leno as himself, Lea Thompson as herself, Reza Aslan as himself
3	"Bear Left Then Bear Write"	Randall Einhorn	Story by : Dave Caplan & Gregg Mettler; Teleplay by : Nell Scovell & Steve Rudnick	October 6, 2015	4.85
Trying to spare Fozzie's feelings after he writes a terrible sketch for the show, Kermit inadvertently convinces him to quit and pursue a career as a screenwriter. Miss Piggy is furious when Christina Applegate plays a prank on her on-air and plans to prank her back with Scooter's help. Gonzo uses Liam Hemsworth's picture on a dating website, leading to problems when his online girlfriend Debbie wants to meet him in person. Guest stars: Christina Applegate as herself, Nick Offerman as himself, Liam Hemsworth as himself, Chris Jai Alex as Police Officer
4	"Pig Out"	Randall Einhorn	Story by : Bob Kushell & Dave Caplan; Teleplay by : Gregg Mettler & Nell Scovell	October 13, 2015	4.34
Miss Piggy finds out that the crew meet at Rowlf's Tavern at the end of taping and gets herself invited where they perform karaoke with Ed Helms. Meanwhile, Statler is hospitalized after being accidentally shot with a T-shirt gun by Fozzie, who goes to great lengths to make amends. At the same time, Sam mistakenly thinks that Janice is attracted to him. Guest star: Ed Helms as himself
5	"Walk the Swine"	Randall Einhorn	Story by : Dave Caplan & Steve Rudnick; Teleplay by : Gregg Mettler & Nell Scovell	October 27, 2015	4.33
Miss Piggy's feud with Reese Witherspoon (who previously beat her out for the lead female role in Walk the Line) hits a new level when they both volunteer for Habitat for Humanity. Meanwhile, Fozzie's relationship with Becky is in turmoil when he starts telling jokes about her in his stand-up set. Also, Rizzo causes car trouble for Scooter by accidentally crashing into him. Guest stars: Reese Witherspoon as herself, Riki Lindhome as Becky
6	"The Ex-Factor"	Randall Einhorn	Story by : Bob Kushell & Steve Rudnick; Teleplay by : Nell Scovell & Emily Wilson	November 3, 2015	4.56
Kermit asks for Miss Piggy's advice on what to get Denise for her birthday. Meanwhile, after appearing on Up Late with Miss Piggy, Kristin Chenoweth agrees to perform a gig at the anniversary of Floyd Pepper's parents and causes an argument between The Electric Mayhem members. Guest stars: Kristin Chenoweth as herself, Stacey Moseley as Cheryl
7	"Pig's in a Blackout"	Matt Sohn	Steve Rudnick & Emily Wilson	November 10, 2015	3.94
Following some incidents at the studio and the fact that Patrick Dempsey cancelled upon contracting poison ivy, Kermit is advised by Miss Piggy and Denise to go to a local spa. Once there, Kermit has a hard time relaxing when he encounters Jason Bateman, who harasses him by asking for his help with his daughter's school play. Scooter fills in for Kermit, which leads to some unfortunate circumstances like the air conditioner breaking and the resulting condensation causing the power to go out. Scooter considers giving up until Gonzo talks him out of it. At the same time, Sam tries to find common ground with Janice. Guest stars: Jason Bateman as himself, Pentatonix as themselves
8	"Too Hot to Handler"	Matt Sohn	Story by : Margee Magee & Angeli Millan; Teleplay by : Shane Kosakowski & Franklin Hardy	November 17, 2015	3.89
Scooter develops a crush on Chelsea Handler after she appears on the show. Meanwhile, Kermit and Denise go on a double date with Fozzie and Becky, where Kermit thinks Becky might be cheating at history trivia, which causes a fight between him and Fozzie. Guest stars: Chelsea Handler as herself, Riki Lindhome as Becky
9	"Going, Going, Gonzo"	Randall Einhorn	Story by : Shane Kosakowski & Franklin Hardy; Teleplay by : Jordan Reddout & Gus Hickey	December 1, 2015	3.78
Gonzo debates attempting a stunt from his past that he never completed, prompting Kermit to schedule it for the show. Despite a near-accident caused by Sweetums and Gonzo during her performance with Joseph Gordon-Levitt, Miss Piggy plans to promote her new product called Piggy Water. Meanwhile, Scooter attempts to change his image with the help of The Electric Mayhem. Dave Grohl later performs on the show as Gonzo's cannon shot stunt to the other roof is a success. During the credits, Grohl and Animal compete in a drum-off which ends in a draw. Guest stars: Joseph Gordon-Levitt as himself, Dave Grohl as himself
10	"Single All the Way"	Matt Sohn	Story by : Gregg Mettler & Nell Scovell; Teleplay by : Bob Kushell & Dave Caplan	December 8, 2015	3.81
The Muppets prepare a holiday special for the show with Mindy Kaling as Kermit and Scooter work to find an alternative to the musical number after hearing Kaling sing during rehearsal. After Becky breaks up with Fozzie, Miss Piggy gives him relationship advice and soon wonders if it is too late to rekindle her relationship with Kermit. Bitter that she was not in the Secret Santa drawing last year, Yolanda rigs the gift exchange. Sam hangs up a mistletoe in order to get Janice to kiss him. Guest stars: Mindy Kaling as herself, Echosmith as themselves
11	"Swine Song"	Randall Einhorn	Gregg Mettler & Emily Wilson	February 2, 2016	2.76
The crew returns from vacation, with Miss Piggy claiming to have gone through a spiritual change after returning from Argentina and adopting a Magellanic penguin chick that she names "Gloria Estefan", much to the chagrin of Uncle Deadly. The president of the network, Lucy Royce, visits the show and forces them to work with a consultant named Pizza to "update" the program. Keegan-Michael Key and Jordan Peele gravely warn Kermit and Miss Piggy about the repercussions of following the suggestions, noting that after working with Pizza and implementing his changes, Key & Peele was canceled. The Muppets instead tweak the show themselves, adding more skits involving the other Muppets to the show. Pizza visits the show during the night's taping and informs Kermit that he cancelled Key and Peele's scheduled appearance due to them pitching their oven mitts on Shark Tank. In order to save the show, Kermit performs "In Spite of Ourselves" with Miss Piggy, which makes Denise feel jealous. Afterwards at Rowlf's Tavern, she tells Kermit they should re-evaluate their relationship. Guest stars: Utkarsh Ambudkar as Pizza, June Diane Raphael as Lucy Royce, Keegan-Michael Key as himself, Jordan Peele as himself
12	"A Tail of Two Piggies"	Randall Einhorn	Nell Scovell & Steve Rudnick	February 9, 2016	2.71
After suffering a wardrobe malfunction where her tail hangs out at the premiere of Zootopia, Miss Piggy struggles with media attention. Meanwhile, Gonzo is distraught that Camilla the Chicken broke up with him and rents a house with Rizzo and Pepe that used to belong to Ian Ziering. Miss Piggy eventually decides to embrace who she is and plans to show her tail on the air. Lucy Royce and Sam advise Kermit to talk Miss Piggy into not going through with it, citing the loss of jobs and sponsors that will follow. Kermit goes on stage at the night's taping and says that although the network has banned Miss Piggy's scheduled stunt, he and the staff are permitted by default. They show off their own fake tails with Joan Jett performing. In the final scene at Gonzo, Rizzo and Pepe's house, a party is held with Ziering attending. Camilla suddenly appears, much to Gonzo's surprise. Guest stars: Ian Ziering as himself, June Diane Raphael as Lucy Royce, Joan Jett as herself
13	"Got Silk?"	Randall Einhorn	Shane Kosakowski & Franklin Hardy	February 16, 2016	2.45
Miss Piggy becomes depressed that because of the rebooted show, she is getting less screen time. In search of a friend, she goes with Janice to an aerial silk class. Meanwhile, Pizza attempts to brainwash Gonzo, Pepe, and Rizzo into getting a sketch idea on the night's taping. Kermit deals with not getting a response from Denise on the status of their relationship. Guest stars: Utkarsh Ambudkar as Pizza, Ingrid Michaelson as herself, RuPaul as himself, Kat Purgal as Gwynne, Jimm Giannini as Giuseppe
14	"Little Green Lie"	Bill Barretta	Dave Caplan & Jordan Reddout & Gus Hickey	February 23, 2016	2.60
When Kermit's nephew Robin comes to visit at the time when his parents are getting a divorce, Kermit struggles to keep his break-up with Miss Piggy a secret. Rizzo and Pepe also are struggling with Camilla's moving into the house and Gonzo's absence in their activities. To look for a new wingman, they put Sam, Big Mean Carl, and Chip through different tests at Rowlf's Tavern. Guest star: Lara Spencer as herself
15	"Generally Inhospitable"	Randall Einhorn	Margee Magee & Angeli Millan	March 1, 2016	2.73
After dislocating her leg during rehearsal, Miss Piggy is rushed into surgery while Pizza attempts to have a DJ guest host. Kermit arranges for Miss Piggy to host the night's taping from her hospital bed. Kermit even brings Rowlf along to work with Janice on a "Veterinarian's Hospital" skit with a nearby patient. Meanwhile, Rizzo, Pepe, Yolanda, Big Mean Carl, and Sweetums out how to deal with Pizza, eventually calling his father with whom he had an estranged relationship. With an offer to return home to run the family business, Pizza leaves the show. With the taping a success, Miss Piggy is brought into surgery, but not before she and Kermit exchange "I love you"'s; unbeknownst to them, the cameras are still rolling. Guest stars: Utkarsh Ambudkar as Pizza, Willie Nelson as himself, Phil LaMarr as Miss Piggy's doctor
16	"Because... Love"	Randall Einhorn	Scott Weinger & Emily Wilson	March 1, 2016	2.73
Kermit and Miss Piggy struggle with the aftermath of the previous night with Kermit realizing that he still loves her, but is anxious. Other Muppet characters have appeared at the studio after they saw the news as Howard Tubman hooks up some acts for Rizzo and Scooter to present on Up Late with Miss Piggy. Kermit flips a coin to decide at the suggestion of Rowlf. Miss Piggy believes that they are getting back together is all but confirmed. The staff try to help Kermit decide, with varying thoughts on the positives and negatives. After running into Jack White, Kermit makes a decision. After finding out about the coin flip, Miss Piggy is hurt and makes up her mind. At the taping, Jack White performs "You Are the Sunshine of My Life" and she runs off while the staff try to encourage her to reconsider on-air. Wanting to get away, Miss Piggy is on a plane to Thailand. Kermit arrives with a calzone and the two try to make a final decision, unaware that Pepe is secretly on the plane with them. Guest star: Jack White as himself

== Production ==
Bill Prady originated the idea to bring the Muppets back to prime-time television and enlisted Bob Kushell as co-creator and showrunner for the project, allowing Prady to concurrently continue performing his duties as executive producer on The Big Bang Theory, which CBS had renewed through its tenth season, for the 2016–17 season. Before ABC was approached, Netflix expressed interest in co-producing the series as part of its original programming roster.

The Muppets was considered a "stealth, late presentation" in the 2015 comedy development season. After buying Prady and Kushell's pitch, ABC ordered a pilot script and a 10-minute proof of concept filmed presentation, which was filmed at the Walt Disney Studios in May and delivered just in time for ABC schedule consideration. On May 7, 2015, ABC greenlit the series to order as an entry in the 2015–16 television season. The pitch presentation, which was first screened to the public on July 11, 2015, at Comic-Con to an overwhelmingly positive response, was released online on July 21, 2015. In regards to what Muppet characters to include, producers decided to omit extremely anthropomorphic characters such as "talking vegetables and dancing chickens".

The series was shot at Stages 6 and 7 of the Walt Disney Studios lot in Burbank, California, and on-location throughout Los Angeles. Sets must be raised four and a half feet so that the Muppet performers will have room to operate the characters, and all sets have platforms which can be moved. The Muppets received a full 16-episode season from ABC on October 29, 2015.

In early November 2015, it was announced that Kushell was leaving the series, with Kristen Newman in talks to replace him. The move was reportedly part of a creative overhaul of the series, which saw the final six episodes of the first season act as a relaunch of the show. Newman began work during production of the tenth episode, which involved her rewriting the Miss Piggy-Kermit scenes to "bring [their] connection back... that was being walked away from completely" in the early episodes. Newman also hoped to introduce more serialized elements to the series. However, ABC cancelled The Muppets on May 12, 2016 after one season.

After being dismissed from the Muppets performer troupe in 2016, Steve Whitmire talked to the media about how he provided notes on scripts for the series, saying that the longtime performers know the characters best. He cited the episode "Little Green Lie" as an example of how he felt the characters were being scripted wrong, noting:

I think that as Robin came to Kermit, he would say 'things happen, people go their separate ways, but that doesn't mean we don't care about you.' Kermit is too compassionate to lie to him to spare his feelings.

ABC cancelled the series in May 2016, "after a midseason show runner change failed to turn around disappointing ratings." Daniel Holloway from Variety added the series had "underperformed following a massive marketing campaign", and noted how "critics derided the series as not family-friendly enough and out of step with the history of the characters".

== Broadcast ==
The Muppets premiered on September 22, 2015 on ABC in the United States. It was broadcast on Sky 1 in the UK, starting Monday October 19, 2015. The series was also acquired by the Seven Network in Australia and premiered on December 29, 2015.

== Reception ==
=== Critical reception ===
On the review aggregate website Metacritic, The Muppets has a score of 62 out of 100, based on 31 reviews, indicating "generally favorable reviews". On Rotten Tomatoes, the series has a rating of 64%, based on 58 reviews, with an average rating of 6.46/10. The site's critical consensus reads: "The Muppets brings new energy to a beloved franchise—and although longtime fans may be taken aback by the show's adult mockumentary approach, the classic characters retain their essential spirit." The Washington Post's Hank Stuever complimented the series, calling it "a smart and often witty update to the Muppet brand," giving it a "B". Merrill Barr of Forbes wrote a negative review, stating, "By taking these creatures and turning them into 'real' people, the only way to make them funny becomes having them do outlandish things. The only problem is they're inherently outlandish just by existing, so everything they do just feels tame and lifeless by comparison." Dominic Patten of Deadline Hollywood negatively compared the series to Studio 60 on the Sunset Strip. Brian Lowry of Variety gave a more mixed reaction, calling it "something of a mixed bag", praising the humor, but criticizing the subplot of Fozzie dating a human woman. On the other hand, Dorothy Rabinowitz of The Wall Street Journal was more positive toward the series. She wrote, "As soon as you begin watching the new Muppets the question arises—how come no one thought of this before? So perfect is the idea of a late-night talk show called Up Late with Miss Piggy one has to wonder."

=== Criticism ===
The conservative group One Million Moms, an offshoot of the American Family Association, began protesting The Muppets, citing it as "unsuitable for family viewing", and calling for boycotts against it immediately after ABC picked it up, long before the series debuted. The Muppets later parodied One Million Moms' critique in their twelfth episode, "A Tail of Two Piggies", as the One Million Angry Parents Association represented by three protesters.

The Parents Television Council also criticized the series for not meeting "family viewing" guidelines and suggested a boycott, based on the mockumentary format of the series including mentions of plastic surgery, "inside" business language being used in a crude manner, and the Muppets in a bar consuming alcoholic beverages.

=== Accolades ===
Award	Category	Recipients	Result
Kids' Choice Awards	Favorite Family TV Show		Won
Primetime Emmy Award	Outstanding Art Direction for a Contemporary Program (Half Hour or Less)	Denise Ann Pizzini, Production Designer; Don Diers, Set Decorator	Nominated

=== Ratings ===
No.	Title	Air date	Rating/share (18–49)	Viewers (millions)	DVR (18–49)	DVR viewers (millions)	Total (18–49)	Total viewers (millions)
1	"Pig Girls Don't Cry (Pilot)"	September 22, 2015	2.9/10	9.01	1.1	2.68	4.0	11.69
2	"Hostile Makeover"	September 29, 2015	2.0/7	5.78	0.9	—N/a	2.9	—N/a
3	"Bear Left Then Bear Write"	October 6, 2015	1.7/6	4.85	—N/a	—N/a	—N/a	—N/a
4	"Pig Out"	October 13, 2015	1.3/5	4.34	0.8	—N/a	2.1	—N/a
5	"Walk the Swine"	October 27, 2015	1.4/5	4.33	0.8	—N/a	2.2	—N/a
6	"The Ex-Factor"	November 3, 2015	1.4/5	4.56	TBA	TBA	TBA	TBA
7	"Pig's in a Blackout"	November 10, 2015	1.2/4	3.94	TBA	TBA	TBA	TBA
8	"Too Hot to Handler"	November 17, 2015	1.2/4	3.89	TBA	TBA	TBA	TBA
9	"Going, Going, Gonzo"	December 1, 2015	1.1/4	3.78	0.6	—N/a	1.7	—N/a
10	"Single All the Way"	December 8, 2015	1.1/4	3.81	TBA	TBA	TBA	TBA
11	"Swine Song"	February 2, 2016	0.9/3	2.76	TBA	TBA	TBA	TBA
12	"A Tale of Two Piggies"	February 9, 2016	0.8/3	2.71	TBA	TBA	TBA	TBA
13	"Got Silk?"	February 16, 2016	0.8/3	2.45	TBA	TBA	TBA	TBA
14	"Little Green Lie"	February 23, 2016	0.8/3	2.60	TBA	TBA	TBA	TBA
15	"Generally Inhospitable"	March 1, 2016	0.9/3	2.73	TBA	TBA	TBA	TBA
16	"Because... Love"	March 1, 2016	0.9/3	2.73	TBA	TBA	TBA	TBA

== Notes ==
^{a} This number represents the number of views the First Look Presentation received on YouTube (as of September 19, 2015) since ABC officially released it on July 21, 2015.
^{b} Episodes premiere one day earlier on City in Canada.
