= Russell Arch =

American director, writer and animator

Russell Richard Arch is an American director, writer and animator who lives in Los Angeles, USA.

He has worked extensively in hidden camera, and is currently the executive producer and showrunner of TruTV's The Carbonaro Effect, having worked on the show since its pilot episode. In addition, he wrote and directed on both seasons of NBC's Betty White's Off Their Rockers.

He is also an editor, having cut segments for most shows he's worked on. In 2013, he edited segments, and created the initial episode, of Howie Mandel's TBS hidden-camera prank series Deal with It.

In 2012, he broke episode stories for the BBC3 black comedy Way To Go, and wrote episode #4.

He co-created, wrote, edited and directed all 26 episodes of Anytime with Bob Kushell, a five-minute talk show (produced for Sony Pictures Television) that also shot in Arch's garage-studio.

He created The Toodles, a scripted comedy about a rock band turned "Wiggles" type band and sold it to VH-1. Arch created The Pat Kilbane Show out of his home office, and eventually sold the project to Comedy Central. He also co-created the pilot "Harsh Reality" with Kevin Healey and Scott Hallock (Scare Tactics).

His animations have been seen on MTV, VH-1, CBS, Fox, and even won him a Promax Award for his FOX "Little J.T." Christmas campaign.

He has also directed numerous promotional campaigns for TV Networks. These include greenscreen segments with Dan Whitney Larry the Cable Guy in a series of promos for Blue Collar TV, in which Larry was "cut into" existing scenes from One Tree Hill, Smallville, and Gilmore Girls.

He is married to actress Lisa Arch, with whom he has a son, Garrett Mitchell Arch, who was born on September 18, 2007.
