= Hack My Life =

- Also known as: Hack My Life: Inside Hacks
- Genre: How-to; DIY; Comedy
- Presented by: Kevin Pereira; Brooke Van Poppelen
- Country of origin: United States
- Original language: English
- No. of seasons: 4
- No. of episodes: 62

Production
- Executive producers: Todd Lichten; Matt Sharp; Dan Adler; Brian Saracusa; Ashley Singer
- Camera setup: Multi-camera
- Running time: 22 minutes
- Production companies: Truly Original; Sharp Entertainment

Original release
- Network: truTV
- Release: January 6, 2015 – September 11, 2018

Hack My Life is an American how-to series that premiered on truTV on January 6, 2015.

The cable network teamed up with micro-blogging site Tumblr and phone service MetroPCS to create this show, and it invited its viewers to share their life-hacks to be considered for airing. The first season wrapped up on March 24, 2015. The second season premiered on August 18, 2015. The third season premiered on March 29, 2016.

== Synopsis ==
Hosts Kevin Pereira (formerly of G4TV's Attack of the Show!) and Brooke Van Poppelen explore and demonstrate life hacks that can be time and money-saving. Examples included are using a bag of potato chips as a substitute for charcoal in a BBQ pit, or building your own portable air-conditioning unit using a Styrofoam cooler, ice cubes, and a battery-operated fan.

At the end of each first-season episode, the hosts highlight which hacks are the best time saver, biggest money saver, least likely to succeed, and the hack of the week. For the second-season episode endings, Kevin and Brooke test out solutions posted on their Tumblr page.

An enhanced version of the series is titled as Hack My Life: Inside Hacks, which features on-screen commentary from the cast and crew, and has premiered April 25, 2017.

== Recurring Segments ==
- Hack or Wack? - Kevin and Brooke test hacks found on the internet and determine whether the shortcut is "hack" or "wack". In some episodes, the public is invited on set to give their own opinions.
- Hack vs. Hack - The hosts test both hacks to determine which is more effective. Several individuals are invited to try them out.
- Hack Quickie - The animated interstitial segments show quick effective hacks. Examples given: Using an empty tissue box as a plastic bag dispenser, or painting nail polish on multiple keys to color-code them.
- Hack All-Star - An ordinary household item is featured each week with many more uses of them. The segment is sometimes changed to sports-themed Hack MVP.
- Hack Your <subject> - Throughout season 1, Kevin and Brooke showcase a series of shortcuts to help viewers hack their party, housework, etc.
- Now What? - Brooke gives different scenarios and asks "Now what?" in a "Six degrees of separation" kind of hacks.
- Hack Line of Defense - Throughout season 1, a series of hacks are provided to defend a person from their "antagonist".
- The Lazy Cook - Brooke showcases hack recipes that take little or no effort to make.
- Let's Make A Thing - Kevin gives instructions on how to turn ordinary items into a useful hack.
- Reen-Hackment - In this segment throughout season 1, it's a slacker vs. hacker showdown, in the season 4 that segment is renamed as Hacker vs Slacker.
- Hacksperiment - Kevin and Brooke test wacky experimental hacks.
- Breaking Down the Hacks - Kevin narrates why the hacks are effective or otherwise.
- Undercover Hack - Throughout season 1, Kevin and Brooke set up hidden cameras at a random establishment, and invites the public to try out the hacks without any instructions. Those that have completed the task get the items for free.
- Hacks Del Corazón - (Translated in English as "Hacks from the Heart") A sketch segment in the style of a telenovela where characters would find hacks to solve every lovers' quarrel.
- Hack Masters - Throughout season 2, Kevin interviews people that have been using hacks for years and invites them to demonstrate on set.
- Hack Hero - Starting in season 2, a "Hack Hero" is featured each week. With every situation they encounter, they improvise a hack. For one episode where the subject is in jail, it's retitled as Hack Super Villain.
- Hacks from History - Starting in season 2, a narrator gives information about how everyday inventions (examples: the ice cream cone, the wheel) were hacks in the past.
- Tumblr's Hack Mail - Starting in season 2, Kevin and Brooke try out three fan-submitted hacks to a problem they ask on Tumblr. Their favorite gets a Hack Seal of Approval.
- Broke Ass Bob's Guide - Starting in season 3, it's a segment where Bob shows viewers financial-savvy tricks on a subject such as dating or owning a pet.
- Gaming The System - Starting in season 3, Kevin and Brooke try various loopholes such as ways to get discounted or free items (meals, groceries, etc.) or to test the efficiency of a home security system.
- Dr. Hack - A sketch segment in the style of a medical drama where the title character uses hacks instead of medicines and hospital equipment as remedies to cure every day illnesses.
- Spot The Hack - Two alike products are put to the test at a place of business and customers are invited to determine which is the hack product. The former name for this segment was Can You Hack It?.
- Hack My House - Starting in season 3, it's a home improvement-style kind of segment.
- Hack Pop Quiz - Brooke asks people what everyday object can help in various situations, like trying to get a ring off or cutting rope without a knife.
- Hacking The Norm - Brooke and Kevin test whether hacks are more effective than the normal method, like using dental floss instead of a knife to cut cake.
- Hack Off Challenge - This segment is just like "Hack vs. Hack", except with 3 hacks.
- Worldwide Hacks - Starting in season 3, Kevin & Brooke showcase outrageous hacks featured in viral videos and interviews the subjects about said hacks.
- The Lazy Trainer - Starting in season 4, Brooke demonstrates exercising techniques that take little to no effort.
- Hack 911 - A sketch segment where two police officers go to people's houses when they have a problem and solve it with hacks.
- Re-Hack - Starting in season 4, hacks that have failed (like the bike mower) would be given revamps to see if there's any improvement made.
- Hack Delivery - Kevin and Brooke test out products from infomercials that were hacks (example: the Illumibowl that lights up the inside of a toilet bowl) and determine if they keep or send back.
- Hacked or Fiction - Starting in season 5, Kevin and Brooke test out hacks from TV shows and movies to see if they really stack up to real-life scenarios.
- Hack It To The Limit - Kevin and Brooke devise a protective hack for easily broken items (such as a cellphone), and they test it until it fails, or in some rare cases, not fail at all.
- The More You Hack - A segment, spoofing NBC's The More You Know PSAs that show little-known hacks—such as unfolding a Chinese take-out carton to a plate.
