= Branson Famous =

- Also known as: Finally Famous
- Genre: Reality; Musical
- Starring: Brandon Mabe; Breanna Mabe; Brent Mabe; Denton Mabe; Heather Gentry; Katie Mabe; Megan McCombs; Patty Mabe; Tim Mabe
- Narrated by: Brandon Mabe; Megan McCombs
- Opening theme: "Branson Famous"
- Country of origin: United States
- Original language: English
- No. of seasons: 1
- No. of episodes: 12

Production
- Production location: Branson, MO
- Camera setup: Multi-camera
- Running time: 22 minutes (excluding commercials)

Original release
- Network: truTV
- Release: December 29, 2014 – March 16, 2015

Branson Famous is an American reality series that premiered on truTV on December 29, 2014 as part of the network's latest programming revamp. It was billed as the first ever "reality musical" show.

== Synopsis ==
Branson Famous followed the Mabe Family, stars and owners of the Baldknobbers Jamboree show, the longest running show in Branson, Missouri, a city world-famous for its live entertainment shows.

The youngest of the Mabe siblings, Breanna, runs a gift shop, but wants to make her breakthrough into show business. And to add insult to injury, there's a "new sexy singer in town", Heather Gentry. In one of the more bizarre elements, the cast & crew break out in song during their confessionals.

Meanwhile, the Baldknobbers Jamboree is struggling in regards to finance, and the Mabe Family struggles to find a permanent solution to the issue. Some in the Mabe Family believe that this "sexy singer" will add life to the show, and possibly, allow them to make more money.

== Broadcast ==
The series debuted on TruTV in the United Kingdom and Ireland on April 9, 2015. As of May 2015 the series was not renewed for a second season. In May 2015, shortly after the series wasn't renewed, a petition was drawn up in effort to have the series renewed. The petition has since been discontinued. In September 2015, Brandon Mabe stated via Facebook when asked about a possible second season rumor that the family is "still looking for a network." As of January 2016 the show is confirmed as "permanently finished".
