= Crystina Poncher =

American sportscaster (born 1984)

Crystina Poncher (born July 20, 1984) is currently a commentator, host and reporter for Top Rank Boxing on ESPN. She previously served as host, reporter and correspondent for NFL Network and NFL.com.

== Career ==
In her role with Top Rank, she is currently the only female play-by-play broadcaster in boxing, and in 2019 became only the second women ever to call a major boxing event. Poncher currently calls the international broadcast for Top Rank and the undercards for ESPN+.

With the NFL, Poncher's duties included serving as an in-studio host for the NFL Network and as a reporter and correspondent for NFL.com's, NFL Fan Pass, giving inside access to all things NFL related.

Previously, Crystina worked as a reporter and host for Fox Sports West and Prime Ticket and as an in-studio host for FoxSports.com, contributing news updates as a part of the Fox Sports Flash. Additionally, she reported from the sidelines for college basketball on Fox Sports West and Prime Ticket.

== Personal life ==
Crystina graduated with honors from Long Beach State, with a bachelor's degree in Broadcast Journalism and minor in Communications.

Poncher is married and has two children. She currently resides in Los Angeles.
