= Illumibowl =

Battery-powered toilet night light

IllumiBowl is a motion-activated night light that fits on the rim of any toilet. It illuminates the inner bowl anytime that a person approaches the bathroom in the dark.

IllumiBowl was founded by Matt Alexander and Michael Kannely in Provo, Utah. They raised $95,970 in November 2014 to bring the product to market. IllumiBowl fulfilled its Kickstarter in August 2015.

On March 11, 2016, IllumiBowl was featured on ABC's television show Shark Tank. IllumiBowl successfully secured a deal with an investor Kevin O'Leary.
