= Anytime with Bob Kushell =

2008–2009 web series

Anytime with Bob Kushell was a five-minute talk show produced for Sony Pictures Television and their online streaming service Crackle. The show consists of a single monologue joke, a field-piece/desk bit, and a celebrity interview. It is hosted by Emmy-nominated writer Bob Kushell, who co-created the series with Russell Arch, who also directed all of the episodes. The show features a "house band" consisting of members from The Four Postmen, as well as writer Ron Rappaport.

Anytime with Bob Kushell was conceived after Kushell and Arch produced a popular video entitled The Strike, Your Marriage, and You and a behind-the-scenes "sequel" The Healing during the 2008 Writers Guild of America Strike.

Two "pilots" were produced in April 2008, and subsequently sold a 26 episode season that aired between December 2008 and June 2009.

The show was taped in Kushell's actual garage in Van Nuys, California.

== Episodes ==
=== Season 1 ===
Title	Original airdate	#
"Anytime with Bob Kushell feat. John Stamos"	December 18, 2008	1
Kushell interviews John Stamos and takes his 'son' Tommy to the beach.
"Anytime with Jennifer Esposito"	December 25, 2008	2
Kushell interviews Jennifer Esposito and shows his sex tape.
"Anytime with Bob Kushell feat. Neil Patrick Harris"	January 1, 2009	3
Kushell interviews Neil Patrick Harris and showcases "Dumb Dog Tricks".
"Anytime with Bob Kushell feat. Jeff Garlin"	January 8, 2009	4
Kushell interviews Jeff Garlin and the band deals with the flu.
"Anytime with Bob Kushell feat. Howie Mandel"	January 15, 2009	5
Kushell interviews Howie Mandel and gets 'punked'.
"Anytime with Bob Kushell feat. Christina Applegate"	January 22, 2009	6
Kushell interviews Christina Applegate and invites a boy from the Make a Wish Foundation.
"Anytime with Bob Kushell feat. Kat Von D"	January 29, 2009	7
Kushell interviews Kat Von D and takes care of a rat problem.
"Anytime with Bob Kushell feat. Zach Levi"	February 5, 2009	8
Kushell interviews Zach Levi and pays his mom a visit via video phone.
"Anytime with Bob Kushell feat. Rob Corddry"	February 12, 2009	9
Kushell interviews Rob Corddry and deals with some neighborhood cats.
"Anytime with Bob Kushell feat. John Lehr"	February 19, 2009	10
Kushell interviews John Lehr and hangs out with the "Spend a Day with Bob" winner.
"Anytime with Bob Kushell feat. Nicole Sullivan"	February 26, 2009	11
Kushell interviews Nicole Sullivan and finds trouble with a trap door.
"Anytime with Bob Kushell feat. Will Forte"	March 5, 2009	12
Kushell interviews Will Forte and learns some dangerous card tricks.
"Anytime with Bob Kushell feat. Jerry Springer"	March 12, 2009	13
Kushell interviews Jerry Springer and takes a trip back in time.

=== Season 2 ===
Title	Original airdate	#
"Anytime with Bob Kushell feat. Jon Cryer"	March 17, 2009	1
Kushell interviews Jon Cryer and invites a jazz musician to play with the band.
"Anytime with Bob Kushell feat. Jim Gaffigan"	March 24, 2009	2
Kushell interviews Jim Gaffigan and has to compete in the interview space.
"Anytime with Bob Kushell feat. Bryan Cranston"	March 31, 2009	3
Kushell interviews Bryan Cranston and has his 'son' Sammy help him with the yard work.
"Anytime with Bob Kushell feat. Jenna Elfman"	April 7, 2009	4
Kushell interviews Jenna Elfman and gets haunted.
"Anytime with Bob Kushell feat. Bob Saget"	April 14, 2009	5
Kushell interviews Bob Saget and his desk accessories share some secrets.
"Anytime with Bob Kushell feat. Patrick Warburton"	April 21, 2009	6
Kushell interviews Patrick Warburton and watches a stuntman perform a trick.
"Anytime with Bob Kushell feat. Tom Arnold"	April 28, 2009	7
Kushell interviews Tom Arnold and hires a mysterious bodyguard.
"Anytime with Bob Kushell feat. Greg Behrendt"	May 5, 2009	8
Kushell interviews Greg Behrendt and looks into a Crystal Ball.
"Anytime with Bob Kushell feat. Hank Azaria"	May 12, 2009	9
Kushell interviews Hank Azaria and a gay joke inspires a musical number.
"Anytime with Bob Kushell feat. Jerry O'Connell"	May 19, 2009	10
Kushell interviews Jerry O'Connell and Bob interviews a Zombie.
"Anytime with Bob Kushell feat. Alex Trebek"	May 26, 2009	11
Kushell interviews Alex Trebek and Bob discovers some secrets about the band.
"Anytime with Bob Kushell feat. Mary Lynn Rajskub"	June 2, 2009	12
Kushell interviews Mary Lynn Rajskub and Bob unveils his new iPhone App.
"Anytime with Bob Kushell feat. Nadine Velazquez"	June 9, 2009	13
Kushell interviews Nadine Velazquez and Bob travels to Iraq to entertain the troops.
