= Donald Piper (murderer) =

American murderer and suspected serial killer

- Born: Donald Arthur Piper; May 11, 1961 (age 65); West Des Moines, Iowa, U.S.
- Conviction: First degree murder (2 counts)
- Penalty: Life imprisonment

Details
- Victims: 2–6
- Span of crimes: 1993 – 1997 (confirmed)
- Country: United States
- State: Iowa
- Date apprehended: January 20, 2000
- Imprisoned at: Iowa State Penitentiary, Fort Madison, Iowa

Donald Arthur Piper (born May 11, 1961) is an American murderer and suspected serial killer convicted of killing two women in hotels around West Des Moines and Clive, Iowa in 1993 and 1997, but is considered a suspect in four other killings. For his confirmed crimes, Piper was convicted and sentenced to two life terms.

== Early life ==
Donald Arthur Piper was born on May 11, 1961, in West Des Moines, Iowa. Little is known of his personal background, except that he apparently suffered from frequent headaches as a teenager. In 1979, he started working as a maintenance engineer for a Hyatt hotel in Des Moines. In 1984, he was transferred to work in Denver, Colorado for two years before eventually returning to Des Moines, where he worked for several other hotels in the following years.

Piper had no criminal record up until 1993, when a maid from a Holiday Inn he worked at, Heidi Morris, filed a sexual harassment lawsuit against him. In the lawsuit, Morris claimed that he incessantly stalked, wrote love letters and fondled her, and on one occasion even locked her in a cleaning closet in an attempt to force her into having sex. In addition to this, she claimed that other employees were afraid of him due to his bad temper, and that he even went so far as to change the lock of the room when the pair had sex, which she described as being very violent and rough. Piper himself denied the accusations and claimed that it was consensual, only admitting that he had indeed cheated on his wife. The matter was eventually settled out of court for an undisclosed amount of money.

== Murders ==
On August 23, 1993, the body of 36-year-old Patricia Lange was found in room 732 of a Holiday Inn in West Des Moines, Iowa, by an employee who worked there. She had been tied up, and evidently strangled with some sort of ligature. At the time of her death, Lange had just recently returned to her native Iowa from Denver, Colorado and started a job as a database administrator for Northwest Mortgages, Inc. As she was known as an academically gifted woman with no known enemies, the killing came as a shock to everyone who knew her. Despite seizing her loaned car and gathering various items from the crime scene, the investigators were unable to identify a potential suspect in the case. In response to this, her employers and the owners of the Holiday Inn offered a $50,000 reward for any information that could lead to an arrest.

Four years later, on September 4, 1997, 21-year-old Zurijeta Sakanovic was found stabbed to death at a Budgetel Inn in Clive. Sakanovic, who had recently immigrated to the States with her family from Teslić, Bosnia and Herzegovina, worked as a maid at the hotel along with other refugees fleeing persecution in their native country. Like with Lange before her, there were no immediate suspects in Sakanovic's killing, and the case went cold after some time. Due to the shock they experienced over their daughter's murder, the Sakanovic family decided to leave the United States and return to Bosnia.

== Arrest, trial and imprisonment ==
In mid-January 2000, police started centering their attention on Piper, as he worked as a mechanical engineer in the aforementioned hotels and thus had keys for every room in the building. Before any charges were brought against him, he agreed to be interviewed by The Des Moines Register, in which he complained that the police surveillance was ruining his family life and had cost him his job due to their practises. This sentiment was echoed by his lawyer, Alfredo Parrish, who claimed that the officers' conduct was "outrageous."

A few days after this interview, Piper was officially charged with Lange's murder. Upon learning this, he surrendered himself at the local police station, accompanied by his lawyer. After his arrest, he was held at Polk County Jail on a $500,000 bond. He was eventually brought to trial for her murder, but it eventually resulted in a mistrial because the prosecution mishandled evidence and failed to disclose the fact that they had DNA swab evidence that they previously claimed had been destroyed, according to Parrish. Due to this, the trial was rescheduled for January 2001.

This initial date was pushed to April 2001, as Piper had to undergo drug therapy in February and was considered temporarily incompetent to stand trial. After regaining competence, he was put on trial and eventually convicted of Lange's murder, for which he received the mandatory sentence of life imprisonment without parole. The following year, he was tried for Sakanovic's murder, and due to the overwhelming amount of evidence linking him to the case, he was again found guilty and given a second life term without parole. At the sentencing phase, Sakanovic's sister-in-law Emsuda made a statement in court proclaiming that their family despised him and wished for his suffering in prison, to which Piper did not reply.

After his conviction, Piper was transferred to serve his sentence at the Iowa State Penitentiary in Fort Madison. In 2009, he filed an appeal to the Polk County Court, claiming ineffective assistance of counsel. This claim was rejected by Justice Joel Novak, who claimed that his lawyers were professionals and made none of the mistakes that he claimed they had made in his appeal.

As of April 2025, Piper is still incarcerated at Iowa State Penitentiary.

== Other possible victims ==
Shortly before the start of Lange trial, The Des Moines Register published in an article in which it was claimed that multiple police agencies were investigating Piper as a suspect in the murders of four additional women. They were the following:

- Connie Jo Bodensteiner (August 8, 1995): a 24-year-old prostitute whose half-naked body was found inside a storage locker in Des Moines. She had been strangled to death, was last seen leaving the Polk County Courthouse on August 1. Police investigated multiple people in relation to her killing, but none led to an arrest.
- Martha Erickson (November 22, 1995): a 47-year-old woman whose body was found in an unincorporated area near Carlisle by two people walking their dogs. She had been stabbed, beaten to death and finally drowned, with the water washing away most of the potential evidence. Authorities investigated Piper and another man, convicted sex offender and murderer Jerry Lee Proctor, but neither man was charged with her killing.
- Julie Bell Davis (August 28, 1997): a 33-year-old advertising company employee who was found stabbed to death in the backroom of an office in downtown Des Moines. She had been repeatedly stabbed in the chest, and showed no signs of sexual assault. Piper was among the suspect questioned in this case, but was not charged.
- Mariana Redrovan (January 16, 1998): a 15-year-old Ecuadorian maid who was found stabbed to death at the hotel she worked in West Des Moines. Piper was repeatedly questioned in this specific case, as it heavily resembled his confirmed murders, but was never charged and law enforcement have refused to confirm whether he still remains a suspect.

== In Media ==
The case was covered by multiple television show, including: Cold Case Files, Unusual Suspects and I, Detective.
