= I, Detective =

American TV series

- Also known as: Detective Files (alternative title)
- Genre: True crime
- Country of origin: United States
- Original language: English
- No. of seasons: 5
- No. of episodes: 37

Production
- Producer: Michael Hoff Productions
- Running time: 30 minutes (including commercials)

Original release
- Network: Court TV
- Release: August 30, 2001 – April 7, 2006

I, Detective is an American documentary-style series that aired on Court TV (now truTV) from 2001 to 2006.

For a time in early 2014, the show returned in reruns on sister network HLN. At first, it was retitled Detective Files, but a month later, the show returned to its original title. The reruns have been repackaged to include updates at the end of some episodes on what became of the suspect(s) or parties involved since the final verdicts. Reruns aired on the Justice Network in 2015.

== Synopsis ==
Armchair detectives and forensic science junkies get the opportunity to solve real cases. This half-hour series aired weekly and gave viewers the opportunity to follow clues, find evidence and learn how this information is used to solve some of the most intriguing criminal investigations. I, Detective combined the elements of documentary, murder mystery, and quiz shows. Through an interactive series of multiple-choice questions, I, Detective challenged viewers to examine the same evidence, suspects, motives and witness statements that actual investigators consider in their quest to solve the crime. Art Bell, Executive Vice President of Programming and Marketing said "The questions included in I, Detective give our viewers a chance to be active participants in the investigation. They examine the crime scene, evaluate evidence, and attempt to correctly answer questions that real criminologists and forensic specialists ask themselves as they solve a crime." I, Detective was produced by Michael Hoff Productions.

== Cases ==
The show has covered many infamous cases of the past like: Murder of Joey Fischer, Murder of Neal Rosenblum, Murder of Kristine Fitzhugh and Murder of Mia Zapata. The show also covered many serial killer cases like: Stella Nickell, Donald Piper, Roger Kibbe or the Bellevue murders.
