= The Carbonaro Effect =

American comedy and reality television series

- Genre: Comedy; Reality television
- Created by: Michael Carbonaro
- Showrunner: Russell Arch
- Directed by: Russell Arch; Phil Britton; Leo Scherman; Mark Niedelson
- Starring: Michael Carbonaro
- Country of origin: United States
- Original language: English
- No. of seasons: 5
- No. of episodes: 90 (plus 16 specials) (list of episodes)

Production
- Camera setup: Hidden camera
- Running time: 22 minutes
- Production companies: Fields Entertainment; 11 Productions; Trifecta Entertainment & Media (syndication)

Original release
- Network: TruTV
- Release: April 1, 2014 – January 9, 2020

The Carbonaro Effect is an American comedy and reality television series hosted by magician and prankster Michael Carbonaro, who performs tricks on people caught on hidden camera. It debuted on April 1, 2014, and has been aired on TruTV. To promote the second half of the first season, TBS aired a two-hour marathon on October 30, 2014.

The second season premiered on April 1, 2015; the third season premiered on February 1, 2017; and the fourth season premiered on May 17, 2018, along with a new insider series titled The Carbonaro Effect: Inside Carbonaro. On October 11, 2019, it was announced that the fifth season would premiere on November 7, 2019. Carbonaro chose to bring the show to an end after its fifth season.

== Format ==
The Carbonaro Effect is a hidden-camera television series in which magician Michael Carbonaro performs illusions and practical jokes on members of the public. Carbonaro typically disguises himself as an employee or worker in an everyday setting, using specially designed props and apparent technological innovations to convince people that something impossible has occurred. The reactions are recorded using hidden cameras.

The program combines sleight of hand, visual illusions, misdirection and improvisation. Episodes feature several shorter tricks alongside longer segments involving more elaborate setups. The series also includes reactions from people who discover that they have participated in a television show.

== Production ==
The series was produced for TruTV by Fields Entertainment and 11 Television. Simon Fields and Kevin Healey were among the original executive producers. The program was initially announced in February 2014 under the working title Undercover Magic, before production proceeded under the title The Carbonaro Effect.

Carbonaro worked with producers and other magicians to develop the show's illusions, props and scenarios. In a 2018 interview with Reality Blurred, he described a production crew of approximately 30 people and a six-camera setup used to capture reactions from different angles. The production team also coordinated participants' positions and managed the filming environment to maintain camera visibility.

According to Carbonaro, the production process involved brainstorming ideas for tricks and identifying suitable locations in which to perform them. Some elaborate segments required multiple attempts, while the show's editing combined footage from different cameras to emphasize the participants' experiences and preserve the presentation of the illusions.

The series was filmed in Georgia, according to TruTV's official program description.

== Broadcast history ==
The Carbonaro Effect premiered on TruTV on April 1, 2014, with a preview episode, followed by its regular series premiere on May 15, 2014.

The second season premiered on April 1, 2015, with a special episode, followed by additional episodes later that year. The third season premiered on February 1, 2017, and the fourth season premiered on May 17, 2018.

In October 2019, TruTV announced that the fifth season would return on November 7, 2019. The season's eight regular episodes concluded with "Puppification," which aired on January 2, 2020.

The fifth season marked the end of the original series. In a later interview, Carbonaro explained that he had decided to end the program himself rather than having it canceled by the network. He also described the final episode's closing scene as a deliberate ending for the series.

== Episodes ==
Season	Episodes	Originally released	
Season	Episodes	First released	Last released
1	25	April 1, 2014	January 22, 2015
2	26	July 29, 2015	June 8, 2016
3	17	February 1, 2017	January 18, 2018
4	16	May 17, 2018	February 7, 2019
5	9	November 7, 2019	January 9, 2020
Double Takes	12	January 18, 2018	August 1, 2019
Specials	13	July 31, 2014	June 6, 2019

== Spin-offs ==
=== Inside Carbonaro ===
The Carbonaro Effect: Inside Carbonaro premiered on TruTV on May 17, 2018, alongside the fourth-season premiere of the original series. The companion program revisited earlier segments and featured Carbonaro providing additional information about the tricks, their production and previously unseen footage.

=== Double Takes ===
The Carbonaro Effect: Double Takes revisits segments from the original series, featuring previously unseen footage and new reactions to earlier tricks. Fields Entertainment lists the program as a TruTV production spanning 2018 to 2020.
