= North Mission Road =

- Country of origin: United States
- No. of episodes: 155 (approx)

Production
- Running time: 30 mins. (approx)

Original release
- Network: truTV; Justice Network
- Release: February 24, 2003 – 2007

North Mission Road is a documentary-style show that details "unique and compelling" cases of the Los Angeles County Coroner Department. It was first aired on truTV, and now airs in reruns on the Justice Network. The name of the show is based on the road on which the office of the Los Angeles County Coroner is located.
