= Bait Car (TV series) =

American reality crime television series (2007–2012)

- Country of origin: United States
- Original language: English
- No. of seasons: 5
- No. of episodes: 135

Production
- Producer: KKI Productions
- Running time: 30 minutes

Original release
- Network: Court TV (now truTV)
- Release: August 6, 2007 – October 23, 2012

Bait Car is an American television series that aired on the truTV network. The show depicted police officers targeting criminals with a high-tech bait car, rigged with hidden cameras and radio trackers. Footage is shown from in-car cameras, police car dashcams, and film crews with the police officers. The show holds a TV-14 rating due to strong language, although most of the profanity is censored.

== Production and broadcast history ==
The Bait Car series premiered on August 6, 2007, on Court TV, now truTV. Season two of the show premiered in August 2009 on truTV. Season three premiered in June 2010. The first three seasons of the show were primarily shot in Los Angeles County and New Orleans.

Bait Car began airing a fourth season in December 2010 on Mondays at 8:30 p.m. EST. Shot in San Francisco, this fourth season was produced by KKI Productions. A 2007 Honda Accord was used as the bait car. Season 5 aired from January 2012 to October 2012. The show was not renewed for a sixth season.

Reruns of Bait Car continue to air on truTV, and as of January 2015 on True Crime Network. However, as of 2024, it appears to be no longer airing on the network.

== Format ==
In this crime reality series, teams of undercover officers drive the bait car to areas with high rates of auto theft, where they park it and leave it unattended with the engine running. The idea is that would-be car thieves will hop in and drive away. Unbeknownst to the criminals, a hidden camera and a radio tracker have been placed on the dashboard, and a police force is watching their every move. The thief is then tracked down and arrested.

Bait Car operations typically call for about a dozen officers on duty, and the cases are often charged as misdemeanors. Chicago police officers stage the car in a different manner, allowing offenders to be charged with felony possession of a stolen motor vehicle, burglary, or both. Chicago Police Officers do not leave the car running with the keys in the ignition, or with the doors open. In rare instances, teams suspend the bait car operations to pursue a vehicle that was already stolen.

The show was created by production company Departure Films, based out of New York, NY.

== Controversy ==
Opponents of Bait Car expressed concern that the show merely creates crime and might even be considered entrapment.

Those in law enforcement argue that the show is a legitimate and effective way to catch auto thieves. "John Q Public doesn't climb into bait cars," a Florida officer states. "We are talking about people who have been arrested time and time again. Everybody we've arrested with a bait car has had an extensive criminal record."

During season 5, LA prosecutors dropped charges against Keenen Alex after TV footage showed Detective Anthony Shapiro failed to read him a Miranda warning. Detective Shapiro asked Alex, "You watch TV. You know your rights and all that?".

== Departments featured ==
State	Cities	Agencies
Alabama	Birmingham	Birmingham Police Department
California	Los Angeles County; San Bernardino; San Francisco	California Highway Patrol; Criminal Investigations Unit; Los Angeles County Sheriff's Department; San Francisco Police Department; Taskforce for Regional Autotheft Prevention
Georgia	Atlanta	Atlanta Police Department
Illinois	Chicago	Chicago Police Department
Louisiana	New Orleans	New Orleans Police Department
Nevada	Las Vegas	Las Vegas Metropolitan Police Department; Vehicle Investigations Project for Enforcement and Recovery
Texas	Houston	Houston Police Department; Harris County Sheriff's Office
Washington	Seattle; Spokane; Tacoma; Everett; Yakima	King County Sheriff's Office; Snohomish County
