= Ocean Force =

- Presented by: Rick Blakely
- Country of origin: United States
- No. of seasons: 3
- No. of episodes: 42

Production
- Running time: Approx 30 minutes (including commercials)

Original release
- Network: truTV
- Release: August 27, 2007 – February 16, 2009

Ocean Force is an American television series that began airing in 2007 and ended in 2009. The series follows lifeguards on busy beaches, and the work they do from water rescues to keeping order on the beach. The series aired on truTV.

== Broadcast and distribution ==
Country	Network	Series Premiere	Airs
Australia	Seven Network	15 March 2010	Monday 11:00pm
