= TruTV =

American cable and satellite television channel

- Country: United States
- Broadcast area: Worldwide
- Headquarters: Ted Turner Campus, 1050 Techwood Drive, Atlanta, Georgia, U.S.

Programming
- Picture format: 1080i (HDTV) (downscaled to letterboxed 480i for the SDTV feed)

Ownership
- Parent: Skydance Corporation
- Sister channels: list of assets owned by Skydance

History
- Founded: December 14, 1990; 35 years ago
- Launched: July 1, 1991; 35 years ago (as Court TV); January 1, 2008; 18 years ago (as TruTV)
- Replaced: Court TV (cable television)

Links
- Webcast: Watch Live (U.S. pay-TV subscribers only; 10 minute free trial)
- Website: trutv.com

Availability

Streaming media
- Affiliated Streaming Service: HBO Max
- Service(s): DirecTV Stream, Hulu + Live TV, Sling TV, YouTube TV

TruTV (stylized as truTV) is an American basic cable channel owned by Skydance Corporation. The channel primarily broadcasts reruns of comedy, docusoaps and reality shows, with a recent strong primetime focus on live sports. The channel was originally launched on December 14, 1990 as Court TV, a network that focused on crime-themed programs such as true crime documentary series, legal dramas, and coverage of prominent criminal cases. The channel was initially a joint venture between Time Warner, Cablevision, American Lawyer Media, Liberty Media and GE with Liberty joining the venture a year after its launch in 1991.

By 2005, Liberty Media and Time Warner had purchased ALM, Cablevision and GE's stakes in Court TV. Time Warner subsequently bought out Liberty's share in 2006 for $735 million, and brought the channel under the Turner Broadcasting System. In 2008, the channel relaunched as TruTV, changing its focus to action-oriented docusoaps and "caught on camera" programs, which it marketed as "actuality" television. The channel continued to carry legal coverage during the daytime hours under the title In Session, but that was phased out by September 2013. The Court TV name was later bought by Katz Broadcasting (now Scripps Networks), which since 2017 has been part of the E. W. Scripps Company.

In 2011, the channel began to add occasional sports broadcasts from Turner Sports (renamed TNT Sports in 2023), primarily the NCAA men's basketball tournament. In October 2014, TruTV pivoted its format to focus more on comedy-based reality series, such as Impractical Jokers. In March 2024, TruTV began to increase its focus on sports programming, introducing a weeknight block that will feature sports-related programming, as well as being incorporated into new and upcoming TNT Sports rights such as MotoGP and NASCAR. Around January 2016, TruTV was available to approximately 91 million households (78.1%) in the United States. By June 2023, this number has dropped to 68.3 million households.

== History ==
=== Court TV ===
The Courtroom Television Network, or Court TV for short, was launched on July 1, 1991, at 6:00 a.m. Eastern Time, and was available to three million subscribers. Its original anchors were Jack Ford, Fred Graham, Cynthia McFadden, and Gregg Jarrett. The network was born out of two competing projects to launch cable channels with live courtroom proceedings, the American Trial Network from Time Warner and American Lawyer Media (ALM), and In Court from Cablevision and GE. Both projects were present at the National Cable Television Association in June 1990. Rather than trying to establish two competing networks, the projects were combined on December 14, 1990. Liberty Media would join the venture in 1991.

The channel originally consisted of live courtroom trials that are interspersed with anchors and reporters. It was led by law writer Steven Brill, who later left the network in 1997. The network came into its own during the Menéndez brothers' first trial in 1994, and the O.J. Simpson murder trial in 1995.

In 1997, Time Warner acquired ALM to gain ownership of its stake in Court TV; it subsequently sold its publications to a private equity fund in 1998. In 1998, GE sold its share of the network to Time Warner. That same year, Court TV began running several original and acquired programs in prime time, such as Homicide: Life on the Street, Cops, and Forensic Files.

In 2001, Court TV purchased The Smoking Gun, a website that focuses on legal items such as mug shots and other public documents pertaining to famous individuals and cases. The site remained a property of the company through the rebranding to TruTV, but was sold back to its founder in 2014. In the same year, Court TV also purchased the website Crime Library, which provided detailed information about infamous crimes and how they were solved. The website remained an actively updated TruTV property until 2014 and was taken offline in 2015.

On February 3, 2003, "Court TV Plus" debuted on Sirius Satellite Radio, featuring audio from Court TV programs. Launched on Channel 134, it was moved in September 2005 and aired on Channel 110 until the channel ceased operations on January 1, 2008.

Recognizing the growth of its primetime programming, Court TV announced in 2005 that it would split its programming into two brands. Daytime trial coverage was branded as Court TV News, while other dayparts—promoted under the tagline "Seriously Entertaining"—focused on reality shows dealing with crime-related topics. In January 2006, the network launched a male-targeted programming block known as "RED" ("Real. Exciting. Dramatic.").

In May 2006, Time Warner acquired Liberty Media's stake in Court TV for $735 million, valuing the channel at $1.5 billion. The channel was integrated into Time Warner's Turner Broadcasting unit; executives indicated that Court TV planned to maintain its existing format, and did not rule out creating synergies with CNN for their legal coverage. In 2007, the channel premiered its first original scripted series, 'Til Death Do Us Part—an anthology of crime re-enactments hosted by filmmaker John Waters.

=== TruTV ===
Previous truTV Logo used from January 1, 2008, to October 26, 2014.

On July 11, 2007, Time Warner announced that Court TV would be relaunched as TruTV on January 1, 2008. The new brand was intended to accompany a larger shift towards action-oriented reality series which did not necessarily involve crime or law enforcement, such as Black Gold, Hardcore Pawn, Lizard Lick Towing, Ocean Force, and the caught-on-camera series World's Dumbest.... TruTV promoted its new positioning under the slogan "Not Reality. Actuality."; network staff argued that the term "reality" had become associated with "unrealistic" programming, and that it wanted to emphasize that its new programs would feature "real" people.

As part of the re-branding as TruTV, daytime trial coverage was cut back to 9:00 a.m. to 3:00 p.m. ET and branded as In Session. In 2009, production of the program was shifted to the facilities of HLN in Atlanta. On March 4, 2013, In Session was cut to a two-hour, taped format. On September 30, 2013, In Session was cancelled, and replaced by a block of library programming under the title In Session Presents.

In 2011, as part of a new partnership between CBS Sports and Turner Sports, TruTV began to broadcast coverage of the NCAA Division I men's basketball tournament.

Reruns of Court TV series have since aired on HLN (primarily Forensic Files), and have also been syndicated to the over-the-air digital network Justice Network (now True Crime Network). With changes to HLN's programming strategy and the growing popularity of the genre, the network began to produce and premiere more original true crime programs in 2017. In December 2018, Turner sold the rights to the Court TV brand and programming library to the E. W. Scripps Company's Katz Broadcasting unit, which relaunched it as an over-the-air digital network in May 2019, reviving the dormant brand after 11 years.

==== Shift to comedy ====
Although noting that it had experienced "tremendous success" with individual programs, TruTV's new president and head of programming Chris Linn explained that the network's overall growth as a brand had been hindered due to its lingering association with Court TV and its tone of programming, and its reliance on "conflict-reliant, heavy, dramatic and maybe overly produced" docuseries with derivative premises. In April 2014, the network announced that it would undergo a brand repositioning for the 2014–15 television season aimed towards "funseekers", with a focus on comedy-oriented docusoaps, semi-scripted series, sketch comedies and reality competitions.

Building upon the success of Impractical Jokers (which Linn compared to a "canary in the coal mine" due to its contrasting premise to other truTV programs at the time) and The Carbonaro Effect, the network greenlit a number of new series as part of the re-launch, including Barmageddon, the "reality musical" Branson Famous, Fake Off, Hack My Life, and Kart Life. As part of the relaunch, a new marketing campaign ("Way More Fun") and updated logo were introduced on October 27, 2014, with the channel being temporarily marketed as "The New truTV" to emphasize the change in format.

Since the repositioning, TruTV has also parodied its temporary prominence during the NCAA tournament with various advertising campaigns, seeking to promote the channel and its programming to the expanded audience. A common theme of these campaigns, which have included the 2015 social media campaign "#HaveUFoundtrutv", and a "truTV Awareness Month" campaign in 2018, involved commenting upon viewers who were having trouble finding TruTV on their television provider's lineup, or were unaware of the channel entirely. Of the former, Puja Vohra, Senior vice president of marketing and digital, explained that the campaign was intended to portray the network's brand as being "fun" and "self-aware".

In December 2016, truTV unveiled a new marketing campaign and slogan, "Funny Because It's tru". The campaign reinforced the network's focus on comedy by satirizing the "cliches" of television promos.

On March 4, 2019, AT&T announced a major reorganization of its broadcasting assets to effectively dissolve Turner Broadcasting. Its assets were dispersed across multiple units of WarnerMedia with TruTV along with TBS, TNT and HBO moving to newly formed WarnerMedia Entertainment.

=== Expansion of sports programming ===
On March 11, 2024, TruTV soft launched a new evening and primetime block focused on TNT Sports content. This will include alternate and simulcast broadcasts of sporting events carried by its sister networks, as well as new studio shows, and sports-related documentaries and films. The division's vice president Luis Silberwasser stated that the block would give TNT Sports a more "consistent" and "comprehensive" presence on its networks. As part of these changes, the channel's last original non-sports series, Impractical Jokers, would also move permanently to TBS beginning that summer (after having recently simulcast new episodes with TruTV). After its soft launch, it was announced in July 2024 that the block would be given a more "pronounced" presence and branding beginning in October. Starting with the 2025 edition, the network is used for all-day rotating coverage and replays for tennis's French Open.

== High definition ==
The 1080 high-definition simulcast feed of TruTV is available on all major cable and satellite providers. In March 2011, the channel saw carriage of its HD feed increase, due to its coverage of the 2011 NCAA Division I men's basketball tournament (and subsequent tournaments), which was its first-ever live sports telecast.

== Programming ==
Presently, TruTV airs a mix of original comedy-genre reality and lifestyle series (such as Impractical Jokers, The Carbonaro Effect, and Adam Ruins Everything), as well as acquired sitcoms (such as American Dad! and Family Matters) and films.

=== Sports programming ===
==== Occasional coverage (2010–2022) ====
On February 8, 2010, TruTV premiered NFL Full Contact, a show that gave a behind-the-scenes look at the television production for major football events such as the Super Bowl, the NFL draft, the Pro Bowl, and the season opener; the show was not renewed for a second season.

On March 15, 2011, TruTV began airing live sports programming for the first time with its telecasts of the 2011 NCAA Division I men's basketball tournament. The agreement is part of a contract between Turner Sports and CBS Sports resulting in shared coverage of the NCAA men's tournament through 2032. TruTV airs games during the opening rounds of the tournament, and exclusively carries the First Four, which was concurrently introduced the same year. It also carries the studio show Inside March Madness during the tournament. Until its discontinuation, TruTV also aired the pre-season Coaches vs. Cancer Classic.

In 2015, TruTV carried a series of HBO-produced Top Rank boxing telecasts under the title MetroPCS Friday Night Knockout, as a companion to HBO World Championship Boxing. In May 2016, TruTV broadcast the opening rounds of the inaugural NCAA Beach Volleyball Championship; Turner would also televise the event in 2017.

In 2021, TruTV began to serve as an overflow outlet for the NHL on TNT, in the event that a game in a TNT doubleheader runs long.

==== Expansion of sports (2023–present) ====
Beginning with the 2023 MLB postseason, Warner Bros. Discovery began expanding the number of sports offerings on TruTV. TruTV first simulcast TBS's coverage of the 2023 National League Division Series, then provided the alternate broadcast Pelotoros during the NLCS, which was hosted by Alanna Rizzo and featured a panel of Hispanic and Latin American MLB players. In November 2023, TruTV began airing the Hall of Fame Series, an early-season college basketball showcase in Las Vegas. TruTV was announced as part of NASCAR's new media rights with TNT beginning in 2025, airing practice and qualifying sessions for 19 NASCAR Cup Series races per season.

During the 2023 NBA In-Season Tournament, TruTV began airing a sports betting focused alternate telecast. This was shown for two quarterfinal games and TNT's semifinal game. The "BetCast" airs alongside the TNT broadcast for select games. In March 2024, TruTV and Max acquired the U.S. rights to the MotoGP series. In the 2023–24 NHL season, TruTV aired multiple alternate broadcasts, including a February 14, 2024 broadcast featuring Paul Bissonnette and the panel of his Spittin' Chiclets podcast, an April 14 broadcast featuring a real-time 3D animated version of the game promoting the Warner Bros. Games-published video game MultiVersus, and the NHL DataCast during the Western Conference final.

Ahead of the 2024 NCAA Division I men's basketball tournament, TruTV announced a new slate of sports-related studio programs as part of its relaunched primetime lineup, which includes the evening programs TNT Sports Tonight, (Note: Announced as TNT Sports Update, but renamed at launch. The program is produced by CNN (and more prominently billed since September 2024 as being "powered by CNN"), which previously aired the sports news program Sports Tonight from 1980 to 2002.) hosted by CNN sports correspondent Coy Wire, and the sports betting show The Line, hosted by Adam Lefkoe. TruTV also airs the NBA TV program #Handles and a weekly House of Highlights television series hosted by "The Broadcast Boys".

Ahead of the 2024 NCAA Division I FBS football season, TNT Sports signed a broadcasting agreement with the Mountain West Conference to broadcast 14 of the conference's games on TruTV. Despite being announced as a multi-year agreement, it was not renewed beyond the 2024 season. In September 2024, FanDuel TV began syndicating its studio show Up & Adams (hosted by former NFL Network host Kay Adams) on TruTV; the program had also been syndicated to Max.

In October 2024, TNT and TruTV acquired the rights to the then-upcoming women's three-on-three basketball league Unrivaled.

In 2025, TruTV began airing coverage of the French Open as part of TNT Sports' rights to the tournament; TruTV primarily airs the whiparound show The Rally.

=== As Court TV ===
In Session logo.

As Court TV, the channel's programming traditionally consisted of reality legal programming and legal dramas, such as legal-based news shows, legal-based talk shows, live homicide trial coverage, court shows, police force shows, and other criminal justice programming.

The channel also carried a week-daily news block, In Session (the successor to Court TV News), which provided live coverage of trials, legal news and details of highly publicized crimes Monday through Fridays from 9 to 11 a.m. ET (except during national holidays, with reruns of the channel's reality programming airing in place of the block on such days). Its coverage included analysis from anchors and guests to help viewers understand legal proceedings. In Session also ran a blog, Sidebar, where the In Session team posted updated legal news and analysis. In Session moved to a new studio in Atlanta at the CNN Center on November 16, 2009. Online coverage of current trials later moved to CNN.com's "Crime" section and production of the block was eventually taken over by sister network HLN. In Session anchors also appeared on CNN to provide legal analysis about current crime stories and trials. The block ended on September 26, 2013.

== International ==
=== Canada ===
Court TV Canada, owned by CHUM Limited (and later acquired by CTVglobemedia which then sold its assets to Bell Canada under the Bell Media subsidiary), launched on September 7, 2001. Unlike its U.S. counterpart, it did not relaunch under the TruTV name and continued its previous format until August 30, 2010, when, as part of a wider licensing agreement with Discovery Communications and CTV, Court TV Canada was rebranded as a Canadian version of Investigation Discovery.

The U.S. version of Court TV had earlier been approved by the Canadian Radio-television and Telecommunications Commission as an eligible foreign channel in 1997, and indeed, had been carried by several Canadian service providers prior to the launch of the domestic service. Even after its rebrand, TruTV was never withdrawn as an eligible foreign service for carriage on cable and satellite, meaning that, particularly with the end of the licensing agreement with CHUM, there were few theoretical hurdles that prevented TruTV from re-emerging on Canadian service providers.

Ultimately, the rights to TruTV's original programs have been dispersed across other Canadian cable channels, particularly CMT and Action, both owned by Corus Entertainment, and OLN, owned by Rogers Media. Of the three networks, Action had been the predominant broadcaster of TruTV programming. On April 1, 2019, Action was converted to a new full-time Adult Swim network.

=== Latin America ===
The channel was launched on April 1, 2009, in Latin America replacing Retro, also owned by Turner Broadcasting System. The announcement was made on March 25, 2009, by Turner Broadcasting System Latin America. The channel has the same programming, idents, and bumpers from the U.S. version. On September 3, 2023, it was announced that TruTV would be replaced by 24/7 channel, Adult Swim on October 31.

=== UK and Ireland ===
In May 2014, Turner Broadcasting System announced that it would launch a separate UK version of the U.S. channel. On February 16, 2017, Sony Pictures Television acquired the channel from Turner. On February 12, 2019, the UK channel was renamed True Crime.

=== Asia ===
The channel was launched on April 1, 2010, in several markets in Asia including Indonesia, the Philippines, and Singapore. The channel is owned and operated by Turner Broadcasting System Asia Pacific and has similar programming, idents, and bumpers to the U.S. version, but many are also created by the Turner regional office in Hong Kong. As of 31 December 2018, the selected TruTV programmes is currently shown on Warner TV Asia. The channel shut down alongside TCM.
