= List of animated television series of 2023 =

This is a list of animated television series scheduled to air, or that were first aired in 2023.

| Title | Seasons | Episodes | Country | Year | Original channel | Technique |
|---|---|---|---|---|---|---|
| 123 Number Squad! | 2 | 104 | Singapore | 2023–24 | Sky Kids; Channel 5 | CGI |
| 333: The Rise of Heroes | 1 | 7 | Philippines | 2023 | | Flash/Traditional |
| Adventure Time: Fionna and Cake | 2 | 20 | United States | 2023–present | Max | Traditional |
| The Adventures of Ping & Roar | 4 | 82 | United States | 2023–present | YouTube | Toon Boom Harmony |
| Agent Elvis | 1 | 10 | United States | 2023 | Netflix | Flash |
| The Amazing Digital Circus | 1 | 9 | Australia | 2023–26 | YouTube | CGI |
| AquaTeam - Sea Adventures | 1 | 4 | Italy | 2023–present | Rai Kids | Flash |
| Atom Town | 1 | 26 | Ireland; Canada | 2023 | RTÉjr | Flash |
| Bastions | 1 | 5 | South Korea | 2023 | Crunchyroll; SBS | CGI |
| Bea's Block | 1 | 20 | United States | 2023–24 | Cartoonito | CGI |
| Blue Eye Samurai | 2 | 8 | United States | 2023–present | Netflix | CGI/Traditional |
| BooSnoo! | 3 | 59 | United Kingdom | 2023–present | Sky Kids | CGI |
| Bossy Bear | 1 | 30 | United States | 2023–24 | Nickelodeon | Flash |
| Builder Brothers Dream Factory | 1 | 24 | Canada | 2023 | Treehouse TV | CGI |
| Cabeon | 1 | 52 | South Korea | 2023–24 | KBS1 | CGI |
| Captain Fall | 1 | 10 | United States | 2023 | Netflix | Flash |
| Captain Laserhawk: A Blood Dragon Remix | 1 | 6 | France; United States | 2023 | Netflix | Traditional |
| Carol & the End of the World | 1 | 10 | United States | 2023 | Netflix | Flash |
| Castlevania: Nocturne | 2 | 16 | United States | 2023–present | Netflix | Traditional |
| Chip Chilla | 2 | 23 | United States | 2023–24 | Bentkey | Flash |
| Clone High (2023) | 2 | 20 | United States | 2023–24 | Max | Flash |
| Cocomelon Lane | 8 | 28 | United States; Canada; United Kingdom | 2023–present | Netflix | CGI |
| The Crunchers | 1 | 52 | France; Italy | 2023 | Canal+ Rai Gulp | Flash |
| Cozmo & Friends | 1 | 36 | Ireland | 2023 | RTÉjr | Flash |
| Curses! | 2 | 20 | United States | 2023–24 | Apple TV+ | CGI/Traditional |
| D.P.A. Mini | 1 | 26 | Brazil | 2023 | Gloobinho | Flash |
| Dew Drop Diaries | 2 | 40 | United States | 2023 | Netflix | CGI |
| Digman! | 2 | 16 | United States | 2023 | Comedy Central | Flash |
| Dino Pops | 1 | 36 | United States | 2023–24 | Peacock | CGI |
| Eva the Owlet | 2 | 17 | United States | 2023–25 | Apple TV+ | CGI |
| Esquadrão do Mar Azul | 2 | 16 | Brazil | 2023 | TV Cultura | Flash |
| Fabulous Beasts | 4 | 60 | China | 2023–present | Bilibili | Traditional |
| Fired on Mars | 1 | 8 | United States | 2023 | HBO Max | Traditional |
| Fright Krewe | 2 | 20 | United States | 2023–24 | Peacock; Hulu | Traditional/Flash |
| Frog and Toad | 2 | 18 | United States | 2023–24 | Apple TV+ | Flash |
| Funny Little Monsters | 1 | 52 | Ireland | 2023–present | RTÉjr | Flash |
| Galapagos X | 1 | 26 | Canada | 2023 | TVOKids | Flash |
| The Girl Downstairs | 1 | 22 | China | 2023 | Bilibili | Traditional |
| Go Go Around Italy | 1 | 52 | Italy | 2023–present | Rai Yoyo | Flash |
| Gremlins: Secrets of the Mogwai | 2 | 20 | United States | 2023–25 | Max | CGI |
| Gulte Mama | 1 | 300 | India | 2023–present | Sony Aath | |
| Hailey's On It! | 1 | 30 | United States | 2023–24 | Disney Channel | Traditional |
| Hero Inside | 2 | 22 | South Korea; China; Thailand | 2023–24 | Tooniverse; HBO Max | CGI |
| O Hotel Silvestre de Ana Flor | 1 | 13 | Brazil | 2023 | Discovery Kids | Flash |
| Isabel & Nicki's Super Duper Twin Adventures | 1 | 6 | United States | 2023 | YouTube Kids | Flash |
| Isadora Moon | 1 | 39 | United Kingdom | 2023–present | Sky Kids | Flash |
| iYo | 1 | 18 | Singapore | 2023 | Channel 5 | Flash |
| Jessica's Big Little World | 1 | 20 | United States | 2023–24 | Cartoon Network | Traditional |
| Kalpopurer Galpo | 1 | 53 | India | 2023–present | Sony Aath | |
| Karate Sheep | 2 | 26 | France | 2023–24 | Netflix | CGI/Flash |
| Kiff | 3 | 61 | United States; South Africa | 2023–present | Disney Channel | Traditional |
| Kitti Katz | 1 | 10 | United States | 2023 | Netflix | CGI |
| Kiya & the Kimoja Heroes | 1 | 26 | South Africa; France; Canada; United States | 2023–24 | Disney Junior | CGI |
| Kizazi Moto: Generation Fire | 1 | 10 | South Africa; United States | 2023 | Disney+ | CGI/Traditional |
| Koala Man | 1 | 8 | United States | 2023 | Hulu | Flash |
| Komi Witch Lara | 2 | 26 | South Korea | 2023 | Tooniverse | CGI |
| Krapopolis | 3 | 48 | United States | 2023–present | Fox | Flash/Traditional |
| Lego Friends: The Next Chapter | 3 | 44 | Denmark; France; United States | 2023–present | YouTube | CGI |
| Little Baby Bum: Music Time | 2 | 18 | United States | 2023–24 | Netflix | CGI |
| Lil' Stompers | 1 | 65 | United States | 2023–24 | Peacock | CGI |
| The Little Prince and Friends | 1 | 52 | France | 2023 | Okoo | CGI/Traditional |
| The Loodies | 1 | 52 | Russia | 2023 | Karusel | Flash |
| Lu & the Bally Bunch | 1 | 76 | Canada; United States; Ireland | 2023 | CBC Kids; Cartoonito | Flash |
| Marvel's Moon Girl and Devil Dinosaur | 2 | 41 | United States | 2023–25 | Disney Channel | Toon Boom Harmony/Traditional |
| Mech Cadets | 1 | 10 | United States; Japan | 2023 | Netflix | CGI |
| Metal Cardbot | 3 | 56 | South Korea | 2023–present | Daekyo Kids TV | CGI |
| Mini Jean et Mini-Bulle | 4 | 70 | Canada | 2023-present | Ici Radio-Canada Télé | Toon Boom Harmony/Traditional |
| Minibods | 1 | 39 | Singapore | 2023–24 | YouTube | CGI |
| Mixmups | 1 | 52 | United Kingdom | 2023 | Milkshake! | Stop-Motion |
| Mountain and Sea Organization | 1 | 25 | China | 2023 | Bilibili | CGI |
| Mulligan | 1 | 20 | United States | 2023–24 | Netflix | Flash |
| My Adventures with Superman | 2 | 20 | United States | 2023–present | Adult Swim | Traditional |
| My Dad the Bounty Hunter | 2 | 19 | United States | 2023 | Netflix | CGI |
| Night Eyes | 2 | 26 | New Zealand | 2023–25 | TVNZ+ | Flash |
| Ninjago: Dragons Rising | 3 | 60 | Canada; Denmark | 2023–present | Netflix | CGI |
| Not Quite Narwhal | 2 | 39 | United States | 2023–24 | Netflix | CGI |
| Oh My Lallan | | | India | 2023 | Sony Yay! | CGI |
| Once Upon a Time... The Objects | 1 | 78 | France; Israel; Switzerland; Bulgaria | 2023–present | RTS 1 Okoo | Flash |
| Open Season: Call of Nature | 1 | 52 | Canada; United States | 2023–24 | Family Channel | Flash |
| Pipo, Pepa & Pop | 1 | 52 | Italy | 2023–present | Rai Yoyo | Flash |
| Playdate with Winnie the Pooh | 1 | 4 | United States | 2023–present | Disney Junior | CGI |
| Poor Devil | 1 | 8 | Spain | 2023–present | HBO Max | Flash |
| Praise Petey | 1 | 10 | United States | 2023 | Freeform | Flash |
| Princess Power | 3 | 45 | United States | 2023–24 | Netflix | CGI |
| Psi Cops | 1 | 24 | Canada | 2023 | Adult Swim; StackTV | Flash/CGI |
| Punch Punch Forever! | 1 | 3 | Ireland | 2023–present | YouTube | Flash |
| Pupstruction | 3 | 75 | United States | 2023–present | Disney Jr. | CGI |
| Quantum Heroes Dinoster | 3 | 78 | South Korea | 2023–present | EBS | CGI |
| Rainbow Bubblegem | 2 | 52 | South Korea | 2023–present | EBS | CGI |
| Ray the Sunshine | 1 | 26 | Ireland | 2023 | RTÉjr | Flash |
| Red Ketchup | 1 | 20 | Canada | 2023 | Adult Swim | Flash |
| Ready Eddie Go! | 2 | 52 | United Kingdom | 2023–present | Sky Kids | CGI |
| Rey Mysterio vs. The Darkness | 1 | 10 | Mexico | 2023–present | HBO Max | Traditional/Flash |
| Riley Rocket | 1 | 30 | Canada | 2023–present | TVOKids; Knowledge | Flash |
| Ringing Fate | 1 | 12 | China | 2023 | Bilibili | CGI |
| Royal Crackers | 2 | 20 | United States | 2023–24 | Adult Swim | Flash |
| Rubble & Crew | 6 | 92 | Canada | 2023–present | Treehouse TV | CGI |
| Scavengers Reign | 1 | 12 | United States | 2023 | Max | Traditional |
| Scott Pilgrim Takes Off | 1 | 8 | United States; Japan | 2023 | Netflix | Traditional |
| Shape Island | 2 | 18 | United States | 2023–present | Apple TV+ | Stop-Motion |
| Shasha & Milo | 1 | 25 | South Korea | 2023–24 | EBS; Pop | CGI |
| Silly Sundays | 1 | 76 | United States | 2023–present | Cartoonito | Flash |
| The Singalings | 1 | 26 | United Kingdom | 2023 | Sky Kids | Flash |
| Skull Island | 1 | 8 | United States | 2023 | Netflix | Traditional |
| Spicy Spacey | 1 | 20 | United States | 2023–present | YouTube | CGI |
| Star Wars: Young Jedi Adventures | 3 | 55 | United States | 2023–25 | Disney+ Disney Jr. | CGI |
| Strange Planet | 1 | 10 | United States | 2023 | Apple TV+ | Flash |
| Sullivan Sails | 1 | 26 | Ireland | 2023 | RTÉjr | Flash |
| Supa Team 4 | 2 | 16 | United States; South Africa; United Kingdom; France | 2023 | Netflix | CGI |
| Super Turbo Story Time | 1 | 8 | United States | 2023–present | Motortrend+ | Flash/Live Action |
| Superbuns | 1 | 39 | Canada | 2023 | Peacock | Flash |
| SuperKitties | 3 | 75 | United States | 2023–present | Disney Jr. | CGI |
| Talking Angela: In the City | 2 | 30 | United States | 2023–present | YouTube | CGI |
| This World Can't Tear Me Down | 1 | 6 | Italy | 2023 | Netflix | Flash |
| Tiny Toons Looniversity | 2 | 23 | United States | 2023–25 | Cartoon Network; Max | Traditional/Flash |
| Tippi T-Rex | 1 | 26 | Spain; Canada; Indonesia | 2023–present | Toon-A-Vision | Flash |
| Toad & Friends | 1 | 52 | United Kingdom | 2023 | HBO Max | CGI |
| Tom and Jerry (2023) | 1 | 7 | Singapore; India; United States | 2023 | Cartoon Network; HBO Go | Flash |
| Tweedy & Fluff | 1 | 40 | United Kingdom | 2023–present | Channel 5 | Stop-Motion |
| Twinkle Sharma #0007 | | | India | 2023 | Disney Channel | |
| Unicorn Academy | 4 | 21 | United States; Canada | 2023–25 | Netflix | CGI |
| Unicorn: Warriors Eternal | 1 | 10 | United States | 2023 | Adult Swim | Traditional |
| Velma | 2 | 20 | United States | 2023–24 | HBO Max | Traditional |
| La Vida Secreta de tu Mente | 1 | 5 | Mexico | 2023 | Cartoon Network | Flash |
| Vida the Vet | 2 | 52 | Canada | 2023–present | Treehouse TV; CBeebies (United Kingdom) | Flash |
| Wake Up, Carlo! | 1 | 13 | Brazil | 2023 | Netflix | Flash |
| Well Versed | 1 | 12 | United Kingdom | 2023 | Nickelodeon | Flash |
| Work It Out Wombats! | 2 | 54 | United States; Canada | 2023–present | PBS Kids; TVOKids; Knowledge Network | Toon Boom Harmony |
| Young Love | 1 | 12 | United States | 2023 | Max | Flash |
| Zokie of Planet Ruby | 1 | 26 | Canada | 2023 | YTV; Amazon Prime Video | Flash |
| Zyra and the Unicorn | 2 | 7 | United States | 2023–present | YouTube | Flash (season 1); CGI (season 2) |

== See also ==
- 2023 in animation
- 2023 in anime
- List of animated feature films of 2023
