= List of Jorel's Brother episodes =

Jorel's Brother (Portuguese: Irmão do Jorel) is a Brazilian animated television series created by Juliano Enrico and produced by Copa Studio for Cartoon Network Brazil since 2012. The series debuted on September 22, 2014, and is notable for being the first animated production exclusively produced by Cartoon Network Latin America (although their first very original production was the short series Santo vs The Clones), in which was confirmed that the show premiere in the region on February 2, 2015.

On December 8, 2015, it was announced that Jorel's Brother had been renewed for a second season. On May 25, 2017, the series was renewed for a third season.

== Series overview ==
Season	Episodes	Originally released	
Season	Episodes	First released	Last released
1	26	September 22, 2014	November 16, 2015
2	26	October 10, 2016	October 2, 2017
3	26	July 16, 2018	June 24, 2019
4	26	April 2, 2021	January 27, 2022
5	23	October 18, 2024	May 16, 2025

== Episodes ==
=== Season 1 (2014–15) ===
No. overall	No. in season	Title	Written by	Storyboarded by	Original release date
1	1	"O Fenomenal Capacete com Rodinhas"	Juliano Enrico and Caíto Mainier	William Lages	September 22, 2014
2	2	"Gangorras da Revolução"	Daniel Furlan and Juliano Enrico	Rodrigo Soldado, William L de Sousa, and Gabriel De Moura	September 29, 2014
3	3	"Clube da Luta Livre"	Daniel Furlan and Juliano Enrico	Israel Oliveira dos Santos	October 6, 2014
4	4	"Não Tenha Medo do seu Medo"	Caíto Mainier	Israel Oliveira dos Santos	October 13, 2014
5	5	"Jornal do Quintal"	Arnaldo Branco	William Lages	October 20, 2014
6	6	"O Mistério dos Bilhetinhos Ultra-Secretos"	Daniel Furlan and Juliano Enrico	Gabriel de Moura and William Lages	November 3, 2014
7	7	"A Perigosa Lambada Brutal"	Juliano Enrico and Valentina Castelo Branco	William Lages	November 10, 2014
8	8	"A História Sem Começo, Meio e Fim"	Juliano Enrico and Daniel Furlan	Gabriel De Moura and William Lages	November 17, 2014
9	9	"Expressividade Máxima"	Juliano Enrico, Daniel Furlan, Valentina; Castelo Branco, and Victor Gaspari Canela	Israel Oliveira dos Santos and William Lages	January 12, 2015
10	10	"O Terrível Ataque dos Piolhos Mutantes"	Juliano Enrico and Valentina Castelo Branco	Israel Oliveira dos Santos and William Lages	January 19, 2015
11	11	"Natureza Totalmente Selvagem"	Juliano Enrico and Valentina Castelo Branco	Israel Oliveira dos Santos and William Lages	January 26, 2015
12	12	"Jornada Matinal Implacável"	Arnaldo Branco and Juliano Enrico	Israel Oliveira dos Santos and William Lages	February 2, 2015
13	13	"Aterrorizante Vida Adulta"	Vini Wolf and Juliano Enrico	Israel Oliveira dos Santos and William Lages	February 9, 2015
14	14	"Caneta de 250 Cores"	Juliano Enrico and Daniel Furlan	Gabriel De Moura and William Lages	February 16, 2015
15	15	"Embarque Nessa Onda"	Juliano Enrico and Caíto Mainier	Israel Oliveira dos Santos and William Lages	February 23, 2015
16	16	"Profissão: Palhaço"	Arnaldo Branco and Juliano Enrico	Israel Oliveira dos Santos and William Lages	March 2, 2015
17	17	"Uma Odisseia no Espaço Recreativo"	Juliano Enrico	Tico Bolpas, Diego Lacerda, Flávia Guttler, João Cordoletto, and Douglas Azevedo	September 7, 2015
18	18	"Os Caçadores da Figurinha Perdida"	Arnaldo Branco and Juliano Enrico	Michele Massagli	September 14, 2015
19	19	"Gincana Mortal"	Daniel Furlan and Juliano Enrico	Israel Oliveira dos Santos and William Lages	September 21, 2015
20	20	"Ilha Doideira"	Vini Wolf and Juliano Enrico	Israel Oliveira dos Santos and William Lages	September 28, 2015
21	21	"Os Incríveis Lateenagers"	Arnaldo Branco and Juliano Enrico	Israel Oliveira dos Santos and William Lages	October 5, 2015
22	22	"A Lenda da Mulher de Algodão"	Valentina Castello Branco and Juliano Enrico	Ivan Freire	October 12, 2015
23	23	"Família à Deriva"	Daniel Furlan and Juliano Enrico	Gabriel De Moura and William Lages	October 19, 2015
24	24	"O Pequeno Mestre do Gi Gitsu"	Juliano Enrico and David Benincá	Israel Oliveira dos Santos and William Lages	November 2, 2015
25	25	"Fúria e Poder Sobre Rodas"	Juliano Enrico and Valentina Castello Branco	Israel Oliveira dos Santos and William Lages	November 9, 2015
26	26	"Meu Segundo Amor"	Juliano Enrico, Daniel Furlan and Zé Brandão	Douglas Azevedo, Rodrigo Soldado, Breno Guerreiro, Marcos Vinicios, Tico Bolpas, Luan Hilton and Pedro Ryan	November 16, 2015

=== Season 2 (2016–17) ===
No. overall	No. in season	Title	Written by	Storyboarded by	Original release date
27	1	"Carlos Felino: Conselheiro Amoroso"	Juliano Enrico, Daniel Furlan and Vini Wolf	Vini Wolf	October 10, 2016
28	2	"Fluffy, O Golfinho Assassino"	Juliano Enrico, Caíto Mainier and Daniel Furlan	Israel Oliveira	October 17, 2016
29	3	"Shostners Shopping"	Raul Chequer, Daniel Furlan and Juliano Enrico	Vini Wolf	October 24, 2016
30	4	"Consequência ou Consequência?"	Valentina Castello Branco, Daniel Furlan and Juliano Enrico	Rodolpho Valdetaro	November 7, 2016
31	5	"Através do Guarda-Roupa"	David Benincá, Daniel Furlan and Juliano Enrico	William Lages	November 14, 2016
32	6	"Excursão Alucinante Sem Freio"	Juliano Enrico, Caíto Mainier and Daniel Furlan	Demian Costa	November 21, 2016
33	7	"A Fantástica Fábrica de Refrigerantes"	Juliano Enrico, Daniel Furlan and Arnaldo Branco	Israel Oliveira	November 28, 2016
34	8	"Acampamento Brutal"	Elena Altheman, Juliano Enrico and Daniel Furlan	Flávia Güttler	December 5, 2016
35	9	"Então é Natal"	Juliano Enrico, Caíto Mainier and Daniel Furlan	Israel Oliveira and Gabriel Franklin	December 12, 2016
36	10	"A Vida Secreta dos Belezitos"	Victor Gáspari Canela, Daniel Furlan and Juliano Enrico	Gabriel Franklin	January 14, 2017
37	11	"M.C. Juju"	Daniel Furlan, Juliano Enrico and Felipe Berlinck	Israel Oliveira and Robson de Jesus	January 16, 2017
38	12	"Embalos de Sábado á Tarde"	David Benincá, Juliano Enrico and Daniel Furlan	Lucas Pelegrineti and Israel Oliveira	January 23, 2017
39	13	"Sucesso Interplanetário"	Raul Chequer, Juliano Enrico and Daniel Furlan	Lucas Pelegrineti	January 30, 2017
40	14	"Maquinito, o Robô Amigo"	Pedro Leite, Juliano Enrico and Daniel Furlan	Gabriel Franklin and Robson de Jesus	July 10, 2017
41	15	"Sedoso Cream Double Cream"	Nigel Goodman, Daniel Furlan and Juliano Enrico	Robson de Jesus	July 17, 2017
42	16	"Shostners Burguer"	Marcus Ferraz, Daniel Furlan and Juliano Enrico	Demian Costa	July 24, 2017
43	17	"Irmão do Nico"	Arthur Warren, Daniel Furlan and Juliano Enrico	Jefferson Bastida	July 31, 2017
44	18	"Perdido no Cinema"	Luciano Sant'Anna, Daniel Furlan and Juliano Enrico	David Mussel	August 7, 2017
45	19	"Adelino Adventure Park"	Felipe Berlinck, Daniel Furlan and Juliano Enrico	Leandro de Mello	August 14, 2017
46	20	"De Volta para o Futuro do Passado"	Valentina Castello Branco, Daniel Furlan and Juliano Enrico	Giovana Guimarães	August 21, 2017
47	21	"Recreio Brutal"	Pedro Leite, Daniel Furlan & Juliano Enrico	Gabriel Franklin	August 28, 2017
48	22	"Em Busca de Liberdade"	Valentina Castello Branco, Daniel Furlan and Juliano Enrico	Gabriel Franklin and Lucas Pelegrineti	September 4, 2017
49	23	"Inimigo Imaginário"	Arnaldo Branco, Daniel Furlan and Juliano Enrico	André Rodrigues and William Lages	September 11, 2017
50	24	"Elefante de Porcelana"	Zé Brandão, Daniel Furlan and Juliano Enrico	André Rodrigues and William Lages	September 18, 2017
51	25	"Dormindo Acordado Dormindo"	David Benincá, Juliano Enrico and Daniel Furlan	Lucas Pelegrineti and Gabriel Franklin	September 25, 2017
52	26	"Eject Especial"	Caito Mainier, Daniel Furlan and Juliano Enrico	Raoni Marqs	October 2, 2017

== Shorts (2017) ==
These shorts were written by David Benincá and storyboarded by Rodrigo Soldado.

No.	Title	Original release date
1	"Perdigotto Show: Cuecas em Chamas"	June 17, 2017
2	"Perdigotto Show: Irmão do Jorel"	July 1, 2017
3	"Perdigotto Show: Edson e Danuza"	July 15, 2017
4	"Perdigotto Show: Jorelovers vs. Jorelete"	July 29, 2017
5	"Perdigotto Show: Steve Magal"	August 12, 2017
