= Haunted Tales for Wicked Kids =

Brazilian animated comedy horror television series

- Genre: Comedy horror; Adventure
- Created by: Victor-Hugo Borges
- Developed by: Fundo Setorial do Audiovisual (Ancine)
- Written by: Vitor Brandt; Pedro Aguilera; Arthur Warren; Guilherme Freitas (season 2); Gustavo Suzuki (season 2); Jasmin Tenucci (season 2); Denis Nielsen (season 2
- Directed by: Victor-Hugo Borges
- Voices of: Charles Emmanuel; Nádia Carvalho; Iara Riça; Oberdan Junior; Luis Sérgio Vieira; Rodrigo Antas
- Country of origin: Brazil
- Original language: Portuguese
- No. of seasons: 2
- No. of episodes: 40

Production
- Production companies: Glaz Entretenimento; Copa Studio; BRDE; FSA; Ancine

Original release
- Network: Cartoon Network Brazil
- Release: 4 March 2013 – 25 April 2016

Haunted Tales for Wicked Kids (Portuguese: Historietas Assombradas para Crianças Malcriadas), or Haunted Tales, is a Brazilian animated television series produced by Cartoon Network Brazil. The series chronicles the adventures of Pepe and his friends in a dark world filled with sinister creatures and monsters.

The series was based on a stop-motion short film of the same name created by Victor-Hugo Borges in 2005.

== Concept and production ==
The series began as a children's horror short film using stop-motion and CGI, which was released in 2005. The short film featured prototype versions of Vó and Marilu and had a very different premise, presenting a grandmother telling stories with scary creatures to help her granddaughter fall asleep, all three being Brazilian legends like the Boitatá, Corpo-Seco and Jurupari. The short film ended up being a success upon its release. Later in 2010, Victor-Hugo Borges revived the concept of the short film with the intention of turning it into a TV series, with a pilot episode being one of the projects selected for the Anima TV contest, a partnership between TV Cultura and TV Brasil aimed at creating new Brazilian animated TV series. The pilot was entirely CGI-based, featuring a boy who would serve as a prototype version of Pepe and had a similar format to the 2005 short film about a child listening to horror stories from his grandmother. According to Victor-Hugo Borges, the new version was inspired by The Twilight Zone. The pilot episode was ultimately not selected to become a TV series, however the project was later completely reworked by Victor-Hugo Borges into a new version in partnership with Copa Studio, which premiered in 2013 on Cartoon Network, aiming for a format more similar to American cartoons.

Despite its initial popularity, the series was cancelled in 2016 after two seasons and a TV movie because Copa Studio shifted its focus to developing other animations like Jorel's Brother.

== Synopsis ==
The series revolves around the adventures of Pepe, a wicked boy who lives in a dark mansion with his grandmother, a witch who works selling artifacts and magic potions cities. She always send her grandson to deliver them. In each episode, Pepe and his friends (Marilu, Roberto, Guto and Gastón) undergo supernatural adventures facing various monsters in the city.

== Characters ==
=== Main ===
- Peperoni Von "Pepe" Kittenberg III (voiced by Charles Emmanuel) - A rude, troublemaking boy with spiky red hair who works as a delivery boy for his grandmother. He is always getting into mischief and causing problems, facing all the monsters and mythical beings that appear in his town, almost always through his fault. Pepe's friends are Marilu, Guto, Gastón and Roberto who often follow in the supernatural adventures. The film reveals that he was separated from his parents as a baby and ended up being adopted by Vó, who was unaware of his past and the existence of his real parents until that moment.
- Ramona Bravaria de Lemornio "Vó" Peperonito (voiced by Nádia Carvalho) - Pepe's adoptive grandmother who takes care of him in her dark mansion. She is a wicked old witch who lives experimenting with their cats and sells potions using his grandson as a delivery boy. It is revealed during the course of the series that she is also the older sister of Morte, the personification of death.
- Maria Lourdes "Marilu" da Silva (voiced by Iara Riça) - Pepe's best friend and partner. She assists Pepe in his supernatural adventures, often getting the group into more trouble before saving the day. Unlike her frieds, she tends to be a friendly, sensitive, innocent, and kind girl who hardly displays any rude or aggressive behavior. She has a crush on Pepe and Mario.
- Guterico "Guto" Flores and Gastón de la Fleur (voiced by Oberdan Junior and Luis Sérgio Vieira) - Conjoined twin brothers who have two heads together on the same body. Guto tends to be nicer while Gastón is mean and rude.
- Beto "Roberto" Massa (voiced by Charles Emmanuel and Rodrigo Antas) - A tall, muscular boy. He studies in the same room with Pepe and his friends despite being slightly larger than them. He is always dressed in a varsity jacket and has a quiff.

=== Recurring ===
- Ramirez - Pepe's pet dog. Ramirez lives with Pepe and Grandma in the mansion, sometimes coming to be of aid to Pepe. Ramirez is black with a white face that resembles the members of the band Kiss.
- Mário (voiced by Luis Sérgio Vieira) - A classmate of Pepe who normally behaves like an opposite of him. He is a smart and polite boy, but his classmates never take him seriously and he tends to be the most neglected in the class.
- Ritinha - Another classmate of Pepe and his friends. She is a poor, short-sighted girl who has huge glasses and is quite naive.
- The Cats - They are Pepe's grandmother's servants. They work helping her or serving as guinea pigs in the preparation of potions and sometimes they are butlers.
- The Mayor - The mayor of the city who is a living puppet controlled by his bodyguard who carries him everywhere. He has a tyrannical son called Tchithero.
- Cacá - A minor boy who is a classmate of Pepe and his friends. He rarely appears or speaks and has a hole in his head with a pair of visible eyes that are from his brain.
- The Bard - He is a minstrel who dresses in character and is always carrying and playing a banjo, despite having no talent on that instrument. He was notably seen making a pact with the Devil in one of the episodes of the first season which led to him being a central character in one of the episodes of the second season where he becomes temporarily famous.
- Santa Claus - Christmas figure who is responsible for delivering gifts to well-behaved children and coal to naughty children. He is an old friend of Pepe's grandmother.
- Pandora - A one-time character, a serious and astute girl who frequently changes schools and carries with her a lunch box in which a shadow that represents all evil inhabits. Pepe has a platonic and reciprocated love for her.

=== Antagonists ===
- Vanda/Loira do Banheiro - An evil woman who had her spirit trapped in a mirror in a women's bathroom. She tricks girls into turning them into dolls and adding them to her collection. She was Granny's enemy in high school and got trapped in the mirror by one of her spells. She is based on the Brazilian urban legend of the same name inspired by the Bloody Mary.
- Morte - A personification of death who is Pepe's grandmother's younger sister. She has the appearance of an attractive red-haired young woman who is a biker and often go through portals to find and take the deceased people. She has a rivalry with her older sister in addition to being dyslexic, often confusing what she is going to say.
- Pepita - An evil female counterpart of Pepe after he put a magical wig that took over his body, her initial goal was to force her friends to like the girl show "Unicórnias Princesas", which Pepe secretly watches. She returns in season two helping to defeat the evil Marilus.
- Jack Hunter - A ruthless monster hunter who has a strong hatred and prejudice against monsters. Originally a host of a TV show Pepe adored, he constantly hunted down and trapped all the monsters he encountered until Pepe discovered that Jack was the real villain who hated monsters just for existing.
- Homem-Anta - Literally "Tapir Man", is a mysterious student at the school Pepe and his friends attend. He lives in a prison-like detention room area and has never been seen without his mask. He is jealous of the other students and always sneaks out on photo day to ruin their appearances.
- The Devil - The boss of hell and prince of darkness. Despite being considered evil, he is portrayed as a sensitive and suffering middle-aged man who tries to be a good person. He constantly arranges things for people in exchange for their souls.
- Sérgio - A mutated turtle that was previously Mário's pet turtle. He was turned into a mutant by Pepe using one of his grandmother's machines in an attempt to turn him into a nice guy, but ended up accidentally turning him into a sensitive, authoritarian and annoying adult. He has 3 clones that together make a parody of the Teenage Mutant Ninja Turtles.
- Kumo Tatchi - A spirit of a Japanese masseuse who has the ability to create small ghosts by massaging each person, leaving them so calm and carefree that they cannot do anything else. She has a dream of becoming a karaoke singer, despite having a terrible voice.
- Bhutumu - A gargantuan monster who appeared during the final episode of the first season. He's said to be the one who will bring the apocalypse to the earth, however it was only a bedtime story Grandmother told her grandson, teaching him that he should finish anything he started. Bhutumu is based on Cthulhu.
- Vó and Morte's parents - An immortal couple who have appearances similar to black and white 1930s cartoons and speak in European Portuguese. The mother does not have a good relationship with her daughter being extremely strict and rejecting the fact that she became a witch, despite hiding that she was also a witch.
- Zalatristhe - An intellectual and lonely zombie who has vast intelligence from all the brains he has eaten over the years, but regrets having such intelligence that it prevents him from being happy.
- Evil Marilus - Two versions of Marilu that exist inside her and represent all the hidden evil feelings hidden inside her, one represents her rude side and the other her aggressive side. They free themselves after Marilu finds a house of magic mirrors and take her place, but they return to the mirror with the help of Pepita. In an alternate future it is revealed that they return as dictators.

== Episodes ==
Series	Episodes	Originally released	
Series	Episodes	First released	Last released
Pilot	1	10 January 2010	
1	14	4 March 2013	25 December 2013
2	26	1 July 2015	25 April 2016

=== Pilot ===
No.	Title	Written by	Storyboarded by	Original release date
0	"O Inventor" "The Inventor"	Vitor-Hugo Borges & Fábio Henckel	Jozz	13 January 2010 (online)

=== Season 1 (2013) ===
No. overall	No. in season	Title	Storyboarded by	Original release date	US airdate
1	1	"A Loira do Banheiro" "The Blondie from the Bathroom / Bloody Mary"	Kico & David Mussel	4 March 2013	3 April 2013
2	2	"O Globo da Morte... da Morte!" "Death's Globe.. of the Death!"	Rodrigo "Soldado" & Rosaria	4 March 2013	TBA
3	3	"Unicórnias Princesas" "Princesses Unicorns"	Rodrigo "Soldado" & David Mussel	11 March 2013	TBA
4	4	"O Túnel do Amor" "The Tunnel of Love"	Rodrigo "Soldado", David Mussel & Mauricio Maia	11 March 2013	TBA
5	5	"O Pombisomem" "The Pingeonman"	Rodrigo "Soldado", Márcio de Castro & William Lages	18 March 2013	TBA
6	6	"O Anta-gonista" "The Tapir-gonist"	Rodrigo "Soldado", Márcio de Castro, William Lages & David Mussel	18 March 2013	TBA
7	7	"Os Pepenautas do Caribe" "The Pepenauts of the Caribbean"	Rodrigo "Soldado" & Rosaria	25 March 2013	TBA
8	8	"Pobre Diabo" "Poor Devil"	Kico & David Mussel	25 March 2013	TBA
9	9	"Como o Pepe Arruinou o Natal" "How Pepe Ruined the Christmas"	Kico & David Mussel	25 December 2013	TBA
10	10	"Sérgio" "Sergio"	Rodrigo "Soldado" & Rosaria	1 April 2013	TBA
11	11	"Nas Montanhas-Russas da Loucura" "At the Roller Coaster of Madness"	Kico & David Mussel	8 April 2013	TBA
12	12	"Kumo Tatchi" "Kumo Tachi"	Rodrigo "Soldado" & Rosaria	8 April 2013	TBA
13	13	"Smells Like Teen Spirit" "Smells Like Teen Spirit"	Rodrigo "Soldado" & Rosaria	15 April 2013	TBA
14	14	"O Fim do Mundo!" "The End of the World"	Kico, David Mussel, Rodrigo "Soldado" & Rosaria	15 April 2013	TBA

=== Season 2 (2015–16) ===
No. overall	No. in season	Title	Storyboarded by	Original release date
15	1	"O Inimímico" "The Enemymic"	Gabriel de Moura	1 June 2015
16	2	"Pepe e Marilu na Convenção de Monstros" "Pepe and Marilu in the Monsters Convention"	Giovanna Guimarães	8 June 2015
17	3	"A Tirania de Tchitchero" "The Tyranny of Tchitchero"	William Lages	15 June 2015
18	4	"Monstro Adorado da Piscina" "Pool's Beloved Monster"	Gabriel de Moura	22 June 2015
19	5	"Catarino" "Catarrhino"	Israel Oliveira dos Santos	29 June 2015
20	6	"Os 1001 Pedidos" "the 1001 applications"	Daniel Hodge	6 July 2015
21	7	"Tal Mãe, Tal Vó" "Like Mother, Like Grandmother"	Israel Oliveira dos Santos	13 July 2015
22	8	"Quem Tem Curativo, Tem Medo" "Who Has Dressing Afraid"	David Mussel	20 July 2015
23	9	"A Culpa é Sempre do Mordomo" "Blame is Always the Butler"	Márcio de Castro	27 July 2015
24	10	"Top Bruxa" "Top Witch"	Israel Oliveira dos Santos	3 August 2015
25	11	"Além da Muralha" "Beyond the Wall"	Gabriel de Moura	10 August 2015
26	12	"A Minhoca Carismática" "The Charismatic Worm"	Daniel Hodge	17 August 2015
27	13	"Trem da Alegria" "Gravy Train"	David Mussel	24 August 2015
28	14	"O Totem da Sabedoria" "The Totem of Wisdom"	Giovanna Guimarães	1 February 2016
29	15	"Detenção de la Detencíon" "Arrest her detención"	Daniel Hodge	8 February 2016
30	16	"O Pêlo em que Habito" "The Hair in I Live"	David Mussel	15 February 2016
31	17	"Assim Falou Zalatristhe" "Thus Spake Zalatristhe"	Israel Oliveira dos Santos	22 February 2016
32	18	"Cáren, A Estranha" "Caren, The Strange"	Giovanna Guimarães	29 February 2016
33	19	"A Lancheira de Pandora" "The Lunch Box of Pandora"	William Lages	7 March 2016
34	20	"Faroeste Cachorro" "Western Dog"	Giovanna Guimarães	14 March 2016
35	21	"Múmia do Amor" "Mummy Love"	Marcio de Castro	21 March 2016
36	22	"Fofinha é a Mãe" "Sweetie is Mother"	Daniel Hodge	28 March 2016
37	23	"Macaco do Enigma" "Monkey Puzzle"	Gabriel de Moura	4 April 2016
38	24	"Bardo: Do Anonimato á Fama" "Bard: From Anonymity will Fame"	David Mussel	11 April 2016
39	25	"Sino do Tempo - Parte 1" "Time bell - Part 1"	Gabriel de Moura	18 April 2016
40	26	"Sino do Tempo - Parte 2" "Time bell - Part 2"	Israel Oliveira dos Santos	25 April 2016

== Film adaptation ==
On 2 November 2017, Copa Studio, Vitrine Filmes and Glaz Entretenimento presented a film adaptation based on the show that released in cinemas, titled "Historietas Assombradas - O Filme" (lit. Haunted Tales: The Movie). When Pepe discovers that he is adopted and that his parents are alive, he decides to go out on a quest in search of them.

== Release ==
A total of 40 episodes were produced and originally broadcast on Cartoon Network Brazil from 4 March 2013, to 25 April 2016. In its debut, the series was the most watched animated series on the channel, surpassing even the channel's original productions.

The series has also been broadcast on other channels, such as Tooncast and Cartoon Network in Latin America.

It is expected to debut worldwide after being acquired by 9 Story Entertainment for distribution.
