= Nádia Carvalho =

Brazilian actress (1955–2022)

- Born: Nádia de Almeida Carvalho; 16 April 1955; Rio de Janeiro, Brazil
- Died: 11 July 2022 (aged 67); Rio de Janeiro, Brazil
- Occupation: Actress
- Spouse: Nizo Neto (m. 1984–1989)

Nádia de Almeida Carvalho (16 April 1955 – 11 July 2022) was a Brazilian actress.

== Career ==
Nádia became well known as an actress mainly for her role as Santinha Pureza in Escolinha do Professor Raimundo. She also appeared in several other television programs, including Caso Verdade, Tele-Tema, Chico Anysio Show, Sítio do Pica-Pau Amarelo, Memórias de Amor, Memórias de um Gigolô, and Zorra Total. In 2005, she made a special guest appearance on Sítio do Pica-Pau Amarelo.

During the 1970s and 1980s, she appeared in several stage productions directed by Luis Mendonça, including the revue shows Rio de Cabo a Rabo, O Último dos Nukupirus, and A Tocha na América. Still in the 1980s, she also took part in the production Sem Sutiã - Uma Revista Feminista and in the children's musical Tistú - O Menino do Dedo Verde.

== Death ==
Nádia died on 11 July 2022 in Rio de Janeiro, a few days after suffering a severe stroke.

== Awards and nominations ==
Award	Year	Recipient(s) and nominee(s)	Category	Result	Ref.
Prêmio Yamato (Yamato Awards)	2005	Edna Mode, in The Incredibles	Melhor Dubladora de Coadjuvante (Best Supporting Voice Actress)	Nominated	
Prêmio Yamato (Yamato Awards)	2007	Desperate Housewives	Narração ou Locução (Best Narration or Voice-over)	Won	

== Filmography ==
=== Television ===
Year	Title	Role	Notes	Ref.
1979	Memórias de Amor	Melica		
1979	Sítio do Pica-Pau Amarelo (1977)	Rosinha	"Emília, Romeu e Julieta"	
1982	Caso Verdade	Younger Sister Dulce (Note: Free translation of "Irmã Dulce jovem")	The Irmã Dulce case	
1982	Chico Anysio Show	—N/a		
1984	Rabo de Saia	Florência		
1990	Escolinha do Professor Raimundo	Dona Santinha Pureza		
1991	Estados Anysios de Chico City	—N/a		
2005	Sítio do Pica-Pau Amarelo (2001)	Gláucia		

== Voice work ==
=== Dubbing ===
==== Animations ====
List of animated characters dubbed by Nádia Carvalho in Brazilian Portuguese
Role	Apparitions	Ref.
Mrs. Martha Moppet	The Little Lulu Show	
Edna Mode	The Incredibles and Incredibles 2	
Lin Beifong	The Legend of Korra	
Granny	Ice Age: Continental Drift and Ice Age: Collision Course	

==== Actresses ====
List of actresses and roles dubbed in Brazilian Portuguese by Nádia Carvalho
Actress	Role	Apparitions	Ref.
Daphne Reid	Vivian Banks	The Fresh Prince of Bel-Air	
Carmen Salinas	Agripina Perez	María la del Barrio	
Alexandra Tydings	Aphrodite	Xena: Warrior Princess and Hercules: The Legendary Journeys	

=== Original voice ===
Role	Apparitions	Ref.
Ramona Bravaria de Lemornio "Vó" Peperonito	Historietas Assombradas para Crianças Malcriadas	
