= Jorel's Brother =

Brazilian animated television series

- Genre: Slapstick; Surreal comedy; Satire
- Created by: Juliano Enrico
- Directed by: Juliano Enrico; Rodrigo Soldado
- Voices of: Andrei Duarte; Juliano Enrico; César Marchetti; Tânia Gaidarji; Cecília Lemes; Melissa Garcia; Hugo Picchi Neto
- Theme music composer: Chico Cuíca; Daniel Furlan; Fabio Mozine; Juliano Enrico
- Opening theme: "Irmão do Jorel"
- Composers: Ruben Feffer; Vicente Falek
- Country of origin: Brazil
- Original language: Portuguese
- No. of seasons: 5
- No. of episodes: 127 (list of episodes)

Production
- Executive producers: Vivian Amadio; Halina Agapejev
- Producers: Zé Brandão; Felipe Tavares
- Running time: 11 minutes
- Production companies: TV Quase; Copa Studio; Cartoon Network LA Original Productions

Original release
- Network: Cartoon Network
- Release: September 22, 2014 – present

Jorel's Brother (Portuguese: Irmão do Jorel) is a Brazilian animated television series created by Juliano Enrico and produced by TV Quase and Copa Studio for Cartoon Network Brazil since 2012. The series debuted on September 22, 2014, and is notable for being the first animated production exclusively produced by Cartoon Network Latin America (although their first very original production was the short series Santo vs The Clones), in which was confirmed that the show premiered in the region on February 2, 2015 and in Germany on November 10, 2016 on Cartoon Network.

On December 8, 2015, it was announced that Jorel's Brother had been renewed for a second season. On May 25, 2017, the series was renewed for a third season. On September 24, 2020, the series was picked up for distribution rights by Cake Entertainment. On December 7, 2024, the series was renewed for a fifth season.

== Plot ==
The series shows the daily life of an eccentric and extravagant family. Jorel is the middle child, with silky hair and a sweet and attractive way to win girls, which makes him the most popular guy in town. However, the show does not revolve around him, but around his younger brother, a shy and nameless boy just called "Jorel's Brother". Being overshadowed by the fame and popularity of his older brother, Jorel's Brother tries to gain his own identity and be someone important in the family. Each situation revolves around a typical confusion set in a Brazilian family atmosphere, amid surreal and nonsense adventures, always from the perspective of Jorel's Brother.

== Characters ==
=== Main ===
- Jorel's Brother (voiced by Andrei Duarte): A small, cowardly and naive 8-year-old boy with curly hair and crooked teeth. He is the youngest son of the family who seeks his own identity and tries to be popular, like his older brother Jorel. Despite his efforts, he always returns to his original status of an ordinary kid at the end of every episode. Jorel's Brother's real name was never revealed on the show.
- Jorel (voiced by Juliano Enrico): Jorel's Brother's elder brother. With an athletic physique, a calm personality, and long silky hair, he is regarded as the pride of the family, loved by all the girls and the most popular kid in the neighborhood. He always wins and gets to be the center of attention. Jorel's Brother tries to be as popular as him, but he lives to fail. His voice was never revealed on the show.
- Mr. Edson (voiced by César Marchetti): Jorel's father. He is a neurotic father who dedicates his spare time to the revolutionary theater and conceptual cinema. He's always giving his children advice based on his crazy life experiences.
- Mrs. Danuza (voiced by Tânia Gaidarji): Jorel's mother. She is an active, athletic woman, and a former Olympic champion on several modalities. She's constantly concerned about her children's well-being.
- Granny Gigi (voiced by Cecília Lemes): Maternal grandmother of Jorel. She's a sarcastic old lady who's tough and has a strange lollipop-sucking obsession. When she was younger, she performed dangerous and daring stunts in action movies with famous actor Steve Magal.
- Granny Juju (voiced by Melissa Garcia): Paternal grandmother of Jorel. She is the opposite of Granny Gigi, a calm old lady who's gentle with her grandchildren, especially with Jorel's Brother. She takes care of ducks and flowers as a hobby.
- Nico (voiced by Hugo Picchi Neto): Eldest son of the family, older brother of Jorel and Jorel's Brother. Nico's face is always covered by his long bangs because his face is said to be deformed due to a tricycle accident. He's the drummer of a rock band that appears out of nowhere and starts playing during episodes.
- Lara (voiced by Melissa Garcia): A playful, loud and cheery girl, Jorel's Brother's best friend. She likes taking part in his adventures and always interrupts, when someone is about to say Jorel's Brother's true name, by screaming and calling him by his nickname, making her somewhat of a recurring gag on the show. (seasons 1–2; recurring season 3–present)

=== Recurring ===
- Tosh (voiced by Hugo Picchi Neto): Jorel's Brother's talking Border Terrier.
- Ana Catarina (voiced by Melissa Garcia): The beautiful girl from Jorel's Brother's school. She is Jorel's Brother's crush.
- Samantha (voiced by Jussara Marques): The giant green girl from Jorel's Brother's school who's a bully.
- Steve Magal (voiced by Hugo Picchi Neto): Jorel's Brother's favorite action hero.
- Rose (voiced by Cecília Lemes): A giant octopus who is the maid in Jorel's home.
- Gesonel (voiced by Hugo Picchi Neto): Granny Juju's white duck. It's the family's very own master of disguises.
- Danúbio (voiced by César Marchetti): Granny Juju's green duck.
- Fabrício (voiced by Cássius Romero): Granny Juju's black duck.

== Episodes ==
Season	Episodes	Originally released	
Season	Episodes	First released	Last released
1	26	September 22, 2014	November 16, 2015
2	26	October 10, 2016	October 2, 2017
3	26	July 16, 2018	June 24, 2019
4	26	April 2, 2021	January 27, 2022
5	23	October 18, 2024	May 16, 2025

== In other media ==
Jorel's Brother makes a cameo in the OK K.O.! Let's Be Heroes episode "Crossover Nexus".

== Awards and nominations ==
Year	Award	Category	Nominee(s)	Result	Ref.
2019	Quirino Awards	Best Ibero-American Animation Series	Jorel's Brother	Won	
2019	Rio2C (Rio Creative Conference)	Audience Award - Best Brazilian Audiovisual series of 2018	Jorel's Brother	Won	
2019	Grande Prêmio do Cinema Brasileiro	Best Brazilian Animated Series	Jorel's Brother	Won	
2019	International Emmy Kids Awards	Best Animation	Jorel's Brother	Nominated	
