= List of OK K.O.! Let's Be Heroes episodes =

OK K.O.! Let's Be Heroes (also known simply as OK K.O.!) is an American superhero comedy animated series created by Ian Jones-Quartey (known for his work on Adventure Time, Steven Universe, Secret Mountain Fort Awesome, and nockFORCE) and based on his pilot short Lakewood Plaza Turbo, which was released as part of Cartoon Network's 2013 Summer Shorts project. On December 7, 2017, show creator Ian Jones-Quartey confirmed via Twitter that a second season had been greenlit. The show was renewed for a third season in 2019, and it was confirmed that it would be the series' last following the show's cancellation.

The series concluded on September 6, 2019, after three seasons and 112 episodes.

== Series overview ==
Season	Episodes	Originally released	
Season	Episodes	First released	Last released
Pilot		May 21, 2013	
Webisodes	13	February 4, 2016	August 2, 2017
1	52	August 1, 2017	April 6, 2018
2	40	March 19, 2018	June 30, 2019
3	20	July 7, 2019	September 6, 2019

=== Pilot (2013) ===
Title	Directed by	Written and storyboarded by	Original release date	Prod. code
"Lakewood Plaza Turbo"	Phil Rynda (creative), Sue Mondt (art), and Robert Alvarez (timing)	Ian Jones-Quartey	May 21, 2013	501-238 (Note: The production code was revealed in the series in the episode, “Let’s Watch the Pilot”.)
K.O., Rad, and Enid investigate to find out who sprayed graffiti on Lakewood Plaza's sign after being told to by their boss and owner of Gar's Bodega, Mr. Gar.

=== Precursor webisodes (2016–17) ===
Note: K.O. is voiced by Stephanie Nadolny. Each short episode is animated by different animation studios, such as Science Saru and Yotta. Most of the webisodes could only be watched using the Cartoon Network app, while some could be watched with YouTube.

No.	Title	Animation direction by	Written and storyboarded by	Production company	Original release date	Prod. code
1	"K.O."	Abel Góngora and Juan Manuel Laguna	Toby Jones and Stu Livingston	Science Saru	February 4, 2016	501-238-001
K.O. learns a new power move called "The Slide Kick" and eventually it gets out of control.
2	"Enid"	Greg Sharp	Ian Jones-Quartey	Rubber House	February 5, 2016	501-238-002
Rad and K.O. accidentally destroy Enid's counter which she uses for her job.
3	"Rad"	Jake Ganz and Max Collins	Victor Courtright	Yotta	February 6, 2016	501-238-003
Rad discovers that his "super-cool power-up" is cuteness.
4	"Carol"	Abel Góngora and Juan Manuel Laguna	Ryann Shannon	Science Saru	December 13, 2016	1044-503S
K.O. makes a documentary of a day in the life of his karate master mom, Carol.
5	"Enid's Bad Day"	Jake Ganz	Mira Ongchua	Yotta	December 22, 2016	1044-501S
When rowdy customers annoy Enid, she unleashes a soul-sucking vortex.
6	"Barrels and Crates"	Jake Ganz	Parker Simmons	Yotta	December 25, 2016	1044-505S
K.O. uses his fighting skills to break every crate and barrel in the store's warehouse as per Mr. Gar's order.
7	"Rad Cries"	Byeongsan Park	Parker Simmons	MUA Film	December 29, 2016	1044-502S
K.O. shows Rad and Enid a video of a dog laying on a stakeboard which makes Rad cry.
8	"Rad's Van"	Abel Góngora and Juan Manuel Laguna	Ryann Shannon	Science Saru	January 1, 2017	1044-506S
K.O. accidentally breaks a part of Rad's van when he brings it to work.
9	"Commercial"	Jake Ganz	Mira Ongchua	Yotta	May 3, 2017	1044-504S
A commercial featuring K.O., Enid, Rad and Mr. Gar is shown on TV.
10	"Power-Up!!!"	Jake Ganz	Stevie Borbolla	Yotta	May 3, 2017	1044-507S
Rad gains a new power that makes everything he does happen 3 times.
11	"Dendy"	Joe Apel	Toby Jones	Cartoon Network Studios	May 3, 2017	1044-508S
Dendy shows K.O. that she doesn't need an imagination and that she can do it in real life.
12	"Boxmore Infomercial"	Megan Kuck	Ryann Shannon and Parker Simmons	Powerhouse Animation	May 3, 2017	1044-510S
An infomercial featuring Lord Boxman is shown.
13	"Let's Do It Together!"	Rob Getshyman	Hiroyuki Imaishi (intro sequence)	Digital eMation (intro sequence)	August 2, 2017	1044-509S
A look through the history of production for Lakewood Plaza Turbo and later OK K.O.! Let's Be Heroes, set to an extended version of the theme song. Clips from the original pilot, mobile app, console game, behind-the-scenes footage and the final opening sequence of the series.

== Episodes ==
Note: The order of the episodes are presented by the intended order list specified by executive producer Toby Jones and were listed accordingly on HBO Max. This does not reflect the order in which they initially aired.

=== Season 1 (2017–18) ===
No. overall	No. in season	Title	Animation direction by	Written and storyboarded by	Original release date	Prod. code	U.S viewers (millions)
1	1	"Let's Be Heroes" (Part 1)	Hwang Ki-hoo	Geneva Hodgson and Mira Ongchua	August 1, 2017 (Note: This episode was first released online on June 13, 2017.)	1044-005	1.35
K.O. aspires to be the greatest hero ever. When he arrives at Lakewood Plaza Turbo with his mom and former champion Carol, he is drawn to Gar's Bodega, run by the powerful Mr. Gar and his two employees Rad and Enid.
2	2	"Let's Be Friends!" (Part 2)	Chang-woo Shin	Ryann Shannon and Parker Simmons	August 1, 2017	1044-006	1.35
K.O. wants to become friends with Enid and Rad and get hired at Lakewood Plaza Turbo, so to make them proud he decides to invade Boxmore and take on Lord Boxman himself.
3	3	"You're Everybody's Sidekick"	Sunjae Lee and Byungjae Oh	Dave Alegre and Haewon Lee	August 1, 2017	1044-007	1.25
K.O. is surprised to see Enid show a lack of empathy, so he sets out to assist everyone at Lakewood Plaza Turbo to prove helping others is always worth it. Things get complicated when he tries to help Red Action and her crew.
4	4	"We Messed Up"	Sunjae Lee and Byungjae Oh	Stevie Borbolla and Danny Ducker	August 1, 2017	1044-004	1.23
After being told not to go into Mr. Gar's office, K.O., Rad and Enid go anyway, and accidentally break one of Mr. Gar's prized possessions: a photo of K.O.'s mom, Carol.
5	5	"Jethro's All Yours"	Chang-woo Shin	Ryann Shannon and Parker Simmons	August 2, 2017	1044-002	1.20
K.O. gets his first solo mission: fighting Jethro, whom Rad and the rest dub "simple" enough for the new hero. When K.O. realizes the monotony of facing him, he begins to doubt himself.
6	6	"You're Level 100"	Hwang Ki-hoo	Stevie Borbolla and Danny Ducker	August 2, 2017	1044-009	1.04
When K.O. finally gets a Pow Card, it reads level 100, which causes him to become a celebrity. In light of the commotion, Lord Boxman sends Mega Darrell to face K.O. in order to prove his worth.
7	7	"I Am Dendy"	Hwang Ki-hoo	Geneva Hodgson and Mira Ongchua	August 3, 2017	1044-008	1.01
K.O. meets Dendy - a girl that sits behind him in school - who asks for his help in retrieving items for her backpack. Unbeknownst to him, Dendy is really testing K.O. and his capabilities of being a hero.
8	8	"Plaza Shorts"	Hwang Ki-hoo	Haewon Lee and Dave Alegre	March 5, 2018 (Note: This episode was first released online on November 28, 2017.)	1044-003	0.61
K.O. expresses his thoughts as he tries to be a hero; Butt-kicking Dynamite Watkins from News 52's Action News Team reports on an exciting day at Gar's; Lord Boxman creates a video on how Darrells are made; K.O., Rad, and Enid try to figure out the mysterious adventure Mr. Gar keeps holo-phoning from; Enid and Rad both think the other one has it easy, and they switch jobs to prove it.
9	9	"Sibling Rivalry"	Hwang Ki-hoo	Dave Alegre and Haewon Lee	August 3, 2017	1044-011	1.22
Lord Boxman unleashes Raymond, a vain, pretty-boy robot with sports-based powers, who defeats the heroes and takes a letter of Gar's Bodega. When Rad and Enid can't get along, K.O. teams up with Darrell and Shannon to get the letter back.
10	10	"You Get Me"	Hwang Ki-hoo	Geneva Hodgson and Mira Ongchua	August 7, 2017 (Note: This episode was first released online on August 4, 2017.)	1044-010	0.79
Enid gets turned to stone by a Wizard because he believes she displayed rude behavior towards him. K.O. tries his best to turn her back to normal, as he thinks he is the only one who can because he "gets her".
11	11	"Do You Have Any More in the Back?"	Chang-woo Shin	Ryann Shannon and Parker Simmons	August 4, 2017	1044-016	1.30
Rad claims to know everything, which impresses K.O. and annoys Enid. However, his knowledge is put to the test when the group must venture into the mysterious backroom.
12	12	"Just Be a Pebble"	Hwang Ki-hoo	Geneva Hodgson and Mira Ongchua	August 9, 2017	1044-001	0.79
K.O. is tired of being small, so Rad gives him a candy bar that can increase his size. However, K.O. soon realizes that being big isn't all it's cracked up to be, when he accidentally hurls Mr. Gar's car keys in the sewer while trying to help him (due to his increased size), and must shrink to be able to retrieve them.
13	13	"Presenting Joe Cuppa"	Sunjae Lee, Byungjae Oh, and Eunyung Byun	Stevie Borbolla and Danny Ducker	August 10, 2017	1044-015	0.91
Joe Cuppa, Lakewood Plaza Turbo's local comedian, is all washed up and jobless. K.O., Rad and an unenthusiastic Enid try to help by hiring him to work at Gar's, which is just in time for Shannon's attack on the Bodega.
14	14	"My Dad Can Beat Up Your Dad!"	Hwang Ki-hoo	Dave Alegre and Haewon Lee	August 4, 2017	1044-012	1.16
K.O. gets into a verbal fight with Chameleon Jr. ending in a rendezvous between their parents. While Carol tries to resolve things peacefully, Chameleon Sr. isn't so willing.
15	15	"We've Got Pests"	Sunjae Lee, Byungjae Oh, and Eunyung Byun	Stevie Borbolla and Danny Ducker	August 14, 2017 (Note: This episode was first released online on August 11, 2017.)	1044-014	1.16
K.O. and Rad must run the Bodega and take care of themselves while Enid hangs out with 3 tiny pest-like self proclaimed cool kids that break in through the pipes.
16	16	"You Are Rad"	Chang-woo Shin	Ryann Shannon and Parker Simmons	August 8, 2017	1044-013	0.72
When K.O. forgets his name tag, Rad lets him use his, resulting in everyone thinking K.O. is Rad. Along the way, K.O. discovers some personal things about Rad causing him to think that there's more to him than he puts off.
17	17	"Legends of Mr. Gar"	Hwang Ki-hoo	Dave Alegre and Haewon Lee	August 15, 2017	1044-033	0.84
Rad and Enid reminisce about when they started working at the Bodega, and discovered how amazing Mr. Gar really is. Later, Crinkly Wrinkly barges in to tell the tale of the Plaza's origin.
18	18	"We Got Hacked"	Hwang Ki-hoo	Dave Alegre and Haewon Lee	October 27, 2017 (Note: This episode was first released online on October 2, 2017.)	1044-019	0.89
While trying to fix a malfunctioned mop, K.O. clicks a pop-up on Dendy's "hackpack", causing a glitch virus to invade the Bodega and infect shoppers into glitched CGI zombies.
19	19	"Plazalympics"	Hwang Ki-hoo	Geneva Hodgson and Mira Ongchua	October 20, 2017	1044-018	0.89
K.O. takes part in Lakewood Plaza Turbo's annual Plazalympics competition, and is excited to be on a team with his friends. However, when he steps out for a second to use the restroom, Mr. Gar chooses Mega Football Baby to be on Rad and Enid's team over him. Paired with Colewart and Potato, K.O. must help defeat the team of Boxmore robots that drop in to win the key to the Plaza!
20	20	"We're Captured"	Chang-woo Shin	Ryann Shannon and Parker Simmons	August 17, 2017	1044-017	0.98
Boxman captures K.O., Enid and Rad, but must juggle torturing his captors with making sure his client, Professor Venomous, and Venomous' assistant, Fink, have a great dinner and are still interested in doing business with him.
21	21	"Know Your Mom"	Chang-woo Shin	Ryann Shannon and Parker Simmons	August 16, 2017	1044-020	1.05
After some misdirection from Brandon, K.O. decides to reunite Carol with one of her archenemies for Mother's Day.: Special Guest: Jonathan Davis as Succulentus
22	22	"Face Your Fears"	Hwang Ki-hoo	Dave Alegre and Haewon Lee	August 21, 2017 (Note: This episode was first released online on August 18, 2017.)	1044-023	0.76
Mr. Gar gets challenged to try the latest arcade game "Face Your Fears". When he gets stuck in the game, along with Rad and Enid, Dendy aids K.O. in entering the game to save his friends.
23	23	"Everybody Likes Rad?"	Sunjae Lee, Byungjae Oh, and Eunyung Byun	Geneva Hodgson and Mira Ongchua	August 22, 2017	1044-026	0.60
Rad posts a video of himself falling through the roof of the Bodega after a failed rocket launch. The video becomes a hit, but everyone just wants to hear him say "Blorp".
24	24	"You Have to Care"	Hwang Ki-hoo	Stevie Borbolla and Danny Ducker	August 23, 2017	1044-021	0.84
P.O.I.N.T. Academy superstar Elodie arrives at the Bodega to adoring crowds. Enid holds a grudge against her due to a traumatic event that happened in their youth, and must set the record straight.
25	25	"Plaza Prom"	Sunjae Lee and Byungjae Oh	Stevie Borbolla and Danny Ducker	August 24, 2017	1044-022	0.74
When Rad throws his own prom at the Plaza, K.O. tries to make sure it goes off without a hitch. However, this turns out to be easier said than done as Rad's cousin's "Party Scroll" seems to make things terrible. When Raymond drops in, K.O. must think fast to save the party and Rad's reputation!
26	26	"T.K.O."	Hwang Ki-hoo and Chang-woo Shin	Geneva Hodgson and Mira Ongchua	September 4, 2017	1044-024	1.08
27	27	"T.K.O."	Hwang Ki-hoo and Chang-woo Shin	Ryann Shannon and Parker Simmons	September 4, 2017	1044-025	1.08
Searching for power and tired of being talked down to, K.O. accepts the help of a shady robed man who calls himself the Shadowy Figure. He leads K.O. into the forest, where he reveals that the young hero holds a powerful demon inside of him to be summoned through pure anger; dubbed T.K.O. Once successfully transformed, the new Turbo K.O. and his power is a shock to everybody. When he is irked too far and begins to destroy everything and one in his path, the other heroes of the Plaza must band together to stop him.: Note: This episode is the series' first 22-minute special, and as such, it counts as 2 episodes.
28	28	"Stop Attacking the Plaza"	Sunjae Lee and Byungjae Oh	Stevie Borbolla and Danny Ducker	September 8, 2017	1044-028	0.77
Lord Boxman's main investor, Cosma, threatens to pull her funding if he continues to attack the Plaza instead of building robots as he is supposed to. While Boxman thinks he can manage, he has trouble admitting to his problem and ends up going cold turkey.
29	29	"We've Got Fleas"	Hwang Ki-hoo	Geneva Hodgson and Mira Ongchua	September 15, 2017	1044-032	0.87
Mikayla, a new animalistic robot, arrives to attack the plaza. K.O., Enid and Rad have Crinkly Wrinkly bite them so that they can become were-animals and take on their new opponent. Unfortunately, they can't seem to change back.
30	30	"One Last Score"	Chang-woo Shin	Dave Alegre and Haewon Lee	September 1, 2017	1044-037	0.94
K.O. decides to help Ginger recapture her glory days as a candy thief by helping her "borrow" a youth restoring confection in a heist.
31	31	"Second First Date"	Hwang Ki-hoo	Geneva Hodgson and Mira Ongchua	September 1, 2017	1044-030	0.94
Love is in the air and Cupid arrives to resolve romantic tension between Rad and Enid. With his all-remembering eye, he transports the main trio to a flashback of Rad and Enid's failed first date; prompting them to go on a retake.
32	32	"No More Pow Cards"	Sunjae Lee, Byungjae Oh, and Suhong Kim	Stevie Borbolla and Danny Ducker	September 22, 2017	1044-034	0.78
When K.O. realizes Pow Cards exclude Dendy due to her Kappa heritage, he’s devastated by the discrimination and the two become determined to change it.
33	33	"Let's Watch the Pilot"	Hwang Ki-hoo	Ryann Shannon, Parker Simmons, and Ian Jones-Quartey	February 19, 2018 (Note: This episode was first released online on December 1, 2017.)	1044-027	0.83
In this fourth wall-breaking episode, Dynamite Watkins shows K.O., Rad, and Enid the original pitch pilot for the series, Lakewood Plaza Turbo, on a talk show (which she sabotaged from Crinkly Wrinkly). However, the "actors" are embarrassed by their first outing, causing tensions to rise.
34	34	"A Hero's Fate"	Hwang Ki-hoo	Ryann Shannon and Parker Simmons	September 29, 2017	1044-029	0.82
K.O. wishes to train better in order to level up, so he travels with Hero, a warrior looking to finish his quest. While excited at first to be fighting along with Hero's unflinching enthusiasm, K.O. quickly grows tired due to the sheer amount of grinding it takes.: Special Guest: Michael Sinterniklaas as Hero; Note: Crossover between OK K.O.! and Ian's popular webcomic, RPG World.
35	35	"Glory Days"	Sunjae Lee, Byungjae Oh, and Suhong Kim	Ryann Shannon and Parker Simmons	October 13, 2017	1044-035	0.96
For a school report, K.O. listens to his mom Carol tell the story of when she, Mr. Gar (who was known as El-Bow), and a kangaroo-like hero named Rippy Roo joined the superhero team P.O.I.N.T. and took part in their first mission together.
36	36	"Parents' Day"	Sunjae Lee, Byungjae Oh, and Suhong Kim	Stevie Borbolla and Danny Ducker	October 27, 2017	1044-049	0.89
K.O. and Rad follow Enid to her house after her parents are the only ones that didn't show up to Parents' Day at the Bodega. When they get there, they find that her parents are a vampire and a werewolf, and that she is a witch by birth.
37	37	"Let's Have a Stakeout"	Chang-woo Shin	Dave Alegre and Haewon Lee	September 29, 2017	1044-040	0.82
Mr. Gar initiates a stake out to capture the Shadowy Figure who is sneaking around the plaza. K.O. forces himself along much to Mr. Gar's irritation, but ends up discovering something.
38	38	"The Power Is Yours"	Chang-woo Shin	Dave Alegre and Haewon Lee	October 9, 2017	1044-031	1.29
When Lord Boxman and the Eco Villainess Dr. Blight are trashing the Plaza with pollutants, Planeteer Kwame (the only member of the Planeteers who is still active in environmental work) swings in and recruits K.O., Rad, Enid and the quarreling team of Brandon and A Real Magic Skeleton to wield the elemental rings and take back the ecosystem!: Special Guests: LeVar Burton as Kwame and David Coburn as Captain Planet; Notes: The events of the crossover specials take place after the final episode of the series.
39	39	"Rad Likes Robots"	Hwang Ki-hoo	Stevie Borbolla and Danny Ducker	October 6, 2017	1044-044	0.77
After being struck by lightning, Shannon's programming malfunctions, causing her to fall in love with Rad. At the same time, Rad falls for Shannon, much to the dismay of their respective sides in a Romeo and Juliet-style story.
40	40	"KO's Video Channel"	Hwang Ki-hoo	Geneva Hodgson and Mira Ongchua	October 6, 2017	1044-041	0.77
When Rad and Enid discover that K.O. has been posting embarrassing videos of them online, they tell him to delete them. However, the two begin watching his uploads and discover that they are entertaining and heartwarming and attempt to stop him from wiping his channel.
41	41	"Villains' Night Out" (Part 1)	Chang-woo Shin	Dave Alegre and Haewon Lee	November 17, 2017	1044-042	0.87
When Professor Venomous arrives at Boxmore to check on Boxman's "secret project", he reveals that he is headed to a villain party, resulting in Boxman forcing his way in and making a mockery of himself.
42	42	"Villains' Night In" (Part 2)	Hwang Ki-hoo	Geneva Hodgson and Ryann Shannon	November 17, 2017	1044-046	0.87
During the events of "Villains' Night Out", Fink is left in the care of Boxman's robots, Darrell and Shannon, who must restrain her from attacking the Lakewood Plaza heroes as it would mean disobeying Boxman.
43	43	"Back in Red Action"	Hwang Ki-hoo	Mira Ongchua and Parker Simmons	November 3, 2017	1044-043	0.96
Red Action invites Enid to come along with her to the Danger Zone. The day gets crazier with the arrival of Red's former team from the future, the Hue Troop, with whom she has unfinished business.
44	44	"OK Dendy! Let's Be K.O.!"	Chang-woo Shin	Geneva Hodgson and Mira Ongchua	March 5, 2018 (Note: This episode was first released online on February 5, 2018.)	1044-048	0.61
When K.O. remembers that he has to visit his grandmother, Dendy decides to fill in for him in every aspect including battling robots. She quickly comes to realize that in order to "learn [a] life lesson" she needs to "subvert expectations", but even this seems complicated.
45	45	"Let's Take a Moment"	Sunjae Lee, Byungjae Oh, and Suhong Kim	Stevie Borbolla and Danny Ducker	November 10, 2017	1044-039	1.01
An old foe from Mr. Gar and Carols' P.O.I.N.T. past shows up at the Bodega, causing him to have an open flashback of the guilt-inducing "sandwich incident" that caused Carol to hate him.
46	46	"RMS & Brandon's First Episode"	Sunjae Lee, Byungjae Oh, and Seonghyun Cheon	Stevie Borbolla and Danny Ducker	February 26, 2018	1044-047	0.75
When Mad Sam approaches iFrame Outlet to frame his helmet, A Real Magic Skeleton feels he is wasting away and Brandon refuses to take his job seriously. A Real Magic Skeleton decides it is time for him to move on and find another job.
47	47	"Mystery Science Fair 201X"	Chang-woo Shin	Ryann Shannon and Parker Simmons	February 19, 2018	1044-036	0.83
When their teacher, Miss Quantum, hits them with a science fair project, Dendy decides to use K.O. for an experiment to test how he becomes T.K.O. However, as she begins to disregard his warnings, as well as his health and feelings, she suddenly finds herself unable to control K.O.'s savage alter ego.
48	48	"Let's Not Be Skeletons"	Chang-woo Shin	Ryann Shannon and Parker Simmons	March 12, 2018 (Note: This episode was first released online on February 26, 2018.)	1044-045	0.67
The plaza is visited by a huckster named Gil Ferris who sells the heroes "Skeleton Remotes", remote controls that can turn anything and anyone into skeletons. However, when K.O.'s friends get turned into skeletons and Gil begins selling to villains, K.O. steps up to convince everyone the dangers of this new device.
49	49	"Lad & Logic"	Hwang Ki-hoo	Dave Alegre and Haewon Lee	February 26, 2018	1044-038	0.75
After realizing that Mr. Logic is a robot, K.O. learns of his origins as the first of Lord Boxman's robots and how he came to learn about creating for good through Mr. Gar and how he rebelled against his short sighted creator.
50	50	"Action News"	Hwang-ki Hoo	Mira Ongchua and Geneva Hodgson	March 12, 2018	1044-050	0.67
Famed action news reporter of the neutral zone, Dynamite Watkins, reports on the latest happenings around the plaza, but when she tries to report on the evil happenings at Boxmore, her boss, the Big Cheese, insists that she stick to the script.
51	51	"You're in Control"	Seonghyun Cheon, Hwang Ki-hoo, Suhong Kim, Sunjae Lee, and Byungjae Oh	Dave Alegre and Haewon Lee	April 6, 2018	1044-051	0.81
52	52	"You're in Control"	Seonghyun Cheon, Hwang Ki-hoo, Suhong Kim, Sunjae Lee, and Byungjae Oh	Danny Ducker and Stevie Borbolla	April 6, 2018	1044-052	0.81
Dendy tries to help K.O. control T.K.O. much to the anger of his friends and family, however K.O. has to call upon his darker side anyway when Lord Boxman reveals his latest creation, Boxman Jr., who turns out to be a formidable foe for the Lakewood Plaza heroes. K.O. ultimately must reason with T.K.O. who just wants to fight. Meanwhile, Darrell feels unappreciated by Lord Boxman and plots to take revenge on his father by doing the "most evil thing" he can think of. After Boxman Jr. is defeated, Boxman is fired and shot into the sun, thanks to Darrell exposing his scheme to the board.: Note: This episode is the series' second 22-minute special, and as such, it counts as 2 episodes.

=== Season 2 (2018–19) ===
No. overall	No. in season	Title	Animation direction by	Written and storyboarded by	Original release date	Prod. code	U.S viewers (millions)
53	1	"Seasons Change"	Suhong Kim and Byungjae Oh	Stevie Borbolla and Ryann Shannon	May 5, 2018 (Note: This episode was first released online on May 4, 2018.)	1064-056	0.55
After a three-month time skip, Rad and Enid come back as a "Tangerine Man" (from massive sun burning) and a mime (as the result of Enid mistaking her summer class as a ninja class). While the two display their new prowess, K.O. is upset over the changes and the friends' obvious training blunder. They are quickly put to the test when they fight off against Big Bull Demon.
54	2	"Lord Cowboy Darrell"	Hwang-ki Hoo	Mira Ongchua and Geneva Hodgson	May 5, 2018	1064-053	0.53
With Boxmore's stocks rising thanks to Lord Cowboy Darrell, everything appears to be improving. However, Boxman returns from the sun and demands that he get his job back. To give him a dose of his own medicine, Darrell has Boxman partake in a role reversal and attack the plaza, but the Bodega employees decide to give him a pep talk. When confronting Darrell again, Boxman remembers what K.O., Rad, and Enid told him, so he realizes and acknowledges how much more successful his son was, surprising Darrell. Boxman even says how proud he is of Darrell before he leaves Boxmore, devastating his son.
55	3	"Hope This Flies"	Hwang-ki Hoo	Danny Ducker and Parker Simmons	March 19, 2018	1064-055	0.66
K.O. accidentally destroys Rad's van when he was trying to upgrade it to fly. K.O. and Dendy secretly rebuild it, against Rad's wishes to do it himself, and enter a competition against Red Action and her battle tank.
56	4	"The Perfect Meal"	Chang-woo Shin	Dave Alegre and Haewon Lee	March 19, 2018	1064-054	0.66
When K.O. realizes that Carol actually makes the food he eats, he decides to repay her by making her favorite dish; Galaxy Truffle Pasta. K.O. teams up with Beardo and Baby Teeth to hunt for the elusive ingredients.
57	5	"Plaza Film Festival"	Hwang-ki Hoo	Mira Ongchua and Geneva Hodgson	May 5, 2018	1064-057	0.61
K.O., Rad and Enid create a film for the Plaza Film Festival. Darrell, Shannon and Raymond also enter in an effort to win the trophy which is made of plutonium which they want to use to destroy the Plaza. When their film plays, the heroes are shocked to hear so much criticism from the audience causing them to lose their morale.
58	6	"Be a Team"	Chang-woo Shin	Dave Alegre and Haewon Lee	May 5, 2018	1064-058	0.65
After 100 days of sales, K.O., Rad and Enid cannot stand one another. Mr. Gar calls in the experts, Nick Army and Joff the Shaolin Monk, to come in and teach the employees about teamwork and yin and yang. However, the employees' training gets shaky when Nick and Joff also begin to tire of each other's teaching methods.
59	7	"My Fair Carol"	Hwang-ki Hoo	Danny Ducker and Parker Simmons	May 12, 2018	1064-059	0.47
With Mr. Gar and Carol now dating, K.O., Enid and Rad decide to help the latter out on a date to the Danger Zone. Things seem to be going off without a hitch, though the heroes are causing mild discomfort for the two. Soon, they have to stop a sandworm from ruining the date.
60	8	"Point to the Plaza"	Sunjae Lee, Byungjae Oh, and Suhong Kim	Stevie Borbolla and Ryann Shannon	May 19, 2018 (Note: This episode was first released online on May 18, 2018.)	1064-060	0.49
K.O. begins feeding a gloop despite Enid's objection and ends up creating a large gloop monster that takes over the Bodega. The superhero team P.O.I.N.T. arrives and attempts to take care of the situation. K.O. begins to fawn over P.O.I.N.T. hero Chip Damage which angers Enid who does not find him very effective.
61	9	"The So-Bad-ical"	Hwang-ki Hoo	Mira Ongchua and Geneva Hodgson	May 12, 2018	1064-061	0.74
At Lakewood Plaza Elementary, Miss Quantum is replaced with Ernesto who begins enforcing memorization instead of actual learning. K.O. and Dendy realize that they need to get their old teacher back who does not want to return and instead go back to her original passion, being a supervillain named Bad Apple.
62	10	"Let's Watch the Boxmore Show"	Chang-woo Shin	Dave Alegre and Haewon Lee	May 12, 2018	1064-062	0.56
Mr. Gar reveals to the Bodega employees the security system microphone that runs everywhere including Boxmore. K.O., Enid and Rad end up hooked on watching Boxmore's bots getting involved in a reality show-style drama, but when the bots threaten to terrorize the Plaza, the employees begin abusing the microphone.
63	11	"Your World Is an Illusion"	Hwang-ki Hoo	Danny Ducker and Parker Simmons	May 12, 2018	1064-063	0.71
K.O. meets Holo-Jane, a holographic hero, who reveals that K.O.'s entire life is fake. Refusing to believe her, K.O. attempts to go about his day and is horrified to learn that his entire life is just a cartoon. He finds himself on the outskirts of his reality and needing Holo-Jane's help.
64	12	"Red Action to the Future"	Hwang Ki-Hoo	Mira Ongchua and Geneva Hodgson	May 19, 2018	1064-065	0.52
Red Action is called away to the future to take part in an epic battle. When she comes back after months (seconds to K.O. and Enid), Enid begins to feel that her friendship is slipping away due to the distance in time. At K.O.'s suggestion, Enid hops into the future to confront Red Action about her feelings.
65	13	"T.K.O.'s House"	Suhong Kim (Note: Suhong Kim's name is credited twice by mistake.) and Byungjae Oh	Stevie Borbolla and Ryann Shannon	May 19, 2018	1064-064	0.43
When T.K.O. begins causing a ruckus in his subconscious after having visions of Shadowy Figure, K.O. visits him and decides to help go look for Shadowy Figure in an attempt to get answers. However, T.K.O. wants freedom so the two are forced to share their body at the same time, which is easier said then done.
66	14	"Special Delivery"	Hwang Ki-hoo	Iggy Craig and Danny Ducker	July 2, 2018 (Note: This episode was first released online on June 29, 2018.)	1064-067	0.46
Mr. Gar sets Rad and Enid up to go deliver a package to Neo-Riot City. The two drive there, via Rad's van, and after an awkward start, the two quickly share a bond over their love of cheesy rock music. However, Rad begins to feel bad when Enid begins ragging on him for his tastes and begins to question his friendship with her.
67	15	"Dendy's Power"	Chang-woo Shin	Dave Alegre and Haewon Lee	May 19, 2018	1064-066	0.61
Dendy finds out that K.O.'s Pow Card has a glitch and tries to fix it. Instead they discover an exploit to personalize its appearance and it becomes popular among the Plaza. Shannon grows jealous and uses her powers to take control of all the Pow Cards, and K.O. and Dendy spring into action to stop her.
68	16	"Wisdom, Strength and Charisma"	Sunjae Lee, Byungjae Oh, and Suhong Kim	Stevie Borbolla and Ryann Shannon	July 2, 2018	1064-068	0.47
Enid sets off to start her first day at P.O.I.N.T. Prep Academy along with sophomore Sparko. With Enid nervous, K.O. tags along to help encourage her, but she kicks him off the bus, nevertheless he leaves a memento to help her. When she gets there, she must take an exam or else be kicked out of her new school.
69	17	"Bittersweet Rivals"	Hwang Ki-hoo	Mira Ongchua and Geneva Hodgson	July 2, 2018	1064-069	0.56
Following from the previous episode, Enid learns that her new bunk mate is ex-friend Elodie who still shows an antagonistic side from last time they met. Elodie attempts to show up Enid throughout the school day, but she perseveres (even besting Elodie) until her animosity boils to the top.
70	18	"Are You Ready for Some Megafootball?"	Chang-woo Shin	Dave Alegre and Haewon Lee	July 2, 2018	1064-070	0.55
Enid ends up joining P.O.I.N.T. Prep's Megafootball team after their star player is injured. Their rivals end up being the Lakewood Plaza Team with Rad as one of its players. While Enid and Rad attempt to have fun, Foxtail insists that Enid's team win or else she is expelled.
71	19	"Mystery Sleepover"	Hwang Ki-hoo	Iggy Craig and Danny Ducker	July 2, 2018	1064-071	0.60
Enid is concerned about the previous days at P.O.I.N.T. Prep so she and Elodie have a sleepover and invite K.O. and Rad. However, when Elodie begins to act mysteriously, the trio go to investigate the school and discover a shocking secret that convinces K.O. and Rad to stay so as to look out for Enid.
72	20	"Final Exams"	Sunjae Lee, Byungjae Oh, and Suhong Kim	Stevie Borbolla and Ryann Shannon	May 12, 2019 (Note: This episode was first released online on September 21, 2018.)	1064-072	0.36
Following the events of "Mystery Sleepover" when they learned of a secret society within P.O.I.N.T. Prep, K.O. and Rad are apprehended with Enid enlisting Elodie's help. But the group discover that Chip is actually an android created by Dr. Greyman and he is malfunctioning.
73	21	"Soda Genie"	Hwang Ki-hoo	Mira Ongchua and Geneva Hodgson	May 19, 2019	1064-073	0.32
K.O. finds a bottle of Citrus Twist in the back and summons a sinister genie named Twisty. When she literally answers K.O.'s wish to "make Rad a burger", Enid and K.O. take Twisty to court where they present a series of stories Rashomon style.
74	22	"CarolQuest"	Hwang Ki-hoo	Mira Ongchua and Geneva Hodgson	May 12, 2019	1064-077	0.33
Carol is called away by Foxtail to protect the glorb tree. Not wanting to leave him with Mr. Gar, K.O. is brought along under the belief that Carol is taking him on a scavenger hunt. It soon becomes apparent that K.O. knows more about Carol's mission than she thought.
75	23	"Boxman Crashes"	Hwang Ki-hoo	Iggy Craig and Danny Ducker	May 26, 2019	1064-079	0.25
An extremely bored Professor Venomous finds Lord Boxman living in his trash can and takes pity on him by letting him stay, but quickly comes to regret it as Boxman keeps making messes. However, Boxman's latest scheme to get back at the Bodega quickly intrigues Venomous and Fink. In the end, Venomous decides to acquire Boxmore so Boxman can be CEO again.
76	24	"Crossover Nexus"	Sunjae Lee, Byungjae Oh, and Suhong Kim	Dave Alegre, Iggy Craig, Danny Ducker, Haewon Lee, and Parker Simmons	October 8, 2018	1064-074	0.76
In the Cartoon Network City, K.O. is summoned by the villain Strike who plans on eradicating all the heroes from the Cartoon Network Universe. Now K.O. must team up with Garnet from Steven Universe, Ben Tennyson from Ben 10 and Raven from Teen Titans Go! to stop him.: Special Guests: Estelle as Garnet, Tara Strong as Ben Tennyson, Raven and Ilana, MacinTalk Junior as Robot Jones, Pete Browngardt as Festro and Uncle Grandpa, Michael Dorn as Strike and I.M. Weasel and John DiMaggio as Four Arms, Jake the Dog and Shnitzel; Notes: The events of the crossover specials take place during the fifth and final season of Steven Universe, during the second season of Ben 10, and during the fifth season of Teen Titans GO!.
77	25	"Plaza Alone"	Sunjae Lee, Byungjae Oh, and Suhong Kim	Dave Alegre and Haewon Lee	May 19, 2019 (Note: This episode was first released online on December 13, 2018.)	1064-078	0.31
It is K.O.'s 6-11th birthday and he makes his birthday wish to spend a whole day with Rad and Enid. The trio head out to the Plaza only to find that it is deserted. They decide to take advantage of the situation, but they suddenly begin losing their grip on reality when they think that someone is watching them.
78	26	"All in the Villainy"	Hwang Ki-hoo	Stevie Borbolla and Ryann Shannon	May 26, 2019 (Note: This episode was first released online on May 10, 2019.)	1064-080	0.27
K.O., Rad and Enid stop a fight with Boxmore prematurely after realizing that Darrell and Fink cannot stop fighting each other. Boxman and Venomous decide to have the two share a room to work out their differences. However, this turns out to be even more disastrous as they continue to fight over petty things.
79	27	"Monster Party"	Suhong Kim and Byungjae Oh	Stevie Borbolla and Ryann Shannon	October 21, 2018 (Note: This episode was first released online on October 1, 2018.)	1064-076	0.45
In this crazy Halloween episode, K.O. visits Enid just in time to see her childhood friends from Ghoul School arrive for a visit. The gang is excited to have their "witch" back, but Enid is afraid of telling them about her status as a ninja despite K.O. reminding her that she "already had this arc".: Special Guests: Russi Taylor as Phantasma, Pat Musick as Elsa Frankenteen, Susan Blu as Sibella, Natalie Palamides as Winnie and Kristen Li as Tanis
80	28	"GarQuest"	Chang-woo Shin	Iggy Craig and Danny Ducker	June 16, 2019	1064-083	0.32
K.O. is hanging out with Mr. Gar when he is called away on a secret mission. K.O. manages to finagle his way into going with him, during which Mr. Gar reveals why he left P.O.I.N.T. what he did afterwards and how he came to protect the plaza tree and earn secret missions from the President of the Universe.
81	29	"Super Black Friday"	Chang-woo Shin	Geneva Hodgson and Mira Ongchua	December 16, 2018 (Note: This episode was first released online on November 21, 2018.)	1064-081	0.38
It's Super Black Friday on Shucksgiving Day and K.O., Rad and Enid are forced to work at the Bodega. After realizing that they can just leave, they encounter a long line around the Plaza and try to get everyone to go home. However, Principal Claus arrives to tell them why Super Black Friday is an important "tradition" to everyone.
82	30	"Whacky Jaxxyz"	Hwang Ki-hoo	Dave Alegre and Haewon Lee	June 2, 2019	1064-082	0.25
K.O. learns about Whacky Jaxxyz from his classmate Nanini and takes up the sport, leaving Pow Cards behind. They are beckoned by a transfer student named Johnny to join the Whacky Jaxxyz tournament, but realize that the game is a life or death situation when the creator traps them in the Shad'o Realm.
83	31	"Sidekick Scouts"	Hwang Ki-hoo	Stevie Borbolla and Ryann Shannon	June 2, 2019	1064-084	0.24
Feeling let down by Chip Damage, K.O. decides that he wants to join the Sidekick Scouts, but is considered too experienced for it. He gets the attention of an Astro Boy-esque sidekick named Combo Breaker who decides to be his sidekick. However, Combo turns out to be incredibly obnoxious to the more mature K.O.
84	32	"Project Ray Way"	Sunjae Lee, Byungjae Oh, and Suhong Kim	Geneva Hodgson and Mira Ongchua	June 9, 2019	1064-085	0.32
Raymond starts his own fashion line that annoys Rad and Drupe. The two decide to start their own called Strawbaby Couture to great success until Raymond begins making rip-off products. Angered, they challenge him to a fashion battle with K.O. and Enid in tow. However, Raymond once again stoops to low tactics.
85	33	"I Am Jethro"	Hwang Ki-hoo	Dave Alegre and Haewon Lee	June 9, 2019	1064-086	0.29
A Jethro ends up getting overstuffed with glorbs, causing it to be able to speak full sentences and gain arms and legs. During a fight, he ends up befriending K.O. and learns that he can do more than just "move forward". His outing convinces him to lead the other Jethros in an attempt to overthrow Boxmore.
86	34	"Beach Episode"	Chang-woo Shin	Iggy Craig and Danny Ducker	June 23, 2019 (Note: This episode was first released online on June 7, 2019.)	1064-087	0.32
The gang hang out at Gar's Cabana at the beach when they decide to have fun in the waves. However, Boxmore's bots arrive and start causing trouble. To settle the dispute, they challenge each other to a series of challenges, but soon it gets interrupted by King Wavezilla who begins flooding the beach.
87	35	"Rad's Alien Sickness"	Sunjae Lee, Byungjae Oh, and Suhong Kim	Geneva Hodgson and Mira Ongchua	June 30, 2019	1064-089	0.32
Professor Venomous and Fink surprise the Lakewood Plaza Heroes with a special virus that they concocted that gets them sick. While K.O. and Enid recover quickly, Rad refuses to get rest so that he can lift his one millionth box. This is made more difficult with the arrival of an updated Ernesto.
88	36	"K.O.'s Health Week"	Hwang Ki-hoo	Stevie Borbolla and Ryann Shannon	June 30, 2019	1064-088	0.34
In this educational episode, K.O. spends the week covering topics involving hygiene, self-esteem, nutrition, mental health and exercise. Even Boxmore's bots get in on the action when they realize that K.O. has not been getting his sleep due to him looking up all the topics covered in the episode.
89	37	"Gar Trains Punching Judy"	Hwang Ki-hoo	Dave Alegre and Haewon Lee	June 16, 2019	1064-090	0.28
Punching Judy wants to join the upcoming fighting tournament, but is embarrassed about losing to her older sister Punching Trudy who wins every year. K.O. takes her to see Mr. Gar so that he can train her. While he is successful at training her physically, he has trouble training her emotionally, so K.O. offers him some help.
90	38	"OK A.U.! Alternate Universe"	Chang-woo Shin	Iggy Craig and Danny Ducker	June 23, 2019	1064-091	0.32
When K.O., Enid and Rad argue with Darrell, Shannon and Raymond over who has it worse, an alternate reality warlock decides to put them in an alternate reality where the heroes are robots and the robots are heroes, leading to a series of comical situations.
91	39	"Dark Plaza"	Min Gyeong-Seok, Sunjae Lee, Byungjae Oh, and Suhong Kim	Stevie Borbolla and Ryann Shannon	June 30, 2019	1064-092HH	0.29
92	40	"Dark Plaza"	Min Gyeong-Seok, Sunjae Lee, Byungjae Oh, and Suhong Kim	Geneva Hodgson and Mira Ongchua	June 30, 2019	1064-075R	0.29
P.O.I.N.T. arrives and takes over the plaza so that they can collect the glorbs that manifest underground, resulting in Carol having to admit her connection to them to a defeated Mr. Gar. Two months later, K.O. and his friends have started a resistance movement to take back the plaza. They learn that the plaza's origin as a giant robot named Plazamo are true and use it to take down Foxtail and Elodie who have used a dangerous power removing ray to fight the heroes.: Note: This episode is the series' third 22-minute special, and as such, it counts as 2 episodes.

=== Season 3 (2019) ===
No. overall	No. in season	Title	Animation direction by	Written and storyboarded by	Original release date	Prod. code	U.S viewers (millions)
93	1	"We Are Heroes"	Seo Jeongseok	Dave Alegre and Haewon Lee	July 7, 2019 (Note: This episode was first released online on July 5, 2019.)	1072-093	0.29
K.O., Rad and Enid are now full time heroes at the Bodega, with new hires replacing their old positions. Mr. Gar and Carol send the trio out while Dendy acts as their off sight support. While everyone is happy with the new set up, K.O. feels that he is not contributing much and is concerned when a dragon begins attacking Ted Viking and Foxy's house.
94	2	"K.O., Rad, and Enid!"	Chang-woo Shin	Iggy Craig and Danny Ducker	July 7, 2019	1072-094	0.27
When Dynamite Watkins confronts K.O., Rad and Enid on their team name, they realize that they do not have one. They decide to come up with some sort of gimmick, with Drupe's help, so that they can think of a cool name. However they cannot decide on their costumes which is made more infuriating when Raymond arrives to once again mock them.
95	3	"Let's Meet Sonic"	Seo Jeongseok	Stevie Borbolla and Ryann Shannon	August 4, 2019	1072-095	0.36
The Bodega is unexpectedly visited by Sonic the Hedgehog and Miles "Tails" Prower, who aid K.O. in rescuing his friends from Lord Boxman. As Sonic tries to help K.O. with new techniques, Tails feels left out especially when Sonic starts calling him his "little buddy". When K.O. gets roboticized, Sonic must return him to normal.: Special Guests: Roger Craig Smith as Sonic, Colleen O'Shaughnessey as Tails; Sonic Sez segment: Not to sleep through life
96	4	"T.K.O. Rules!"	Sunjae Lee and Byungjae Oh	Geneva Hodgson and Mira Ongchua	July 14, 2019	1072-096	0.33
Carol decides to let K.O. take care of himself for the day while she is out. As a friendly gesture, K.O. visits T.K.O. inside his brain and they decide to switch places for fun. However, T.K.O. ends up being rowdy and breaking all the rules that Carol has set up. As K.O. realizes the error he has made, he is forced to make a harsh decision against T.K.O.
97	5	"K.O. vs. Fink"	Seo Jeongseok	Dave Alegre and Haewon Lee	July 21, 2019	1072-097	0.32
K.O. loves his mom Carol, but Fink arrives to turn that all around by making fun of him and calling him a "mama's boy". Feeling miserable, K.O. gets help from his "inner monologue," which is actually Shadowy Figure, to get even with Fink by getting angry. K.O. channels his anger to battle her, but it only seems to make her even more malicious.
98	6	"Chip's Damage"	Chang-woo Shin	Iggy Craig and Danny Ducker	July 14, 2019	1072-098	0.33
As the public wonders what has become of Chip Damage, Elodie recruits K.O. in reactivating the Chip Damage robot in an attempt to improve on him and bring hope back to everyone. In their haste, they end up damaging Chip Damage's image and it takes an intervention from retired hero, Dr. Greyman, to remind them what makes an actual hero.
99	7	"The K.O. Trap"	Seo Jeongseok	Stevie Borbolla and Ryann Shannon	July 21, 2019	1072-099	0.30
K.O., Rad, and Enid break into Boxmore to get back their doors when they find themselves in a box shaped room that does not have any doors or windows. As they wait it out, they begin to realize that something is not right. Rad and Enid are, in fact, replaced with goo clones and K.O. must now get to the bottom of this mysterious situation.
100	8	"Whatever Happened to... Rippy Roo?"	Suhong Kim, Sunjae Lee, and Byungjae Oh	Iggy Craig, Danny Ducker, and Mira Ongchua	July 28, 2019 (Note: This episode was first released online on July 26, 2019.)	1072-100	0.37
Rippy Roo makes a sudden appearance at the plaza and immediately begins catching up with Carol by revealing what she had been doing all these years after leaving P.O.I.N.T. Meanwhile, K.O. ventures into Rippy Roo's pouch after a creature called a Mecha Maw steals his prized binder of very rare Pow Cards.: This is the 100th episode of the series overall.
101	9	"Planet X"	Seo Jeongseok	Dave Alegre and Haewon Lee	July 28, 2019	1072-101	0.38
Rad goes to Planet X to join his family reunion. Upon arriving he is shocked to discover that the majority of his family are nerds. He later learns that his grandfather, Coach, is a jock and that X-ians have been split into nerds and jocks after humans visited the planet years ago and shared many of their existing culture with them.
102	10	"Deep Space Vacation"	Chang-woo Shin	Iggy Craig and Danny Ducker	August 4, 2019	1072-102	0.34
Noticing that K.O. and Enid are sad that Rad is still on Planet X, Mr. Gar gives them his old space bike and tells them to take a vacation. The two arrive only to learn that the shape shifting Cosma has devoured the planet whole. As K.O. and Enid desperately attempt to rescue the planet from being digested, Rad and his family do not seem to care.
103	11	"Big Reveal"	Seo Jeongseok	Stevie Borbolla and Ryann Shannon	August 11, 2019	1072-103	0.40
Carol casually reveals to K.O. that Laserblast is his father. He is excited at the prospect that he has "hero blood" in him and takes on another mission from Mr. Gar to confront Lord Boxman and Professor Venomous. However, Venomous reveals that he was Laserblast and is K.O.'s father. Soon, a distraught Carol arrives to learn the origin of his villainous transformation.
104	12	"Radical Rescue"	Suhong Kim, Sunjae Lee, and Byungjae Oh	Mira Ongchua and Kat Ruzics	August 11, 2019	1072-104	0.35
Rad starts feeling uncomfortable when K.O. begins exhibiting negative behavior that he picked up from him, Mega Football Baby and Bellbeefer. He tries to hide his love for kittens as well as him volunteering at the local animal shelter. When Mikayla infiltrates the shelter and begins attacking everyone, Rad has to convince K.O. to drop the macho thing.
105	13	"You're a Good Friend, K.O."	Seo Jeongseok	Dave Alegre and Haewon Lee	August 18, 2019 (Note: This episode was first released online on August 16, 2019.)	1072-105	0.29
When the power goes out at school, K.O. and Dendy go out and investigate. K.O. feels bad for Dendy because the other students continuously praise him, but look down on her. They discover that Small Calf Demon is behind the power outage, but when K.O. gets kidnapped by him, Dendy must step into action and use her techno abilities to defeat the villain.
106	14	"Let's Get Shadowy"	Chang-woo Shin	Iggy Craig and Danny Ducker	August 18, 2019	1072-106	0.31
Carol drops K.O. off at Boxmore for the weekend so that he can spend time with Professor Venomous. K.O. is disappointed to learn that Venomous is nothing at all like him, so he suggests that they look for Shadowy Figure so that they can "destroy" him. As they look for clues on where he might be, Fink is holding a secret back about her villainous boss.
107	15	"Red Action 3: Grudgement Day"	Seo Jeongseok	Eleisiya Arocha, Stevie Borbolla, and Ryann Shannon	August 25, 2019	1072-107	0.27
Rad and Red Action once again get caught in a feud. Getting annoyed at how far their bickering has gotten, K.O. and Enid use Red Action's time travel belt to travel to the past to make sure that the two do not bicker with one another. When they cannot find the problem, Rad finally reveals that it involved the events of "You're Everybody's Sidekick".
108	16	"Carl"	Sunjae Lee and Byungjae Oh	Mira Ongchua and Kat Ruzics	August 25, 2019	1072-108	0.30
K.O. once again is spending time with Professor Venomous in an attempt to bond with him. He creates Carl, a gelatinous blob-like creature, but it ends up getting loose, forcing the two to chase it down. As Venomous starts to become distant from the whole ordeal, K.O. begins to suspect that something is up, resulting in T.K.O. taking charge.
109	17	"Dendy's Video Channel"	Seo Jeongseok	Dave Alegre and Haewon Lee	September 6, 2019	1072-109	0.49
Sometime after the previous episode, T.K.O. and Shadowy Venomous have become a terrifying duo laying waste to everything. Dendy attempts to cheer everyone up to no avail. When Lord Boxman is kicked out of Boxmore, he abandons his bots as he feels that he can no longer provide for them, resulting in Dendy recruiting them as the Plaza's new saviors.: This is the first part of the four-part finale.
110	18	"Let's Fight to the End"	Seo Jeongseok and Chang-woo Shin	Iggy Craig and Danny Ducker	September 6, 2019	1072-110	0.48
111	19	"Let's Fight to the End"	Seo Jeongseok and Chang-woo Shin	Stevie Borbolla and Ryann Shannon	September 6, 2019	1072-111	0.48
The Pow Card company decides to hold a tournament with T.K.O. joining for his and Shadowy Venomous' own nefarious scheme. Rad and Enid join in to rescue their friend and stop the villains once and for all. Shadowy Venomous manages to secure the glorb tree for himself and plans to drain the powers of all the heroes in the world. K.O. fights his way out of T.K.O.'s mind and discovers a hidden memory that could very well save his and everyone else's lives.: This is the second and third parts of the four-part finale and the series' fourth and final 22-minute special, and as such, it counts as 2 episodes.
112	20	"Thank You for Watching the Show"	Byungjae Oh	Mira Ongchua and Kat Ruzics (Note: Additional storyboards by Dave Alegre, Stevie Borbolla, Iggy Craig, Danny Ducker, Geneva Hodgson, Toby Jones, Ian Jones-Quartey, Haewon Lee, and Ryann Shannon)	September 6, 2019	1072-112	0.45
In this epilogue, K.O. finds his life moving unexpectedly fast, as he begins missing moments in his life. As many of his friends and family grow up and move on, he begins to suspect that a villain is behind this odd conundrum. However, no matter how many villains he faces, he cannot keep things from changing. He learns to accept that he needs to grow up and move on in life. A final montage plays depicting what became of everyone, ending with K.O. becoming the new owner of the Bodega and signing off with "Thank you for watching the show!": This is the fourth and final part of the four-part finale and the series' final episode.
