= Wake Up, Carlo! =

- Acorda, Carlo!
- Genre: Animated series Comedy
- Created by: Juliano Enrico
- Directed by: Juliano Enrico
- Voices of: Gustavo Pereira Andrei Duarte Julia Cartier Bresson Melissa Garcia Evelyn Castro Alexandre Moreno
- Country of origin: Brazil
- Original language: Portuguese
- No. of seasons: 1
- No. of episodes: 13

Production
- Executive producer: Vivian Amadio
- Producer: Zé Brandão
- Running time: 22 minutes
- Production companies: TV Quase; Copa Studio; Netflix

Original release
- Network: Netflix
- Release: July 6, 2023

Wake Up, Carlo! (Portuguese: Acorda, Carlo!) is a 2023 Brazilian animation created and directed by Juliano Enrico (also creator of Jorel's Brother) and produced by Copa Studio. It is the first Brazilian original Netflix animated series. With 13 episodes, it was made available for streaming on July 6, 2023, in 79 countries, including Brazil.

== Summary ==
The series tells the story of Carlo, a lively, playful 7-year-old boy who loves guava cookies. However, after falling under a spell, he falls into a deep sleep for 22 years. Upon waking, he realizes that the world around him has changed radically. When he reunites with his friends, who have become busy adults, Carlo begins to influence them with his childlike and playful spirit, embarking on adventures alongside Alberto, a monster who doesn't want to scare anyone, and Tatiana, a grumpy dove who can't fly.

== Reception ==
On the website Rotten Tomatoes, the first season of Wake Up, Carlo! got a 93% approval rate. On IMDb, its average rating is 8.1/10.

In an article published on the website of the Espírito Santo newspaper A Gazeta, critic Rafael Braz describes the animation as a "grand adventure, somewhat psychedelic, with lots of humor and great characters.". Journalist André Carlos Zorzi, writing for O Estado de S. Paulo, endorsed the cartoon as "a suggestion that fans of Jorel's Brother have every reason to check out.

In a review published on the Conectando Net, website, journalist Gambit Cavalcante highlights the references that Wake Up, Carlo! brings about Brazilian culture:

We travel through many accents from different regions of the country; we encounter our cuisine, mainly referenced in the protagonist's love for a biscuit called "Goiabitos"; we find the musicality of funk; the famous Brazilian "jeitinho" of trying to solve problems through camaraderie; and even our resourcefulness in circumventing the censorship of an authoritarian government that insists on erasing our memories and, with them, our history.

For The Review Geek, critic Sarah Almeida described the animation as "light-hearted and enjoyable with a touch of satire"

In September 2024, Wake Up, Carlo! was nominated for an International Emmy Award in the Best Children's Animation category.
