= Trunk Train =

Brazilian children's animated television show

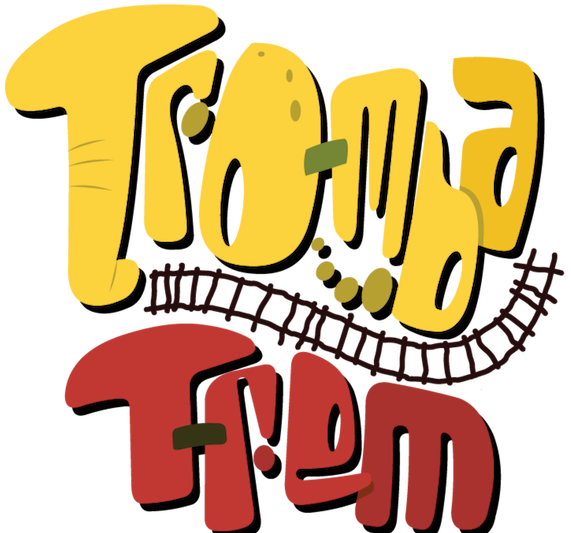
- The Trunk Train logo
- Created by: Zé Brandão
- Written by: Zé Brandão; Suzanne Lang
- Directed by: Zé Brandão
- Country of origin: Brazil
- Original language: Portuguese
- No. of seasons: 3
- No. of episodes: 52

Production
- Running time: 10 minutes
- Production company: Copa Studio

Original release
- Network: TV Cultura; TV Brasil; Cartoon Network
- Release: April 7, 2011 – January 7, 2017

Trunk Train (Portuguese: Tromba Trem) is a Brazilian animated television series created by Zé Brandão and produced by Copa Studio. It was originally released in 2010 as a series of animated short films for the showcase AnimaTV conducted by two public broadcasting channels, TV Cultura and TV Brasil.

== Synopsis ==
Gajah, an elephant from India who lost his memory after an accident, ends up in the Brazilian savanna, where he meets Duda, a vegetarian anteater who becomes his friend and a colony of termites, whose queen believes she is from another planet. Together, they travel on a steam train through South America behind a mysterious airship, which the Termite Queen believes is the "mothership" that will take her colony back to her home world. In each episode, they meet a new place as well as new characters.

== Characters ==
=== Main characters ===
- Gajah: A yellow elephant with memory problems who is on a journey to return to his country of origin. He got lost after falling from the sky (possibly from the airship) and crashing in the middle of the Brazilian savanna, where he forms an alliance with the termite colony and befriends Duda. His main function on the journey is to supply the train with water, since he is the only one who can carry water through his trunk. He always wears a turban that appears to float above his head.
- Duda: An enthusiastic and bespectacled red vegetarian anteater who is Gajah's best friend. She is cheerful and somewhat "childish" for her age, as she always speaks in a hyperactive matter. Sometimes, she loses control of her insectivorous cravings and even loses her vegetarian appetite, but she always returns to normal. Duda often likes to meditate and play the banjo during her spare time.
- The Termite Queen: The bossy and authoritarian ruler of the termite colony, as well as the owner of the train. She is always giving orders and annoying others, especially to Gajah. However, grumpy she may be, she truly cares about her people (sometimes showing some gratitude towards others) and is determined to find a way to get the colony back to their supposed home planet.
- The Captain: A loyal termite in command, he is the one in charge of the army as well as the safety of the train and the pilots. He often proves to be as arrogant as the Queen, but always obeys her orders. He wears an eye patch and a captain's hat that appears to float above his head, like Gajah's turban.
- Junior: A young, yet very intelligent termite who is the Queen's son. Unlike the rest of the colony, he shows the most knowledge and tends to be well-aware of the earth's natural phenomena as well as the flora and fauna of the continent. He wears a pair of glasses similar to Duda's (but smaller), with a brace headgear around his mouth and a topknot in the style of a nerd.
- Master Vulture: A wise purple vulture who serves as a sort of "spirit guide" by giving Gajah and Duda advices, despite lacking any manners. He usually speaks with a hillbilly accent.

=== Secondary characters ===
- The Ant Queen: The ruler of the red ants and rival of the Termite Queen.
- Formikan: The leader of the ant army and the Captain's biggest rival.
- Bela: The daughter of the Ant Queen, and the only ant who has a good relationship with Junior.
- Flea: Junior's pet aphid.
- Cousin Minha: A snobbish cousin of the Queen.
- Roberto III: A termite king who was swallowed by a cane toad and discovered by the Termite Queen, whom she is deeply in love with.
- Joana Kara: A ladybug reporter for a magazine company.
- Lumens Ewald: A firefly who is Joana Kara's co-worker.
- Mr. Dragonfly: A dragonfly who is the local mail carrier for the insects and the termite colony.
- Zoudina: An owl who is Master Vulture's love interest, but it is not known if they are actually in a relationship.
- Fabio: An anteater in love with Duda and in turn, Duda's love interest.
- Hector Boa-Pinta: A slightly cocky otter who greatly enjoys theater. He is the main actor of the soap opera "Rédeas da Paixão" ("Reins of Passion") and is the idol of Duda and the Termite Queen.

=== Minor characters ===
- Sir Beagle - A naturalistic beagle heavily inspired by Charles Darwin.
- Jacarina: A dancing alligator that lives near the Amazon River.
- Guerra Tamarin - A lion tamarin who owns an arts institute, and the first to give notoriety to Gajah's so-called "artistic talent".
- Taturana - A lonomia presenter of the sensationalist "Taturana Show", who, together with her team, tries to make the Termite Queen and Junior fight to have relevant content.
- Scarab Master - A scarab leader of insects that populated the "desert" region of the train.
- The Cub Scots - A quartet of Cub Scouts composed of Max, Will, Rafa and Dani, who briefly become the responsibility of Gajah and Duda when the train accidentally runs over their boss.
- Chief Wolfie – The leader of the wolf pack. He is accidentally run over by the train while teaching the wolves to notice an approaching train on the tracks. He also appears exclusively in the same episode as the wolves.
- The Bat Family - Composed of Lady Draculala, Lord Van Piro, Vlad, Uncle Zéfiro and the youngest son Ed, who Duda must take care of in one episode.
- Rudenee - An illusionist capuchin monkey who speaks with a Bahian accent and challenges Gajah to escape the Chinese Box of Terror after the elephant mocks his technique.
- Manuel - An orca with a European Portuguese accent who briefly helps Gajah return to India, until he changes his mind.

== Broadcast ==
The series debuted on both TV Cultura and TV Brasil on 7 April 2011, later airing in syndicated reruns on Cartoon Network in Brazil and on Tooncast in Latin America the next year on 7 April 2012.

Starting with the second season, the show permanently aired on both Cartoon Network and Tooncast with new episodes debuting on the channels respectively. The show ran until 7 January 2017 with a total of three seasons and 52 episodes.

It is internationally distributed by Cake Entertainment, under the title "Trunk Train".

== Film adaptation ==
A film adaptation of the same name was released in Brazil on 7 September 2022, directed by Zé Brandão and screenplay by Debora Guimarães and Pedro Vieira. It was produced by Copa Studio, and distributed by Manequim Filmes in Brazil.

Gajah is elevated from anonymity to celebrity status overnight, and ends up moving away from his old traveling companions on the train. His fame only lasts for a short time, as he becomes the main suspect in a series of mysterious kidnappings. To unravel this mystery, he will have to count on the help of his old friends.
