= D.P.A. Mini =

- Genre: Mystery; Educational
- Created by: Flávia Lins e Silva
- Based on: Detetives do Prédio Azul by Flávia Lins e Silva
- Written by: Pedro Vieira
- Directed by: Felipe Tavares; André Perlingeiro (episodes 1–2, 11); Renato Faccini (episodes 3–26)
- Voices of: Luciana Ramanzini; Driana Ribeiro; Nina Carvalho; Nany Assis; Letícia Celini; Fernando Mendonça
- Music by: Filipe Trielli; Daniel Galli
- Country of origin: Brazil
- Original language: Portuguese
- No. of seasons: 1
- No. of episodes: 26

Production
- Executive producer: Vivian Amadio
- Producer: André Barroso (line)
- Running time: 4 minutes
- Production company: Copa Studio

Original release
- Network: Globoplay
- Release: December 2, 2023 – present

D.P.A. Mini is a Brazilian animated television series created by Flávia Lins e Silva and is a chibi animation version of the original live-action series Detetives do Prédio Azul. It is produced by Copa Studio for the children's channel Gloobinho through the Globoplay streaming service, it premiered on the platform on December 2, 2023, and on pay TV on December 4 of the same year with the showing of 2 episodes per day.

== Plot ==
The series features child investigators Max, Flor and Zeca, accompanied by witches Berenice and Brisa, who play, wear their capes and investigate the mysteries of the Blue Building in every episode.

== Cast ==
- Nina Carvalho as Flor, she is the detective in the red cape.
- Driana Ribeiro as Max, he is the detective in the yellow cape.
- Luciana Ramanzini as Zeca, he is the detective in the green cape.
- Nany Assis as Berenice, the young witch.
- Letícia Celini as Brisa, is Berenice's sister.
- Fernando Mendonça as Prédio Azul (or Blue Building), he speaks in any things.

== Episodes ==
No.	Brazilian Portuguese title	Original release date	Gloobinho air date
1	"O Aniversário da Brisa"	December 2, 2023	December 4, 2023
Brisa's birthday is here! But Brisa doesn't like any gifts. After giving a clue as to what she wants, the detectives begin an investigation to find the perfect gift!
2	"Pegadas Misteriosas"	December 2, 2023	December 4, 2023
Berenice has disappeared, and all that’s left are mysterious footprints... Could they trace the path to where she is? Brisa joins the detectives to investigate!
3	"O Varal"	December 2, 2023	December 5, 2023
When the detectives go to put on their detective capes, they realize they are missing! What now? Berenice and Brisa help the detectives in this investigation, while Zeca keeps a secret.
4	"Rabiscos No Prédio"	December 2, 2023	December 5, 2023
The detectives go to the building's courtyard and realize that it is all scribbled on! The trio discovers that the chalks have come to life and are scribbling everywhere! What could have happened?
5	"Sorvete"	December 2, 2023	December 6, 2023
On a very hot day, the detectives decide to have some ice cream, but it is all frozen. They investigate what they can do to melt the ice faster.
6	"Dragão Sem Asas"	December 2, 2023	December 6, 2023
Max's dragon doll's wings are missing! How will the doll continue to be a dragon without its wings? The detectives put on their capes and start a new investigation!
7	"Amigos Imaginários"	December 2, 2023	December 7, 2023
Zeca is very excited preparing a party in the courtyard. When his friend arrives, Max and Flor are surprised: there is no one there. They investigate who this mysterious friend is.
8	"Passarinho"	December 2, 2023	December 7, 2023
Detectives find a small bird alone in its nest and set out on an investigation to find the whereabouts of its mother.
9	"Monstro do Armário"	December 2, 2023	December 7, 2023
When Brisa looks for a blanket for Berenice in the closet, she discovers that there is a mysterious monster inside it! Who is it? All they can see are two giant eyes!
10	"Arco-íris"	December 2, 2023	December 8, 2023
The detectives look up, see a beautiful rainbow crossing the sky and it suddenly disappears. They investigate what to do to bring it back.
11	"Mapa do Tesouro"	December 2, 2023	December 8, 2023
In a pirate game, Flor buries her bracelet in the sandbox, but archaeologist Brisa finds it first. The pirate detectives try to recover their treasure.
12	"Mistério do Dente"	December 2, 2023	December 11, 2023
Zeca's baby tooth fell out and he doesn't know where it went. Zeca needs it so the Tooth Fairy can appear at night. The detectives put on their capes to solve this mystery.
13	"Cadê o Prédio?"	December 2, 2023	December 12, 2023
The detectives are playing basketball when the basket and the courtyard suddenly disappear. They discover that the Building is becoming invisible and decide to investigate the phenomenon.
14	"Cadê as Amoras"	December 2, 2023	December 12, 2023
The detectives are having a picnic in the garden when suddenly the blackberries on the cake disappear. They put on their capes and investigate who took the berries.
15	"Tá Frio, Tá Calor"	December 2, 2023	December 13, 2023
The detectives are playing and suddenly everything gets freezing. When they put on their coats, they die of heat. They discover that the Blue Building has a fever.
16	"Ovo Misterioso"	December 2, 2023	December 13, 2023
Flor finds a small egg in the garden, but it is alone and starting to crack. The detectives set out on an investigation to find its family before it is too late.
17	"Dia do Prédio Azul"	December 2, 2023	December 14, 2023
The detectives are playing around when the Blue Building asks if there is anything special about today. Not knowing how to answer, the trio calls Brisa and Berenice to try to find out.
18	"Festa das Bruxas"	December 2, 2023	December 14, 2023
Berê and Brisa are throwing a witches' party, but the detectives can't get in without invitations. They don't know where the invitations the witches sent in the mail went.
19	"Arqueólogos do Prédio Azul"	December 2, 2023	December 15, 2023
After breaking a vase while playing ball, the detectives find a valuable antique. They explore the building to see if there are other valuable things hidden and buried there.
20	"Uma Flor para Flor"	December 2, 2023	December 15, 2023
Flor has tried everything to make her little flower grow, but nothing works. The detectives investigate what they can do to make it bloom.
21	"Melhor Brinquedo do Mundo"	December 2, 2023	December 18, 2023
While playing in the playground, the detectives find a bucket of clothespins, but they don't know what they're for. The trio begins to investigate and discovers the best toy in the world.
22	"Explosão de Sabores"	December 2, 2023	December 18, 2023
After a frightening bang, the detectives discover that the noise came from Max's belly. Together with Brisa and Berenice, they decide to cure Max's hunger with lots of music.: Note: First musical episode.
23	"Dançar É Pura Magia"	December 2, 2023	December 19, 2023
Brisa and Berenice perform teleportation spells. Based on the sounds of this magic, the detectives decide to play with lots of music and dancing alongside the little witches.: Note: Second musical episode.
24	"Cantinhos do Prédio Azul"	December 2, 2023	December 19, 2023
Flor is drawing a map of the blue building and the question arises as to whether the children really know all the places in the building. The detectives investigate with lots of music and dancing.: Note: Third musical episode.
25	"Cada um com Seu Jeitinho"	December 2, 2023	December 20, 2023
The detectives and the little witches are in the courtyard, when the Building announces that it is time for each one to do their activities. The children comment on the differences in each one's life.: Note: Fourth musical episode.
26	"Eu Sou D.P.A."	December 2, 2023	December 20, 2023
The detectives are all investigating the reception with their magnifying glasses, each one in a corner, very concentrated. With lots of music and dancing, they sing about the importance of being a D.P.A. (Detetives do Prédio Azul): Note: Fifth and final musical episode.
