= Punch Punch Forever! =

Adult animated web series

- Genre: Action-adventure; Animated sitcom; Black comedy; Comedy; Science fantasy; Surreal comedy; Satire; Action
- Created by: Speedoru
- Written by: Speedoru
- Directed by: Speedoru
- Voices of: Hinako Mori; Akari Una; Chihaya Hanai; Emi Miyajima
- Countries of origin: Ireland; Japan
- Original languages: Japanese; English
- No. of seasons: 1
- No. of episodes: 4

Production
- Executive producer: Speedoru
- Producer: Speedoru
- Running time: 8–12 minutes

Original release
- Network: YouTube; Newgrounds
- Release: July 15, 2023 – present

Punch Punch Forever! (Japanese: パンチパンチフォーエバー, Hepburn: Panchi Panchi Fōebā) is an independent adult animated web series created, written, and directed by Speedoru. The series premiered online in July 15, 2023 and is produced in Japanese with English subtitles. It is notable for its homage to 1990s shōnen anime aesthetics, VHS-style presentation, surreal humour, and short-form episodic fight sequences.

== Premise ==
Gogo Matsumoto, an 11-year-old martial arts prodigy, competes in a martial arts tournament pitting humans against demons from another realm. She is helped by her half-demon older sister, Nono; her mama, Mama; and her cool pet frog, Coolfrog.

== Voice cast ==
=== Main ===
- Hinako Mori as Gogo Matsumoto
- Misaki Tatekawa as Nono Matsumoto
- Akari Una as Mamá Matsumoto

=== Recurring ===
- Chihaya Hanai as Emperor Koro
- Kasumi Seki as Jin

=== Guest ===
==== Season 1 ====
- Kitan Homuraya as Geison
- Emi Miyajima as Geiko

== Episodes ==
No. in season	Title	Directed by	Written by	Original release date
1	"Pilot"	Speedoru	Story by : Speedoru; Teleplay by : Speedoru	July 15, 2023
2	"My Little Slasher"	Speedoru	Story by : Speedoru; Teleplay by : Speedoru	June 14, 2024
3	"Toothless Aggression"	Speedoru	Story by : Speedoru; Teleplay by : Speedoru	June 6, 2025
4	"Christmas Panic!"	Speedoru	Story by : Speedoru; Teleplay by : Speedoru	October 20, 2025

== Production ==
The series is independently produced by Speedoru, who handles the majority of creative duties including direction, writing, and voice work coordination. Episodes are distributed online via platforms such as YouTube and Newgrounds. The production is characterised by a low-budget but deliberate retro presentation — aspect ratio and visual artefacts simulate older VHS releases, and faux in-universe sponsor cards and bumpers are often used to reinforce the retro aesthetic.

== Style and themes ==
Punch Punch Forever! combines parody and pastiche of classic shōnen and 1990s martial-arts anime with contemporary internet-era humour. Common stylistic elements include exaggerated fight choreography, abrupt tonal shifts between slapstick and graphic physical comedy, and frequent use of retro visual effects (e.g. scan lines, tape wobble, 4:3 framing). Themes include family bonds, coming-of-age under extreme circumstances, and satirical takes on tournament-fighting tropes.

== Reception ==
The series has attracted a cult following online. Viewers and commentators have praised its animation timing, fight staging, and spoofing of genre conventions, while some critiques note the limited episode cadence typical of independent web animation.

== See also ==
- OK K.O.! Let's Be Heroes
