= OK K.O.! Let's Be Heroes =

American animated web and television series

- Genre: Action; Adventure; Comedy; Superhero
- Created by: Ian Jones-Quartey
- Based on: Lakewood Plaza Turbo by Ian Jones-Quartey
- Story by: Ian Jones-Quartey; Toby Jones; Erin Shade; Dave Tennant
- Voices of: Stephanie Nadolny; Courtenay Taylor; Ashly Burch; Ian Jones-Quartey; David Herman; Kate Flannery; Jim Cummings
- Theme music composer: Mint Potion Studios
- Opening theme: "Let's Watch the Show" by Mint Potion Studios
- Ending theme: "It's Only Magic" by Rebecca Sugar
- Composer: Mint Potion Studios
- Country of origin: United States
- No. of seasons: 3
- No. of episodes: 112 (list of episodes)

Production
- Executive producers: Ian Jones-Quartey; Toby Jones; Jennifer Pelphrey; Tramm Wigzell; Brian A. Miller; Rob Sorcher; Conrad Montgomery
- Editor: Mattaniah Adams
- Running time: 11 minutes (regular); 22 minutes (specials)
- Production company: Cartoon Network Studios

Original release
- Network: Cartoon Network
- Release: August 1, 2017 – September 6, 2019

OK K.O.! Let's Be Heroes is an American animated web and television series created by Ian Jones-Quartey for Cartoon Network. The show is based on Jones-Quartey's pilot Lakewood Plaza Turbo, which was released as part of Cartoon Network's 2013 Summer Shorts project. It was produced by Cartoon Network Studios. The web series premiered on Cartoon Network's YouTube channel and on Cartoon Network Video on February 4, 2016. On March 9, 2017, nearly four years after the original webisodes premiere, Cartoon Network announced that the television series had been greenlit, and it premiered on August 1, 2017. The opening sequence was storyboarded by Japanese artist Hiroyuki Imaishi, co-founder of Studio Trigger.

On December 4, 2017, the series was confirmed to be renewed for a second season, which premiered on March 18, 2018. A third and final season, which was announced on June 26, 2019, premiered on July 7, 2019; the final episode aired on September 6, 2019. The show was available to stream on Hulu until it was removed in October 2024; It was also available on HBO Max, but was one of several shows removed in August 2022 as a result of the Warner Bros. Discovery merger.

== Premise ==
OK K.O.! Let's Be Heroes is set in the retro-futuristic year of 201X. The series follows the titular character, K.O., and his efforts to become the world's greatest hero while working at Gar's Bodega (run by Mr. Gar), a hero supply shop in Lakewood Plaza Turbo. Alongside him are his best friends and coworkers Radicles, an egotistical alien, and Enid, a level-headed big-sister-like ninja, as well as other heroes who work in the area.

== Voice cast ==
- Courtenay Taylor as K.O., T.K.O., Blue Power, Whistle, Baby Shannon, Hon Dew
- Ashly Burch as Enid Mettle (series and shorts), Gladys, Ms. Mummy, Foxy, Cherry, Ball Monster, Rippy Roo, Baby Teeth, Glitter Starlight, Tumbles, Plazamo ("Dark Plaza"), Hamster, Classmate 1 & 2 ("You're a Good Friend, KO!")
- Ian Jones-Quartey as Radicles X, Darrell, Crinkly Wrinkly, Cookie Man, Pird (episode 11), Frat Boy 2, Gregg, Point Trooper, Drone ("Mystery Sleepover"), URL, Gauntlet, Pickle, Nerd 2, Janner
- David Herman as Mr. Gar, Brandon, Jethro, Mad Sam, Beardo, Rat, Steamborg Robot, Young Crinkly Wrinkly, Action News Narrator, Heroic Guy, Boxgar, Dragon
- Kate Flannery as Carol, Gertie (in the pilot)
- Jim Cummings as Lord Boxman, Boxman Jr., Gar-Man, Mecha-Maw, Robbie
- Melissa Fahn as Dendy, Mikayla, Krissa, Monkey, Genesis
- Kari Wahlgren as Shannon, Chillcat, Tumbles, Mrs. Gnarlio, Vormulax, Kid, P.O.I.N.T. HQ, Barista Pup, Wavezilla, Grandma
- Robbie Daymond as Raymond, Co-Bruh, Rex, Announcer ("Beach Episode")
- Chris Niosi as Nick Army, Pird, Ernesto, Neil, Face of Fear, Male Lead, Soloist, Anxious Ricky, Wistful Pete, Drone
- Reshma Shetty as Elodie
- Mary Elizabeth McGlynn as Dynamite Watkins, Miss Quantum, Snake
- Cole Sanchez as Colewort, Topher, Driver, Plaque, Point Trooper
- Melissa Villaseñor as Potato, Punching Judy, Drupe, Gertie, Ginger, Mega Football Baby, Shy Ninja, Biki, Phoebe, Punching Trudy
- Kali Hawk as Red Action
- Steven Ogg as Professor Venomous/Laserblast/Shadowy Figure
- Lara Jill Miller as Fink, Koala Princess, Cantalop, Truffles

In addition, Stephanie Nadolny played K.O. and Gladys in the pilot and several episodes of the first season, and Mena Suvari portrayed Enid in the pilot.

== Episodes ==
Season	Episodes	Originally released	
Season	Episodes	First released	Last released
Pilot		May 21, 2013	
Webisodes	13	February 4, 2016	August 2, 2017
1	52	August 1, 2017	April 6, 2018
2	40	March 19, 2018	June 30, 2019
3	20	July 7, 2019	September 6, 2019

== Production ==
The pilot, "Lakewood Plaza Turbo", aired in 2013 (on Cartoon Network's YouTube channel and on Cartoon Network Video on February 4, 2016), and the show was announced in March 2017, with the first episode airing on August 1. To promote OK K.O.! Let's Be Heroes, Cartoon Network's Chief Content Officer Rob Sorcher hinted many times that it would become a full series. On March 9, 2017 on PlayStation's Blog, Chris Waldron, the VP of Games & Digital Products for Cartoon Network, announced a series in the works, along with a video game. It was announced as part of a slate of animations for the 2017-2018 season, alongside new series such as Craig of the Creek and Summer Camp Island, and recurring series. In September 2017, Jones-Quartey said that Dobbin Center was the inspiration for the Lakewood Plaza, while Boxmore represented Columbia Crossing, a strip mall which opened in 1997. He also stated that each episode takes nine months to work on "from start to finish", and stated that the series spoke to kids who are interested in superheroes, "special powers" and enjoy drawing.

In August 2021, Ian Jones-Quartey told Insider that in hiring people for the show, he avoided relying on a trusted network of people, prioritizing finding a diverse group of people, doing many open calls, with the studio having a database with which they "sort of cold emailed people", then asking people to come in after looking at what they had done in the past.

=== Animation and design ===
The show was traditionally animated in South Korea by Digital eMation and Sunmin Image Pictures. Unlike many animated programs, which are inked on paper and then scanned for coloring, OK K.O.! was drawn in pencil. The animators pencil each frame on paper using a light table, and then color them digitally on a layer beneath the transparent line work, to retain a hand-drawn quality. For Jones-Quartey, it was important for the audience to "never forget that these are drawings". This was partially inspired by the first season of The Simpsons. Animation Magazine later stated that the 30-person production team at Cartoon Network's studios that works on the series was "ruled by storyboards", which refers to the show being board-driven rather than script-driven. Diego Molano, later a creator of Victor and Valentino, was a character designer on the series.

=== LGBTQ representation ===
Series creator Ian Jones-Quartey hinted at this in an interview with Den of Geek published a day before the first episode aired, saying those watching it would "be delighted" by the LGBTQ representation in the series. There were LGBTQ characters in the main cast, among supporting characters and other recurring characters. For instance, the series featured two married couples: Lord Boxman and Professor Venomous, two villains, and Joff and Nick Army, two recurring heroes. The series was noted as portraying Boxman and Venomous romantically, and ending with a same-sex wedding between Joff and Army in the series finale "Thank You for Watching the Show" on September 6, 2019. Before the episode aired, Jones-Quartey confirmed Army and Joff as a canon gay couple and Gregg, a minor character, as non-binary. Enid, a bisexual ninja and witch, and Red Action, a lesbian, were recognized by GLAAD as a couple, and kissed in the episode "Red Action 3: Grudgement Day". The series was later recognized by Philadelphia Gay News and Out for its LGBTQ representation.

The show creators also stated that Yellow was possibly Red's ex-girlfriend, with the show's crew calling Enid and Red a "committed couple", and saying their relationship developed "very naturally". Jones-Quartey later said that Red Action and Enid "run a dojo together and kiss". Other reviewers stated that Enid has possible romantic feelings toward Elodie. Additionally, Gregg, a minor character, was confirmed as non-binary by Jones-Quartey, who also confirmed Venomous as bisexual, but not non-binary, and Boxman as pansexual. In October 2020, Jones-Quartey added that Professor Venomous and Lord Boxman of OK K.O.! Let's Be Heroes were married at the end of the series. Jones-Quartey also said that The Hue Troop, which Red was once part of, are all LGBTQ characters. When asked about Radicles' sexuality, Toby Jones, one of the supervising directors, confirmed that Rad is "pretty fluid and I think he understands that about himself".

== Broadcast and home media ==
=== Release ===
OK K.O.! Let's Be Heroes premiered on Cartoon Network on August 1, 2017. The first 6 episodes were released online on June 13, 2017. It also aired on sister network Boomerang from August 7 to September 1, 2017. It was also featured at the 2017 San Diego Comic-Con. On December 7, 2017, the series was renewed for a second season. In early 2018, Let's Play Heroes, a video game adaptation of the series premiered. The second season premiered on March 19, 2018. On October 8, 2018, a crossover episode entitled "Crossover Nexus" between characters in OK K.O.! Let's Be Heroes, Steven Universe, Ben 10, and Teen Titans Go! aired. On July 9, 2019, the third and final season of OK K.O.! Let's Be Heroes began airing on Cartoon Network. On August 4, 2019, the episode "Let's Meet Sonic" aired, a crossover episode with characters from Sonic the Hedgehog. On August 6, 2019, Ian Jones-Quartey announced that Cartoon Network opted to not renew the show for a fourth season. The series finale aired on September 6, 2019.

=== Streaming ===
On September 1, 2020, the entire series became available on HBO Max. On August 17, 2022, it was announced that the platform would be removing several series, including OK K.O.! Let's Be Heroes. All videos and tweets of the show published by Cartoon Network were taken down shortly after. Creator Ian Jones-Quartey was not informed of the reason for the content removal. As of August 2022, all episodes from the show were available on Hulu. The show was removed in September 2024. The show was formerly available for digital purchase on Vudu, Apple TV, and Amazon Prime Video; the show began to be removed from these platforms in October 2023.

=== Home media ===
OK K.O.! Let's Be Heroes home video releases
Season		Episodes	Release dates	
Season		Episodes	United States	Australia
1	2017–18	19 (US) 49 (Australia)	Volume 1: T.K.O.: July 17, 2018; Episodes: "Let's Be Heroes" – "We Messed Up" • "We've Got Pests" – "We're Captured" • "T.K.O." – "We've Got Fleas" • "Glory Days" – "Parents' Day" • "Villains' Night Out" • "Villains' Night In" • "Let's Not Be Skeletons" • "Action News"	November 20, 2019 Complete season included

== Video games ==
A mobile game, OK K.O.! Lakewood Plaza Turbo, was launched on Android and iOS on February 4, 2016 as a free game for those platforms. It is a beat 'em up developed by Double Stallion Games and published by Cartoon Network Games. The game's original score was composed by Mathieu Lavoie and FX Dupas at Vibe Avenue in Montreal, Canada. The game is no longer available.

Capybara Games developed a video game based on the show for the PlayStation 4, Xbox One, and Windows. Entitled OK K.O.! Let's Play Heroes, it was released on January 23, 2018, and a Nintendo Switch port was released on October 30, 2018. The game was delisted in December 2024.

== Reception ==
=== Critical reception ===
The series was received positively. Melissa Camacho of Common Sense Media described the series as fun, with a "hard-working wannabe hero" but warned of cartoon violence. She also called the series "quirky", said it has "lots of positive messages" and "clever moments", with some scenes understood more by young tweens rather than small children.

Shamus Kelley of Den of Geek said that "The show's humor is mostly very strong. While some of it is situational, the series so far heavily relies on sight gags. Most of these are very well executed and feature some wonderfully loose animation". And he argues that "if the show doesn't delve into that kind of world building, it still has the potential to be a zany comedy with a ton of heart that's a cut above the rest." And at the end he said that "Many other series on Cartoon Network, Steven Universe and We Bare Bears especially, took more than a season to really find their footing and I whole heartedly believe OK K.O.!: Let's Be Heroes will be worth the long-term investment." Praise has been given to the series' overarching storyline and character writing, as well as for its LGBTQ representation.

=== Awards and nominations ===
Year	Award	Category	Nominee(s)	Result	Ref.
2018	Nominee BTVA Television Voice Acting Award	Best Vocal Ensemble in a New Television Series	Stephanie Nadolny, Courtenay Taylor, Ashly Burch, Ian Jones-Quartey, David Herman, Kate Flannery, Melissa Villaseñor, Ben Jones, Kari Wahlgren, Marina Sirtis,	Nominated	
2018	Nominee BTVA Television Voice Acting Award	"Best Female Lead Vocal Performance in a Television Series" for role as: Enid	Ashly Burch	Nominated	
2018	Nominee BTVA Television Voice Acting Award	"Best Male Vocal Performance in a Television Series in a Guest Role" for role as: Captain Planet	David Coburn	Nominated	
2018	Nominee BTVA Television Voice Acting Award	"Best Female Vocal Performance in a Television Series in a Guest Role" for role as: Dr. Blight	Tessa Auberjonois	Nominated	

== See also ==
- Punch Punch Forever!
