= Copa Studio =

Brazilian animation studio

- Industry: Animation
- Founded: 2009; 17 years ago
- Headquarters: Rio de Janeiro, Brazil
- Key people: Zé Brandão; Rodrigo Martins; Felipe Tavares
- Products: Animated series
- Website: www.copastudio.com

Copa Studio is a Brazilian animation studio based in Rio de Janeiro, founded in 2009. Its productions include Trunk Train (originally for TV Cultura and TV Brasil), Haunted Tales for Wicked Kids and Jorel's Brother for Cartoon Network, and Gigablaster for Gloob, as well as some movies and television specials.

== Series ==
- Kiara e os Luminitos (2009)
- Trunk Train (Tromba Trem) (2010–17)
- Haunted Tales for Wicked Kids (Historietas Assombradas (para Crianças Malcriadas)) (2013–16)
- Jorel's Brother (O Irmão do Jorel) (2014–present)
- Biduzidos (2018)
- Mini Mini (As Microaventuras de Tito e Muda) (2018–present)
- Ico Bit Zip (2019–present)
- Giga Blaster (2019–present)
- My Friend Twiga (Tuiga) (2019–present)
- Wake Up, Carlo! (Acorda, Carlo!) (2023)
- D.P.A. Mini (2023–present)

== Others ==
- Um Conto de Páscoa (2011) - TV special based in Monica and Friends.
- Haunted Tales - The Movie (Historietas Assombradas - O Filme) (2017)
- My Little Pony: The Movie (2017) - Animation services
- Johnny Test (2021) - Animation services
- Trunk Train: The Movie (Tromba Trem - O Filme) (2022)
