= Santo vs The Clones =

- Genre: Superhero
- Created by: Carlo Olivares Paganoni
- Developed by: El Hijo del Santo
- Written by: Carlo Olivares Paganoni
- Directed by: Carlo Olivares Paganoni
- Creative director: Fernando Semenzato
- Voices of: (See Voice cast)
- Country of origin: Mexico
- Original language: Spanish
- No. of episodes: 5

Production
- Executive producers: Carlo Olivares Paganoni; Manuel Cuan, Barry Koch, and Hernán La Greca (for Cartoon Network Latin America)
- Producer: Adolfo Díaz
- Editors: James Powell; Jesenko Fazlagic
- Running time: 2–3 minutes
- Production companies: LMT Animation Studio; HookUp Animation (main title only); Cartoon Network Producciones

Original release
- Network: Cartoon Network (Mexico)
- Release: October 27 – November 24, 2004

Santo vs The Clones (Spanish: Santo Contra Los Clones) is a 2004 Cartoon Network Latin American original animated series based on the wrestler El Santo. It consists of five short episodes, which were aired every Wednesday nights at 8:00 PM in Mexico, and also in other Latin American countries. It was created by Carlo Olivares Paganoni, a filmmaker, advertising worker, and cartoonist who previously created the Cartoon Network pilot Bobots. The series was developed by wrestler El Hijo del Santo, El Santo's son.

== Synopsis ==
Set in Mexico City, Santo vs The Clones follows the adventures of the homonym wrestler as a superhero who must try to stop the plans of Dr. Clone, an evil scientist, who which is determined to kill him and simultaneously dominate the world by creating clones of his old enemies (through their DNA).

== Voice cast ==
- Daniel Giménez Cacho – Dr. Clone
- Omar Chaparro – Adenaido
- Jimmy Guthrie – Frankus
- Gabriela Guzmán – Diana
- Flavio Medina – Adrián
- Alberto Pedrel – Santo
- Arturo Rivera – The Announcer
- Héctor Sáez – The Professor
- Julio Vega – Jardinero
- Gabriela Willert – Chiquis

== Episodes ==
No.	Title	Original release date
1	"Las Lobas Contra El D.F." / "The She-Wolves vs. The D.F."	27 October 2004
2	"Santo Contra el Regreso de Las Momias" / "Santo vs. the Return of The Mummies"	3 November 2004
3	"El Pelo en la Camisa del Jardinero" / "The Hair on the Gardener's Shirt"	10 November 2004
4	"El Regreso de Las Vampiras" / "The Return of The Vampires"	17 November 2004
5	"Santo Contra Santo" / "Santo vs. Santo"	24 November 2004

== Canceled American show ==
In 2007, it was announced that an international version of the series was in development at Cartoon Network Studios. In 2008, the series was released as an unaired short pilot titled Mask of Santo. Carlo Olivares Paganoni and El Hijo del Santo returned as creator and developer, respectively.

No.	Title	Directed by	Written by	Original release date
1	"Mask of Santo"	Tyree Dillihay	Carlo Olivares Paganoni	2008
