= G4 Media (TV company) =

American media corporation

G4 Media, LLC was an in-name only unit of NBCUniversal Television and Streaming which maintained the programming of G4, a defunct 24-hour cable and satellite channel dedicated to video games, along with its former competitor, TechTV/ZDTV. NBCUniversal held a controlling interest in G4 Media, with Dish Network holding a minority interest of approximately 12% because its former parent company held a minority interest in TechTV and owned Dish Network. Prior to the Comcast/NBCUniversal merger, Comcast owned the network, previously named G4 Media, Inc.

== History ==
In early 2004, G4 Media (at the time owned entirely by Comcast) announced the purchase of a controlling interest in TechTV. On May 28, 2004, G4 and TechTV merged into a hybrid network called G4techTV. EchoStar (which held a minority interest in TechTV and owned Dish Network) retained partial ownership of the combined entity.

The new network leaned more toward the gaming programming that was featured on G4 than the technology side that was featured on TechTV, prompting petitions and complaints from disaffected TechTV fans. On February 15, 2005, TechTV was officially dropped from the network name in the United States, leaving only three TechTV shows, X-Play, Anime Unleashed (removed indefinitely as of March 2006) and The Screen Savers (later rebranded as Attack of the Show!). The channel's programming direction eventually was directed towards men with mostly acquired programs mixed with several original productions.

G4 Media used to hold a 33.3% minority interest in G4's Canadian counterpart.

On October 13, 2006, Comcast announced that it will consolidate G4, bringing it, E!, and the Style Network into a new combined entity later known as the Comcast Entertainment Group. G4's executive staff moved into E!'s Los Angeles offices and layoffs occurred. E! likewise began using G4's former facility to produce their own content, including the early seasons of Chelsea Lately.

There had been reports of G4TV rebranding itself in Summer 2013 into an upscale men's channel previous to the recent programming changes. It was announced on December 7, 2012, that G4 will in fact be rebranded as the Esquire Network (previously Esquire Channel) after NBCUniversal closed a deal with Hearst Corporation (the owner of Esquire). Any and all in-house productions for the G4 network have ended as of January 23, with the exception of American Ninja Warrior in the summer of 2013 after the pushback of the Esquire Network launch to September 23, 2013. Due to its DirecTV coverage, the Style Network was chosen as the slot for Esquire Network. G4 Media, and its main network are expected to "remain as is for the foreseeable future, though it's highly unlikely the company will invest in more original programming."

Dish Network, which was a part owner of G4 Media, dropped the network from its lineup on November 1, 2013.

=== G4 Media becomes defunct, so does G4 ===
After the fifth season of American Ninja Warrior was completed, control of production for the series for future seasons shifted from G4 Media to NBCUniversal Television, leaving G4 Media as a defunct production company maintaining the archives of TechTV and G4 within the Comcast organization and licensing the G4 trademark to their Canadian counterpart.

According to a statement sent by NBCUniversal Cable to the remaining providers carrying the network, G4 would end all operations on November 30, 2014,. On December 31, 2014, at 11:59 pm EST, G4 ceased broadcasting.

=== Revival ===
On July 24, 2020, the Twitter accounts of G4TV and G4's Attack of the Show! and X-Play, reactivated to post a teaser video of a G4 revival in some form, slated for 2021. The teasers were timed for Comic-Con@Home, the first virtual streaming edition of the annual fan convention, San Diego Comic-Con (which was one of many events that were canceled due to the ongoing COVID-19 pandemic). Consequently, G4's website reopened as a playable game of Pong (which if won, redirects to a mailing list sign up for updates), once again reflecting back to the network's original launch in 2002 and their shutdown in 2014.

On November 16, 2020, the G4 channel space was reactivated, and G4 announced that the revival will be starting off with a special named A Very Special G4 Holiday Reunion Special. Hosted by Ron Funches, the special will reunite cast members of the original G4 and reminisce the memories they had with the network. The special aired on November 24 via Twitch and YouTube. SYFY also aired the special three days later, on November 27. The network officially relaunched nearly a year later on November 16, 2021, with the channel now operating under Comcast Spectacor, only for it to close again on November 18, 2022.

== Programs produced by G4 Media ==
- 2 Months 2 Million (2009)
- American Ninja Warrior (2009–2013, transferred to Esquire Network; later, to NBC)
- Arena (2002–2005)
- Attack of the Show! (2005–2022)
- Blister (2002–2005)
- Bomb Patrol Afghanistan (2011–2012)
- Campus PD (2009–2012)
- Cheat! (2002–2009)
- Code Monkeys (2007–2008)
- Cinematech (2002–2007)
- Filter (2002–2006)
- G4 Underground (2009)
- G4tv.com (2002–2005)
- Game Makers (2002–2005)
- Hurl! (2008–2009)
- Human Wrecking Balls (2008–2010)
- Icons (2002–2006)
- The International Sexy Ladies Show (2009–2010)
- It's Effin' Science (2010)
- Jump City: Seattle (2011)
- Player$ (2002–2004)
- Portal (2002–2004)
- Pulse (2002–2004)
- Proving Ground (2011)
- Scott the Woz (2021–2022)
- The Screen Savers (2004–2005, transferred from TechTV)
- Spaceballs: The Animated Series (2008)
- That's Tough (2010)
- Top 100 Video Games of All Time (2012 TV special)
- Web Soup (2009–2011)
- Wired For Sex (2008, transferred from TechTV)
- X-Play (2004–2022, transferred from TechTV)
- A Very Special G4 Holiday Reunion Special (2020)
