= G4techTV =

American television network

- Country: United States
- Headquarters: Los Angeles, California

Ownership
- Owner: G4 Media

History
- Launched: May 28, 2004; 22 years ago
- Replaced: TechTV
- Closed: February 15, 2005; 21 years ago
- Replaced by: G4

G4techTV was a short-lived American cable and satellite television network that operated from May 28, 2004 to February 15, 2005, formed by the merger of Comcast-owned G4, a channel focused on video games and gamer culture, and TechTV, a network dedicated to technology and interactive content. G4 was launched in 2002 and targeted young male viewers interested in video games, while TechTV, established in 1998, covered emerging technologies, gadgets, and internet culture. Comcast's acquisition of TechTV from Vulcan Ventures was announced on March 25, 2004, with the combined network under the leadership of G4 CEO Charles Hirschhorn. By early 2005, G4techTV underwent a rebranding back to simply G4 to sharpen its focus on video gaming and shift away from broader tech topics to increase appeal to G4's demographic. The channel's Canadian version, which launched simultaneously with the American channel, was similarly rebranded to the Canadian version of G4, which would outlast its American counterpart.

== Background ==
TechTV originated from ZDTV, a cable television network launched on May 11, 1998, by Ziff-Davis as the first 24-hour channel dedicated to computers, technology, and the internet. ZDTV initially offered programming centered on consumer technology reviews, gadget demonstrations, and emerging internet culture, aiming to appeal to tech-savvy viewers during the height of the dot-com boom. Paul Allen's Vulcan Ventures had previously invested $54 million for a 33% stake in ZDTV in November 1998. In November 1999, Ziff-Davis agreed to sell its remaining 64% stake to Vulcan Ventures for $204.8 million, with the transaction completing on January 21, 2000. This acquisition led to a rebranding to TechTV on August 21, 2000, to broaden its appeal beyond niche computing topics. In September 2001, the network launched TechTV Canada. Throughout 2003, TechTV expanded its programming to include more lifestyle-oriented tech content. In March 2004, Comcast acquired TechTV for an estimated $300 million, paving the way for its merger with G4. By the time of the sale, TechTV was available in approximately 43 million households.

G4 was launched on April 24, 2002 by Comcast as a 24-hour cable television network dedicated exclusively to video games and interactive entertainment, specifically targeting a demographic of viewers aged 12 to 34. It was initially distributed on Comcast systems, reaching about three million subscribers at launch.

== History ==
On March 25, 2004, Comcast announced an agreement to acquire TechTV from Allen, in a deal valued at approximately $300 million (equivalent to $511.36 million in 2025), as well as its upcoming merger of the network with G4. Around May 6, TechTV announced the termination of 285 employees from its San Francisco office by July 16, allowing approximately 80 to 100 employees to transition to G4's main office in Los Angeles if they agreed to relocate there. The acquisition was completed on May 10, 2004, and the combined network launched on May 28. On June 8, Time Warner Cable dropped the network from its systems in New York and New Jersey, explaining they did not have an agreement to carry G4 programming in those states.

On January 11, 2005, CEO Charles Hirschhorn announced that, effective February 15, G4techTV's name would revert to G4 and receive a new presentation and programming primarily targeting male gamers aged 12–34. Hirschhorn intended to veer the network away from TechTV's older tech audience in favor of younger male viewers, and according to insiders, the "techTV" suffix was a temporary concession to cable operators, with a complete G4 brand being the ultimate goal. James Hibberd of TelevisionWeek, in hindsight, equated the merger to a real estate transaction to increase G4's circulation.

== G4techTV Canada ==
G4techTV Canada was launched on May 28, 2004, as a rebranding of the existing TechTV Canada channel in response to the merger of the American TechTV and G4 networks. This adaptation operated as a joint venture between Rogers Broadcasting, Shaw Communications, and G4 Media. Following the 2004 cancellation of Call for Help in the United States, the channel aired a Toronto-produced revival beginning in August 2004. In 2007, the program was retitled The Lab with Leo Laporte, and production was moved to Greedy Productions in Vancouver. In mid-2009, the channel underwent another rebranding to simply G4 Canada, dropping the "techTV" suffix and outlasting the original American G4 network, which ceased operations in 2014; G4 Canada itself ended on August 31, 2017.

== Programs ==
The following is a partial list of programs aired by G4techTV.

=== Original programming ===
- Arena – a weekly program in which multiplayer action game teams competed against each other in LAN parties, featuring game highlights, player interviews, and play-by-play commentary.
- Blister – a weekly program that provided in-depth coverage of various titles from the action genre, including shooters, driving games, platformers, action-adventure, and horror games.
- Cheat! – a weekly program that provided game strategy walkthroughs, tips for overcoming challenging sections, hidden secrets, tricks, and cheat codes.
- Cinematech – a weekly program that showcased cinematics, intro sequences, and trailers from high-end video games.
- Eye Drops – a weekly showcase of computer-animated shorts.
- Filter – a weekly video game countdown show that ranked the best or worst in the video game world based on votes from G4techTV viewers, featuring game clips, viewer e-mail, and man-on-the-street interviews.
- Fresh Gear – a weekly program that reviewed technological gadgets.
- G4techTV Specials – occasional special programs featuring unique and exceptional content from G4techTV, ranging from buyers' guides to coverage of distinctive gaming events.
- G4tv.com – a weekly interactive talk show that collaborated with the g4techtv.com website to facilitate conversation, outspoken opinions, and an uncensored look at what visitors were playing. Viewers influenced show content through polls, ratings, and other interactive tools.
- Game Gods – a weekly program that profiled the developers and creators of popular video games, exploring their work, triumphs, failures, inspirations, and ongoing projects.
- Game On – a hybrid game show, travel show, and reality program that followed co-hosts Matt Gallant and Randy Kagan as they visited video gaming meccas and landmarks across the United States and competed against each other, special guests, and the public in video game-related challenges.
- Game Sauce – a weekly program that provided reviews, previews, and cheats for contemporary video games.
- Hi-Score – a gaming quiz show in which contestants competed head-to-head to determine who possessed greater gaming knowledge and prowess.
- Icons – a documentary series that provided in-depth coverage of the video game industry, featuring behind-the-scenes looks at game developers, profiles of industry giants and notorious figures, and retrospectives on the history of notable games.
- Invent This! – a weekly prime-time program that showcased inventors.
- Judgment Day – a weekly program that provided reviews of contemporary video games and hardware across all platforms.
- Nerd Nation – a weekly prime-time program that focused on nerd sub-cultures.
- Players – a weekly program that profiled rich, famous, unique, and interesting personalities in the gaming world.
- Portal – a program that explored massively multiplayer online games.
- Pulse – a weekly news program that provided headlines and information about video games, the companies, and the people behind them.
- The Screen Savers – a prime-time program that covered the latest computing products and demonstrated their effective use at home and the workplace.
- Secret, Strange & True – a program that examined stories at the intersection of science, technology, and human ingenuity.
- Sweat – a weekly program that highlighted sports video games, profiled the athletes, designers, and producers involved, and provided behind-the-scenes insights, gameplay tips, and competitive comparisons between different game formats.
- Unscrewed with Martin Sargent – a daily showcase of "the darker, funnier, sexier world of technology and the Internet".
- X-Play – a weekly program that provided reviews, tips and tricks, and previews for contemporary video games.

=== Acquired programming ===
- 10 Play
- Anime Unleashed – a programming block of science fiction anime.
  - Betterman
  - Crest of the Stars
  - Dual! Parallel Trouble Adventure
  - Gad Guard
  - Geneshaft
  - Gungrave
  - Last Exile
  - Magical Shopping Arcade Abenobashi
  - R.O.D the TV
- Body Hits
- The Electric Playground
- Future Fighting Machines
- Gamer.tv
- Robot Wars
- Thunderbirds
