= Wade Beckett =

American film producer

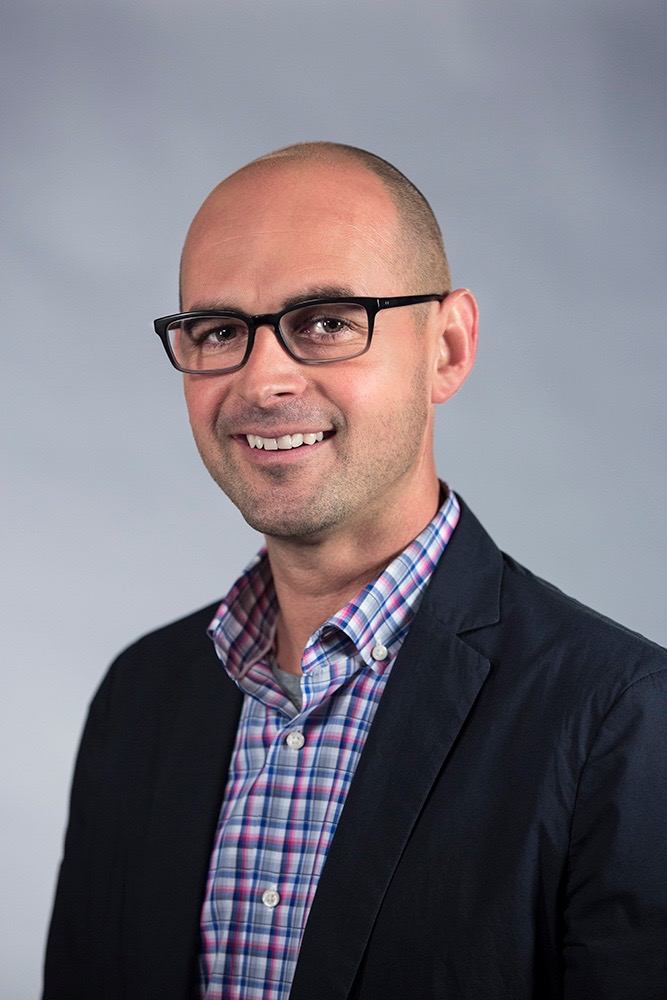

Wade Beckett is a TV, film and digital producer who currently serves as Chief Programming Officer and Sr. Vice President of Production, at Fusion - a Disney/ABC & Univision joint venture. Beckett supervises Programming, Development and Production at Fusion—including the network's non-scripted series, documentaries & specials, and live events. Fusion series include The Chris Gethard Show, hosted by Chris Gethard and executive produced by Will Ferrell, Adam McKay, Zach Galifianakis (co-produced by Funny or Die), My Selfie Life, (co-produced with NERD), No, You Shut Up!, hosted by Paul F Tompkins (co-produced with The Jim Henson Company), America with Jorge Ramos, hosted by eight-time Emmy winner Jorge Ramos, Real Future, Drug Wars, Like, Share, Die (co-produced with Mondo Media) and The Dan LeBatard Show which is simulcasted with ESPN.

== Early life and education ==
He was born in Fresno, California. He graduated from San Francisco State University with a degree in Cinema.

== Career ==
Before joining FUSION, Beckett served as the Showrunner for ESPN's SportsNation, hosted by Charissa Thompson, Max Kellerman and Marcellus Wiley. In 2012 Beckett successfully transitioned the daily show from ESPN's Bristol headquarters to Los Angeles. The program featured John Cena, The Sklar Brothers, and ESPN Radio's Ben Lyons as frequent guest hosts. SportsNation was among the leaders at ESPN in social media engagement with over 4 million followers on Twitter, second only to the iconic SportsCenter brand.

Prior to ESPN, Beckett spent 8 years as a key executive at NBCUniversal's G4 network. While there he created and oversaw a number of studio and field-based programs including the biography show Icons, the 5-hour series "Top 100 Video Games of All-Time" featuring Nolan North and "X-Play" one of the television's longest-running shows about video games. Beckett also produced G4's yearly live broadcasts as an Executive Producer of E3 Live and Comic Con Live shows as well as "Training Camp with Eddie George" and "Filter with Beth O."

During his tenure at G4, he produced over 1,000 episodes and more than 25 special live events, including E3 LIVE, X-Play Live from Comic Con, Tokyo Game Show, Games Com Leipzig, All Access: Penny Arcade Expo, X-Play: Game Developers Conference Live, Countdown to the Xbox 360 LIVE, and more.

Prior to serving as Executive Producer at Comcast and NBCUniversal, Beckett held positions with ZDTV, TechTV, DreamWorks, NBC's Peter Engel Productions, TV Guide Channel, and CinemaLine.

He is a member of the Producers Guild of America.

== Personal life ==
Beckett is married to Madeline Olin, a botanist from Southern California.
