= Martin Sargent =

American television host (b. 1975)

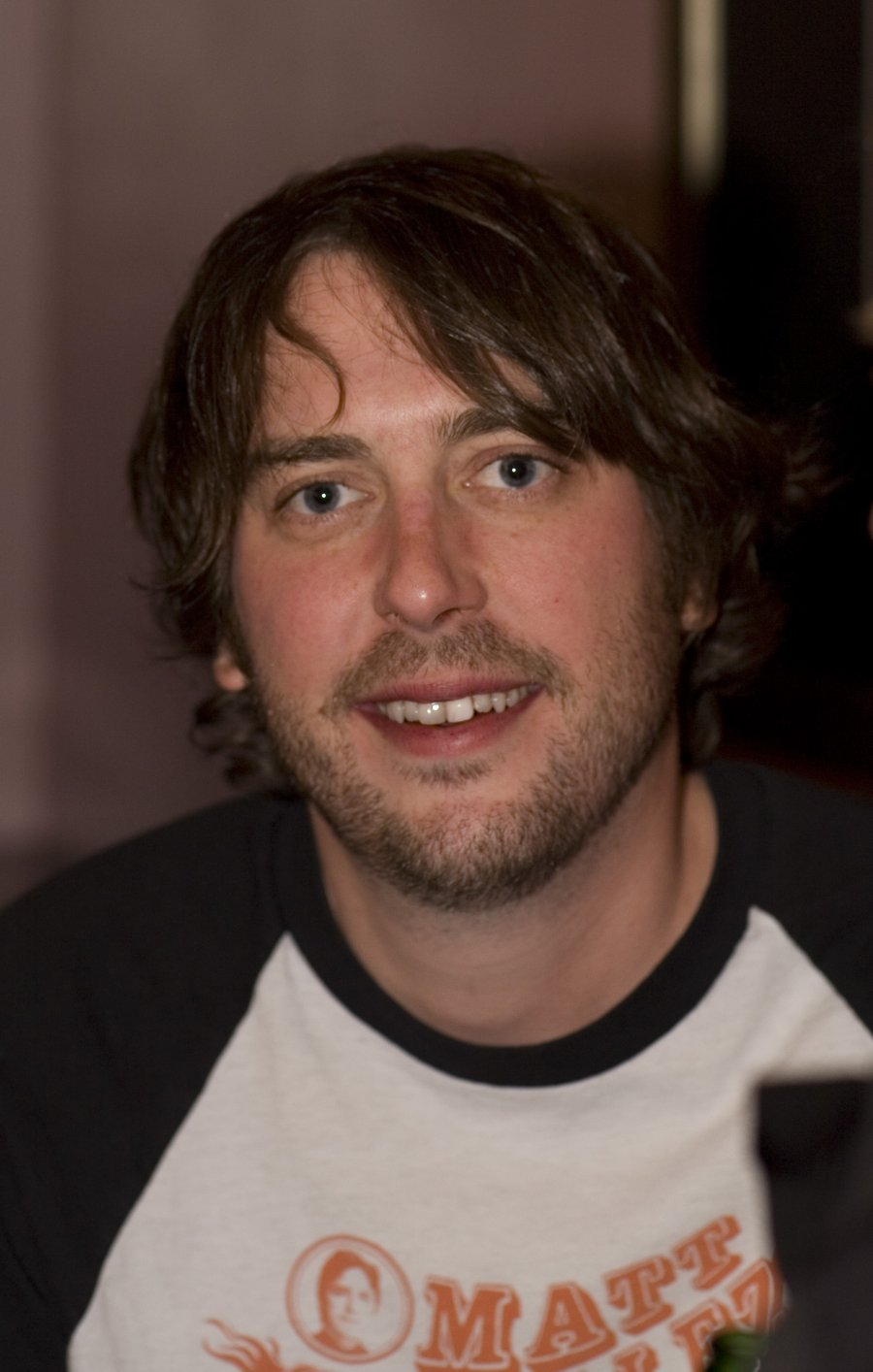
- Sargent in 2007
- Born: 1974 or 1975 (age 50–51); Spencerport, New York, U.S.
- Education: Cornell University
- Occupation: Television personality

Martin Sargent (born 1974 or 1975) is an American television personality and was co-host of the This WEEK in FUN podcast with Sarah Lane. He is most well known from his time as a Segment Producer on TechTV's The Screen Savers and later as the host of his own late night talk show Unscrewed with Martin Sargent.

== Life and career ==
Sargent was born in Spencerport, New York, where his father worked at Kodak and his mother was a typist. After graduating from Cornell University in 1997 as an English major, he relocated to San Francisco, where he became an assistant editor at PC/Computing. The magazine's journalists often contributed to the ZDTV programs The Screen Savers and Call for Help. In 1998, Sargent joined Call For Help as the show's "Resident Craft Professional" and substitute co-host. In 2001, he moved to The Screen Savers and became known first as "The Twisted Lister" for producing and presenting odd, "twisted" top-five lists on the show, and later for another segment, "Site of the Night", in which he presented strange websites. Sargent left The Screen Savers in April 2003, to host Unscrewed with Martin Sargent, anchoring a newly introduced late-night programming block.

On March 25, 2004, Comcast's G4 gaming channel announced a merger with TechTV. Around May 6, G4 announced the termination of 250 employees from the San Francisco office by July 10, 2004, allowing approximately 80 to 100 employees to transition to G4's main office in Los Angeles, California if they agreed to relocate there. Sargent chose to stay with G4 and moved to Los Angeles. Six months later, on November 11, 2004, G4TechTV canceled Unscrewed and terminated Sargent, along with many other former co-workers from TechTV.

One year after his termination, Sargent launched Infected by Martin Sargent, a comedy podcast distributed by the internet production company Revision3. Infected was hosted by Sargent and "The Gator" (portrayed by co-writer Jay Speiden, who died in December 2016), produced by Joey Rabier, and was structured as a conversation between co-hosts and producer, with fake "commercials" for various real and fictional products as well as occasional guest callers. Recurring callers included inventor Alex Chiu as well as the fictional characters Johnny O'Banion (portrayed by co-writer/producer Stewart Engesser), a Hollywood reporter and former Loni Anderson paramour, and karate master Rickey Kang (also played by Spieden). O'Banion and Kang were recurring characters on Infected, and Rabier acted as a production assistant on the show and also appeared as his "intern" character for selected skits. The podcast was originally available in audio-only format, then offered an alternative video version consisting of a montage of still photographs relating to the topic discussed and taken at the recording session. The video version has since been offered in full-motion video. Infected was canceled in December 2007, after 50 episodes.

Sargent hosted Web Drifter and Internet Superstar on Revision3 and Why Today Sucked, on GoTV Network's "Laugh Riot" channel, available for video-enabled cell phones on the Sprint network. Web Drifter began as a pilot originally pitched to Comedy Central, but it was picked up by Revision3 after the cable network passed on the show.

On January 30, 2008, the Revision3 website released the first episode of Martin Sargent's new show, Internet Superstar.

As of October 27, 2008, he was made redundant as part of Revision3 layoffs. He has reappeared on Revision3 show 'The Digg Reel' twice since he was laid off, once as acting co-host alongside Kevin Rose while regular host Andrew Bancroft was on vacation. In this appearance he expressed mock-anger that, as part of promotions within the show, other cancelled show 'Pixel Perfect' has been revived, unlike his own shows. He appeared once more on The Digg Reel's 100th episode, in which he jokingly stated that he secretly lived within the walls of the Revision3 building, resulting from his supposed inability to get another job.

Starting February 12, 2009, he and Sarah Lane appeared together in a Podcast on Leo Laporte's TWiT.tv network called This Week in Fun. The show aired for just shy of a year before going on hiatus in January 2010, following Martin's employment at Goodby, Silverstein & Partners in San Francisco. The show was left on good terms with the TWiT network, though they have made no solid plans of returning to production.

In November 2009, Martin and long-time associate Molly McDonald became engaged.

== Credits ==
=== Television ===
- Call for Help – Contributor (1998–2001)
- The Screen Savers – Contributor (1999–2003)
- Unscrewed with Martin Sargent – Host (2003–2004)
- VH1 40 Greatest Internet Superstars – Contributor (2007)

=== Podcasts and vidcasts ===
- Infected – Host (2005–2007)
- DL.TV – Segment Host, CES Special (2006)
- Web Drifter – Host (2007–2008)
- Internet Superstar – Host (2008)
- This WEEK in FUN – Host (2009–2010)
- The New Screen Savers – Guest Host (2015, 2016)
- The New Screen Savers – Appearance (2018)

=== Other ===
- Wilson Harold – Editor (1992–1993)
- College Pro – Crew Chief (1996)
- PC Computing Magazine – Editor (1998)
- TechTV's Digital Video for the Desktop – Author (2002)
- .net Magazine – Columnist (2007)
