= Gamemaker (disambiguation) =

Gamemaker or Game Maker may refer to:

- Video game developer
- GameMaker, a game creation system originally created in 1999 by Mark Overmars, developed by YoYo Games
- Game Makers, a 2002-2005 TV show on G4 television
- Game-Maker, a 1991 DOS-based suite of game design tools by Recreational Software Designs
- Garry Kitchen's GameMaker, a 1985 development environment for the Commodore 64, Apple II, and IBM PCs
- The 3D Gamemaker, a 2001 game creation system by The Game Creators

== See also ==
- Game creation system
- Video game programming
