= Robert Goldstein =

Robert Goldstein may refer to:

- Robert Goldstein (producer) (died 1974), American film producer
- Robert Goldstein, producer and writer of the 1917 film The Spirit of '76
- Robert J. Goldstein, American conspirator

== See also ==
- Bobb Goldsteinn (born 1936), American showman, songwriter and musician
