= Helen O'Rahilly =

Irish television producer and executive

- Born: Dublin
- Occupations: Television producer and executive
- Known for: Work for RTÉ, the BBC and in commercial broadcasting
- Notable work: Watchdog, Rock Shrines, Clive Anderson’s Conspiracies

Helen O'Rahilly is an Irish television producer and executive who has worked for RTÉ, the BBC and in commercial broadcasting. She has also worked on a range of factual programming, both as an independent producer, and at the BBC, and was RTÉ's first female Director of Television Production. She later became Director of Digital Television for the BBC, the Corporation's first Channels Executive for BBCi and a deputy Controller of BBC One.

She is a descendant of The O'Rahilly.

== Career ==
O'Rahilly's career started in RTÉ as a researcher in 1986, she then took several roles in the BBC, ITV and Channel 4 before being appointed Editor of BBC One's Watchdog and its accompanying programme Weekend Watchdog in November 1997 and held the position until May 1999. She took over at Watchdog as ten of the UK's largest companies established a pressure group to discuss how to deal with complaints about the series. From Summer 1999 to February 2000 she was Director of Television Production at RTÉ, becoming the first woman to hold that position, but she soon moved back to the BBC to take up the role of Creative Director for Digital Channels in the BBC’s General Factual department. There she was responsible for bringing several series to television, including Rock Shrines and Clive Anderson’s Conspiracies. In November 2001 she was appointed as the first Channels Executive for BBCi, a job which required her to liaise with the directors of the various BBC channels in order to facilitate links between Television commissioning and the BBC’s Interactive Television team.

She later became deputy controller on BBC One. In 2010 she returned to Dublin to address the first "Women on Air" conference at the city's National Library, offering an insight into the television industry from a female perspective.

== Criticisms of RTÉ ==
In May 2011, she launched a scathing attack on RTÉ's flagship programme, The Late Late Show amid criticism that standards on the programme had slipped since Ryan Tubridy took over as presenter in 2009. In an online blog, O'Rahilly wrote, "If I was back in charge of RTÉ, you wouldn’t see this utter shite on Friday night".

In January 2015, following Health Minister Leo Varadkar's public coming out on RTÉ Radio, O'Rahilly referred to her own, very different, experiences at RTÉ, commenting on Twitter: "The list of RTE homophobes would give you chills … all happy to be such in 2000 not now in 2015. Maybe it's time to go public with the 'great and the good' who caused heartache and misery to so many gay people? … I am sick to death of RTE now being the benign channel of acceptance of homosexuality when it was a bastion of creaking, ancient codes. It was fine to be a woman Director at RTE….just not a GAY one! Once they found out I was a big Gayer, RTE wasn't that happy about having me on screen or on public forums …."
