= Matt Peckham =

American journalist

- Born: Matt C. Peckham; Madison, Wisconsin
- Education: Creighton University
- Occupation: Journalist
- Writing career
- Genre: Non-fiction
- Subjects: Gaming, science, music, technology
- Website: www.time.com

Matt C. Peckham is an American journalist who writes about interactive entertainment, science and the cultural impact of technology. He was TIME Magazine's games critic, before joining Nintendo of America in late 2017.

== Biography ==
Peckham received his M.A. in English from Creighton University in 2001, and began writing about gaming in 2000 for Computer Games Magazine. From 1996 to 2004 he worked as a computer engineer for Union Pacific Railroad, where he specialized in mobile technology research, before leaving to freelance full-time for publications like Computer Gaming World and Variety. In 2007, he founded PC World's games blog, Game On, where he served as games editor through 2011. Since 2011, he wrote about gaming as well as music- and science-related tech for TIME and WIRED. In late 2017 he left TIME to work for Nintendo of America in Redmond.

== Writing career ==
Peckham's work has appeared in both print and online publications, including TIME magazine, WIRED, Variety, The Washington Post, ABC News, Yahoo Tech, Computer Gaming World, Electronic Gaming Monthly, The Sci-Fi Channel and others. Peckham also edits and maintains the official site of Eisner-nominated British writer Mike Carey and American artist/writer Peter Gross, which includes his annotations to Carey and Gross' Vertigo (DC Comics) comic The Unwritten.

In 2009, Peckham's PC World games blog Game On was nominated for a Maggie Award in the category "Best Regularly Featured Web or Digital Edition Column/Consumer."

== Articles ==
- "Mirror's Edge Review: A wild streak of brave new gaming" (PCWorld.com, 2008)
- "Fallout 3 Review: Incredible roleplaying game, lousy ending" (TechHive.com, 2008)
- "Fable II is Peter Molyneux's Smartest Game Yet" (TechHive.com, 2008)
- "Review: Saints Row 2" (Variety.com, 2008)
- "Final Fantasy XIII Review: A plodding prelude to an open-ended opus" (GameSpy.com, 2010)
- "Guild Wars 2: It's the Pinball Machine of MMOs" (TIME.com, 2012)
- "Review: Kingdom Hearts HD 1.5 Remix Is All Kinds of Gorgeous" (TIME.com, 2013)
- "Grand Theft Auto V Review: Everything Rockstar's Learned About Open-World Design, Refined" (TIME.com, 2013)
- "Mario Kart 8 Review: Just What the Wii U Ordered" (TIME.com, 2014)
- "Wolfenstein: The New Order Review: Deconstructing Blazkowicz" (TIME.com, 2014)
- "'Pokémon Go' Is an Ingenious Idea With Too Many Rough Edges" (TIME.com, 2016)
