= Froskurinn =

American esports and gaming host

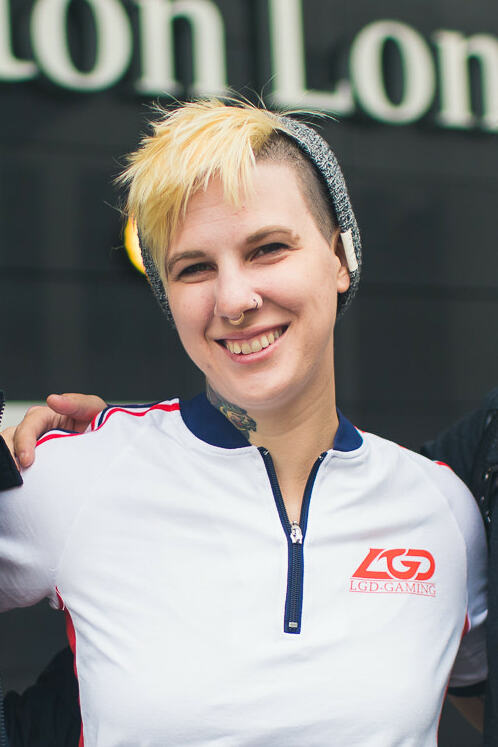
- Black in 2015

Personal information
- Name: Indiana Juniper Black
- Born: Devin Ryanne Mohr; 1991 or 1992 (age 34–35)

Career information
- Game: League of Legends
- Coaching career: 2014–2015
- Casting career: 2015–2023

Indiana Juniper Black (formerly Devin Ryanne Mohr), known online as Froskurinn, is an American color commentator best known for hosting the English broadcast of the League of Legends Pro League, League of Legends European Championship, and Xplay.

== Career ==
Before she began coaching, Black was a semi-professional League of Legends player. In 2014, she joined Robert Morris University Illinois as League of Legends coach. After one year with the team, she left for a coaching role with a professional Chinese team Roar. She was also a coach for Team Dignitas EU until 2015.

Black began her casting career in 2015 after joining the English broadcast team of the League of Legends Pro League (LPL) and became the first English-speaking woman to commentate a live, professional League of Legends match. In 2019, Black left the LPL to join the League of Legends European Championship (LEC) broadcast team. She left the LEC in 2021.

Black co-hosted Xplay on the relaunched G4 network. In a January 2022 episode, Black criticized sexism in the gaming industry, stating that the viewers of the program objectified the previous G4 hosts Morgan Webb and Olivia Munn. In late 2022, 20–30 staff members were laid off by the network, and the remainder of Black's contract was bought out by its parent company, Comcast, terminating her employment.

In January 2023, Black announced she would retire from the esports industry.

== Personal life ==
Black grew up in Portland, Oregon. She married Josie Bellerby in 2020.
