= Filter (TV series) =

American television series

- Country of origin: United States
- No. of episodes: 129

Production
- Running time: 21-22 minutes

Original release
- Network: G4/G4techTV
- Release: May 1, 2002 – August 26, 2006

Filter's logo, after the 2006 revamp

Filter's logo, after the 2005 revamp

Filter's original logo

Filter is an American television series on the G4 cable television channel which follows a countdown format. It was canceled in December 2005, resurrected in a re-formatted form, and then once again was canceled in August 2006. It was airing as an interstitial program during commercial breaks prior to May 2012. The show allows registers users (or viewers) to vote in Top Ten lists.

== History ==
Filter was one of the 13 original series to debut with G4. The focus of the show was video games, and each episode covered a different genre, such as sports or role-playing video games. Each week a new theme was chosen and viewers chose the top ten to be featured on the show. The top two games would be put in a Filter Face-off, where the winner was revealed. Shows included the top ten Final Fantasy games, worst games of all time, and all-time top-ten platformers.

After the purchase of TechTV, Filter was revamped to include more pop culture lists such as theatrical and DVD movie releases, music concerts, and consumer technology. The segment "Tech Toss-up" was added to cover new gadgets such as cellphones and MP3 players. A segment called "Net to Know" showcased correspondent John Walsh's top three websites of the week.

On December 9, 2005, host Diane Mizota announced the show had been canceled as a part of the retooling of G4 to cover a broader male audience. Running for four years and making 116 episodes, it was one of the few shows to have been on the network since its launch. The Howard Stern Show then announced on April 18, 2006, that Filter would return on Saturday June 3, 2006, with Stern's girlfriend Beth Ostrosky as host. In addition, the top-ten format would be altered so that lists may contain different numbers of items.

With the 2006 relaunch, all segments not pertaining to the countdown were removed, and the focus of the countdowns changed to include pop-culture events, cars and auto tech, male culture, and other topics pertaining to the interest of the network's new demographic. This reincarnation of the show was shortly canceled. However, it continued to air as one of G4's "G-Spot" interstitial programs hosted by Olivia Munn and later Candace Bailey until May 2012.

== Hosts ==
=== 2006 ===
- Beth Ostrosky: The wife of radio shock jock Howard Stern, she also co-hosted Casino Cinema on Spike TV, wrote for the magazine FHM, and has appeared on Stern's show numerous times.

=== Former ===
- Diane Mizota: After leaving G4, she joined Revision3 and with former Filter co-hosts Han Choi and Andrew Hawnbegan appeared on InDigital, a technology show that focuses on gadgets and gear. She has since left the show.
