= Becky Worley =

American journalist (born 1971)

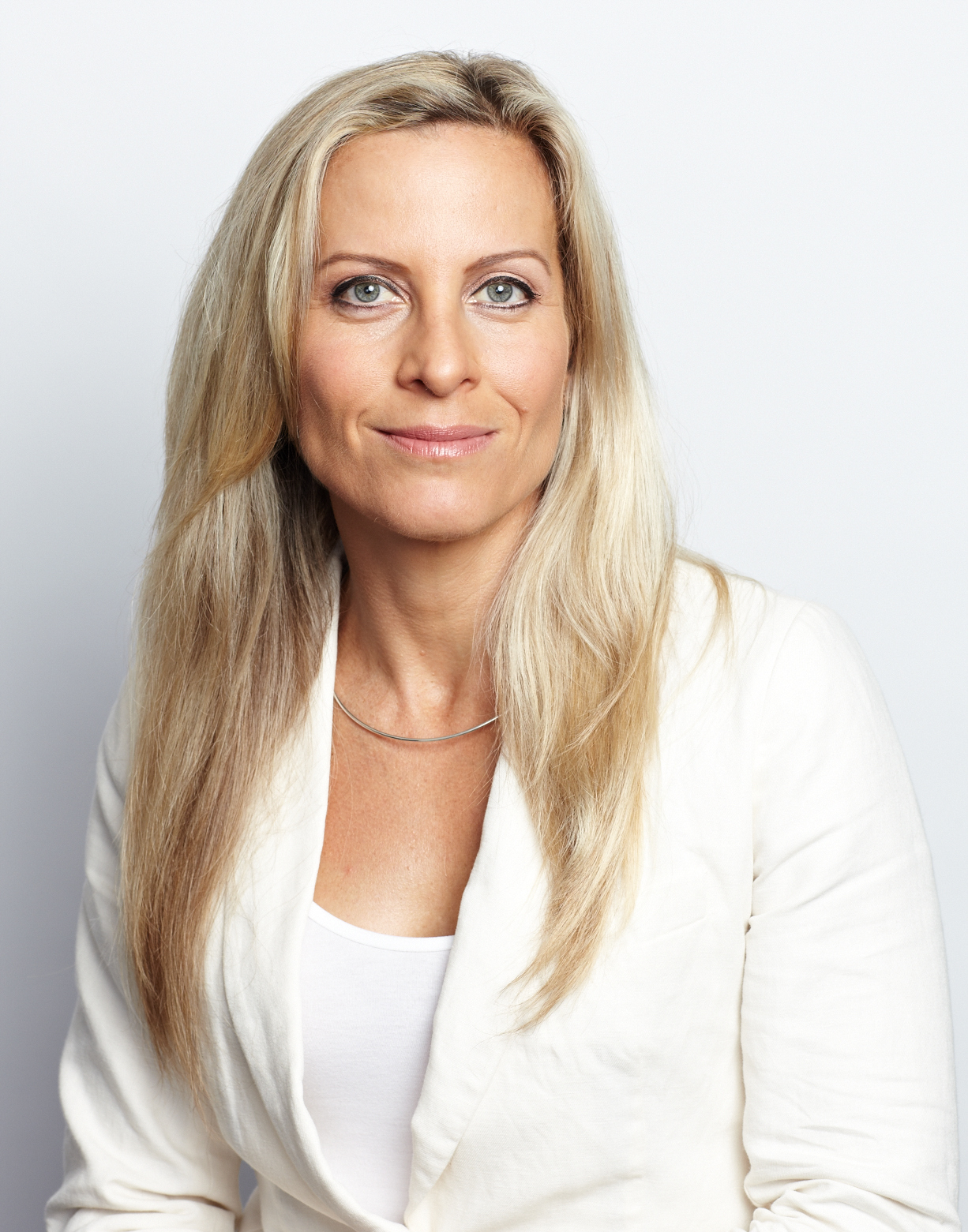
- Worley in 2012
- Born: February 4, 1971 (age 55)
- Partner: Jane Mitchell
- Children: 2
- Presenting career
- Show: Good Morning America
- Network: ABC
- Country: United States
- Website: www.beckyworley.com

Becky Worley (born February 4, 1971) is an American journalist and broadcaster. She is the tech and consumer correspondent for Good Morning America on ABC, was a tech podcaster for the TWiT network, and a host and blogger for shows on TechTV and Yahoo! Tech.

== Education ==
Worley graduated cum laude from Middlebury College in Vermont studying Japanese and started playing Rugby for the Berkley All-Blues. She earned a Bachelor of Arts in 1993. She later received a Master of Arts in Education from the Learning, Design, and Technology program at the Stanford Graduate School of Education in 2005.

== Career ==
Worley worked for KOMO-TV news in Seattle from 1993 through 1996. She left to consult on web design and information technology for small business.

She then spent 6 years (1998–2005) with ZDTV / TechTV. though she started as a Line producer for Call For Help Worley is probably best known for being TechLive's Computer Security Analyst. She reported, anchored the news, and hosted a how-to show for TechTV. Worley wrote TechTV's Security Alert: Stories of Real People Protecting Themselves from Identity Theft, Viruses, and Scams (TechTV, November, 2003) (ISBN 0-7357-1352-9).

In 2004, Worley hosted a series on the National Geographic Channel called Mother of All, a show in which fine arts and industrial arts were blended together using whatever material was available to make the "Mother of All" things. Worley began on ABC's Good Morning America in 2005, and has appeared on their Weekend Edition starting in 2011. She has appeared as a Technology Contributor for ABC World News Tonight since 2011. She has been with Yahoo! Tech since 2006 as a video blogger and host of the weekly web broadcast Hook Me Up. From 2006 through 2007, she hosted a show for the Travel Channel called The Best Places to Find Cash and Treasures. She spent part of 2010 as a co-host to Tom Merritt on a daily podcast in the TWiT.tv network called Tech News Today.

== Personal life ==
Worley was raised on the island of Maui from 1977 and lives in Oakland, California with her wife and two children. Worley is a bisexual.
