= Robert J. Goldstein =

American conspirator

Dr. Robert J. Goldstein is an American conspirator who plotted with two accomplices to destroy the Islamic Education Center in Pinellas County, Florida with homemade C4. A police search of the Goldstein home in August 2002 found a list of 50 Islamic worship centers on Florida, home-made explosives and a mission statement to "Kill all rags". Goldstein admitted that he planned to destroy the center and pleaded guilty to conspiracy to violate civil rights, conspiracy to damage religious property, and possession of unlicensed destructive devices. He was sentenced to 12 years and 7 months in federal prison.

Ahmed Bedier, a spokesman for the Council for American-Islamic Relations who worshipped at the Pinellas County mosque, alleged double standards in the treatment of Goldstein and argued that Goldstein should have been prosecuted as a terrorist, but prosecutors said the facts of the case didn't warrant such a charge. "I'm happy he's behind bars and will serve some time, but it's nowhere enough for the damage he intended to do," Bedier said.

Shortly after his release from prison in 2014, Goldstein was sentenced to an additional year after police found a loaded gun in his apartment. In 2019, he was sentenced to nine years in prison for possession of an AK-47-style rifle, a shotgun and 14 semi-automatic handguns.
