= Hurl! =

2008 American television game show

- Starring: Tom Crehan, Dale Roy Robinson
- Country of origin: United States
- No. of episodes: 11

Production
- Executive producers: Tom Crehan, Dale Roy Robinson
- Running time: 30 minutes per episode (inc. advertisements)

Original release
- Network: G4
- Release: July 16 – September 19, 2008

Hurl! is an American television game show from G4 that first premiered on G4 in the United States on July 16, 2008. It takes a unique twist on competitive eating. The concept is for competitors to alternate between challenges of competitive eating and extreme activities in order to see who will be last to vomit. The winner receives $1,000 cash on the spot.

== Format ==
The show begins with an unidentified person shopping for food and purchasing the food for the current episode, with a narration about competition. The intro ends with the clerk asking "What are you going to do with all this stuff?"

Prior to the game beginning, some information is provided via the narrators and on-screen text. All on-screen information for the viewer is done by holding up a post-it note or a notebook with handwriting on them. The "one simple rule" of the game is incorrectly described by the narrator as "whoever eats the most and hurls the least, wins". In fact the winner is the contestant that hurls the last or not at all. Five competitors are introduced by name, height, weight, and occupation. The five begin the game by eating large quantities of food, usually a single savory dish accompanied with a drink to help wash it down. All food and drinks are identified as being organic. The food is placed on deli scales, which are used to determine through subtraction how much each competitor eats. Of the five competitors, only the three that eat the most in a span of five minutes make it through to the second round.

The second round involves some sort of physical or recreational activity, usually one that involves large amounts of spinning, for five minutes. The activity can end early if one of the contestants vomits. A "hurl" is defined on the show as any swallowed food that comes out of the mouth. If a player vomits into their mouth and it does not come out, it is not a "hurl".

For the third round, competitors return to the scales and eat for another four minutes. Sometimes they eat the same food as the first round, while other times they move to a second food item, usually a dessert. If three competitors make it to the third round, then the two that eat the most in the third round move on, unless somebody vomits first.

After the third round, if two competitors are left, a fourth round of extreme activities is done in a "sudden barf" format: first to "hurl", loses. Sometimes the extreme activity is done blindfolded to induce disequilibrium and nausea. If necessary, a fifth round of eating and a sixth round of blindfolded extreme activities are done as well. If both players make it through all six rounds without hurling, then the one that ate the most during just the fifth round wins the contest.

The game crew that runs the competition is called the "hazmat team". They are several people dressed in Level C hazmat suits, complete with gas masks, and act as a cleanup crew. Although they are dealing with bodily fluids, necessitating some precaution, their dress is exaggerated for comedic effect.

When a player vomits on-screen, the vomit is censored with numbered buckets and a pinball game sound effect. The buckets are used to arbitrarily rate the scale of the vomiting, up to an "epic five-bucket blowout" on YouTube, although in Episode 11, a contestant hurls while being spun by a Sumo wrestler, and the narrator observes that on a scale of 1 to 5 buckets, this was an 11 bucket hurl. They are usually (but not always) preceded by a "hurl warning" with a handwritten note in front of the camera and a Klaxon, which also is sometimes used with close calls and fakeouts. The show also shows various "strategies" employed by some players to either eat more food or try to induce other players to vomit. Each strategy or technique has a number that is shown to the viewer on a handwritten note.

The last one remaining wins $1,000, which is paid immediately in cash by "Manny" (Manny Salcido), the leader of the hazmat team. If the winner also ate the most food in the contest, then they also win the "Iron Stomach Award". Sometimes the winner will vomit after their win; since they already won, this does not affect the outcome of the game. The show will also depict competitors that have lost and vomit after being eliminated.

The G4 network aired all 11 episodes in an uncensored (no buckets and no sound effects) format after the censored episodes had been shown.

== Episodes ==
#	Title	Content
1	"Balls of Hurl"	Contestants eat Mac & Cheese, then strap into steel-caged Human Bowling Balls and careen down LA's famous 2nd Street Tunnel.
2	"Flamethrowupper"	It is Zero G hurling as contestants slurp down as much Cream of Spinach soup as they can and then board the Flamethrower: a ride that flings them.
3	"NASA NAuSeA"	Human Gyroscopes spin competitors in three gut-wrenching directions after they have consumed a collective 10 pounds of Chicken Pot Pie.
4	"Octopuke"	Contestants power down as much Broccoli & Cauliflower with Cheese Sauce as they can before gutting it out on the Octopus - a multi-armed amusement ride.
5	"Hurlympics"	Contestants eat as much Won Ton Soup and Dim Sum as they can and then test their iron stomachs on the Megaloop - a 60-foot-high (18 m) vertical loop...
6	"Merry-Go-Retch"	Contestants binge on peanut butter & jelly sandwiches and ambrosia salad then endure a merry-go-round ride.
7	"Dog and Pony Show"	Contestants gobble hot dogs then battle centrifugal force on the wildly rotating Round-Up. Surviving the ride earns a second course of... chili dogs!
8	"That’s Bull"	Contestants binge on franks 'n beans and creamed corn and then ride a mechanical bull.
9	"Hurlpool"	Contestants enjoy a BBQ and then go for a stomach churning swim. Those who make it to round 2 gobble up blueberry pie and then hit the water.
10	"Sumo Arigato"	Contestants competitively chow down on noodle soup and sushi and then endure the captain's chair and sumo bump!
11	"Tempest in a Teacup"	Contestants pig out on clam chowder and then ride nausea inducing spinning tea cups.

== See also ==
- Emetophilia
- Emetophobia
