= Geneshaft =

Japanese anime television series

- Cover for the first DVD of Geneshaft

ジーンシャフト (Jīn Shafuto)
- Genre: Adventure, Mecha, Biopunk
- Anime television series
- Directed by: Kazuki Akane
- Music by: Akira Takasaki
- Studio: Satelight, Studio Gazelle
- Licensed by: AUS: Madman Entertainment; NA: Bandai Entertainment
- Original network: WOWOW
- English network: NA: TechTV/G4techTV; SEA: Animax Asia
- Original run: April 5, 2001 – June 28, 2001
- Episodes: 13
- Manga

Lunashaft
- Written by: Kyoushi Namaguchi
- Volumes: 2

Geneshaft (Japanese: ジーンシャフト, Hepburn: Jīn Shafuto) is a Japanese science fiction anime television series set in space, produced by Bandai Visual in 2001, and directed by Kazuki Akane (of Escaflowne fame). It was broadcast on the WOWOW network and was translated and dubbed into English by the anime television network Animax, who broadcast it from within its respective networks in Southeast Asia, the Indian subcontinent and around the world. Tubi TV later added the series.

The story revolves around the voyages of the Bilkis spaceship across the Solar System, and its crew of genetically engineered humans, as they attempt to uncover the mysteries of an alien technology threatening to destroy the Earth, and whose nature may reveal the true origins and destiny of humanity in the late 23rd century.

The series is characterized by its exploration of the theme of genetic engineering, and the possible consequences of this technology dominating and defining future human society. It also contains a distinctive metal soundtrack with electronica elements (composed by Akira Takasaki), often featuring electric guitar solos at dramatic moments.

Featured as a central plot element is the 'Shaft', a Mecha with a peculiar appearance. Made entirely using CGI, this humanoid robot's design appears to resemble gray mechanical cranes, lacking appealing characteristics common to other Mecha, such as bright colors or even a 'head'.

== Plot ==
Geneshaft is set in a future where genetic engineering has become the dominating technology, defining human society entirely. The government of Earth is totalitarian and as a result there has been peace for 200 years. The government is in control of human reproduction, and is in charge of all (artificial) births, as well as altering the genetic characteristics of every new individual, according to their function in society. One alteration common to all individuals limits their lifespan to 45 years, in order to limit the extent of aging so that they remain healthy and able throughout all of their adult lives.

People are largely rated by the quality of their DNA, and those whose DNA is relatively unrefined, such as those of the 'white' gene type, are generally considered inferior. In order to prevent irrational behavior caused by strong emotional attachment, family structures have been disbanded, and the emotions of love and lust eliminated. The ratio of men to women is 1:9, as it is considered that males are more aggressive than females, and this was part of what led past societies to destruction. Modern society is completely peaceful, the few men typically having leading-type positions, and commonly being of gene types that grant enhanced decision-making skills, while the females are in charge of lesser positions. Men are assigned Registers – emotionless, drone-like women – whose purpose is to document all actions a man takes, as men's DNA contains elements of destructive desires that cannot be eliminated, while acting as his assistant.

The story begins at the time when a 500 kilometer in diameter ring-shaped structure had appeared near the Earth five years prior. Dispatched from nearby Markanan space station, several female astronauts were about to investigate its nature when it produces a massive energy blast which destroys the space station and a large portion of the surface of the Earth, after which it disappears. This instigates the mobilization of a special group of men and women with specific genetic characteristics, who set out aboard the Bilkis spaceship to investigate the origins of the ring, and the possible connection with mysterious alien technology found in Jupiter's moon Ganymede.

During their voyages they encounter several instances of the Ring technology, which they fight with the giant mecha, called 'Shaft'. The technology of Shaft is mysterious and the mecha requires very special skills to be piloted. Along the way, they also encounter situations and people which make them question their nature as 'superior', and raise doubts about how 'perfect' their society really is.

== Characters ==
Mika Seido
Voiced by: Kumiko Higa (Japanese); Amanda Winn-Lee (English)
Mika is the main protagonist of the story. She is short but has considerable strength, though it is explained that she has the genetype white, leading to her being mocked by other characters as being inferior. Mika is much more passionate and aggressive than many of the people around her, but is also extremely loyal. Mika was very close to her "mother", the woman who genetically engineered her, and her sentient dog. Her childhood best friend Ryoko was killed in the previous year, and she blames Amagiwa for her death, believing that he murdered her to save his own life (although since in this society humans are considered to be nothing more than the sum of their genes, Ryoko's death would never be considered murder since she had an identical twin). She repeatedly threatens him because of this, but finds it bewildering that he is so confident in her potential and abilities, especially since she is a "white." Mika eventually teams up with Amagiwa and helps defeat Mir and Sneak. She also finds that she has fallen in love with her former enemy.
Sofia Galgalim
Voiced by: Yūko Kaida (Japanese); Mary Elizabeth McGlynn (English)
Sofia is a colleague and friend of Mika and was previously working as an underwater salvager. She has the alias of Lunar Teddybear, although Tiki claims she is more of a "Grizzly Bear." She is genetype purple, and so she has exotic looks and a calm personality. She also takes great pride in her physical capabilities, insisting that she is undefeated in fifty kinds of martial arts. Sofia's faith in her society begins to waver when she encounters a gang of 21st century astronauts who are still attached to the idea of love, lust and family. Sofia eventually sacrifices herself to save the Shaft (with Mika in it) and the Bilkis, but confesses to Mika before she dies that she wishes she could have been a mother.
Hiroto Amagiwa
Voiced by: Takahiro Sakurai (Japanese); Dominic Armato (English)
Hiroto is an enemy of Mika because of events that took place prior to the beginning of the story, involving her dead friend Ryoko. Though Mika claims that he is a coward who only wants to save himself, Hiroto proves to be a capable commander who can make the tough decisions as well as more merciful ones. He has been groomed by his parents since birth to be a commander. He is also haunted by the loss of Ryoko because she committed suicide to save him, although he does not show it outwardly. The crew considers him almost robotic in his chilly command style, but he seems to be struck by the more loving, friendly demeanor of Mario. Despite Mika's initial hatred for him, Amagiwa teams up with her to defeat Sneak, and falls in love with her as well; he is later revealed to have known Mika and Ryoko since their childhood. Hiroto's sidearm of choice is the FN Herstal (Five-Seven), a Belgian pistol that can carry 5.7X28mm SS190, an armor-piercing ammunition used for P90 submachine guns.
Tiki Musicanova
Voiced by: Houko Kuwashima (Japanese); Sandy Fox (English)
Tiki who appears to be an energetic young girl is known as the Hell's Faerie from the Kerberos base on Mars where on the thirteenth operation she decimated an entire platoon by herself. She is also known as Tinkerbell and is the younger sister of Mario. Unlike her charming and mature brother, Tiki is hyperactive, childlike and rather obnoxious, often insulting Mika for the fun of it. She is a capable Shaft driver but loses focus too easily if nothing interesting is happening around her. However, she becomes more focused toward the end of the series, when her brother dies saving the Bilkis.
Mario Musicanova
Voiced by: Kenji Hamada (Japanese); Crispin Freeman (English)
Tiki's older brother, and the backup captain in case anything should happen to Amagiwa. In many ways he is Amagiwa's opposite: he is extremely warm, caring and outgoing, and has a deep bond with his sister despite society's rejection of family. He also becomes very close to Amagiwa's Register, the seemingly aloof Beatrice, and may even fall in love with her. Mario briefly serves as captain of the Bilkis when Amagiwa falls ill. However when the Bilkis is attacked by a former classmate of his, Jean, Mario invades Jean's ship and assassinates him. He suffers from severe nerve damage from the transport, but is still able to detonate a bomb strapped to his body, killing both himself and Jean, and saving the Bilkis.
Lieutenant Mir Lotus
Voiced by: Yumi Kakazu (Japanese); Paula Tiso (English)
Mir, commonly known as the Ice Queen, is a conceited, egotistical woman whose DNA grants her perfect skills, which she frequently mentions to those around her. She is also extremely snobby, insisting that she will never use a tool that is imperfect, such as the Shaft, and belittling Mika whenever she has the chance. The only person she actually seems to respect is Lord Sneak, and she is badly shaken when he admits in the first episode that he used her to weed out terrorists. However, his smooth talk and flattery soon make her devoted to him again because of his perfect genetics. Even when Sneak's treachery is revealed, Mir attempts to help him for a while, fighting the "inferior white" Mika, but is defeated by her and after subsequently talking to both Mika and Tiki realizes that she has others who care about her. She then returns to the Bilkis.
Remmy Levistrauss
Voiced by: Ryoka Yuzuki (Japanese); Brianne Siddall (English)
Remmy, sometimes called the Desert Medusa, is an analytical girl who is supportive of, and seeks acknowledgment from other people—in particular, Mir. She constantly fawns on Mir because of her perfect genetype, but begins to develop a fondness for Mika because she's "interesting." It turns out that Remmy is more complex than anyone thought: she is part of a rebel terrorist faction hoping to restore humanity's natural order, and she is actually in league with Lord Sneak. When she learns his true plans, she attempts to save the Bilkis and he murders her.
Dolce Saito
Voiced by: Ayako Kawasumi (Japanese); Lani Minella (English)
A brilliant, ten-year-old computer genius known as the "Puppet Master", who is on the Bilkis to debug the Shaft. Dolce is quiet and hardly ever speaks, but carries around a screeching puppet android that constantly howls orders at other programmers, and cackles insanely all the time. She devoutly believes that her computer skills are perfect and unparalleled.
Lord Sergei the 4th Sneak
Voiced by: Shinji Kawada (Japanese); Jamieson Price (English)
A high-ranking commander who has perfect DNA, and is responsible for the Bilkis' journey. Lord Sneak turns out to be highly manipulative and cunning. During an evacuation, he fatally shoots his annoying Register, and admits to Mir that he used her to sniff out terrorists; he is later revealed to be the show's main villain. Despite this, Mir remains devoted to him because of his genetic purity, and even teams up with him at the end. It is revealed that he is actually malignant and destructive on a far wider scale, and believes that he must cleanse the universe of human beings. For this end, he has been in league with Oberus all along. He is killed by lava on Europa.

== Anime ==
On March 21, 2001, it was announced that Geneshaft would premiere on April 5, 2001, on the WOWOW network. On October 2, 2003, TechTV acquired the broadcast rights to broadcast the series. The opening is "Shaft Drive" by Akira Takasaki/Ji-Zo while the ending theme is "Broken Camera" by Ji-Zo. For episode 13, the ending theme is "The Day Believe All Things" by Akira Takasaki. All episode titles are references to science-fiction books.

| No. | Title | Original release date |
|---|---|---|
| 1 | "Successors to the Stars"; Transliteration: "hoshi o tsugu mono" (Japanese: 惑星(ほし)を継ぐもの) | April 5, 2001 |
Note: Episode title named after Inherit the Stars by James P. Hogan.
| 2 | "The Ship Who Sang"; Transliteration: "utau fune" (Japanese: 歌う戦艦(ふね)) | April 12, 2001 |
Note: Episode title named after The Ship Who Sang by Anne McCaffrey.
| 3 | "Rendezvous in Space"; Transliteration: "sora no randebū" (Japanese: 宇宙(そら)のランデブー) | April 19, 2001 |
Note: Episode title named after Rendezvous with Rama by Arthur C. Clarke.
| 4 | "The Sentinel"; Transliteration: "zenshō" (Japanese: 前哨) | April 26, 2001 |
Note: Episode title named after Expedition to Earth by Arthur C. Clarke.
| 5 | "Angels and Spaceships"; Transliteration: "tenshi to uchūsen" (Japanese: 天使と宇宙船) | May 3, 2001 |
Note: Episode title named after Angels and Spaceships by Fredric William Brown.
| 6 | "Hotline from the Past"; Transliteration: "kako kara no hottorain" (Japanese: 過去からのホットライン) | May 10, 2001 |
Note: Episode title named after Thrice Upon a Time by James P. Hogan.
| 7 | "Ring World"; Transliteration: "ringu wārudo" (Japanese: リング・ワールド) | May 17, 2001 |
Note: Episode title named after Ringworld by Larry Niven.
| 8 | "The Moon is a Harsh Lord of the Darkness"; Transliteration: "tsuki wa mujihina yami no teiō" (Japanese: 月は無慈悲な闇の帝王) | May 24, 2001 |
Note: Episode title named after The Moon is a Harsh Mistress by Robert Heinlein.
| 9 | "Less Than Human"; Transliteration: "ningen ika" (Japanese: 人間以下) | May 31, 2001 |
Note: Episode title named after More Than Human by Theodore Sturgeon.
| 10 | "The Men Women Don't See"; Transliteration: "onna-tachi no shiranai otoko" (Japanese: 女たちの知らない男) | June 7, 2001 |
Note: Episode title named after The Women Men Don't See by James Tiptree, Jr.
| 11 | "Rite of Passage"; Transliteration: "seichō e no gishiki" (Japanese: 成長への儀式) | June 14, 2001 |
Note: Episode title named after Footfall by Larry Niven.
| 12 | "A Gentle Man in Ganymede"; Transliteration: "ganimede no yasashii otoko" (Japanese: ガニメデの優しい男) | June 21, 2001 |
Note: Episode title named after The Gentle Giants of Ganymede by James P. Hogan.
| 13 | "Childhood's Beginning"; Transliteration: "yōnenki no hajimari" (Japanese: 幼年期の始まり) | June 28, 2001 |
Note: Episode title named after Childhood's End by Arthur C. Clarke.
