= Body Hits =

- Starring: John Marsden
- Country of origin: United Kingdom
- Original language: English
- No. of episodes: 19

Production
- Producer: V.J. Anderson
- Running time: 30 minutes

Original release
- Network: BBC Three
- Release: January 27 – April 20, 2004

Body Hits is a TV series which focused on what goes on inside people's bodies as they fight their way through their hectic modern lifestyle. Dr. John Marsden was the show's host for its entirety. The programme aired on BBC Three in the United Kingdom; TechTV (later G4techTV) in the United States; The LifeStyle Channel, ABC1 (as part of Catalyst) and ABC2 in Australia; and Prime Television in New Zealand.

Series 1 (seven episodes) and 2 (six episodes) first aired on BBC Three in 2003, with series 3 (six episodes) following in 2005.

== Episodes ==
1.	20 Apr 04	Waste Cases
2.	27 Jan 04	Body Beautiful
3.	3 Feb 04	Detox Devils
4.	10 Feb 04	Weekend Junkies
5.	17 Feb 04	Natural Highs
6.	24 Feb 04	Sensory Overload
7.	2 Mar 04	Summer Shocks
8.	9 Mar 04	Love Story
9.	16 Mar 04	Baby Quest
10.	23 Mar 04	Against the Clock
11.	30 Mar 04	Cold Snap
12.		Snack Attack
13.		Smart Drugs
