= Xplay =

American television program

- Also known as: GameSpot TV (1998–2001); Extended Play (2001–2003); X-Play (2003–2013)
- Written by: Mike Demski (2008–12)
- Directed by: Annaliza Savage (1998–2003)
- Starring: Adam Sessler (1998–2012, 2021–22); John Villarreal (1998); Lauren Fielder (1998–99); Kate Botello (2000–02); Morgan Webb (2003–13); Blair Herter (2012–13); Froskurinn (2021–22); The Completionist (2021–22); The Black Hokage (2021–22)
- Country of origin: United States
- Original language: English
- No. of episodes: 1,378+

Production
- Executive producer: Wade Beckett (2008–12)
- Producers: Annaliza Savage (1998–2003); Matt Keil (2008–12)
- Editors: Dave Gleason (2008–12); Justin Dornbush (2008–12); Brian Sullivan (2011–12); KORB! (2011–12); Sam Goldfien (2011–12)
- Camera setup: Multiple-camera setup
- Running time: 22–25 minutes
- Production company: G4 Media, LLC

Original release
- Network: ZDTV (1998–2000); TechTV (2000–04); G4techTV (2004–2005); G4 (2005–13, 2021–22)
- Release: July 4, 1998 – January 23, 2013
- Release: November 19, 2021 – October 16, 2022

Xplay is an American television program dedicated to video games, blending in-depth reviews and industry news, which primarily aired from 1998 to 2013 across two networks. Originally launched as GameSpot TV on ZDTV (later rebranded as TechTV), the program premiered on July 4, 1998, and featured hosts Adam Sessler, Lauren Fielder, and John Villarreal, focusing on gameplay previews and critiques. In 2001, following the end of its partnership with Ziff Davis' GameSpot and TechTV's rebranding, the program adopted the name Extended Play before settling on X-Play in 2003. Sessler continued as the lead host, joined by co-hosts Kate Botello (2000–2002) and Morgan Webb (2003–2013).

The series moved to G4 in 2004 after Comcast's acquisition and merger of TechTV with the gaming-focused network, where it ran until its conclusion in 2013 amid G4's rebranding efforts. The program's original incarnation ran for 1,378 episodes, and was praised by critics for its accessibility, entertaining presentation, host chemistry and personalities, and ability to provide engaging yet digestible coverage of the video game industry. It briefly revived in 2021 on a rebooted G4 network, with returning host Sessler and co-hosts Froskurinn, The Completionist, and The Black Hokage, but the network shut down less than a year later in October 2022 due to low viewership.

== History ==
=== Original series ===
The opening logos for GameSpot TV (1998-2001), Extended Play (2001-2003), and X-Play (2003-2013)

GameSpot TV premiered on July 4, 1998, as one of the initial programs on the newly launched ZDTV cable network, which was established by Ziff Davis on May 11, 1998, to focus on technology and computing content. The program originated from a partnership between ZDTV and Ziff Davis's GameSpot website, emphasizing reviews and previews of video games. Production took place in San Francisco on a gritty set featuring a chained link fence silhouette and flaming TV screens, and was initially co-hosted by Adam Sessler, Lauren Fielder, and John Villarreal. Early viewership was low, with Sessler estimating around 10,000 per episode. The show secured notable interviews, including one with Gabe Newell about Half-Life. The Columbine High School massacre on April 20, 1999, lead to death threats against Sessler and a restriction on depicting gun violence on the show, which limited coverage of certain titles such as Grand Theft Auto III. Fielder departed in September 1999, with Kate Botello replacing her on April 29, 2000.

ZDTV was acquired by Vulcan Ventures in November 1999, and the network rebranded to TechTV in August 2000. On February 17, 2001, GameSpot TV was retitled Extended Play to distance it from the GameSpot branding, and it became part of TechTV's live broadcasting endeavor, which resulted in a high turnover rate. Extended Play survived post-9/11 economic cuts and layoffs that affected other programming. Botello exited on March 29, 2002. On April 28, 2003, Extended Play rebranded to X-Play, premiering in TechTV's new late-night programming block, upon which it became the network's top-rated program. Morgan Webb was introduced as Sessler's co-host at this time. Because X-Play aired at a later time slot than its predecessors, it featured more risque language and subject matter, and the previous gun violence restriction was lifted.

In May 2004, Comcast acquired TechTV from Vulcan, and merged it with its video game network G4 to form G4techTV. The acquisition led to staff layoffs and what Sessler described as a poorly handled transition that strained relations with the new owners. In September 2004, X-Play relocated from San Francisco to Los Angeles; the new set was conceived as a modern apartment that meshed the personalities of Sessler and Webb. G4techTV would revert to G4 in February 2005. The crew's resistance to G4's culture inspired a creative peak, though a costly musical episode flopped. The rise of streaming platforms like YouTube, which allowed trailers and video reviews to circulate more quickly, put X-Play's linear television format at a disadvantage. The program's E3 2006 broadcast was interrupted by ads and FCC-mandated breaks, notably cutting off the Halo 3 reveal, further highlighting the limitations of television. From this point forward, X-Play struggled with declining ratings, exclusive content battles, and the inability to compete with instant online content.

On March 4, 2007, it was announced that the G4 studios in Santa Monica would close on April 15. Production of G4 programs was relocated to the studios of the E! Television Network situated elsewhere in the Los Angeles area. As a consequence, new sets had to be designed for X-Play, and many G4 employees involved in production were laid off. Tensions rose between G4 and E!, who clashed over cultural differences. On January 14, 2008, G4 commenced with a complete overhaul to the show's entire format, branding the move as X-Play "jumping to the next level". In December 2008, the show aired X-Large one-hour episodes for the month. Economic factors forced G4 to contract X-Play's schedule down to three nights a week starting on March 2, 2009; in addition, the show's timeslot was moved out of prime-time, and a number of X-Play staff members were laid off.

Sessler departed in 2012, with his final episode airing on April 25. Blair Herter acted as Webb's co-host for the remainder of the program's run. On October 26, 2012, G4 announced the end of production for X-Play as part of a brand overhaul, with a series of farewell episodes airing through the year's end. The program ran for 1,378 episodes, with the series finale airing on January 23, 2013.

=== Revival ===
In July 2020, G4 teased a revival of the network, set for a 2021 launch. Following a Thanksgiving reunion special featuring original G4 personalities, G4 confirmed on January 28, 2021, that X-Play would be revived. On February 12, Sessler was confirmed to return as the program's host.

The revival premiered on November 19, 2021, airing live-streamed episodes on Twitch and YouTube. During a "Gaming Grievances" segment in a January 2022 episode, co-host Froskurinn criticized the network's viewers, alleging a sexist backlash against her, particularly for not being as "bangable" as former G4 hosts Morgan Webb and Olivia Munn, who she claimed were objectified and harassed as "fake gamer girls." She made further allegations of dehumanizing comments and unconscious biases targeting her for being a woman in gaming, despite reading the same scripts as Sessler. Her remarks were shared on G4's Twitter and supported by Sessler. Following significant layoffs at G4 in September 2022, Froskurinn was let go from the network after Comcast bought out the remainder of her contract. Anonymous sources speculated that her exit was linked to a September 15 tweet where she posted an "I survived" meme, seen by some as insensitive after the layoffs. On October 16, 2022, Comcast Spectacor abruptly shut down G4 entirely, citing low viewership and failure to meet business expectations, ending the Xplay revival less than a year after its launch.

== Format and content ==
Xplay primarily centers on reviews, tips and tricks, and previews for contemporary PC and console video games, as well as competitions, strategies, industry news and gossip. The program employs a 1-5 scoring system for its reviews. The reviews were initially provided by GameSpot and its sister site VideoGames.com. Apart from reviews and previews, X-Play features a segment in which the top titles (best of the year, all-time, or worst) in different genres are explored. Between reviews, the hosts may perform sketches and redubbed game footage. Special episodes showcase short tours of popular gaming companies or in-depth visits to video game trade shows. Special guest interviews with celebrities discuss their gaming habits or games they star in. Occasionally, episodes may feature a theme, such as retro or zombie-based games; a musical episode, in which Sessler and Webb compiled the best video game soundtracks of all time, was the program's most expensive episode.

On January 14, 2008, X-Play shifted from its prior focus primarily on game reviews to a broader, daily news and entertainment-oriented structure. While the core review segment was retained, focus was expanded on breaking news, behind-the-scenes previews of games in development, interviews with industry figures, live hands-on gameplay demonstrations, and in-depth analysis of industry trends. Several new recurring segments and features were introduced, including: integration of tips and tricks content from G4's Cheat! series, presented by host Kristin Adams; regular "The MMO Report" updates on massively multiplayer online games, featuring Casey Schreiner; game challenges offering viewers opportunities to compete and win prizes; and exclusive hands-on gameplay demonstrations of upcoming titles.

== Hosts and staff ==
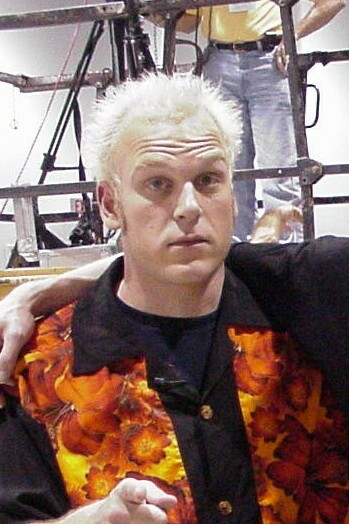
Adam Sessler (2000)

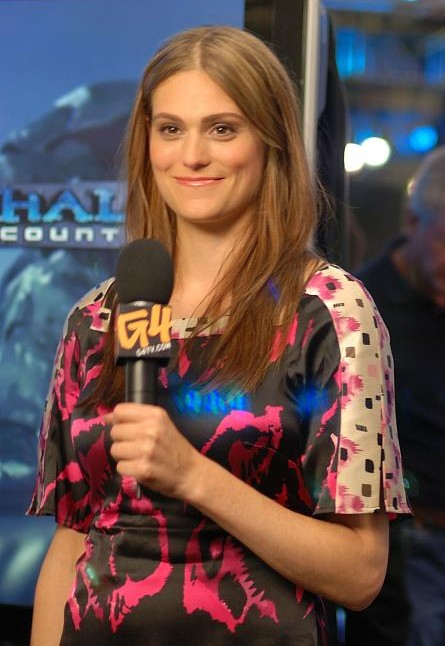
Morgan Webb (2007)

Sessler and Webb co-hosted X-Play for much of the program's original run.

Adam Sessler was the host of the program for the bulk of its original incarnation. Previously, he had worked two-and-a-half years in a bank's credit department while moonlighting as an actor on a public-access San Francisco program, Chip Weigh Magnet Down. Through a friend's connection, he learned about a hosting opportunity for GameSpot's program. Though out of touch with gaming, Sessler prepared for the audition by memorizing the titles Resident Evil 2 and Final Fantasy VII but botched the latter during the audition. Auspiciously, the audition director, who also ran the public-access station, recognized Sessler from his comedic sketches, particularly his Michael Flatley impression. After performing it upon her request, Sessler obtained the hosting role, a break he attributed to pure luck. Throughout GameSpot TV's production, Sessler honed his presentation skills and gaming knowledge.

Sessler's first co-hosts were Lauren Fielder and John Villarreal. Fielder was the editor-in-chief of GameSpot's sister site VideoGames.com and executive producer of PlayStation Underground's weekly radio show, which was hosted by VideoGames. Fielder moved to a correspondent role in September 1999. Kate Botello, previously co-host of The Screen Savers, became Sessler's co-host on April 29, 2000, and departed on March 29, 2002. Morgan Webb became Sessler's co-host in May 2003 after previously serving as an associate producer and correspondent on The Screen Savers. Because X-Play was Webb's first experience as a host, she studied with a voice coach to ease her transition from her previous role. Kristin Adams joined as a Cheat! correspondent with the program's 2008 overhaul. Following Sessler's departure in April 2012, Blair Herter co-hosted the program with Webb. Sessler and Webb reunited for Bethesda Softworks' press conference at E3 2016 and for a 2020 G4 reunion special.

The program was originally produced and directed by documentarian Annaliza Savage, who served in this position until 2003. From 2008 onward, Matt Keil acted as the program's senior producer, with Wade Beckett as the executive producer. Other crew members during this period include writer Mike Demski and editors Dave Gleason and Justin Dornbush; by 2011, new editors included Brian Sullivan, "KORB!", and Sam Goldfien.

Sessler returned as the primary host of Xplay's revival, and was joined by Froskurinn, The Completionist, and The Black Hokage. Froskurinn departed in September 2022 shortly after a round of layoffs at G4.

== Reception ==
The original incarnation of X-Play was received positively by critics. Josh Krach of The Bryan-College Station Eagle described the program as "extremely watchable", attributing this quality to the network staff's enthusiasm. He praised Sessler for his snarky yet low-key commentary, crediting it for making the content accessible to non-technical viewers and minimizing jargon. He positioned the show as a valuable primer for casual players interested in new releases, industry news, and gossip, while noting it may be less useful for hardcore gamers who rely on other sources. Eric Gwinn of Chicago Tribune proclaimed X-Play as having redefined television programming about video games through the complementary dynamic of Sessler and Webb. He compared the pair to Siskel and Ebert in their field, crediting their intelligence, self-deprecating humor, witty asides, and unique elements (such as cultural references and unconventional segments) for drawing in even non-gamers. Chris Quinn of San Antonio Express-News commended X-Play as the ideal program for gamers seeking quick facts, entertaining insight, and previews without excessive detail. He noted the show's effectiveness in delivering relevant industry tidbits and humorous, occasionally unbiased reviews. He described Sessler and Webb as central to the program's appeal, praising their commentary, voiceovers, and blend of humor, innuendo, and insight, and considered X-Play the best of G4techTV's video game review shows. Vince Horiuchi of The Salt Lake Tribune, in a critique of the programming changes brought about by the network merger, described X-Play as "plagued with chatty hosts and corny skits", saying it was one of the programs most in need of a "face-lift".
