= Players (2002 TV program) =

- Country of origin: United States
- No. of episodes: 58

Production
- Running time: 21–22 minutes

Original release
- Network: G4
- Release: May 1, 2002 – December 10, 2004

Players (styled Player$ for logos) is an American television program focused on video games that aired on G4 (formerly G4techTV) starting in 2002. It was one of the launch programs for the G4 network. The main premise of the show was to interview famous celebrities and see if they played video games or not, what their favorite ones were, etc. The show was cancelled in December 2004, but still aired occasionally until January 6, 2006.

Celebrities featured included Vin Diesel, Robin Williams, Asia Carrera, David Arquette, David Hoffman, Alec Baldwin, Justin Berfield, Chris Carmack and the Barenaked Ladies.
