= Game Makers =

- Country of origin: United States

Production
- Running time: 21–22 minutes (30 minutes w/commercials)

Original release
- Network: G4
- Release: September 4, 2003 – 2006

Game Makers is a TV program that aired on G4 from September 4, 2003, to 2006. The series followed the process of video game development, as a company attempts to finish a new video game in time for shipment. Game Makers aired infrequently and was referred to as a "G4 Special Presentation" rather than a separate entity. The series was cancelled and taken off air in early 2006.

After the revamp of Icons in June 2006, the classic game based episodes of Icons began to air under the name Game Makers, with no relation to the original version of Game Makers.
