= G4 (Canadian TV channel) =

Former Canadian TV channel

- Country: Canada
- Broadcast area: Nationwide
- Headquarters: Toronto, Ontario, Canada

Programming
- Picture format: 1080i (HDTV) (downscaled to letterboxed 480i for the SDTV feed)

Ownership
- Owner: Rogers Sports & Media (Branding licensed from NBCUniversal / Comcast)

History
- Launched: September 7, 2001
- Closed: August 31, 2017
- Former names: TechTV (2001–04); G4techTV (2004–09)

G4 was a Canadian English-language specialty television channel owned by Rogers Media. The name was licensed from NBCUniversal, whose parent company Comcast formerly owned a minority stake in the channel. Based on the U.S. subscription networks TechTV and G4, the channel was originally focused on technology-themed programming.

== History ==
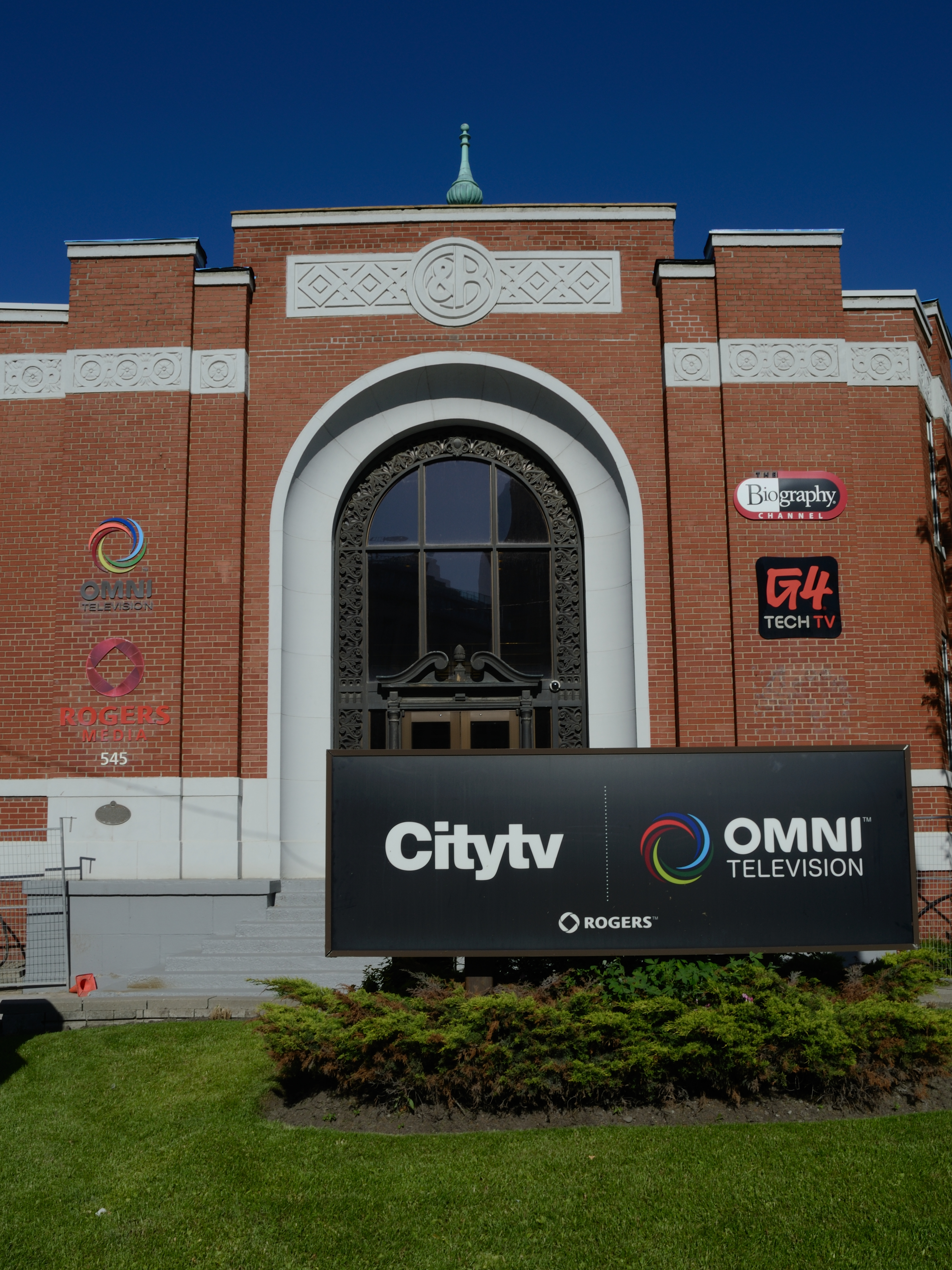
G4 studio in Canada

On November 24, 2000, through a joint venture, Rogers Media (33.34%), Shaw Communications (33.33%) and TechTV US (33.33%) were granted approval by the Canadian Radio-television and Telecommunications Commission (CRTC) to launch a Canadian version of the U.S. television channel TechTV, described by its nature of service as "providing programming about computing, technology and the Internet." The channel launched on September 7, 2001, as the Canadian version of TechTV.

After months of speculation, on March 25, 2004, Comcast announced it would acquire TechTV from Vulcan Programming Inc., with plans to merge TechTV with its own gaming-related channel, G4. As part of the purchase, Comcast acquired TechTV's 33.33% interest in the Canadian version, spinning it off into its subsidiary, G4 Media. The transaction was completed on May 10, and the American services were merged into G4techTV on May 28, 2004. TechTV Canada would follow suit and be renamed G4techTV. On February 15, 2005, less than a year after the merger, the American version was renamed back to G4. In June 2006, Shaw Communications sold its interest in the channel to the managing partner, Rogers Media. At an unknown date, Comcast also sold its interest to Rogers, giving it full ownership.

In 2013, the American version was scheduled to be rebranded as the Esquire Network due to low ratings. However, at the last minute, its parent company decided to rebrand Style Network instead due to the latter's more expanded pay-TV carriage. G4 Canada's social media channels went dormant. However, they were still active after that point, with its website remaining in the same design since the early 2010s (though new content continued to be cycled in). G4 Canada launched a high-definition feed of its own on December 4, 2014, while its American counterpart ceased operations at the end of 2014.

The channel's sole first-run shows, EP Daily and Reviews on the Run ceased broadcast after December 2015, as G4 Canada shifted away from technology-themed programming to more general interest programming. Much of the channel's schedule now consisted of series syndicated from other Rogers television channels, with the CRTC's required tech-related programming relegated to out-of-date library content aired in the morning hours.

On July 5, 2017, Cartt reported via a Rogers representative that G4 would shut down on August 31, 2017, and that it would not be replaced with a new service. The channel shut down at midnight on that date. The channel space created by TechTV in 2001 ceased to exist shortly after. The representative cited "the current competitive television landscape" and a desire to focus on Rogers' "core specialty portfolio"; some of its programming were moved to Citytv. The CRTC approved the revocation of G4's licence in August 2017. On all cable providers, G4 was either replaced by OLN or TSC. By coincidence, G4's Canadian iteration outlasted both its American mother network and Esquire Network, G4's intended replacement, which ended all operations on June 28, 2017. Canada never received the limited relaunch of G4 from the United States in the fall of 2021 before its shutdown nearly a year later, though some of its content was available region-free via YouTube and Twitch.

== Programming ==
The channel primarily aired technology and gaming-related programming acquired from its American counterparts, along with several Canadian-produced series. During its final years, G4 would air reruns of shows sourced from Rogers' sibling networks.

G4 also aired shows like Scott the Woz that were also simultaneously releasing episodes on YouTube.

== Distribution ==
As a category 1 television service, G4 Canada carriage was mandatory for all digital cable and direct broadcast satellite providers in Canada in English-majority markets with channel capacity.

G4, under the name G4techTV, was broadcast internationally in Barbados. The government-owned Caribbean Broadcasting Corporation in Barbados switched from providing the American-based feed, in favour of the Canadian channel for its cable television network known as Multi-Choice TV. The provider discontinued carriage before the network's shutdown.

== See also ==
- G4
- TechTV
