= Yahoo Tech =

Technology news website

Yahoo! Tech
- Website type: Information, News
- Owner: Yahoo!
- Editors: David Pogue & Team
- Website: Yahoo! Tech
- Commercial: Yes
- Registration: Optional
- Launched: January 2014
- Current status: Active

Yahoo! Tech is a technology news web site operated by Yahoo!.

== Former Yahoo! Tech ==
The site, which was the first new product from the Santa Monica, California-based Yahoo! Media Group, featured a selection of original, licensed, and user-generated content, along with product ratings and reviews for thousands of tech products across 19 product categories. Plus, the site could be personalized using its "My Tech" feature, which allows users to save products that they own and would like to research in the future.

The site's original content included a weekly web-based reality show called Hook Me Up, where Yahoo! users got a tech makeover—as well as four featured "Yahoo! Tech Advisors," who blogged about how gadgets and current technology affect their lives from the four very different demographic segments (The Mom, The Techie Diva, The Working Guy, and the Boomer.) Yahoo! Tech's content partners included Consumer Reports, Wiley Publishing's For Dummies series, and McGraw-Hill; and it incorporated Yahoo!'s community, search, and shopping services.

== Former Yahoo! Tech Bloggers ==
- Gina Hughes
- Christopher Null
- Ben Patterson
- Becky Worley
- Alexander Yoon
- Robin Raskin
- Dory Devlin
- Tom Samiljan

== Modern Yahoo! Tech ==
Re-established Q1 2014, David Pogue, who joined Yahoo! after being asked by CEO Marissa Mayer, and his team deliver news on the changing trends of technology in a jargon-free manner.
