= Blister (TV series) =

- Starring: Bill Sindelar
- Country of origin: United States
- No. of episodes: 63

Production
- Running time: 21–22 minutes

Original release
- Network: G4
- Release: May 1, 2002 – January 6, 2004

Blister is a television show that aired on G4 in the United States from 2002 to 2004. Hosted by Bill Sindelar, the series featured action/adventure video game previews, reviews, and interviews with game designers and players.

== History ==
Blister was the first show to air on G4 when the network launched in 2002. The series went to E3, interviewed famous industry insiders, and looked at action games.

In 2003, the first two parts of a planned three-part special titled Blister Declassified premiered. These episodes follow Bill Sindelar's quest to find the Polybius game. However, the show was abruptly cancelled due to the merger between G4 and TechTV, leaving the third part of the special unfinished. However, a complete script had been written for the episode.

The final episode to air was "Skunk'd", a parody of MTV's Punk'd.

Blister was produced by Mike Dunn and Jonathan Solin.

== Selected episodes ==
- "Blister Declassified Part 1": Part 1 of the Search for Polybius.
- "Blister Declassified Part 2": Part 2 of the Search for Polybius.
- "Halloween 2003": Sindelar becomes paranoid when he cannot find his games.
- "End Year Sindelatactular 2003": Year end special that aired at the end of 2003. It was intended to be an annual event, but Blister was cancelled months later.
- "Skunk'd": The final episode, a parody of MTV's Punk'd. Sindelar plays jokes on his fellow G4 hosts.
