= TelevisionWeek =

American weekly trade magazine

- Editor: Greg Baumann
- Categories: Television
- Frequency: Weekly
- Founded: 1982
- First issue: 1982
- Final issue Number: May 2009; 28(13)
- Company: Crain Communications Inc.
- Country: United States
- Based in: Los Angeles; Detroit
- Language: English
- Website: TVWeek.com
- ISSN: 0745-0311

TelevisionWeek was an American trade magazine delivering news, analysis, and data on television and media, owned by Crain Communications Inc. It was founded in 1982 as Electronic Media and published under that title until 2003; the print magazine ceased publication in 2009. The corporate and circulation departments were based at Crain's headquarters in Detroit, with the editorial department in Los Angeles. It was considered a "formidable competitor" to Broadcasting & Cable, the leading trade publication covering the industry.

The magazine was started as the "Electronic Media Edition" of Advertising Age in May 1982 and became its own publication later that year under the name Electronic Media. It covered the broadcasting business more broadly; the moniker was chosen to be flexible depending on the development of the industry. Lee Goldberg, one of its former reporters, noted that it was heavy on coverage of the broadcast syndication market, which also generated much of its advertising. With the retitling as TelevisionWeek, it sought to be a general magazine for television executives, noting that its competitors were either too focused on regulatory matters, catered to cable, or primarily covered film.

Consolidation in television syndication and station ownership lessened the readership and advertising base of the publication in the 2000s. In 2009, Crain shut down print publication of TelevisionWeek, retaining its website in a reduced capacity and spinning out the NewsPro insert as a monthly magazine.

== Website ==
The magazine's website, TVWeek.com, featured a number of blogs; some such as Access Hollywood Confidential, by Access Hollywood producer Rob Silverstein, were created by members of the television community. Among its notable columnists were Inside Edition's Deborah Norville and Pulitzer Prize-winning television critic Tom Shales.
