= Conspiracies (TV series) =

- Conspiracies logo
- Country of origin: United Kingdom
- Original language: English
- No. of episodes: 13

Production
- Running time: 30 minutes

Original release
- Network: BBC Choice
- Release: 2 January – 27 March 2001

Conspiracies is a documentary television programme produced by the BBC and broadcast on both BBC Choice (from 2 January 2001) and TechTV (from 1 October 2003). The series was hosted by Clive Anderson. Though a small number of episodes were produced, they focused on a variety of well known conspiracy theories.

== Episodes ==
- The New World Order: Are there secret societies that constitute a shadow government that rules the world?
- Aliens: Are extraterrestrials behind phenomena such as mysterious lights in the sky, abductions and crop circles?
- The Spying Game: Myths and mysteries surrounding espionage organizations such as the CIA.
- Government Cover-Ups? (Disasters): Have politicians covered up the truth in the tragedies of TWA 800, at Oklahoma and in Waco?
- Satanic Panic: Are Satan's minions among us, creating havoc through everything from rock music to liberal education policies?
- Death of an Icon (Iconic Death): Assassination theories about the deaths of prominent people, including JFK and his brother Bobby, and Princess Diana and Dodi Fayed.
- Hidden Places: Exploring secret spots all over the globe, from Area 51 in Nevada to subterranean supercomputers and rumors of a tropical paradise inside the Earth.
- Big Brother: As the wired world becomes ever more intrusive, are we becoming vulnerable to the all-seeing eye of big brother?
- American Presidents: Are presidential political scandals the result of media leaks, or carefully planned manipulation by the government?
- Body Panic: Are some of us being used as unwilling guinea pigs in the development of biological weapons, such as HIV and Gulf War Syndrome?
- Outer Space Hoax: Was the Moon landing a hoax? Are there alien bases on the Moon? Is it true that astronauts have seen UFOs? And what was really found on Mars?
- Green Science: Is big business suppressing the development of free energy sources such as cold fusion? What about genetically modified foods?
- Rock 'N' Roll Deaths: What are the true stories behind the sordid deaths of rock and roll stars? Is Elvis still alive? Is Paul McCartney really alive?
