= Future Fighting Machines =

Television program

Future Fighting Machines was a TV programme which examines the latest innovations in military hardware and military technology. It was produced by Tiger Aspect Productions. It has been broadcast on The Discovery Channel, TechTV and UKTV History. Each episode ran for 30 minutes, and the show ran for two seasons. The programme shows the ambition of weapon developers worldwide to make soldiers less vulnerable and more lethal. The program also looks at new weapons that strike more accurately and unmanned vehicles run entirely by computers. The programme made comparisons between rival weapon systems of different countries, showing advantages and disadvantages of weapons. There was also a profile of a different special forces unit in each episode.

List of episodes:

- Camouflage technology
- Virtual reality training for soldiers
- The future of warfare
- An American warship
- Methods of destroying tanks
- Unmanned underwater vehicles
- America's latest amphibious assault vehicle
- The Apache Longbow helicopter
- The world's largest unmanned spy plane
- The Joint Strike Fighter
- Mine warfare technology
- A new flying petrol station
- The dangers of future urban combat
- A portable missile launcher
- A trimaran warship
- A missile defence system
- Amphibious landings and missiles
- The LLP parachute
- Britain's navy destroyers
- Sub-machine guns
- The world of the sniper
- An electronic bullet system
- The B1B Lancer
