= Icons (TV series) =

2002 American TV series

- Icons logo
- Genre: Documentary
- Narrated by: Jake Steele
- Country of origin: United States
- Original language: English
- No. of seasons: 5
- No. of episodes: 88

Production
- Executive producers: Jacqueline Bender; Susie Lewis; Peter Green; Jim Downs; Wade Beckett
- Producers: Tom Myers; Charmaine Murillo
- Running time: 20-22 minutes

Original release
- Network: G4
- Release: May 1, 2002 – March 4, 2007

Icons is an American documentary TV show that aired on G4 from May 1, 2002, to March 4, 2007. It originally focused on significant people, companies, products, history, and milestones in the world of video games.

On May 10, 2006, it was announced that Icons was relaunching on June 3 with an episode focusing on J. J. Abrams. The relaunch was an attempt to feature a broader scope on things and people that "men 18–34 care about, admire and emulate." Recent episodes about George A. Romero, Frank Miller and the history of the King Kong franchise had aired prior to the announcement. The final season focused on pop culture subjects such as Marc Ecko, The Onion, and Family Guy. The classic video game themed episodes continued to air on the network sporadically until 2009, under the new name of Game Makers, unrelated to the G4 series of the same name.

== Episodes ==
=== Season 1 ===
#	Title	Production Code	Content	U.S. air date	Ref.
1	"Oddworld"	101	Oddworld Inhabitants	May 1, 2002	
2	"Nolan Bushnell"	102	Nolan Bushnell	May 1, 2002	
3	"Pac-Man"	103	Pac-Man	May 6, 2002	
4	"Lara Croft"	104	Lara Croft	May 19, 2002	
5	"Activision"	105	Activision	June 9, 2002	
6	"Miyamoto"	106	Shigeru Miyamoto	June 16, 2002	
7	"EverQuest"	107	EverQuest	July 7, 2002	
8	"Bioware"	108	BioWare	July 28, 2002	
9	"Will Wright"	109	Will Wright	August 18, 2002	
10	"Women in Gaming"	110	women video game company CEOs	September 1, 2002	
11	"Insomniac Games"	111	Insomniac Games	September 22, 2002	
12	"Sid Meier"	112	Sid Meier	October 6, 2002	
13	"Scary Games"	113	horror games	October 27, 2002	
14	"Richard Garriott"	114	Richard Garriott	November 10, 2002	
15	"Bruce Shelley"	115	Bruce Shelley	November 24, 2002	
16	"John Madden NFL Football"	116	Madden NFL	December 15, 2002	
17	"Splinter Cell"	117	Tom Clancy's Splinter Cell	December 18, 2002	
18	"Lord of the Rings"	118	The Lord of the Rings: The Fellowship of the Ring (Vivendi Universal)	December 23, 2002	

=== Season 2 ===
#	Title	Production Code	Content	U.S. air date	Ref.
1	"Atari"	201	Atari	January 19, 2003	
2	"Game Music"	202	video game musicians	February 2, 2003	
3	"Unreal"	203	Unreal	February 16, 2003	
4	"Yu Suzuki"	204	Yu Suzuki	March 2, 2003	
5	"Intellivision"	205	Intellivision	March 23, 2003	
6	"The Legend of Zelda"	206	The Legend of Zelda series	March 27, 2003	
7	"Xbox"	207	Xbox	April 10, 2003	
8	"Arcade"	208	Video arcades	April 28, 2003	
9	"The History of E3"	209	History of E3	May 22, 2003	
10	"LucasArts"	210	LucasArts	June 5, 2003	
11	"Red Storm"	211	Red Storm Entertainment	June 12, 2003	
12	"Warren Spector"	212	Warren Spector	June 19, 2003	
13	"PC Gaming"	213	Personal computer gaming	July 10, 2003	
14	"The Crash"	214	Video game crash of 1983	July 24, 2003	
15	"Games in the Military"	215	Military simulation	August 7, 2003	
16	"Naughty Dog"	216	Naughty Dog	September 25, 2003	
17	"Mario"	217	Mario	August 21, 2003	
18	"Onimusha"	218	Onimusha Halloween '03	October 16, 2003	
19	"Mega Man"	219	Mega Man series	November 20, 2003	
20	"Yuji Naka"	220	Yuji Naka	December 11, 2003	
21	"Final Fantasy"	221	Final Fantasy	January 15, 2004	
22	"Dungeons and Dragons"	222	Dungeons & Dragons	January 29, 2004	

=== Season 3 ===
#	Title	Production Code	Content	U.S. air date	Ref.
1	"Music Games"	301	Music games	February 12, 2004	
2	"Dreamcast"	302	Dreamcast	March 11, 2004	
3	"ESRB"	303	ESRB	March 25, 2004	
4	"Peter Molyneux"	304	Peter Molyneux	April 8, 2004	
5	"Tetris"	305	Tetris	April 22, 2004	
6	"Electronic Arts"	306	Electronic Arts	May 6, 2004	
7	"Game Boy"	307	Game Boy	June 10, 2004	
8	"Donkey Kong"	308	Donkey Kong	June 24, 2004	
9	"Nobuo Uematsu"	309	Nobuo Uematsu	July 8, 2004	
10	"The DOOM Franchise"	310	Doom	July 22, 2004	
11	"Dead or Alive"	311	Dead or Alive	August 5, 2004	
12	"SNK"	312	SNK	August 19, 2004	
13	"Mortal Kombat"	313	Mortal Kombat	September 2, 2004	
14	"Prince of Persia"	314	Prince of Persia	September 30, 2004	
15	"Mark Cuban"	315	Mark Cuban	October 14, 2004	
16	"Metal Gear Solid"	316	Metal Gear series	October 28, 2004	
17	"Half-Life"	317	Half-Life	November 16, 2004	
18	"Bungie"	318	Bungie	December 9, 2004	
19	"Apple II"	319	Apple II	January 6, 2005	
20	"Fighting Games"	320	fighting games	January 20, 2005	

=== Season 4 ===
#	Title	Production Code	Content	U.S. air date	Ref.
1	"Gran Turismo"	5001	Gran Turismo	February 3, 2005	
2	"Splinter Cell"	5002	Splinter Cell	March 3, 2005	
3	"Frank Miller"	5003	Frank Miller	March 31, 2005	
4	"Tim Schafer"	5004	Tim Schafer	April 28, 2005	
5	"Star Wars Games"	5005	Star Wars video games	May 12, 2005	
6	"Ralph Baer"	5006	Ralph Baer	June 9, 2005	
7	"PlayStation"	5007	PlayStation	September 8, 2005	
8	"George A. Romero"	5008	George A. Romero	October 31, 2005	
9	"Xbox 360"	5009	Xbox 360	December 4, 2005	
10	"NES"	5010	Nintendo Entertainment System	December 1, 2005	
11	"King Kong"	5011	King Kong	December 12, 2005	

=== Season 5 ===
#	Title	Production Code	Content	U.S. air date	Ref.
1	"ICONS: J. J. Abrams"	6001	J. J. Abrams	June 3, 2006	
2	"ICONS: Suicide Girls"	6002	SuicideGirls	June 10, 2006; July 1, 2006 (uncut version)	
3	"ICONS: Marc Ecko"	6003	Marc Ecko	June 17, 2006	
4	"ICONS: Michelle Rodriguez"	6004	Michelle Rodríguez	June 24, 2006	
5	"ICONS: Kevin Smith"	6005	Kevin Smith	July 15, 2006	
6	"ICONS: Jamie Kennedy"	6006	Jamie Kennedy	July 22, 2006	
7	"ICONS: Shepard Fairey"	6007	Shepard Fairey	August 12, 2006	
8	"ICONS: Seth Green"	6008	Seth Green	August 19, 2006	
9	"ICONS: Lollapalooza"	6009	Lollapalooza	August 26, 2006	
10	"ICONS: The Onion"	6010	The Onion	September 2, 2006	
11	"ICONS: British Music Invasion"	6011	British rock (focus on indie bands Oceansize and Nine Black Alps)	September 24, 2006	
12	"ICONS: Chuck 'The Ice Man' Liddell"	6012	Chuck Liddell	December 17, 2006	
13	"ICONS: Sacha Baron Cohen"	6013	Sacha Baron Cohen	November 3, 2006	
14	"ICONS: Tom 'Tsquared' Taylor"	6014	Tsquared	December 10, 2006	
15	"ICONS: Tony 'Mad Dog' Alva"	6015	Tony Alva	December 24, 2006	
16	"ICONS: Frank Miller"	6017	Frank Miller	March 4, 2007	

== Specially released episodes ==
At least six of these episodes were put onto versions of the games they were about.

- Episode 112, "Sid Meier," was put in the game of the year edition of Civilization IV.
- Episode 116, "John Madden NFL Football," was featured as part of the Madden 2005: Collector's Edition for PlayStation 2.
- Episode 117, "Splinter Cell," was featured on the Splinter Cell: Chaos Theory collectors disc for the PlayStation 2.
- Episode 219, "Mega Man," was featured on the Nintendo GameCube and Xbox versions of Mega Man Anniversary Collection (Though some of the content featured in the original episode that was unrelated to Mega Man or Capcom was removed).
- Episode 310, "The DOOM Franchise," was featured on the Doom 3 Collector's Edition for Xbox
- Episode 311, "Dead or Alive", was included as an unlockable movie in Dead or Alive Ultimate.
