= TechTV =

American cable channel

- Country: United States
- Affiliates: KTQW
- Headquarters: San Francisco, California

Programming
- Language: English

Ownership
- Owner: Ziff-Davis (1998–2000); Vulcan Ventures (2000–2004); G4 Media (2004)

History
- Launched: May 11, 1998; 28 years ago, as ZDTV
- Closed: May 28, 2004; 22 years ago
- Replaced by: G4techTV (2004–2005); G4 (2005–2014, 2021–2022)
- Former names: ZDTV (1998–2000)

Links
- Website: Archived website

TechTV was an American cable television channel with a focus on technology. It was launched as ZDTV on May 11, 1998, by computer magazine publisher Ziff-Davis following two short-lived technology-based programs by the company. Initially targeting tech enthusiasts with programming including The Screen Savers, Call for Help and GameSpot TV (later named Extended Play and then X-Play), it aimed to report and inform on computers and the internet during the dot-com bubble.

In 2000, ZDTV was sold to Vulcan Ventures, owned by Paul Allen, and rebranded as TechTV. As the dot-com bubble burst, the network shifted toward broader tech-related content such as gaming and pop culture. The anime programming block Anime Unleashed premiered during this time, as well as a late-night block on which the revamped X-Play debuted. Although the network had a reach of 43 million homes, its ratings remained scant.

Facing ongoing operating losses and the growth of the internet, TechTV merged with Comcast's G4 network in 2004. The network briefly become G4techTV before the TechTV brand was phased out entirely by 2005, as G4 pivoted to a younger, gaming-centric audience. X-Play, Call for Help and the Anime Unleashed block outlived their original network, and a number of TechTV alumni went on to establish the multi-channel network Revision3.

== History ==
=== Origins ===
On August 20, 1994, computer magazine publisher Ziff-Davis entered the television industry with the premiere of The Personal Computing Show, a program that aired on Saturday mornings on CNBC, America's Talking and the Jones Computing Network. The Personal Computing Show, co-hosted by Jim Louderback and Gina Smith, targeted a growing demographic of personal computer owners and demonstrated how to purchase, install, maintain and repair personal computers and peripheral devices such as printers. Shortly after The Personal Computing Show's premiere, Ziff-Davis revealed plans to produce a second show in October 1994 named PC Update, a half-hour Sunday morning news program hosted by Leo Laporte and focusing on the computer industry. According to Ziff-Davis spokesman Gregory Jarboe, The Personal Computing Show was unsuccessful due to its relegation to odd channels and timeslots. When Ziff-Davis's sale to investment firm Forstmann Little & Company was announced in October 1994, a small Foster City-based television operation named "ZD-TV" was listed as a company asset.

In April 1996, Ziff-Davis announced the establishment of ZDTV as a San Francisco-based unit specializing in the production of television and internet broadcasts, which would allow the publisher to showcase its products. Its first project was to develop The Site, a daily hour-long prime time news show co-hosted by Soledad O'Brien about the increasing social and economic effects of technology. The program aired on the cable news network MSNBC, which launched on July 15, 1996. It was the third San Francisco-based television program specializing in technology after CNET Central and Cyberlife. According to Ziff-Davis chief executive Larry Wangberg, San Francisco was chosen as ZDTV's headquarters for its proximity to Silicon Valley and easy access to Multimedia Gulch-based talent.

On May 6, 1997, Ziff-Davis announced its plan to launch ZDTV as a 24-hour interactive cable network specializing in computers and the internet. The publisher put $100 million (equivalent to $200.56 million in 2025) behind the project and planned to debut the ZDTV channel in early 1998. Projected programming for the channel included talk shows on the impact of technology, business-oriented shows evaluating investments in high-tech stocks, and reviews of software and hardware. Children's programming was also planned for the weekends. The channel had 11 initial charter advertisers, including IBM, Gateway 2000, Microsoft, and Charles Schwab. Ziff-Davis chairman and CEO Eric Hippeau cited the increasing presence of computers in cable television homes and workspaces as motivation for filling the niche of programming about computers, saying "This is a huge audience and it will only get bigger". Wangberg, who would be made the network's CEO, proclaimed Ziff-Davis's ambition of ZDTV becoming "to computing what CNN is to news, what ESPN is to sports". Although Ziff-Davis intended to continue producing The Site for MSNBC following ZDTV's launch, the show was canceled in September 1997 as a result of the network's shift toward an all-news format. In December 1997, Ziff-Davis revealed at the Western Cable Trade Show in Anaheim that it had secured agreements with four cable operators to carry the network: Prime Cable in Las Vegas, Harron Communications in Detroit, Televue in Georgia, and Prestige Cable in Georgia, North Carolina, Virginia, and Maryland.

=== ZDTV ===
ZDTV logo

ZDTV was initially set to launch at the end of 1998's first quarter but was delayed by Ziff-Davis's initial public offering, which was announced on February 18. ZDTV was separated from Ziff-Davis's publishing operations so as to prevent the former's start-up losses from impacting the latter's balance sheet. The network launched on May 11, 1998, on cable systems in Las Vegas, Detroit, parts of Georgia near Atlanta, and parts of Maine. Inaugural programs included the computer help show Call for Help, the round table public affairs talk show Silicon Spin, the financial advisory show The Money Machine, the website review show Internet Tonight and the technological product review show Fresh Gear. The channel had six hours of original programming a day, which at the outset were looped to provide a 24-hour schedule. A program by video gaming website GameSpot was projected for a mid-summer release and premiered as GameSpot TV on July 4. On August 1, ZDTV became available nationally on DirecTV as channel 273. In November, Microsoft co-founder Paul Allen's holding company Vulcan Ventures invested $54 million (equivalent to $106.67 million in 2025) in ZDTV, granting it a 33-percent stake in the network.

Although ZDTV was critically acclaimed, it struggled to gain a foothold on certain cable lineups, in part because Ziff-Davis eschewed the types of launch fees to cable operators—ranging from $100 to $150 million—that other new channels were providing. It strained to achieve carriage from AT&T/TCI cable lineups and was deemed unprofitable. In an effort to sell company assets to reduce debt and boost its share price, Ziff-Davis put ZDTV up for sale on July 16, 1999. In November 1999, Vulcan purchased the remaining two-thirds in a transaction that was completed on January 21, 2000. The deal (which permitted the network to retain its name) was worth $204.8 million (equivalent to $395.81 million in 2025).

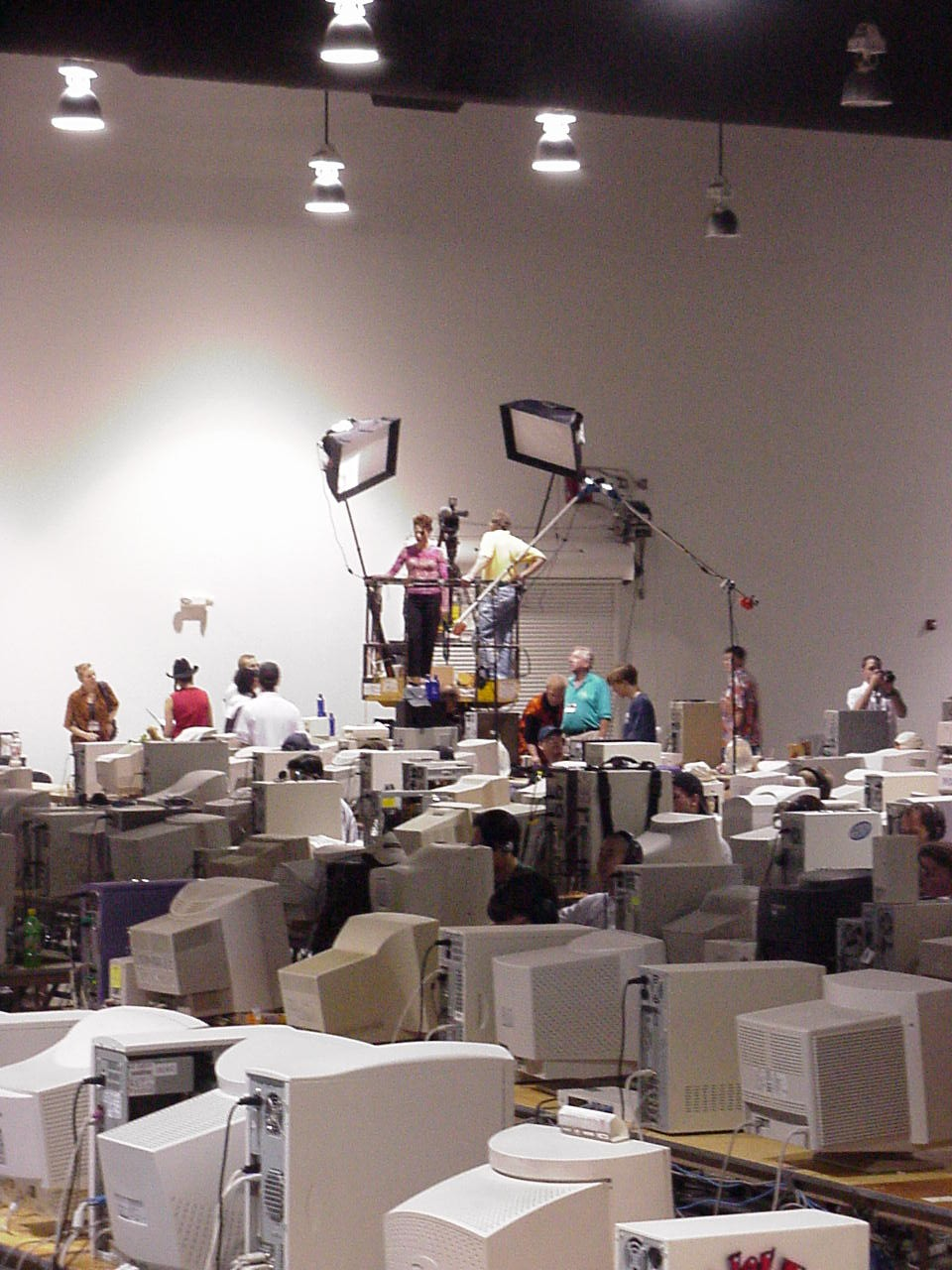
A ZDTV crew covering QuakeCon 2000

=== TechTV ===
On August 21, 2000, ZDTV's name was changed to TechTV, and Wangberg announced that the network would be added to AT&T and Time Warner Cable's digital cable lineups the following month. In November, TechTV announced the live programming block TechLive, which would premiere on April 2, 2001. Originally scheduled at six hours (five of which would be live), the block's length was finalized at 9.5 hours, and the network described the block as the "nucleus of TechTV's daytime programming". For this venture, the network established a fully digital broadcast center in San Francisco as well as bureaus in New York City, Washington, D.C., Silicon Valley, and Seattle. The block also included a ticker which listed the status of leading tech stocks.

On February 17, 2001, GameSpot TV was retitled Extended Play and became part of TechTV's live broadcasting endeavor, which resulted in a high employee turnover rate. On March 15, TechTV announced that it had laid off approximately a dozen employees as part of a reorganization effort in the face of the waning dot-com bubble. On November 16, TechTV announced another layoff of 130 employees. This, combined with the reduction of TechLive and indifferent online reactions to TechTV's struggles, were interpreted by Farhad Manjoo of Wired as a sign of declining cultural interest in technology. Anonymous TechTV employees remarked that the increasingly ubiquitous nature of the Internet had rendered the network's mission statement "a bit fantastical" and suggested that the only reason the network was still in business was because "Allen doesn't know what to do with his billions".

During this time, TechTV expanded internationally. On September 7, 2001, TechTV Canada began broadcasting as one of 16 new English-language digital cable channels approved by the Canadian Radio-television and Telecommunications Commission (CRTC); it was owned by TechTV as well as Canadian companies Rogers Broadcasting and Shaw Communications. By 2002, it had 467,000 subscribers.

Wangberg announced on January 24, 2002, that he would spend the following months searching for a successor in his chairman and CEO position, though at Allen's request he planned to remain on the network's board of directors as well as take a position on Charter Communications's board. On March 19, TechTV announced its intent to shift focus from tech news and information to consumer-oriented fare. In pursuit of this, the network cancelled Silicon Spin as well as the digital music program AudioFile; according to senior vice president Greg Drebin, the former series in particular "was targeted a little more to the industry than our viewers accepted". On April 24, TechLive was cut further to a thirty-minute daily news magazine show with a stronger focus on technology's cultural aspect, resulting in 50 more employees being dismissed. The airtime previously occupied by the now-diminished TechLive was filled by acquired programs that reflected the network's new focus, including Max Headroom, Techno Games, Future Fighting Machines, and Thunderbirds. The network also acquired the rights for the films Coma (1978), Demon Seed (1977), and Forbidden Planet (1956). By October, the network was affiliated with Wichita-based low-power television station KTQW, its content occupying the prime time, late-night, and graveyard slots. The anime programming block Anime Unleashed premiered on December 30 with the debut of Crest of the Stars. In 2002, TechTV was the top-ranked cable network for men ages 25-54 in the Nielsen ratings.

The network continued expanding into lifestyle programming through 2003. On January 6, senior vice president of programming Greg Brannan announced the upcoming series Wired for Sex as well as the acquisition of the Bravo series Spy School. Both series would premiere in primetime on the week of April 28. Allison Romano of Broadcasting & Cable reported in February that the network's ratings had hovered at 0.1 despite a reach of 40 million homes; TechTV head of marketing Gaynor Strachan Chun added that the network's independent status impeded its ability to cross-promote across any sister or cousin network.

On March 3, Brannan announced the upcoming launch of a late-night programming block on April 28. The block would air Monday through Thursday and lead off with the acquired British series Robot Wars. The revamped Extended Play, now named X-Play, was moved to this block and became a ratings success. Anime Unleashed, already a late-night fixture, aired on the block's tail end. On May 26, the late-night talk show Unscrewed with Martin Sargent premiered on the block. Similar changes were blocked in Canada by the CRTC, which denied approval to let TechTV Canada show dramas or comedies.

=== Merger and consolidation ===
In May 2003, TechTV retained Greenbridge Partners investment banker Mike Yagemann to explore partners or buyers for the network. According to an executive familiar with the network, it had incurred $120 million (equivalent to $210.02 million in 2025) in operating losses for owner Paul Allen since its 2000 acquisition. In December, rumors circulated of an impending purchase of TechTV by Comcast, the largest American cable carrier at the time. Such a purchase was expected to entail the merger of TechTV with Comcast's own video gaming channel G4. On March 25, 2004, Comcast announced its purchase of TechTV, estimated by close sources to be under $300 million (equivalent to $511.36 million in 2025), as well as its upcoming merger of the network with G4. At the time of the purchase, TechTV was available in 43 million households via cable and satellite, while G4 was available in 1.5 million households, thus allowing the combined network to reach 44 million households.

John Higgins of Broadcasting & Cable pointed out that TechTV's ratings were minuscule despite its reach, signifying the network's difficulty in securing viewers in the increasingly fragmented market of cable television. Dan Fost of the San Francisco Chronicle also mentioned that the network's layoffs and programming changes were necessitated by the dot-com crash eliminating several of the network's advertisers. TechTV chief operating officer Joseph Gillespie, in 2018, recalled that the sale was driven by the acknowledgement of the internet proving to be a superior platform for publishing and distributing diverse, fast-evolving technology content, as television was too slow and costly. He noted the irony of TechTV being disrupted by the very technology it covered.

Around May 6, TechTV announced the termination of 285 employees from the San Francisco office by July 16, allowing approximately 80 to 100 employees to transition to G4's main office in Los Angeles if they agreed to relocate there. On May 10, Comcast completed its acquisition of TechTV from Vulcan, and merged it with G4 to form G4techTV on May 28. TechTV Canada underwent a similar name change on the same day.

On January 11, 2005, G4 founder and CEO Charles Hirschhorn announced that, effective February 15, G4techTV's name would revert to G4 and receive a new presentation and programming primarily targeting male gamers in the 12–34 age bracket. Hirschhorn intended to veer the network away from TechTV's older tech enthusiast audience in favor of teenage males, and according to insiders, the G4techTV title was a temporary measure to appease cable operators, with a complete G4 brand being the ultimate goal. James Hibberd of TelevisionWeek, in hindsight, equated the merger to a real estate transaction to increase G4's circulation. G4techTV Canada's branding would remain until 2009, when it became a Canadian version of G4.

== Programs ==
The following is a partial list of programs aired by TechTV.

=== Original programming ===
- AudioFile – a weekly program that focused on technology's increasing role in the music industry.
- Big Thinkers – a weekly interactive program that conducted interviews with the technology industry's visionaries.
- Call for Help – a prime-time interactive program in which viewers could call, email or netcam for assistance in solving computer problems.
- Computer Shopper – a weekly program that provided information about computer hardware and software products and how to buy them intelligently.
- CyberCrime – a weekly program that investigated dangers to computer users such as fraud, hacking, viruses, cybersex crimes, and invasions of privacy.
- Digital Avenue – a prime-time program in which manufacturers presented in-depth demonstrations of their latest products.
- Eye Drops – a weekly showcase of computer-animated shorts.
- Fresh Gear – a weekly program that reviewed technological gadgets.
- Internet Tonight – a prime-time program that showcased people and personalities who specialized in the Internet.
- Invent This! – a weekly prime-time program that showcased inventors.
- Let 'er Rip – a prime-time program that showcased mechanical competitions.
- Microsoft Insider Live – a pair of special live events that aired on October 5 and November 2, 2002. Each event was an interactive broadcast that showcased five new products from Microsoft. The event offered product demos, giveaways and an insider look at Microsoft Research & Development.
- The Money Machine – a daytime program that gave expert financial advice concerning computers and the Internet.
- Nerd Nation – a weekly prime-time program that focused on nerd sub-cultures.
- Performance – a weekly program that covered technology's role in the world of sports.
- The Screen Savers – a prime-time program that covered the latest computing products and demonstrated their effective use at home and the workplace.
- Secret, Strange & True – a weekly program that focused on bio-technology.
- Silicon Spin – an interactive prime-time program in which computing industry leaders discussed current technology events and featured viewer commentary through email, chat, and videophone.
- The Tech of: – a weekly prime-time program that focused on the workings of technology used in everyday life.
- TechLive – formerly ZDTV News (1998–2000) and TechTV News (2000–2001); a bi-daily news program that covered current events of the technology industry.
- The Technotainment Zone – a weekly morning program in which Best Buy customers discussed the convergence of the technology and entertainment industries and how Best Buy could help get them the most that both industries had to offer.
- Titans of Tech – a weekly series of biographies that profiled figures in the technology industry.
- Unscrewed with Martin Sargent – a daily showcase of "the darker, funnier, sexier world of technology and the Internet".
- Wired for Sex – a weekly prime-time program that focused on technology's role in human sexuality.
- Working the Web – a weekly program that provided information, advice, and resources for entrepreneurs and emerging companies to set up businesses on the Internet.
- X-Play – formerly GameSpot TV (1998–2001) and Extended Play (2001–2003); a weekly program that provided reviews, tips and tricks, and previews for contemporary video games.
- You Made It – a program that showcased homemade netcam videos.
- Zip File – an abridged selection of ZDTV's other programs hosted by animated characters Dash and Tilde.

=== Acquired programming ===
- Anime Unleashed – a programming block of science fiction anime.
  - Armitage III: Poly-Matrix
  - Banner of the Stars
  - Betterman
  - Boogiepop Phantom
  - Crest of the Stars
  - Dual! Parallel Trouble Adventure
  - Gate Keepers 21
  - Geneshaft
  - Last Exile
  - Serial Experiments Lain
  - Silent Möbius
  - The SoulTaker
- Beyond Tomorrow
- Body Hits
- Conspiracies
- Future Fighting Machines
- Max Headroom
- Robot Wars
- Spy School
- Techno Games
- Thunderbirds
- Tomorrow's World

== Staff ==
=== Executives ===
ZDTV's original executive lineup consisted primarily of television veterans; chairman and CEO Larry Wangberg was previously CEO of Times Mirror Cable Television, senior vice president of programming Greg Drebin previously served the same position at MTV, and news director Harry Fuller previously worked for KPIX-TV and KGO-TV. TechTV's executive vice president, COO and acting CEO Joseph Gillespie previously managed sales and marketing for Ziff-Davis. Jim Louderback, apart from hosting Fresh Gear, also served as the network's vice president and editorial director. By 2003, the senior vice president of programming position was inherited by Greg Brannan, formerly of E!.

=== Hosts and correspondents ===
Morgan Webb co-hosted X-Play with Adam Sessler beginning in 2003 after previously serving as associate producer of The Screen Savers. Sessler hosted X-Play from the show's debut as GameSpot TV; he was previously a banker and actor on a public-access San Francisco program that ZDTV's casting director happened to be a fan of. Erica Hill was an anchor of TechTV News/TechLive, having previously served as a production assistant on PC Week's online news radio program PC Week Radio. She anchored live coverage of the September 11 attacks during her time on the network. Leo Laporte was the host of The Screen Savers and Call for Help.

Other TechTV personalities include John C. Dvorak of Silicon Spin, Michaela Pereira of Internet Tonight and TechLive, Chris Pirillo of Call for Help, Kate Botello of The Screen Savers and GameSpot TV/Extended Play, Becky Worley of TechLive, Martin Sargent of The Screen Savers and Unscrewed with Martin Sargent, Carmine Gallo and Pam Krueger of The Money Machine, Victoria Recaño of TechTV News, Laura Swisher of Unscrewed with Martin Sargent, and Kris Kosach of AudioFile. Botello also provided the motion capture performance and voice of the animated character Tilde, the network's mascot and host of Zip File.

== Legacy ==
X-Play continued airing on G4 until its cancellation in 2012. Following the 2004 cancellation of Call for Help in the United States, a Toronto-produced revival began airing on G4techTV Canada in August 2004. In 2007, the program was retitled The Lab with Leo Laporte, and production was moved to Greedy Productions in Vancouver. The Anime Unleashed block continued airing on G4 until its discontinuation in March 2006. Arthell Isom, co-founder of the Japanese animation studio D'Art Shtajio, cited Anime Unleashed as his inspiration to pursue his animation career.

Bob Taylor of The Herald in Rock Hill, South Carolina, in a 2007 review of G4, proclaimed TechTV to have been "far superior" and condemned Comcast for its purchase of the network and cancellation of the bulk of its programming, describing the merger as an "execution". Multi-channel network Revision3, the roster of which included a number of TechTV alumni, was regarded by David Sarno of the Los Angeles Times as a "genetic descendant" of the network.
