= G4 (American TV network) =

American television channel

- Country: United States
- Broadcast area: Nationwide
- Headquarters: 1840 Victory Boulevard, Glendale, California, U.S.

Programming
- Language: English

Ownership
- Owner: Comcast Spectacor
- Parent: G4 Media

History
- Launched: April 24, 2002; 24 years ago (original); November 16, 2021; 5 years ago (relaunch)
- Founder: Charles Hirschhorn
- Replaced: TechTV
- Closed: December 31, 2014; 11 years ago (original); October 16, 2022; 4 years ago (relaunch)
- Former names: G4techTV (2004–2005)

G4 (also known as G4TV) was an American pay television and former digital network owned by NBCUniversal and later Comcast Spectacor that primarily focused on video games, technology, pop culture, and gaming culture.

The network was originally owned by G4 Media, a joint venture between the NBCUniversal Cable division of NBCUniversal and Dish Network by the time of the channel's initial closure, and G4 first launched on April 24, 2002. In late 2012, the network's final studio programming were canceled in preparation for a planned relaunch as the Esquire Network, as part of a licensing deal with Hearst Corporation, owner of Esquire magazine. Esquire Network would ultimately replace Style Network instead, on September 23, 2013. G4 announced in November 2014 that it would be closing after several years of decline. The original network shut down on December 31, 2014. By August 2013, it was reported that approximately 61,217,000 American households (53.61% of households with television) were receiving the network.

On July 24, 2020, a revival of the G4 brand was announced; the network officially relaunched on November 16, 2021. On October 16, 2022, Comcast announced that the network would immediately cease operations for a second time due to low viewership and inadequate financial performance.

== History ==
=== Launch ===
On November 28, 2001, Comcast announced G4 as a 24-hour, seven-day-a-week television network specializing in entertainment, news and information for video game enthusiasts, slated for an April 2002 launch. The initial concept was to create a service similar to rival TechTV but targeted at 12-to-34-year-olds, an elusive demographic. The channel's projected programming included 13 weekly series and specials focused on electronic games, including previews, documentaries, competitions, news, events, game tips, and reviews. G4 founder and CEO Charles Hirschhorn expected video game creators themselves to eventually produce programming for the channel. He envisioned that G4 could follow in the footsteps of MTV, which provided music video producers with a venue for non-traditional television programming. The network's slate of programming was revealed on April 9, 2002, and it was soft launched on April 24 with a week-long series of Pong matches. It was initially available to three million Comcast subscribers.

Hirschhorn intended G4 to become a vehicle for unconventional advertising. G4 offered advertisers wide latitude to place their products on G4's programs, and even allowed their commercials to appear as if they were a part of the program. G4 offered what was called a "2 minute unit", which was an advertising package played as if it were part of a G4 program that was long enough to run an entire movie trailer. G4 offered to sell the right to have a game showcased on the show Pulse.

=== Merger and retool ===
On March 25, 2004, Vulcan Inc. announced that G4 Media would acquire TechTV and merge the two networks. The combined network was rebranded as G4techTV. On February 15, 2005, less than a year after the merger, the "TechTV" brand was removed from the channel's name. A Canadian version of TechTV, originally launched on September 7, 2001, would also be relaunched under the "G4techTV" branding and would retain the brand until 2009.

In September 2005, Neal Tiles replaced Hirschhorn as the channel's president. Tiles had previously been a senior marketing executive at DirecTV, Fox Sports and ESPN. He announced in May 2006 that G4 would be retooled as a male-oriented channel, stating that "guys like to play games, but not necessarily watch a bunch of shows with games on the screen".

Comcast announced on October 12, 2006, that it would consolidate its west coast entertainment operations, including G4, E! and Style Network into a new group headed by Ted Harbert, who had formerly run E!. It was announced that the upper management of the G4 channel would relocate to E!'s Los Angeles office. Harbert gave his opinion at the time that the focus of the channel on "gaming has been demonstrated as being too narrow."

On February 17, 2009, it was reported that G4 intended to cut back its original programming. X-Play would be reduced to three nights a week while Attack of the Show! would be cut to four nights a week. Consequently, a number of the staff and production crew involved in the shows would be laid off. It was announced during Comic-Con 2010 that G4 would be the exclusive North American broadcaster of Marvel Anime, which made its television debut in 2011. During the week of July 26-August 1, 2010, G4 temporarily changed its logo to 4G as a promotion for Sprint Nextel's next generation wireless internet service.

=== Decline and initial closure ===
In September 2010, following a months-long carriage dispute, satellite broadcaster DirecTV notified Comcast that it would be dropping the channel upon the expiration of their current deal at the end of the month, though both parties ultimately agreed to a one-month extension in the hopes of reaching a new agreement. On October 28, G4 informed viewers via Attack of the Show! that the channel would be dropped from DirecTV if a new agreement could not be reached by November 1. Attack of the Show! host Kevin Pereira and Web Soup host Chris Hardwick also posted on Twitter urging fans to call a toll-free number in support of the channel. On November 1, 2010, DirecTV removed G4 from its lineup; although Comcast noted that the channel's audience had grown by more than 175% over the past five years, DirecTV cited low interest among their subscriber base as the primary reason for its removal, and Comcast insiders believed the satellite provider did not understand the channel's niche.

On January 18, 2011, Comcast received clearance from the FCC to acquire a controlling stake in NBCUniversal, and the transaction was completed on January 28. In June 2011, the Ultimate Fighting Championship (UFC) entered talks to acquire a controlling stake in G4, potentially valuing the deal at up to $600 million. These negotiations, along with similar overtures from WWE, ultimately fell through. Neal Tiles resigned as G4 President and CEO on January 5, 2012, and was replaced by former NBC marketing chief Adam Stotsky.

In September 2012, G4 was reported to be seeking a rebranding as an upscale men's channel, with sources anticipating a partnership with men's magazines like Esquire or GQ. On October 26, 2012, G4 announced the end of production for its flagship programs X-Play and Attack of the Show!, with a series of farewell episodes airing through the year's end. The cancellations led to the departure of dozens of production staff, and a large number of additional G4 staff were laid off in November 2012, when NBCUniversal eliminated 500 positions across its workforce. In December 2012, NBCUniversal signed a brand licensing deal with the Hearst Corporation, owner of Esquire, to rebrand G4 as the Esquire Channel. In February 2013, it was announced that G4 would rebrand as the Esquire Network on April 22, 2013. Stotsky, who would be working with Esquire editor-in-chief David Granger, described the new channel as targeting "today's modern man", with plans to retain some gaming and technology elements while expanding into food, fashion, travel, humor, competition, and related genres. G4's flagship program American Ninja Warrior would be joined by new unscripted originals (such as the cooking competition Knife Fight and Anthony Bourdain's The Getaway) plus off-network scripted shows including Parks and Recreation and Party Down. The April 22 launch was delayed to summer 2013, reportedly so the network could debut with a stronger slate of originals. In September 2013, NBCUniversal announced that the Esquire Network would instead replace the Style Network, which reached more households and was better situated on cable packages. G4 was reported to be left unchanged "for the forseeable future", though with little prospect of new investment in original programming.

For the entirety of 2013, G4 aired only library and acquired programming, primarily reruns of Lost, X-Play, and American Ninja Warrior as well as the occasional film. In December 2013, Comcast announced that it would cease distribution of G4 beginning January 2014. While the network would gradually lose its carriage, including on Xfinity, NBCUniversal would continue to program the network to exhaust its existing cable operator contracts. On November 16, 2014, NBCUniversal released a statement to the network's remaining carriers announcing its closure on November 30. G4's last program, the first episode of X-Play, aired at 11:30 p.m. ET on December 31, 2014. A note on the G4 website's program schedule was added to that particular episode saying "Thanks for watching G4."

=== Revival and second closure ===
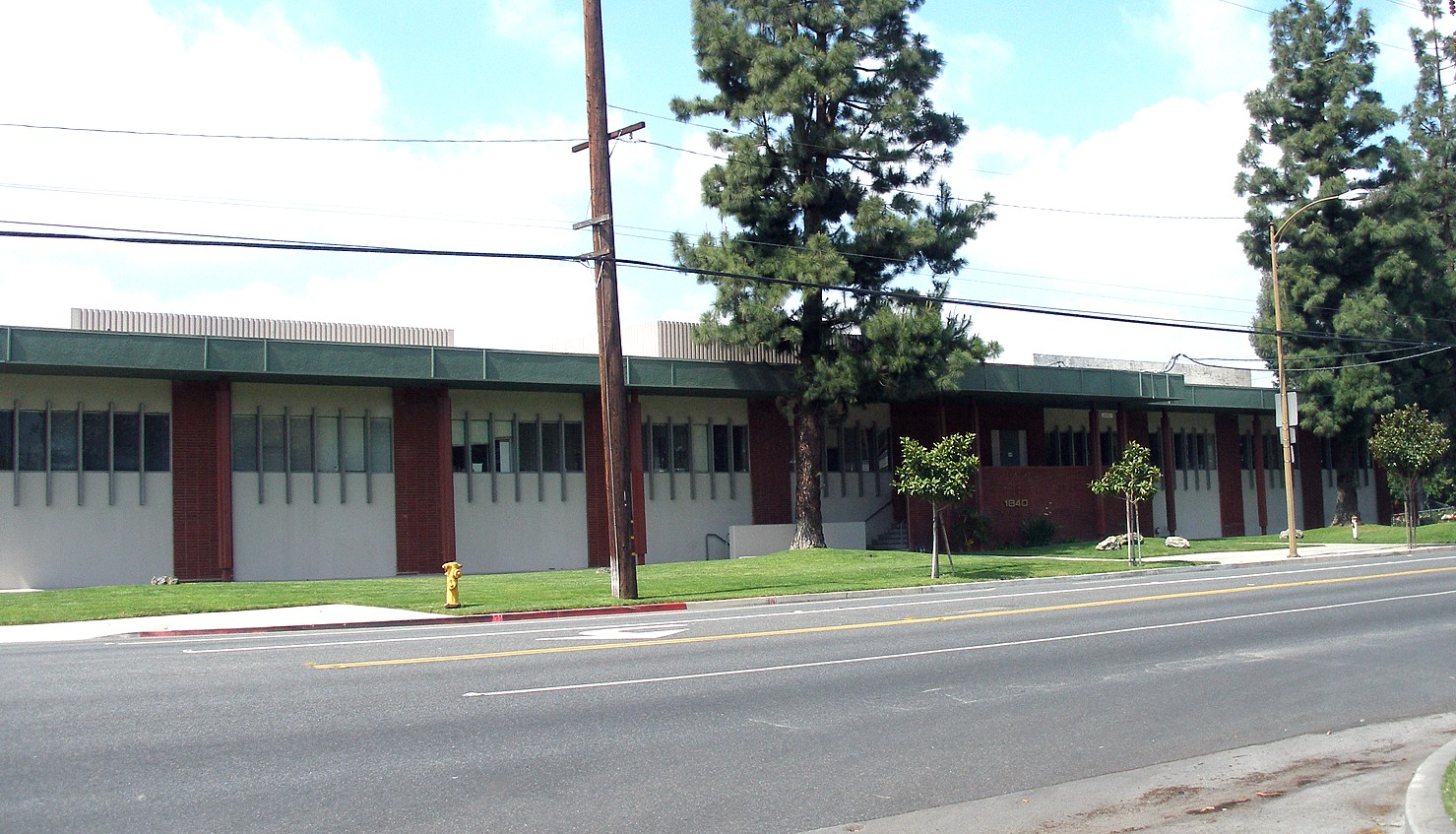
Victory Studios, former home of TMZ and Extra, c. 2007. It was renovated to serve as the home of the G4 revival.

In July 2020, G4 teased a revival of the network, set for a 2021 launch. A Thanksgiving reunion special hosted by Ron Funches and featuring original G4 personalities Kevin Pereira, Olivia Munn, Adam Sessler, Morgan Webb, Kristin Adams, and Blair Herter premiered on November 24. The special featured a cameo from WWE professional wrestler Xavier Woods, who would become a personality on the revived network. G4 confirmed on January 28, 2021, that X-Play and Attack of the Show! would be revived, with Sessler and Pereira confirmed to return as the respective hosts on February 12.

The revived G4 network launched on November 16, 2021, on the linear television lineups of Verizon Fios, Cox, and Xfinity and via streaming on Philo and Twitch. On March 7, 2022, G4 launched the Pluto TV FAST channel G4 Select, which carried most of G4's regular programming. As part of an exclusive partnership, the channel would also feature new content catered to free, linear streaming audiences. The channel was later added to Vizio's WatchFree platform on June 16, 2022. On October 16, 2022, it was announced that G4 would be shutting down after relaunching the previous year. Several factors that led to G4's discontinuation ranged from low viewership, a lack of audience strategy, ever-changing and absent leadership, competition with streaming content creators on YouTube and Twitch, cord-cutting, underpromotion, polarizing segments, and high expenditures.

== Programming ==
The following is a partial list of programs aired by G4.

=== Original programming ===
First run

- American Ninja Warrior – An American adaptation of the Ninja Warrior series originally started as the American Ninja Challenge. Series now airs on NBC.
- Arena – a weekly program in which multiplayer action game teams competed against each other in LAN parties, featuring game highlights, player interviews, and play-by-play commentary.
- Attack of the Show! – a program that covered "the newest tech, the hottest games, the fastest-breaking news, and the oddest oddities from the fringe."
- Blister – a weekly program that provided in-depth coverage of various titles from the action genre, including shooters, driving games, platformers, action-adventure, and horror games.
- The Block – a late-night reality show that followed eight snowboarders who work in the titular Lake Tahoe hotel.
- Bomb Patrol Afghanistan
- Campus PD - A weekly reality show similar in fasion to Cops, following patrol authorities of local police departments or the on-campus police at college and university campuses.
- Cheat! – a weekly program that provided game strategy walkthroughs, tips for overcoming challenging sections, hidden secrets, tricks, and cheat codes.
- Cinematech – a weekly program that showcased cinematics, intro sequences, and trailers from high-end video games.
- Cinematech: Nocturnal Emissions – a late-night version of Cinematech that showcased more risque content than the primetime version.
- Code Monkeys – an animated series with an 8-bit presentation.
- Filter – a weekly video game countdown show that ranked the best or worst in the video game world based on votes from G4 viewers, featuring game clips, viewer e-mail, and man-on-the-street interviews.
- Formula D – a program that covered the Formula Drift Championship Series and showcased the culture surrounding drift racing.
- Free Stuff! – a program in which products were reviewed and given away live.
- G-Phoria – an awards show celebrating the year's games, stars, music and trends.
- G4 Specials – occasional special programs featuring unique and exceptional content from G4, ranging from buyers' guides to coverage of distinctive gaming events.
- G4 Sports – coverage of sporting events including basketball, football, extreme sports, and drift racing.
- G4 Underground – a weekly newsmagazine series that dives into many topics that most major news programs don't cover.
- G4's Late Night Peepshow – a weekly late-night showcase of animated shorts.
- G4tv.com – a weekly interactive talk show that collaborated with the G4 website to facilitate conversation, outspoken opinions, and an uncensored look at what visitors were playing. Viewers influenced show content through polls, ratings, and other interactive tools.
- Game Makers – a program that interviewed game developers and explored the creative process of game design.
- Game On – a hybrid game show, travel show, and reality program that followed co-hosts Matt Gallant and Randy Kagan as they visited video gaming meccas and landmarks across the United States and competed against each other, special guests, and the public in video game-related challenges.
- Happy Tree Friends – a weekly late-night animated series about a group of animals whose adventures always go horribly wrong.
- Happy Tree Friends & Friends – an assortment of animated shorts hosted by the cast of Happy Tree Friends.
- Human Wrecking Balls
- Icons – a documentary series that provided in-depth coverage of the video game industry, featuring behind-the-scenes looks at game developers, profiles of industry giants and notorious figures, and retrospectives on the history of notable games.
- The International Sexy Ladies Show
- It's Effin' Science
- Judgment Day – a weekly program that provided reviews of contemporary video games and hardware across all platforms.
- Jump City: Seattle
- Nerd Nation – a weekly prime-time program that focused on nerd sub-cultures.
- Players – a weekly program that profiled rich, famous, unique, and interesting personalities in the gaming world.
- Portal – a program that explored massively multiplayer online games.
- Proving Ground
- Pulse – a weekly news program that provided headlines and information about video games, the companies, and the people behind them.
- The Screen Savers – a prime-time program that covered the latest computing products and demonstrated their effective use at home and the workplace.
- Spaceballs: The Animated Series – an animated series based on the 1987 film Spaceballs.
- Street Fury – a program hosted by Carlton "Big C" Lewis that explored the culture surrounding import car racing and car modification.
- Sweat – a weekly program that highlighted sports video games, profiled the athletes, designers, and producers involved, and provided behind-the-scenes insights, gameplay tips, and competitive comparisons between different game formats.
- That's Tough
- Training Camp – a program in which gamers were placed in the real-life environment of their favorite sports video games and trained by professional players.
- Two Months. Two Million. – a reality show in which four mathematical geniuses have two months to make two million dollars by playing poker.
- Video Game Vixens – an awards show hosted by Hal Sparks that showcased the "hottest, sexiest and most lethal video game babes".
- Web Soup – a program that showcased viral videos set to commentary.
- Wired for Sex – a weekly late-night program that focused on technology's role in human sexuality.
- X-Play – a weekly program that provided reviews, tips and tricks, and previews for contemporary video games.

Second run

- Attack of the Show
- Boosted
- Crash Course
- Invitation to Party
- Name Your Price
- Ninja Warrior
- Scott the Woz
- Xplay

=== Acquired programming ===
- Action Blast!
  - Battle B-Daman
  - Beast Wars: Transformers
  - Dr. Physics
  - G.I. Joe: A Real American Hero
  - G.I. Joe: Sigma 6
  - Kaiju Big Battel
  - Transformers: Cybertron
- Anime Unleashed
  - Colorful
  - Cromartie High School
  - Gad Guard
  - Gungrave
  - Magical Shopping Arcade Abenobashi
  - RahXephon
  - R.O.D the TV
- Arrested Development
- Banzai
- Brainiac: Science Abuse
- Call for Help
- The Chaser's War on Everything
- Cheaters
- Cops
- Ed the Sock's Night Party
- The Electric Playground
- Fastlane
- Future Fighting Machines
- Heroes
- The Jamie Kennedy Experiment
- Knight Rider
- Lost
- The Man Show
- Marvel Anime
- Ninja Warrior
- Robot Wars
- Star Trek: The Next Generation
- Star Trek: The Original Series
- Starcade
- Totally Outrageous Behavior!
- Trigger Happy TV
- Triumph the Insult Comic Dog
- Unbeatable Banzuke
- Whacked Out Videos

== Staff ==
=== Executives ===
G4's founder and CEO Charles Hirschhorn was the former President of Walt Disney Television and Television Animation. The network's core management team – COO Debra Green, Senior Vice President of Affiliate and Ad Sales Dale Hopkins, and Vice President and Creative Director Julie Fields – were veterans of E!. Senior Vice President of Programming Vinnie Longobardo was originally of MTV. All Games Network founder Scot Rubin was the Vice President of Internet and Program Editorial. The Directors of Program Development were former Sony Computer Entertainment and Sony Imagesoft executive Tina Kowalewski and former Next Generation editor Tom Russo.

=== Hosts and correspondents ===
Kevin Pereira co-hosted Arena, Pulse, The Screen Savers, and Attack of the Show!. Pereira's initial Attack of the Show! co-hosts were Sarah Lane and Brendan Moran, who were also co-hosts on The Screen Savers. Additional The Screen Savers co-hosts included Kevin Rose and Chi-Lan Lieu. Olivia Munn, previously a fashion model and sports reporter, began co-hosting Attack of the Show! with Pereira in 2006. Candace Bailey replaced Munn in January 2011. Correspondents for Attack of the Show! included Blair Butler, Anna David, Chris Gore, Alison Haislip, Chris Hardwick, Blair Herter, and Sara Jean Underwood. Herter and Haislip were also the original co-hosts of American Ninja Warrior; by 2012, they were replaced by Matt Iseman and Jonny Moseley, with Angela Sun as a sideline correspondent.

Adam Sessler served as the co-host of X-Play from its inception as GameSpot TV on ZDTV in 1998 until his departure in 2012. Morgan Webb was introduced as Sessler's co-host when the program was first rebranded as X-Play on TechTV. Following Sessler's departure, Blair Herter co-hosted X-Play with Webb for the remainder of the show's original run. Cheat!, which became a segment of X-Play in 2008, was originally hosted by Cory Rouse, who was replaced by Kristin Adams by 2005.

Arena was originally co-hosted by Wil Wheaton and Travis Oates, who were replaced by Pereira and Lee Reherman by 2005. Filter was originally hosted by Diane Mizota until 2006, when she was replaced by Beth Ostrosky. Former NFL running back Eddie George was the host of Training Camp. G4tv.com was originally co-hosted by Scot Rubin and Tina Wood, with Laura Foy and Geoff Keighley replacing Rubin by 2005. Victor Lucas and Tommy Tallarico served as the co-hosts of Judgment Day. Proving Ground was co-hosted by Ryan Dunn and Jessica Chobot.

Sessler and Pereira returned to respectively co-host Xplay and Attack of the Show! for the revival of G4 in 2021. Sessler was joined by Froskurinn, The Completionist, and The Black Hokage. Other personalities on the revived network included esports players Alex "Goldenboy" Mendez and Ovilee May, WWE professional wrestler Xavier Woods, YouTube personalities Kassem G and Gina Darling, Twitch streamers AustinShow, Fiona Nova, and Will Neff, and vStreamer CodeMiko. Froskurinn departed in September 2022 shortly after a round of layoffs at G4.
