= List of technology podcasts =

This is a list of technology podcasts.

== List ==
Podcast	Years	Host(s)	Produced by	Ref
MacBreak	2006–2011	Leo Laporte, Merlin Mann, Alex Lindsay, iJustine, Kendra Arimoto and Emery Wells	TWiT.tv	
Tips from the Top Floor	2005–2023	Chris Marquardt	Photocast Network	
RadioTux	2005–present	Ingo Ebel, Leszek Lesner, Sebastian Meyer, Patrick Middelhoff, Robert Friemer, and Sebastian Preisner	Independent	
LugRadio				
Buzz Out Loud				
This Week in Tech				
How I Built This				
Diggnation				
Security Now				
FLOSS Weekly				
Linux Outlaws				
Search Engine				
Ubuntu Podcast				
Stuff You Should Know				
Film Sack				
TED Radio Hour				
Linux Voice				
Reply All				
Note to Self				
How Did This Get Played?				
Radiolab				
Same Brain				
50 Things That Made the Modern Economy				
Darknet Diaries				
Waveform				
Dr. Kiki's Science Hour	2009–2012	Kiki Sanford	TWIT.tv	
Endless Thread	2017–present	Ben Brock Johnson and Amory Sivertson	WBUR	
QAnon Anonymous				
Daily Tech News Show				
The Tech Guy	2004–present	Leo Laporte	TWiT.tv	
Spark				
Tekzilla				
Titans of Nuclear	2018–present	Bret Kugelmass	Energy Impact Center	
IRL: Online Life Is Real Life				
Recode Decode				
Twenty Thousand Hertz				
Technology Now	2023- -present		Hewlett Packard Eneterprise	
The Dwarkesh Podcast	2020- -present	Dwarkesh Patel		
The freeCodeCamp Podcast	2017–present	Quincy Larson	freeCodeCamp	
