= Natali Morris =

American media personality

Natali Terese Morris
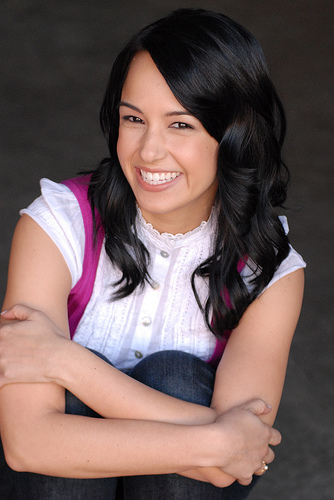
- Morris in 2008
- Born: Natali Terese Del Conte; 1978 (age 47–48); San Leandro, California, U.S.
- Occupations: Journalist, online media personality/podcaster
- Spouse: Clayton Morris (m. 2010)
- Children: 3
- Website: Official website

Natali Terese Morris (née Del Conte; born 1978) is an American online media personality and co-founder of Morris Invest, a real estate investment company. She was formerly a technology news journalist with CNET and CBS. Prior to joining CNET, she wrote, produced, and hosted a show "TeXtra" on Podshow.

== Education ==
Morris graduated from Mission San Jose High School in Fremont, California in 1996 and went on to receive her BA in Mass Communication with an emphasis in Journalism from California State University, East Bay in 2000.

== Career ==
Her first journalism job out of college was as a staff writer for the Features section of the Oakland Tribune. She stayed there a year before leaving for graduate school in 2001. After graduate school, Morris took a year sabbatical and taught yoga at Canyon Ranch SpaClub at The Venetian in Las Vegas, Nevada. When she returned to the Bay Area, she did a short stint in public relations for SHIFT Communications where she represented enterprise technology companies. Morris left SHIFT Communications in order to return to journalism in 2005. She began freelancing for MarketWatch, Variety, The Oakland Tribune, and Hispanic Magazine.

In 2006, Morris joined the news desk at PC Magazine. While working for PC Magazine, Morris began making appearances on Cranky Geeks, which launched her video career quite unexpectedly. Her new show, Loaded started in February 2008 with coverage from CES 2008.

In addition to her duties at CNET, Morris freelances for Wired, PC Magazine, AppScout, Aware Magazine, and ELLEgirl. She makes regular appearances on The CBS Early Show, and Red Eye (prior to her CBS exclusivity agreement).

In 2010, Morris and three friends started the motherhood weblog, MommyBeta The blog was nominated in The Bump's 2010 Mommy Blog Awards for Best Baby Journal Blog.

On November 23, 2010, Morris began to host wrestling promotion Chikara new video segment, The Throwdown Lowdown. Morris left CNET on Friday, April 29, 2011. On February 1, 2012, Morris announced Disney Cruise Line would be releasing videos featuring her as the host.

== Personal life ==
On October 21, 2010 on CNET's "The 404" podcast she announced she married Fox News Channel host Clayton Morris in an October 2010 lunchtime ceremony at New York City Hall, and would take the last name Morris both professionally and personally as of mid-November 2010. In 2010 she gave birth to the couple's first child. In 2012 she gave birth to the couple's second child. The family moved from New Jersey to Portugal in 2019. Morris and her husband had initially relocated to Pennsylvania before leaving the country all together. According to Morris, they moved to the country on temporary visas to allow their children to attend schools overseas.

== Guest appearances ==
- March 29, 2007: On G4TV's Attack of the Show!, Morris talked about how she is not a fan of the whole Twitter concept.
- April 10, 2007: Marketplace Public Radio interviews Morris about the art of cyber phishing and identity theft.
- April 14, 2007: Today show host Matt Lauer interviews Morris about saving money with on-line purchases through the use of web based coupon codes.
- April 18, 2007: Today show host Matt Lauer interviews Morris about how to save time using the Internet.
- April 18, 2007: Morris joined the boys of CNET's 404 podcast to talk about Jeff Bakalar's visit to see Shigeru Miyamoto, Juno, and movies coming up that weekend.
- April 18, 2007: GeekBrief.TV's Cali Lewis interviews Morris about her new gig as Senior Editor for CNET TV and her new show Loaded. They also talk about her transition from print journalism to video, and her famous Flickr photos of food.
- April 25, 2007: Appears in a CNBC interview about free online gaming with Billy Pidgeon of IDC.
- May 7, 2007: Along with The Naked Trucker and T-Bones Show members, Morris discusses BitTorrent's new deals with Hollywood, and her deals with the pod-o-sphere. She also talks about how she started the podcast and what she wants out of being with PodShow.
- January 10, 2008: On G4TV's Best of CES 2008, Morris joined the G4 crew to talk about some of the best gadgets seen at CES this year.
- February 20, 2008: Morris discusses the future of the growing video game industry on CNBC.
- March 29, 2008: On Fox News, Morris discusses the best way to get a Nintendo Wii.
- April 2, 2008: On Revision3's show Internet Superstar, Morris is interviewed regarding her work at CNET TV.
- August 5, 2008 : Morris was a guest on the Fox News program Red Eye w/ Greg Gutfeld.
- March 17, 2009 : On The Early Show, Natali Morris showed Chris Wragge the Dell Adamo and iPod Shuffle.
- December 25 and 31, 2009: Morris served as a fill-in anchor on WCBS news broadcasts.
- January 8, 2010: On The Early Show, Natali Morris showed of tech his and her gifts for Valentine's Day.
- January 10, 2010: On The Early Show Morris YouTube's new safety control features that prevent children from seeing dangerous content.
- April 25, 2010: On This Week in Tech (TWiT) episode 245 as a guest with Becky Worley, and Shira Lazar.
- December 19, 2010: On This Week in Tech (TWiT) episode 279 as a guest with Jim Louderback and Marshall Kirkpatrick of "ReadWriteWeb".
- May 1, 2011: On This Week in Tech (TWiT) episode 299 as a guest with Alex Lindsay, Wil Harris and Clayton Morris.
- September 1, 2011: On iPad Today (TWiT) episode 61 - Natali Morris and Apps for Parents as a guest with Sarah Lane.
- February 17, 2013: On This Week in Tech (TWiT) episode 393 as a guest with Jason Hiner, John C. Dvorak and Ryan Shrout.
- May 26, 2013: On This Week in Tech (TWiT) episode 407 as a guest with Larry Magid and Jeff Gerstmann.
- January 12, 2014: On This Week in Tech (TWiT) episode 440 as a guest with Marques Brownlee and John C. Dvorak.
- June 30, 2014: On Marketing Mavericks (TWiT) episode 13 as a guest with Frank Eliason and Steve Faktor.
