= Chris DiBona =

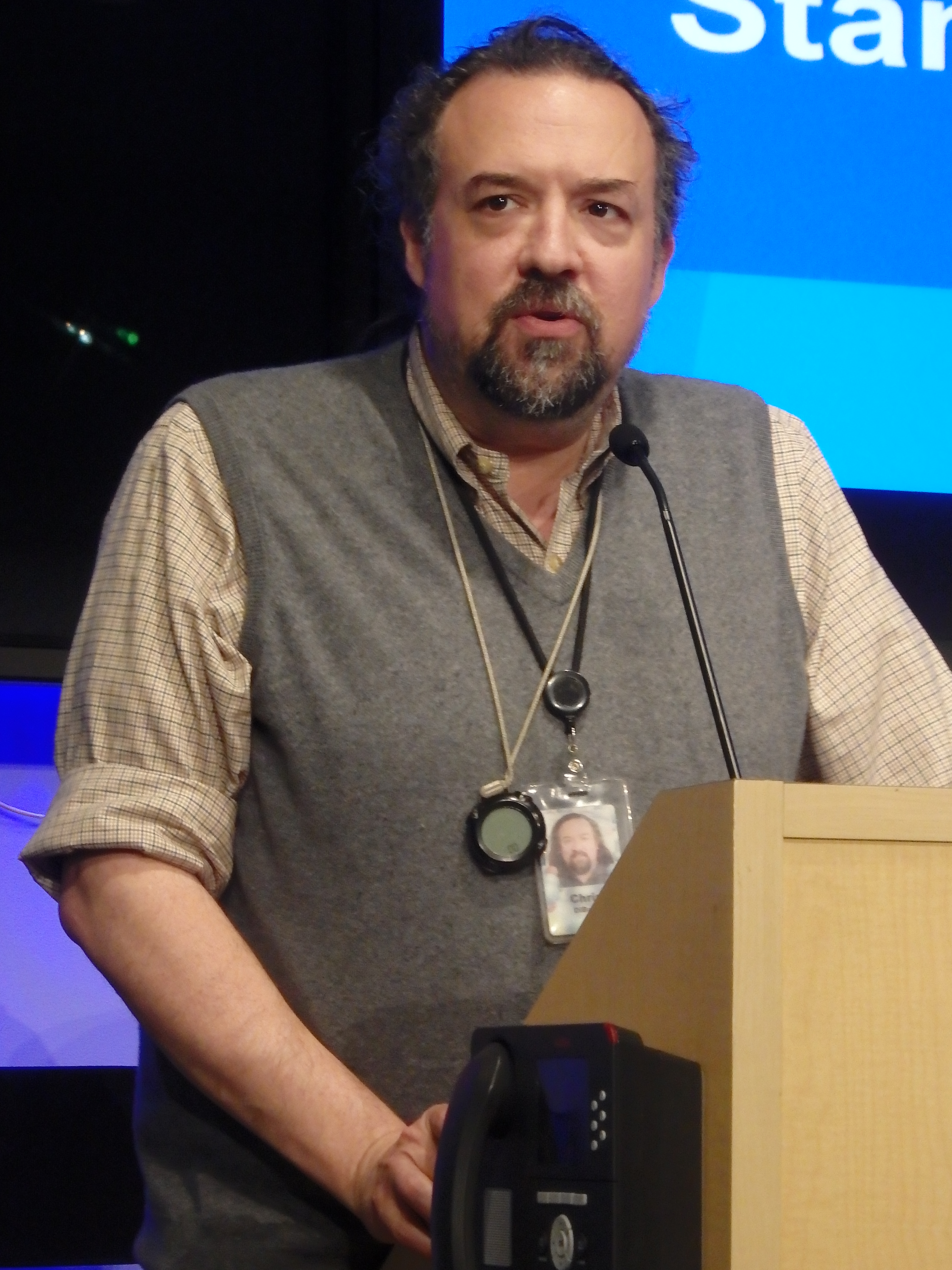
- Born: October 1971 (age 54)
- Other name: cdibona

Chris DiBona ('cdibona', born October 1971) works in the office of the CTO at Microsoft having previously served as director of open source at Google from August 2004 until January 2023.

Before joining Google, he was an editor at Slashdot and co-founded Damage Studios. DiBona has a B.S. in computer science from George Mason University and a M.S. in software engineering from Carnegie Mellon University. He also co-edited Open Sources: Voices from the Open Source Revolution and Open Sources 2.0.

He was laid off from Google in January 2023 as part of Alphabet's workforce reductions.

== FLOSS Weekly ==
He formerly co-hosted FLOSS Weekly (a podcast that was spun off from the popular This Week in Tech) with Leo Laporte. The show premiered on April 7, 2006, and features prominent guests from the free software/open source community. He also appeared on This Week in Tech and CrankyGeeks from time to time and was in the documentary Revolution OS. On July 29, 2007, Laporte announced that due to commitment issues, DiBona was stepping down as host of FLOSS Weekly.

== Science Foo Camp ==
DiBona runs Science Foo Camp annually with Tim O'Reilly of O'Reilly Media and Timo Hannay of Nature on the Google campus in Mountain View, California.

== TechTV ==
DiBona was a Linux commentator on TechTV's The Screen Savers, during 2004 and parts of 2005. His stories concentrated on fun applications and consumer use of Linux.

== Other activities ==
DiBona formerly served on the board of Our Good Works, a non-profit that looks after the volunteer matching website Allforgood.org. He serves on the board of the Linux Foundation. DiBona served on the advisory board of imeem, a San Francisco, California–based social networking firm, and advises PicPlz, a San Francisco start-up. He's a visiting scientist (formally a visiting scholar) at the MIT Sloan School of Management, and an advisor to Mixed Media Labs, app.net project. He also advises Ingenuitas on their sight machine project. He's also an associate in Google Ventures.
