= Mary Jo Foley =

American freelance technology writer, author, podcaster, and editor

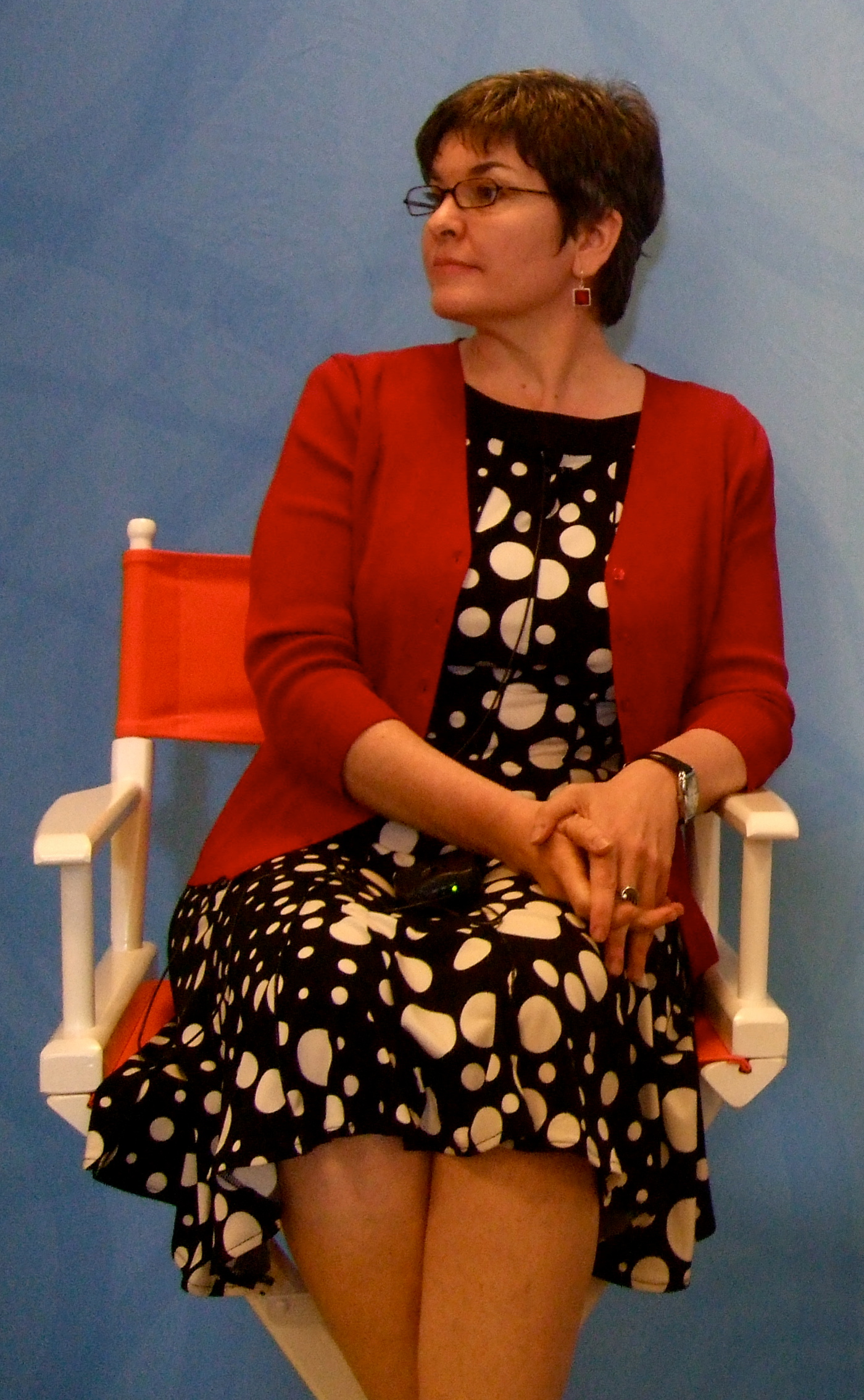
- Foley in 2008
- Born: November 15, 1961 (age 64); Framingham, Massachusetts, U.S.
- Education: Simmons College
- Occupations: Technology writer, Author, Podcaster, editor
- Known for: Editor of "All About Microsoft" column on ZDNet
- Notable work: She edited the award-winning "At The Evil Empire" column for ZDNet.; Foley used to be a co-host on a weekly podcast with Leo Laporte and Paul Thurrott, called "Windows Weekly"
- Website: https://www.directionsonmicrosoft.com/blog

Mary Jo Foley is an American freelance technology writer, author, podcaster and news editor. She regularly writes news, previews, and reviews for Microsoft's strategy, products and technology. Foley has been covering news on Microsoft Windows, and previously on Unix-related technology, since 1983, for publications including ZDNet, eWeek, Baseline, Redmond magazine, PC Magazine, and Directions on Microsoft.

== Career ==
Foley graduated from Simmons College in 1983 with a degree in technical journalism. In 1984 she interviewed the then head of Microsoft, Bill Gates, for a cover story in Electronic Business magazine. The interview was held at the Microsoft booth of the annual COMDEX technology exhibition. During the interview, Apple Computer CEO Steve Jobs, whom Foley did not know, walked up and began chatting with Gates. Eventually Foley grew impatient and told Jobs that she was trying to do an interview, and asked him to come back later. Jobs walked away, and Gates then explained to Foley that she had just sent away the head of Apple. In 1991 she was hired by the magazine PCWeek, later renamed to eWeek, and moved to San Francisco. In 1993 she was offered the newly vacant post of Microsoft reporter, and moved to Seattle, Washington, near Microsoft's Redmond, Washington, headquarters. In the late 1990s, she edited the award-winning "At The Evil Empire" column for ZDNet, and subsequently the "Microsoft Watch" blog for Ziff Davis. Until October 2022, she edited the "All About Microsoft" column on ZDNet.

Three days before the public launch on February 17, 2000, of the full version of Microsoft Windows 2000, which Microsoft advertised as "a standard in reliability," a leaked memo from Microsoft reported on by Foley revealed that Windows 2000 had "over 63,000 potential known defects." After Foley's article was published, she claimed that Microsoft blacklisted her for a considerable time.

From July 7, 2007, to October 26, 2022, Foley co-hosted a weekly podcast with Leo Laporte and Paul Thurrott, called "Windows Weekly", covering news on Microsoft, its products and services, and other computing-related topics. Foley mainly focused on Microsoft's enterprise business. On October 26, 2022, she announced that she was leaving the show, as well as ZDNet to become editor-in-chief at Directions on Microsoft.

Foley has interviewed prominent figures in information technology, including Bill Gates, Steve Jobs, Steve Ballmer and Satya Nadella.

== Books ==
- Microsoft 2.0: How Microsoft Plans to Stay Relevant in the Post-Gates Era, Wiley & Sons, May 2008. ISBN 978-0470191385
