= Open Sources 2.0 =

2005 anthology of essays

- Editor: Chris DiBona, Mark Stone and Danese Cooper
- Publisher: O'Reilly Media
- Publication date: October 2005

Open Sources 2.0 is a book published by O'Reilly Media. Following on the popularity of Open Sources: Voices from the Open Source Revolution, it is a second anthology of essays written by luminaries of the open source and free software movements. The essays explore open source's impact on the software industry and reveal how open-source concepts are infiltrating other areas of commerce and society.

The book was edited by Chris DiBona, Mark Stone and Danese Cooper. The essays contained were written by Alolita Sharma, Andrew Hessel, Ben Laurie, Boon-Lock Yeo, Bruno Souza, Chris DiBona, Danese Cooper, Doc Searls, Eugene Eric Kim, Gregorio Robles, Ian Murdock, Jeff Bates, Jeremy Allison, Jesus M. Gonzalez-Barahona, Kim Polese, Larry Sanger, Louisa Liu, Mark Stone, Matthew N. Asay, Michael Olson, Mitchell Baker, Pamela Jones, Robert Adkins, Russ Nelson, Sonali K. Shah, Stephen R. Walli, Steven Weber, Sunil Saxena, Tim O'Reilly, and Wendy Seltzer.

The first edition was published in October 2005.

The book was published under the Creative Commons CC BY-NC-ND 2.5 license.
