= Robert Ballecer =

American technology commentator

The Reverend Robert Ballecer SJ
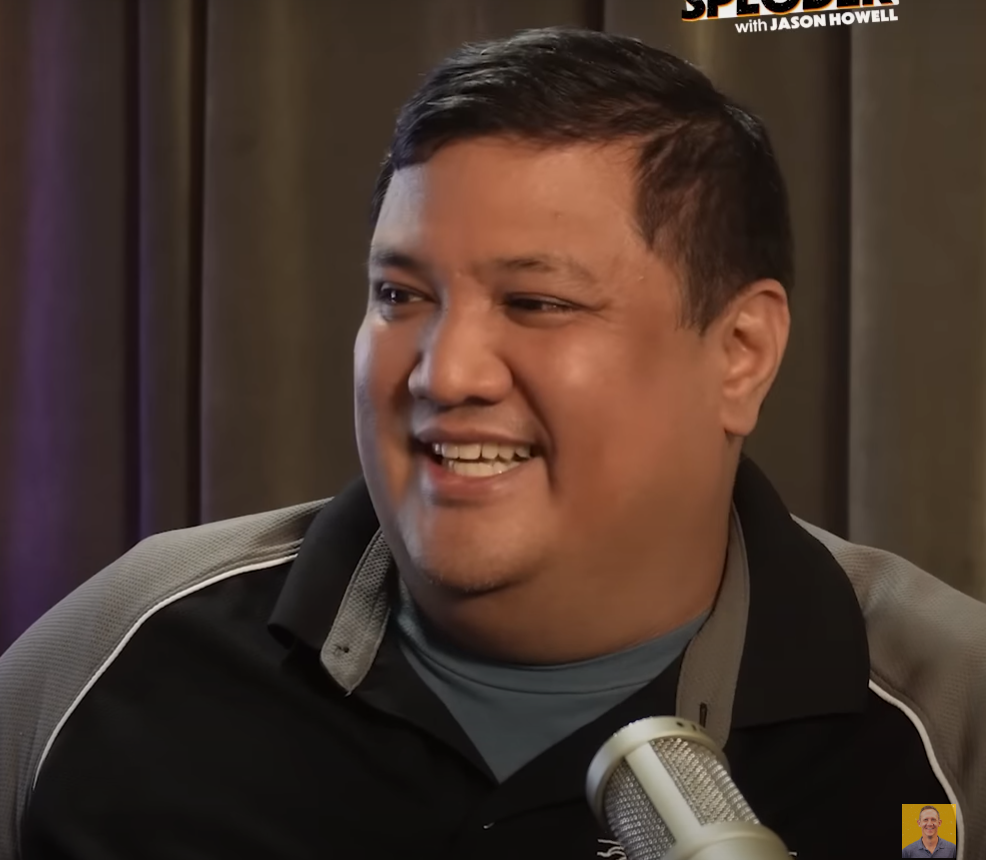
- Ballecer in 2024
- Church: Catholic Church

Personal details
- Born: 28 May 1974 (age 52) Hayward, California, US
- Occupation: Priest; podcaster
- Education: Bellarmine College Preparatory; Santa Clara University

Robert R. Ballecer (born May 28, 1974), also known as the Digital Jesuit or by his social media handle PadreSJ, is an American Jesuit priest and tech podcaster. He formerly hosted This Week in Enterprise Tech and Know How... on the TWiT.tv network.

== Early life ==
Ballecer was born on May 29, 1974, in Hayward, California, and grew up in Fremont, California. His parents emigrated to the United States in 1970, and he grew up in a traditional Filipino household. He salvaged discarded computer parts and built his own computer. In the 1980s, he ran an online bulletin board system. He started working for R&A Professional Consultants in 1988.

== Education ==
Ballecer studied at Bellarmine College Preparatory and Santa Clara University, where he majored in computer engineering, and also became interested in becoming a Catholic priest. He joined the Jesuits in 1994 and ran a computer server to put the order's California Province online. He studied philosophy at Loyola University Chicago and then taught computer programming at Loyola High School in Los Angeles. He studied theology at the Jesuit School of Theology of Santa Clara University.

== Career ==
Ballecer helped the Jesuits set up their own email addresses and started websites for Jesuit high schools. He served at the Most Holy Trinity Catholic Church in San Jose, and was named director of the Center for Apostolic Technology.

He became a fan of the TechTV show The Screen Savers, which ran in the late 1990s and 2000s. He started blogging for "The Tech Stop" in 2001. Leo Laporte found Ballecer in TWiT's chat room in 2010. Laporte asked the chat room who could host show on enterprise technology, and the chat room suggested "PadreSJ", the chat handle for Robert Ballecer, could host this show. Ballecer started hosting the show This Week in Enterprise Tech, anchoring live events, and hosting the do-it-yourself show Know How.... He has also appeared as a guest on other TWiT.tv shows, and hosted Coding 101 and Padre's Corner.

As a priest, he oversaw efforts to encourage young men to pursue the priesthood. For four years starting in 2009, he worked for the Jesuit Conference as the National Director of Vocation Promotion in Washington, DC. He also produced a series of short films titled Jesuits Revealed to improve the Jesuits' online image.

Ballecer lived in St. Ignatius College Preparatory in San Francisco in 2016 and still resides there when he is in the US.
