= Megan Morrone =

American actress, podcaster & writer (born 1973)

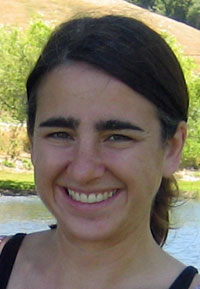
- Born: Megan Wells Olesky; March 15, 1973 (age 52)
- Education: Johns Hopkins University
- Occupations: Journalist; podcaster; broadcaster
- Employer: TWiT (2006-2019)
- Known for: The Screen Savers; Tech News Weekly, Jumping Monkeys; iOS Today; The New Screen Savers
- Website: meganmorrone.com

Megan Morrone (born Megan Wells Olesky on March 15, 1973) is an American actress, technology podcaster and writer. She was the co-host of TWiT online programs Tech News Weekly, iOS Today, and Triangulation, and former host of Tech News Today, Tech News 2Night, iFive for the iPhone, Inside The Net, and Jumping Monkeys.

== Career ==
Morrone was on-air talent, a producer, and a web producer for Tech TV, appearing on technology-related television show The Screen Savers until 2003. Reportedly, Morrone quit The Screen Savers to raise a family and write for one of Microsoft's consumer websites. She made occasional guest appearances after departing.

With Microsoft, Morrone was a writer and editor for 11 years, developing and writing for Microsoft Safety and Security Center, writing for the Security Tips & Talk blog, writing for one newsletter, and managing content for another.

She previously ran the Jumping Monkeys website devoted to her three children and to child-raising issues. She announced in February 2009 that the podcast, at one point on hiatus, would not be returning.

Following the 2004 merger of G4 and TechTV, Screen Savers host Leo Laporte created a podcast and video network called TWiT.tv. Morrone guest co-hosted Inside the Net in late 2006. From 2007 to 2008, Morrone co-hosted the Jumping Monkeys: Parenting in the Digital Age program with Laporte.

She returned to TWiT in 2015, hosting the final year of both iFive for the iPhone and Tech News 2Night, co-hosting iOS Today with Leo Laporte (2015 on), and co-hosting a relaunched Tech News Today with Jason Howell, starting in 2016. The program was reformatted in October 2017 as Tech News Weekly.

On June 28, 2019 Morrone announced she was leaving TWiT to pursue other opportunities. She worked for Medium until 2021 when she announced she would be joining Protocol, a news website owned by Capitol News Company.

== Personal life ==
Morrone earned a BA from Johns Hopkins University in Baltimore, Maryland. She currently lives in Northern California with her husband, Marco, and their three children, Annabella, Milo, and Huck.
