= The Tech Guy =

Technology radio program

- TWiT logo for The Tech Guy
- Genre: Talk, Call In
- Running time: 3 hours (with ad breaks)
- Country of origin: United States
- Language: English
- Home station: KFI AM 640
- Syndicates: List of Affiliates
- Hosted by: Leo Laporte
- Starring: Leo Laporte
- Recording studio: Petaluma, California
- Original release: January 3, 2004 – December 18, 2022
- No. of episodes: 1822 (As of 22 August 2021)
- Audio format: Mono
- Website: TWiT.tv; Tech Guy Labs
- Podcast: RSS Feed

The Tech Guy was a widely syndicated US radio show hosted by Leo Laporte, formerly of TechTV and later with TWiT.tv. The show, which was first exclusively broadcast on KFI 640 AM in Los Angeles, was picked up for syndication by Premiere Networks (then Premiere Radio Networks) in February 2007. Laporte streamed video of his side of the show on TWiT Live, including caller audio. The show was available live on Saturdays and Sundays at 11:00 a.m. Pacific Time.

The show had over 160 affiliates in radio markets including Los Angeles, San Diego, Houston, Phoenix and Denver. It reportedly reached 500,000 people through its affiliates. That placed it second behind The Kim Komando Show (with 2.25 million weekly listeners) in the syndicated tech radio field.

The show was a mixture of interviews and call-ins, as well as Laporte's own thoughts and opinions on current events in technology. Several regular guests would appear during the show via Zoom: AVSForum editor Scott Wilkinson, Dick DeBartolo of Mad Magazine, and Johnny Jet appeared on Saturdays while Chris Marquardt of Tips from the Top Floor has a Sunday segment. Former guests included Steve Gibson, Paul Thurrott, and Ron Rosberg. The show originated from the TWiT Eastside studios in Petaluma, California, a community north of San Francisco. The Tech Guy concluded in December 2022, with Rich DeMuro taking the time slot with his own program Rich on Tech.

== History ==
Leo Laporte has been doing one version or another of his technology talk show since 1990, including a syndicated show originating from KGO. "The Tech Show" began on KFI weekends in 2004, only months prior to the cancellation of Call for Help and The Screen Savers from the newly merged G4techTV in the United States. According to Leo, he had to find a way to keep talking about technology, and facetiously mentioned that if it wasn't for KFI green lighting the show, he would have ended up "having to talk to [his] wife about it." The show ran weekends on KFI at 11 AM. Leo also appeared on Bill Handel's morning show on Fridays for The Laporte Report segment. Leo also does a Laporte Report live segment for CFRB in Toronto, Ontario on Saturday mornings.

In late 2006, Leo notified his audience on net@nite that his contract with KFI was going to expire soon, and it was hinted at that he would only continue with Clear Channel if "The Tech Guy" was syndicated. With the help of management at KFI, Premiere Networks picked up the show for syndication, and it was announced on January 27, 2007, that it would roll out nationally. On February 17, 2007, the newly syndicated "The Tech Guy" radio show launched nationally on eleven radio stations, including KFI. The show grew sharply from the original twelve to over one hundred by the summer of 2011. The show later grew to be syndicated on over two hundred stations by 2021. Laporte retired from "The Tech Guy" on December 18, 2022. He and frequent cohost Mikah Sargent began "Ask the Tech Guys" podcast on January 8, 2023.

== Live chat ==
A public Internet Relay Chat ran while the show aired live on the server irc.twit.tv in the #twitlive channel. Leo participated in the chat during commercial breaks and often referred to the chat to give him additional information to assist with some of the callers' questions. The channel was moderated to keep the chat clean and on-topic.

== Podcast ==
Every show is available as a podcast on the TWiT network, distributed via RSS feed. Until June 2011, shows were posted intermittently up to a week after their first airdate in order to meet the requirements of Laporte's Premiere contract for exclusivity purposes for the radio affiliates, and the live and taped video versions of the show required caller audio to be muted.

After Laporte renewed his Premiere deal that month, these conditions were relaxed, and the show was allowed to be posted hours after first broadcast to TWiT, and caller audio could be heard on the live video and TWiT.am audio feeds. The new deal also allowed Laporte to solicit his traditional TWiT advertisers to sponsor the podcast feeds, while retaining his advertisers for the radio version.

At the end of 2015, "The Tech Guy" was number 10 on the Top 40 US Technology Podcasts, making it the third highest weekly TWiT.tv podcast.

The podcast was included on Education Technology Magazine's list of "6 Essential Podcasts for Tech Heads to Tune Into".

The podcast was included on Sound & Vision Magazine's list of the "Best of 2010" on iTunes.

== Technical details ==
The show was produced from Leo Laporte's "TWiT Cottage" at 8 Keller St. but moved to the new TWiT studio known as the TWiT Brick House at 140 Keller St. in late July 2011. It streamed to Premiere Networks via ISDN to Premiere at 64 kbit/s. From there Premiere uplinked it to their satellite network for distribution. Leo also streamed the show on the TWiT Live website.

The July 24, 2011, show was the last program produced at the TWiT Cottage, with Laporte parading through downtown Petaluma after the end of that day's show to the Brick House with his staff and onlookers to inaugurate the new facility, which opened an hour later with that week's This Week in Tech. The first The Tech Guy show produced at the TWiT Brick House was on July 30, which also was the first broadcast from Leo's office set, which was built to resemble the former Cottage studio.

== Radio affiliates ==
"The Tech Guy" radio show was syndicated to several affiliates across America, including the show's flagship, KFI in Los Angeles, California. While formerly on KGO-AM in San Francisco, California—the metropolitan area nearest TWiT's studios—it was tape-delayed Sundays on KKSF-AM.

The show ran live for three hours each Saturday and Sunday at 11 a.m. Pacific, 2 p.m. Eastern, with some stations delaying their airing until later in the day. Some affiliates picked up both shows each weekend, while others chose to run one.

== Rich On Tech ==
After Laporte's retirement in December 2022, Rich DeMuro, Laporte's frequent fill-in host and technology reporter for KTLA-Channel 5 in Los Angeles, took over the program on January 7, 2023, as "Rich On Tech."
