= Kate Botello =

American actor, playwright and radio/television personality

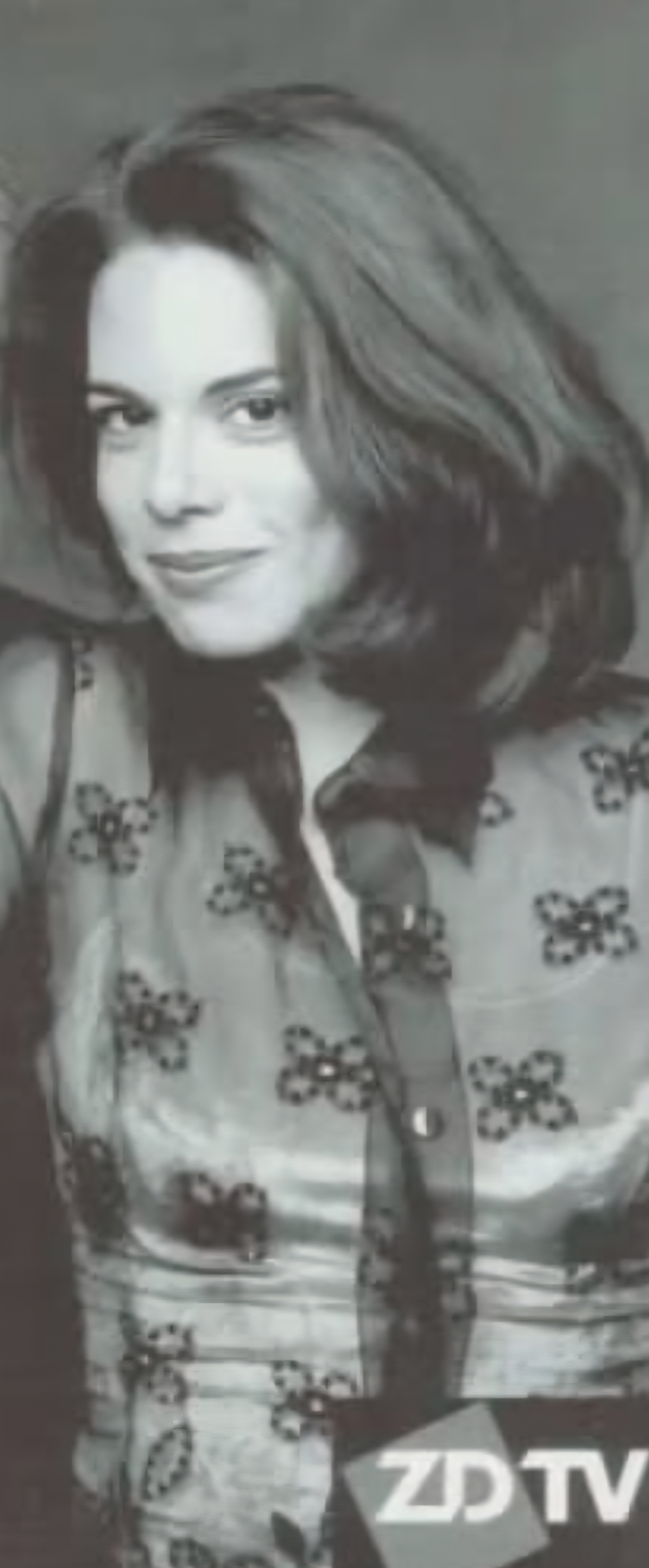
Kate Botello during her stint on ZDTV

Kate Botello is a former American television personality best known for her work on the San Francisco, California-based ZDTV (later known as TechTV and then as G4).

== Career ==
Botello was born in Dallas, Texas and raised in Santa Fe, New Mexico. She graduated high school in Mendocino, California and studied theater in San Francisco State University. Following a series of temp jobs, she joined Ziff Davis as a tech support staffer. Botello's Judy Garland impression while installing a printer caught the attention of Leo Laporte, who offered her a co-hosting position on the technology-oriented television program The Screen Savers. In 1999, Botello and Laporte were described as "the two most popular personalities on the only 24-hour national cable channel devoted exclusively to computers and the Internet". When the pair appeared at a promotional event in York, Pennsylvania that year: "Geeks swarmed the local electronics store where Kate Botello and Leo Laporte were signing autographs. Security had to be called to help guide the two computer advice experts to their car."

In 2000, Botello left The Screen Savers to co-host GameSpot TV, a video game review show, with Adam Sessler. In February 2001, the show was renamed Extended Play. She also co-hosted a TechTV video on computer basics with Chris Pirillo.

Botello left TechTV in 2002 and moved to Brooklyn, New York where she worked on Broadway as a freelance actor, singer and playwright. In her time there, she starred Off-Broadway as Judy Garland in the cabaret musical, Judy Garland and the Uninvited Company and the annual holiday musical, Judy's Christmas Garland. The cabaret show later toured other cities. A critic wrote that "Botello nails Garland's familiar speaking voice, singing voice and facial expressions".

In November 2005, Botello moved to Traverse City, Michigan where she co-founded Traverse City Web Design.

In June 2011, Botello began hosting Weird News Radio, a weekly audio podcast, with Jim Harold. She was also on the air from 7 to 10 am Eastern on "Classical IPR", part of Interlochen Public Radio, WIAA (FM), Interlochen, Michigan. Her programming on Classical IPR included "Showtunes with Kate Botello" airing on Sunday evenings at 7 pm EST, "Kids Commute" airing weekdays at 7:40am and 3:20pm, and the podcast of "Classical Sprouts" Botello ended her stint at Interlochen Public Radio in October 2024.
