= Linux Outlaws =

Technology podcast about Linux

- Genre: Talk show (Linux, Free and open source software)
- Language: English

Cast and voices
- Hosted by: Fabian Scherschel and Dan Lynch

Technical specifications
- Audio format: Ogg Vorbis, MP3

Publication
- Original release: 5 September 2007 – 29 December 2014; 11 years ago
- Updates: Varies (Recording on Monday, for release ~7 days later)

Linux Outlaws was a Linux news and technology podcast produced by Sixgun Productions and hosted by Fabian Scherschel and Dan Lynch. The show was based in the United Kingdom, and had a community forum as well as multiple social network accounts dedicated to fostering inter-communication among fans.

== Presenters ==
=== Fabian Scherschel ===
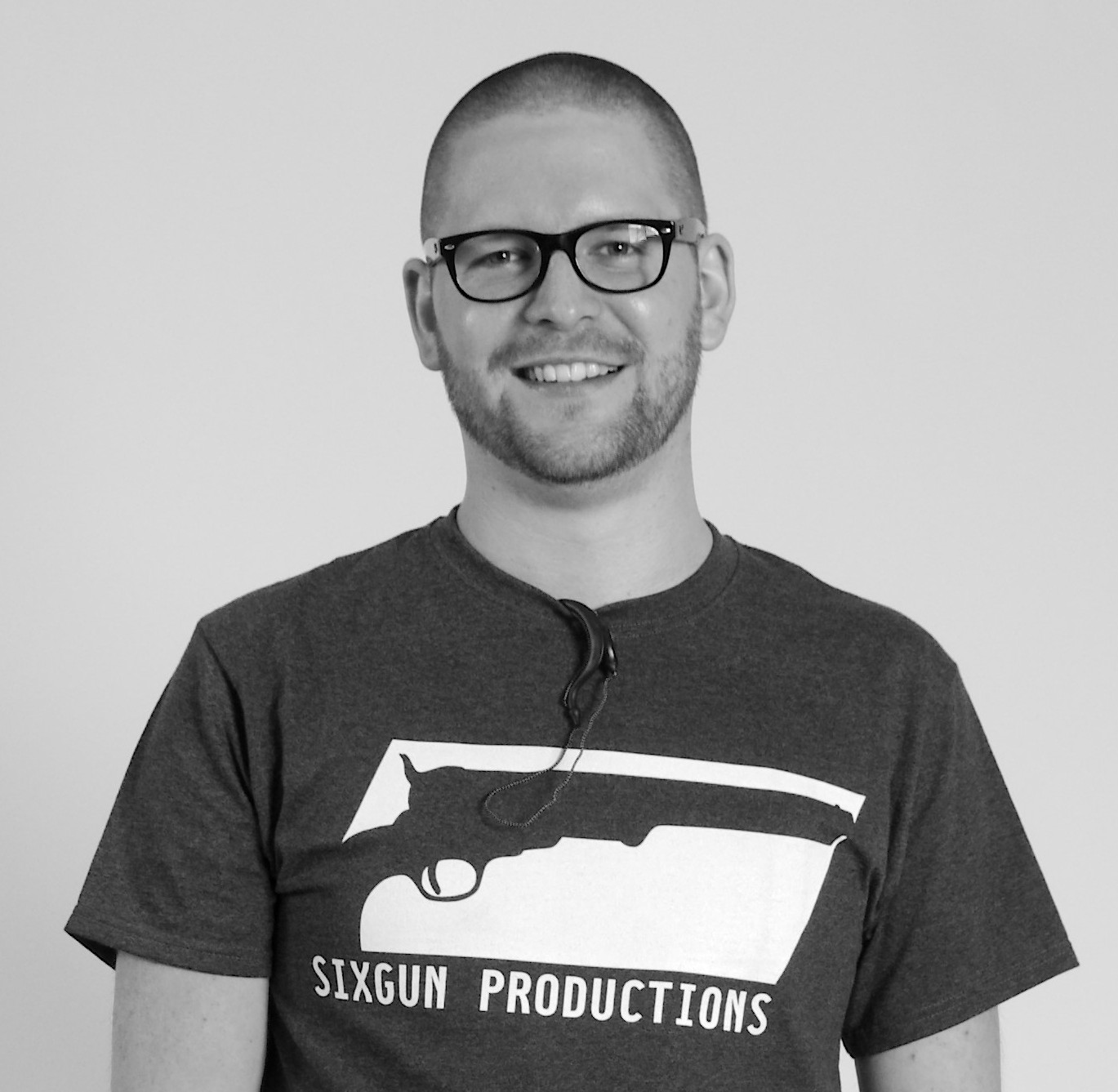
Linux Outlaw Host: Fabian Scherschel

Fabian Scherschel is a journalist at Heise Verlag in Hannover, Germany. He originally was a system administrator in Bonn. Later on he worked for a while for H-online in London. Fab also co-hosts a Warhammer 40,000 podcast, Angels of Death, with David Megins-Nicholas. Since December 2015 Fabian has been co-hosting Geek News Radio with David.

=== Dan Lynch ===
Dan Lynch is a programmer, musician, and producer from Merseyside, UK. He formerly worked for the NHS as a .NET developer before turning his back on Microsoft technologies to become an open source enthusiast.

Dan is an occasional co-host of FLOSS Weekly. In early 2010 Dan formed the band 20lb Sounds. He also produces the Free as in Freedom podcast

== Format ==
Each episode generally had a global download count of over 20000 and was often presented with both a serious attitude and a humorous bent. Both Dan and Fabian are described as "down to earth, normal, everyday people" by listeners and reviewers alike. The presenters claimed not to be Linux experts, but only to be trying very hard to provide listeners with a good time, entertainment, and interesting Linux-related information.

Linux Outlaws was segment-based, and focused the show on discussion of various topics throughout the show. Regular features included News and Releases, a look at recent development in free culture and at new releases of Linux distributions and notable pieces of free software. Episode 43 saw the introduction of a Micro-watch sub-segment, concentrating on Microsoft-related news. The Linux Outlaws show aimed to broadcast live on YouTube most Monday nights (7 p.m. UTC), but they were always late.

In-Depth Topics and Listener Feedback included content from both presenters and listeners. Other segments included Tip of the Week and Beer of the Week, where Fabian recommended a brand of beer.

On occasion some shows were produced as specials to focus on one single topic, such as the release of Ubuntu 8.04 or an interview with Bradley M. Kuhn.

== History ==
The first episode of Linux Outlaws was released on 5 September 2007. At the time both Dan and Fab were also hosting another Podcast Rathole radio. As Stefano Forenza says on his website "you know you're someone when you get cited twice in a single episode of LinuxOutlaws". Dan revived the name Rat Hole Radio as a music podcast in 2009.

== Production ==
Linux Outlaws was recorded simultaneously by the presenters in their respective homes – Hanover and Merseyside, England – and published in both the Ogg Vorbis and MP3 formats. The process involved recordings made by each presenter on his own machine, as well as a backup analogue recording by Fabian. Recordings were usually made on Monday in a live show, using IRC and releases of the show usually occur on Wednesday. Some changes in schedule occurred when a special show is released, such as an interview.

== Episodes ==
Linux Outlaws reached their 100th Episode on 6 July 2009.

They reached their 200th Episode on 10 April 2011.

They reached their 300th Episode on 17 February 2013.

Their 370th and final Episode was released on 29 December 2014.

== Notes ==
- "LinuxFormat". LF. Archived from the original on 2 January 2009.
- "TLLTS". TLLTS. Archived from the original on 8 July 2022.
- "GoingLinux". GoingLinux. Archived from the original on 26 December 2008.
- "Jono Bacon Blog". Jono Bacon Community Manager. Archived from the original on 23 October 2008.
- "Download Podcats from Podcast Alley". Podcast Alley. Archived from the original on 16 December 2008.
- "Adventures in Open Source". Dan Lynch. Archived from the original on 8 July 2011.
- "The Software Freedom Law Center Podcast". Bradley M. Kuhn and Karen Sandler. Archived from the original on 2 December 2008.
- "The Linux Link". Linc, Allen, Dann Washko. Archived from the original on 19 December 2008.

It also received mentions from several other related podcasts, such as LugRadio and The Linux Link Tech Show.
