= Jeremy Garcia =

American writer (born 1977)

- Born: Jeremy Garcia; October 9, 1977 (age 49); Buffalo, New York
- Website: http://jeremy.linuxquestions.org

Jeremy Garcia (born October 9, 1977) is a writer, podcaster, speaker and founder of LinuxQuestions.org. He was born in Buffalo, New York and attended the University at Buffalo.

== History ==
Garcia founded LinuxQuestions.org in 2000, shortly after starting his first full-time job relating to open source. An Android-related site was launched in 2011 and a ChromeOS site in 2013.

He serves on the board of Linux Fund and works as a consultant.

== Journalism ==
From 2003 to 2007 Garcia had a monthly Q&A column for Linux Magazine. He has written articles for Linux Pro, Linux Journal, and numerous websites. He has a monthly column on Opensource.com.

The December 2015 issue of Linux Journal featured him on the cover and contained an in-depth interview. He maintains a blog focused on Linux and Open Source.

== Podcasting ==
Garcia was an early podcaster, launching the LQ Radio podcast in late 2004. LQ Radio later expanded to include a show featuring various LinuxQuestions.org moderators. He appears on the Bad Voltage podcast, together with Jono Bacon and Stuart Langridge. They have performed live in Los Angeles, Pasadena and Fulda. He has been a guest on a variety of open source podcasts including The Linux Show and TLLTS.
