= RadioTux =

German technology podcast

Presentation
- Hosted by: Ingo Ebel, Steffen Zörnig (founders)
- Genre: technology podcast, news commentary podcast
- Language: German
- Updates: Monthly
- Length: Variable
- Country of origin: Germany

Production
- Production: Volunteer project
- No. of episodes: 119

Publication
- Provider: RadioTux

Related
- Website: radiotux.de

RadioTux is a German internet radio show. The topics are mostly around free and open source software, free operating systems like *BSD and Linux, as well as on sociopolitical issues. It was founded in 2001 and remains active as of 2025.

There have been made more than 500 shows and many interviews with people like Mark Shuttleworth, Miguel de Icaza, Hans Reiser, Jon “Maddog” Hall, Richard Stallman and so on. Since 2005 there are also several podcasts available one is the interview feed in English.

== History ==
RadioTux began as an audio-on-demand project for Linux and open-source topics. During its early years, the show offered downloadable episodes in MP3, RealAudio and Ogg/Vorbis formats and gradually expanded into terrestrial FM radio broadcasting. Between 2002 and 2005, RadioTux programmes were also aired via German community and free radio stations such as Juniradio (Berlin), Radio R.O.M., Radio Kanalratte and Radio Corax (Halle). Later, broadcasts were carried by the Berlin station reboot.fm as part of its independent cultural programming.

RadioTux logo

In its early years, a new episode was released every two weeks. Later, the production schedule shifted to a monthly format. Several volunteers are involved in this process; they include reports, essays, interviews and free music. Depending on the material these shows take 30 to 60 minutes. Users interested in the information only can download a stripped down version without music.

Throughout the 2000s and 2010s, RadioTux expanded into live event coverage at German open-source conferences including the Chemnitzer Linux-Tage, LinuxTag and CeBIT. In 2010, the project served as a media partner and moderator for an open-source programme at CeBIT in cooperation with LPI Central Europe, Univention and Linuxhotel.

Binärgewitter (literally "binary thunderstorm") is a technology podcast that originated as a spin-off of the RadioTux Talk format around 2011. The show focuses on topics such as web development, open-source culture, digital privacy, and technology policy, often from a developer’s perspective.

Since the 2020s, RadioTux has continued its presence at national and international open-source conferences. Many current interviews are recorded directly from industry and community events such as the KubeCon series, the Chemnitzer Linux-Tage, and the Free and Open Source Software Conference (FrOSCon), reflecting the project's ongoing focus on contemporary open-source and cloud-native technologies.

== Podcasts ==
When RadioTux started, podcasts were not yet known, so it can be considered being one of the first podcasts which came up and which is still existing.

Single articles and interviews are made available as podcast. So current news are instantly available. Due to categorisation users can subscribe to the newsfeeds of topics they are interested to and load them directly to MP3 player. This compatibility with current mobile playback devices is the reason why the podcast uses the MP3 format.

== Live ==
RadioTux often participates at Linux and similar events and reports live. Live broadcasts as comprehensive programming have been transmitted from LinuxTag, the Linux World Conference & Expo and the Chemnitzer Linux-Tage.

On live events RadioTux is being supported by the free radio station Kanal Ratte which provides studio equipment, streaming servers and airtime. Several shows are presented by Kanal Ratte staff and transmitted live into their programme which is available via FM, cable and livestream.

At the Linux World Conference & Expo 2006 in Cologne RadioTux for the first time has been media partner of an event.

Since November 2006 the weekly show RadioTux@HoRadS is presented at the Hochschulradio Stuttgart on FM and livestream. The common topics on Linux and free software were discussed there with studio guests, articles from the RadioTux archive (podcasts, interviews) provide appropriate background information.

== Topics and content ==
RadioTux focuses on developments within the Linux and open-source ecosystem, free-software community news and interviews with notable figures such as Mark Shuttleworth, Richard Stallman and Klaus Knopper. According to Focus on Linux, it is regarded as the oldest German-language Linux podcast.

== Recognition and impact ==
RadioTux has been cited as a long-standing media presence in the German-speaking FOSS ecosystem. Its archives comprise hundreds of episodes, many of which are still publicly accessible.

== See also ==
- List of technology podcasts
- Podcast
- Internet radio
- Free software movement
- Linux community
