= SouJava =

- Company type: Nonprofit, NGO
- Industry: Information Technology and Services
- Founded: September 1999
- Founders: Bruno Souza (JavaMan); Einar Saukas
- Headquarters: São Paulo, Brazil
- Website: http://soujava.org.br/

SouJava is a Brazilian Java User Group created to promote the Java programming language and other Open Source initiatives. It's recognized as the world's largest Java User Group with 40,000 members.

== History ==
Brazilian Java User Group SouJava was founded in September 1999 by Bruno Souza (JavaMan) and Einar Saukas. It was first registered officially as a technology group in Sucesu-SP (association of technology groups in Brazil), then later publicly announced in a press conference at October 29, 1999. The name (also spelled as SOUJava) is an acronym for "Sociedade de Usuarios Java" ("Java Users Society"), and "Sou Java" also means "I'm Java" in Portuguese.

Since the beginning, SouJava has always been a nonprofit organization supported by volunteer work, quite known by the enthusiasm of its members. It initially had a flat management structure (President and VP were originally Director and Associate Director in the original announcement press release, everybody else were simply referred as "members" except for a Technical Coordinator) but quickly migrated to a more formal model as membership grew rapidly. On November 28, 2004, SouJava acquired Non-Governmental Organization status upon reaching almost 18,000 members and got recognized as the world's largest Java User Group.

In 2011, SouJava became the first Java User Group nominated for the Java Community Process Executive Committee, as Java Community Process Expert Group Member. The following year, it was awarded as Java Community Process Member/Participant of the Year.

Over the years, SouJava has organized several Java conferences in Brazil, and it helped influence the adoption of open source by the Brazilian government (mainly by leading an open standards and platforms manifesto, organizing Javali at FISL, and working together with the Brazilian Federal Government's Information Technology National Institute), which in turn forced Sun Microsystems to open-source Java. It's also the co-creator, together with London Java User Group, of "Adopt a JSR" program, an effort to encourage JUG members and the wider Java community to get involved in JSRs

SouJava is headquartered in São Paulo, with branches in Campinas, Rio de Janeiro and Brasília.

=== Leadership ===
Executive leadership positions are voluntary and unpaid, elected by the director's board. SouJava mandates are listed below:

- 1999–2003: President Einar Saukas, Vice-President Jefferson Conz (Floyd), Technical Coordinator Bruno Souza (JavaMan).

== Honors and awards ==
- Java Community Process Member/Participant of the Year 2011: Nominated
- Java Community Process Member/Participant of the Year 2012: Winner
- Outstanding Adopt-a-JSR Participant of the Year 2013: Recognized
- Java Community Process Member/Participant of the Year 2014: Nominated
