= HuHa! =

British animation channel

- Network: YouTube

Programming
- Language: English

Ownership
- Owner: ChannelFlip

History
- Launched: 29 November 2012; 13 years ago
- Founder: Jonti Picking
- Closed: 14 January 2014; 12 years ago

Availability

Streaming media
- YouTube: HuHa!

HuHa! was a British animation channel owned by ChannelFlip. It launched in 2012 until ceased to 2014.

== Programming ==
- Evil Guy
- B.A.D Advice
- Difficult Second Job
- Ashens Animation
- New Eden
- Wobble Box
- HuHa Short Shorts
- Beef House
- Happy Harry
- Fantasy Office
- Ted or Dead
- Heroes of Animation
- Top Toons!
- Future Duck
- HuHa HaHa
- Cartoon World
- Twisted Fairytales
