= Ubuntu Podcast =

Technology podcast

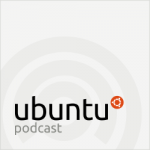
- Genre: Talk show (Linux, Free and open source software)
- Language: English

Cast and voices
- Hosted by: Alan Pope, Mark Johnson, Martin Wimpress

Technical specifications
- Audio format: MP3

Publication
- No. of seasons: 14
- Original release: March 2008; 18 years ago – September 2021; 4 years ago
- Updates: Weekly (Thursday)

Reception
- Ratings: 4.9/5

Related
- Website: https://ubuntupodcast.org/

Ubuntu Podcast was an Ubuntu Linux news and technology podcast formed by the Ubuntu UK Local Community Team. The show was based in England, UK, has a Telegram community group and multiple social network accounts dedicated to fostering inter-communication among fans.

== Presenters ==
While the show had various presenters over the years, the line-up for the final 5 seasons was Alan Pope, Mark Johnson and Martin Wimpress. Past presenters include Laura Cowen, Tony Whitmore, Ciemon Dunville and Dave Walker. Guest presenters on the show include Andy Piper, Anton Piatek, Dan Kermac, Emma Marshall, Joe Ressington, Joey Sneddon, Jon Spriggs, Laura Czajkowski, Paul Tansom and Stuart Langridge.

=== Alan Pope ===
Alan was formerly Community Manager, and then Developer Advocate at Canonical, before joining InfluxData as a Developer Advocate. Alan has been using Ubuntu since Warty Warthog. Formerly, Alan spent 13 years working as a system admin on German proprietary software while contributing to Ubuntu and Linux in his spare time. He first encountered Linux in the mid-1990s, and ran Red Hat then Debian on the desktop and server until Ubuntu Warty came out. Alan became an Ubuntu member in 2006 and has in the past been the contact person for the UK LoCo team, a member of the LoCo Council and a member of the EMEA Membership board and the Community Council. Alan was a presenter for every season of the show.

=== Mark Johnson ===
Mark develops mainly on the Moodle Virtual Learning Environment. He has used Ubuntu since Warty Warthog. His interest is focused on gaming on Ubuntu.

=== Martin Wimpress ===
Martin has been a Linux user since 1995 and first used the Warty Warthog release of Ubuntu. He became an Ubuntu member in 2016. In recent years Martin has worked with large scale Linux infrastructure and the transmission and analytics of Black box flight data. Martin was Director of Engineering for the Ubuntu Desktop team at Canonical and worked on desktop and devices before leaving the company in early 2021. In addition, he is one of lead developers of the MATE desktop environment and the Ubuntu MATE Linux distribution.

== Format ==
Episodes are packaged into seasons. Each season consists of about 40 episodes. An episode lasts for about 30 minutes, without any advertisements. The presenters usually speak in a family-friendly manner about their own work in the past week, discuss community news and upcoming events, talk about command-line tools and respond to listeners' feedback. The theme tune used for each episode is Crazy Words, Crazy Tune by the Savoy Havana band, recorded in 1927 and out of copyright.

== History ==
The first episode of the Ubuntu Podcast went live on March 11, 2008. Starting with season 8, the podcast rebranded from the Ubuntu UK Podcast to the Ubuntu Podcast. On September 9, 2021, the presenters announced that the show would be ending at the end of Season 14.

== Production ==
Ubuntu Podcast is recorded simultaneously by the presenters in their respective homes. The process involves recordings made by each presenter on their local machine in FLAC format using the software Audio Recorder. Recordings were usually made on Tuesday and published on Thursday. In latter years, two episodes were recorded back-to-back on the same evening, and released over the following two weeks, with post-production being performed by Joe Ressington, funded by a patreon campaign.

== Audio formats ==
The podcast was published in MP3 audio format on the Ubuntu Podcast, with options to stream content from Spotify or YouTube. The podcast was also formerly published in Ogg Vorbis format until the end of Series 10. Audio is licensed under Creative Commons Attribution-Share Alike 3.0 license.

== List of episodes ==
Seasons 8-14 can be downloaded from the official Ubuntu Podcast page. The full set is available via YouTube and the Internet Archive
