= ChannelFlip =

ChannelFlip Media Ltd
- Type: Subsidiary
- Industry: Technology
- Founded: 2007; 19 years ago London, England, UK
- Founder: Wil Harris; Justin Gayner
- Headquarters: London, United Kingdom
- Key people: Wil Harris (Managing Director); Justin Gayner (Creative Director)
- Number of employees: 18
- Parent: Banijay Group
- Website: channelflip.com

ChannelFlip Media Ltd was a London-based Multi Channel Network which worked with both traditional and online celebrities to create brand friendly content.

== Shows and talent ==
ChannelFlip worked with UK-based comedic TV and online talent.

- Robert Llewellyn – Machine of the Week Report (The MoWer) and Carpool.
- David Mitchell – David Mitchell's SoapBox – a series of short monologues co-written with John Finnemore. In these monologues Mitchell has criticized a variety of subjects, including the popular BBC show Doctor Who and 3D television.
- Richard Hammond – Richard Hammond's Tech Head – a weekly web series in which Top Gear's Richard Hammond discuss the latest technology happenings.
- Dawn Porter – Bad Girl Guides – six-part series providing lighthearted advice to women.
- Harry Hill – Little Internet Show – a sketch based comedy show.
- Simon's Cat – Simon's Cat, YouTube star
- Jonti Picking – MrWeebl, YouTube star
- Stuart Ashen – a.k.a. Ashens, a YouTube star who also worked with ChannelFlip in producing the Internet comedy film "Ashens and the Quest for the GameChild".

== History ==
=== Shine Group ownership ===
On 6 January 2012, Shine Group announced the acquisition of ChannelFlip.

=== YouTube Comedy Week ===
Channel Flip produced YouTube Comedy Week in the UK. Comedy week was an event that ran from May 20–25, and brought "the best of UK and US talent together on YouTube."

== Subsidiaries ==
- The Multiverse: In late 2012, ChannelFlip launched The Multiverse, a YouTube Channel that focused on "geek flavoured entertainment." The channel was created as a result of YouTube's original content partner scheme. Since then, videos uploaded to The Multiverse have included notable YouTubers including Ashens, Jack and Dean and Chris Kendall. The science fiction webshow Chronicles of Syntax is exclusively available on The Multiverse. As of the summer of 2014, the Multiverse ceased uploading videos to the channel. due to having their funding (from YouTube) abruptly stopped.
- HuHa!: Fronted by Jonti Picking, it is a YouTube Channel that is focused on "animation".
- FlipSide: A full service talent agency and management department for ChannelFlip. On 18 September 2014, ChannelFlip announced the creation of FlipSide.
- FlipHub: A new branded content agency, specialising in YouTube stars. On 18 September 2014, ChannelFlip announced the creation of FlipHub.

== Successes ==
Particular successes of Channel Flip include The Proxy, a short film sponsored by Dell and featuring YouTube star Ashens.

== See also ==
- Cost Per Mille
- Cost Per Impression
- List of YouTube personalities
