= Open Sources =

1999 book by O'Reilly Media

Open Sources: Voices from the Open Source Revolution
- Author: Chris DiBona, Sam Ockman, Mark Stone, Brian Behlendorf, Scott Bradner, Jim Hamerly, Marshall Kirk McKusick, Tim O'Reilly, Tom Paquin, Bruce Perens, Eric Raymond, Richard Stallman, Michael Tiemann, Linus Torvalds, Paul Vixie, Larry Wall, and Bob Young
- Subject: Free software history
- Published: January 1999
- Publisher: O'Reilly Media
- ISBN: 1-56592-582-3

Open Sources: Voices from the Open Source Revolution is a book published by O'Reilly Media. It is an anthology of essays written by luminaries of the open source and free software movements. The essays variously chronicle aspects of free software history, describe various philosophical positions, or sketch groups important to the movements.

The book is edited by Chris DiBona, Sam Ockman and Mark Stone. The essays contained were written by: Chris DiBona, Sam Ockman, Mark Stone, Brian Behlendorf, Scott Bradner, Jim Hamerly, Marshall Kirk McKusick, Tim O'Reilly, Tom Paquin, Bruce Perens, Eric Raymond, Richard Stallman, Michael Tiemann, Linus Torvalds, Paul Vixie, Larry Wall, and Bob Young.

The book is open source itself, published under a free license. Printed copies can be purchased, but the book is also available in its entirety for free online reading at the publisher's web site. Its sequel is similarly licensed, and has been made available through archive.org.

Open Sources has been required or recommended reading for a number of higher education courses.

== See also ==
- Open Sources 2.0
