= Justin Gayner =

British writer, broadcaster and producer (born 1977)

- Born: 30 August 1977 (age 49)
- Education: Eton College; Durham University
- Occupation: Businessman

Justin John Heydon Gayner (born 30 August 1977) is a British writer, broadcaster and producer. He is co-founder of British-based Internet entertainment website ChannelFlip. In November 2008, Gayner was voted one of the top 500 entrepreneurs in the UK by The Observer newspaper. Gayner also has a history in traditional television and media, writing for several publications such as the Daily Telegraph. He has created several TV formats and produced multiple comedy series for Warner Music Group and MySpace. In 2005, Gayner became the commercial director of QI Ltd, the company that produces the popular BBC show QI, presented by Stephen Fry. Gayner left QI Ltd in 2007 to start the UK's first online TV channel for men, ChannelFlip with co-founder Wil Harris. He is now the creative director for Channelflip as well as the host of their online film review show, ChannelFlip Film.

== Education ==
Gayner attended Eton College from 1990 to 1995, followed by three years at Durham University from 1995 where he studied English Literature.

== Selected works ==
- Strictly Come Dancing Interactive DVD Game
- Related to QI:
  - The QI Test: BBC pilot, co-creator and writer
  - The Book of General Ignorance
  - The Book of Animal Ignorance
  - The QI Annual
  - Producer of QI for three series
  - Wrote and produced QI News
