= Christina Warren =

American journalist, podcaster, and speaker (born

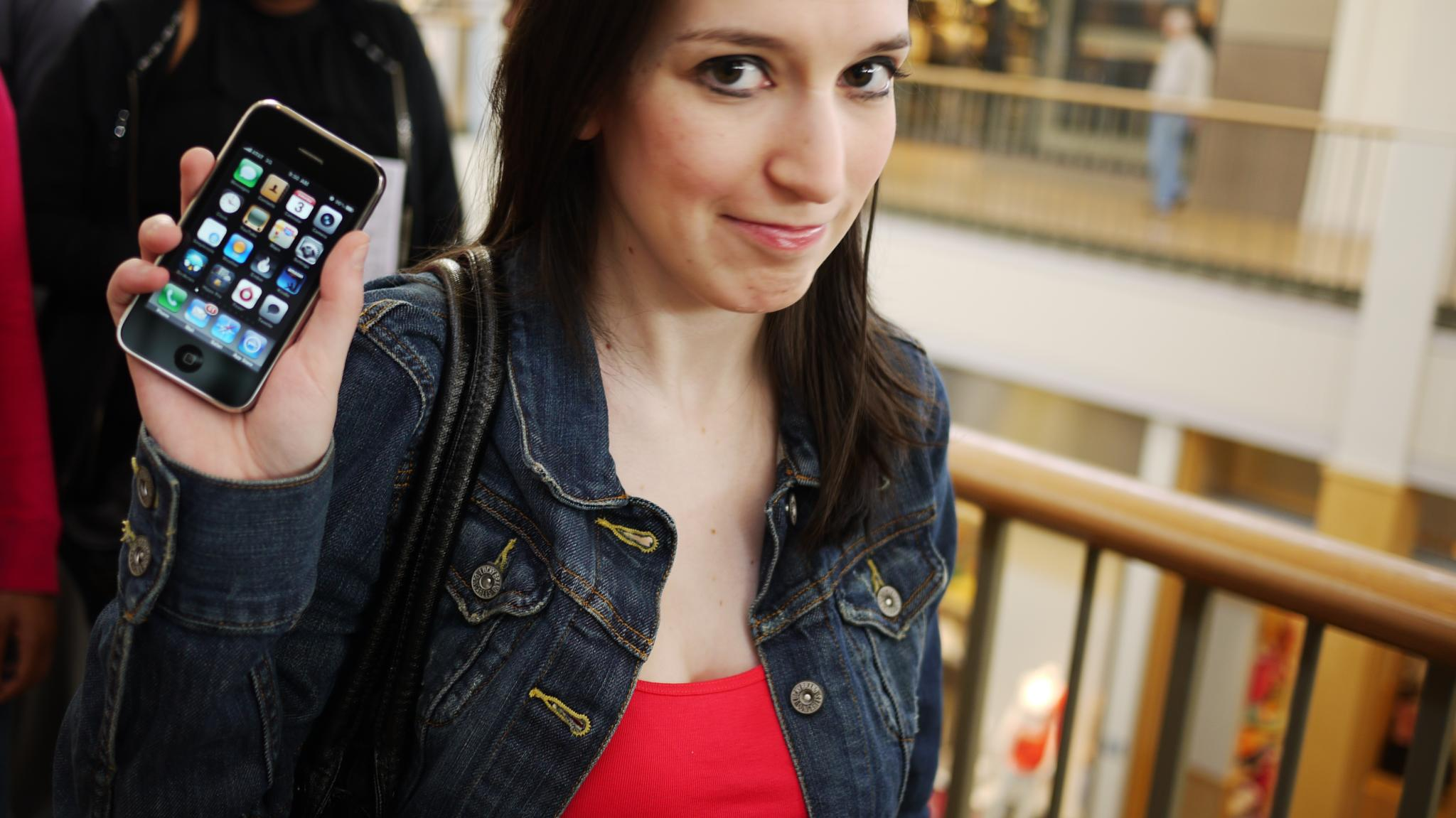
- Warren at the iPad Launch in Atlanta, Georgia, 2010
- Born: November 12, 1982 (age 44); Lawrenceville, Georgia
- Website: christina.is

Christina Warren (born November 12, 1982), is an American developer advocate, podcaster, and writer. She wrote for Mashable, The Unofficial Apple Weblog, and Downloadsquad.

== Work ==
Warren began her career as a freelance writer for USA Today in 2007, where she wrote about American Idol as an "Idol Coach". In 2009, she wrote for The Unofficial Apple Weblog and DownloadSquad.com. She was a co-host on the DownloadSquad's show, The Squadcast.

In 2009, Warren joined Mashable as a staff writer focusing on Apple, mobile tech and products.

In 2014, she appeared on CNN to discuss the Ebola outbreak and the role of social media in sharing information related to the epidemic.

In August 2016, Warren had left Mashable to join Gizmodo "as senior technology writer, a role that will see her as a marquis [sic] voice in defining Gizmodo's point of view on the major stories of the day".

She is a co-host of multiple podcast shows covering popular culture and technology. She co-hosts the technology-focused show Rocket on the Relay FM podcast network alongside Brianna Wu and Simone de Rochefort. In 2014, she started the Overtired podcast with Brett Terpstra on the Electronic Shadow Network. Warren has interviewed many well-known members of the tech industry including Fred Wilson, venture capitalist and Jony Ive, Chief Design Officer at Apple Inc.

In August 2016, Warren starred in a music video by the indie rock band Airplane Mode.

As of May 22, 2017, she was working for Microsoft as a Senior Cloud Developer Advocate where she, among other things, hosted This Week in Channel 9.

In March 2022, Warren moved to GitHub as a Senior Developer Advocate.

In January 2026, Warren was announced by Leo Laporte as the replacement regular co-host on MacBreak Weekly, replacing the long-standing Alex Lindsay who recently left for a full time position at Apple.

== Personal life ==
Born in Lawrenceville, Georgia on November 12, 1982, Christina Warren currently resides in Seattle, Washington with her husband, Grant.
