= Tips from the Top Floor =

Photography podcast

- Podcast Logo
- Genre: Photography

Cast and voices
- Hosted by: Chris Marquardt

Tips from the Top Floor is a podcast which presents tips and tricks about photography, mainly digital photography, in episodes normally ranging from 5 to 15 minutes in length and covering topics from image composition to post processing.

== Podcast ==
As of November 2025, there are 935 episodes of the show, the latest published on July 5, 2023. The show is both in audio and video format. The show is aimed mainly at beginner digital photographers, though the content is suitable for all levels of photographer. It is produced in English and hosted by Chris Marquardt, a photographer, sound professional, musician and media producer. Some shows are produced along with Leo Laporte's show, The Tech Guy and broadcast on the Premiere Radio Network as well as SiriusXM Satellite Radio.

== Awards ==
In 2005, the show won a Podcast Award in the Education category. It was nominated in the same category again in 2006 and 2007.

== Photocastnetwork ==
The podcast is also the flagship show of the Photocast Network, a community of podcasters producing content related to photography.
