= Clayton Morris =

American television host, real estate investor

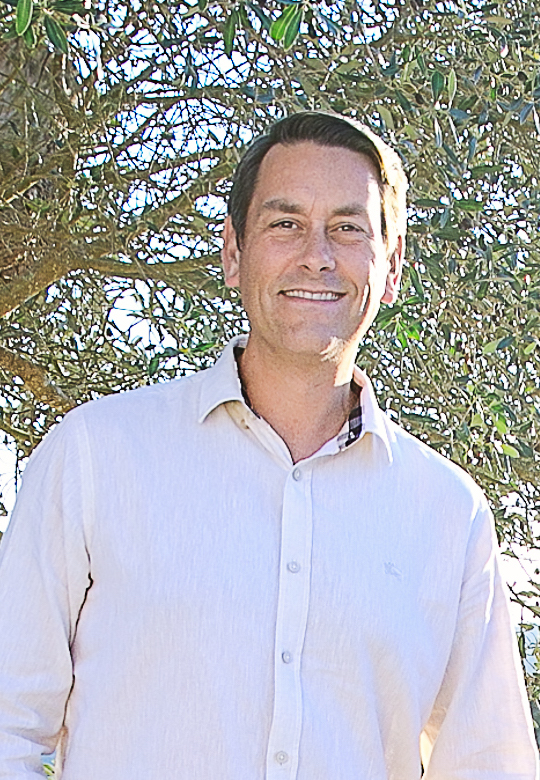
- Born: December 31, 1976 (age 49); Philadelphia, Pennsylvania, U.S.
- Education: University of Pittsburgh
- Occupations: Television presenter; real estate investor
- Spouse: Natali Morris (m. 2010)
- Children: 3
- Website: redacted.inc

Clayton Morris (born December 31, 1976) is an American YouTuber, real estate investor, and former television news anchor. He co-hosts Redacted News on the video platform Rumble and on his eponymous YouTube channel and a podcast on Investing in Real Estate.

After co-hosting The Daily Buzz and Good Day Philadelphia on Fox's WTXF-TV, he was a co-host of Fox & Friends Weekend on Fox News Channel from 2008 to 2017. He covered consumer technology for Fox and hosted weekly technology segments for Fox News Radio and Fox News. On September 4, 2017, he left Fox News. His real estate ventures have been the subject of several lawsuits, including one filed by the state of Indiana.

== Early life ==
Morris was born in Philadelphia and attended Wilson High School in Spring Township in Berks County (today West Lawn, Pennsylvania), during which time he briefly hosted a comedy show on the local Berks Community Television public access channel. He graduated with a bachelor's degree from the University of Pittsburgh in 1999.

== Career ==
=== Television, film, and radio ===
In 2000, Morris appeared in a low-budget thriller film entitled Deception. His television career began when he was a producer for Good Day LA at KTTV, the Fox-owned television station in Los Angeles.

Morris then went on to reporting and anchoring positions at WVVA in Bluefield, West Virginia, and later with the Montana Television Network as a political reporter in the state capital, Helena. He went on to work for The Daily Buzz, a syndicated television morning show, as news correspondent and later host.

In January 2007, Morris was hired by WTXF-TV, the Fox TV station in Philadelphia, to host its morning show, Good Day Philadelphia. He announced in October 2007 that he would leave the station at year's end. Morris then co-hosted Fox & Friends Weekend for Fox News Channel from 2008 to 2017.

In 2012, Morris won the seventh annual "New York's Funniest Reporter" contest, which benefits the Humane Society of New York.

=== Financial journalism and real estate ventures ===
Morris hosts the Investing in Real Estate podcast and Morris Invest YouTube channel, and he developed the Financial Freedom Academy, an online financial planning service. Morris and his wife Natali Morris co-authored a book, How to Pay Off Your Mortgage in 5 Years. They also co-host a daily YouTube show on their Redacted channel.

In March 2019, investors filed more than two dozen lawsuits in Indiana and New Jersey, claiming that Morris was running a Ponzi scheme involving the sales of some houses in C- and D-class neighborhoods that were marketed through his investment company, Morris Invest, in Indianapolis. The investors claimed they were sold rental properties which Morris Invest promised to rehabilitate and rent out, earning them rental income. These properties belonged to Bert Whalen. Some investors claimed that they later discovered the properties they received rental income from for several months were boarded up and vacant, and they began receiving city code and country health department violations. Others found they had purchased vacant lots, small shacks or buildings that were falling down. Morris denied responsibility, asserting he referred investors to Whalen and that Whalen was responsible for managing the properties, even though many investors believed they were dealing directly with Morris. In November 2019, Whalen was indicted by a federal grand jury for defrauding investors; the indictment did not name Morris. Whalen pleaded guilty in March 2022.

Morris sued HoltonWiseTV in federal court in October 2019 for $7.2 million, alleging copyright infringement; the case stemmed from HoltonWiseTV's production of a three-hour documentary investigating the alleged involvement of Morris in various real estate scams. In March 2020, Morris lost the suit.

In May 2020, the state of Indiana filed a civil lawsuit against Clayton Morris, among others, for violating Indiana's deceptive sales and home loan acts in real estate deals involving more than 150 properties in Marion County.

== Personal life ==
He and his wife, Natali, have three children and lived in Maplewood, New Jersey, until 2019. They initially planned to move to Pennsylvania in early 2019 but moved to Portugal later that year, with Natali Morris citing the "collective soul challenge" in their business as a reason to leave the country. The family at the time had moved to the country on temporary visas to allow their children to attend schools overseas. The move to Portugal drew criticism from investors suing Morris at the time, who worried that his relocation could make it harder for them to retrieve damages if courts found in their favor.
