= New Eden (web series) =

British animated web series

- Genre: Science fiction; Adventure; Comedy
- Created by: Brett Snelgrove; Frank Van Haagen
- Written by: Brett Snelgrove
- Directed by: Frank Van Haagen
- Voices of: Jonathan Rhodes; Kevin Shen; Scott Christie; Jo Bowls
- Theme music composer: Justin Bryant
- Composer: Justin Bryant
- Country of origin: United Kingdom
- Original language: English
- No. of episodes: 12

Production
- Producer: Brett Snelgrove
- Running time: 1–5 minutes
- Production company: HuHa!

Original release
- Network: YouTube
- Release: 13 March – 3 December 2013

New Eden is a British animated web series created by Brett Snelgrove and Frank Van Haagen, the series debuted on HuHa! YouTube channel.

== Premise ==
New Eden follows the misadventures of Murray and Hamilton, two starship crewmen who are marooned and fighting for their survival after crashing on the wrong planet.

== Voice cast ==
- Jonathan Rhodes as Murray
- Kevin Shen as Hamilton

== Episodes ==
No.	Title	Original release date
1	"You Never See This on Star Trek"	13 March 2013
2	"Mating Calls"	20 March 2013
3	"Mummy"	27 March 2013
4	"Slappin' Slug"	3 April 2013
5	"Files"	10 April 2013
6	"Pink Eyes"	2 October 2013
7	"Ape Sh!t"	10 October 2013
8	"Jinx"	7 November 2013
9	"Droid"	14 November 2013
10	"Freeballing"	20 November 2013
11	"Mother Hen"	28 November 2013
12	"Eden"	3 December 2013
