= Danese Cooper =

American open source software advocate

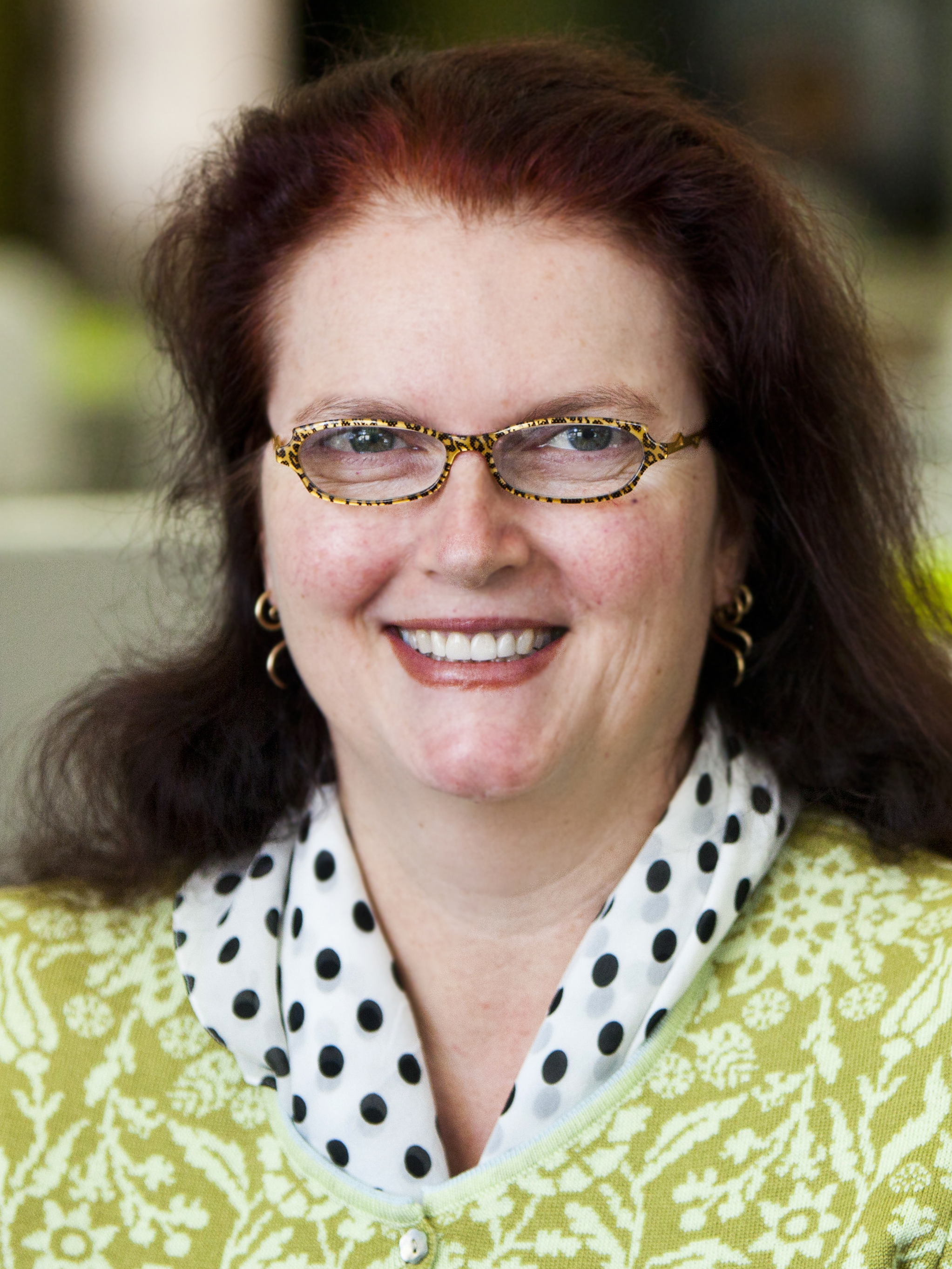
- Cooper in 2010
- Education: University of California, Los Angeles (BA)
- Website: danesecooper.blogs.com

Danese Cooper is an American programmer, computer scientist and advocate of open source software.

== Career ==
Cooper has managed teams at Symantec and Apple Inc. For six years, she served as chief open source "evangelist" for Sun Microsystems before leaving to serve as senior director for open source strategies at Intel. In 2009 she worked as "Open Source Diva" at REvolution Computing (now Revolution Analytics). She is a board member of the Open Source Hardware Association. She is a board observer at Mozilla, and serves as a member of the Apache Software Foundation. She was a board member at the Drupal Association and the Open Source Initiative. In October 2018, Danese joined Irish tech company NearForm as VP of Special Initiatives.

=== Open source ===
Cooper's major work within the open source area of computer software has garnered her the nickname "Open Source Diva". She was recruited, while at a sushi bar in Cupertino, to a position at Sun working towards opening the source code to Java. Within six months she quit frustrated by the claims of open source development with Java that Sun made, only to find that little "open sourcing" was taking place. Sun sought to keep Cooper understanding her need to further open source software and re-hired her as their corporate open source officer. Her six years with Sun Microsystems is credited as the key to the company opening up its source code and lending support to Sun's OpenOffice.org software suite, Oracle Grid Engine, among others. In 2009 she joined REvolution Computing, a "provider of open source predictive analytics solutions", to work on community outreach amongst developers unfamiliar with the programming language R and general open source strategies. She has also made public speaking appearances discussing open sourcing, speaking at the Malaysian National Computer Confederation Open Source Compatibility Centre, OSCON, gov2.0 Expo, and the Southern California Linux Expo. In 2005 Cooper was a contributing author to Open Sources 2.0: The Continuing Evolution.

=== Wikimedia Foundation ===
In February 2010 Cooper was appointed chief technical officer of the Wikimedia Foundation, leading their technical team and developing and executing the Foundation's technical strategy, along with which she would also be working on outreach with Wikimedia volunteers to expand on development and localizing of software. Cooper credits the open source community in helping her obtain the position at Wikimedia. She left the organization in July 2011.

=== InnerSource ===
Danese Cooper is the founder and chair of the InnerSource Commons Foundation. In 2018 she co-authored Adopting InnerSource with Klaas-Jan Stol which was published by O'Reilly.

=== daneseWorks ===
In June 2011, Cooper started a consultancy, daneseWorks, whose first client was inBloom. She is also currently helping Numenta with their open source & machine learning strategy.

== Personal life ==
Danese Cooper obtained her high school diploma from Chadwick School and her B.A. from the University of California, Los Angeles. Upon graduation she spent time in Morocco as a volunteer in the Peace Corps. Cooper credits her time with the Peace Corps as fostering her desire to travel and work within the developing world to explore policy, education and how open source software can "give certain kids another alternative". She is married to a software developer and enjoys knitting.

== See also ==
- List of Wikipedia people
