= Stuart Langridge =

Software programmer (born 1976)

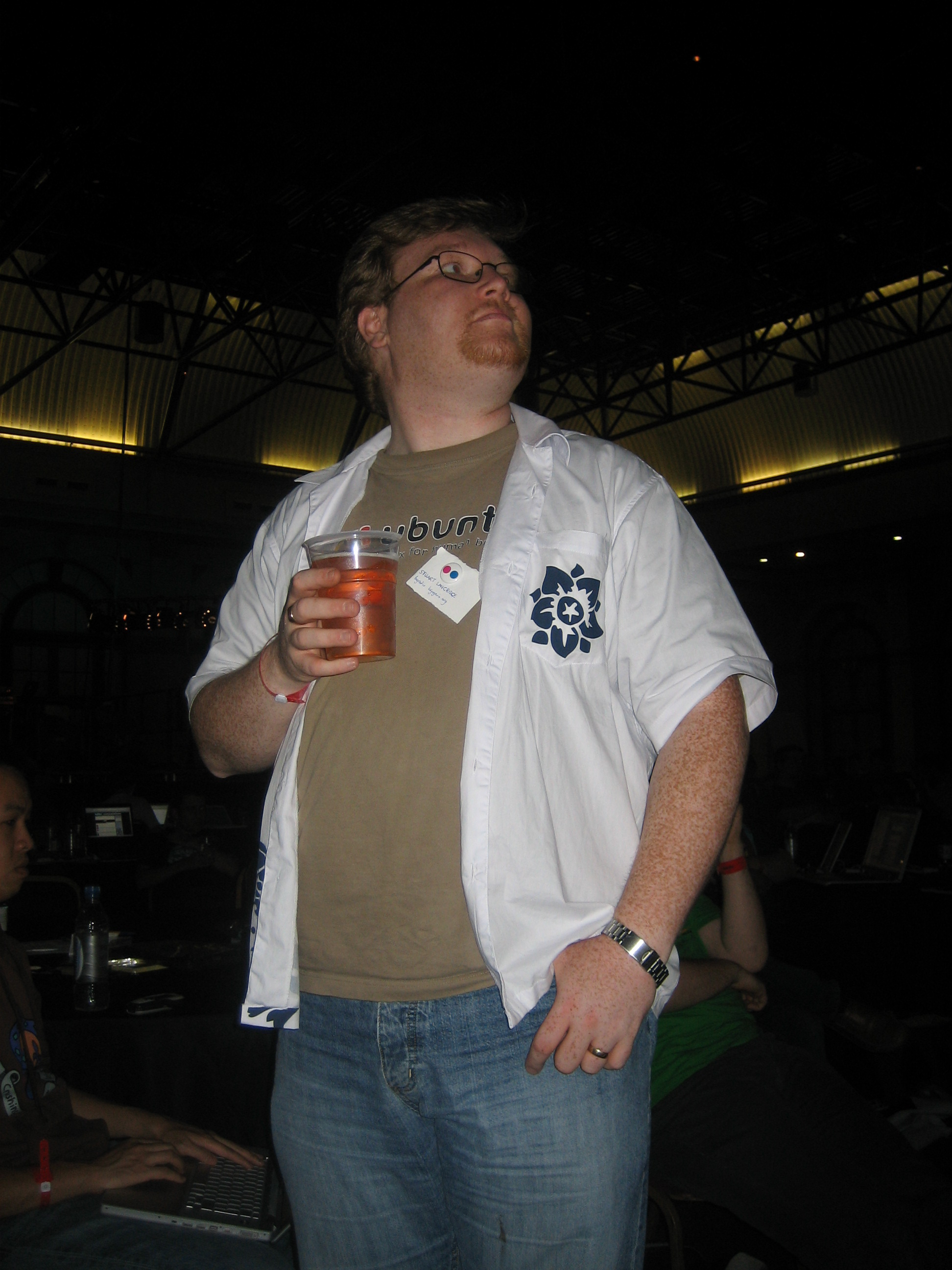
- Langridge at Yahoo! BBC Hackday 2007 at Alexandra Palace
- Born: January 30, 1976 (age 50)

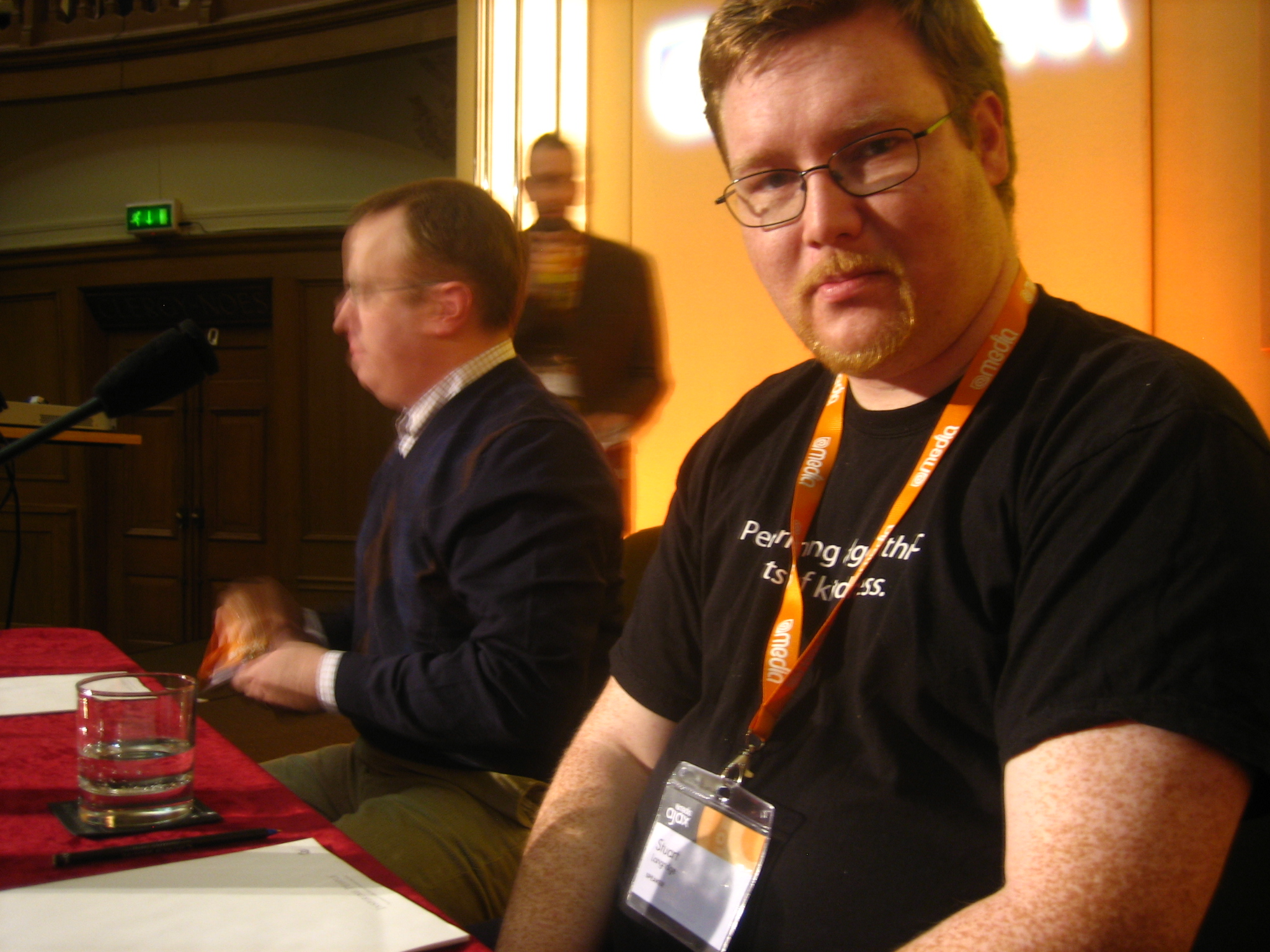
Stuart Langridge in foreground as a panelist at @media ajax 2007 conference

Stuart Langridge (also known as 'Aq' or 'Zippy' ) is a podcaster, developer and author. He became a member of the Web Standards Project's DOM Scripting Task Force, an invited expert on the W3C HTML Working Group and is an acknowledged commentator on W3C Document Object Model and JavaScript techniques.

== Podcasts ==
Langridge is known as a presenter of the now defunct LugRadio, which was a free software podcast in the UK. Along with Jono Bacon, he was the longest-serving member of the team and often served to incite discussion about issues that more directly related to software freedom. In LugRadio he frequently advocated freedom, yet despite this often attracted criticism for using proprietary software.

Langridge was involved in the Shot of Jaq podcast, in collaboration with his former Lugradio co-host Jono Bacon. He's now a part of the Bad Voltage podcast, together with Jono Bacon and Jeremy Garcia (founder of LinuxQuestions.org). Bryan Lunduke (founder of Jupiter Broadcasting) was also a founder member of the Bad Voltage podcast but has since moved on due to other commitments. The podcast first aired in October 2013.

== Programming ==
He has worked on projects including Jokosher, a multi-track audio editor for GNOME, and Jackfield, a program to run Mac OS X Dashboard widgets under GNOME.

== Career ==
In January 2009 Langridge joined Canonical as a developer and left the company in 2013 to work as a freelancer for Kryogenix's consulting. At Canonical he worked on the Desktop Couch for Ubuntu in his role as Canonical Ltd. staffer. In 2021 he joined Open Web Advocacy as an organiser. In September 2024 Langridge joined Barnardo's as a part-time senior design engineer.

=== Author ===
Langridge has written two books for technical publisher SitePoint, DHTML Utopia, and Run Your Own Web Server Using Linux & Apache (with Tony Steidler-Dennison) as well as writing the Stylish Scripting weblog during 2005.
