= This Week in Tech =

Technology podcast

- Genre: Roundtable, Technology News
- Language: English

Cast and voices
- Hosted by: Leo Laporte, Various Panelists

Production
- Production: TWiT.tv
- Length: 150-180 minutes

Technical specifications
- Picture format: 16:9
- Video format: MP4 HD
- Audio format: MP3

Publication
- No. of episodes: 1,027
- Original release: April 17, 2005; 21 years ago
- Provider: TWiT.tv
- Updates: Weekly
- License: CC-BY-NC-SA (before 2015-04-09); CC-BY-NC-ND

Reception
- Ratings: 4.3/5, 4.3/5

Related
- Website: twit.tv/twit

This Week in Tech–casually referred to as TWiT, and briefly known as Revenge of the Screen Savers–is the weekly flagship podcast and namesake of the TWiT.tv network. It is hosted by Leo Laporte and many other former TechTV employees, and is currently produced by Benito Gonzalez. It features round-table discussions and debates surrounding current technology news and reviews, with a particular focus on consumer electronics and the Internet. With the closing of the TWiT "eastside" studios in Petaluma, California, United States, it is now produced virtually. Prior to that, it was produced at the former "brickhouse" studios where it had been produced for 5 years, and earlier at the TWiT "cottage", where it was produced for over 6 years. The podcast is streamed live on Sundays at 2:15 pm Pacific Time.

== Format ==
Leo Laporte typically begins an episode of TWiT by stating the show's number, title, sponsors and playing the theme tune, then introducing the week's panelists and guests. The panelists update the audience by discussing their recent projects or work. The main portion of the show consists of a round-table discussion and debate, pegged loosely to a selection of the week's major technology headlines. The format of the show encourages spontaneity and the conversation often diverges wildly from technology topics. This causes the length of each episode to vary, sometimes considerably, from show to show, although most episodes run approximately two hours. Each episode typically features three or four commercial breaks, usually in the form of a "live read" from Laporte that may include interaction with the panelists (e.g., Laporte usually prompts guests for recommended audiobooks during spots for frequent advertiser Audible.com). The show closes with each panelist giving a personal "plug" for their affiliated website or Twitter account.

== Panelists ==
The most frequently recurring guests on TWiT included John C. Dvorak, Patrick Norton, Wil Harris, Kevin Rose, Robert Heron, David Prager, Tom Merritt, Roger Chang, and Jason Calacanis. Futurist Amy Webb and journalists Iain Thomson, Alex Wilhelm, and Dwight Silverman are among the frequent panelists in more recent years. Other guests include Becky Worley, Steve Gibson, Xeni Jardin, Alex Lindsay, Owen Stone, Veronica Belmont and Molly Wood.

The show has had a number of famous guests, including Steve Wozniak, Kevin Mitnick, John Hodgman, Lawrence Lessig, artist Roger McGuinn, as well as Star Trek: The Next Generation cast members LeVar Burton (Geordi La Forge) and Wil Wheaton (Wesley Crusher).

In September 2015, Leo Laporte famously "banned" his long-time friend and frequent TWiT guest John C. Dvorak from the show for various comments Dvorak made on Twitter. In reply to Dvorak's comments that Laporte was biased, Laporte told Dvorak "you won't ever have to worry about it again", insinuating that he never wanted Dvorak back on TWiT. Laporte apologized a few days later, but continued to berate Dvorak publicly. Dvorak returned to TWiT on December 23, 2018.

== History ==
The program began when Laporte recorded a one-off round-table discussion between himself, Patrick Norton, Sarah Norton, Kevin Rose, David Prager, and Roger Chang at the 2005 Macworld Expo in San Francisco.

After publishing the show on his blog to an enthusiastic public reception, Laporte decided to rename this discussion "episode 0" and turned the round-table concept into a weekly downloadable audio file, or "podcast," featuring more cast members from his former TechTV program The Screen Savers. The first episode was posted on Monday, April 18, 2005, as Revenge of the Screen Savers, but it was temporarily renamed "Return of the [BEEP]" and shortly thereafter changed in response to a cease and desist letter sent to Laporte from Comcast, owners of TechTV's intellectual property rights, arguing it too closely resembled the defunct show's name. (TWiT started using the Screen Savers trademark after Comcast allowed it to expire, and The New Screen Savers was launched as a separate weekly program on May 2, 2015.) In episode 2, Laporte announced a contest in which listeners could suggest a new name for the show. One listener suggested This Week in Geek, which inspired Laporte to create the eventual name, This Week in Tech, or TWiT.

The weekly show was originally recorded with all of the hosts staying at their respective homes and talking via Voice over IP (mostly using Skype). Starting around episode 10, Norton began physically coming to Leo's Petaluma office during the taping. Upon Rose's announcement that he was moving to San Francisco, Laporte started to gather the panelists for public live tapings in the San Francisco area, with most episodes being videotaped and released as a video podcast download.

During the fall of 2005, several of the previously regular hosts began to move on to other projects, resulting in the format of the show changing, from being a show with a core group of hosts and occasional guests, into Laporte being the only regular host, and inviting in a variety of different guests each show. Around the same time, the people responsible for filming the shows, the Pixel Corps and their leader, Alex Lindsay became more involved with the show, with many also contributing.

During the first few years TWiT episodes were made available in a variety of file formats for individual download or RSS subscription. These included a standard 64 kbit/s MP3, a low-bandwidth 16 kbit/s MP3, Advanced Audio Coding (AAC), and open source Ogg Vorbis. However, the Ogg Vorbis version of the show ceased to be offered in August 2009 with the AAC and low bandwidth MP3 versions ending in early November 2009. In response, Leo Laporte stated that he was a believer that his content should be made available to the widest audience possible in the format of their choice, as well as philosophically agreeing with the open source nature of Ogg Vorbis. However the time and effort the TWiT Staff needed to encode, upload, and distribute alternate audio formats in the limited time between recording and release each Sunday evening was not justified by the number of people choosing to listen to them.

The final episode of This Week in Tech recorded at TWiT's Eastside Studio was livestreamed on August 5, 2024. This was also the first ever spatial livestream which could be watched by Apple Vision Pro users.

The show recording is usually posted every Sunday evening.

== Awards ==
TWiT has won two Podcast Awards, as both the "People's Choice" and as "Best Technology Podcast". This Week in Tech also made Time Magazine's Top 10 Podcasts of 2006, ranked 9th. It also won Podcast of the Year from the 2007 Weblog Awards.

== Video ==
TWiT began as an audio podcast, although several video episodes were filmed in the first few years of the show. Starting in 2008, the show was made available for live streaming in both audio and video formats. Since episode 215 in October 2009, the show has been available weekly as both an audio and video download as well as on YouTube.

== Distribution and licensing ==
All episodes are licensed under the Creative Commons attribution share-alike noncommercial license, and are distributed via direct download from the TWiT.tv website, from Apple's iTunes Store, or as a subscription on any device with the necessary internet connection and podcasting software. There is no charge to download current or past shows.

The show is typically available in three formats: 64 kbit/s MP3, 32 kbit/s MP3, and 64 kbit/s AAC. Occasionally, other bitrates are used for episodes produced in stereo, however most episodes are monaural. The files are available as direct downloads, with bandwidth provided by Cachefly. On February 23, 2014, before recording TWiT 446, Laporte stated that episode bandwidth for the entire network is around 950 terabytes per month.

A sponsorship deal with America Online was announced on July 4, 2005, following the server demand that resulted from the release of iTunes 4.9's built-in podcasting directory. Since the new TWiT website was launched, the TWiT Torrent server initially preferred by Laporte has ceased operation. In several episodes, Laporte has noted that the distributed nature of BitTorrent makes it impossible to accurately gauge the popularity of the show, decreasing the likelihood of attracting advertisers. As of episode 174, TWiT began being hosted from AOL Radio. AOL hosting ended in the summer of 2013.

== Funding ==
Laporte stated in episode 3 that the show would always remain free and without advertising. However, due to ongoing costs as a result of TWiT.tv's constant expansion, a roadmap for the introduction of podcast and web-based advertising was announced during episode 45 of This WEEK in TECH. On September 5, 2006, TWiT.tv officially became one of the first major advertising-supported podcast networks, sponsored initially by both Visa and Dell.

Listeners have always been invited to support the network by means of an automatic PayPal subscription or one-time payment. In the past, this granted access to an exclusive TWiT forum which no longer exists, yet donations are still accepted. Listener funding has been used for the operational costs of the network including improvements to Laporte's recording studio and to purchase radio-quality microphones and digital audio-recording devices for the hosts. Financial compensation for the network mostly comes from the network's sponsors. Sponsors of the network include Ford, Audible, Lantronix, Squarespace, Hulu, Rackspace, Hover, Carbonite, Stamps.com and more.

Podtrac said TWIT's advertising revenue doubled in 2009 and expected $4 million for 2010.

Before recording started for This Week in Tech 268 on October 3, 2010, while discussing the sale of TechCrunch to AOL, Laporte mentioned that his network would "do three to four [million US$]" in advertising revenue for 2010. Based on the increase in the number of sponsored programs as well as the increase in sponsors, the 2013 gross revenue is estimated to be in the eight million dollar range. This Week in Tech Episode 561 on August 5, 2016, had extensive talk about podcast revenue. In the episode, Leo Laporte said a recent New York Times article stated that podcasts ad revenue was $57 million per year and "If that's true, than I actually own 25% of all of the podcasting revenue in the world." This would put TWIT ad revenue around $13–14 million per year.

== See also ==
- TWiT.tv Network
- List of technology podcasts
