= Bruno Souza (programmer) =

- Born: Bruno Ferreira de Souza
- Known for: Founding SouJava
- Website: www.javaman.com.br

Bruno Souza is a Brazilian Java programmer and open source software advocate. He was President of SouJava, a Brazilian Java User Group he helped establish which became the world's largest. He was one of the initiators of the Apache Harmony project to create a non-proprietary Java virtual machine. He's known as the "Brazilian JavaMan"

Bruno is a member of the board of directors at the Open Source Initiative representing Affiliate members. This is his second term on the OSI Board. He is also a member of the executive committee of the Java Community Process. In 2010, he co-founded ToolsCloud, a developer tools provider.
