= The Screen Savers =

American television series (1998–2005)

- Directed by: Chris Strand
- Starring: Leo Laporte (1998-2004); Kate Botello (1998-2000); Patrick Norton (2000-04); Kevin Rose (2004-05); Alex Albrecht (2004); Sarah Lane (2004-05)
- Country of origin: United States
- Original language: English
- No. of episodes: 1,483

Production
- Executive producers: Paul Block (2001–2004); Jim Downs (2004)
- Producers: Ken Marquis; Joshua Brentano
- Running time: 90 minutes (April 2, 2001–January 24, 2003); 60 minutes (May 11, 1998–March 30, 2001; January 27, 2003–March 18, 2005)

Original release
- Network: ZDTV (1998–2000); TechTV (2000–2004); G4TechTV (2004–2005); G4 (2005); TWiT.tv (2015–2018)
- Release: May 11, 1998 – March 18, 2005

Related
- Tekzilla

The Screen Savers is an American television program dedicated to computers, technology, and gadgets that aired on ZDTV (later rebranded as TechTV) from 1998 to 2005. The program provided viewers with practical tech tips, news updates, gadget reviews, and interactive segments like call-ins and modding demonstrations.

The program originally featured host Leo Laporte alongside co-host Kate Botello. In April 2000, Botello departed to co-host GameSpot TV, and Patrick Norton joined Laporte as co-host. Following the 2004 merger of TechTV with Comcast-owned G4, a gaming-focused channel, the show's format shifted toward pop culture and video games, with Kevin Rose and Alex Albrecht taking over as hosts in late 2004. The series concluded on March 18, 2005, as part of broader changes from the merger, which prioritized gaming content and led to the rebranding of The Screen Savers into Attack of the Show! on the newly formed G4techTV.

In 2015, Laporte revived the concept as The New Screen Savers, an hour-long variety show on his online TWiT.tv network, featuring rotating co-hosts such as Megan Morrone, Jason Howell, and Robert Ballecer, along with guest appearances from original cast members Norton and Botello. The revival premiered on May 2, 2015, and ran for three seasons, concluding in December 2018.

== History ==
The Screen Savers premiered on May 11, 1998, as part of ZDTV. It aired live from San Francisco, California. Originally hosted by Leo Laporte and Kate Botello, the show featured a large and continually changing group of contributors.

In April 2000, Kate Botello left the show. Patrick Norton took her spot, and he and Laporte hosted the show for much of its run. A few months after Botello left, ZDTV became TechTV.

For much of its run, The Screen Savers had a running time of 60 minutes. This was later changed to 90 minutes (the expansion coming with the advent of the 'TechLive' all-day news format in 2001), but was reduced back to its original length due to scheduling conflicts and the difficulty of creating enough content for a 90-minute program.

In 2002, the show built a new set and designed a new logo and graphics. The new set was much larger and brighter than the previous "basement" set. The new set offered more room for the studio audience, application-specific areas, a dedicated LAN Party section, and a new lab for Yoshi. On December 17, 2002, the show celebrated its 1,000th episode.

2004 was a watershed year for The Screen Savers. Laporte left The Screen Savers to focus on hosting Call for Help, and Kevin Rose took his spot. Soon after Comcast bought TechTV in order to merge it with their struggling gaming channel G4, the TechTV offices were hit with massive layoffs affecting over 200 personnel. G4 moved the show to their studios in Los Angeles, California. The first Los Angeles based episode aired on September 7, 2004. Norton declined to move with the show, opting to remain in San Francisco with his new wife. Alex Albrecht took his spot. On November 11, 2004, Kevin Rose, Sarah Lane, and Alex Albrecht announced on their personal blogs that G4 had decided to revamp The Screen Savers by making it more pop culture, Internet, and gaming-oriented. Alex Albrecht, Yoshi DeHerrera, Dan Huard, executive producer Paul Block and the show's entire staff (mostly TechTV employees) either resigned, made separation deals with G4, or were officially terminated. After the layoffs, the show changed formats, leaving computer and technology-focused content and adopting a gaming and entertainment variety show style that presented gaming and technology related news, product demonstrations, software clinics, interviews with notable people, live music, and such original segments as Dark Deals, Gems of the Internet, and It Came from eBay.

In 2004, Dan Huard, who had just been terminated from the show, admitted that many of the live calls on the show, since moving down to L.A. to be with G4, were staged.

New episodes of the revamped show, which would later become Attack of the Show!, began on November 29, 2004; without a live studio audience. Kevin Pereira and Chi-Lan Lieu took over hosting duties. Chi-Lan later left G4 and was replaced as co-host briefly by Sarah Lane and finally by Kevin Rose. The final hosts of The Screen Savers were Kevin Rose and Kevin Pereira. The show's executive producer was Jim Downs.

On March 17, 2005, the cast announced that on March 25, 2005, The Screen Savers would officially end. The first episode of the officially titled Attack of the Show! aired on March 28, 2005.

In April 2015, Leo Laporte announced his version of The Screen Savers, under a slightly different name in 'The New Screen Savers' and lasted through the end of 2018. The show, recorded at 3PM Pacific time on Saturday afternoons, has been made available as an audio and video netcast. Unlike the TechTV version of the show, this revamp featured Laporte alongside a rotating series of co-hosts, some of whom had a history with the show, such as Kate Botello, Patrick Norton, Megan Morrone and Kevin Rose. Other co-hosts were employees of the TWiT network but had no past connection to the show, such as Mike Elgan, Jason Howell, Father Robert Ballecer SJ and Bryan Burnett. The final live show was on December 22, 2018, followed by a pre-recorded "Best of 2018" episode on December 29, 2018.

== Format ==
Each show began with a short commentary on the day's technology-related news stories, sometimes accompanied by an online poll. This was followed by a call for help from a viewer, either through telephone or netcam. Early in the show's run, this was followed by Leo's Boot Camp, designed to help people who were new to computers. More calls were answered throughout the show, along with a variety of segments. These included various interviews, coverage of special events, The Twisted List, Site of the Night, and Download of the Day. As each show came to an end, questions sent in by email were answered. For part of the show's run, quotations sent in from viewers were read at this time.

== Segments ==
Here are a few of the many segments which appeared on The Screen Savers:

- "Bit Chat"
- "Dark Deals"
- "Dark Tips"
- "Download of the Day"
- "Live Calls"
- "Photoshop Challenge"
- "Show and Tell"
- "Site of the Nite"
- "Talkback"
- "The Giz Wiz"
- "The Screen Savers LAN Party"
- "Twisted List"
- "Windows Tips"
- "Windows Tweaks"
- "Yoshi's Mods"
- "Mac Minute"
- "Geek Library"

== Hosts and correspondents ==
Leo Laporte served as the founder and primary host of The Screen Savers from its inception in 1998 until 2004, and he returned as the lead host for the program's revival on TWiT.tv starting in 2015. Kate Botello co-hosted the program with Laporte from its launch in 1998 until April 2000, when she departed to co-host GameSpot TV. Patrick Norton joined as co-host in 2000 and remained until 2004. Kevin Rose and Alex Albrecht hosted from late 2004 to the program's end in 2005. In the revival era, Megan Morrone, Jason Howell, and Robert Ballecer emerged as key rotating co-hosts alongside Laporte from 2015 onward.

== See also ==
- This Week in Tech – A weekly podcast hosted by Leo Laporte and other former cast members of The Screen Savers.
- Revision3 – an IPTV company founded by Kevin Rose and Dan Huard with shows hosted by Rose, Albrecht, Sargent, Norton, Lane, and Corbin
