= Wil Harris =

British businessman and journalist (born 1982)

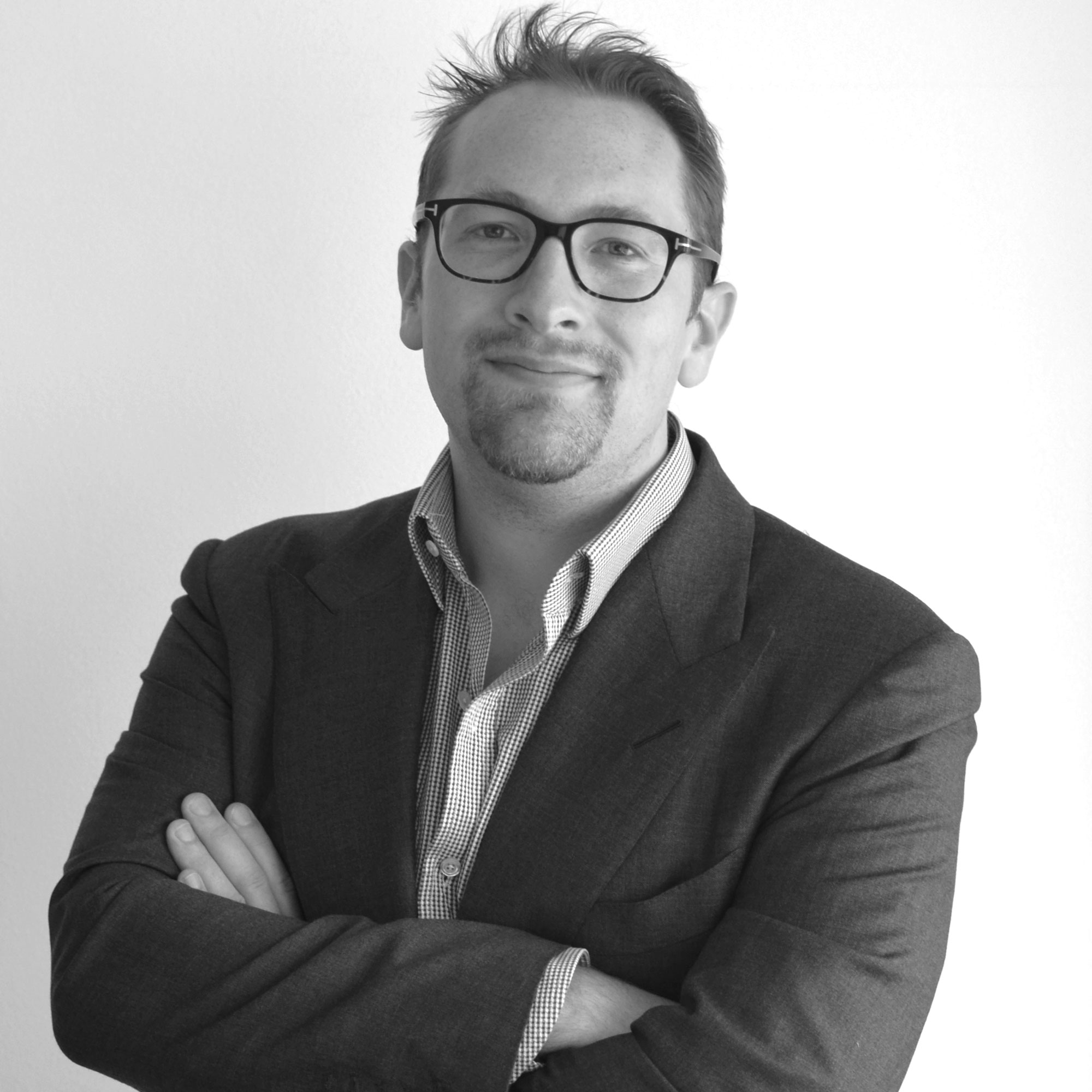
Harris in 2012

Wil Harris (born 20 September 1982) is a British businessman and journalist.

== Career ==
In 2017, Harris became the cofounder and CEO of Entale Media, a podcasting platform backed by Founders Factory. Entale was subsequently backed by DMG Ventures in 2019 and fully acquired by the group in 2022. During that time, Entale won awards for its innovation in the podcast space, including a Webby Award for Best Visual Design in an app.

Harris is chairman of creative agency Hotwol. He was formerly Head of Digital for Condé Nast UK, where he drove digital growth and innovation at the group, including the launch of new video and programmatic ventures.

In 2007, Harris and Justin Gayner founded the multi-channel network ChannelFlip. The company held contracts to produce content with David Mitchell and Ricky Gervais, among others. ChannelFlip was acquired by Elizabeth Murdoch's Shine TV in 2012.

Harris is the former co-founder and editor in chief of Bit-Tech. He is a guest and commentator on technology, having appeared on podcasts including This Week in Tech, DLC and has written for GQ BBC News Online, The Inquirer, and The Register.

Harris became the CEO of Unbound, a crowdfunding publisher in June 2022. He was replaced in January 2025, and Unbound went into administration on 10 March 2025, leaving many of its authors owed thousands of pounds in royalties.
