= LinuxQuestions.org =

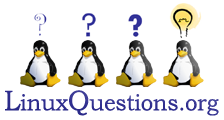
- Website type: Linux support forum
- Available in: English
- Owner: Jeremy Garcia
- Creator: Jeremy Garcia
- Revenue: Adverts from non-registered users
- Website: LinuxQuestions.org
- Commercial: yes
- Registration: required to post not view
- Launched: 2000
- Current status: active

LinuxQuestions.org (commonly abbreviated LQ) is a community-driven, self-help web site for Linux users. As of August 2011, it has over 462,200 registered members. Started in 2000 by Jeremy Garcia, LQ is one of the most popular free software community sites and is usually reputed for helpfulness.

The most popular section of the site are the forums, where Linux users can share their knowledge and experience. Newcomers to the Linux world (often called newbies) can ask questions and Linux experts can offer advice. Topics include security, installation, and networking. Currently available forums fall into the following categories: LinuxQuestions.org, Linux, Enterprise Linux, Other *NIX Forums, Non-*NIX Forums. As of April 2009, the forums had more than 3.5 million posts.

On March 5, 2004, LinuxQuestions.org set up a wiki aimed at building the largest online Linux knowledge base. The software used for this task is MediaWiki.

LQ also has a section where one can download CD/DVD ISO images of Linux installation and Live CDs. Other than the download section and forums LQ also has the following sections:

- Linux Podcast
- LQ Radio
- Linux distributions reviews
- Book reviews
- Linux Tutorials
- Linux hardware compatibility list
- Articles (member written and submitted)
- Linux Bookmarks
- Member Blogs

Despite its growth, it is still essentially run by one person — owner and founder Jeremy Garcia — with help from a team of moderators. LQ is active in the community, often having either a stall or presence at Linux conferences or expositions. These are primarily in the United States, but have also been in the United Kingdom and in Canada.

== See also ==
- List of Internet forums
