= LugRadio =

British podcast about Linux

- Genre: Talk show (Linux, Free and open source software)
- Language: English

Cast and voices
- Hosted by: Final: Jono Bacon, Stuart Langridge, Chris Procter, Adam Sweet; Previous: Stephen Parkes, Matthew Revell, Ade Bradshaw; Guests: Lee "Ranulph" Jordan, Ben Thorp, Ted Haeger, Scott James Remnant, Andrew Lewis, Christian Schaller, Chris Jones, Matt Lee, Barbie

Technical specifications
- Audio format: Ogg Vorbis, MP3

Publication
- Original release: 26 February 2004 – 20 July 2008
- Updates: Fortnightly

Related
- Website: www.lugradio.org

LugRadio was a British podcast on the topic of Linux and events in the free and open source software communities, as well as coverage of technology, digital rights and politics.

The show was launched in 2004 as a result of discussions between several members of the Wolverhampton Linux User Group. After five seasons, on 30 June 2008, LugRadio announced that they would end the show at their convention, LugRadio Live UK 2008.

The show was presented by Jono Bacon, Stuart Langridge, Chris Procter and Adam Sweet. Jono Bacon and Stuart Langridge are the only two presenters who were with the show throughout, with Jono Bacon being the only presenter to appear on every show. Previous regular presenters were Matthew Revell (Seasons 1 – 4), Adrian Bradshaw (Seasons 2 – 4) and Stephen Parkes (Season 1, and the first few shows of Season 2). The show has also featured a number of guest presenters.

Guests have included Ximian co-founder Nat Friedman, Google Open Source program manager Chris DiBona, Sun Head of Open Source Strategy Simon Phipps and Eric Raymond among others.

== History ==
LugRadio was conceived by Jono Bacon and Matthew Revell in 2003. The pair met at Wolverhampton Linux User Group and it was agreed that Stuart Langridge and Stephen Parkes would complete the line-up. The first show, called The Phantom Message, was released on 26 February 2004.

Most releases of the show were licensed under the Creative Commons Attribution Non-Commercial No-Derivatives licence, but shows released after December 2007 are under the Attribution-Share Alike 3.0 Unported licence. An effort was made to relicense earlier content under the same license where possible.

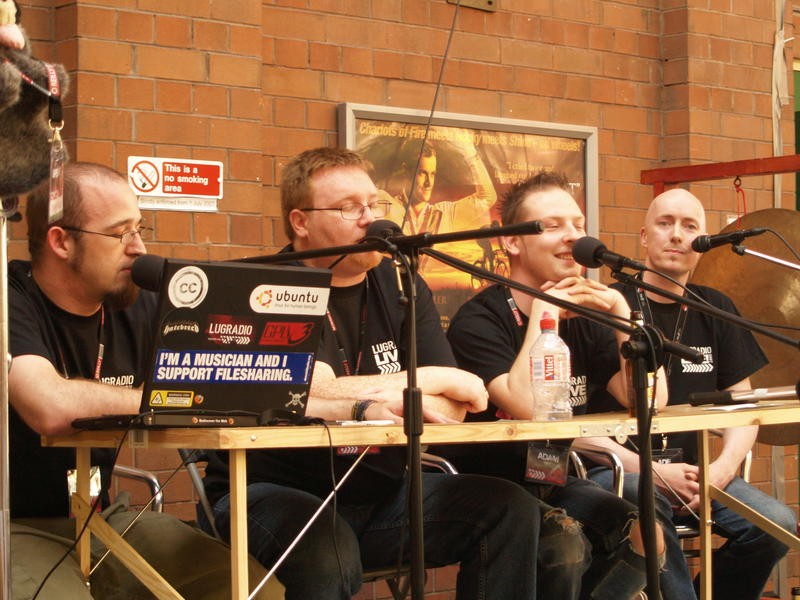

== Media coverage and awards ==
LugRadio received coverage in Linux Format magazine, Linux User and Developer magazine and Linux Magazine as well as online coverage by sites such as Slashdot.

An episode of LugRadio was included on the cover CD of Linux User and Developer magazine.

In 2006, LugRadio won the award for Best Marketing Campaign at the UK Linux and Open Source Awards in London and won the award for Best Linux Podcast in the Christmas 2007 edition of Linux Format magazine.

== LugRadio Live ==
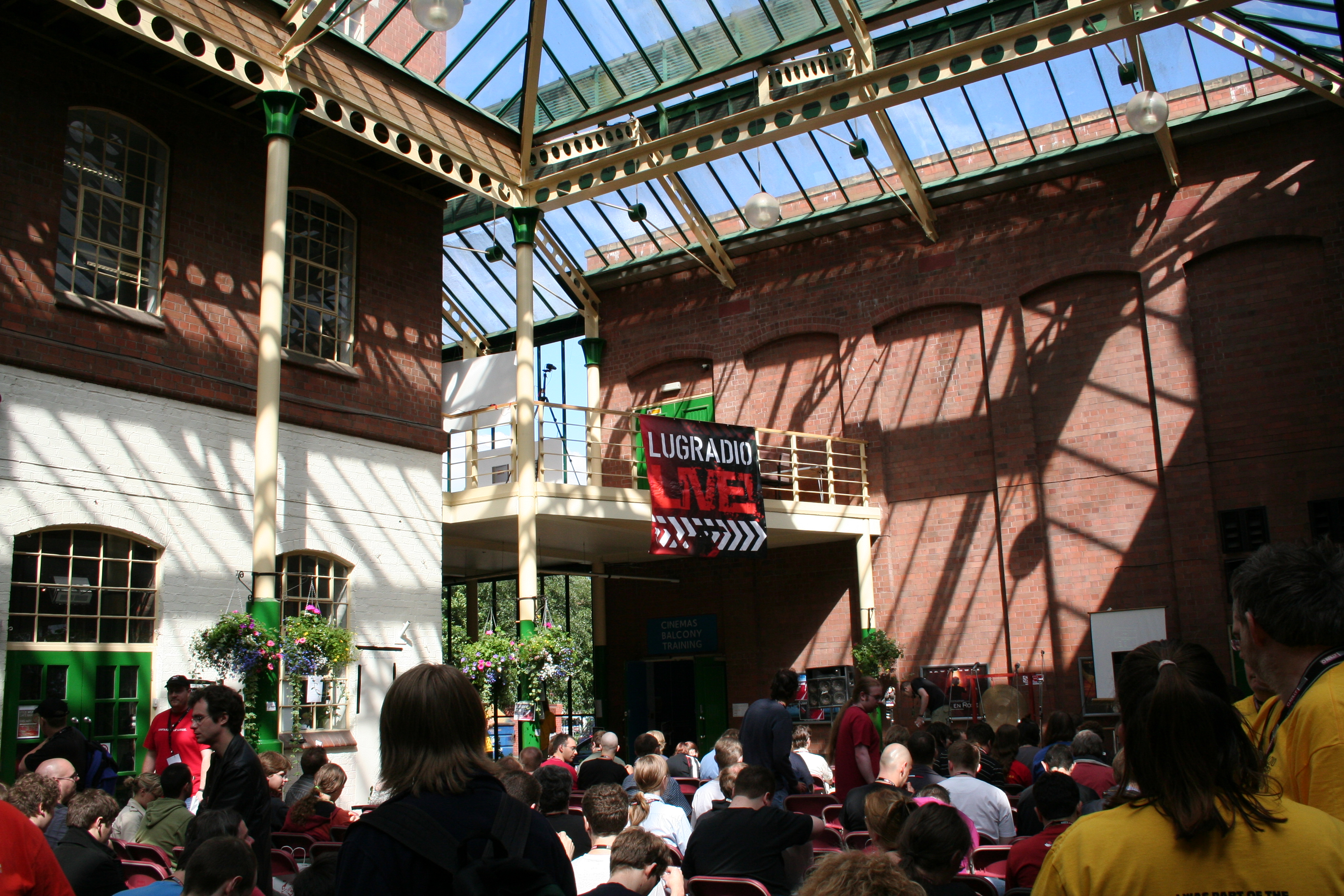
LugRadio Live 2007

LugRadio Live was an annual event organised by the LugRadio team and held in Wolverhampton. It was a Linux, Free Software and Open Source event intended to be fun, without the corporate agenda held by other commercial events. It was first held in 2005 with 250 attendees, 14 speakers — including Mark Shuttleworth, who arrived by helicopter — and 18 exhibitors including Ubuntu, Debian, KDE and O'Reilly.

In 2006 LugRadio Live saw around 400 attendees, over 30 speakers including Michael Meeks and 27 exhibitors including Ubuntu, OpenSolaris, KDE, MythTV, Debian, Fedora and GNOME.

LugRadio Live 2007 took place on 7–8 July 2007 at the Light House Media Centre, Wolverhampton attracting hundreds of attendees from around the world. Speakers included Chris DiBona (Google), Gervase Markham (Mozilla) and a representative from the Department for Communities and Local Government.

LugRadio Live USA 2008 took place on 12–13 April 2008 at The Metreon in San Francisco. The wide selection of speakers included many celebrities including Miguel de Icaza, Robert Love, Ian Murdock, and Jeremy Allison. The show attracted about five hundred Linux enthusiasts from many countries around the world with several travelling from as far as Europe and Australia.

LugRadio Live UK 2008 took place on the weekend of 19 July 2008 at the Light House Media Centre in Wolverhampton.

LugRadio Live 2009 took place on 24 October 2009 at the Newhampton Arts Centre in Wolverhampton.
