= Alex Lindsay (podcaster) =

American computer graphics and video production specialist

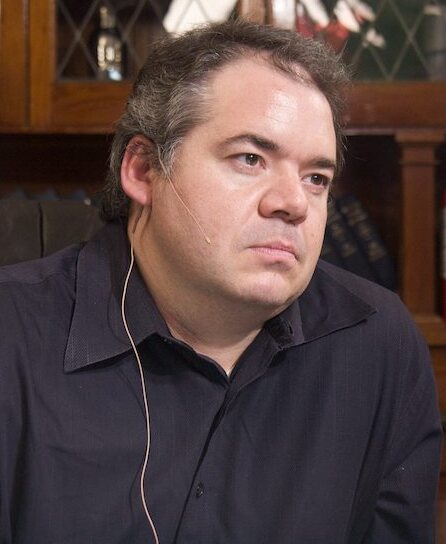
Lindsay in 2008

Alex Ben Lindsay (born July 10, 1970) is an American computer graphics and video production specialist. He is also the founder of the Pixel Corps and dvGarage which were both companies involved with computer graphics, computer animation and video production.

== Background ==
Lindsay spent three years working at Lucasfilm and Industrial Light and Magic on Star Wars: Episode I – The Phantom Menace (1999) and Titan A.E. (2000).

He also played Rum Sleg in The Phantom Menace, for which action figures are available.

He has taught at the Academy of Art and the San Francisco State Multimedia Studies Programs. He has written for 3D Magazine, 3D World and Post. He was a regular guest on the US cable channel TechTV, and has appeared as a guest on G4techTV Canada's television show The Lab with Leo Laporte.

Until late-2025 he was Head of Operations at 090 Media, though in January 2026 he joined Apple in a new full time role.

== Podcasting ==
Lindsay produced the internet show MacBreak, which in 2006 made episodes available online in 1080p, a notably high resolution at the time. He also was a regular participant on MacBreak Weekly, a weekly podcast on the TWiT network, but after joining Apple Inc. in a new work position in January 2026, was replaced as a regular by tech journalist Christina Warren.

He also used to host the Virtual Final Cut Pro X Users Group dedicated to working with Apple Inc.'s non-linear editing system software.

Pre-January 2026, he produced the daily Zoom webinar Office Hours which is a panel discussion about media production technology.
