= Drupal Association =

- Founded: October 16, 2009
- Type: 501(c)(3)
- Fields: Software
- Key people: Heather Rocker (Executive Director)
- Website: https://www.drupal.org/association

The Drupal Association is an educational non-profit organization that tasks itself with fostering and supporting the Drupal software project, the community and its growth. Supported by both individual members and organizations, the Association uses its resources, network and funds to constantly engage in new projects and initiatives to help educate people about Drupal and support the growth of the Drupal project.

The Drupal Association does not control or direct code development of Drupal.

== Mission ==
The Drupal Association fosters and supports the Drupal software project, the community and its growth by: maintaining the hardware and software infrastructure of Drupal.org and other community sites, empowering the Drupal community, protecting the GPL source code of the Drupal project, organizing and promoting worldwide events (see DrupalCon), and communicating the benefits of Drupal.

== History ==
- 2014 - Dries Buytaert filed for US Federal Trademark for the Drupal word mark, in his individual capacity. An Assignment has not been recorded to Drupal VZW, Drupal Association, or Drupalcon, Inc.
- 2020 - As part of the COVID-19 pandemic, the company received between $150,000 and $350,000 in federally backed small business loans from Beneficial State Bank as part of the Paycheck Protection Program. The company stated it would allow them to retain 14 jobs.
