= TWiT.tv =

Podcast network

Coordinates: 38.2764301°N 122.6676119°W

- Country: United States
- Broadcast area: Worldwide, via Internet
- Headquarters: Petaluma, California

Programming
- Language: English

Ownership
- Owner: TWiT LLC

History
- Launched: April 2005
- Founder: Leo Laporte

Links
- Website: TWiT.tv

Availability

Streaming media
- YouTube: Watch Live
- Twitch: Watch Live
- Club TWiT: Sign up today

TWiT.tv is a podcast network that broadcasts technology-focused podcasts, founded by broadcaster and author Leo Laporte in 2005, and run by his wife and company CEO Lisa Laporte. The network began operation in April 2005 with the launch of This Week in Tech. Security Now was the second podcast on the network, debuting in August of that year. As of January 2024, the network hosts 14 podcasts; however, due to declining advertisement sales, some are being discontinued, or are only available with a Club TWiT subscription and the TWiT studio was closed in August 2024. Podcasts include This Week in Tech, Security Now, and MacBreak Weekly.

TWiT founder and owner Leo Laporte, in an October 2009 speech, stated that it grossed revenues of $1.5 million per year, while costs were around $350,000. In November 2014, during an interview with American Public Media's Marketplace Leo Laporte stated that TWiT makes $6 million in ad revenue a year from 5 million TWiT podcasts downloaded each month, mostly in the form of audio, and that 3,000 to 4,000 people watch its live-streamed shows. On March 18, 2015, prior to the filming of This Week in Google, Leo Laporte stated that TWiT expects to make $7 million in revenue in fiscal year 2015, and made "almost" $10 million in revenue in 2016.

TWiT gets its name from its first and flagship podcast, This Week in Tech. The logo design originated from a traditional logic gate symbol of an "AND gate" turned on its side. Voiceovers are provided by Jim Cutler.

== Programming ==
TWiT's podcasts are centered around technology and technology news. They are hosted by journalists with knowledge in their coverage areas.

== Shows ==
The TWiT Network is host to the following shows

Show	Hosts
Hands-On Apple	Mikah Sargent
Hands-On Tech	Mikah Sargent
Hands-On Windows	Paul Thurrott, Richard Campbell
Home Theater Geeks	Scott Wilkinson
iOS Today	Mikah Sargent, Rosemary Orchard
MacBreak Weekly	Leo Laporte, Andy Ihnatko, Jason Snell, Christina Warren
Security Now	Steve Gibson, Leo Laporte
Tech News Weekly	Mikah Sargent
Intelligent Machines	Leo Laporte, Jeff Jarvis, Paris Martineau
This Week in Space	Rod Pyle, Tariq Malik
This Week in Tech	Leo Laporte
Untitled Linux Show	Jonathan Bennett
Windows Weekly	Leo Laporte, Paul Thurrott, Richard Campbell

== Litigation ==
In May 2017, Twitter announced that it would deliver original video content on its platform. Lawyers from TWiT believed this violated a spoken agreement between Leo Laporte and Twitter co-founder Evan Williams made in 2009, and infringed on TWiT's trademark. TWiT tried to informally resolve the trademark issue, and in January 2018 filed a trademark infringement lawsuit against Twitter.

In March 2018, Twitter filed a motion to dismiss. On May 30, 2018, US Magistrate Judge Jaqueline Scott Corley granted Twitters' motion to dismiss the case. The judge found that TWIT's discussions with Twitter "do not support a plausible inference that Twitter agreed to never offer audio or video content under the Twitter brand."

== Awards ==
- This Week in Tech was the recipient of the 2005, 2008, and 2010 People's Choice Podcast Awards in the Technology category and Best Video Podcast in 2009 and 2011.
- Tech News Today was the recipient of the 2012 International Academy of Web Television award for Best News Web Series. It also won the People's Choice Podcast Awards in the Technology category in 2011 and 2013.
- Security Now was the recipient of the 2007 People's Choice Podcast Awards in the Technology category.
- This Week in Computer Hardware, Home Theater Geeks, NSFW, This Week in Tech, MacBreak Weekly, TWiT Live Specials, iPad Today, Tech News Today, The Tech Guy, This Week in Google, and Windows Weekly were named "Best of 2010 in Podcasts" by iTunes Rewind.
- In 2011, This Week in Tech was named "Best Technology Podcast", and TWiT Photo was named "Best New Technology Podcast" by iTunes Rewind.
- In 2017, Triangulation was awarded the first "Best Podcast: Technology" Webby Award for the episode Leo Laporte Talks with Edward Snowden's Lawyer, and Leo Laporte was chosen as an Honoree for "Podcasts: Best Host" by The Webby Awards

== See also ==
- This Week in Tech
