= Leo Laporte =

American technology broadcaster, author, and entrepreneur

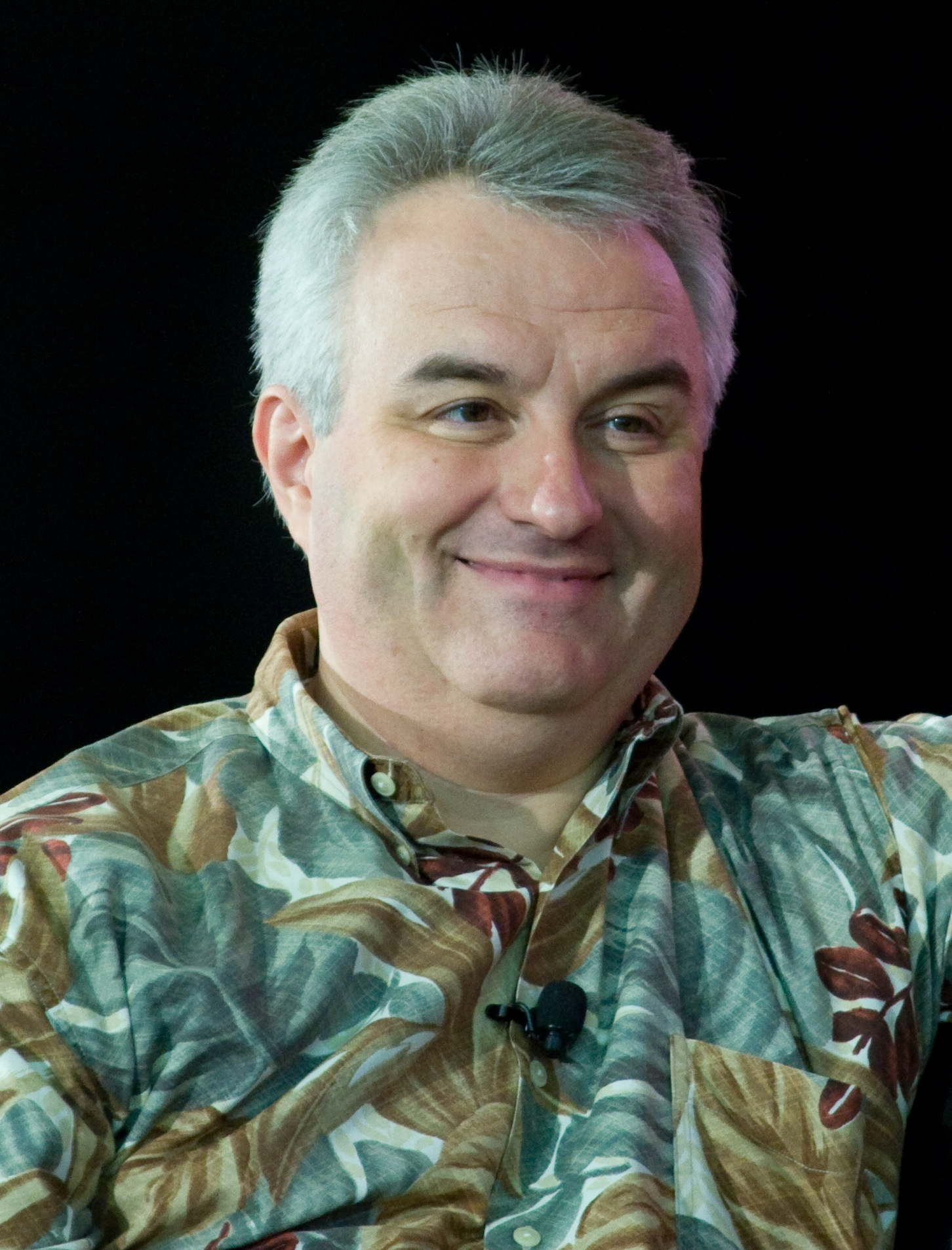
- Laporte pictured in 2007
- Born: November 29, 1956 (age 69); New York City, U.S.
- Occupations: TV and radio presenter; podcaster
- Known for: Founding TWiT.tv
- Notable credits: The Screen Savers (1998–2004); Call for Help (1998–2001; 2003–2007); The Tech Guy (2004-2022); This Week in Tech (since 2005)
- Television: Internet! (PBS), The Site (MSNBC), Call for Help (ZDTV/TechTV), The Screen Savers (ZDTV/TechTV)
- Spouses: Jennifer Laporte (divorced); Lisa Laporte (m. c. 2015)
- Children: Henry Laporte
- Website: leo.fm

Leo Laporte (/ləˈpɔːrt/; born November 29, 1956) is an American technology broadcaster, author, and entrepreneur, best known as the founder and owner of the TWiT.tv (This Week in Tech) podcast network, which he launched in 2005.

Laporte began his technology career in the 1980s as a software author and journalist. In the early 1990s, he hosted the syndicated radio show On Computers, which aired on over 60 stations. Laporte's television career began in the late 1990s when he co-hosted The Site, for which he earned an Emmy in 1997. He joined ZDTV (later TechTV) in 1998, co-hosting The Screen Savers and Call for Help until the network's acquisition by Comcast in 2004. From 2004 to 2022, he hosted the nationally syndicated radio program The Tech Guy, which aired on over 200 stations and focused on consumer technology advice.

== Background ==
Laporte was born in New York City, the son of geologist Leo F. Laporte, and grew up in Providence, Rhode Island. From 1973 to 1976, he studied Chinese history at Yale University before dropping out in his junior year to pursue a career in radio broadcasting, where his early on-air names were Dave Allen and Dan Hayes. He began his association with computers with his first home computer, an Atari 400. By 1984 he owned a Macintosh and wrote a software review for Byte magazine. From 1985 to 1988, he operated one of the first Macintosh-only bulletin board systems, MacQueue.

== Radio and television ==
From December 1977 to May 1998, Laporte hosted newstalk and interview shows on KGO, KSFO, and KNBR in San Francisco. He was a personality DJ on KLOK in San Francisco and San Jose and KMBY in Monterey. Laporte had been a midday, general-interest radio host until the increasing popularity of Rush Limbaugh, after which he created and co-hosted the tech talk radio show On Computers from January 1991 to July 1994. The program was syndicated to over 60 stations nationwide as well as the American Forces Network.

In 1997, Laporte was awarded a Northern California Emmy for his role as Dev Null, a motion capture character on the MSNBC show The Site.

In 1998, Laporte created and co-hosted The Screen Savers, and the original version of Call for Help on the cable and satellite network ZDTV (later TechTV).

Laporte hosted the daily television show The Lab with Leo Laporte, recorded in Vancouver, British Columbia, Canada. The program was formerly known as Call for Help when it was recorded in the US and Toronto, Ontario, Canada. The series aired on G4 Canada, on the HOW TO Channel in Australia, on several of Canada's Citytv affiliates, and on Google Video. On March 5, 2008, Laporte confirmed on net@nite that The Lab with Leo Laporte had been canceled by Rogers Communications. The HOW TO Channel did not air the remaining episodes after it was announced the show had been canceled.

He hosted a weekend technology-oriented talk radio program show titled Leo Laporte: The Tech Guy. The show, started on KFI AM 640 (Los Angeles), was syndicated through Premiere Radio Networks. On November 19, 2022, actor, writer, musician, and comedian Steve Martin called into Laporte's radio show to announce Leo's retirement from The Tech Guy radio show. Laporte's last new radio show was December 18, 2022 with reruns for the remainder of the year. Rich DeMuro later appeared on the show to announce that he would take over in January with a weekly show, recorded on Saturdays, called "Rich On Tech."

Laporte appeared on Friday mornings on KFI with Bill Handel, and previously on such shows as Showbiz Tonight, Live with Kelly, and World News Now.

He holds an amateur radio license, W6TWT.

== Bibliography ==
Laporte has written technology-oriented books including:

- Smith, Gina; — (1 March 1995). 101 Computer Answers You Need To Know. Ziff-Davis Press. ISBN 978-1562763398. LCCN 95159818. OCLC 32516630. OL 873902M – via Internet Archive.
- —; Branwyn, Gareth (1 October 2004). Leo Laporte's Guide to TiVo. Indianapolis, IN: Que Publishing. ISBN 978-0789731951. LCCN 2004107054. OCLC 57086528. OL 3314839M – via Internet Archive.
- —; Stauffer, Todd (8 November 2004). Leo Laporte's 2005 Mac Gadget Guide. Indianapolis, IN: Que Publishing. ISBN 978-0789731746. LCCN 2004107074. OCLC 56658424. OL 3314849M – via Internet Archive.
- —; Stauffer, Todd (1 August 2005). Leo Laporte's Guide to Mac OS X Tiger. Indianapolis, IN: Que Publishing. ISBN 978-0789733931. LCCN 2005922649. OCLC 60320459. OL 8157794M – via Internet Archive.
- —; Soper, Mark Edward (September 1, 2005). Leo Laporte's PC Help Desk. Indianapolis, IN: Que Publishing. ISBN 978-0789733948. LCCN 2005924991. OCLC 62382528. OL 8157795M – via Internet Archive.
- Bacon, Jono (27 August 2009). "Foreword from the First Edition". The Art of Community: Building the New Age of Participation (Theory in Practice). Foreword by Leo Laporte (Second ed.). O'Reilly Media. pp. ix–x. ISBN 978-0596156718. LCCN 2010277242. OCLC 804515247. OL 24194264M – via Internet Archive.

He has published a yearly series of technology almanacs:

- Leo Laporte's Technology Almanac
- Poor Leo's Computer Almanac ISBN 0768654920
- Leo Laporte's 2006 Technology Almanac ISBN 0789733978

Laporte announced in October 2006 that he would not renew his contract with Que Publishing, and had retired from publishing books.

In 2008, Laporte did a voice narration of Andrew Lang's fable The True History of Little Golden-hood from Audible (Amazon), a sponsor.

== Podcasting ==
Laporte owns and operates a podcast network, TWiT.tv with his wife Lisa Laporte. Before the expansion to new facilities in 2011, Laporte said TWiT earned US$1.5 million (equivalent to $2,150,000 in 2025) annually on a production cost of US$350,000 (equivalent to $501,000 in 2025). In a 2012 Reddit posting, he commented that revenue was approaching US$4 million (equivalent to $5,720,000 in 2025). The TWiT studios are located in Petaluma, California, where Laporte lives.
