= Nvision =

Event organized by Nvidia

Nvision, stylized as NVISION, was a stand-alone event in 2008 organized by Nvidia to promote visual computing among enthusiasts and journalists.

The event was mostly centered on Nvidia's own products but offers activities usually found at other types of events: a demoscene event, scientific talks, and programming classes. It has been replaced by the GPU Technology Conference in following years.

The same name was also used for Nvidia's quarterly magazine, published by Future plc. Publication was ceased after the 'Winter 2011' (#7) issue.

== Nvision 08 ==
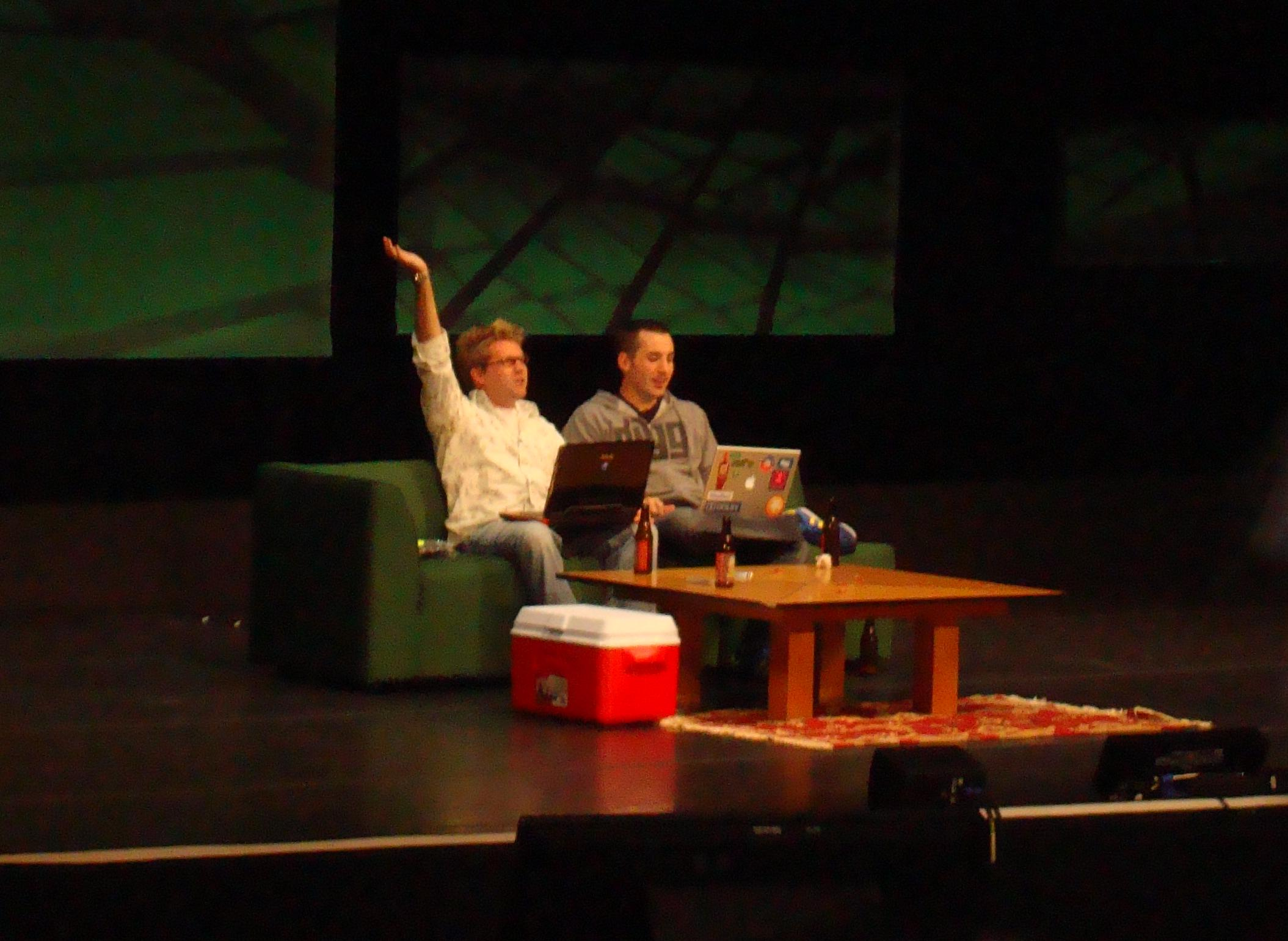
Kevin Rose and Alex Albrecht hosting a live Diggnation show

The first Nvision event, Nvision 08, was held at the San Jose Center for the Performing Arts from August 25 to August 28, 2008 in San Jose, California.

Adam Savage and Jamie Hyneman, of MythBusters fame, demonstrated how GPUs solve specific tasks faster in parallel than they can be executed on general purpose CPUs by painting a Mona Lisa with a massively parallel paint gun.

Guinness World Records was present to officiate the record for the longest continuous LAN party at 36 hours.

Kevin Gee from Microsoft revealed more details publicly about what would be in the next DirectX 11.

Revision3's Kevin Rose and Alex Albrecht were present to host a live Diggnation show.

France-based Games Services was present to host the 2008 Electronic Sports World Cup.
