= Daniel Burka =

Canadian designer

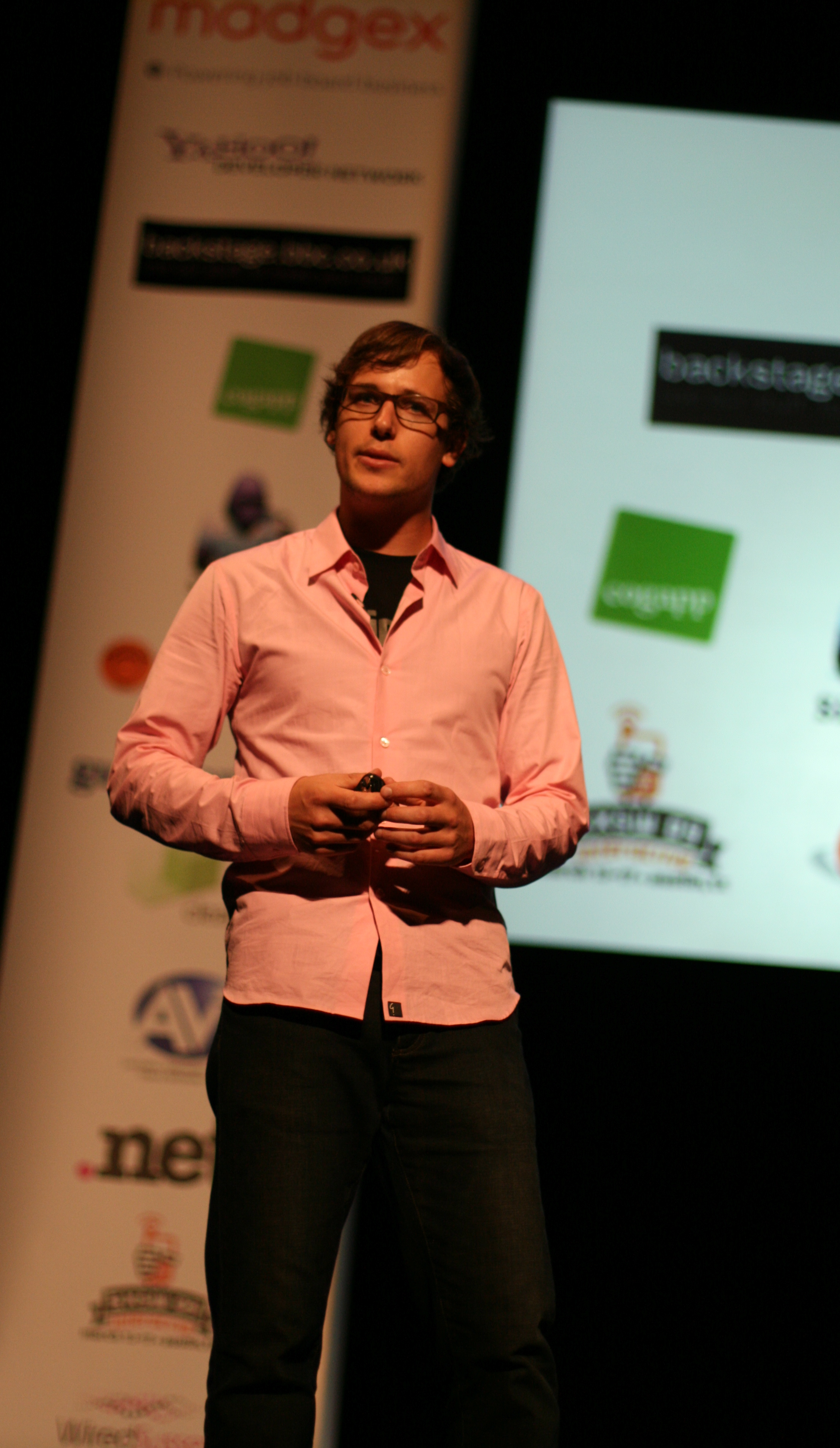
- Daniel Burka
- Born: Daniel Burka; December 17, 1978 (age 46); Canada
- Website: https://danielburka.com

Daniel Burka (born December 17, 1978) is a Canadian designer, creative director, startup founder, and product director. Burka is currently the director of product and design at the health informatics nonprofit Resolve to Save Lives, working on digital design applied to public health. Before becoming a design partner at Google Ventures, Burka shaped early internet products as the creative director of Digg, as the co-founder of Pownce, and as the director of design at Tiny Speck (now Slack). Previously he founded the web design company silverorange, where he worked on the original Firefox logo and visual identity and Mozilla website with fellow designer Jon Hicks.

== Career ==
Burka joined Kevin Rose's company Digg in 2005 and served as head of design for 5 years. In January 2008, Burka co-founded the social networking service Pownce. Pownce was acquired by Six Apart on December 1, 2008, and the site was shut down on December 15, 2008, due to stagnant growth and lack of revenue. In September 2009, Burka announced that he was leaving Digg to join the gaming startup Tiny Speck, started by Flickr co-founder Stewart Butterfield. In April 2011, Burka announced that he was leaving Tiny Speck to join as co-founder of Milk with Kevin Rose and Jeff Hodsdon.

In March 2012 Kevin Rose posted that the Milk team (Daniel Burka, Chris Hutchins, Joshua Lane, and Kevin Rose) was joining Google. Burka was a design partner at GV for 5 years. At GV, Burka contributed to the book called Sprint about the design sprint process, authored by Jake Knapp.

Burka is currently the director of product and design at Tom Frieden's not-for-profit organization Resolve to Save Lives where he works on the Simple.org project. The goal of Resolve to Save Lives is to save 100 million lives from cardiovascular disease by catalyzing evidence-based measures in public health programs.
