= Pownce =

Free social networking and micro-blogging site

- Screenshot Pownce logo and screenshot
- Website type: Micro-blogging and Social network service
- Available in: English
- Owners: Megatechtronium, Inc.
- Creators: Kevin Rose, Leah Culver, Daniel Burka
- Revenue: Paid (pro) option and advertising
- Website: www.pownce.com
- Commercial: Yes
- Registration: Required
- Launched: June 27, 2007
- Current status: Closed

Pownce was a free social networking and micro-blogging site started by Internet entrepreneurs Kevin Rose, Leah Culver, and Daniel Burka. Pownce was centered on sharing messages, files, events, and links with friends. The site launched on June 27, 2007, and was opened to the public on January 22, 2008. On December 1, 2008, Pownce announced that it had been acquired by blogging company Six Apart, and that the service would soon shut down. It was subsequently shut down on December 15, 2008.

== History ==
Its launch, on June 27, 2007, was covered by Wired, Business Week, Webware, and the San Francisco Chronicle, with most of the coverage focusing on Rose, known for his involvement in Digg, Revision3 and TechTV. Due to this media exposure, invitations for Pownce were in high demand and were being sold on sites such as eBay.

On October 30, 2007, Pownce launched their public API. The developers have also created a Pownce API Google Group. Originally, it was primarily for discussing the release of the API, but it later served to gather feedback and help developers. On November 12, 2007 Pownce launched a custom theme editor for Pro users. They also added eight more preset themes for non pro users to use. On December 20, 2007 Pownce launched a mobile version of their service. This version could be accessed from a variety of mobile devices at m.pownce.com.

On December 1, 2008, Pownce announced that they had been acquired and were shutting down the site, due to a lack of revenue, stagnant growth, and an inability to compete with Twitter. Two weeks later, the site was taken offline.

== Comparisons with similar websites ==
Pownce was compared favorably to other websites with similar functionality such as Twitter, and was called a "Twitter on steroids". CNET's Rafe Needleman recommended Pownce over Twitter in a work setting because of its discussion-tracking capabilities.

== Technology ==
Pownce was built on a variation of the LAMP stack: Debian Linux, Apache, MySQL, and Python. The web application was made with Django, an open source web application framework, written in Python. File storage was supported by Amazon S3. The desktop application was written in Flex for Adobe's AIR platform.
