= The Totally Rad Show =

Pop culture video podcast (2007–2012)

- Genre: Video podcast
- Language: English

Cast and voices
- Hosted by: Alex Albrecht; Jeff Cannata; Dan Trachtenberg

Production
- Camera: Mike Gaines
- Production: Mike Gaines
- Length: 10–15 minutes

Technical specifications
- Video format: QuickTime; Flash; WMV; Xvid
- Audio format: MP3

Publication
- Original release: March 27, 2007 – November 26, 2012
- Provider: Revision3
- Updates: Ended

Related
- Website: The Totally Rad Show at the Wayback Machine (archived March 9, 2011)

The Totally Rad Show was a video podcast produced by Team Awesome, LLC and distributed by Revision3. The podcast consisted primarily of reviews and commentary on pop-culture phenomena such as movies, video games, television programs, and comic books. Debuting on March 27, 2007, The Totally Rad Show was hosted by Alex Albrecht, Jeff Cannata, and Dan Trachtenberg, with episodes released once a week. In September 2010, the show switched to a daily release schedule. On November 19, 2012, The Totally Rad Show released an episode titled "A Look Back – Episode 1 (Part 1)" where they announced that the podcast would be coming to an end as of November 26, 2012.

Episodes #1–103 were filmed and edited (#105 was filmed but not edited) by Steve Koncelik. As of episode #104, Steve departed the show, and Mike Gaines took on the filming and editing. In 2008, the show received a People's Voice Webby Award and the "Best Produced" Podcast Award.

On March 27, 2017, they reunited for a 10 year anniversary show.

== Weekly Episodes (2007– 2010) ==
=== Intros ===
==== Original (Episodes 1–104) ====
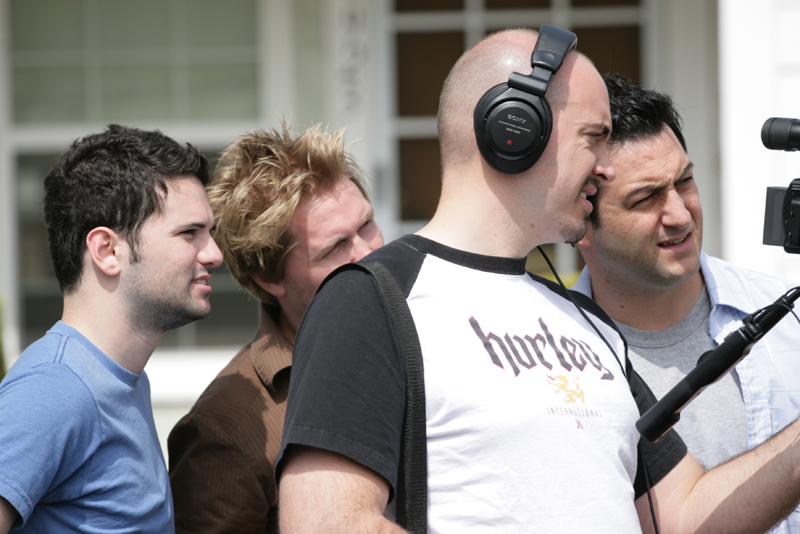
Dan, Alex, Steve, and Jeff working on the intro for Episode 9.

Each of the first 104 episodes of The Totally Rad Show opened with a re-enactment or re-interpretation of a scene from a popular movie or iconic pop-culture moment. For example, the opening scene of the very first podcast was a parody of Raiders of the Lost Ark featuring props such as a can of whipped cream and an American Idol DVD.

==== Missions: Interlude (Episodes 105–130) ====
From episode 105 through 130, the show opened with Alex, Jeff, and Dan having a brief discussion about a topic (usually pop culture or otherwise "geek" related), then being interrupted by someone either fan or production-related giving the hosts a "mission" to complete during the episode. The missions became the list of show topics for that week.

==== Lyrics (Episodes 131–182) ====
Starting with episode 131, the lyrics to the show's theme tune change from week to week, generally reflecting a popular video game or film.

=== Show format ===
A dialogue introduced the subjects discussed on the show, followed by various segments that begin with brief interstitial video shorts, sometimes produced and submitted by fans of the show. The segments varied from episode to episode, usually including reviews, discussions, and current news about the movie, television, video game, and comic book industries.

== Daily episodes (September 2010 – November 2012) ==
During their panel at PAX 2010, TRS announced the switch from a weekly to daily format. The daily version of TRS premiered on September 20, 2010, with a review of the Ben Affleck movie, The Town.

=== Daily format ===
Each week, episodes usually consist of movie and video game reviews, with the other segments rotating in and out depending on current interests and events. Other recurring segments include Television, Comics, Growing Up Rad (some sort of nostalgia-based discussion or activity), Game With a Name (the hosts play a game with a guest star), and the humorous Dan Becomes A Man, during which Alex or Jeff show Dan, the youngest member of the trio, how to do something he has never done before such as smoke a cigar or drive a car with a manual transmission. A newer addition the daily format allows for is recurring game segments where the hosts compete each other on pop culture related games like Versus, Tagline Takedown, Media Mashup, and Charades.

Occasionally, TRS produces special segments based on the hosts' coverage of trade shows, holiday celebrations, or group gaming sessions.

Usually the show wraps up with promotions of sponsors and the hosts answering a Twitter question (formerly This Day in Rad, where they looked at a pop culture or historic event that happened on said day). Friday episodes usually substitute clips of bloopers from that week's filming instead of a Twitter question.

== Production ==
With the exception of on-location segments and show-opening parodies, the Totally Rad Show is filmed in front of a green screen in Alex's garage. This allows the use of Chroma key to superimpose segment-specific backgrounds, gaming sessions, trailers and cut-scenes, as well as images of packaging or covers of the media referenced during the discussion. Although cameraman/editor Mike Gaines (formerly Steve) does not appear onscreen, his voice is sometimes heard, and his presence is felt through creative, artistic or informative contributions to the recorded video.

== Distribution ==
The show was released daily. It is available to download in High Definition QuickTime as well as large and small QuickTime, WMV and XVID. An audio only version is also available in .mp3 format.

== Reception ==
For Wired, Adario Strange gave the show high praise saying, "With 'TRS,' the editing, show pacing, subject matter, editorial wit and overall presentation make this the best weekly video podcast I've seen—period." In one author's experiment of only watching Revision3 content during the 2007–2008 writer's strike, ForeverGeek gave the show a 10 out of 10, saying "you quickly feel like you are friends with the three hosts and that you could hang out with them."

=== Awards ===
Year	Award	Category	Result	Ref.
2008	Webby Award	Online Film & Video – Variety	Won	
2008	Podcast Award	Best Produced	Won	
2009	Webby Award	Video – Variety	Honoree	
2010	Streamy Award	Best Hosted Web Series	Nominated	
2010	Streamy Award	Audience Choice Award	Nominated	

== See also ==
- Diggnation
