= Jay Adelson =

American Internet entrepreneur

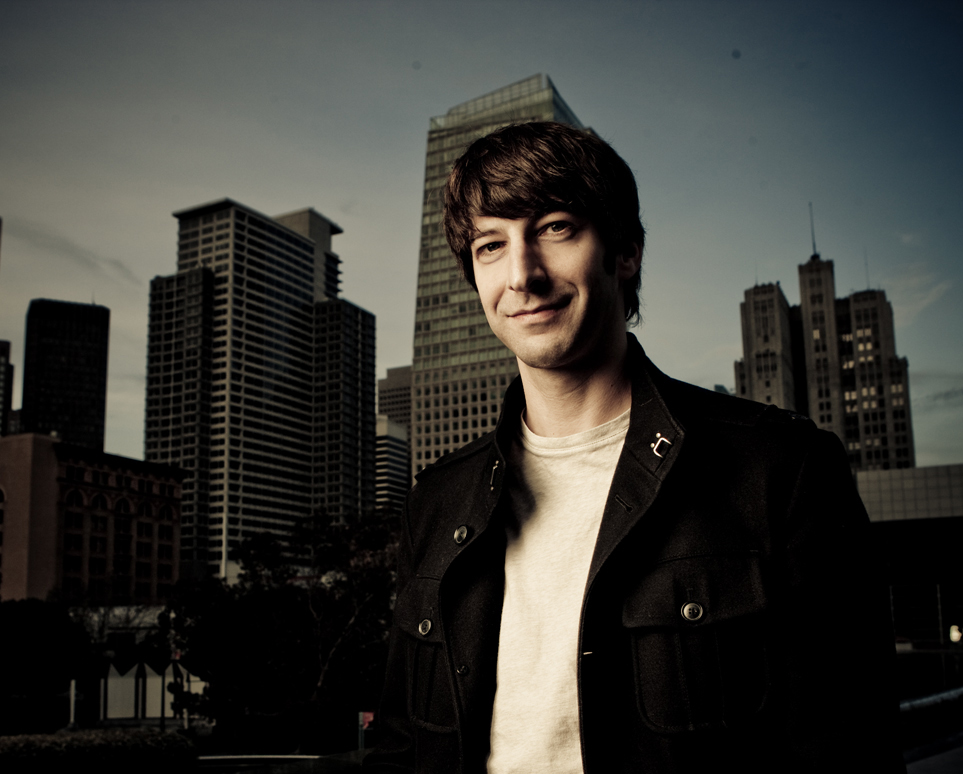
- Adelson in 2011
- Born: Jay Steven Adelson; September 7, 1970 (age 56); Detroit, Michigan, U.S.
- Occupation: Internet entrepreneur
- Known for: Co-founder of Equinix; Former CEO of Digg
- Spouse: Brenda Shea (m. 1996)
- Children: 3

Jay Steven Adelson (born September 7, 1970) is an American Internet entrepreneur. In 2014 Adelson co-founded Center Electric with Andy Smith. In 2013 he founded Opsmatic, a technology company that improves productivity on operations teams. In 2015 Opsmatic was bought by New Relic. Adelson's Internet career includes Netcom, DEC's Palo Alto Internet Exchange, co-founder of Equinix, Revision3 and Digg, and CEO of SimpleGeo, Inc. In 2008, Adelson was named a member of Time Magazine's Top 100 Most Influential People in the World and was listed as a finalist on the same list in 2009.

== Early life ==
Adelson was born in Detroit, Michigan and lived in the suburb Southfield as a child. He attended Cranbrook Kingswood School in Bloomfield Hills, Michigan until 1988. He graduated from Boston University, where he studied Film and Broadcasting along with a concentration in Computer Science, in 1992.

== Career ==
In 1992, Adelson moved to San Rafael, California to pursue a career in post-production sound engineering. After a period of time and world travel, Adelson moved to San Francisco, California in 1993, pursuing instead a career in Internet infrastructure and entrepreneurism.

After his experiences at Equinix and stresses associated with his work with government on cybersecurity following 9/11, Adelson moved to Pawling, New York in June 2004. Adelson commuted from New York to San Francisco to found and operate Revision3 and Digg, eventually moving back to Mill Valley, California in the summer of 2009.

On July 15, 2003, he testified before the United States House Homeland Security Subcommittee on Emerging Threats, Cybersecurity, and Science and Technology, as part of an industry panel on "The Private Sector's Role in Keeping America's Cyberspace Secure."

== Companies ==
=== Netcom ===
In 1993, Adelson joined Netcom, one of the first global ISPs, as an Installation Coordinator, and shortly moved-up to Director of Network Operations. At the time of his departure in 1996, Adelson was responsible for network engineering, operations and customer service. While at Netcom, In February 1995, Adelson was present and managing network operations during the pursuit and capture of former computer hacker Kevin Mitnick by Tsutomu Shimomura.

=== PAIX ===
In late 1996, Adelson worked for Digital Equipment Corporation's Network System Laboratory, specifically Albert M. Avery IV, to build and operate the Palo Alto Internet Exchange (PAIX). It was later renamed the Peering and Internet Exchange after the acquisition by Switch and Data Corporation. Adelson worked alongside Stephen Stuart and Paul Vixie to build a datacenter and services suited for scaling the core of Internet traffic. Adelson's efforts led to the facilities success as an Internet Exchange Point. The datacenter and exchange point remain in operation today in Palo Alto, California. PAIX was later acquired by Equinix in Equinix's October, 2009 acquisition of Switch and Data.

=== Equinix ===
In June 1998, Adelson and Avery left Digital Equipment Corp and founded Equinix, Inc. (briefly Quark Communications). Adelson served as Founder and Chief Technology Officer, responsible for the invention, design and construction of Equinix's datacenters and Internet Exchange Points (known by Equinix as Internet Business Exchanges). Adelson led research and development and was responsible for several patents. Adelson also assisted in the raising of capital including private equity rounds, a high-yield new entrant bond deal, and an initial public offering in August 2000.

=== Revision3 ===
Adelson and Kevin Rose, along with co-founding team that included Ron Gorodetsky, Dan Huard, Keith Harrison and David Prager, founded Revision3 in April 2005. In addition to co-founding and acting as CEO of Digg, Adelson remained CEO and Chairman of the Board of Revision3 for two and a half years, raising two rounds of capital. Jim Louderback was hired as CEO in June 2007. Adelson remains Chairman of the Board of Revision3 presently and hosted his own show called Ask Jay which demystifies the start-up process by providing advice, tips, and answering questions. In May 2012, Revision3 was bought by Discovery Communications.

=== Digg ===
Adelson and Kevin Rose met while Rose was producing an episode of The Screen Savers in 2003 and interviewed Adelson then at Equinix. On December 5, 2004 Kevin Rose, Owen Byrne, Ron Gorodetsky and Adelson started Digg with a $6,000 investment from then 27-year-old Rose. Adelson continued to provide business mentorship throughout the company's first few months of operation, taking the position of CEO in February 2005. Adelson raised the first venture capital round which closed in September 2005. Adelson recruited the initial management team, set up the offices in San Francisco, and commuted from New York as CEO. Adelson raised two more rounds of capital, leading the company through its peak of over forty million unique visitors a month. Adelson left Digg in April, 2010 over disagreements with Rose and the board over the company's direction and leadership.

=== SimpleGeo ===
In November 2010, Adelson assumed the role of CEO of SimpleGeo, Inc. when co-founder Matt Galligan stepped down. SimpleGeo was a location-aware services company for developers of mobile applications. Adelson had been advising the business, largely stemming from a relationship with the company's founder, Joseph Carl Stump, who served as Lead Architect at Digg, Inc. previously. In October 2011 SimpleGeo was purchased by Urban Airship and Adelson resumed his advising role.

=== Opsmatic ===
In early 2013, Adelson co-founded Opsmatic with Mikhail Panchenko and Jim Stoneham. On November 13, 2013, Adelson posted an article on GigaOm describing an alternative stock plan known as the Dynamic Stock Pool. Opsmatic launched to the public in 2014 and Adelson stepped back his active role in order to focus on a new pursuit of a venture capital firm, Center Electric. In November 2015 New Relic Acquired Opsmatic.

=== Center Electric ===
In June 2014, Adelson co-founded Center Electric with Andy Smith. Center Electric is an early-stage technology venture capital firm designed to leverage the growth of the Internet of Things. The company calls itself Center Electric based on the company of the same name founded by Adelson's great-grandfather in Detroit in the 1940s.

== Boards and advisorships ==
Adelson sits on the board of NewAer, Defense.net and Opsmatic. In February 2019, Adelson was appointed to IT service management company Megaport Limited's Board of Directors and named Chair of the company's Innovation Committee. He also advises companies, including Bonusly, Circa, DAV foundation, Founders Den, Ginkgotree, NewsBasis, Katchall, Nuzzel, Ouya, Permanent, Kiip, SOAK, SiiTV, Urban Airship, August, LoveBook, Graphic.ly, Fflick (sold to Google/YouTube in 2011), RoqBot, Plex, and Attachments.me.

== Personal life ==
Adelson met Brenda Shea in May 1994 and they married in June 1996. The couple has three children.
