= Aaker =

Aaker or Åker is a surname. Notable people with the surname include:

- David Aaker (born 1938), American business consultant and author
- Drengman Aaker (1839–1894), American businessman and politician
- Jedediah Aaker (born 1975), American actor
- Jennifer Aaker (born 1967), American social psychiatrist
- Jon Åker (1927–2013), Norwegian hospital manager
- Lars K. Aaker (1825–1895), American businessman, farmer, and politician
- Lee Aaker (1943–2021), American child actor
- Richard Aaker Trythall (1939–2022), American-Italian composer
