= CO-OP (podcast) =

Video game podcast

- Genre: Videogame culture
- Language: English

Cast and voices
- Hosted by: Jason Bertrand; Rob Bowen; Matt Chandronait; Ryan O'Donnell; Jay Frechette; Cesar Quintero

Production
- Direction: Area 5 Media LLC
- Production: Area 5 Media LLC
- Length: Approx 30 mins

Technical specifications
- Video format: MPEG-4 AVC, Flash, WMV, Xvid

Publication
- No. of seasons: 1
- No. of episodes: 6
- Original release: March 9, 2009 – May 18, 2010
- Provider: Revision3
- Updates: Tuesday 6pm EST

Related
- Website: area5 revision3.com/coop

CO-OP was a weekly video podcast produced, written and directed by Area 5 Media LLC and distributed by Revision3. The format of the show usually discusses two or three upcoming or recent video game releases in detail. Instead of using review scores, CO-OP uses a conversation style with industry representatives and video gaming journalists in order to "share in the critique, love and bashing".

The production team is made up of Cesar Quintero, Matt Chandronait, Jay Frechette, Ryan O'Donnell, Jason Bertrand and Rob Bowen. The production company was formed from the team previously responsible for The 1UP Show, a video podcast twice nominated for Min (Media Industry Newsletter) awards. The intro sequence was created by Eden Soto, who also did the intro sequence for Diggnation.

== History ==
At the same time as the sale of 1UP.com from Ziff Davis Media to UGO Networks (owned by the Hearst Corporation), publications such as Electronic Gaming Monthly and The 1UP Show were closed down and the contributing staff laid off. In response to the layoffs the team behind The 1UP Show formed their own production company, naming it Area 5 Media after the final stage in the game Rez. The new company started accepting donations in order to fund a new show, releasing the first episode of CO-OP on January 21, 2009. A strong response by fans resulted in $18,000 of donations through PayPal and over 60,000 viewers.

On March 10, 2009, Revision3 announced that a distribution deal had been signed with Area 5 Media to bring CO-OP to the Revision3 network. At the same time, a new intro sequence by animator Eden Soto and theme song were introduced. Revision3 stated that this represents a "strategic shift" to providing niche content. They also hope that the show will lend itself to further advertising agreements, building on ones established with Electronic Arts and SquareSpace.

Starting on 2/9/2010, CO-OP was streamed live.

The final episode of CO-OP Live aired on April 13, 2010, after only six episodes.

Season 4 Episode 1 was posted to YouTube on October 6, 2010. This introduced a service in which viewers would pay to download new episodes in an attempt to get more revenue from CO-OP. No more Season 4 episodes were produced.

CO-OP-like segments are now a part of the monthly iPad videogame magazine Atomix, which costs a dollar an issue and is available through an app on the iPad app store.

== See also ==
- The 1UP Show
- Revision3
