= Twackle =

Twackle was a Twitter aggregator created by Octagon Sports, launched in late February 2009. Similar to Digg, it incorporates user feedback into its ranking of items.

Twackle was used by several professional sports teams, including

- The Washington Mystics (WNBA)
- The Washington Redskins (NFL)
- The Phoenix Suns (NBA)

== Sources ==
- "How Twackle is changing the way we tweet sports. - ESPN The Magazine". ESPN. 10 March 2009.
- Scibetti, Russell (25 February 2009). "What is Twackle?". The Business of Sports.
- "Mixing the Old and the New: Twackle, "Strat" and Sandlot Day". Huffingtonpost.com. 2010-05-30.
- "Washington Redskins Twackle FAQ". Redskinstwackle.com. Archived from the original on 2010-10-07.
