= RSS editor =

Application software

An RSS editor is a software application for writing and editing RSS feeds offline (i.e. on the local computer). These applications are also often called desktop RSS editors. Usually RSS feeds are automatically generated out of databases from Content Management Systems (CMS). Some other typical sources for RSS feeds are blogs and websites like Digg. However, there are also several, manually edited RSS feeds (mostly with editorial content), which are maintained offline. After the development and creation of such feeds in an RSS editor application, the feed file is usually transmitted via FTP to the web server. Most RSS editors offer a corresponding, integrated functionality for that.
