= Tiki Bar TV =

TV series

Presentation
- Hosted by: Jeff Macpherson (Dr. Tiki); Kevin Gamble (Johnny Johnny); Lara Doucette (Lala)
- Genre: Comedy
- Language: English
- Updates: Monthly
- Length: 6 minutes

Production
- Picture format: NTSC (480i); HDTV (720p) (via membership)
- Video format: .m4v

Publication
- Original release: March 15, 2005 – December 12, 2009

Tiki Bar TV is a video web series, or "vodcast". Each episode features a problem that is rectified by the episode's namesake cocktail, which is scribbled on a prescription pad by Dr. Tiki and "filled" by bartender Johnny Johnny who explains how to make the cocktail. Examples include the Suffering Bastard (episode 2), Fog Cutter (episode 8), Volcano Bowl (episode 11), Boomerang (episode 14), and Blue Hawaiian (episode 25). The drinks did not always follow conventional recipes. Lala is the Tiki Bar's primary denizen who opens each episode with a dance. Most episodes also include a segment called "Tiki Mail," where mail from viewers or disgruntled neighbours is answered, and then ends with outtakes or the cast dancing. Originally shot in an apartment's tiki bar on a low budget, the humorous and heavily ad-libbed show was a creative outlet for its creators Jeff Macpherson and Kevin Gamble.

The show garnered additional attention after being mentioned at Apple's iPod Video launch. Tiki Bar TV was shown in Apple stores worldwide as part of a 6-month promotion in 2006. The first episode was released on iTunes on March 13, 2005, with each episode being approximately 5 minutes in length. The show originated from Vancouver, British Columbia, and has not been updated since Episode 45 (December 12, 2009). It was produced by Tosca Musk and is considered by many to be one of the pioneering video podcasts credited with launching the genre.

== Characters ==
- Doctor Tiki, PhD, MD, USB a.k.a. Reginald Hornstein (Jeff Macpherson) writes the cocktail prescriptions in each episode. His doctorate is in "Tiki," and he is usually wearing a lab coat and stethoscope.
- Johnny Johnny, Mixologist a.k.a. Jonathan J. Jonathan (Kevin Gamble) is the leopard-print fez wearing bartender who makes the cocktails that the Doctor prescribes.
- Lala a.k.a. Beatrice Fastwater (Lara Doucette). She usually wears a provocative dress and broad grin. In episode 10, we learn that she is not as ditzy as she appears; she has an engineering degree and in short time built a self-aware robot capable of nearly fulfilling all of Johnny Johnny’s roles.

The performers go un-credited and unabashed stage names are given. Jeff Macpherson, who plays "Dr. Tiki," introduces himself as actor "Reginald Hornstein," and when "Lala" breaks character, she speaks as actress "Beatrice Fastwater."

Dr. Tiki, Johnny Johnny and Lala in an outtake from episode 9

=== Minor characters ===
- Limey - (Lee Tockar) A lounge lizard in a reptile leather jacket. Introduced in Episode 2 and commonly known as "The Limey Bastard," he is the most frequently appearing minor character.
- Mr. Ambassador - (Gio Corsi) A Cold War era ambassador from the USSR in a red fez who plants a spy camera in the Tiki Bar, unfreezes Lala, and steals Lala's original plans for Drinkbot to build "Robot Box."
- Kip - (Matthew McInnis) A "Guy with Woes" who frequents the bar.
- The Duke of Url - (Francis Rock) A British man on a tour of the Commonwealth.
- Drinkbot - (Colin Beadle) Robot that Lala creates to replace Johnny Johnny, which goes on a rampage after failing to understand the concept of "love."
- Rocket Billy - (Tygh Runyan) A 50s era greaser who delivers the Tiki Mail.
- Space Cadet - (Nicki Clyne) Girl from "The OuterSpace" who comes to the Tiki Bar to learn Earth dance moves.
- The Bastard Illegitimate Son of the Father of the Internet (BISOTFOTI) (Alex Albrecht) The illegitimate son of the father of the internet from episode 20.
- Poindexter (Kevin Rose) Tech Support guy for Tiki Bar TV.

== Merchandise ==
In May 2009, Secret Lab, an independent video game developer based in Hobart, Australia announced the development of a Tiki Bar TV-themed computer game, entitled Day of the Tiki, to be released in Summer 2009. It was then delayed to sometime in 2010.

== Awards ==
In 2009 Tiki Bar TV was nominated for three Streamy Awards: an audience choice award and two craft awards for editing and production design. On March 26, 2009 at the 1st Annual Streamy Craft Awards the show's production designer, Kim Bailey, received the first ever Streamy award for Production Design / Art Direction from the International Academy of Web Television.
