= Fflick =

Defunct film website

fflick
- Website type: Movie Reviews
- Available in: English
- Website: fflick.com
- Registration: Not Required
- Launched: August 2010; 16 years ago
- Current status: Offline (acquired by Google)

fflick was a website devoted to reviews, information, and news of films based on information collected on Twitter. fflick was launched in August 2010 by Kurt Wilms and three other former Digg employees. It was acquired by Google in January 2011 and discontinued.

Similar to how Rotten Tomatoes or Metacritic aggregates movie reviews of new releases, fflick gathered tweets about a particular film in one place. The site categorized tweets into positive or negative reactions. It also allowed users to buy movie tickets, add certain films to their Netflix queues, and retweet other's tweets. You can also check out what certain “influential” users of Twitter think of certain films — a distinction that's made by comparing the number of one's followers versus the number of people they follow.
