= Jon Hicks (designer) =

British graphic designer

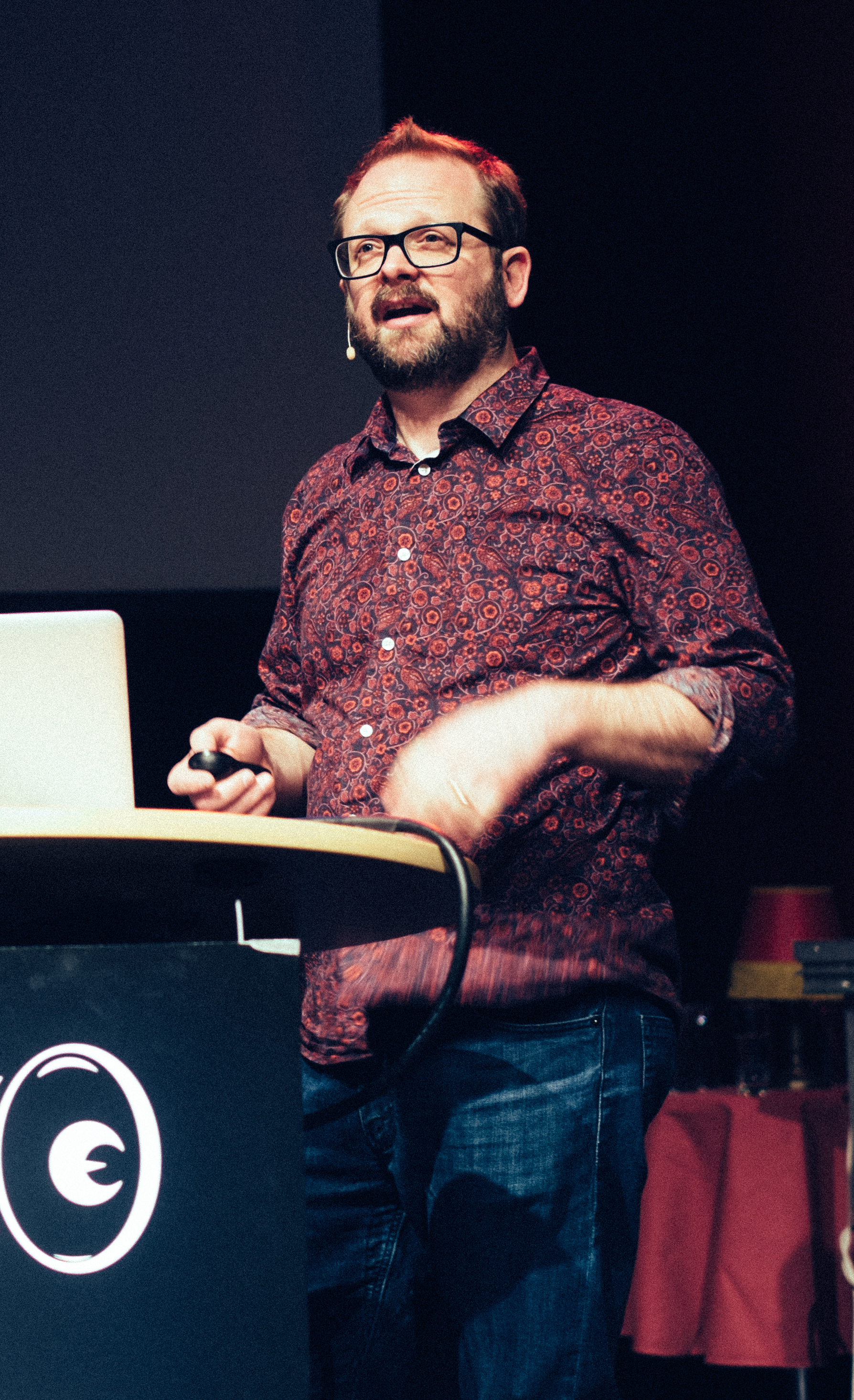
- Born: 28 October 1972 (age 53)
- Occupation: Graphic designer
- Known for: Firefox, Thunderbird, Miro and Mahalo.com logos.

Jon Hicks (born 28 October 1972 in Leamington Spa) is an English designer who owns his own design studio, Hicksdesign. Hicks is best known for rendering the Firefox logo into its final form, based on a concept from Daniel Burka and a sketch from Stephen Desroches. He has worked on numerous other design projects.

== Early life ==
Hicks left school at 16 and studied a BTEC ND in Technical Illustration for two years followed by an HND in wildlife illustration for three years. He then worked as a designer at Coventry City Council before going freelance in 2002 setting up Hicksdesign. Hicksdesign became a partnership in 2007 and a limited company in 2008.

== Internet work ==
Hicks is best known for his work on the Mozilla Firefox and Mozilla Thunderbird logos, has also worked on the Miro, Mahalo.com and MailChimp logos and Camino. Hicks also created a popular diagram of the CSS Box model and a widely used trick to counter the "IE whitespace bug".

In September 2008 he announced that he would work as Senior Designer for Opera Software, improving the Macintosh interface for the company's Opera browser. In February 2010 he wrote in a blog post that after working on a long-term project he wanted to do something different. For that reason he stopped working full-time at Opera and does freelance work again.

According to an interview with Kate Musgrove from the Affinity Spotlight, Hicks said his favorite design done at the time was working on the Spotify icon in 2014. This project combined his love of design with his love of music. In June 2015, Opera Software announced that he will join Opera as Lead Designer for the Desktop team. In July 2016, Hicks announced on his blog that he's finishing working for Opera from August 2016 and is "back in stock".

== Personal life ==
Hicks is married and lives in Oxfordshire. He has two children.

== Rissington Podcast ==
Together with John Oxton, Hicks hosted The Rissington Podcast from September 2007 to February 2009 from the ex-RAF military base where the Hicksdesign studios were based. The podcast's topics are web design (particularly answering listeners' questions), technology and cheese.
