= Digg Patriots =

US activist group

The Digg Patriots were an online US conservative activist group which shared news stories and opinion articles on the then popular left-leaning social media website, Digg. The group started as an invitation-only Yahoo! Groups email list after Digg removed inter-member Instant Messaging. Using a subscription mailing list service to replace Digg "shouts," members of the group shared links, and requested each other to vote up ("digg") or vote down ("bury") other members' submissions. This generated controversy with allegations that the group was "gaming the system".

== Controversy ==
A blog post published on August 5, 2010, on the liberal news organization AlterNet with a companion piece in Guardian.co.uk raised allegations that the Digg Patriots were collaborating to censor articles that they perceived as "liberal" using Digg's "bury" feature, and to have "liberal" Digg members banned from the site by reporting their posts for terms of service violations.

In the AlterNet report, an anonymous blogger using the pseudonym Ole Ole Olson (Digg user "Novenator") wrote that he had conducted a year-long investigation into organized burying of seemingly-liberal articles from Digg. Olson claimed to have evidence proving the existence of a "right wing bury brigade" organized by the Digg Patriots. The Inquirer explained how a bury brigade works, saying "When a story is buried, it is removed from the upcoming section, where it otherwise would usually reside for about 24 hours, and cannot reach the front page. So by doing this, this one group is blocking the ability of the community as a whole to judge the worth of and interest in these stories on their own merits. In essence, they are censoring content at Digg. However Olson, the supposed whistle-blower contradicted himself many times: in August, 2010 he claimed that at best the 'Digg Patriots' could muster about twenty-nine members on a good night, yet at the time Digg was receiving approximately 40,000 hits daily. "

Olson's story was picked up immediately by a number of online news portals, many of which Olson had identified as targets of the Digg Patriots. In a subsequent interview, Olson stated that he had provided over 50 megabytes of screenshots and 2000 emails scraped from the private Yahoo Group to Digg more than a month prior to his blog post, but the company had taken no action. Olson's claims received criticism from one source, with CNET calling them "over-the-top", and claiming that AlterNet "forfeited any claim to balance -- and possibly veracity", asserting that its blog post on the investigation attempted to make a partisan political issue out of what was essentially just internet trolling, the political ideology of the alleged culprits therefore not being relevant. CNET did also admit within the same article that conservatives were probably gaming Digg.

Digg founder Kevin Rose, when asked about the controversy the day the stories were published, commented only that the company is "looking into that." Digg referred to the investigation in an official statement, calling it "an interesting look into the lengths people will go to create the Digg experience they think is best."

The Digg "bury button," a popular feature on the site, had been a source of controversy for several years On 26 August 2010, 20 days after addressing the controversy, Digg upgraded to Version 4, and the bury button was removed; it was restored in a further upgrade on November 3, 2010.
