= Andy Smith (entrepreneur) =

Entrepreneur

- Born: January 9, 1968 (age 58); Princeton, New Jersey
- Education: Pomona College; UCLA Anderson School of Management
- Occupations: Entrepreneur start up advisor author
- Board member of: Glue Network, Café Give, 140 Proof, Everywun
- Spouse: Dr. Jennifer Aaker
- Website: Biography

Andy Smith (born January 9, 1968) is an American entrepreneur, start up advisor, and author. He is best known for The Dragonfly Effect: Quick, Effective, and Powerful Ways To Use Social Media to Drive Social Change, which he wrote with his wife, Dr. Jennifer Aaker. Described by the New Yorker as "the first book to explain what happens at the intersection of social media like Twitter, marketing and psychology", The Dragonfly Effect examines how people use social media to connect and form groups that create global change. In 2014, he partnered with Jay Adelson to form Center Electric, an early-stage technology venture capital firm designed to leverage the growth of the Internet of Things. Center Electric was an outgrowth of Smith and Adelson's passion project, Point Option, which develops next generation devices for in-home use.

== Career ==
In 1997, Smith, who earned a degree in Economics from Pomona College, received an MBA from the UCLA Anderson School of Management. After graduation, he began his career in the high tech industry, working at Dolby Labs, Intel, Analysis Group, Liquid Wit, and Polaroid, among others. Prior to launching Central Electric, Smith founded Vonavona Ventures, which provides early-stage technical and social ventures with guidance in marketing, strategy, and operations.

In 2010, Smith and Aaker authored the book The Dragonfly Effect: Quick, Effective and Powerful Ways to Use Social Media to Drive Social Change. With a title inspired by the dragonfly’s unique ability to propel itself in any direction when its four wings worked in concert, the book examined the manner in which synchronized ideas can be used to create rapid transformations through social media. A literary award winner, The Dragonfly Effect has been translated into over 10 languages. In 2013, along with Barbara McCarthy, Smith and Aaker published, The Power of Stories, a companion to The Dragonfly Effect, which further explored social media through psychological insight and provided a hands-on tool to help companies put the model to work.

Smith has guest lectured at Stanford University, covering topics including social technology, engineering virality, and brand building, with a focus on applying technology to real world problems. He is a board member at Glue Network, Café Give Social, an advisor and/or investor in 140 Proof (social stream advertising), ManCrates, ITapp, and One Family One Meal, among others. Smith has been a featured columnist for the Huffington Post, Psychology Today, FastCoExist, and AMEX OpenForum and has appeared on NBC's Press: Here and Bloomberg TV’s Bloomberg West. Smith is a frequent speaker at conventions and seminars and has spoken at the Web 2.0 summit, SXSW, and GE's Ecomagination Day.

== Bibliography ==
- The Dragonfly Effect: Quick, Effective, and Powerful Ways To Use Social Media to Drive Social Change. With Jennifer Aaker. April 2010. Publisher: Jossey Bass. ISBN 978-0-470-61415-0
- The Power of Stories. With Jennifer Aaker and Barbara McCarthy. April 2013. Publisher: CreateSpace Independent Publishing ISBN 9781484184387
