= Digg Reader =

News aggregator website

- Developer: Digg
- Release: June 26, 2013
- Platform: Web-based, Web browsers, iOS, Android
- Type: News aggregator
- Website: digg.com/reader

Digg Reader was a news aggregator operated by Digg. The reader was released on June 26, 2013 as a response to Google Reader shutting down. The reader was web-based and also had iOS and Android applications as well as a Google Chrome extension. The beta for the reader has received mostly positive reviews. On March 26, 2018, Digg shut down Digg Reader.

== History ==
Digg Reader was created in response to Google Reader shutting down. Andrew McLaughlin, CEO of Digg, saw a blog post in Fall of 2012 speculating that Google Reader was shutting down. He sent a note to one of his friends at Google jokingly offering to buy the reader. McLaughlin was sent a serious reply that said there was nothing to buy. In February 2013, McLaughlin's friend from Google said, referring to Google Reader,"I’m not telling you anything, but we’re not going to keep this thing around forever and maybe you want to have something ready by the end of the year.” When Google announced Google Reader was shutting down on July 1, 2013, Digg announced development of Digg Reader that same night.

Digg officially announced development of the reader on March 13, 2013, instead of their original plan of late 2013, moving the project to the top of their priority list. They promised to simulate the best features of Google Reader while also updating it to fit 2013. Digg Reader initially launched on June 21, 2013 as an invite only service and launched publicly on June 26, 2013. On July 2, 2013, Digg Reader announced they are crawling 7.7 million feeds.

On March 14, 2018, Digg announced that it would be shutting down Digg Reader on March 26, 2018.

=== iOS ===
On June 27, 2013, Digg Reader was integrated into the Digg iOS app in the form of an update. Digg decided not to make the reader a separate app because the company sees Digg.com and Digg Reader as complementary products. Cnet gave the app a 3/5 stating "Digg is a beautiful app that blends social news with RSS subscriptions, but bugs and missing features make it suitable only for the most committed Digg users." The app's current version has a rating of 4.5 out of 5 on iTunes.

The app received an App Store Best of 2013 award from Apple as well as a Best of 2013 award from TechCrunch.

=== Android ===
On August 29, 2013, Digg released an Android app for Digg Reader. Digg says an Android app was the most common request from users. The app has a rating of 3.9 out of 5 on Google Play.

=== Google Chrome ===
On October 9, 2013, Digg released a Google Chrome extension for Digg Reader. The extension has a rating of 4 out of 5 on the Chrome Web Store.

== Reception ==
Early reviews for the beta have been mostly positive. Mashable liked it saying they were "extremely impressed", but criticized its lack of features such as search and tagging. PC Magazine gave it a 4/5 praising its clean design, speed, and free price tag, but criticized its lack of OPML support, the inability to log in with an email address, and required connection to Google. Autostraddle gave it a thumbs up citing its neat and streamlined look, free price tag, and speed, but was disappointed it didn't have a share feature for Facebook or Twitter.

TechCrunch was impressed that Digg was able to produce a functional Google Reader alternative, but said in its current form Digg Reader was not a replacement for Google Reader. Blinklist.com said it is a good way to get the news you want, but lacked a certain appeal when compared to other free apps. MacLife was very critical giving it a 2/5 stating it "just barely accomplishes what its creators set out to do" and "There’s little doubt Digg Reader will improve with time, but out of the gate, it disappoints. Despite the clean user interface, there are too many basic features lacking, especially for the kind of RSS solution that power users depended upon Google Reader to provide."
