= Kung-Fu Magoo =

2010 film

- U.S. DVD cover
- Directed by: Andrés Couturier
- Screenplay by: Emmy Laybourne; Sam Laybourne
- Story by: Emmy Laybourne; Sam Laybourne; Rob Sosin; Bob Mittenthal
- Based on: Mr. Magoo by Millard Kaufman & John Hubley
- Produced by: Kevin Gamble; José C. García de Letona; John Baker
- Starring: Jim Conroy; Dylan Sprouse; Alyson Stoner; Lloyd Floyd; Chris Parnell; Maile Flanagan; Rodger Bumpass; Cole Sprouse; Jim Ward; Kenny Mayne; Tom Kenny
- Edited by: Antonio Gallardo; David Váquez
- Music by: Daniel Ingram; Steffan Andrews
- Production companies: Classic Media; Ánima Estudios; Santo Domingo Films; Motion Toons; IMCINE
- Distributed by: Vivendi Entertainment
- Release date: May 11, 2010
- Running time: 79 minutes
- Countries: United States; Mexico; Canada; Ireland
- Language: English
- Budget: $2.6 million

Kung-Fu Magoo is a 2010 animated action comedy film based on the Mr. Magoo character, created by Millard Kaufman and John Hubley. This film was produced by Classic Media, Ánima Estudios, and Santo Domingo Films. It was also produced by Motion Toons, a new, short-lived animation studio created in conjunction with Ánima Estudios, and Santo Domingo Films. English voice-cast stars Dylan and Cole Sprouse, Alyson Stoner and voice actors Tom Kenny, Rodger Bumpass, Jim Conroy, Chris Parnell, and Maile Flanagan.

The first animated feature featuring Mr. Magoo in more than three decades, and the first U.S.-Mexico co-production for Ánima Estudios, it is written by Emmy Laybourne, Sam Laybourne, Rob Sosin, and Bob Mittenthal and directed by Andrés Couturier.

The film was first released direct-to-DVD in the United States on May 11, 2010, before making its television premiere the following year on Disney XD on February 7, 2011.

== Plot ==
The world's most notorious bad guys are invited to the island fortress of super-villain Tan-Gu (Lloyd Floyd) to compete in an Olympic-style tournament of evil, called the Evilympics. Mr. Quincy Magoo (Jim Conroy) and his 12-year-old nephew Justin (Dylan Sprouse) fight giant robot spiders, ninjas on jet skis, and Tan-Gu's "Beasteen" mutants, as representatives of the anti-evil task force.

== Voice cast ==
- Jim Conroy as Mr. Quincy Magoo, the title character
- Dylan Sprouse as Justin Magoo, Quincy's nephew
- Lloyd Floyd as Tan Gu, the founder of the Evilympics
- Chris Parnell as Cole Fusion, a famous actor/secret agent/good guy who competes at the Evilympics, before deciding that he likes being evil.
- Alyson Stoner as Lorelei Tan Gu, Justin's love interest and daughter of Tan Gu
- Cole Sprouse as Brad Landry, a school bully who picks on Justin
- Rodger Bumpass as General Smith, an army general who plans to launch an attack on the island
- Jim Ward as General Bonkopp, an army general who is against General Smith's launch plan
- Jeff Bennett as Sid, Justin's best friend
- Kenny Mayne as himself
- Tom Kenny as Dr. Malicio
- Maile Flanagan as Orangu-Tammy
- Candi Milo as Gor-Illiana
- Ryan Bollman as Corporal Hayes
- April Stewart as Was-Elizabeth
- Jennifer Hale as Agent L / Leslie Destructo

Additional characters were provided by Wally Wingert, Bob Joles, Fred Travalena, Michael Stanton, Susan Boyajian, and Hope Levy.

== Production ==
=== Animation ===
The film's animation was produced by Ánima Estudios in Mexico, while the additional animation was provided by Studio B Productions (now WildBrain) in Canada, and Boulder Media in Ireland.

== Release ==
The project had an early screening at MIPCOM at Cannes, France, in 2008. On May 11, 2010, the English-language version of the film was released on DVD in the United States through Vivendi Entertainment. The film was also originally set for a theatrical release in Mexico in 2009, distributed by Videocine, but there was no further information regarding this, to date. It instead had its Mexican premiere on Cartoon Network in 2011. The film was dedicated to Alfredo Harp Calderoni, the film's executive producer and son of Mexican businessman, Alfredo Harp Helú, who died after production in 2009.

=== U.S. broadcasting ===
On October 12, 2010, the film was acquired by Disney XD for channel transmission and premiered in the United States on 7 February 2011. Produced in Mexico, this marked the first time Disney XD acquired a Latin American animated production for channel transmission.

== Reception ==
The film was panned by critics. S. Jhoanna Robledo of Common Sense Media gave this film 2 out of 5 stars, saying that "the plot, as it were, is nearly nonsensical, but that has always been Mr. Magoo's charm. Though he wreaks havoc with his obliviousness -- he often walks into a dangerous situation simply because he literally walks into one -- he successfully extricates himself and saves the world in the process. On the face of it, it's a nostalgic trip to cartoon history -- Magoo first [sic] debuted in the late '40s, and the special effects are certainly pre-CGI -- and it's a welcome relief from the relentlessness and inanity of current fare. But if one must be a stickler, it's also kind of mean, what with all the jokes at an elderly person's expense."

=== Ratings ===
When it aired on Disney XD on April 2, 2011, it was viewed by 1.6 million viewers among Kids 6-11 (0.5 million/2 rating). In a recent airing, the film was viewed by 254,000 viewers among ages 2 and over, with a 0.2 household rating.

== Broadcast history ==
As of 2018, Kung-Fu Magoo has been broadcast on the following networks:

Region	Network(s)
Argentina	Cartoon Network
Bangladesh	Duronto Tv
Brazil	Cartoon Network
Canada	Teletoon; Teletoon Retro
Chile	Cartoon Network
Colombia	Cartoon Network
Germany	Disney XD / Disney Cinemagic
Italy	Disney XD
Malaysia	Cartoon Network
Mexico	Canal 5 / Cartoon Network
Philippines	Cartoon Network
(United States) USA	Disney XD / Universal Kids / Netflix / Amazon Prime Video
Venezuela	Cartoon Network
