= Kevin Gamble (netcaster) =

Canadian netcaster (born 1973)

- Born: 14 June 1973 (age 52); Vancouver, British Columbia, Canada
- Other names: Batman, Johnny J Jonathan
- Years active: 15 March 2005-present
- Known for: Comedy, video podcast
- Website: tikibartv.com

Kevin Gamble (born 14 June 1973) is a filmmaker, animation producer, and co-creator/co-star of the internet podcast Tiki Bar TV, in which he plays the role of Johnny Johnny the bartender.

On October 14, 2005, during the Macworld 2005 Keynote presentation (which introduced the new iPod with Video) Steve Jobs showcased Tiki Bar TV to the audience as an example of a "Video Podcast" (which, at that point in time, was a relatively new media format) as something that could be loaded onto the new video iPod using Apple's proprietary iTunes software for no charge.

The next day, Tiki Bar TV moved to the #1 slot in the iTunes Podcast charts, and as such Tiki Bar TV was one of the first user-generated programs to gain worldwide popularity via the iTunes distribution model.

Additionally, the still from Tiki Bar TV (specifically, Gamble's image) appeared on the front webpage of Apple.com, and was composited inside of a video iPod). For approximately one month, Gamble's image remained on the Apple homepage next to pictures of iPods featuring U2's Bono, ABC's Lost and a picture of an audio book of Harry Potter.

Gamble's press mentions & appearances include Wired Magazine, The National Post, Tilzy, Epic-Fu and Tubefilter. Television mentions & appearances include CBC, CTV, G4 Tech TV (Canada) and CBS News and NBC News (United States).

In addition to his work in the new media & podcasting space, Gamble actively works in the children's television & animation arena. He has been the Producer of several Television Series and TV Specials including "Max Steel", "The Scary Godmother Halloween Spooktakular", "George of the Jungle" and "Casper's Scare School". His DVD animated feature credits as Producer include "Kung Fu Magoo" and several of the popular "Veggietales" series (including the most recent DVD in the "Minnesota Cuke" line, which parody the Indiana Jones movie franchise). In November 2009, he was named VP of Development for Disney Television Animation.

On January 27, 2008, Gamble saved a woman who had fallen on the track of a New York City Subway station by lifting her back onto the platform and performing first aid.

He currently resides in Vancouver, British Columbia.
