= Diggnation =

American comedy podcast

- Cover artwork
- Genre: Video podcast (audio version available)
- Language: English

Cast and voices
- Hosted by: Alex Albrecht; Kevin Rose

Music
- Opening theme: Eden Soto

Production
- Length: 1 hour 30 minutes

Technical specifications
- Video format: YouTube
- Audio format: Apple Podcasts, Spotify

Publication
- No. of seasons: 2
- No. of episodes: 341 (S1); 26 (as of Jan 21, 2026)
- Original release: July 1, 2005 – January 18, 2012 (S1)
- Provider: Revision3 (2005-2012); YouTube, Transistor (2024-present)
- Updates: Every few weeks

Related
- Website: www.diggnation.show

Diggnation is a tech-focused humor video podcast hosted by Kevin Rose and Alex Albrecht. Originally broadcast on Revision3, the first episode aired on July 1, 2005 and the last episode on December 30, 2011. This run of video podcasts was one of the most successful early video podcasts.

Following a reunion of Kevin and Alex on The Kevin Rose Show in July 2024, it was decided to reboot Diggnation, with the first new episode of "Diggnation (Rebooted)" being released in September 2024.

== Background ==
Producer David Prager suggested naming the Digg website "Diggnation". Rose decided on the simpler Digg for the website and Diggnation for the podcast.

The intro sequence to the podcast was created by Eden Soto in collaboration with Prager. It was developed over a three-month period, according to Eden Soto's website.

=== Reunion and revival ===
On October 13, 2017, Rose and Albrecht released a "light Diggnation reunion" under the title of "Talking Tech", released within "The Kevin Rose Show" podcast. In the episode, the two hosts confirmed new episodes of "Talking Tech" would be released every 4 to 5 episodes of "The Kevin Rose Show." However, only one follow up episode was released, in 2018.

On July 2, 2024, Alex and Kevin reunited once more on episode 64 of "The Kevin Rose Show," "The Diggnation Reunion." In September 2024 the first episodes of a rebooted "Diggnation v2.0" were released, reviving the show.

== Format ==
The first season of Diggnation usually started with Rose and Albrecht reviewing beverages. These include beer, wine, tea, coffee, and hard liquors such as vodka or whisky. The hosts continue consuming the beverages for the rest of the show. In its original format, Rose and Albrecht then discuss Digg stories from the previous week, with off-topic banter with each other and with Prager and camera operator Glenn McElhose.

In Diggnation (Rebooted), Rose and Albrecht are joined by producer Mauricio Balvanera along with special appearances from Digg CEO Justin Mezzell and other special guests.

== Episodes ==
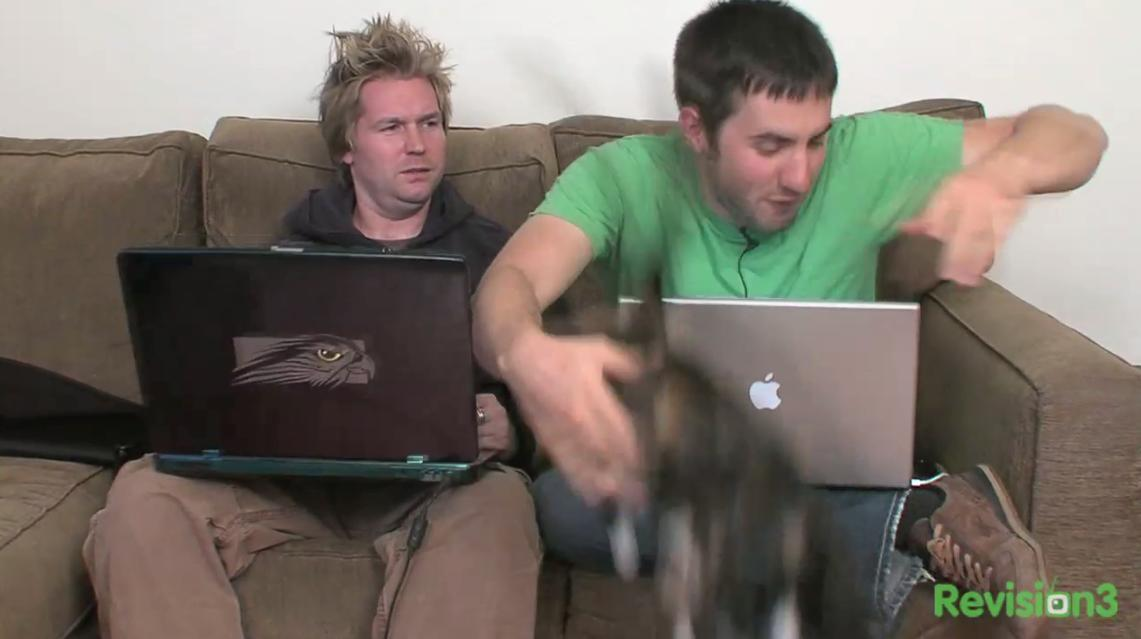
Kevin drops his cat after spilling beer on his couch during the first minutes of episode #123.

The first season of the show began with a short listing of the podcast's current sponsors, followed by a humorous fake advertisement (i.e. Bose's Noise Enhancing Headphones, "Days of our Prager", Cougars: Aged to Perfection, etc.).

After the title video, the hosts introduce themselves, give the filming location, make any relevant announcements, and discuss the drinks they will have during the episode. The beer tasting and beverage aspect of Diggnation is one of the show's unique aspects.

The majority of the episode is dedicated to Rose and Albrecht discussing news items as well as providing personal commentary, anecdotes and unrelated banter. The show's humor is generally vulgar. At the end of the show, Rose and Albrecht mention their sponsors again, read the e-mail from fans, then conclude the show with a seemingly ad-libbed phrase or saying. In later episodes, bigger Digg stories are discussed after the ads, but before the emails. This is keeping in line with most other Revision3 shows.

== Distribution ==
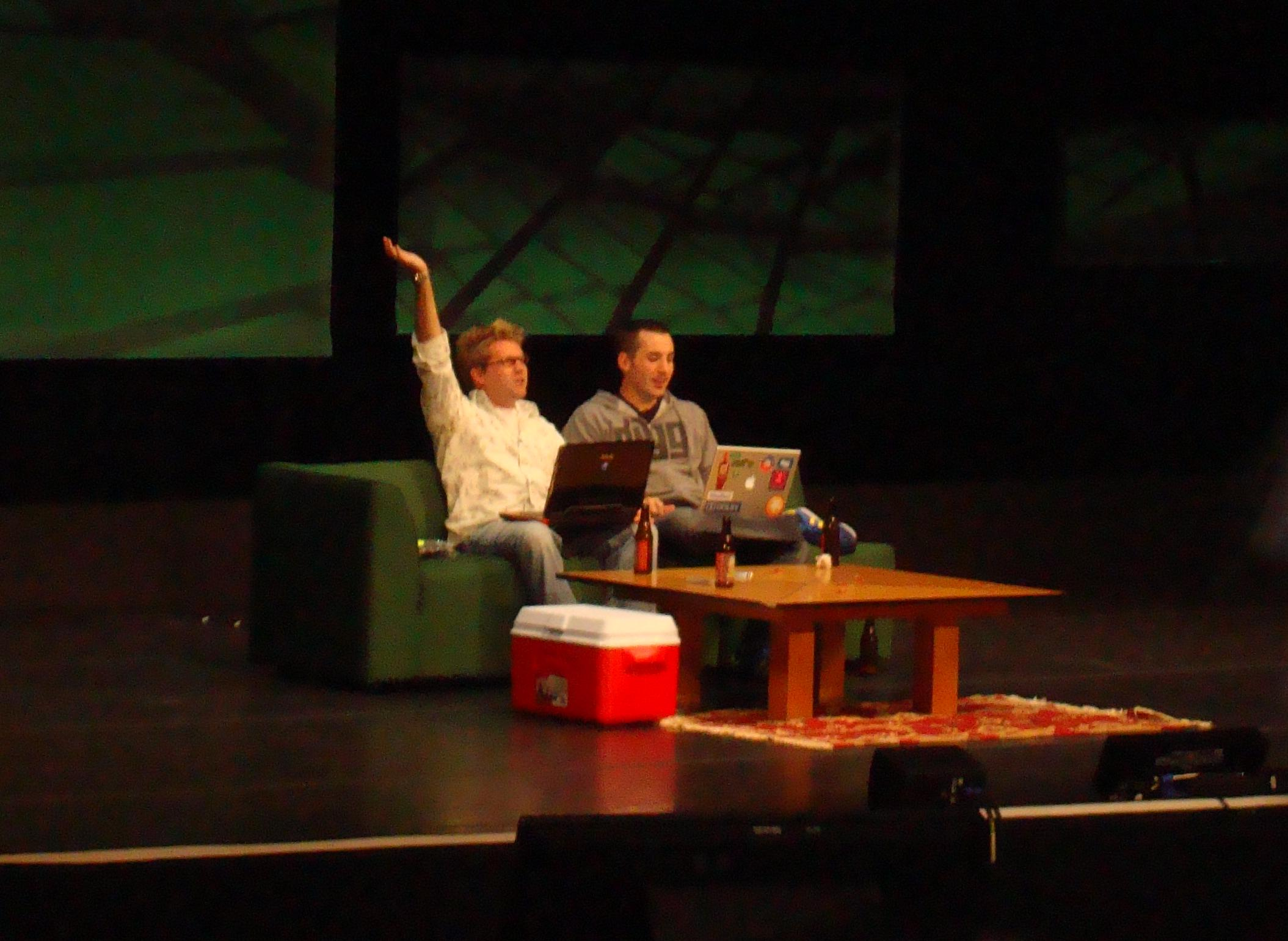
Diggnations live show in San Jose as part of Nvision 08

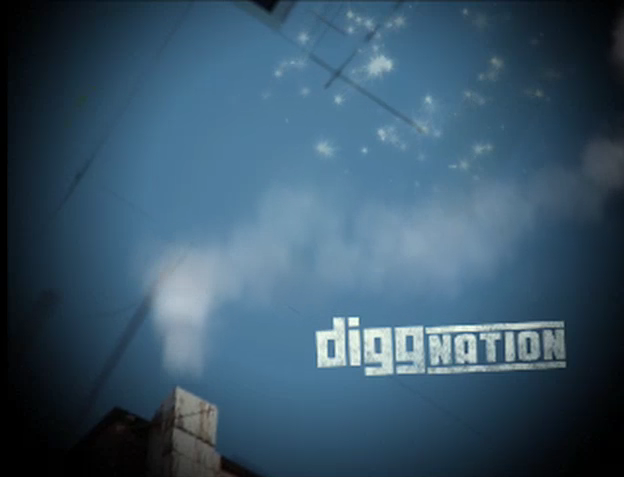
Diggnation logo

Diggnation episodes were released weekly on Wednesdays at 6 PM (EST). Previously, the show was released on Friday at the same time for paid members, and Sunday at 12:01 for everyone. There were an estimated 250,000 regular subscribers to the show during its peak.

BitGravity handled iTunes and TiVo subscribers, downloads from the website, and RSS feeds. Repeats, edited for content, time and profanity, were also seen on Youtoo TV.

Diggnation hosted live shows at CES, SXSW, Reno, Nevada, Macworld, San Francisco, E3, San Diego, Hollywood, London, St. Louis, Amsterdam, San Francisco, Tokyo, Los Angeles, and New York City.

On October 3, 2011, Prager announced that Diggnation would end with its 340th episode. The Diggnation finale was broadcast on December 30, 2011 at The Music Box in Hollywood.

With the relaunch of Diggnation in 2024, the audio version of the feed is distributed by Transistor to Apple Podcasts, Pocket Casts, Overcast, and other listening apps. Video versions of each episode are also being uploaded to the original Diggnation YouTube channel and made available on Spotify.

== Guests ==
Although hosting duties were typically split solely between Rose and Albrecht, a few "third-chair" guests were invited onto the program:

- Episodes 185 and 251: Jimmy Fallon
- Episode 220: Adam Savage
- Episode 231: John Hodgman

Other guests included Chris Hansen, Adam Carolla, Ashton Kutcher, WWE Diva Candice Michelle, Gary Vaynerchuk, Rachel Maddow, Leo Laporte, Robert Rodriguez and Tony Hawk.

Diggnation (rebooted) has also featured special guests:

- Episode 3: Glenn McElhose
- Episode 11: Jason Calacanis, Chris Sacca, Tim Ferriss, and Alexis Ohanian
- Episode 13: Doctor Tiki and Lala of Tiki Bar TV
- Episode 14: Digg Advisor Jayci Hayes

== Awards ==
- 2006: Podcast Award for best technology podcast.
- 2007: Best in 2007 Podcast from iTunes.
- 2008: People's Voice Winner for the Technology in Online Film and Video at the Webby Awards.
- 2009: Streamy Award for Best Hosted Web Series (nomination)
- 2010: Streamy Award for Best Hosted Web Series (won)

== Other shows ==
A spin-off show, The Digg Reel ran from January 2008 to September 2010, and was originally hosted by Jessica Corbin, followed by Andrew Bancroft. The show featured the week's top user submitted videos in comparison to Diggnation's primary focus on news articles. Both were produced by Revision3.
