= Jennifer Aaker =

American psychologist, author, and professor

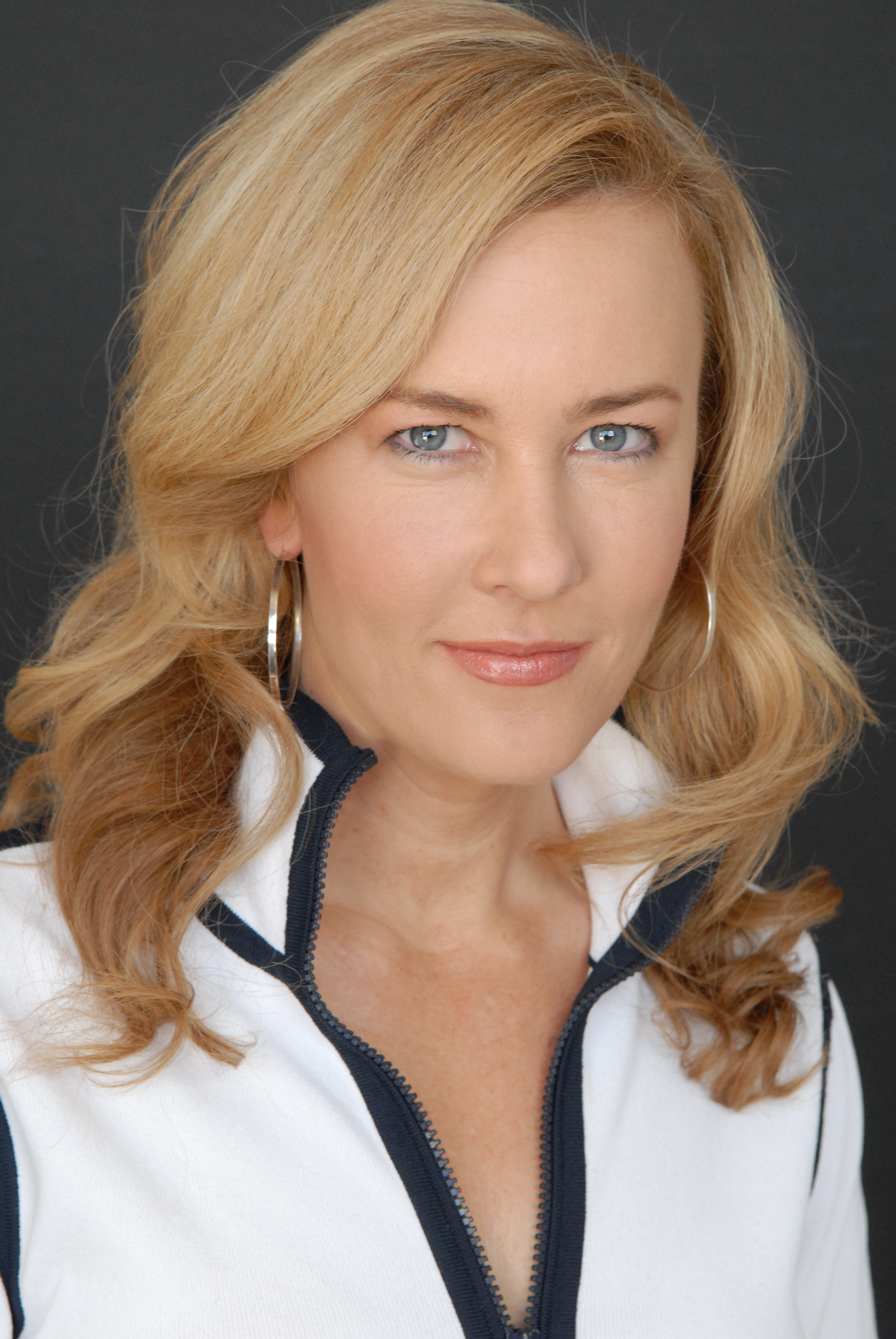
- Born: January 15, 1967 (age 59); Palo Alto, California, US
- Education: University of California, Berkeley; Stanford Graduate School of Business
- Occupations: Author, behavioural scientist, Stanford business school professor
- Board member of: Accompani; Brit + Co; California Casualty; Codexis; Decarbonization + Acquisition Corp; Eat. Learn. Play. Foundation; Pixlee; Your Story
- Spouse: Andy Smith
- Father: David Aaker
- Website: https://www.gsb.stanford.edu/faculty-research/faculty/jennifer-lynn-aaker

Jennifer Aaker (born January 15, 1967) is an American behavioural scientist and the General Atlantic Professor and Coulter Family Fellow at the Stanford Graduate School of Business. Her research focuses on the relationship between time, money, and happiness. Aaker also focuses on the transmission of ideas through social networks, the power of story in decision making, and how to build global brands across cultures. She has received the Distinguished Scientific Achievement Award from the Society for Consumer Psychology and the Stanford Distinguished Teaching Award.

== Early life and education ==
Aaker was born in Palo Alto, California, to Kay Aaker and David Aaker, a marketing professor and brand consultant. Aaker attended the University of California, Berkeley, where she studied under social psychologist Philip E. Tetlock and Nobel Prize winner Daniel Kahneman, receiving a Bachelor of Arts in Psychology in 1989. In 1990, Aaker began doctoral studies at Stanford Graduate School of Business, earning a PhD in marketing with a minor in psychology in 1995. Her dissertation on brand personality led to the publication of academic papers in Journal of Marketing Research and Journal of Consumer Research.

== Career ==
Aaker began her academic career in 1995 as an assistant professor at the UCLA Anderson School of Management. In 1999, she returned to the Stanford Graduate School of Business (GSB) as an assistant professor, was promoted to associate professor in 2001, and earned a full professorship in 2004. In 2005, Aaker was named the General Atlantic Professor and Coulter Family Fellow, Stanford GSB. Her work has been published in scholarly journals in psychology and marketing and has been highlighted in The Economist, The New York Times, The Wall Street Journal, The Washington Post, BusinessWeek, Forbes, NPR, CBS MoneyWatch, Inc., and Science. She serves as an advisory board member for several private and public companies.

In 2010, Aaker and her husband, startup advisor Andy Smith, wrote The Dragonfly Effect: Quick, Effective and Powerful Ways to Use Social Media to Drive Social Change.

Aaker and her students also founded 100K Cheeks, an organization dedicated to registering 100,000 South Asian donors in the National Bone Marrow Registry. In addition to using social networks, Aaker ran the first ever cheek swab in India. As a result of these efforts, 100K Cheeks registered more than 115,000 potential donors.

In 2021, Aaker published Humor, Seriously: Why Humor Is A Secret Weapon in Business and Life with co-author Naomi Bagdonas.

== Books ==
- Aaker, Jennifer Lynn; Bagdonas, Naomi (February 2, 2021). Humor, Seriously: Why Humor is a Secret Weapon in Business and Life and How Anyone Can Harness It Even You (first ed.). New York: Penguin Random House. ISBN 9780593135280. OCLC 1157576080.
- Aaker, Jennifer; Smith, Andy (September 2010). The Dragonfly Effect: Quick, Effective, and Powerful Ways To Use Social Media to Drive Social Change. Jossey-Bass. ISBN 978-0-470-61415-0.
- Smith, Andrew; McCarthy, Barbara; Aaker, Jennifer (April 2013). Dragonfly Effect Workbook: The Power of Stories. CreateSpace. ISBN 978-1-4841-8438-7.
- Aaker, Jennifer (November 2013). "Text". Keep Calm, Play Hard: One Player's Journey in New York City. By Smith, Cooper. CreateSpace. ISBN 978-1494278342.
- Aaker, Jennifer (December 2013). "Text". Tea Sloane's Adventure: A Sparkly Tale of Whimsy and Meaning Found in NYC. By Smith, Tea Sloane. CreateSpace. ISBN 9781494471064.
- Aaker, Jennifer (December 2013). "Text". Devon Made It: One Boy's Journey in NYC. By Smith, Devon. CreateSpace. ISBN 9781494400811.

== Selected publications ==
- Huang, Szu-Chi; Aaker; Jennifer (October 2019). "It's the Journey, Not the Destination: How Metaphor Drives Growth After Goal Attainment". Journal of Personality and Social Psychology. 117 (4): 697–720. doi:10.1037/pspa0000164. PMID 31233318. S2CID 195357095.
- Vohs, Kathleen; Aaker, Jennifer; Catapano, Rhia (April 2019). "It's Not Going to Be That Fun: Negative Experiences Can Add Meaning to Life". Current Opinion in Psychology. 26: 11–14. doi:10.1016/j.copsyc.2018.04.014. PMID 29704755. S2CID 19093036.
- Aaker, David; Aaker, Jennifer (May 1, 2016). "What Are Your Signature Stories?". California Management Review. 58 (3): 49–65. doi:10.1525/cmr.2016.58.3.49. S2CID 113550557.
- Baumeister, Roy F.; Vohs, Kathleen D.; Aaker, Jennifer; Garbinsky, Emily N. (2013). "Some Key Differences between a Happy Life and a Meaningful Life". Journal of Positive Psychology. 8 (6): 505–516. doi:10.1080/17439760.2013.830764. S2CID 11271686.
- How Happiness Impacts Choice (2012), Mogilner, Aaker and Kamvar, JCR
- Awe Expands People's Perception of Time and Enhances Well-Being (2012), Rudd, Vohs, and Aaker, Psychological Science.
- If Money Doesn't Make You Happy, Consider Time (2011), Aaker, Rudd, and Mogilner, JCP
- The Shifting Meaning of Happiness (2010) Mogilner, Kamvar and Aaker, SPPS
- Non-Profits Are Seen as Warm and For-Profits as Competent (2010), Aaker, Vohs and Mogilner, JCR
- The Time versus Money Effect (2009), Mogilner and Aaker, JCR
- The Happiness of Giving: The Time-Ask Effect (2008), Liu and Aaker, JCR
- When Good Brands Do Bad (2004), Aaker, Fournier, and Brasel, JCR
- Can Mixed Emotions Peacefully Co-Exist? (2002), Williams and Aaker, JCR
- Consumption Symbols as Carriers of Culture (2001), Aaker, Benet-Martínez, and Garolera, JPSP
- Dimensions of Brand Personality (1997), Aaker, JMR

== See also ==
- Design thinking
- Customer engagement
