= PAIX =

Internet exchange point

Palo Alto Internet eXchange

General information
- Type: Internet exchange
- Location: 529 Bryant Street / Palo Alto, California / United States
- Coordinates: 37.445709°N 122.160957°W
- Year built: 1920s

PAIX, the Palo Alto Internet eXchange, was a neutral Internet exchange point.

PAIX began operations in 1996 as the Palo Alto Internet Exchange in Palo Alto, California, and was owned and operated by Digital Equipment Corporation. In its early days, it used a DELNI as its interconnection infrastructure.

Originally founded in the 1920s as a telephone switching office, by the 1990s it was a "spare bit of office space" in which Digital decided to establish an internet exchange. Digital had hoped to grow the internet and resolve overcrowding at MAE-East, and, in doing so, sell more of its GIGASwitch networking equipment to carriers. In 1998, when Digital was sold to Compaq, PAIX was sold off. Today, it is owned by Equinix.
