= Jeff Macpherson =

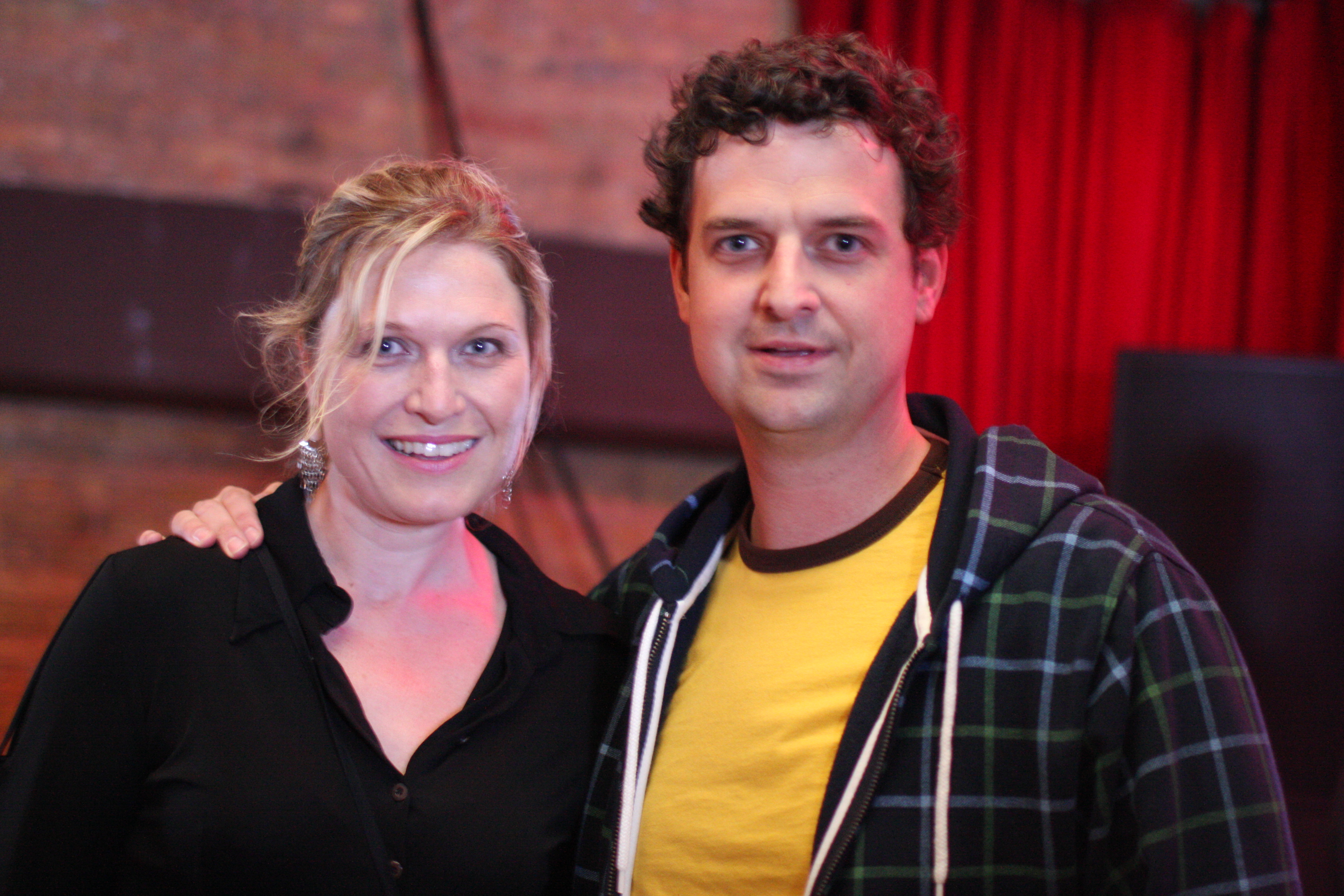
- Jeff Macpherson (right) with Tosca Musk, producer of TikiBarTV, in 2008
- Born: 3 October 1973 (age 53); Vancouver, British Columbia, Canada
- Other names: Characters: Doctor Tiki, Reginald Hornstein
- Years active: 15 March 2005 – present
- Known for: Comedy, Video podcast
- Website: Tiki Bar TV, RocketChicken, CodeRunner

Jeff Macpherson (born 3 October 1973) is a Canadian filmmaker and video game developer. He is the creator of the web series Tiki Bar TV, co-founder of the gaming company RocketChicken Interactive, Inc. (which produces the game CodeRunner) and co-founder of the startup Motive.io.

On October 14, 2005, during the Macworld 2005 Keynote presentation (which introduced the new iPod with Video) Steve Jobs showcased Tiki Bar TV to the audience as an example of a "Video Podcast" (which, at that point in time, was a relatively new media format) as something that could be loaded onto the new video iPod using Apple's proprietary iTunes software for no charge. The next day, Tiki Bar TV moved to the #1 slot in the iTunes Podcast charts, and as such, Tiki Bar TV was one of the first user generated programs to gain worldwide popularity via the iTunes distribution model.

Prior to Tiki Bar TV, Macpherson was a producer of music videos and television commercials (Toyota, Hyundai, and LG). He was also a writer on two feature films for First Look Home Entertainment and directed the feature, Come Together (2001 Vancouver International Film Festival, New York International Independent Film Festival).

In 2006, Macpherson spoke at the annual conference of the Canadian Film and Television Producers Association on the subject of video podcasts and webseries. He has been featured in Wired magazine, The National Post, CPU Magazine, Times.com, Businessweek, G4's Attack of the Show!, CBC's The National, and CBS News. In July 2006, Macpherson was profiled in Forbes magazine Celebrity100 Issue as "one of the first breakout stars in the world of Internet television".

In 2009, Macpherson founded RocketChicken Interactive, Inc. with former Electronic Arts and Microsoft employees and shipped the game CodeRunner in November 2011.
