= David Aaker =

American economist (born 1938)

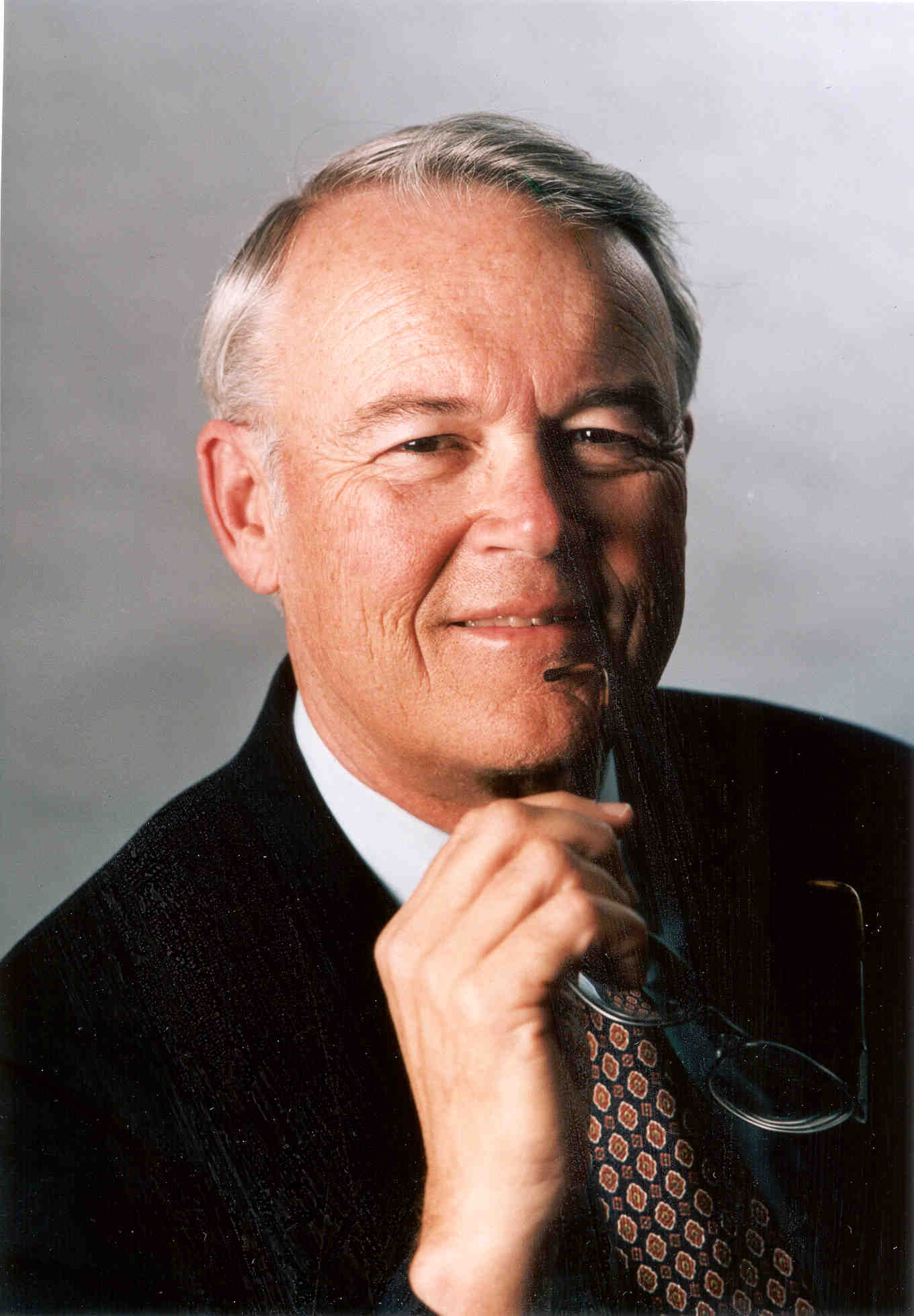
- Born: David Allen Aaker; February 11, 1938 (age 88); Fargo, North Dakota, U.S.
- Occupations: Vice Chairman at Prophet, consultant, author
- Known for: Brand strategy
- Children: Jennifer Aaker

David Allen Aaker (born February 11, 1938) is an American organizational theorist, consultant and Professor Emeritus at the University of California, Berkeley's Haas School of Business, a specialist in marketing with a focus on brand strategy. He serves as Vice Chairman of the San Francisco-based growth consulting company Prophet.

== Education ==
Aaker received his SB in Management from the MIT Sloan School of Management, then his MA in Statistics and PhD in Business Administration at Stanford University.

== Career ==
He is the E.T. Grether Professor Emeritus of Marketing Strategy at the Haas School of Business and the vice chairman of Prophet, a global brand and marketing consultancy firm, and an advisor to Dentsu, a Japanese advertising agency.

He has been awarded three career awards for contributions to the science of marketing: The Paul D. Converse Award, The Vijay Mahajan Award, and The Buck Weaver Award. Aaker was inducted into the New York American Marketing Association's Hall of Fame in 2015.

Aaker has won the award for "best article" in the California Management Review and in the Journal of Marketing (twice). His book, Brand Relevance: Making Competitors Irrelevant, was named among the "Ten Marketing Books You Should Have Read" by Advertising Age in 2011 and named one of the top 3 marketing books of the year by Strategy and Business. Aaker also has a regular column in American Marketing Association's Marketing News called "Aaker on Branding".

Aaker was one of the eleven people included in the 2007 book Conversations with Marketing Masters.

== Work ==
=== Aaker Model ===
Aaker is the creator of the Aaker Model, a marketing model that views brand equity as a combination of brand awareness, brand loyalty, and brand associations. The model outlines the necessity of developing a brand identity, which is a unique set of brand associations representing what the brand stands for and offers to customers an aspiring brand image.

Aaker primarily sees brand identity as consisting of 8–12 elements which fall under four perspectives:

- Brand as Product – consists of product scope, product attributes, quality or value of the product, uses, users and country of origin.
- Brand as Organisation – consists of organizational attributes and local workings versus global activities.
- Brand as Person – consists of brand personality and customer-brand relationships.
- Brand as Symbol – consists of audio and visual imagery, metaphorical symbols and brand heritage.

Aaker first introduced the model in his book Building Strong Brands (1996).

== Publications ==
Aaker is the author of more than 100 articles and 14 books on marketing and branding.

- 1991. Managing Brand Equity, second edition 2009 ISBN 1439188386
- 1996. Building Strong Brands ISBN 1471104389
- 2001. Developing Business Strategies ISBN 0471064114
- 2000. (with Erich Jochimsthaler) Brand Leadership: The Next Level of the Brand Revolution ISBN 1471104370
- 2004. Brand Portfolio Strategy: Creating Relevance, Differentiation, Energy, Leverage, and Clarity ISBN 1439188831
- 2005. From Fargo to the World of Brands: My Story So Far ISBN 1587364956
- 2007. Strategic Market Management ISBN 0471415723
- 2008. Spanning Silos: The New CMO Imperative ISBN 1422163687
- 2010. Brand Relevance: Making Competitors Irrelevant, Jossey-Bass ISBN 0470922591
- 2014. "Aaker on Branding", Morgan James Publishing, ISBN 978-1614488323
- 2018. "Creating Signature Stories Morgan James Publishing, ISBN 9781683506119
- 2020. "Owning Game-Changing Subcategories" Morgan James Publishing, ISBN 9781642798906
- 2023. "The Future of Purpose-driven Branding" Morgan James Publishing, ISBN 9781631959882
- 2024. "Aaker on Branding 2nd Ed." Morgan James Publishing, ISBN 9781636986654
