= Revision3 =

Web television network

- Type: Subsidiary
- Industry: Entertainment
- Founded: Los Angeles, California; 2005; 21 years ago
- Founder: Jay Adelson; David Prager; Kevin Rose
- Defunct: March 31, 2017; 9 years ago
- Fate: Folded into Seeker
- Headquarters: San Francisco, California, United States
- Key people: Jay Adelson (CEO); Patrick Norton (Managing editor)
- Parent: Discovery Digital Networks (2012–2016)

Revision3 was a San Francisco–based multi-channel television network that created, produced and distributed streaming television shows on niche topics. Founded in 2005, it operated as a subsidiary of Discovery Digital Networks since 2012. The network produced technology and gaming oriented programming in tandem with traditional comedic, political, DIY, and movie-related content. On March 31, 2017, Discovery Communications closed the website.

== History ==
The company was founded in Los Angeles, California, by Jay Adelson, Kevin Rose and David Prager in April 2005. Dan Huard, Keith Harrison, and Ron Gorodetzky were also involved. Most of them were previously employees of the television network TechTV.

Show development began in July 2003 with a podcast series called thebroken, a videozine related to computer hacking featuring Rose and Huard. After TechTV merged with G4 and removed most of its technology related programming, Rose and Huard were inspired to create a new series, Systm, in May 2005, which is geared toward "the common geek". Rose left his job as a host of the G4 series Attack of the Show (formerly The Screen Savers) on May 27, 2005, to work full-time for Revision3 Corporation. The popular show Diggnation, also starring Rose, followed in July 2005, forming the first three shows of the new network. Alex Albrecht joined Revision3 on August 5, 2005, to co-host Diggnation with Rose and contribute to other projects while Prager focused on production and business development.

It was announced on July 10, 2007, that Jim Louderback would become the new CEO of the Revision3 Corporation. He previously worked as editor-in-chief for PC Magazine, a publication of Ziff Davis. He was followed by Patrick Norton in August 2007, who worked at Ziff Davis as 'head of podcasts' and host of the IPTV show DL.TV. At Revision3, he was Managing Editor and the co-host of Systm, Tekzilla, and HD Nation. At DL.TV, he was replaced by Roger Chang who in turn left DL.TV and Ziff Davis in December 2007 to join Revision3. Chang has joined Norton as co-producer of Systm and Tekzilla. All three had previously worked at TechTV.

On April 9, 2008, Revision3 announced that Veronica Belmont would be joining the Revision3 staff as co-host of Tekzilla. On April 21, 2008, on the 47th episode of Systm, it was announced that Chief Engineer and co-host David Randolph had left for another job outside of Revision3. On June 6, 2008, CEO Jim Louderback cancelled the show Social Brew after only four episodes. Previous to the announcement Revision3 employee Neha Tiwari was let go without notice.

In September 2008, Revision3 started Revision3 Beta, a "talent-farming" sub-network of unofficial shows headed by Martin Sargent.

On June 16, 2009, Patrick Norton announced that Systm would no longer be a weekly show, instead becoming segments within his other show, Tekzilla. He also announced that he would be launching a new show in July called HD Nation, which will be a show all about HD and Home Theatre. It will be co-hosted by Robert Heron who was a co-host on DL.TV, with Patrick Norton, and then remained host for 23 months after Norton left.

On October 10, 2010, Revision3 launched a show from the popular gaming website Destructoid, which recaps the latest news in video games 3 times a week in studio starring employees Max Scoville and Tara Long. On August 25, 2011, Past host of Bytejacker Anthony Carboni started a video game review show called "New Challenger" where other reviewers are pitted against Anthony's review, whether it be from a live guest or sourced from other popular websites. They subsequently started Rev3Games, a centralised channel for this and short bonus content.

On March 13, 2011, Revision3 announced a partnership with Gawker Media which would bring its most popular websites to video podcasting. This started with Lifehacker, a show showing small tips to improve your life. This was followed up a year later on April 13, 2012 by io9 with a Tekzilla-like show called "We Come from the Future", where the editors of io9 discuss the latest news in science and sci-fi. It ran for 32 episodes and ended November 16, 2012. On 11 August 2011, Jay Adelson (founder of Revision3) started a show responding to questions for entrepreneurial, company and business advice called "Ask Jay". Diggnation announced that it would stop production of episodes from the end of 2011, which caused massive uproar. As consolation for this, production star Glenn McElhose started his own show called "Toasted Donut" on November 15, 2011, where he experiments with different formats. The last episode went ahead live at the Music Box on December 30, 2011, skipping to episode #420 for a 2-parter.

On May 3, 2012, Discovery Communications announced that it had entered into an agreement to acquire Revision3. The transaction closed on June 1, 2012.

== Shows ==
=== Diggnation ===
Diggnation was a weekly video podcast, airing from 2005 to 2011. Hosted by Kevin Rose and Alex Albrecht, the show centered on casual discussion of news items posted to the social news aggregator Digg (of which Rose was a co-founder).

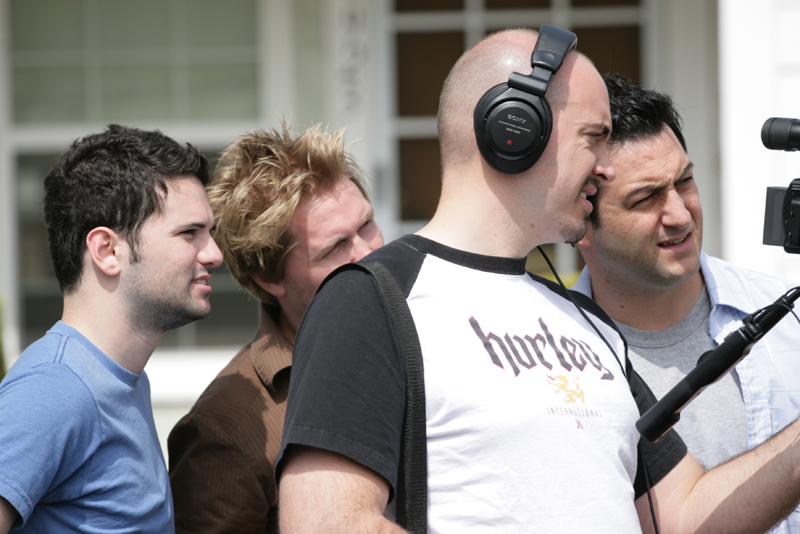
The Totally Rad Show in production

=== The Totally Rad Show ===
The Totally Rad Show was a weekly, later turned daily, video podcast produced by Team Awesome, LLC and distributed by Revision3. TRS consisted primarily of reviews and commentary on pop-culture phenomena such as movies, video games, television programs, and comic books. Hosted by Alex Albrecht, Jeff Cannata, and Dan Trachtenberg, the show ran between 2007 and 2012. In 2008, the show received a People's Voice Webby Award and the "Best Produced" Podcast Award.

=== Tekzilla ===
Tekzilla Logo

Tekzilla was an American video podcast on the Revision3 network (Tekzilla was released every Tuesday). It was hosted by Patrick Norton and Shannon Morse, with Roger Chang (who also acts as the show's producer) as a frequent guest host. For the first 14 episodes of Tekzilla, Patrick's co-host was Jessica Corbin, who made a guest appearance on episode 16 confirming she has left the show. In November 2013, Veronica Belmont left the show. She had been a host on Tekzilla since 2008. Shannon Morse became the new host. On November 25, 2014, Tekzilla aired for the final time. Starting in January 2015, Patrick Norton and Shannon Morse went on to create and host TekThing, funded by Patreon and recorded in the Hak5 studio.

For a few weeks in 2008, Revision3 broadcast Tekzilla live; this was stopped for unknown reasons. However, PA Serafina was quoted on the forums for saying, "There's details and red tape we still need to figure out. I'll keep you updated". In more recent episodes viewers were urged to upload video questions on YouTube; building on this Roger Chang mentioned during one of the 2008 live shows that he thought having live Skype calls would be a good addition to the show. However, now that live shows have ceased this never happened.

Veronica Belmont on the new Spring 2009 onwards set

Since Spring 2009, Tekzilla has had a change of set, as pictured to the left. This includes a new area with a cityscape with red sunrays (similar to the Tekzilla logo) behind it. In addition, the old faux brick wall has been painted white and has had various other cosmetic changes from the 2007-2009 set. The set has two Vizio televisions – on Tekzilla Daily they are used to show screenshots, on the main show they are mostly used to show the Tekzilla logo and occasionally the output of a monitor. Since January 2009, the Tekzilla set has occupied the space previously used by Internet Superstar, a previous Revision3 show.

Tekzilla Daily Tip, formerly Tekzilla Daily, was a daily videocast made by the cast and crew of Tekzilla, originally starring Patrick Norton and later starring Veronica Belmont with Norton occasionally filling in for Belmont. Episodes were generally 1 minute to 3 minutes long. Tips are usually broken down and include various categories; Windows, Mac OS, Firefox, iTunes, and occasionally other topics. The videocast ended on September 12, 2013, with an announcement by Belmont.

On November 16, 2010, Tekzilla's producers announced that the show would be expanded to two full episodes per week, with HD Nation becoming part of Tekzilla and its host Robert Heron joining as a third presenter.

=== CO-OP ===
CO-OP was a weekly podcast show about games - it released in 2009, and ended in 2010.

=== AppJudgment ===
AppJudgment was a web show produced by Revision3 that focused on reviewing and exploring mobile apps across various platforms, including iOS, Android, and BlackBerry. It provided tech enthusiasts with updates on the latest app trends, in-depth reviews, and user-friendly recommendations.

The show was hosted by many different hosts from the Revision 3 team such as Jackie Talbot, Mauricio Balvanera, Anthony Carboni, Annie Gaus and Stephanie Chu using the same short format from the Tekzilla Daily Tip and the same set that was used by Tekzilla

The show gained popularity through its YouTube channel, which reached over 57,000 subscribers and nearly 20 million views. Its engaging format and expert analysis made it a go-to source for anyone interested in mobile technology.

== See also ==
- Digg
- TechTV
- TWiT.tv
- Web series
- Streaming television
- Multi Channel Network
- Cost Per Mille
- Cost Per Impression
- YouTube
- List of YouTube personalities
- List of multi-channel networks
