= Alex Albrecht =

American actor

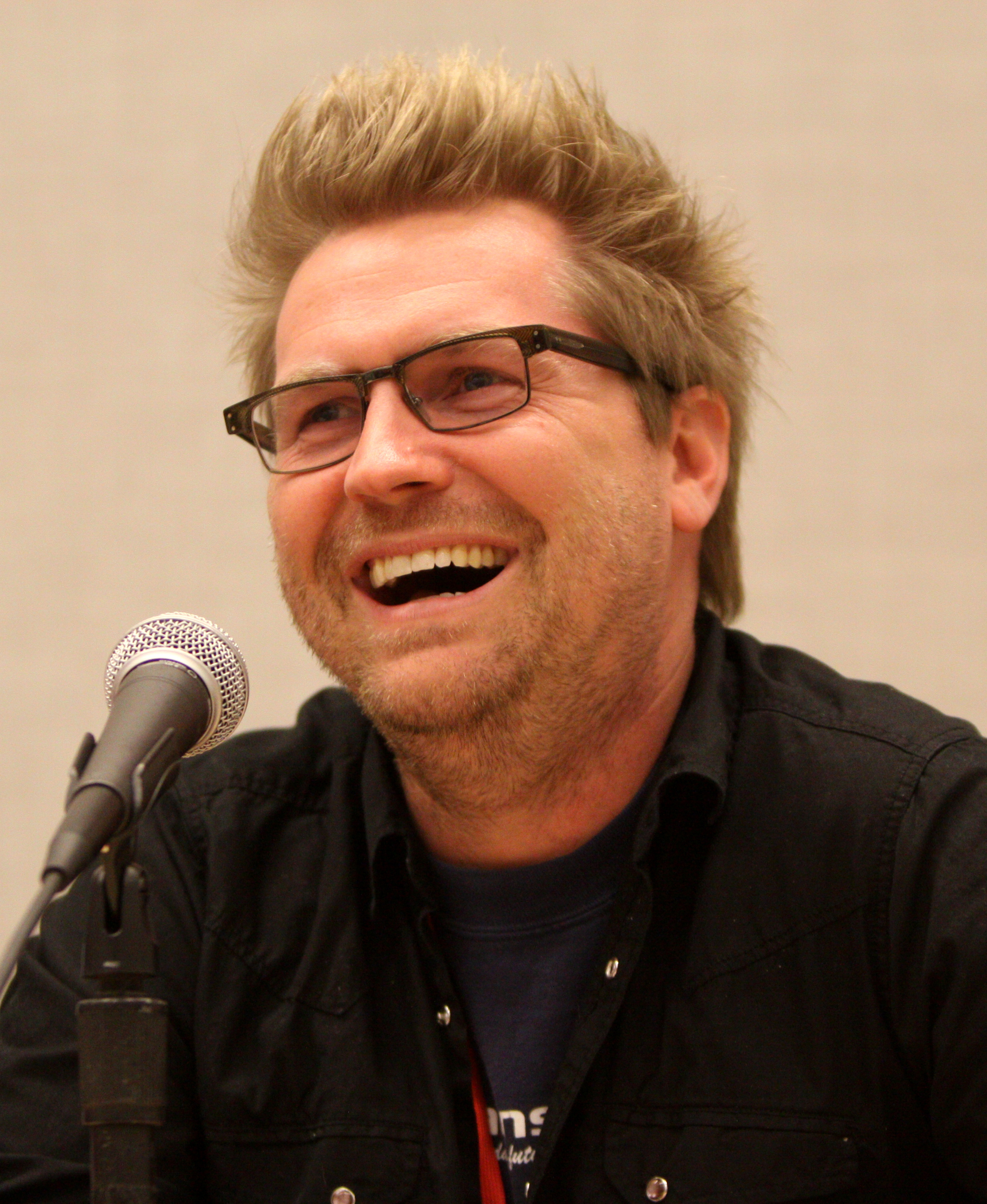
- Albrecht in Phoenix, Arizona in May 2011
- Born: August 14, 1976 (age 50); Beverly Hills, California
- Occupations: Podcast host; actor; director; writer
- Spouse: Heather Stewart (m. 2013)
- Website: www.alexalbrecht.com

Alexander Jennings Albrecht (born August 14, 1976) is an American television personality, actor and podcaster. He is known for co-hosting the former G4techTV television program The Screen Savers, an hour-long computer and technology variety show, as well as the weekly podcast Diggnation and the weekday podcast The Totally Rad Show on the Revision3 network. On July 15, 2008, he released his new podcast/website Project Lore, all about World of Warcraft. Albrecht has expressed a penchant for dressing up as characters from Street Fighter, most recently appearing as Guile. He was the Head of Original Programming at Caffeine.

== Early life ==
Albrecht is the son of Dr. Mark Albrecht, former President of ILS, and Kathe Hicks Albrecht, past president and director of the Visual Resources Association, curator at American University in Washington, D.C. Albrecht went to elementary school at Burgundy Farm Country Day School, and graduated from American University with a degree in computer science. He was a member of the Delta Chi fraternity. While at college Albrecht was a cheerleader, with ambitions of becoming a professional mascot.

== Career ==
Albrecht worked for the RAND Corporation as a programmer and IT person and later worked for the Science Applications International Corporation developing multimedia programming for BP.

In 2001, he founded the improv-comedy troupe The Misfit Toys, which performed live in L.A. until 2003.

Albrecht appeared as a contestant on the gameshow Russian Roulette in 2002. He also appeared on Beat the Geeks.

Albrecht was hired by G4techTV to be the co-host alongside Kevin Rose (replacing Patrick Norton) of the television technology show, The Screen Savers, for the first G4techTV episode airing from Los Angeles. The first Los Angeles-based episode of The Screen Savers aired on September 7, 2004.

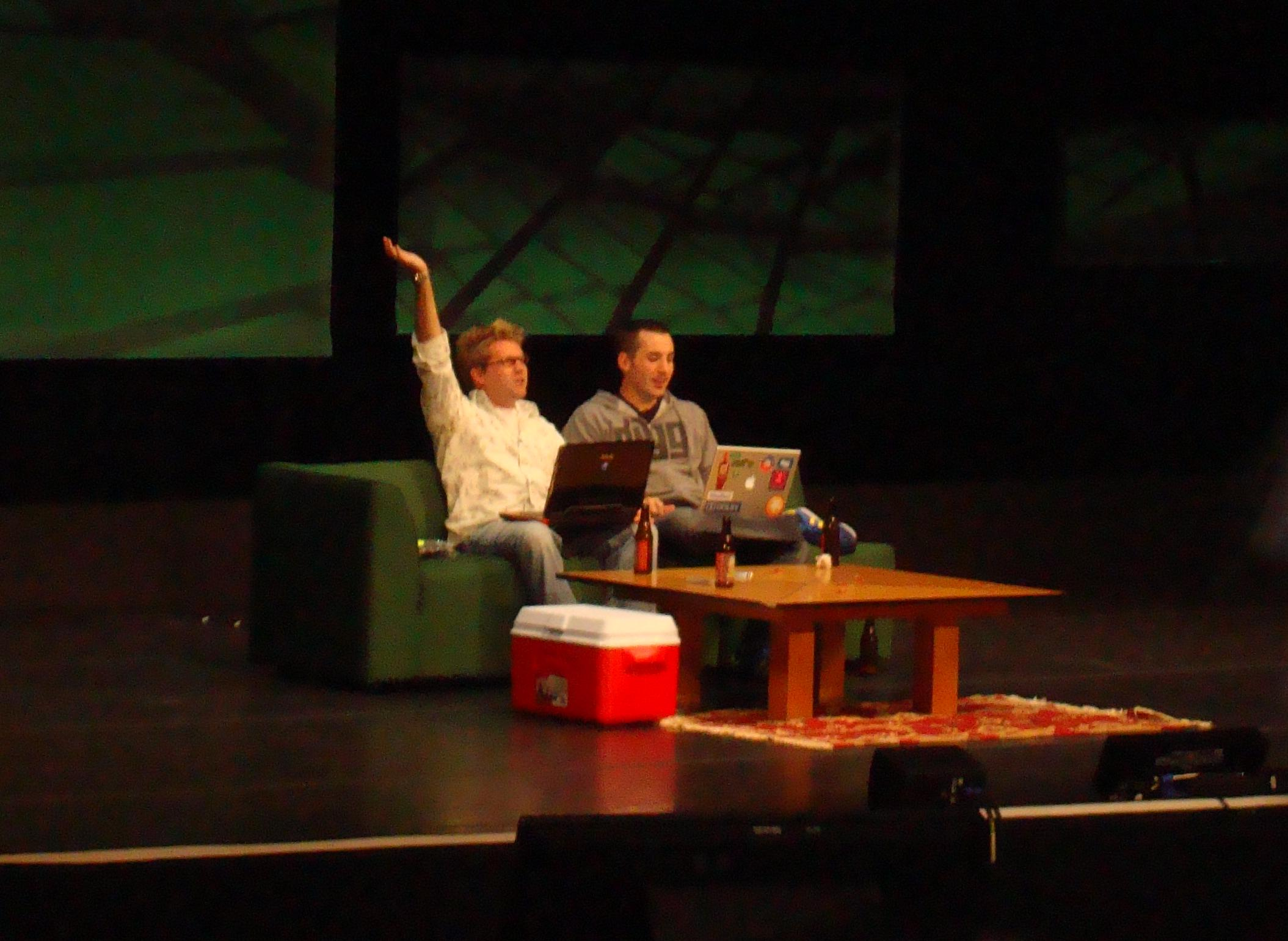
Rose and Albrecht presenting Diggnation's live show in San Jose as part of nVision 08

On August 5, 2005, Albrecht joined Revision3. Albrecht co-hosted Diggnation, a video podcast that summarizes a selection of the top stories submitted by Digg users, with former The Screen Savers co-host Kevin Rose. Albrecht also contributes to other projects for the company. He co-hosts a podcast called The Totally Rad Show, with Dan Trachtenberg and Jeff Cannata. The first episode was released on March 27, 2007. Albrecht also hosted Ctrl+Alt+Chicken, a weekly cooking show that lasted 8 episodes before being canceled in the fall of 2006.

Albrecht was featured in "SWGack", a weekly podcast on the popular MMORPG, Star Wars Galaxies. On March 4, 2006, he and Joshua Brentano announced on their last episode that they would discontinue the podcast due to disenchantment with the game itself.

Albrecht and Rose also appeared in a Super Bowl ad for GoDaddy.com during Super Bowl XLI. Albrecht has appeared in a Domino's Pizza commercial eating Domino's pizza in a house being raided by the "flavor" police. Albrecht has also appeared in a Dell commercial, advertising the line of High-Definition Dell LCD televisions; Albrecht has stated that this commercial was ad libbed. He has also mentioned doing an audition for an advertisement for McDonald's that was never aired in the US, but he has said that it was for British television.

Albrecht's next project was Project Lore (2008), a series centered on the video game World of Warcraft. On the show, Albrecht and friends show off the five main dungeons available in the game's first expansion pack, The Burning Crusade. Before World of Warcraft's second expansion pack, Wrath of the Lich King was released, the Project Lore team were allowed to showcase some of its new beta content. Project Lore has since been abandoned; there have not been any blog posts for some time and a potential revamp proved too costly and the Project has been turned over into the hands of the volunteer bloggers in hopes that they will continue on their own.

In 2009, Albrecht started an iPhone app company called App Dragon which released one app later that year called Duel.

In March 2010, Albrecht flew with the U.S. Navy Flight Demonstration Squadron (Blue Angels) in the back seat of Blue Angel #7 (frequently used for media and public relations flights).

In July 2010, Albrecht sought funding for the short film "Neverland" through Indiegogo, in which Albrecht was named as a director. According to Albrecht's Twitter account, shooting started July 30, 2010.

Albrecht guest-starred in The Legend of Zelda called The Legend of Neil, a web series that parodies The Legend of Zelda. Albrecht's character Todd is a member of a small group of soldiers led by Zelda's brother Tyrelda. In the series, Zelda is, much to Neil's surprise, black rather than white. Her brother Tyrelda and the rest of the elf troops are black as well and make constant reference to Albrecht's character being the token white guy. A number of stereotypes associated with African-Americans in the real world are reverse-applied to Todd and the white elf race in the land of Highrule. By the end of the episode, Todd appears to have died along with Tyrelda and the rest of the gang, making for a short-lived but noteworthy contribution made by Albrecht to the series.

In May 2012, a new show was released on the Nerdist YouTube Channel called 4 Points with Alex Albrecht. The show features 4 people discussing 4 different topics. Albrecht and co-host Alison Haislip are the only permanent members of the panel, with the other spots filled by a personality from some other Nerdist show and a celebrity, usually from TV or movies.

In April 2015, Albrecht and Alison Haislip started a new podcast called the Half Hour Happy Hour. He left the show in December 2018 and was replaced by Maude Garrett.

== Filmography ==
- The Legend of Neil as Todd
- The Romantic as The Spank
