= Kevin Rose =

American Internet entrepreneur (born 1977)

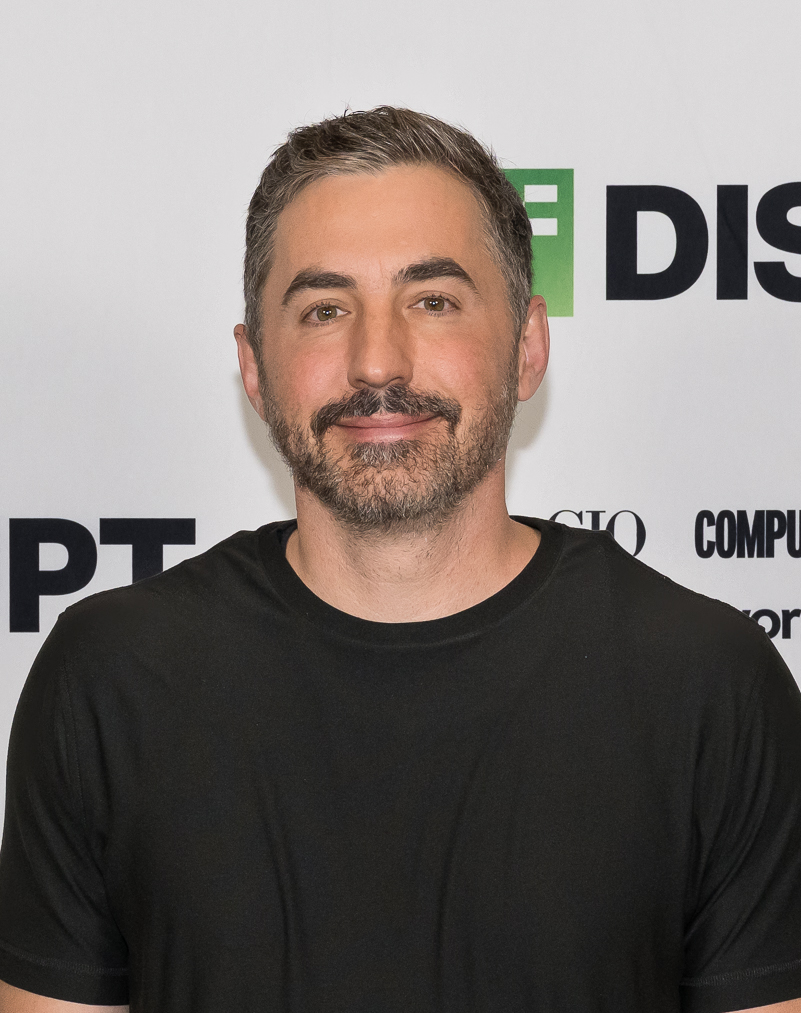
- Rose in 2025
- Born: 1977 (age 48–49); California, U.S.
- Employer(s): Digg (2004–2011, 2025–present); True Ventures (2017–present); GV (2009–2015)
- Known for: Co-host of The Screen Savers; Co-founder of Digg, Revision3 and Pownce
- Spouse: Darya Pino (m. 2013)
- Children: 2
- Website: www.kevinrose.com

Robert Kevin Rose (born 1977) is an American Internet entrepreneur who co-founded Revision3, Digg, Pownce, and Milk. He also served as production assistant and co-host at TechTV's The Screen Savers. From 2012 to 2015, he was a venture partner at GV. In 2025, Rose re-purchased Digg with Alexis Ohanian and re-launched it initially as a competitor to Reddit, before returning its focus to news aggregation.

== Early life and education ==
Rose was born in California and lived in Oregon before his family moved to Las Vegas, Nevada, where he spent most of his childhood. He became an Eagle Scout with the Boy Scouts of America. Rose transferred to Southeast Career Technical Academy for high school (formerly known as Vo-Tech High School) in Las Vegas in 1992. He then attended the University of Nevada Las Vegas, majored in computer science but dropped out in 1998.

== Career ==
Rose worked for two dot-com startups through CMGI.

=== Digg ===
Rose, Owen Byrne, Ron Gorodetzky, and Jay Adelson formed Digg, a technology link website, publicly launched on December 5, 2004. In 2007, he was named to the MIT Technology Review TR35 as one of the top 35 innovators in the world under the age of 35. In 2006, Fox InteractiveMedia Group offered $60 million (equivalent to $95.8 million in 2025) for Digg, which the Digg board turned down given how quickly the brand was continuing to grow. Over the next four years, CEO Rose lost interest in helping the site continue its growth, focusing on a series of non-Digg outside projects; the board eventually replaced him as CEO, on September 1, 2010.

Rose continued on at Digg until March 18, 2011, when he resigned from all operational activities, only keeping a presence on the board of directors; Digg was acquired by Betaworks, in 2012, for $0.5 million (equivalent to $0.7 million in 2025).

In 2025, more than a decade after he originally sold it, Rose re-purchased Digg with Reddit cofounder Alexis Ohanian and re-launched it as a rebooted version of Digg's news aggregator with digging and burying features restored and the tagline: "The front page of the internet, now with superpowers." During its closed beta stage, it offered 21 generalized communities such as gaming, technology, and entertainment, and was open to 67,000 users on an invite-only basis. Its open beta launched to the public on January 14, 2026.

=== Television ===
Rose was hired as a production assistant for The Screen Savers. He began appearing on-air in the "Dark Tip" segments and on Unscrewed with Martin Sargent, where he provided information on developing computing activities. He became a regular co-host when Leo Laporte left TechTV on March 31, 2004. On March 25, 2004, Comcast's G4 gaming channel announced a merger with TechTV, which resulted in a round of layoffs. Rose moved to Los Angeles to stay with G4. On May 22, 2005, Rose reached an agreement with G4 that released him from his contract and went on to create Systm and later, Revision3, where he co-hosted Diggnation alongside Alex Albrecht for 6 years.

=== Guest appearances ===
Kevin Rose appeared on the first episode of R&D TV alongside Diggnation co-host Alex Albrecht. On November 14, 2007, he was a contestant on a game show on Gigaom's NewTeeVee Live. On March 11, 2009, April 16, 2010, and November 28, 2011, Rose was a guest on Late Night with Jimmy Fallon, along with fellow Diggnation host Alex Albrecht.

=== Podcasting ===
Rose began his career in web video (or IPTV) on July 24, 2003, with the release of the first episode of thebroken while he was still working on The Screen Savers at TechTV. Rose founded Revision3 in Los Angeles, California, with Jay Adelson and David Prager in April 2005. On July 1, 2005, Rose and Alex Albrecht started the weekly podcast, Diggnation, which summarizes top stories submitted by Digg users. On October 3, 2011, Alex and Kevin announced that they would be retiring the weekly Diggnation show at the end of the year. The final show was taped on December 30, 2011, at The Music Box in Los Angeles, California.

Starting in 2009, Rose started an intermittent podcast called The Random Show with friend Tim Ferriss.

In 2024, Kevin and Alex rebooted Diggnation on the YouTube channel @diggnation.

=== Other startups ===
Around 1998-1999, Kevin Rose started SimpleSearch.com in Las Vegas with his sister and brother-in-law, Kurt Arobogast. On June 27, 2007, Rose launched a micro-blogging site called Pownce, which was acquired on December 1, 2008, and shut down on December 15, 2008, by blogging company Six Apart. In April 2011, the technology blog TechCrunch reported on the founding of "Milk". The company is focused on creating mobile applications. The first application to be released was Oink, a tool for ranking real-world items. In March 2012, Milk, Inc. announced that it would be shutting down its only product, Oink.

=== Google ===
On March 16, 2012, Rose announced that he, along with the four others of the Milk team (Daniel Burka, Chris Hutchins and Joshua Lane), had been hired by Google after shutting down Milk and laying off the remaining members. Kevin Rose started his first day as a senior product manager for Google on March 19, 2012. On May 30, AllThingsD reported that Rose had moved off the Google+ team to become a venture partner at GV. In January 2015, Rose announced he would leave GV to focus on his new app development lab, North.

=== Venture capitalist ===
Rose invested in Gowalla, Twitter, Foursquare, Dailybooth, ngmoco, SimpleGeo, 3crowd, OMGPOP, Square, Facebook, Chomp and Formspring.

=== Watchville/Hodinkee ===
After leaving Google, Rose started Watchville, a news aggregation app focused on wristwatches. In July 2015, after Watchville merged with another watch-enthusiast site called Hodinkee, Rose moved to New York City to become the chief executive of Hodinkee.

In April 2017, Rose stepped down from his role as Hodinkee CEO to become a partner in a start-up venture firm, True Ventures.

=== Proof Collective ===
Rose co-founded the Proof Collective, a group of NFT collectors, alongside Justin Mezzell. Members of the group include artist Mike Winkelmann, known as Beeple, and investor Gary Vaynerchuk. The collective released a collaboration called Moonbirds, a collection of 10,000 pixelated-bird non-fungible tokens which had $281 million in sales as of April 2022. Rose said Proof would use the proceeds to "build a new media company".

=== Other appearances ===
Rose has a chapter giving advice in Tim Ferriss' 2016 book, Tools of Titans.

== Controversies ==
=== Protest at Rose's house ===
On April 6, 2014, protestors demonstrated in front of Rose's home in San Francisco. The protesters held up a banner calling Rose a "parasite" and distributed a pamphlet accusing Rose of directing "the flow of capital from Google into the tech startup bubble that is destroying San Francisco." One banner read "I'ma Snip Snip Yr Ballz", an allusion to Rose's 2008 video podcast on Diggnation in which he joked about cutting off women's breasts.

=== Portland home demolition controversy ===
On February 28, 2014, Rose and his wife Darya Pino purchased an 1892 house at 1627 Northwest 32nd Avenue in the Willamette Heights area of Portland, Oregon. They removed the historic designation of the 122-year-old home and filed plans to demolish it. On June 24, 2014, it was reported that the Roses had accepted an offer from long-time neighborhood residents to buy the house, with the deal closing for $1.375 million USD.

== Personal life ==
In 2013, he married Darya Pino.
