= Digg =

Social media/news aggregator website

Digg, Inc.
- Website type: Social news
- Available in: English
- Founded: November 2004; 22 years ago
- Headquarters: Los Angeles, U.S. (current); New York City, U.S.
- Area served: Worldwide
- Owners: Kevin Rose; Alexis Ohanian
- Founder: Kevin Rose
- Key people: Justin Mezzell (CEO); Kevin Rose (chairman); Alexis Ohanian (advisor)
- Website: digg.com
- Registration: Optional
- Launched: December 5, 2004; 21 years ago
- Current status: Active

Digg (stylized as digg) is an American social bookmarking news aggregator, with a feed that displays the internet's most popular content (Most Dugg), Newest, Trending, and content that’s "Heating up." It was re-launched in its second-to-current form in June 2025, and its current form in May 2026.

Originally launched in 2004 by Kevin Rose, Owen Byrne, Ron Gorodetzky, and Jay Adelson, Digg began as a web platform that allowed people to submit links (especially user-generated content) and then let others vote on it, up or down, called digging and burying, respectively. The website became a sensation, amassing millions of users and quickly gained the reputation of being one of Silicon Valley's hottest startups, driving significant traffic to content creators and publishers. After a poorly received redesign in 2010, its audience plummeted and much of its user base migrated to its competitor Reddit. Rose sold the company to Betaworks in 2012 and for more than a decade, the site existed as an editorially driven webpage of curated content.

In 2025, Rose re-purchased Digg with Reddit cofounder Alexis Ohanian and re-launched it as a rebooted version of Digg's news aggregator with digging and burying features restored and the tagline: "The front page of the internet, now with superpowers." The open beta launched to the public on January 14, 2026, but was shut down two months later, on March 14, 2026, with Digg CEO Justin Mezzell citing the "brutal reality of finding product-market fit in an environment that has fundamentally changed" and an "unprecedented bot problem."

Mezzell said Rose would return to join the team full-time in April and make the successful relaunch of the site his primary focus.

== History ==
Originally launched in 2004 by Kevin Rose, Owen Byrne, Ron Gorodetzky, and Jay Adelson, Digg began as a web platform that allowed people to submit links (especially user-generated content) and then let others vote on it, up or down, called digging and burying, respectively. The website amassed millions of users and quickly gained the reputation of being one of Silicon Valley's most prominent startups, driving significant traffic to content creators and publishers. After a poorly received redesign in 2010, its audience plummeted and much of its user base migrated to its competitor Reddit. Rose sold the company to Betaworks in 2012 and for more than a decade, the site existed as an editorially driven webpage of curated content.

In 2025, Rose re-purchased Digg with Reddit cofounder Alexis Ohanian and re-launched it as a rebooted version of Digg's news aggregator with digging and burying features restored and the tagline: "The front page of the internet, now with superpowers." During its closed beta stage, it offered 21 generalized communities such as gaming, technology, and entertainment, and was open to 67,000 users on an invite-only basis. Its open beta launched to the public on January 14, 2026, closed on March 14, and launched again on May 11 as a X tech news aggregator using AI.

=== 2004–2010: Founding and the early years ===
An early version of Digg.com from 2004

Digg started as an experiment in November 2004 by collaborators Kevin Rose, Owen Byrne, Ron Gorodetzky, and Jay Adelson. The original design by Dan Ries was free of advertisements. To monetize, the company originally used Google AdSense but switched to MSN adCenter in 2007.

Rose told The Verge that he launched the site because "I thought, well, this would be an improved, more social version of Slashdot. And as being a geek, I kind of wanted to just figure out: Is there something here? Are there nuggets that the editors of Slashdot are overlooking that the masses would come together and vote on and bring to the surface?"

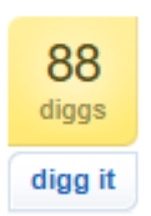
The Digg button in 2006

At the time of Digg's launch, there wasn't a way to vote on a piece of content akin to a Like button. Digg's creative director Daniel Burka came up with the idea for a Digg button. "[Burka] picked a really cool color palette — he made it yellow. And we went back and forth on whether it should be an arrow or a thumb. He designed a little thumb, and I didn’t like the way some of the fingers looked, so we redesigned it. We went back and forth a few times there. And we eventually got to this idea of a thumb going up with a number next to it, which, again, I know it sounds simple, but we’ve never seen that before."

Digg allowed users to discover and share web content by submitting links and voting them up ("digg") or down ("bury"). The platform aggregated these votes into dynamic lists of trending content, with voting accessible both on Digg.com and through "digg" buttons embedded on external websites.

Digg underwent several updates in its early years, including the release of Digg v2 in July 2005 with a redesigned interface, friends list, and streamlined voting.

Also in July 2005, Rose launched a weekly tech/comedy video podcast with Alex Albrecht called diggnation, where they would discuss the top stories shared on the website.

In August 2006, Rose was featured on the cover of BusinessWeek with the headline, "How this kid made $60 million in 18 months".

In August 2006, BusinessWeek profiled Digg and Rose, with a cover story and a headline that read: "How this kid made $60 million in 18 months". Written by technology journalist Sarah Lacy, the profile trumpeted Rose as the poster child of the new wave of internet startups. According to TechCrunch, the magazine instructed him on what to wear and props to bring which "highlight(ed) him as a young entrepreneur for the three and a half hour photo shoot." After putting headphones around his head and flashing a thumbs up, Rose asked the magazine not to use the photo. They did not heed his request.

In 2006, Digg v3 introduced content categories like technology, science, and entertainment, along with a "view all" section, followed by additional interface changes in 2007.

By 2008, Digg's homepage was attracting over 236 million visitors annually, according to a Compete.com survey. Digg had grown large enough that it was thought to affect the traffic of submitted web pages. Some pages experienced a sudden increase in traffic shortly after being submitted; some Digg users refer to this as the "Digg effect".

In July 2008, the company took part in advanced acquisition talks with Google for a reported $200 million price tag, but the deal ultimately fell through.

=== 2010–2012: Redesign and mass exodus to Reddit ===
Digg homepage in 2008 before the redesign

CEO Jay Adelson said in 2010 that the site would go through some major changes. In the interview with Wired magazine, Adelson said that "Every single THING has changed" and that "the entire website has been rewritten." The company changed from MySQL to Cassandra, a distributed database system; in a blog post, VP Engineering John Quinn said that the move was "bold". Adelson summed up the new Digg by saying, "We've got a new backend, a new infrastructure layer, a new services layer, new machines—everything."

Adelson stepped down as CEO on April 5, 2010, to explore entrepreneurial opportunities, months before the launch date of Digg v4. He had been the company's CEO since its inception. Rose stepped in temporarily as CEO and Chairman.

Digg's v4 release on August 25, 2010, was marred by site-wide bugs and glitches. Digg users reacted with hostile verbal opposition. Beyond the release, Digg faced problems due to so-called "power users" who would manipulate the article recommendation features to only support one another's postings, flooding the site with articles only from these users and making it impossible to have genuine content from non-power users appear on the front page. Frustrations with the system led to dwindling web traffic, exacerbated by heavy competition from Facebook, whose like buttons started to appear on websites next to Digg's. High staff turnover included the departure of head of business development Matt Van Horn, shortly after v4's release.

Following the redesign debacle, Digg experienced a mass exodus of users to rival site Reddit. While Digg’s traffic plummeted by a quarter in the following month, Reddit’s traffic grew by 230% in 2010. The site never recovered from the Digg v4 design and continued to languish over the next two years. By July 2012, Digg's monthly unique visitor count had fallen 90 percent from its peak.

=== 2012–2018: The Betaworks era ===
In 2012, Quantcast estimated Digg's monthly U.S. unique visits at 3.8 million. After the departure of co-founders Jay Adelson and Kevin Rose, in July 2012 Digg was sold in three parts:

1. the Digg brand, website, and technology were sold to Betaworks for $500,000;
2. 15 staff were transferred to The Washington Post's Code3 project for $12 million;
3. the patent portfolio was sold to LinkedIn for approximately $4 million.

On July 20, 2012, new owners Betaworks announced via Twitter that they were rebuilding Digg from scratch, "turning [Digg] back into a start-up". Betaworks gave the project a six-week deadline. Surveys of existing users, collected through the website ReThinkDigg.com, were used to inform the development of a new user interface and user experience.

The "rethought" Digg reset its version number and launched as Digg v1 a day prior to the Betaworks project deadline, on July 31, 2012. It featured an editorially driven front page, more images, and top, popular and upcoming stories. Users could access a new scoring system. There was increased support for sharing content to other social platforms such as Twitter and Facebook. Digg's front page content was selected by editors, instead of users on other communities like Reddit and a major shift from previously featuring content using a Digg score algorithm.

In response to the announced shutdown of Google Reader, Digg announced on March 14, 2013 that it was working on its own RSS reader. Digg Reader launched on June 28, 2013 as a web and iOS application. An Android app was released on August 29, 2013. Digg announced that it would shut down Digg Reader on March 26, 2018.

=== 2018–2025: The BuySellAds/Money Group era ===
In April 2018, ad-tech company BuySellAds bought Digg's assets, as well as its editorial and revenue teams, for an undisclosed amount with Todd Garland becoming CEO of the company.

During the BuySellAds era, Digg was kept as an editorially curated homepage in the mold of the Betaworks version, staffed with an editorial team of five responsible for the day-to-day content, producing 150 to 200 posts per day, with 12 of them curated into a daily email. "We sought out people who (were) in tune with the heartbeat of the internet and are familiar with how content bubbles up and becomes viral. While Digg's purpose isn't necessarily to showcase all the viral content of the web, we try to find the things that are most interesting that should get more attention." explained Garland.

Digg was later acquired by Money Group for an undisclosed amount.

=== 2025–present: The Rose-Ohanian era ===
In March 2025, it was announced that Digg founder Rose and Reddit cofounder Alexis Ohanian bought the website back for an undisclosed amount. In the same month, Justin Mezzell was named the new CEO of Digg. Plans for the new Digg included a combination of AI tools and humans for content moderation, as well as aiming the site primarily at people on mobile devices. Invitations to the new Digg was distributed in the weeks following the initial announcement.

In April 2025, an early access community called Groundbreakers was opened with a $5 sign-up fee, capped at 23,000 signups. Groundbreakers hit their maximum capacity on April 21, 2025. Groundbreaker members were promised "updates, mockups, and experiments" and a "front-row seat to how Digg is being rebuilt." Users who joined Groundbreakers reserved their username and were promised a badge on the new reincarnation of the platform when its open beta later released.

Its open beta opened to the public on January 14, 2026, with all users able to join and start their own communities on nearly any topic, and previous groundbreakers receiving their badges. Two months later on March 14, 2026, Digg closed again, calling it a hard reset. Citing "an unprecedented bot problem" and "the brutal reality of finding product-market fit in an environment that has fundamentally changed." Mezzell announced that Kevin Rose would be returning to the team full time starting the first week of April.

On May 11, 2026, it was rebooted again as an AI news aggregator taking from X (formerly called Twitter). An email to beta testers said that now, the site's goal was to "track the most influential voices in a space", and to "surface news worth paying attention to". Digg said on their homepage, that they are doing this because of the same bot problem that shut them down four months ago.

== Criticism and controversies ==
=== Organized promotion and censorship by users ===
Attempts by users to game the site began as early as 2006. A top user was banned after agreeing to promote a story for cash to an undercover Digg sting operation. Another group of users openly formed a 'Bury Brigade' to remove "spam" articles about US politician Ron Paul; critics accused the group of attempting to stifle any mention of Ron Paul on Digg.

Digg hired computer scientist Anton Kast to develop a diversity algorithm that would prevent special interest groups from dominating Digg. During a town hall meeting, Digg executives responded to criticism by removing some features that gave superusers extra weight, but declined to make "buries" transparent.

However, later that year Google increased its page rank for Digg. Shortly afterwards, many 'pay for Diggs' startups were created to profit from the opportunity. According to TechCrunch, one top user charged $700 per story, with a $500 bonus if the story reached the front page.

Digg Patriots was a conservative Yahoo! Groups mailing list, with an associated page on coRank, accused of coordinated, politically motivated behavior on Digg. Progressive blogger Ole Ole Olson wrote in August 2010 that Digg Patriots undertook a year-long effort of organized burying of seemingly liberal articles from Digg's Upcoming module. He also accused leading members of vexatiously reporting liberal users for banning (and those who seemed liberal), and creating "sleeper" accounts in the event of administrators banning their accounts. These and other actions would violate Digg's terms of usage. Olson's post was immediately followed by the disbanding and closure of the DiggPatriots list, and an investigation into the matter by Digg.

=== AACS encryption key controversy ===
On May 1, 2007, an article appeared on Digg's homepage that contained the encryption key for the AACS digital rights management protection of HD DVD and Blu-ray Disc. Then Digg, "acting on the advice of its lawyers", removed posting submissions about the secret number from its database and banned several users for submitting it. The removals were seen by many Digg users as a capitulation to corporate interests and an assault on free speech. A statement by Jay Adelson attributed the article's take-down to an attempt to comply with cease and desist letters from the Advanced Access Content System consortium and cited Digg's Terms of Use as justification for taking down the article. Although some users defended Digg's actions, as a whole the community staged a widespread revolt with numerous articles and comments made using the encryption key. The scope of the user response was so great that one of the Digg users referred to it as a "digital Boston Tea Party". The response was also directly responsible for Digg reversing the policy and stating: "But now, after seeing hundreds of stories and reading thousands of comments, you've made it clear. You'd rather see Digg go down fighting than bow down to a bigger company. We hear you, and effective immediately we won't delete stories or comments containing the code and will deal with whatever the consequences might be."

=== Digg v4 ===
Digg's version 4 release was initially unstable for weeks after its launch on August 25, 2010. Many users, upon finally reaching the site, complained about the new design and the removal of many features (such as bury, favorites, friends submissions, upcoming pages, subcategories, videos and history search). Kevin Rose replied to complaints on his blog, promising to fix the algorithm and restore some features.

Alexis Ohanian, founder of rival site Reddit, said in an open letter to Rose:

this new version of digg reeks of VC meddling. It's cobbling together features from more popular sites and departing from the core of digg, which was to "give the power back to the people."

Disgruntled users declared a "quit Digg day" on August 30, 2010, and used Digg's own auto-submit feature to fill the front page with content from Reddit. Reddit also temporarily added the Digg shovel to their logo to welcome fleeing Digg users.

Digg's traffic dropped significantly after the launch of version 4, and publishers reported a drop in direct referrals from stories on Digg's front page. New CEO Matt Williams attempted to address some of the users' concerns in a blog post on October 12, 2010, promising to reinstate many of the features that had been removed.
