= George Shultz =

American economist and statesman (1920–2021)

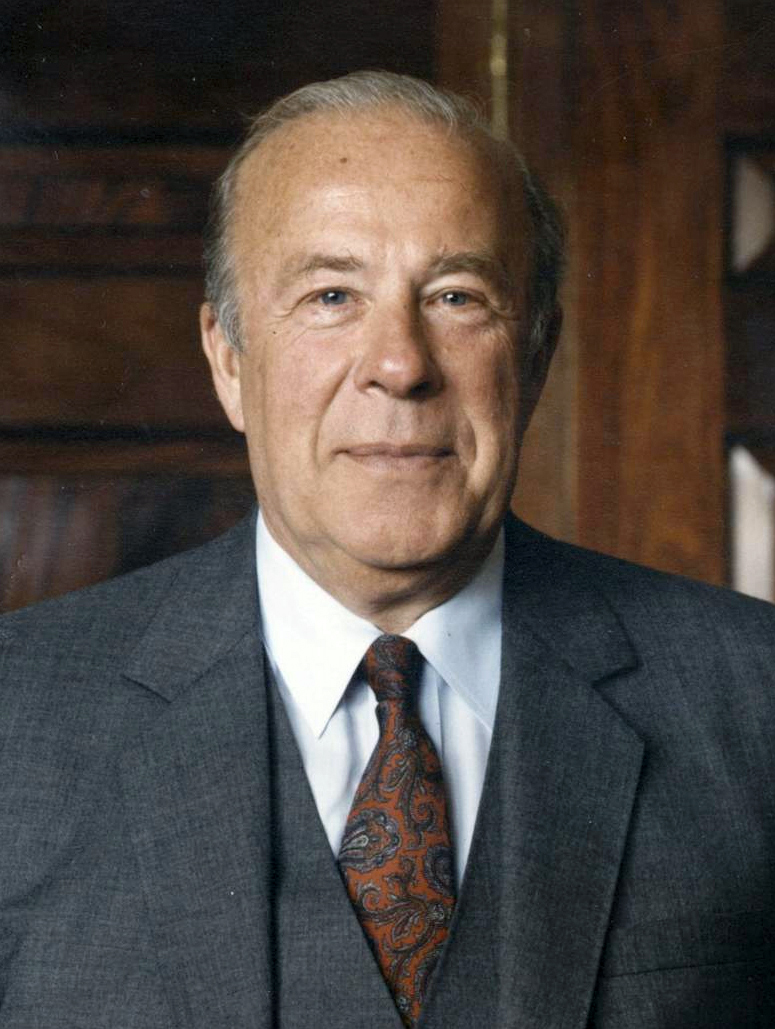
- Shultz as United States Secretary of State, 1980s

60th United States Secretary of State
- In office July 16, 1982 – January 20, 1989
- President: Ronald Reagan
- Deputy: Walter J. Stoessel Jr.; Kenneth W. Dam; John C. Whitehead
- Preceded by: Alexander Haig
- Succeeded by: James Baker

62nd United States Secretary of the Treasury
- In office June 12, 1972 – May 8, 1974
- President: Richard Nixon
- Preceded by: John Connally
- Succeeded by: William E. Simon

19th Director of the Office of Management and Budget
- In office July 1, 1970 – June 11, 1972
- President: Richard Nixon
- Preceded by: Bob Mayo (Bureau of the Budget)
- Succeeded by: Caspar Weinberger

11th United States Secretary of Labor
- In office January 22, 1969 – July 1, 1970
- President: Richard Nixon
- Preceded by: W. Willard Wirtz
- Succeeded by: James Day Hodgson

Personal details
- Born: George Pratt Shultz; December 13, 1920 New York City, New York, U.S.
- Died: February 6, 2021 (aged 100) Stanford, California, U.S.
- Party: Republican
- Spouses: Helena O'Brien (m. 1946; died 1995); Charlotte Mailliard (m. 1997)
- Children: 5
- Relatives: Tyler Shultz (grandson)
- Education: Princeton University (BS); Massachusetts Institute of Technology (PhD)
- Awards: Presidential Medal of Freedom (1989)

Military service
- Allegiance: United States
- Branch: United States Marine Corps
- Service years: 1942–1945
- Rank: Captain
- Battles/wars: World War II; Battle of Angaur

George Pratt Shultz (/ʃʊlts/ SHUULTS; December 13, 1920 – February 6, 2021) was an American economist, businessman, diplomat, and statesman who served in various positions under presidents Richard Nixon and Ronald Reagan. A member of the Republican Party, he is one of only two persons to have held four different Cabinet-level posts, the other being Elliot Richardson. As the 60th United States secretary of state, Shultz played a major role in shaping the foreign policy of the Reagan administration, and conservative foreign policy thought thereafter.

Born in New York City, Shultz grew up in Englewood, New Jersey. After graduating from Princeton University, he served in the United States Marine Corps during World War II. After the war, Shultz earned a Doctor of Philosophy in industrial economics from the Massachusetts Institute of Technology (MIT). He taught at MIT from 1948 to 1957, taking a leave of absence in 1955 to take a position on President Dwight D. Eisenhower's Council of Economic Advisers. After serving as dean of the University of Chicago Graduate School of Business, he accepted President Nixon's appointment as United States Secretary of Labor.

As secretary of Labor, Shultz imposed the Philadelphia Plan on construction contractors who refused to accept black members, marking the first use of racial quotas by the federal government. In 1970, he became the first director of the Office of Management and Budget, and he served in that position until his appointment as United States Secretary of the Treasury in 1972. In that role, Shultz supported the Nixon shock, which sought to revive the ailing economy in part by abolishing the gold standard, and presided over the end of the Bretton Woods system. Shultz left Nixon's administration in May 1974 to become an executive at Bechtel. After becoming president and director of that company, he accepted President Reagan's offer to serve as secretary of state, holding that office from 1982 to 1989. Shultz pushed for Reagan to establish relations with Soviet leader Mikhail Gorbachev, which led to a thaw between the United States and the Soviet Union. He opposed the U.S. aid to Contras trying to overthrow the Sandinistas by using funds from an illegal sale of weapons to Iran. This aid led to the Iran–Contra affair.

Shultz retired from public office in 1989, upon the end of his tenure as secretary of State, but remained active in business and politics. He had already been an executive of the Bechtel Group, an engineering and services company, from 1974 to 1982. Shultz served as an informal adviser to George W. Bush and helped formulate the Bush Doctrine of preemptive war. He served on the Global Commission on Drug Policy, California governor Arnold Schwarzenegger's Economic Recovery Council, and on the boards of Bechtel and the Charles Schwab Corporation. Beginning in 2013, Shultz advocated for a revenue-neutral carbon fee and dividend as the most economically sound means of mitigating anthropogenic climate change. He was a member of the Hoover Institution, the Institute for International Economics, the Washington Institute for Near East Policy, and other groups. Shultz was also a board member of Theranos, with his grandson Tyler Shultz working at the company before becoming a whistleblower about its fraudulent technology. Shultz died at the age of 100 in February 2021.

== Early life, education, and career ==
George Pratt Shultz was born December 13, 1920, in New York City, the only child of Margaret Lennox (née Pratt) and Birl Earl Shultz. He grew up in Englewood, New Jersey. His great-grandfather was an immigrant from Germany who arrived in the United States in the middle of the 19th century. Contrary to common assumption, Shultz was not a member of the Pratt family associated with John D. Rockefeller and the Standard Oil Trust.

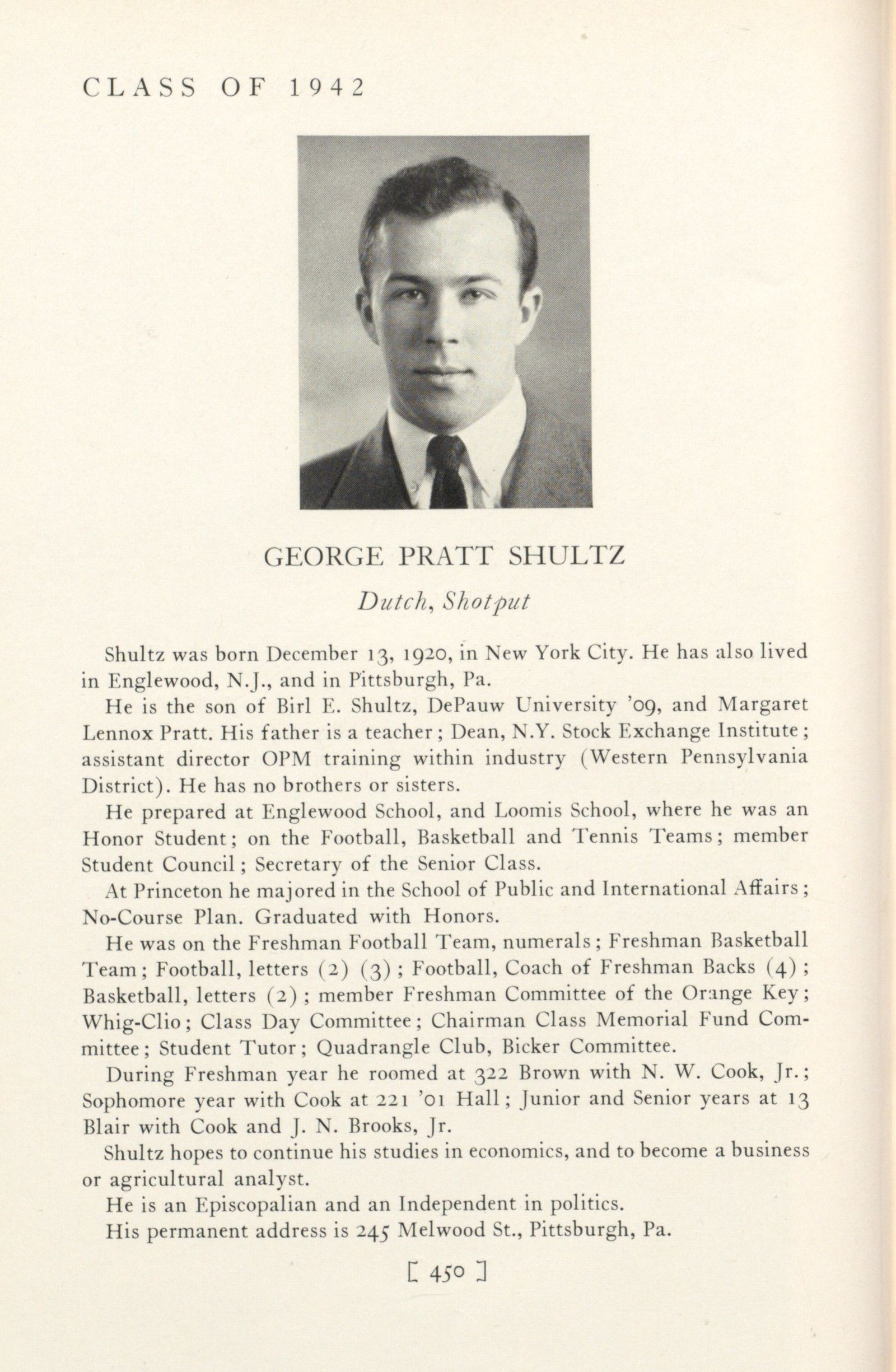
Shultz in the Princeton University's 1942 yearbook

After attending the local public school, he transferred to the Englewood School for Boys (now Dwight-Englewood School), through his second year of high school. In 1938, Shultz graduated from the private preparatory boarding high school Loomis Chaffee School in Windsor, Connecticut. He earned a bachelor's degree, cum laude, at Princeton University, New Jersey, in economics with a minor in public and international affairs. His senior thesis, "The Agricultural Program of the Tennessee Valley Authority", examined the Tennessee Valley Authority's effect on local agriculture, for which he conducted on-site research. He graduated with honors in 1942.

From 1942 to 1945, Shultz was on active duty in the U.S. Marine Corps. He was an artillery officer, attaining the rank of captain. In the fall of 1943, he saw action with the 7th Defense Battalion at Nanumea. Later, he was attached to the U.S. Army's 81st Infantry Division during the Battle of Angaur (Battle of Peleliu).

In 1949, Shultz earned a PhD in industrial economics from the Massachusetts Institute of Technology. From 1948 to 1957, he taught in the MIT Department of Economics and the MIT Sloan School of Management, with a leave of absence in 1955 to serve on President Dwight D. Eisenhower's Council of Economic Advisers as a Senior Staff Economist. In 1957, Shultz left MIT and joined the University of Chicago Graduate School of Business as a professor of industrial relations, and he served as the Graduate School of Business Dean from 1962 to 1968. During his time in Chicago, he was influenced by Nobel Laureates Milton Friedman and George Stigler, who reinforced Shultz's view of the importance of a free-market economy. He left the University of Chicago to serve under President Richard Nixon in 1969.

== Nixon administration (1969–1974) ==
=== Secretary of Labor (1969–1970) ===
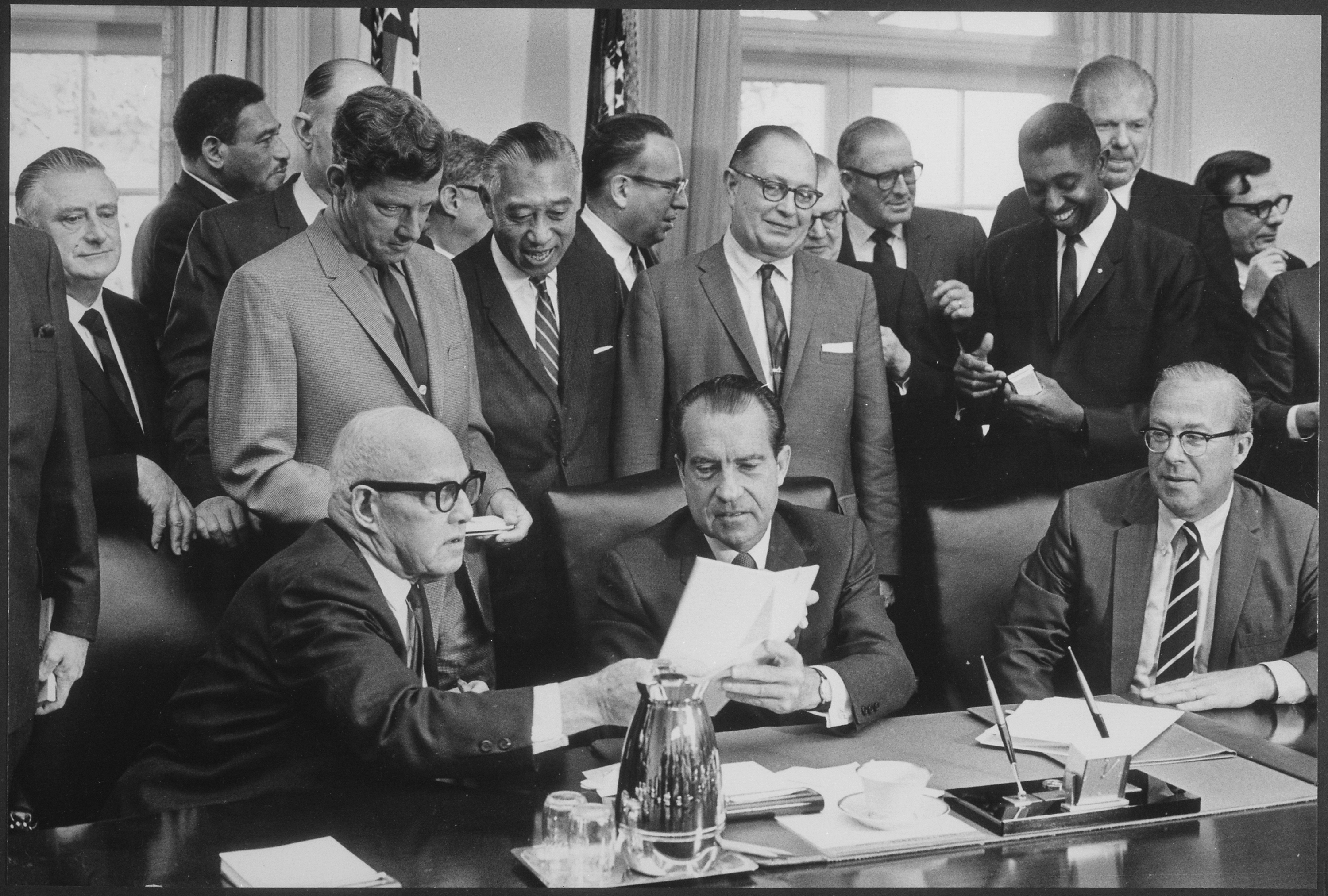
Shultz (right) with President Richard Nixon and labor leaders at the signing of Executive Order 11491 on October 29, 1969

Shultz was President Richard Nixon's secretary of labor from 1969 to 1970. He soon faced the crisis of the Longshoremen's Union strike. The Lyndon B. Johnson Administration had delayed the walkout with a Taft–Hartley injunction that expired, and the press pressed him to describe his approach. He applied the theory he had developed in academia: he let the parties work it out, which they did quickly. He also imposed the Philadelphia Plan, which required Pennsylvania construction unions to admit a certain number of black members by an enforced deadline—a break with their past policy of largely discriminating against such members. This marked the first use of racial quotas in the federal government.

Daniel Patrick Moynihan, Nixon's first choice for Secretary of Labor, was deemed unacceptable by AFL–CIO President George Meany, which pushed to fill the position with Shultz, then Dean of University of Chicago's School of Business, (with prior experience in another GOP administration, on President Eisenhower's Council of Economic Advisers).

=== Office of Management and Budget (1970–1972) ===
Shultz became the first director of the Office of Management and Budget, the renamed and reorganized Bureau of the Budget, on July 1, 1970. He was the agency's 19th director.

=== Secretary of the Treasury (1972–1974) ===
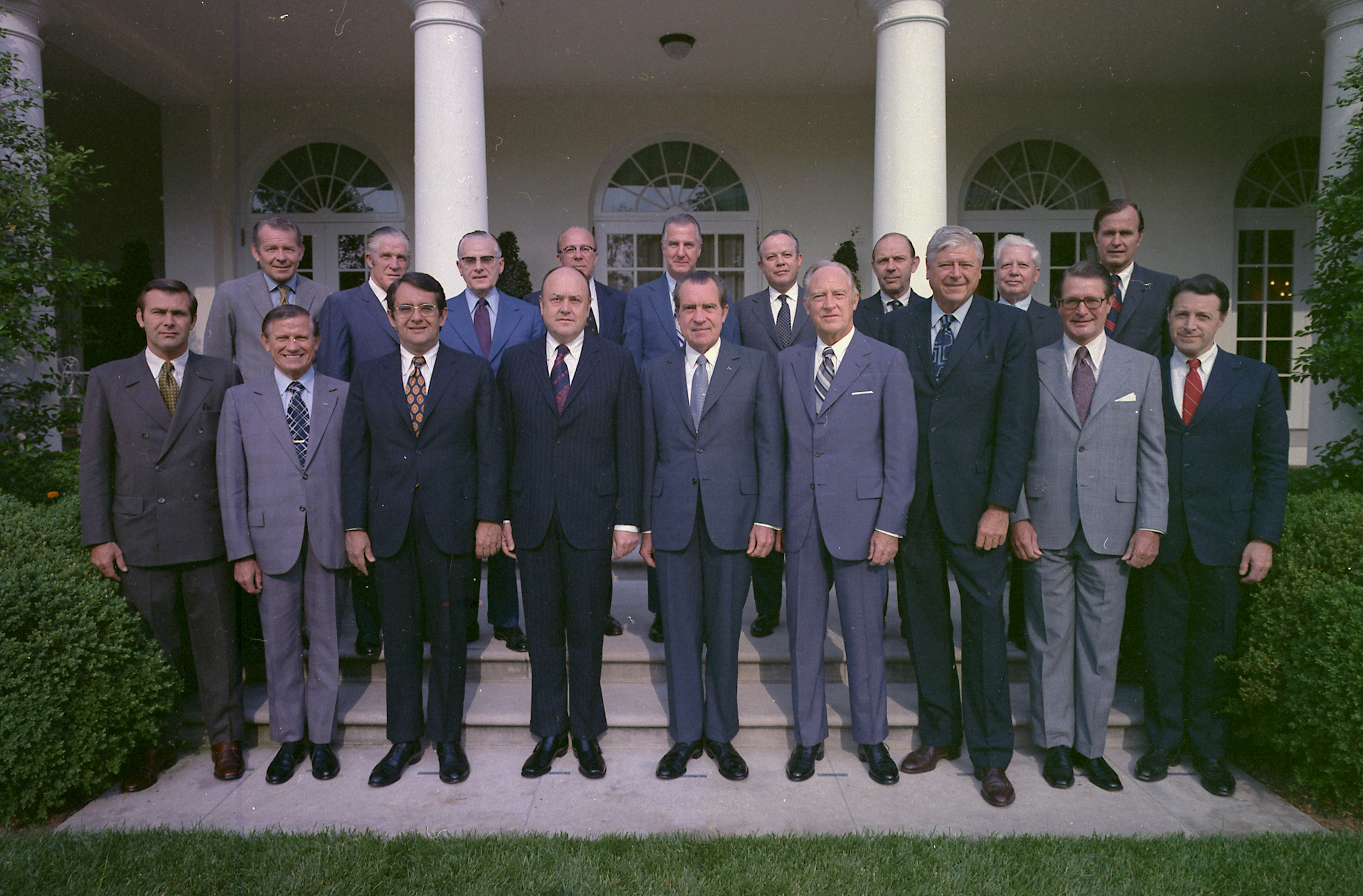
Treasury Secretary Shultz (back row, fourth from left) with the rest of the Nixon cabinet, June 1972

Shultz was United States Secretary of the Treasury from June 1972 to May 1974. During his tenure, he was concerned with two major issues, namely the continuing domestic administration of Nixon's "New Economic Policy", begun under Secretary John Connally (Shultz privately opposed its three elements), and a renewed dollar crisis that broke out in February 1973.

Domestically Shultz enacted the next phase of the NEP, lifting price controls begun in 1971. This phase was a failure, resulting in high inflation, and price freezes were reestablished five months later.

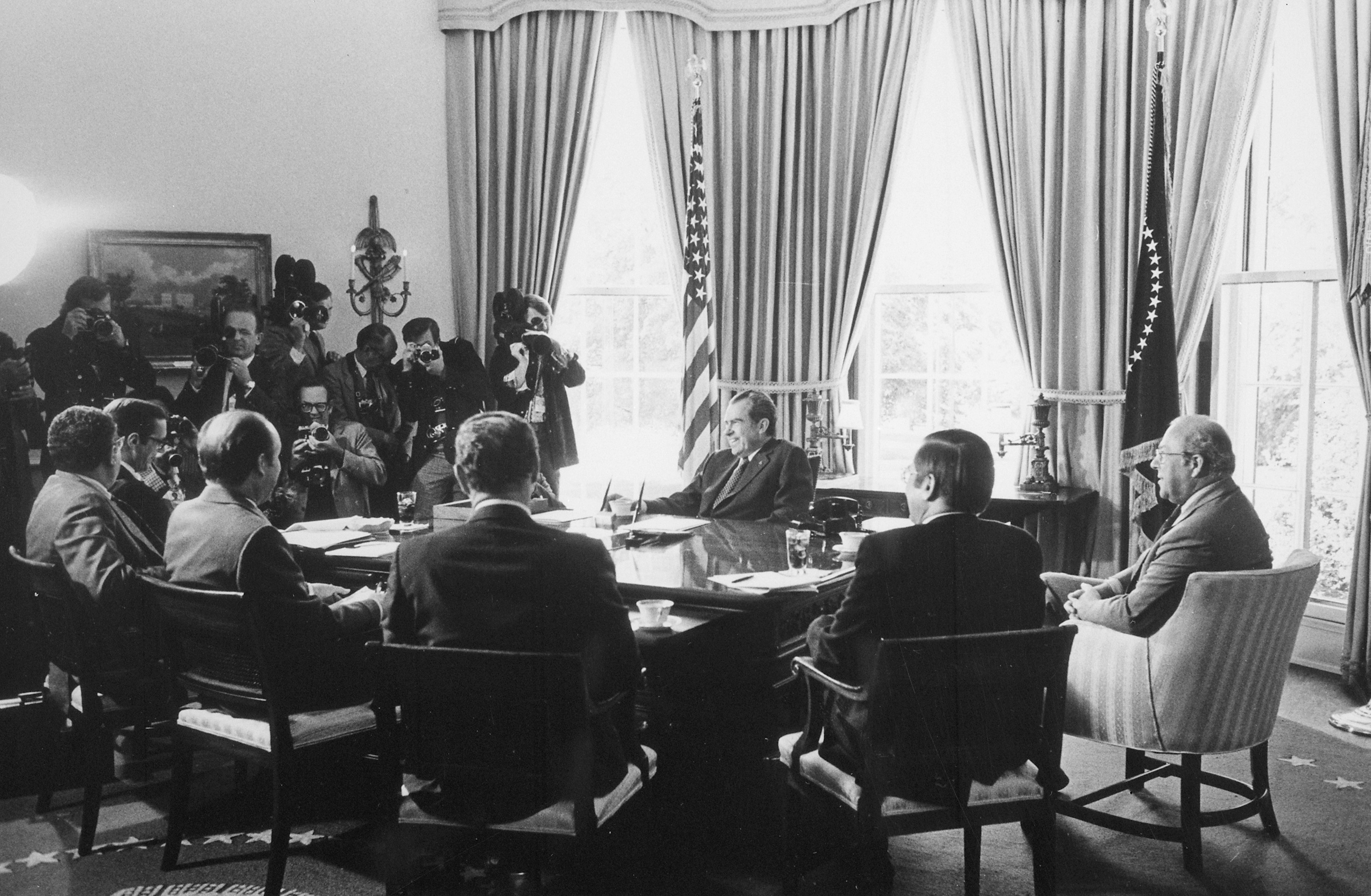
A meeting of Nixon Administration economic advisors and cabinet members on May 7, 1974. Clockwise from Richard Nixon: George P. Shultz, James T. Lynn, Alexander M. Haig, Jr., Roy L. Ash, Herbert Stein, and William E. Simon.

Meanwhile, Shultz's attention was increasingly diverted from the domestic economy to the international arena. In 1973, he participated in an international monetary conference in Paris that grew out of the 1971 decision to abolish the gold standard, a decision Shultz and Paul Volcker had supported (see Nixon shock). The conference formally abolished the Bretton Woods system, causing all currencies to float. During this period Shultz co-founded the "Library Group", which became the G7. Shultz resigned shortly before Nixon to return to private life.

Shultz was instrumental in handling relations with Soviet Jewry.

== Work as business executive (1974–1982) ==
In 1974, he left government service to become executive vice president of Bechtel Group, a large engineering and services company. He was later its president and a director.

Under Shultz's leadership, Bechtel received contracts for many large construction projects, including from Saudi Arabia. In the year before he left Bechtel, the company reported a 50% increase in revenue.

== U.S. Secretary of State (1982–1989) ==
Shultz is one of only two individuals to have served in four United States Cabinet positions within the United States government, the other having been Elliot Richardson.

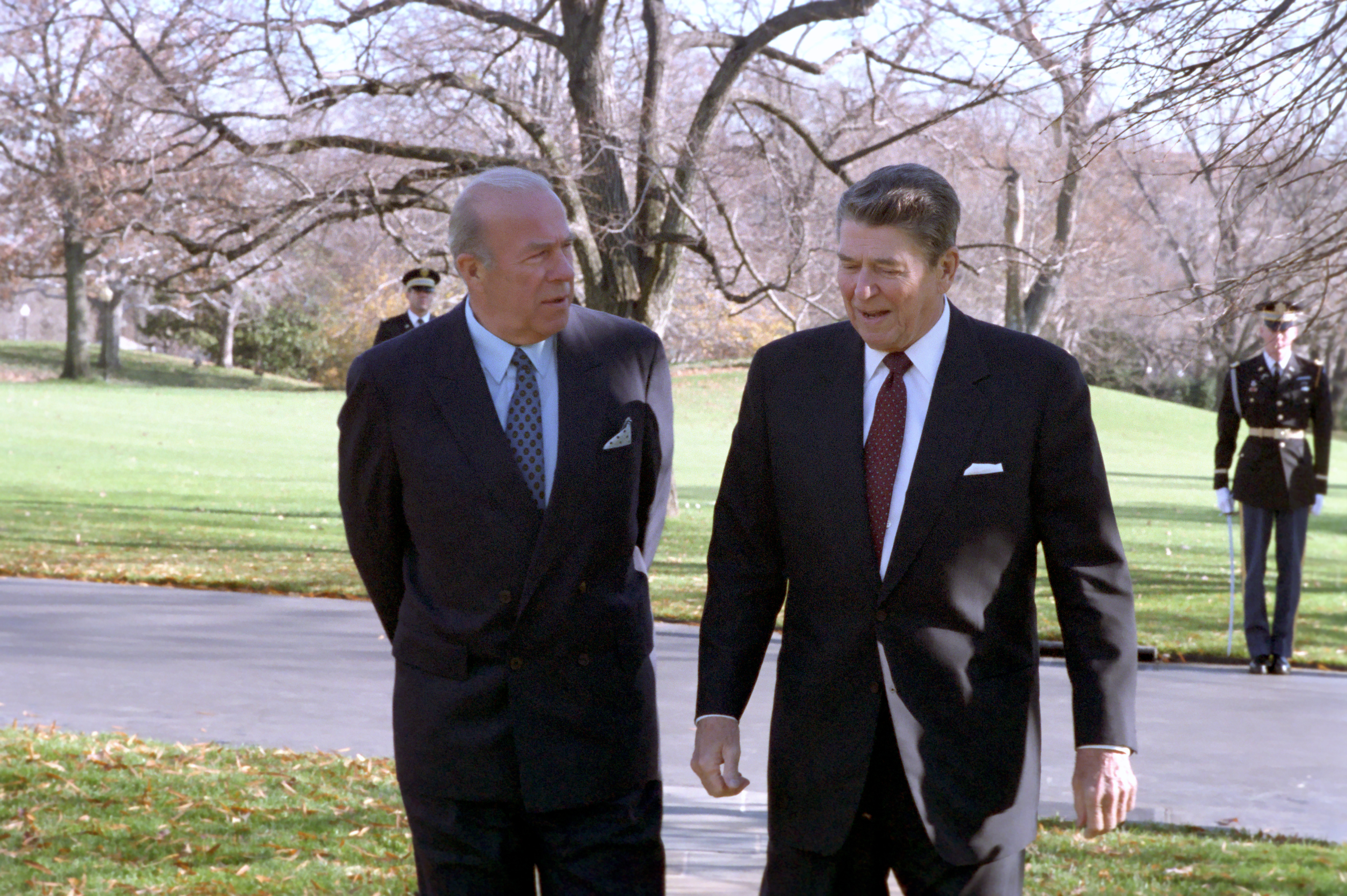
Shultz with President Ronald Reagan outside the Oval Office, December 1986

On July 16, 1982, Shultz was appointed by President Ronald Reagan as the 60th U.S. Secretary of State, replacing Alexander Haig, who had resigned. Shultz served for six and a half years, the longest tenure since Dean Rusk's. The possibility of a conflict of interest in his position as secretary of state after being in the upper management of the Bechtel Group was raised by several senators during his confirmation hearings. Shultz briefly lost his temper in response to some questions on the subject but was nevertheless unanimously confirmed by the Senate.

Shultz relied primarily on the Foreign Service to formulate and implement Reagan's foreign policy. As reported in the State Department's official history, "by the summer of 1985, Shultz had personally selected most of the senior officials in the Department, emphasizing professional over political credentials in the process [...] The Foreign Service responded in kind by giving Shultz its 'complete support,' making him one of the most popular Secretaries since Dean Acheson." Shultz's success came from not only the respect he earned from the bureaucracy but the strong relationship he forged with Reagan, who trusted him completely.

Diplomatic historian Walter LaFeber states that Shultz's 1993 memoir, Turmoil and Triumph: My Years as Secretary of State, "is the most detailed, vivid, outspoken, and reliable record we probably shall have of the 1980s until the documents are opened".

=== Relations with Europe and the Soviet Union ===
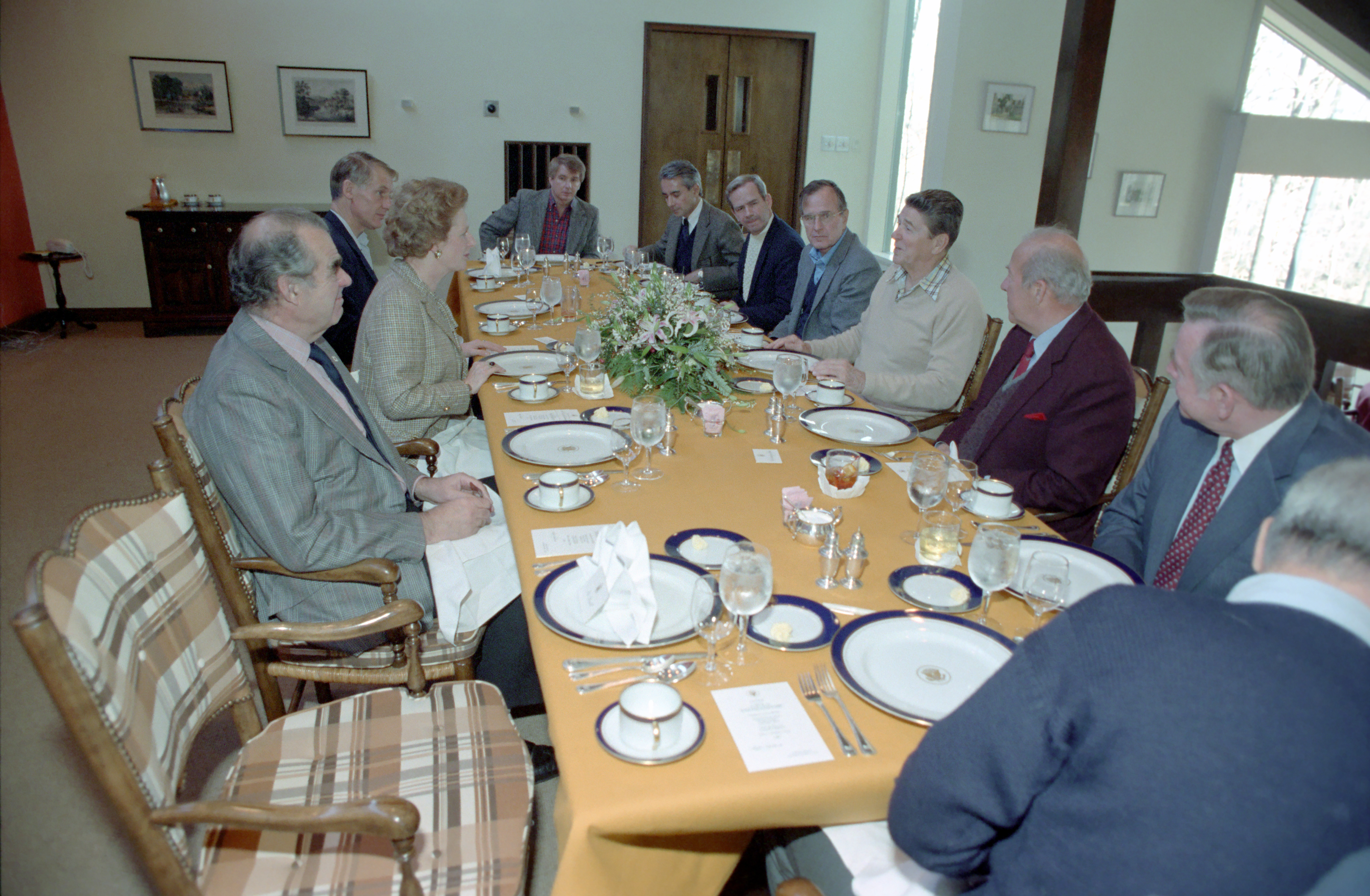
President Reagan with British Prime Minister Margaret Thatcher, Vice President George H. W. Bush, Robert McFarlane and Shultz during a working luncheon at Camp David in December 1984

By the summer of 1982, relations were strained not only between Washington and Moscow but also between Washington and key capitals in Western Europe. In response to the imposition of martial law in Poland the previous December, the Reagan administration had imposed sanctions on a pipeline between West Germany and the Soviet Union. European leaders vigorously protested sanctions that damaged their interests but not U.S. interests in grain sales to the Soviet Union. Shultz resolved this "poisonous problem" in December 1982, when the United States agreed to abandon sanctions against the pipeline and the Europeans agreed to adopt stricter controls on strategic trade with the Soviets.

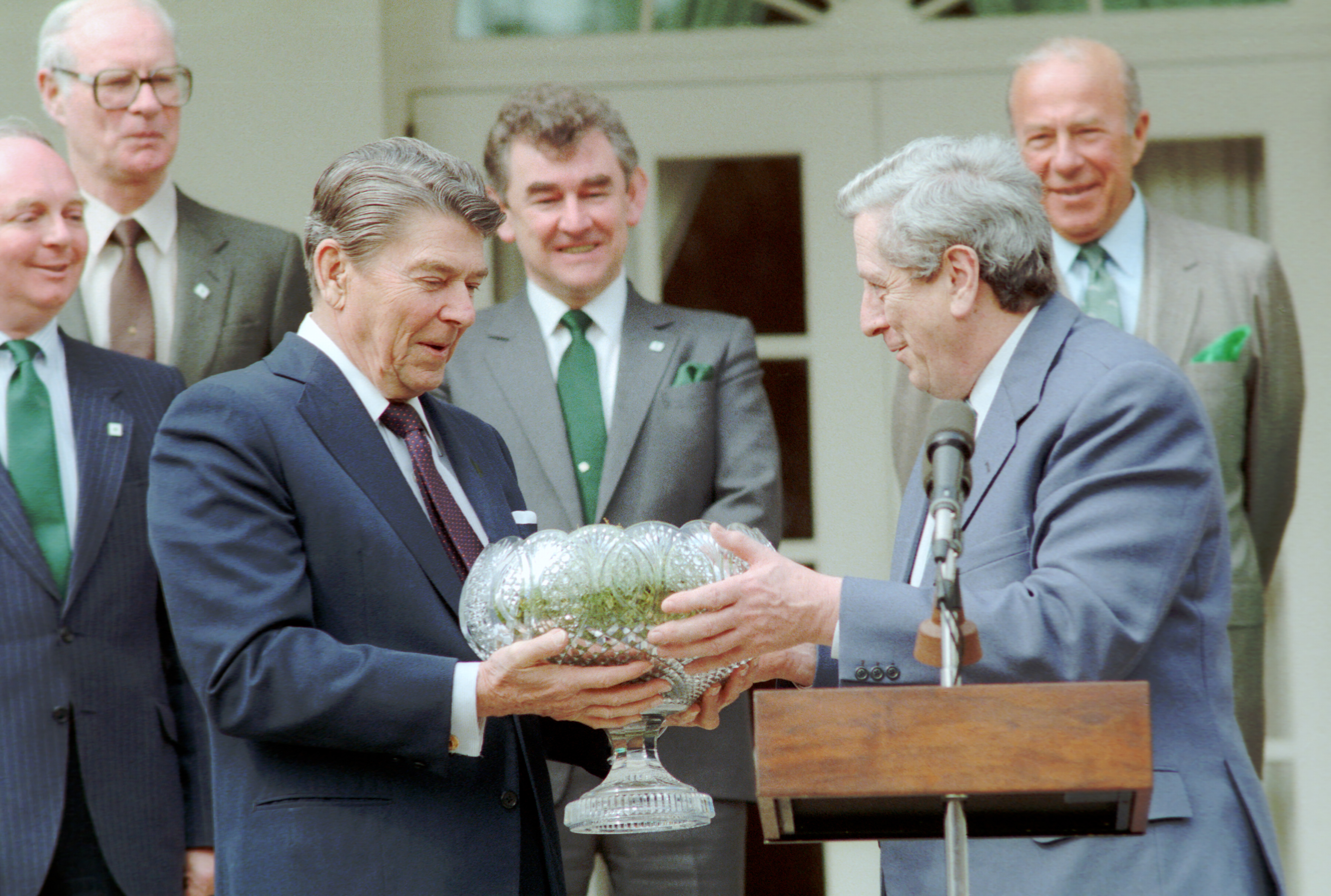
Shultz (far right) with President Reagan and Irish prime minister Garret FitzGerald at the White House in 1986

A more controversial issue was the NATO Ministers' 1979 "dual track" decision: if the Soviets refused to remove their SS-20 medium range ballistic missiles within four years, then the Allies would deploy a countervailing force of cruise and Pershing II missiles in Western Europe. When negotiations on these intermediate nuclear forces (INF) stalled, 1983 became a year of protest. Shultz and other Western leaders worked hard to maintain allied unity amidst anti-nuclear demonstrations in Europe and the United States. In spite of Western protests and Soviet propaganda, the allies began deployment of the missiles as scheduled in November 1983.

U.S.–Soviet tensions were raised by the announcement in March 1983 of the Strategic Defense Initiative, and exacerbated by the Soviet shoot-down of Korean Air Lines Flight 007 near Moneron Island on September 1. Tensions reached a height with the Able Archer 83 exercises in November 1983, during which the Soviets feared a pre-emptive American attack.

Following the missile deployment and the exercises, both Shultz and Reagan resolved to seek further dialogue with the Soviets.

When General Secretary Mikhail Gorbachev of the Soviet Union came to power in 1985, Shultz advocated that Reagan pursue a personal dialogue with him. Reagan gradually changed his perception of Gorbachev's strategic intentions in 1987, when the two leaders signed the Intermediate Range Nuclear Forces Treaty. The treaty, which eliminated an entire class of missiles in Europe, was a milestone in the history of the Cold War. Although Gorbachev took the initiative, Reagan was well prepared by the State Department to negotiate.

Two more events in 1988 persuaded Shultz that Soviet intentions were changing. First, the Soviet Union's initial withdrawal from Afghanistan indicated that the Brezhnev Doctrine was dead. "If the Soviets left Afghanistan, the Brezhnev Doctrine would be breached, and the principle of 'never letting go' would be violated", Shultz reasoned. The second event, according to Keren Yarhi-Milo of Princeton University, happened during the 19th Communist Party Conference, "at which Gorbachev proposed major domestic reforms such as the establishment of competitive elections with secret ballots; term limits for elected officials; separation of powers with an independent judiciary; and provisions for freedom of speech, assembly, conscience, and the press." The proposals indicated that Gorbachev was making revolutionary and irreversible changes.

=== Relations with China ===
Shultz inherited negotiations with the People's Republic of China over Taiwan from his predecessor. Under the terms of the Taiwan Relations Act, the United States was obligated to assist in Taiwan's defense, which included the sale of arms. The Administration debate on Taiwan, especially over the sale of military aircraft, resulted in a crisis in relations with China, which was alleviated only in August 1982, when, after months of arduous negotiations, the United States and the PRC issued a joint communiqué on Taiwan in which the United States agreed to limit arms sales to Taiwan and China agreed to seek a "peaceful solution".

=== Middle East diplomacy ===
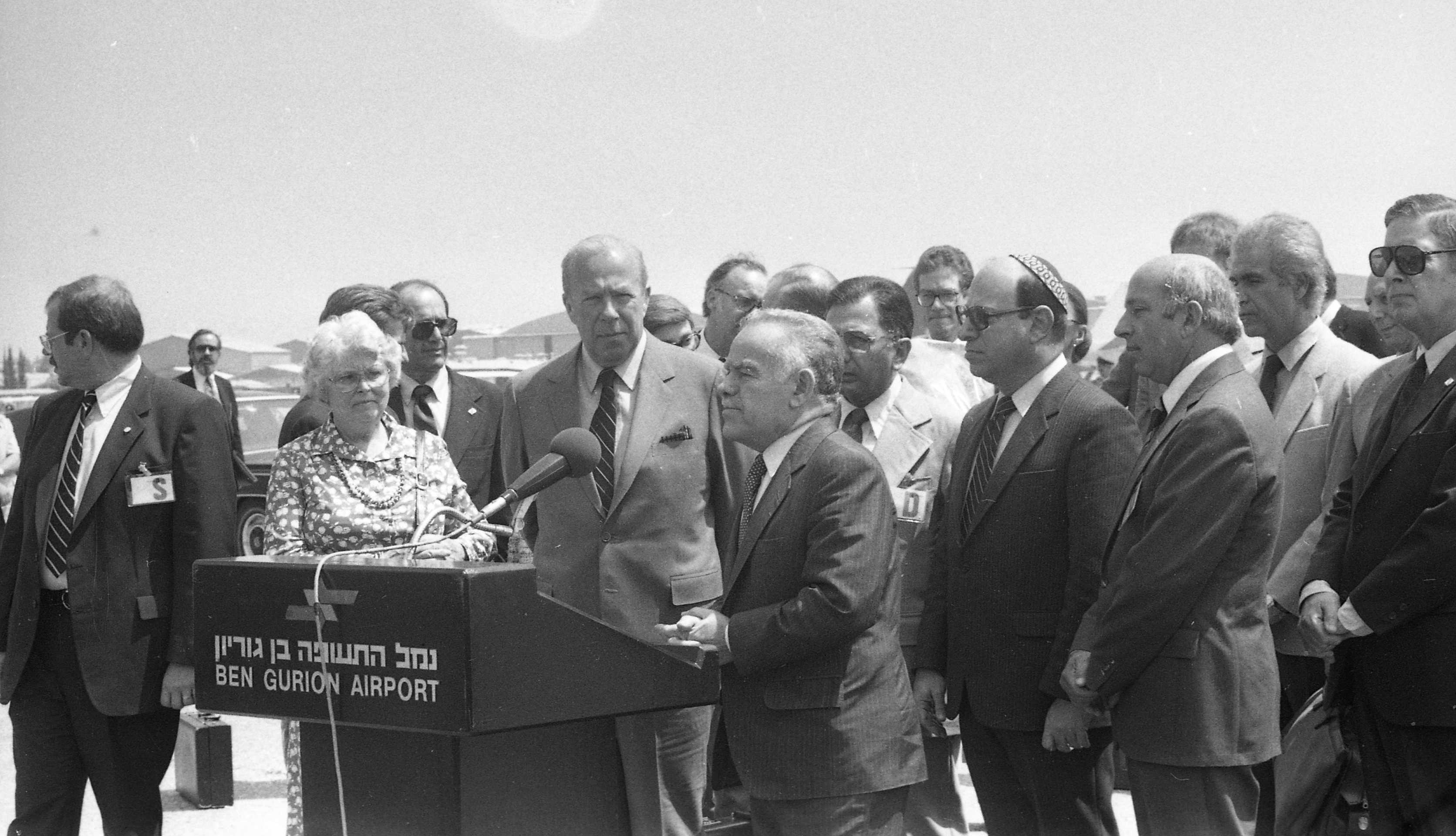
Shultz in Israel for talks in 1983

In response to the escalating violence of the Lebanese civil war, Reagan sent a Marine contingent to protect the Palestinian refugee camps and support the Lebanese Government. The October 1983 bombing of the Marine barracks in Beirut killed 241 U.S. servicemen, after which the deployment came to an ignominious end. Shultz subsequently negotiated an agreement between Israel and Lebanon and convinced Israel to begin partial withdrawal of its troops in January 1985 despite Lebanon's contravention of the settlement.

During the First Intifada (see Arab–Israeli conflict), Shultz "proposed ... an international convention in April 1988 ... on an interim autonomy agreement for the West Bank and Gaza Strip, to be implemented as of October for a three-year period". By December 1988, after six months of shuttle diplomacy, Shultz had established a diplomatic dialogue with the Palestine Liberation Organization, which was picked up by the next Administration.

=== Latin America ===
Shultz was known for outspoken opposition to the "arms for hostages" scandal that would eventually become known as the Iran-Contra Affair. In 1983 testimony before Congress, he said that the Sandinista government in Nicaragua was "a very undesirable cancer in the area". He was also opposed to any negotiation with the government of Daniel Ortega: "Negotiations are a euphemism for capitulation if the shadow of power is not cast across the bargaining table."

== Later life ==
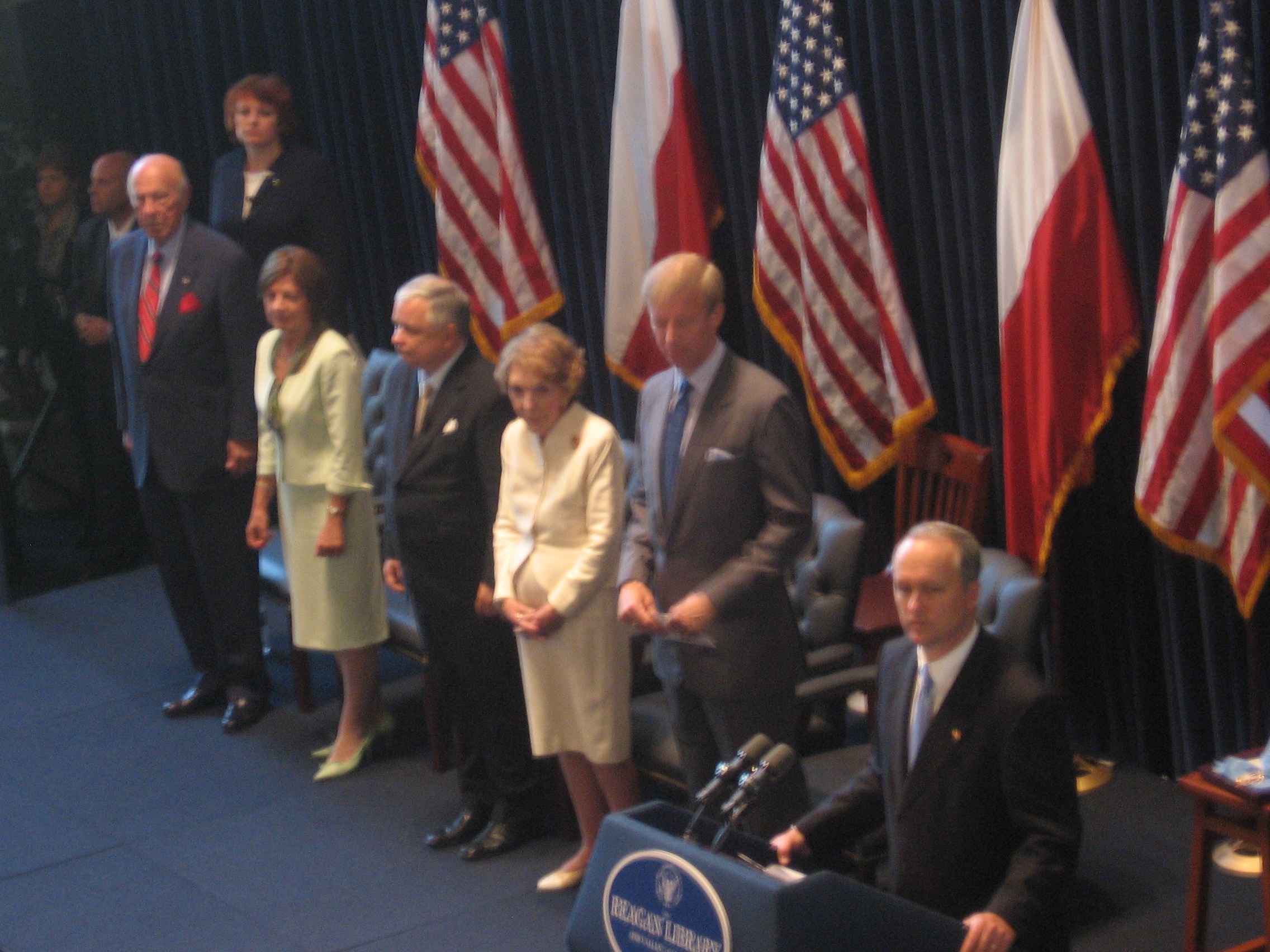
Shultz (far left) in 2007 with Polish president Lech Kaczyński and his wife, Maria Kaczyńska, as well as former U.S. First Lady Nancy Reagan (center, second from right)

After leaving public office in 1989, Shultz became a faculty member at Stanford University's Graduate School of Business, where he taught international economics. He "retained an iconoclastic streak" and publicly opposed some positions taken by fellow Republicans. He called the war on drugs a failure, and added his signature to an advertisement printed in The New York Times in 1998, headlined "We believe the global war on drugs is now causing more harm than drug abuse itself." In 2011, he was part of the Global Commission on Drug Policy, which called for a public health and harm reduction approach towards drug use, alongside Kofi Annan, Paul Volcker, and George Papandreou.

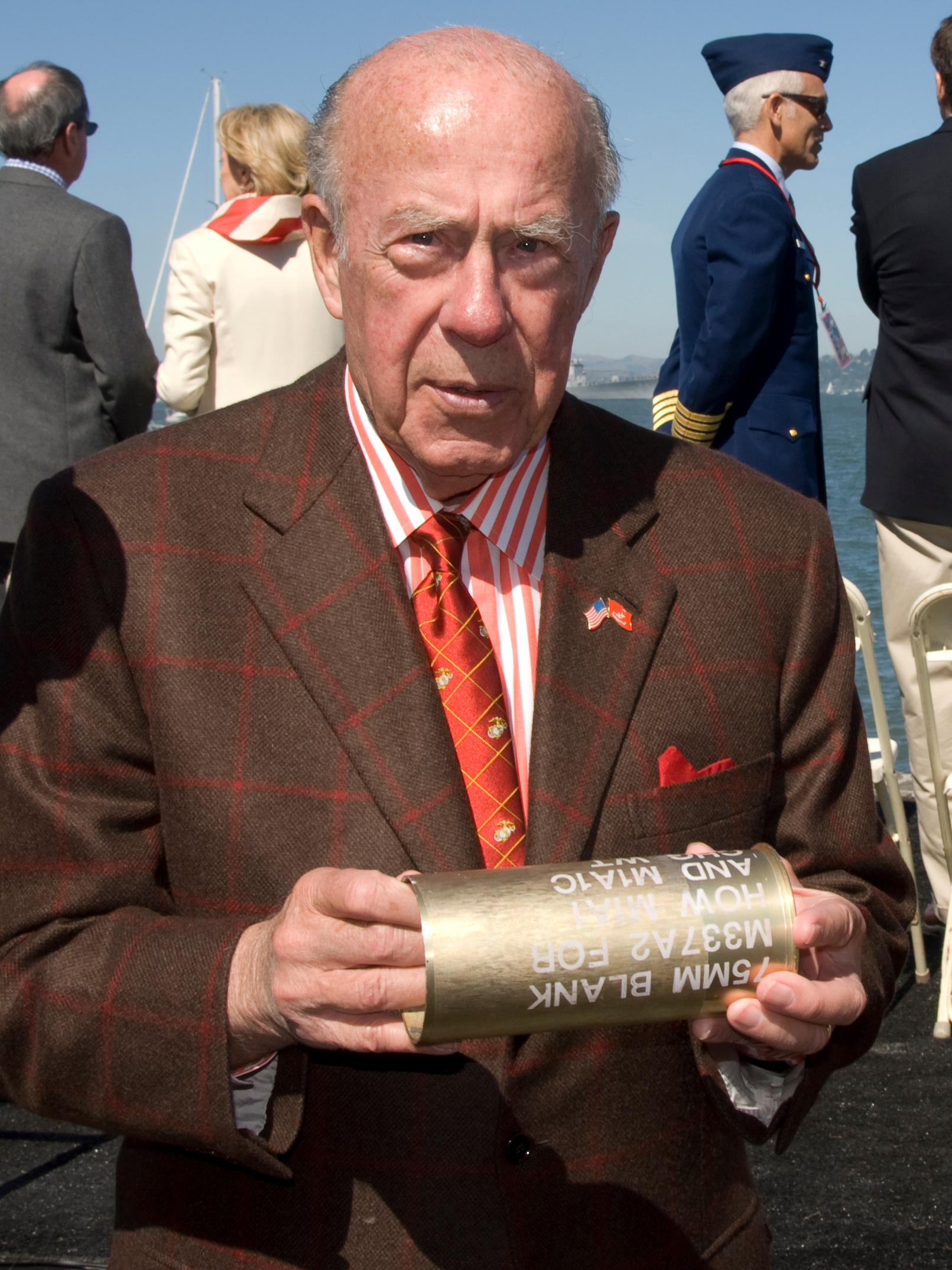
Shultz in 2007

Shultz was an early advocate of the presidential candidacy of George W. Bush, whose father, George H. W. Bush, was Reagan's vice president and his successor to the presidency. In April 1998, Shultz hosted a meeting at which George W. Bush discussed his views with policy experts including Michael Boskin, John Taylor, and Condoleezza Rice, who were evaluating possible Republican candidates to run for president in 2000. At the end of the meeting, the group felt they could support Bush's candidacy, and Shultz encouraged him to enter the race.

He then served as an informal advisor for Bush's presidential campaign during the 2000 election and a senior member of the "Vulcans", a group of policy mentors for Bush that also included Rice, Dick Cheney, and Paul Wolfowitz. One of his most senior advisors and confidants was former ambassador Charles Hill. Shultz has been called the father of the "Bush Doctrine" and generally defended the Bush administration's foreign policy. Shultz supported the 2003 invasion of Iraq, writing in support of U.S. military action months before the war began.

In a 2008 interview with Charlie Rose, Shultz spoke out against the U.S. embargo against Cuba, saying that U.S. sanctions against the island country were "ridiculous" in the post-Soviet world and that U.S. engagement with Cuba was a better strategy.

In 2003, Shultz served as co-chair (along with Warren Buffett) of California's Economic Recovery Council, an advisory group to the campaign of California gubernatorial candidate Arnold Schwarzenegger.

In later life, Shultz continued to be a strong advocate for nuclear arms control. In a 2008 interview, Shultz said: "Now that we know so much about these weapons and their power, they're almost weapons that we wouldn't use, so I think we would be better off without them." In January 2008, Shultz co-authored (with William Perry, Henry Kissinger, and Sam Nunn) an op-ed in The Wall Street Journal that called on governments to embrace the vision of a world free of nuclear weapons. The four created the Nuclear Threat Initiative to advance this agenda, focused on both preventing nuclear terrorist attacks and a nuclear war between world powers. In 2010, the four were featured in the documentary film Nuclear Tipping Point, which discussed their agenda.

In January 2011, Shultz wrote a letter to President Barack Obama urging him to pardon Jonathan Pollard. He stated, "I am impressed that the people who are best informed about the classified material Pollard passed to Israel, former CIA Director James Woolsey and former Chairman of the Senate Intelligence Committee Dennis DeConcini, favor his release".

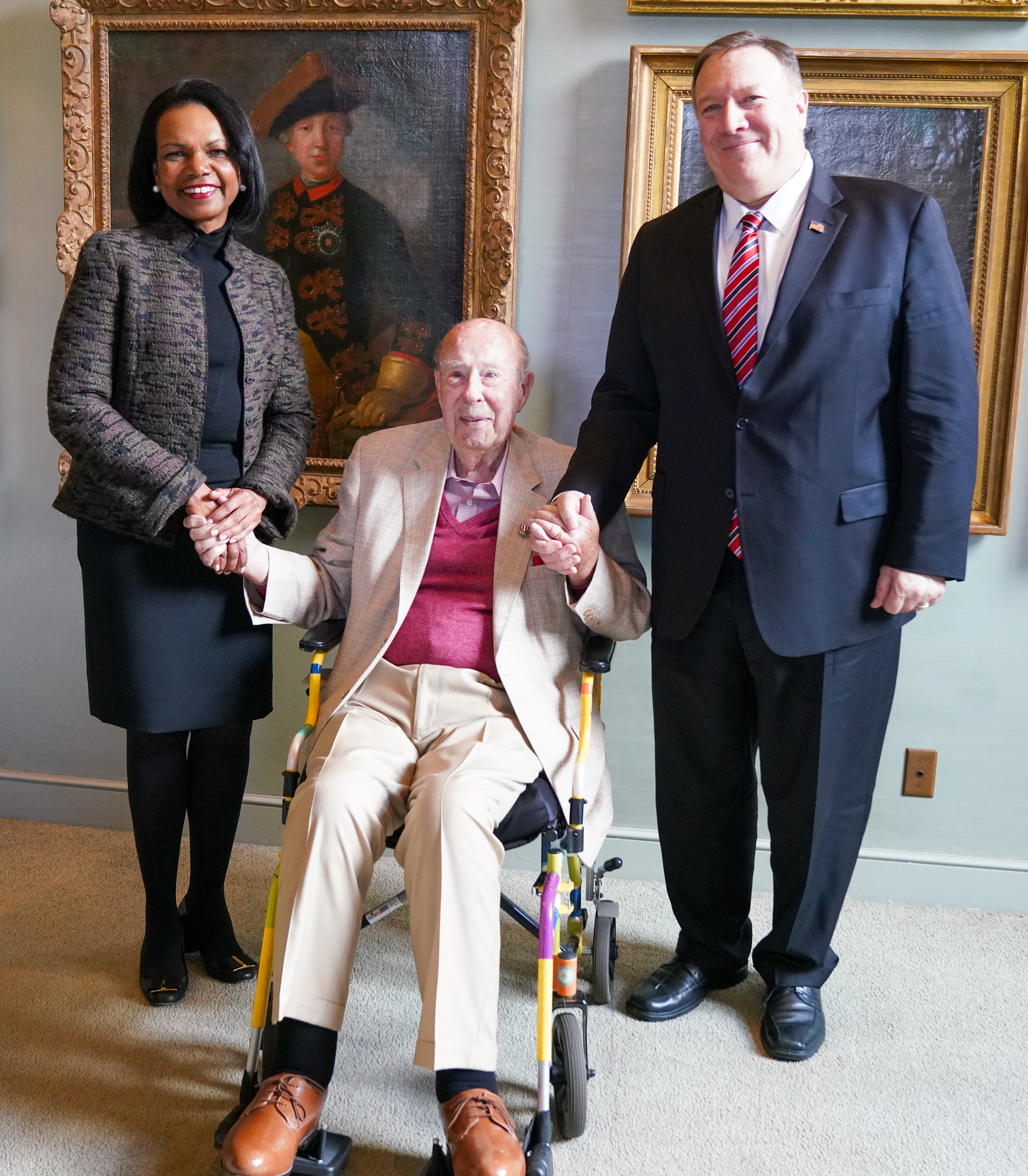
Shultz with Mike Pompeo and Condoleezza Rice in 2020

Shultz was a prominent advocate of efforts to fight anthropogenic climate change. Shultz favored a revenue-neutral carbon tax (i.e., a carbon fee and dividend program, in which carbon dioxide emissions are taxed and the net funds received are rebated to taxpayers) as the most economically efficient means of mitigating climate change. In April 2013, he co-wrote, with economist Gary Becker, an op-ed in the Wall Street Journal that concluded that this plan would "benefit all Americans by eliminating the need for costly energy subsidies while promoting a level playing field for energy producers." He repeated this call in a September 2014 talk at MIT and a March 2015 op-ed in The Washington Post. In 2014, Shultz joined the advisory board of the Citizens' Climate Lobby, and in 2017, Shultz cofounded the Climate Leadership Council, along with George H. W. Bush's Secretary of State James Baker and George W. Bush's Secretary of the Treasury Henry Paulson. In 2017, these Republican elder statesmen, along with Martin S. Feldstein and N. Gregory Mankiw, urged conservatives to embrace a carbon fee and dividend program.

In 2016, Shultz was one of eight former Treasury secretaries who called on the United Kingdom to remain a member of the European Union ahead of the "Brexit" referendum.

=== Theranos scandal ===
From 2011 to 2015, Shultz was a member of the board of directors of Theranos, a health technology company that became known for its false claims to have devised revolutionary blood tests. He was a prominent figure in the ensuing scandal. After joining the company's board in November 2011, he recruited other political figures, including former secretary of state Henry Kissinger, former secretary of defense William Perry, and former U.S. senator Sam Nunn. Shultz also promoted Theranos founder Elizabeth Holmes at major forums, including Stanford University's Institute for Economic Policy Research (SIEPR), and was on record supporting her in major media publications. This helped Holmes in her efforts to raise money from investors.

Shultz's grandson, Tyler Shultz, joined Theranos in September 2013 after graduating from Stanford University with a degree in biology. Tyler was forced to leave the company in 2014 after raising concerns about its testing practices with Holmes and his grandfather. George Shultz initially did not believe Tyler's warnings and pressured him to keep quiet. Shultz continued to advocate for Holmes and Theranos. Tyler eventually contacted reporter John Carreyrou (who went on to expose the scandal in The Wall Street Journal), but as summarized by ABC Nightline, "it wasn't long before Theranos got wind of it and attempted to use George Shultz to silence his grandson." Tyler went to his grandfather's house to discuss the allegations, but was surprised to encounter Theranos attorneys there, who pressured him to sign a document. Tyler did not sign any agreements, even though George pressured him to: "My grandfather would say, like, things like 'Your career would be ruined if [Carreyrou's] article comes out.'" Tyler and his parents spent nearly $500,000 on legal fees, selling their house to raise the funds, in fighting Theranos' accusations of violating the NDA and divulging trade secrets.

When media reports exposed controversial practices there in 2015, the company moved their non-technical directors like Shultz to a "Board of Counselors" and replaced them with a technical board. In 2016 Theranos' "Board of Counselors" was "retired". Theranos was shut down on September 4, 2018.

Although George Shultz praised his grandson in statements to media, according to Tyler, he never directly apologized for his involvement with Theranos.

=== Other memberships held ===
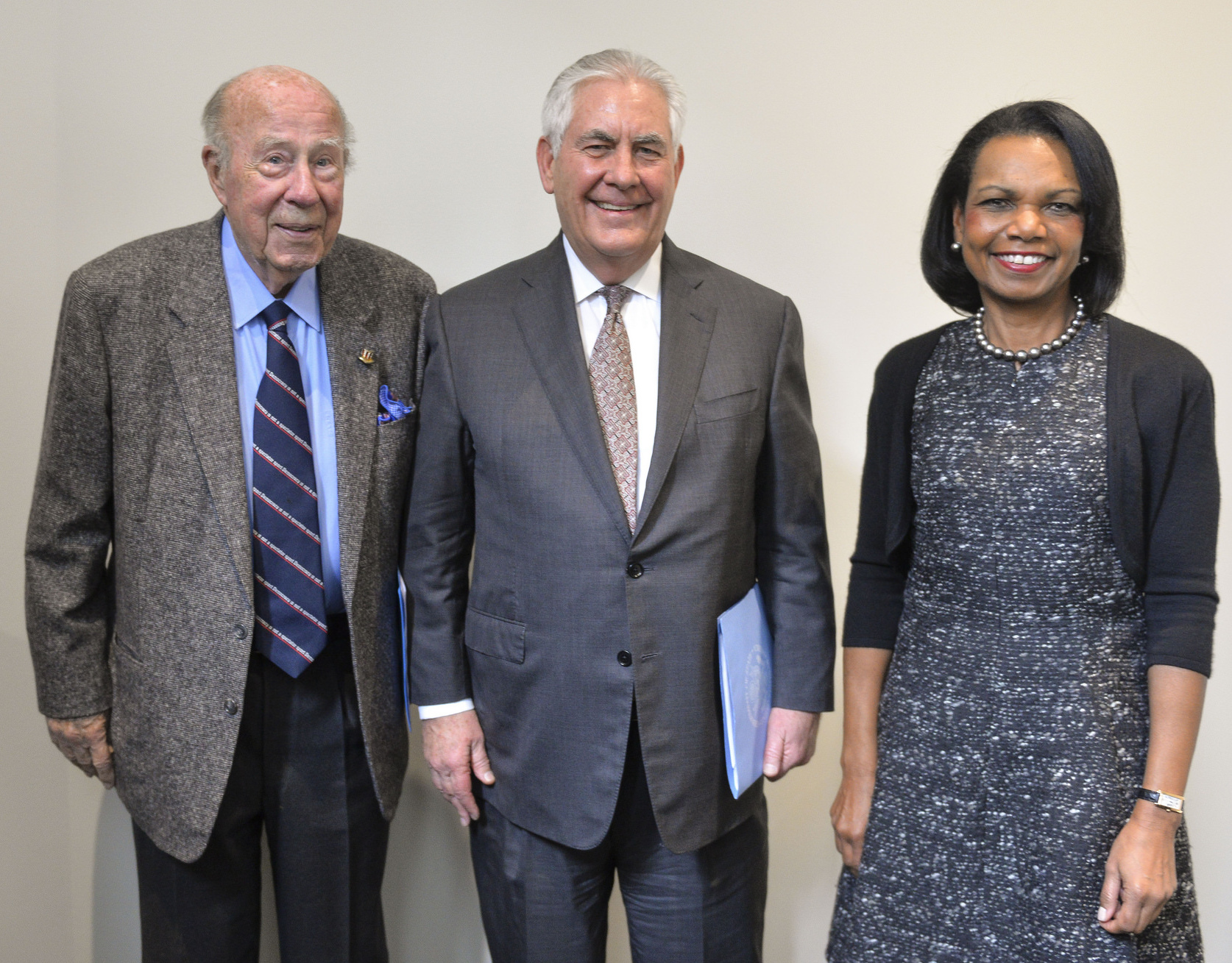
Shultz with Rex Tillerson and Condoleezza Rice in 2018

Shultz had a long affiliation at the Hoover Institution at Stanford University, where he was a distinguished fellow and, beginning in 2011, the Thomas W. and Susan B. Ford Distinguished Fellow; from 2018 until his death, Shultz hosted events on governance at the institution. Shultz was chairman of JPMorgan Chase's international advisory council. He was co-chairman of the conservative Committee on the Present Danger.

He was an honorary director of the Institute for International Economics. He was a member of the Washington Institute for Near East Policy (WINEP) board of advisors, the New Atlantic Initiative, the Mandalay Camp at the Bohemian Grove, and the Committee for the Liberation of Iraq. He served as an advisory board member for the Partnership for a Secure America and Citizens' Climate Lobby. He was honorary chairman of the Israel Democracy Institute. Shultz was a member of the advisory board of Spirit of America, a 501(c)(3) organization.

Shultz served on the board of directors of the Bechtel Corporation until 1996. He served on the board of Gilead Sciences from 1996 to 2005. Shultz sat on the board of directors of Xyleco and Accretive Health.

Together again with former secretary of defense William Perry, Shultz was serving on the board of Acuitus at the time of his death. And he has been member of the advisory board of the Peter G. Peterson Foundation.

== Personal life ==
While on a rest and recreation break in Hawaii from serving in the Marines in the Asiatic-Pacific Theater during World War II, Shultz met military nurse lieutenant Helena Maria O'Brien (1915–1995). They married on February 16, 1946, and had five children. O'Brien died of pancreatic cancer in 1995.

In 1997, Shultz married Charlotte Mailliard Swig, a prominent San Francisco philanthropist and socialite. They remained married until his death. Shultz was a member of an Episcopal church.

=== Death ===
Shultz died at age 100 at his home in Stanford, California, on February 6, 2021. He is buried next to his first wife at Dawes Cemetery in Cummington, Massachusetts.

President Joe Biden reacted to Shultz's death by saying, "He was a gentleman of honor and ideas, dedicated to public service and respectful debate, even into his 100th year on Earth. That's why multiple presidents, of both political parties, sought his counsel. I regret that, as president, I will not be able to benefit from his wisdom, as have so many of my predecessors."

== Honors and prizes ==
- 2016 – Presidential Medal of Honor, San Francisco State University
- 2014 – Honorary Reagan Fellow Award of Eureka College
- 2013 – Honorary Silver Medal of Jan Masaryk
- 2012 – Henry A. Kissinger Prize of the American Academy in Berlin
- 2011 – Honorary Officer of the Order of Australia
- 2010 – California Hall of Fame
- 2007 – Truman Medal for Economic Policy
- 2008 – Rumford Prize
- 2007 – Emma Lazarus Statue of Liberty Award
- 2006 – National World War II Museum, American Spirit Award
- 2005 – Lead21, Lifetime Achievement Award
- 2004 – American Whig-Cliosophic Society, James Madison Award for Distinguished Public Service
- 2004 – American Economic Association, Distinguished Fellow
- 2003 – Lifetime Contributions to American Diplomacy Award, American Foreign Service Association
- 2002 – Reagan Distinguished American Award
- 2002 – Ralph Bunche Award
- American Philosophical Society
- Elliot Richardson Prize
- John Witherspoon Medal

- 2001 – Eisenhower Medal for Leadership
- 2000 – Woodrow Wilson Award for Public Service
- 1996 – Koret Prize
- 1992 – Seoul Peace Prize (Korea)
- 1992 – United States Military Academy, Sylvanus Thayer Award
- 1989 – Presidential Medal of Freedom
- 1989 – Order of the Rising Sun with Paulownia Flowers, Grand Cordon (Japan)
- 1986 – Freedoms Foundation, George Washington Medal
- 1986 – U.S. Senator John Heinz Award (Jefferson Awards) For Public Service
- 1970 – Fellow of the American Academy of Arts and Sciences

=== Honorary degrees ===
Honorary degrees were conferred on Shultz from the universities of Columbia, Notre Dame, Loyola, Pennsylvania, Rochester, Princeton, Carnegie Mellon, City University of New York, Yeshiva, Northwestern, Technion, Tel Aviv, Weizmann Institute of Science, Baruch College of New York, Williams College, Hebrew University of Jerusalem, Tbilisi State University in the Republic of Georgia, and Keio University in Tokyo.

== Selected works ==
- Shultz, George P. and Goodby, James E. The War that Must Never be Fought, Hoover Press, ISBN 978-0-8179-1845-3, 2015.
- Shultz, George P. Issues on My Mind: Strategies for the Future, Hoover Institution Press, ISBN 9780817916244, 2013.
- Shultz, George P. and Shoven, John B. Putting Our House in Order: A Guide to Social Security and Health Care Reform. New York: W.W. Norton, ISBN 9780393069617, 2008
- Shultz, George P. Economics in Action: Ideas, Institutions, Policies, Hoover Institution on War, Revolution and Peace, Stanford University, ISBN 9780817956332, 1995.
- Shultz, George P. Turmoil and Triumph: My Years as Secretary of State, New York: Scribner's, ISBN 9781451623116, 1993.
- Shultz, George P. U.S. Policy and the Dynamism of the Pacific; Sharing the Challenges of Success, East-West Center (Honolulu), Pacific Forum, and the Pacific and Asian Affairs Council, 1988.
- The U.S. and Central America: Implementing the National Bipartisan Commission Report: Report to the President from the Secretary of State, U.S. Department of State (Washington, D.C.), 1986.
- Risk, Uncertainty, and Foreign Economic Policy, D. Davies Memorial Institute of International Studies, 1981.
- (With Kenneth W. Dam) Economic Policy beyond the Headlines, Stanford Alumni Association, ISBN 9780226755991, 1977.
- Shultz, George P. Leaders and Followers in an Age of Ambiguity, New York University Press (New York), ISBN 0814777651, 1975.
- (With Albert Rees) Workers and Wages in an Urban Labor Market, University of Chicago Press, ISBN 0226707059, 1970.
- (With Arnold R. Weber) Strategies for the Displaced Worker: Confronting Economic Change, Harper (New York), ISBN 97808371885531966.
- (Editor and author of introduction, with Robert Z. Aliber) Guidelines, Informal Controls, and the Market Place: Policy Choices in a Full Employment Economy, University of Chicago Press (Chicago), 1966.
- (Editor, with Thomas Whisler) Management Organization and the Computer, Free Press (New York), 1960.
- Automation, a new dimension to old problems by George P. Shultz and George Benedict Baldwin (Washington: Public Affairs Press, 1955).
- (Editor, with John R. Coleman) Labor Problems: Cases and Readings, McGraw (New York), 1953.
- Pressures on Wage Decisions: A Case Study in the Shoe Industry, Wiley (New York), ASIN B0000CHZNP 1951.
- (With Charles Andrew Myers) The Dynamics of a Labor Market: A Study of the Impact of Employment Changes on Labor Mobility, Job Satisfaction, and Company and Union Policies, Prentice-Hall (Englewood Cliffs, NJ), ISBN 9780837186207,1951.

== See also ==
- Foreign policy of the Reagan administration
- International Conference on Nuclear Disarmament
- Nuclear Tipping Point

Academic offices
Preceded by W. Allen Wallis	Dean of the Booth School of Business; 1962–1969	Succeeded by Sidney Davidson
Political offices
Preceded by W. Willard Wirtz	United States Secretary of Labor; 1969–1970	Succeeded by James Day Hodgson
Preceded by Bob Mayo as Director of the Bureau of the Budget	Director of the Office of Management and Budget; 1970–1972	Succeeded by Caspar Weinberger
Preceded by John Connally	United States Secretary of the Treasury; 1972–1974	Succeeded by William E. Simon
Preceded by Alexander Haig	United States secretary of state 1982–1989	Succeeded by James Baker
