= Napster (streaming service) =

Rhapsody music streaming service post-2016 rebranding

- 2022 logo
- Formerly: Rhapsody (2001–03, 2004–16); RealOne Rhapsody (2003–04); RealRhapsody (2004)
- Industry: Music; Broadcasting
- Predecessor: TuneTo.com (1999–2001); Napster (pay service)
- Founded: December 3, 2001; 24 years ago (as Rhapsody)
- Founder: Rob Reid
- Headquarters: Seattle, Washington, United States
- Area served: 33 countries: United States; Andorra; Argentina; Austria; Brazil; Canada; Chile; Colombia; Costa Rica; Denmark; Ecuador; El Salvador; Finland; France; Germany; Greece; Guatemala; Ireland; Italy; Luxembourg; Mexico; Monaco; Netherlands; Nicaragua; Norway; Panama; Peru; Portugal; Spain; Sweden; Switzerland; United Kingdom; Uruguay
- Key people: Jon Vlassopulos (CEO)
- Brands: Napster
- Owner: Listen.com (2001–03); RealNetworks (2003–10); Rhapsody International, Inc. (2010–20); Napster Group PLC (2020–22); Hivemind (co-owner, 2022–25); Algorand (co-owner, 2022–25); Infinite Reality (2025–present)
- Website: napster.com

Napster was a music streaming service based in Seattle, Washington, United States.

Until 2016, the service was known domestically as Rhapsody before rebranding as Napster, the same name brand that was used by Roxio's Napster. On March 25, 2025, it was sold to Infinite Reality.

In August 2025, Napster faced a lawsuit for $9 million of unpaid royalties by Sony Music and their catalog of music was pulled from the service, the app continued to lose more licensed music for months afterwards.

Napster became a generative AI media creator with virtual assistant services, in January 2026.

== Overview ==
Napster started as an audio search engine named Aladdin that was purchased by Listen.com in May 2001 and became the basis for its new streaming service, called Rhapsody, that launched in December of the same year.

Based on the Open Music Model principles, Rhapsody was the first streaming on-demand music subscription service to offer unlimited access to a large library of digital music for a flat monthly fee. In August 2003, internet media company RealNetworks, anticipating the launch of Apple's iTunes Store, acquired Rhapsody.

On April 6, 2010, Rhapsody relaunched as a standalone company, separate from former parent RealNetworks. On August 25, 2020, Rhapsody International and the Napster name were sold for $70 million to virtual reality concerts company MelodyVR, which renamed itself Napster Group PLC following the takeover.

On May 10, 2022, Napster was sold to Hivemind and Algorand. Since 2025, it belongs to Infinite Reality.

== History ==
=== Early days ===
Rhapsody started as Listen.com in 1999, a music search engine, founded by Rob Reid, and a core founding team of Nick Tangborn, Sean Ryan, Dave Williams, Ranah Edelin and Niranjan Nagar. Listen.com developed an exhaustive music database allowing it not only serve content references for all the major bands, but also developed a key technology allowing it to link to music legally available on the web that fans of major bands and artists would enjoy. This allowed it to syndicate music search for all the major search portals.

Also in 1999, Tim Bratton, J.P. Lester, Sylvain Rebaud, Alexandre Brouaux, Nick Sincaglia and Dave Lampton were working on a new streaming audio engine. This engine was commercially deployed in the TuneTo.com customized radio service, and was also used in their "celestial jukebox" prototype, called Aladdin.

Listen.com acquired TuneTo.com in 2000 and integrated the music database, along with the core technology from TuneTo.com to create the foundation of the Rhapsody music service.

=== Rhapsody ===
In April 2001, TuneTo.com was acquired by Listen.com, a startup founded in San Francisco by author and entrepreneur Rob Reid, that had built a large online music directory. Aladdin was transformed into the Rhapsody music service during the summer and fall of 2001 and was launched on December 3, 2001.

Rhapsody was the first streaming on-demand music subscription service to offer unlimited access to a large library of digital music for a flat monthly fee, a concept advocated by business theories such as the Open Music Model. At launch, Rhapsody's library was formed of content mostly from Naxos Records and several independent labels. Over the next several months of 2002, they secured licenses from EMI, BMG, Warner Bros. Records, and Sony to add their music to the service. In July 2002, Rhapsody added Universal Records to their catalog, signing the last of the five major record labels of the time.

RealNetworks announced plans to acquire Listen.com on April 21, 2003, one week before the launch of the iTunes Music Store on April 28, 2003. The transaction closed on August 3, 2003. The Rhapsody service was briefly known as RealRhapsody shortly after the acquisition, but was since shortened back to "Rhapsody".

By 2004, some blogs providing sharing of playlists with comments, with names such as "Rhapsody Radish". In late 2007, Music On the Go (MOG) partnered with Rhapsody to allow Rhapsody subscribers to access all of Rhapsody's content through MOG. In August 2007, RealNetworks formed a joint venture with Viacom's music network MTV named Rhapsody America. The underpinning software running the service would come from MTV's Urge, a discontinued music service MTV developed in partnership with Microsoft.

=== Spinoff ===
In February 2010, RealNetworks announced their intention to restructure Rhapsody into a fully independent business. Recent problems with the online music subscription service prompted the CEO to make "crucial decisions and think some things through". During this period, dropping the subscription service was considered, but he felt it wasn't the right decision at the time. Instead, the whole Rhapsody team thought of ways to revamp the struggling company and in turn dropped RealNetworks as parent of the company. This was a very risky decision, as the company needed the support, but gained the support of MTV Networks and Viacom, and other independent companies. Since independence, Rhapsody has started the revamping process with a new logo and subscription price changes.

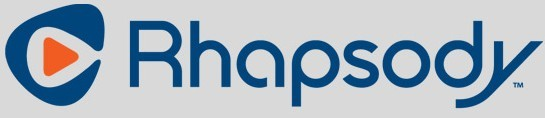
Rhapsody logo between 2010 and 2016, now used as a corporate identity

As of January 2011, Rhapsody president Jon Irwin told Reuters the on-demand subscription music service had more than 750,000 subscribers, having added more than 100,000 since becoming an independent company. At that date Rhapsody had a catalog of 11,000,000 songs.

On August 3, 2011, Rhapsody announced that from October 2011 they would no longer re-license DRMed music bought before three years.

On October 3, 2011, Rhapsody announced plans to acquire Napster with the deal to be completed by November.

On May 6, 2014, Rhapsody announced its parent company made its first outside investment and led a Series B round for Dubset Media, the operator of streaming music site Thefuture.fm. Terms of the deal were not disclosed.

On April 21, 2016, Rhapsody named its first CEO, Mike Davis. Davis is the first CEO of Rhapsody International, which is the parent company to Rhapsody and Napster.

=== Napster rebranding ===
On July 14, 2016, Rhapsody phased out the Rhapsody brand in favor of Napster and has since branded its service internationally as Napster.

=== Acquisition by MelodyVR ===
On August 25, 2020, Napster was sold to virtual reality concerts company MelodyVR.

=== Acquisition by Algorand ===
On May 10, 2022, Napster was sold to the blockchain company Algorand and the crypto-focused investment firm Hivemind. Following the sale, Emmy Lovell was announced as CEO of Napster.

On June 8, 2022, Napster released a new version of its music streaming app with refreshed branding.

On March 9, 2023, the UK trading entity Napster Music Limited entered liquidation following a winding up notice from HMRC.

=== Acquisition by Infinite Reality ===
On March 25, 2025, Napster was sold to Infinite Reality for $207 million. Following a 2025 lawsuit by Sony Music due to unpaid licensing fees, Napster removed its music library and announced a business model change to a subscription service for music produced by artificial intelligence with related hardware and software products.

== See also ==
- List of Internet radio stations
- List of online music databases
- Napster
- Napster (pay service)

== Notes ==
- Rhapsody: Perfecting the Pitch
