= Morgan Webb =

American television presenter and producer

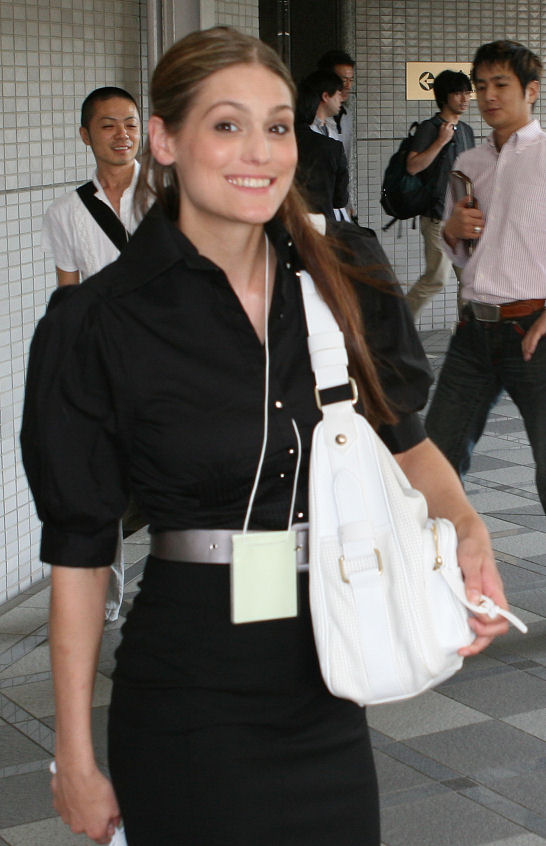
- Webb in 2007
- Born: October 5, 1978 (age 48)
- Occupations: Television presenter, producer
- Years active: 2001–present
- Spouse: Rob Reid (m. 2006)

Morgan Ailis Webb (born October 5, 1978) is a former co-host and senior segment producer of the G4 show X-Play. She was previously the host of the podcast WebbAlert and a monthly columnist for the United States edition of FHM, where she contributed a monthly video game column titled "Tips from the Gaming Goddess". She began working at independent game studio Bonfire Studios in March 2017 in a production role.

== Career ==
Raised in Los Angeles, Webb attended UC Berkeley from 1996 to 2000. She developed computer skills in her free time there, and after graduating from college worked for a dot-com company as a website administrator. After the company went under during the dot-com bubble burst of 2000, her friend Catherine Schwartz got her hired at TechTV in 2001, and Webb became employed as the associate producer and web researcher for The Screen Savers. Throughout 2002 and 2003, she also regularly co-hosted TechTV's Call for Help with Chris Pirillo. In April 2003, Webb left The Screen Savers to co-host X-Play with Adam Sessler.

Webb is one of the six TechTV personalities to survive the massive layoffs resulting from the May 2004 merger of G4 and TechTV. Only Adam Sessler and Webb remained with the network after G4's change in format. After Sessler's employment was terminated in April 2012, Webb was the only original TechTV personality remaining on the network.

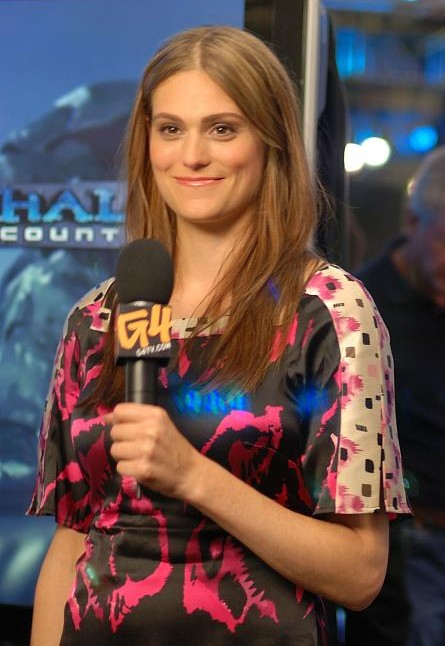
Morgan Webb during the Halo 3 launch in New York City, 2007

In August 2005, Webb became a contributing game columnist for FHM, alongside her regular hosting duties on X-Play. Her monthly column was titled "Tips from the Gaming Goddess". Readers were encouraged to email Webb their video-game-related inquiries; she would then answer one question each month. In February 2007, Webb wrote her final column for the magazine, which discontinued its U.S. publication in March. She also hosted the short-lived Free Stuff on G4.

From August 2, 2007, to January 25, 2009, Webb had a daily video blogging initiative called WebbAlert. These videos were 5 to 6 minutes in length, and each consisted of a recap of popular technology news of the day. On occasion, Webb departed from the regular news format in favor of an episode on one particular topic of interest. Examples included a recap of the annual TED Conference, a viral video special showcasing "future 'Darwin Award' winners", and tech-centric "Holiday Buyer's Guides". In January 2009, Webb suspended WebbAlert indefinitely due to issues with maintaining it on a daily basis concurrently with her hosting duties on X-Play.

On February 25, 2009, G4 announced that Webb would be the host of their new show G4 Underground, a weekly series that profiles a wide range of people and topics that are of interest to the "internet generation". It premiered March 29, 2009.

After airing more than 1300 episodes, X-Play aired its final episode on January 23, 2013.

From June 11, 2013, through June 13, 2013, Morgan co-anchored Microsoft's nightly Xbox @ E3 Live streaming event coverage on Xbox Live, reuniting her with former G4 personalities Kevin Pereira, Blair Herter, Jessica Chobot, Blair Butler and Tina Summerford.

Morgan worked as a consultant and creative advisor for Activision Blizzard, where she also produced and hosted Blizzard's now-defunct monthly World of Warcraft discussion program WoW Source.

In September 2017, Morgan announced her employment at Bonfire Studios where she helps organize the community and other various functions.

== Personal life ==
As an infant and small child, Webb appeared in advertisements for Gerber baby food, Kenner Toys, and an ad for McDonald's, where she recited the ingredients of the Big Mac to a game of Pat-a-cake. Though Webb's parents refused to let her watch television, she made up for it by playing video games. She began with an Atari, primarily the game Combat; however, as technology progressed, The Legend of Zelda and Phantasy Star became two of her favorite games.

After Webb graduated from high school, she left home to attend UC Berkeley. There, she earned a bachelor's degree in rhetoric (with a minor in Italian) in 2000.

On August 19, 2006, Webb married Rob Reid in a service at City Hall in San Francisco, California.

Webb has joined the web-series Acquisitions Incorporated in playing several Dungeons & Dragons games at live events like PAX West.

== Media appearances ==
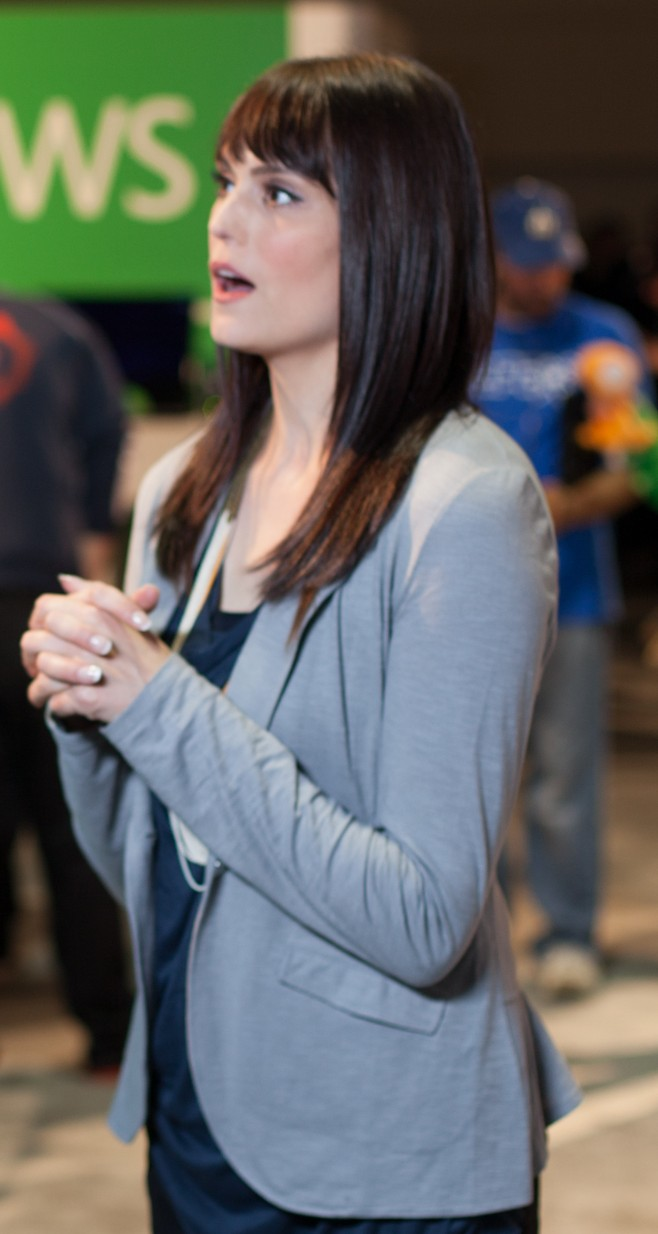
Webb at PAX Prime 2012

Throughout 2004 and beyond, Webb was featured in numerous issues of print publications. Maxim magazine spotlighted her in their July 2004 issue. FHM featured a five-page article in their November 2004 issue, and also had her listed in three consecutive years for their annual The 100 Sexiest Women in the World article: #73 in 2005, #62 in 2006, and #51 in 2007. Other magazines have featured her as well, voted "Hottest Woman of the Year" in RTD's 2006 Top 10 countdown and in an article in the fall 2006 edition of Colleges.com U Magazine.

In April 2004, Webb was in "TechTV's Sexiest Techie" poll sponsored by Playboy magazine. TechTV viewers could vote for their favorite girl via the Playboy website. Webb won the poll and was offered a nude photo shoot, but she refused, despite being "very flattered", citing her own personal reasons and her parents' objection to the idea.

Webb appeared in the music video "Strange New Element" from the band Low Water. She makes her appearance near the end of the video alongside other fellow TechTV personalities, including Catherine Schwartz, Sarah Lane, Laura Swisher, Chi-Lan Lieu, and Sumi Das. In addition to appearing in Low Water's music video, Webb is featured in the artwork of the band's album Hard Words in a Speakeasy. She additionally provided her own vocals for X-Play: The Musical, which aired in February 2007. She is a frequent guest on various talk shows, including The Tyra Banks Show (in February 2008), Chelsea Lately (in early 2009), and Late Night with Jimmy Fallon (on April 15, 2009). She was also a frequent co-host on G4's Attack of the Show!. On June 17, 2009, Webb appeared on KCRW Radio, as part of the station's Guest DJ Project.

On June 21, 2008, Webb along with her X-Play co-host Adam Sessler, participated in the 50th annual Hollywood Stars Celebrity Softball game at Dodger Stadium.

A YouTube video was posted on October 7, 2013, with Webb as the well-versed host of a "Patch 5.4 Developer Round Table" discussion with Blizzard Entertainment employees J. Allen Brack, Ion Hazzikostas, and Tom Chilton.

Webb played a minor role as Neely Lamm on the CBS TV drama series Bull on an episode titled "The Fall", which aired on February 7, 2017.
