= Year Zero (Reid novel) =

2012 science fiction novel by Robert Reid

- First edition
- Author: Robert Reid
- Language: English
- Genre: Science fiction
- Publisher: Del Rey Books
- Publication date: 2012

Year Zero is a 2012 science fiction novel by Robert Reid. It was published by Del Rey Books, with an audiobook version read by John Hodgman.

== Synopsis ==
Through a cosmic fluke, humans are the only species in the universe with genuine musical talent. As a result, when anthropologists from the intergalactic Refined League discover human music in 1977, the aesthetic shock revolutionizes their society (with 1977 becoming the Year Zero of their new calendar, thus the title), and quintillions of Refined citizens spend decades obsessively listening to hundreds of thousands of human songs. However, Refined law on cultural heritage mandates that the artworks of a given species must be enjoyed in contexts defined by that species—and human law on file sharing has established that the fine for illicit copies of songs is up to $150,000 per individual copy per song. As a result, the Refined consider themselves to be so deeply in debt to humans ("three trillion yottadollars") that—compared to bankrupting the entire universe—humanity's extinction might be preferable.

== Reception ==
Ars Technica described the novel as Swiftian, while the SF Site compared it to the works of Robert Sheckley and National Public Radio called it "smart and wacky".

Publishers Weekly considered it "shaky but funny", with "sharp" satirical content, but expressed concern that the characters were "thin", and that many of the background details could quickly—or had already—become dated. Strange Horizons assessed the worldbuilding as "surprisingly thorough" for a humorous novel; Entertainment Weekly, however, felt that the novel's "satiric strength" was lessened by the amount of detail which Reid invested into the various alien species.
