= Lead21 =

Conservative public policy and advocacy organization

Lead21 (formerly known as New Century Leadership Circle) is a conservative public policy and advocacy organization focused on entrepreneurship and technology innovation and is a separate organization from LEAD21 (https://lead-21.org) a leadership development program for land grant universities and partners. It was founded in the United States by several Silicon Valley entrepreneurs in 2001. The organization principally caters to entrepreneurial business leaders, aiming to promote policies that support and encourage prosperity through entrepreneurship and innovation.

Most of the Lead21 senior staff, board of directors and membership reportedly have very close connections to the Republican Party and many Republican administrations (especially Arnold Schwarzenegger's administration in California, and the Bush Administration). Lead21 reports having a multi-partisan donor and membership base, including Democratic members, with no "political litmus test" for membership. Like many right-of-center think tanks, it has no partisanship requirement, but is rooted in traditional conservative- and libertarian-leaning values such as limited government, lower taxes, and pro-market policies.

Lead21 was conceived on August 18, 2001, by Auren Hoffman and Price Roe, and shortly after founded with the additions of entrepreneurs Christopher Alden, F. John Duncan, and Rob Reid. According to the organization's official website, some of these early founders served as senior appointees in the George W. Bush Administration. Lead21 executive director Daniel Trimble was the organization's first full-time employee, hired at the start of 2006, followed by a Program Manager and Press Secretary, Candace d'Holbach, in 2007.

== History ==
Lead21 was founded by a group of entrepreneurs, investors and senior executives from San Francisco and the surrounding Silicon Valley region. New Century Leadership Council (NCLC), as it was called at the time, launched the new organization at the home of Silicon Valley veteran Ellen Hancock, with former California Governor Pete Wilson as guest-of-honor. Additional early members and supporting leaders included E. Floyd Kvamme (chairman of the U.S. President's Council of Advisors on Science and Technology (PCAST), Thomas Stephenson of Sequoia Capital fame, Gregory Slayton (a notable Bush-Cheney 2004 fundraiser and currently the Ambassador to Bermuda under George W. Bush's administration), and Duf Sundheim (chairman of the California Republican Party 2003-2007). According to news and press reports from the time, more than 150 people showed up for the opening event.

NCLC was said to have started as a venue for conservatives and libertarians, whom the group claimed were politically quiet in the San Francisco Bay Area—a region widely considered to be overtly liberal. Lead21 bills itself as "multi-partisan" in its membership demographic (which reportedly includes Republicans, Independents, Libertarians, and Democrats), but mostly appears to support Republicans and Libertarians as their platform of limited government, lower taxes, and pro-business policies tend to be embraced by those political bases. Lead21 explicitly states that its focus is not about partisan politics; that it is about supporting entrepreneurship and innovation. However, the organization does not appear to have supported any Democratic candidates or campaigns except California Governor Gavin Newsom. Lead21 has hosted Mayor Newsom, and several board members of the organization as well as several of its top members have been appointed to San Francisco city commissions. It is widely noted that Newsom's election win against Matt Gonzalez in the contest for San Francisco mayor in 2003 is often attributed to direct Republican turnout in his support.

In 2003, NCLC changed its name to Lead21.

Lead21 claims it grew to several hundred members in its first few years after its founding, with no budget or staff. In 2004, Lead21 hired Sally Dorfman as a paid, part-time staffer to coordinate its increasingly routine events and bookkeeping. It was not until February 2006 that it hired its first full-time director, Daniel Trimble, who with the Board and Program Manager, Candace d'Holbach, led the organization through its most explosive growth in terms of membership and revenue. Trimble resigned in April 2007.

== Growth ==
In July 2006, director Daniel Trimble stated at a Lead21 reception with General Charles G. Boyd (former Deputy Commander-in-Chief of United States European Command (USEUCOM) that the organization has no marketing budget, and that its growth has been fueled almost entirely by word of mouth from its membership. In August 2006, Lead21 declared it was on the verge of surpassing 1,000 members and alumni, and in Fall of 2006 announced it had reached that mark. Lead21 does not make its full membership roster available to the public, however, it does list most of its "Presidential Members" and donors on its website.

== Legal status ==
Lead21 is a not-for-profit membership association filed in California, and is registered as a political organization under section 527 of U.S. tax and election laws. Lead21 is reportedly not a fundraising organization that raises money for candidates, committees or campaigns, and as such has never registered as a federal or state political action committee.

As of September 2006, Lead21 reports it is in the process of re-filing, for legal status as a combination 501(c)(3) and 501(c)(4) educational research and issue advocacy organization.

== Funding ==
Lead21 has received most of its funding from its own membership, and reportedly has become largely self-sustaining based on annual membership contributions.

According to Lead21's official website, it has received financial support from the following "major donors" among its "Chairman's Circle." It is not known publicly how much these individuals have contributed:

- William H. Draper, III (Managing Partner, Draper Richards, LP)
- Aydin Senkut (President, Felicis Ventures)
- Thomas Stephenson (Partner, Sequoia Capital)
- Tom Spengler (President & CEO, Granicus, Inc.)

== Key officials ==
From the Lead21 website, the following individuals can be identified as the key people behind the organization's operations and policies.

- Sonia Arrison, Chairman of the Board of Governors
- Auren Hoffman, Former Chairman of the Board; Lead21 Co-Founder
- Michael K. Kim, Former Chairman of the Board of Governors
- Anurag Chandra, Vice Chairman of the Board of Governors
