= Adam Sessler =

American television personality

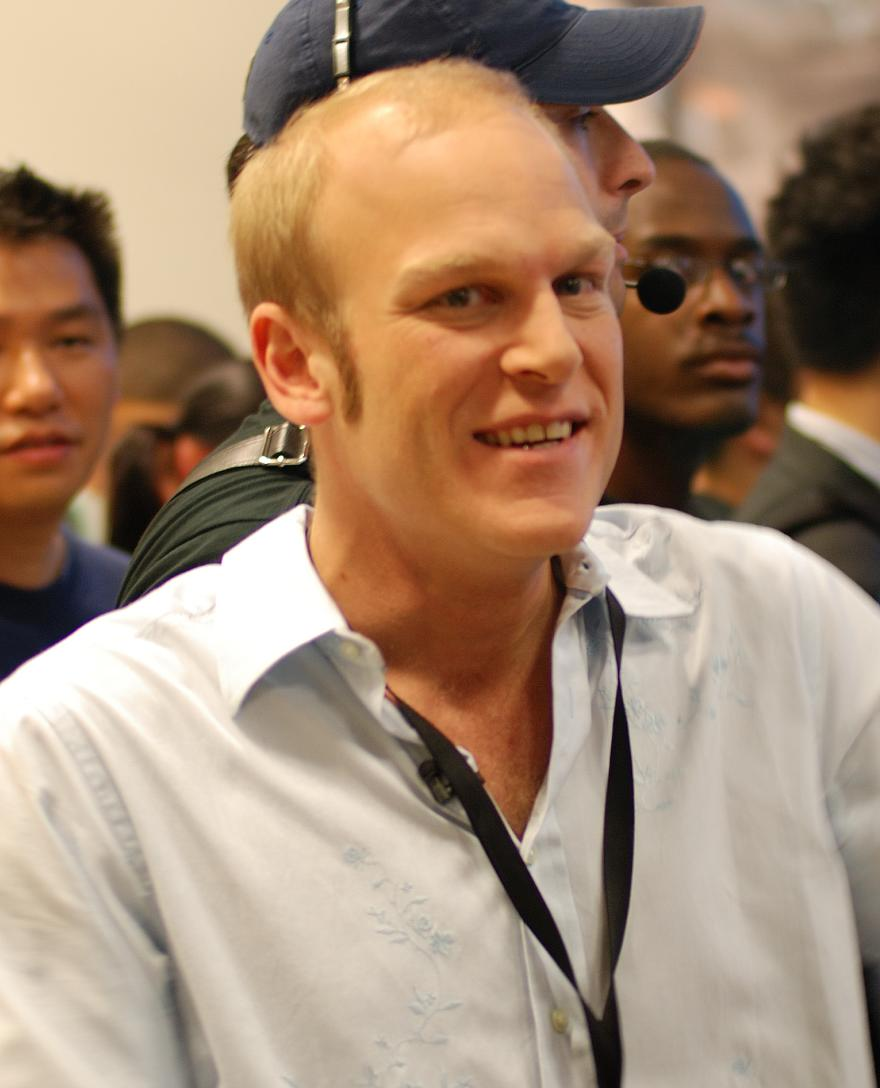
- Adam Sessler during the Halo 3 launch in New York City on September 24, 2007
- Born: August 29, 1973 (age 53); El Cerrito, California, U.S.
- Occupation: Video game journalist
- Known for: Co-host/managing editor of Xplay, former editor-in-chief and host for Rev3Games

Adam Donovan Sessler (born August 29, 1973) is an American video game journalist, television personality and consultant. He is best known as the host for the video game review series Xplay and the editor-in-chief for G4's video game section. Upon his departure from G4 in April 2012, Sessler was its longest-tenured television personality, having originally been hired by its predecessor ZDTV in 1998.

After his departure from G4, Sessler became the editor-in-chief and content producer for Rev3Games. He left video game journalism in 2014 to become the president of TheoryHead, a consultancy firm for entertainment and media. In 2021, Adam Sessler was announced as a returning On-Air Talent and staff of the relaunched G4 television network.

== Background ==
Sessler was born in El Cerrito, California, and graduated from El Cerrito High School in 1991. He graduated from UCLA with a bachelor's degree in English literature. He was previously a credit analyst for ABN-AMRO in San Francisco, and an actor on the San Francisco Public-access television show Chip Weigh Magnet Down, which he also helped to make. Sessler admitted that he was grateful to no longer work for Fortune 500 companies, saying in The X-Play Insider's Guide to Gaming that he was "very sad" about the job. Sessler currently lives in San Francisco, California, with his wife Amber.

Some of Sessler's favorite game series are the Halo series for its first-person shooter qualities; the Japanese version of Rez for its Trance Vibrator peripheral; the Banjo-Kazooie, Rayman, Ratchet & Clank, and Sly Cooper series for their unique platform qualities. In 2010, Sessler stated his top five games of the decade were, in order of release: Deus Ex, Ratchet & Clank: Up Your Arsenal, Shadow of the Colossus, Fable II, and Uncharted 2. He also stated that Uncharted 2 was his favorite single-player experience of all time.

In his 2013 review of BioShock Infinite, he stated that it is in the "rarefied company of titles like Half-Life 2 and Uncharted 2", intimating it to be a new personal favorite. Likewise, he has recently expressed affinity towards titles such as Gone Home, The Last of Us (calling it one of the finest games he's ever played), and L.A. Noire (referring to it as a "watershed moment in gaming").

Sessler's favorite cabinet video game is Ghosts 'n Goblins, which he has stated on several occasions on older episodes of Extended Play and X-Play. He stated: "When I was 9 years old I used to scam quarters from my parents and sneak out to this local bowling alley that was so seedy Hubert Selby Jr. would get the creeps there. It smelled like personal abandonment. That's what I think of when I play my favorite game".

Sessler has a younger brother, Jonathan, who appeared as Adam 2.0 in X-Play's 2005 April Fool's Day Episode, a "clone" of Adam who claims he's much better-looking than the original Adam with a "special USB port" (a reference to the Game Boy Advance SP succeeding the original Game Boy Advance).

== Career ==
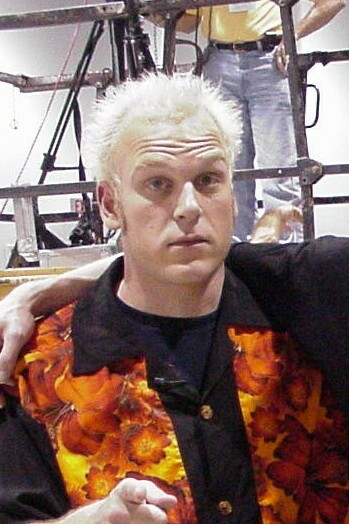
Sessler at QuakeCon 2000

Sessler was the last remaining personality from the ZDTV network, surviving the network's progression from ZDTV (1998–2000) to TechTV (2000–2004), and subsequent transition to G4. Sessler was one of seven TechTV personalities, with Morgan Webb, Sarah Lane, Kevin Rose, Chi-Lan Lieu, Blair Butler and Brendan Moran, to survive the massive layoffs resulting from the May 2004 merger of G4 and TechTV.

In addition to co-hosting X-Play, Sessler also appeared semi-regularly on Attack of the Show! as a video game correspondent.

In early 2005, Sessler started prematurely balding which led to a video tribute for his hair during an X-Play video showcase. Sessler confused many by announcing he was leaving X-Play to host a late-night talk show on G4 entitled Meet the Sess. A trailer of the new show aired on X-Play, showing Sessler verbally and physically abusing his guests until they released information about upcoming video games.

Despite being extremely over-the-top and obviously fake, many viewers began flooding the G4 forums asking when the show would air, and if Sessler was really leaving X-Play. On several occasions, Sessler has since publicly announced that the show was in fact an April Fool's Day joke. However, he had a podcast called Sessler's Soapbox as well as Feedback, where he discussed various gaming topics with other G4 correspondents and guests until late 2011, when he was replaced by Blair Herter.

On April 25, 2012, Sessler's employment contract was terminated by G4TV. No reason was given for his termination. As of October 2012, he is listed as a judge on Syfy's reality competition Viral Video Showdown.

On November 12, 2012, Sessler announced that he was joining Revision3. He remained with the network as Editor-in-Chief and Executive Producer of games content at Rev3Games until April 2014, when he announced his departure to "explore new opportunities" within "gaming that help further the medium".

On April 2, 2014, Adam Sessler announced he was leaving Revision3 and would pursue a career outside video game journalism.

On June 9, 2014, Sessler appeared as a panelist on Spike TV's coverage of E3 2014.

On June 19, 2015, he was featured as pre-show and post-show host of the Bethesda Game Studios E3 event alongside his past co-worker Morgan Webb.

In 2016, Sessler co-founded Spiketrap, an AI-based social media intelligence platform, with Kieran Fitzpatrick, who serves as its CEO. Spiketrap’s first customers have been video game publishers such as Ubisoft, Bethesda, and 2K. Sessler left the company in March 2020.

On February 12, 2021, G4 announced that Sessler would return to host Xplay on the relaunched television network, though the network ceased operations on October 16, 2022.
