= Free Stuff =

- Starring: Kevin Pereira, Morgan Webb, Lloyd the Chimp
- Country of origin: United States
- No. of seasons: 1
- No. of episodes: 23 (approx.)

Production
- Running time: 30 mins. (approx)

Original release
- Network: G4
- Release: April 6 – June 29, 2007

Free Stuff is a television program on the G4 network. "Featured products" ranging in value from $20.00 to $599.00 were previewed and then given away. Viewers entered to win the items by using their computer to submit codes which were shown to the viewers by Lloyd the Chimp during commercial breaks. The show aired throughout the month of June 2007 at 6:30 and 10:00 p.m. EDT/PDT and officially ended on June 29, 2007.

Free Stuff was hosted by Morgan Webb and Kevin Pereira.
