= Catherine Schwartz =

American television presenter (born 1977)

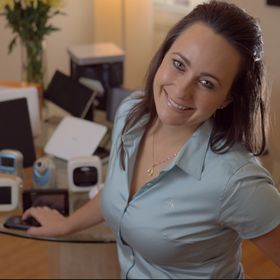
- Born: May 27, 1977 (age 49); San Francisco, California, US
- Other name: Cat Schwartz
- Occupations: Television presenter, producer
- Children: 1
- Website: www.dgtladvisors.com www.hitechmommy.com

Catherine Michelle Schwartz (born May 27, 1977) is an American television presenter. She was formerly a co-host on the TechTV television program Call for Help with Chris Pirillo and Leo Laporte.

== Early years ==
Schwartz earned degrees in communication and media studies from the University of San Diego.

== Career ==
After a stint on TechTV's The Screen Savers, Schwartz became co-host of Call for Help in 2002 with then co-host Chris Pirillo. After Pirillo left TechTV in April 2003, former host Leo Laporte returned to co-host with Schwartz. Call for Help was cancelled in May 2004 after TechTV's merger with G4, resulting in G4techTV.

In the period after the cancellation of Call for Help, Schwartz appeared as a G4techTV technology expert on the Today Show segment "Gender Wars". She also made guest appearances on short segments of The Screen Savers. She later signed on as a columnist with Stuff Magazine, with a column entitled "Ask the Tech Chick".

She also appears in the music video "Strange New Element" by the band Low Water. Near the end of the video, she makes an appearance with fellow TechTV personalities Morgan Webb, Sarah Lane, Chi-Lan Lieu and Sumi Das.

On an episode of The Screen Savers, Schwartz claimed to have invented the Swiffer during her days as a college intern. Schwartz has said that she receives no royalties and signed away her rights to the product as part of Procter & Gamble's policy. The Swiffer was actually based on the Quickle Wiper, which was launched in 1995 in Japan thanks in part to the Quickle Wiper not being patent-protected. The Japanese product was released before Schwartz was a college intern.

In the early part of 2005, Schwartz and her friend Wynter Mitchell (Screen Savers teleprompter operator) started a podcast, which stopped on May 10, 2005. It was updated with two posts – one on July 31, 2007, and the other on August 5, 2007, but has not been updated since.

In 2008, Schwartz became a gadget and toy director for eBay Insider, a blog which claims to give consumers information from experts in their field, based on searches for products found on eBay.

In 2017 Schwartz became the founder and CEO of DGTL Advisors and DGTL NTWRK. DGTL NTWRK advises companies and individuals on how to use social media to gain a digital portfolio.

== Personal life ==
In June 2003 Schwartz became the subject of a stir in the Internet community when it was discovered that at least two cropped photographs of herself she had posted on her personal blog contained hidden Exif thumbnail images clearly showing her bared breasts, because the program she used to edit them, Photoshop, did not create replacement thumbnails.

On November 25, 2005, Schwartz married South Park editor Keef Bartkus in Las Vegas, Nevada. Her married name is Catherine Michelle Bartkus but she retains the last name Schwartz in professional contexts. They divorced in 2007.

In June 2006 Schwartz gave birth to a son, Jack.
