= Rev3Games =

- Country: United States
- Network: YouTube

Programming
- Language: English
- Picture format: 1080p (HDTV)

Ownership
- Owner: Discovery Digital Networks

History
- Launched: March 13, 2012; 14 years ago
- Closed: November 6, 2014; 11 years ago

Links
- Website: revision3.com/games

Availability

Streaming media
- YouTube channel: Rev3Games

Rev3Games was a streaming television channel owned by Revision3, a subsidiary of Discovery Digital Networks, with shows about video games. The channel launched on March 13, 2012. On November 12, 2012, Revision3 announced that it had hired Adam Sessler, a previous staff member of TechTV who had continued through to G4 to host the television series X-Play. Sessler was the editor-in-chief and executive producer of Rev3Games, until leaving Discovery Digital Networks in April 2014. The channel includes reviews and previews of upcoming games, interviews, and general discussion of video games. The channel's final hosts were Tara Long and Nick Robinson. Past hosts were Max Scoville, Scott Bromley, and Anthony Carboni. Discovery Digital Networks ended the operations of Rev3Games on November 6, 2014, for reasons that have not been disclosed.

== Programming ==
=== Address the Sess ===
Sessler engages in conversation with fans live on Google+ Hangouts.

=== Casual Friday ===
Rev3Games staff discuss a gaming related topic.

=== Coffee Talk ===
Nick Robinson talks with people from the office about gaming related topics.

=== Max Scoville's Study Hall ===
Max Scoville recommends products within different forms of pop culture, in relation to an upcoming game.

=== Rev3Games Originals ===
Sessler interviews video game developers.

=== Rev3Games Previews ===
Rev3Games' hosts give their impressions on upcoming games.

=== Rev3Games Reviews ===
Rev3Games' host give their opinions on recently released games and give a score on a scale of 1 to 5. Sessler structured the reviews similarly to X-play's reviews because that is what he was familiar with and he dislikes the 10 point scale.

=== Sessler's ...Something ===
Sessler shares his thoughts on games and the gaming industry.

=== Spoiled Games ===
Sessler and 2 guests discuss everything about a specific game.

== Game of the Year ==
- 2012: Journey
- 2013: BioShock Infinite & The Last of Us
