= Sonia Arrison =

American author

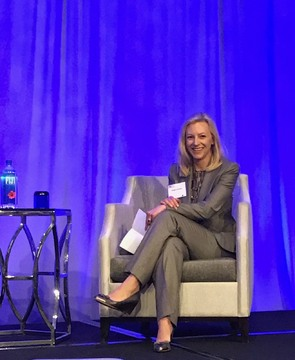
Sonia Arrison seated onstage

Sonia Arrison (born September 8, 1972) is an American author of books and articles relating to the impact of technology on human life, including national bestseller 100 Plus: How the Coming Age of Longevity Will Change Everything, From Careers and Relationships to Family and Faith, a book on research into life extension.

== Early life and career ==
Born in Alberta, Canada to a pharmacist mother and a chemical engineer father, Arrison studied political science at the University of Calgary in the mid-1990s. She became interested in the political impact of the internet, which eventually led to her becoming director of technology studies at the Pacific Research Institute, a libertarian think tank headquartered in San Francisco, in the early 2000s.

== Activism ==
In 2000, Arrison published a column in the San Francisco Chronicle opposing San Francisco's adoption of an "open access" policy for cable operators. She also criticized San Francisco's 2006 decision to provide free wireless telecommunications access throughout the city, writing that "[a] city administration that cannot fix our streets, run an effective public transport system, address the tragedy of the homeless and reduce taxes has no business monopolizing the Internet." In 2007, Arrison described the transparency in pledge and donation amounts to be an important open-source element of moneybomb success, stating that "[t]hose revelations stand in direct contrast to traditional campaigns, which tend to be silent and proprietary about who is donating." Arrison was also Chairman of the Board of Governors of Lead21, through which she met her husband, Aydin Senkut, who was "one of Google's first employees".

== Longevity research and 100 Plus ==
Arrison was an Associate Founder of Singularity University. In a 2010 New York Times interview, she described her motivation for writing 100 Plus, which was then a work in progress, and which was described along with Singularity University as "her attempts to ready people for the inevitable". "One day we will wake up and say, 'Wow, we can regenerate a new liver'", Ms. Arrison says. "It will happen so fast, and the role of Singularity University is to prepare people in advance". 100 Plus "outlines changes that people can expect as life expectancies increase, like 20-year marriages with sunset clauses".

100 Plus was published in 2011, with a foreword by Peter Thiel, a longtime friend whom Arrison had introduced to leading life extension researchers. Arrison was a speaker at the October 2011 Singularity Summit in New York, and appeared as a guest on Stossel on December 22, 2011. In a 2012 CBS News interview, Arrison stated that she was inspired to write 100 Plus after viewing an episode of the U.S. reality TV series, The Swan, in which participants were overjoyed to receive a makeover involving relatively minor plastic surgery procedures. Arrison stated that this got her to thinking about the possible societal changes accompanying the much more substantial changes becoming possible through new medical advances.

Another interview noted that while critics worry that increased longevity will spur overpopulation, "Aubrey de Grey and Sonia Arrison, two leading advocates of life extension and advisers to the Palo Alto Prize, brush these concerns aside". The piece continues, "Arrison notes that the rate of global population expansion is slowing", but "claims that increasing the healthy life span, by extending the sweet spot of adulthood that combines vigor with the wisdom of experience, will give the world's best minds more time to innovate solutions to humanity's problems".

== Publications ==
- With Thomas Hazlett, Telecrisis: How Regulation Stifles High-Speed Internet Access, San Francisco, Calif: Pacific Research Institute for Public Policy, 2003. ISBN 978-0936488899. OCLC 52769516
- 100 Plus: How the Coming Age of Longevity Will Change Everything, From Careers and Relationships to Family and Faith (Basic Books, 2011), ISBN 978-0465063765
- "Will You Still Love Me When I’m 164?", Time (September 18, 2013).
