= Dubset =

Audio distribution website

- Website type: Distribution Platform, Internet Radio
- Owners: Dubset Media Holdings, LLC.
- Website: www.dubset.com
- Commercial: Yes
- Launched: 4 April 2012; 14 years ago

Dubset (formerly known as The Future FM) is an online mixed-audio distribution platform that allows DJs to upload, host and share their mixes, podcasts, etc. It assures DJs that the underlying rights holders sampled within the mix will be paid royalties for their works. Dubset is the distribution arm of Dubset Media Holdings, which is based in New York City.

Dubset has licensing deals with Sony Music, Warner Music Group, Sony/ATV Music Publishing, the National Music Publishers' Association and the Merlin Network for the monetization of remixes. These remixes can be delivered to Apple Music, Spotify, and Tidal. The company is still in talks with Universal Music Group for the inclusion of their catalogue.

In March 2020, Dubset was acquired by Pex.

== History ==
The Future FM was formerly known as Dubset.com before being rebranded in May 2012. It began with the founder, Dave Stein, growing frustrated that he couldn't legally publish or share live DJ sets online which he was experiencing at parties. Therefore, Dubset.com created a proprietary technology, MixSCAN, that allows tracks being sampled within a mix to be properly fingerprinted and reported for rights flow purposes. This allowed the site to position itself as one of the first compliant services for streaming DJ mixed content. The technology itself piqued the interest of many, which in turn opened new business lines and opportunities for Dubset. The platform received an initial $500,000 in seed funding from Governing Dynamics VC and various other angels. After a year of operating as Dubset.com, there was a shift towards rebranding in order to advance the features of the platform, as well as to help clear up the confusion surrounding the phonetic similarities between both the name of the site and the popular dance genre dubstep.

The Future FM created an Indiegogo campaign in the beginning of 2013 in order to take the next step in the development of their MixSCAN technology. Since then, The Future FM has revamped their brand design, site and overall features. Some of these features include, embeddable and social media players, in which notable artists have begun using such as, David Guetta, Tiësto and Afrojack.

== Technology ==
The proprietary technology, MixSCAN, serves as the backbone of the platform by allowing DJs to upload and stream their mix content compliantly. MixSCAN is Dubset Media's music identification and rights resolution technology. All mix content is run through MixSCAN, which consists of a three-step process of audio fingerprinting, textual fingerprinting and final oversight by Dubset production engineers. Once the mix content has completed the process, a unique MixDNA is then assigned to the mix which consists of metadata surrounding the sampled tracks.

== Features ==
The Future FM offers DJs unlimited mix uploads to their custom channels. Select DJs and mixes are published on the homepage to be prominently featured to listeners. Mixes can also be distributed virtually anywhere via either an embeddable widget and/or Facebook player. Video pre-roll advertisements are served in front of mix content in order to ensure that the underlying rights holders are paid (on behalf of the DJ) for their sampled work.

The platform and technology serve as a medium to connect DJs with brands, such as Lindsay Luv and Victoria's Secret, Smirnoff's Master of the Mix show on VH1, etc. Brands are able to create custom skinned channels to host and share original mixes directly associated with their brand.

DJs are able to review their royalty earnings by enrolling into The Future FM 'Royalty Program'.

Listeners and fans of DJ mixed music can access mixes on the go with The Future FM iPhone app.
