= Robert Reid (author) =

American businessperson and author

Rob Reid
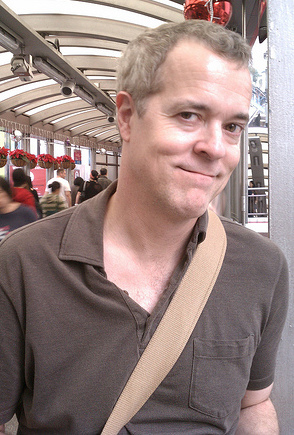
- Rob Reid
- Born: Robert H. Reid; October 2, 1965 (age 61); New York City
- Education: Stanford University; Harvard Business School
- Known for: Entrepreneur, author
- Spouse: Morgan Webb
- Website: www.readrobreid.com

Robert H. Reid (born October 2, 1965) is an American author and entrepreneur. He is the author of two novels, the science fiction Year Zero: A Novel, and the cyberthriller After On: A Novel of Silicon Valley, as well as a nonfiction book, Architects of the Web, about the rise of the internet business. Reid is the founder of Listen.com Inc., which created the Rhapsody digital music service.

== Early life ==
Robert Reid was born in New York City, and grew up in Darien, Connecticut. As an undergraduate at Stanford University he studied Arabic and International Relations. He also has an MBA from Harvard. In 1994, Reid moved to Silicon Valley to work for Silicon Graphics, where he managed the company's relations with Netscape.

== Career ==
=== Writing ===
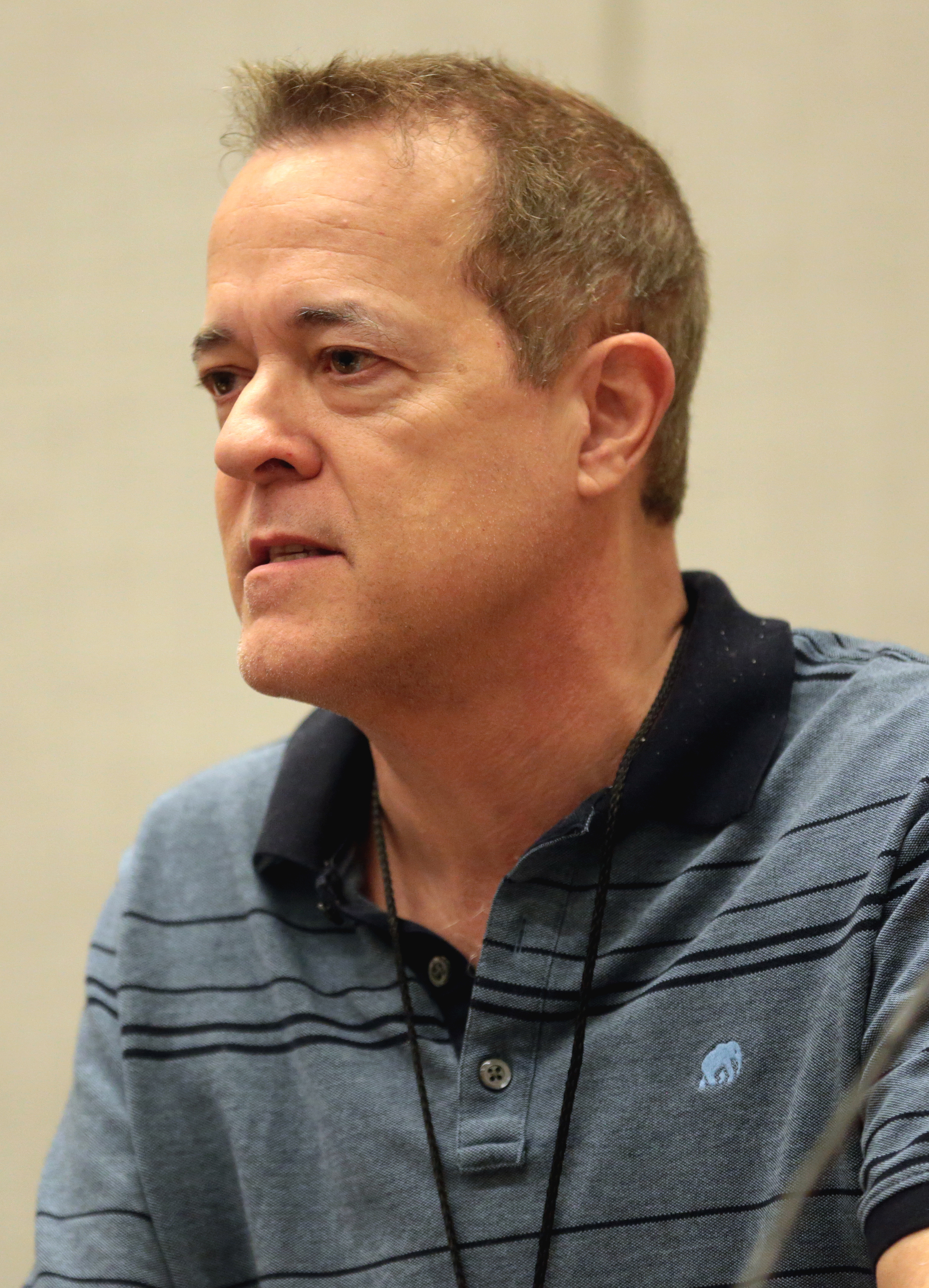
Reid at Phoenix Comicon in 2017

After Silicon Graphics, Reid became a venture capitalist. He continued to write as well, for places such as Wired, including a 1997 cover story about online video.

In 1995, Reid wrote Year One, which was an examination of student life, as a student at Harvard Business School. The paperback was released by Avon the following year, in the wake of positive reviews from Business Week and others.

Reid wrote Architects of the Web, a book about the Silicon Valley, in 1997. It chronicled the rise of the Internet as a commercial medium as well as then-rising entrepreneurs like Marc Andreessen of Netscape, Jerry Yang of Yahoo and Rob Glaser of RealNetworks. It was positively reviewed and later released in paperback in 1999.

In July 2012, Random House/Del Rey published Year Zero, a work of science fiction. The plot revolves around alien cultures coming into contact with Earth music. The resulting fines and penalties from copyright infringement have bankrupted the whole universe. Humans suddenly own everything—and the aliens are not amused.

In August 2017, Random House/Del Rey published After On: A Novel of Silicon Valley, a cyberthriller also rooted in science fiction. The plot involves the rise of a superintelligent AI and involves elements concerning data privacy and government intrusion, post-Tinder romance, nihilistic terrorism, artificial consciousness, and synthetic biology.

=== Business and lecturing ===
Reid was the sole founder of the online music company Listen.com, where he served as CEO and as Executive chairman. In 2001, Listen.com launched Rhapsody, an unlimited music streaming service for $9.99 a month—the first licensed service of its kind. In 2003, the company was acquired by RealNetworks, where Reid remained as a company vice president. Later, MTV purchased Rhapsody from RealNetworks for $230 million.

In March 1999, Reid became the founding outside board member of IGN Entertainment. IGN went public in March of the following year and was acquired by News Corp in September 2005 for $650 million.

== Personal life ==
Reid is married to former G4 personality and technology journalist Morgan Webb. The two collaborated on the online show Webbalert – a daily video podcast covering developments in the tech world. WebbAlert ran until 2009.
