= Justin Robert Young =

American podcaster (born 1983)

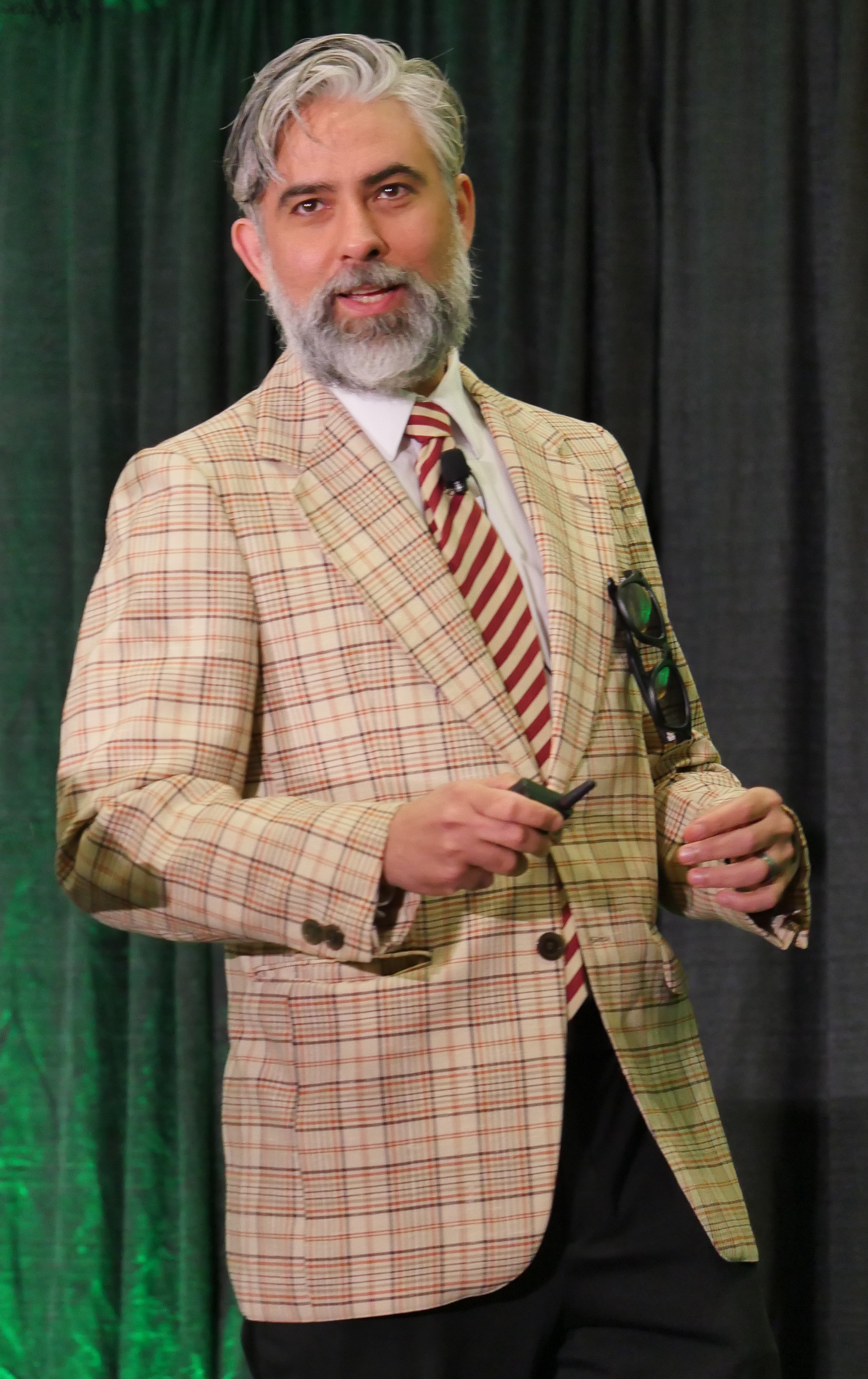
- Young at CSICon 2026
- Born: March 5, 1983 (age 43); Fort Worth, Texas
- Education: Syracuse University
- Occupations: Journalist and podcaster
- Notable work: Politics! Politics! Politics! Podcast; Daily Tech News Show; Great Night; Night Attack; WeirdThings.com; G4 Underground
- Website: www.politicspoliticspolitics.com

Justin Robert Young (born March 5, 1983) is a podcaster, journalist, comedian and writer. Young writes and publishes the Politics, Politics, Politics! podcast, and co-hosts the weekly comedy podcast Great Night with magician Brian Brushwood.

Young has recorded four comedy albums with Brushwood, two of which (Night Attack 2: Enjoy the Garden and Night Attack: Live) debuted at #1 on Billboard's Comedy Albums chart.

== Biography ==
Young was born in Fort Worth, Texas but considers Davie, Florida his hometown. He graduated from South Plantation High School in 2001.

Young is a graduate of the Syracuse University journalism program where he also worked at The Daily Orange, the independent student newspaper of Syracuse, New York, as its editor-in-chief. He has also worked as a newspaper journalist for The South Florida Sun-Sentinel and The Morning Call. Young decided to include his middle name in his professional moniker, as several persons were already utilizing the name "Justin Young" in a professional capacity.

== Journalism and podcasting career ==
Following his brief tenure in newspaper journalism, Young was recruited by longtime friend and magic inventor Andrew Mayne to serve as the editor-in-chief of iTricks.com, published by Mayne. Young later went on to serve as editor of WeirdThings.com, also published by Mayne. In 2009 Young began the Weird Things podcast with co-hosts Mayne and Brushwood, and served as an Associate Producer on the first season of G4 Underground.

Young has also worked as a correspondent for BitTorrent News as it launched at the Republican National Convention, as well as covering other political news, until BitTorrent News eventually shut down.

== Comedy career ==
During and after college, Young performed stand-up comedy and improv in addition to attempting a comedy podcast.

Young hosted a short-lived YouTube series called TalkingHead TV in which he interviewed guests from around the world on the topics of tech and pop culture, including an early interview with magician and future podcast collaborator Brian Brushwood. Young met Brushwood in Florida while interviewing him for iTricks.com. Soon after, Young became a regular guest on Brushwood's BBLiveShow podcast. Young and Brushwood were selected by Leo Laporte's TWiT network to co-host a late-night comedy show, NSFW. NSFW premiered on November 24, 2009.

As co-host of NSFW and later Night Attack, Young has interviewed many notable people such as The Walking Dead star Michael Rooker and novelist/screenwriter C. Robert Cargill, as well as musical guests such as Get Set Go, Turquoise Jeep, and Ali Spagnola. Young has also co-hosted a podcast film festival with film director and producer Christopher Coppola, and has written advertisements for Greg Grunberg's website Talk About It, which promotes epilepsy awareness.

Young and Brushwood released a comedy album Night Attack in 2011, debuting at #38 on Billboard's Launchpad. The duo have since released three sequel albums, two of which (Night Attack 2: Enjoy the Garden and Night Attack: Live) debuted at #1 on Billboard's Comedy Albums chart. They were also responsible for the crowd-sourced parody of Fifty Shades of Grey titled The Diamond Club: A Novel.

== Other works ==
Young is a co-creator of The Contender, a card game on the theme of presidential debate. The project was kickstarted with $142,551 in crowd-sourced funding.

== Internet broadcasting and television ==
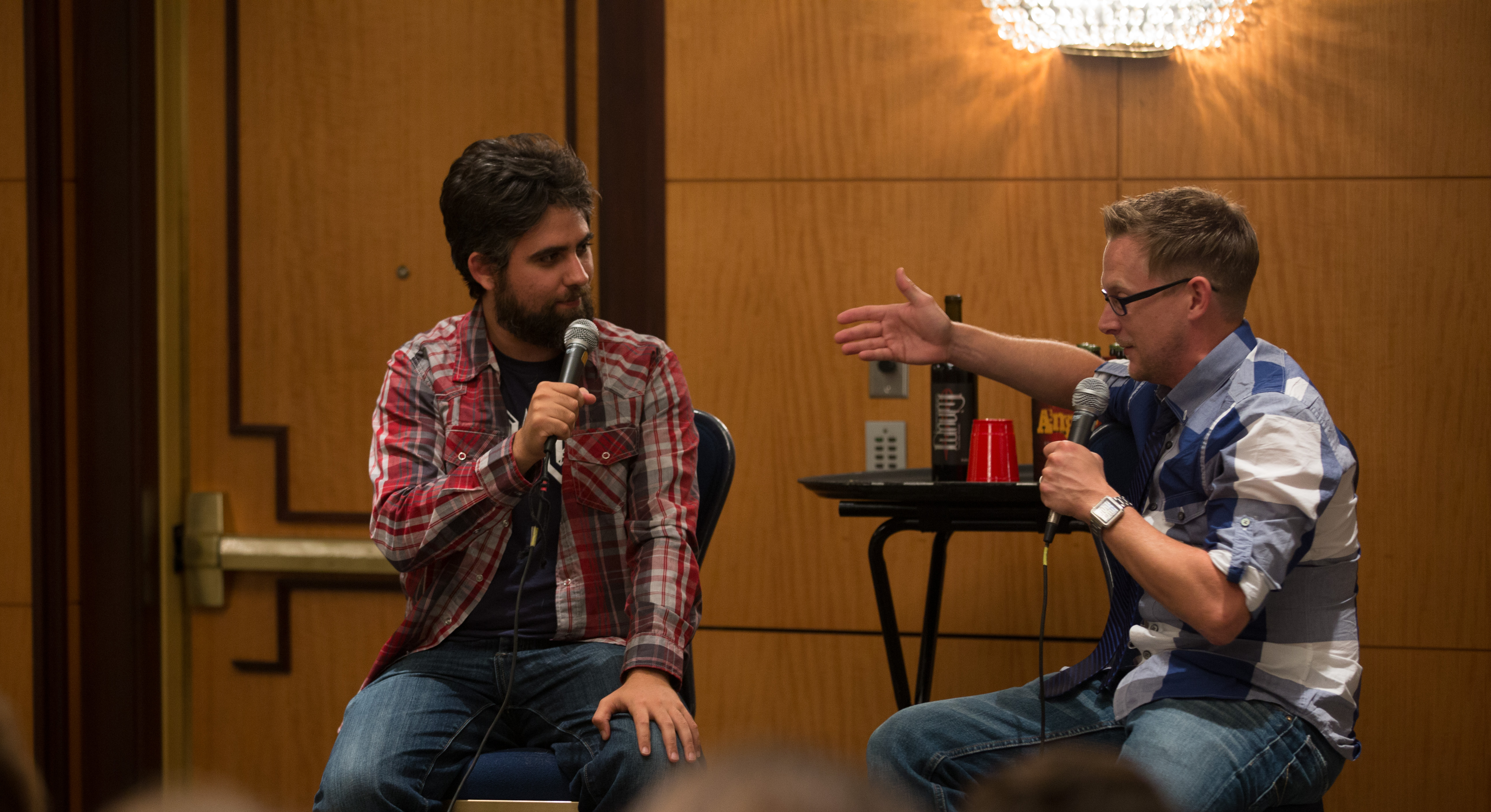
Justin Robert Young and Brian Brushwood hosting a show at Dragon*Con 2013

=== Current ===
- After Things – A podcast discussing various aspects of being a creative professional.
- Daily Tech News Show – Young is a weekly correspondent of the technology news podcast hosted by Tom Merritt.
- Great Night – A weekly program that is a re-tooling of the former Night Attack show.
- Politics Politics Politics! – Non-partisan political commentary.
- Weird Things Podcast – A podcast discussing science, the paranormal, the supernatural, and fringe, hosted by Young, Brushwood, and Andrew Mayne.
- We're Not Wrong – A discussion of politics, government, and media hosted by Young, Jennifer Briney, and Andrew Heaton.

=== Former ===
- BBLiveShow – Young became a regular guest on the show after several call-ins to the show following a chance meet-up with host Brian Brushwood in Florida for an interview for iTricks.
- Before You Buy – Occasional contributor of technology reviews on the TWiT network.
- Game On! – Young was the lead writer of TWiT's short-lived gaming news podcast.
- Hotline Monday – A live call-in drive time podcast where viewers can call-in to the show and discuss anything in the news, however it is heavily focused on geeky content. Young is the co-host with Johnson.
- iTricks Magic Week in Review – A review of the latest magic news of the week, as well as interviews with personalities in the magic industry.
- JuRY – A solo weekly podcast with an eclectic blend of humorous anecdotes, cultural musing and audience feedback.
- Night Attack – A weekly comedy podcast which Young co-hosts with Brian Brushwood. It was named after the Billboard #1 Comedy Album series and succeeded the NSFW Show.
- NSFW Show – Following the success of BBLiveShow, Young and Brushwood started a weekly comedy show for the technology-minded on the TWiT Network.
- Raise The Dead – In-depth looks at the presidential election campaigns from the 1960s with comparisons to modern campaigns.
- This Week in Tech – Young was an occasional contributor to Leo Laporte's roundtable technology discussion show.
- Unfriend Me – A topical podcast where Young and Scott Johnson discuss controversial topics with call-in guests.
