= Andrew Mayne =

Novelist, inventor, magician, original prompt engineer and science communicator

Andrew Mayne is a novelist, inventor, magician, original prompt engineer and science communicator for OpenAI and contributor to GPT-4 for novel capability discovery. He is a three-time Thriller Award finalist and an Edgar finalist for his novel Black Fall. In 2019, he swam alongside great white sharks using an underwater stealth suit in the Discovery Channel Shark Week special Andrew Mayne: Ghost Diver. Having written and produced over fifty books, DVDs, and manuscripts on magic, he was described in 2010 as one of the most prolific magic creators of the 2000s. He is also the publisher of iTricks.com and the host of the Weird Things podcast. In 2021, Mayne became the Science Communicator for OpenAI.

== Fiction Author ==
Andrew Mayne has published over twenty novels.

- The Grendel's Shadow (2011)
- Public Enemy Zero (2011)
- Hollywood Pharaohs (2012)
- Knight School (2013)
- Game Knight (2015)
- How to write a Novella in 24 Hours (2015)

=== The Chronological Man series ===
- The Monster in the Mist (2011)
- The Martian Emperor (2012)

=== Station Breaker series ===
- Station Breaker (2017)
- Orbital (2018)

=== Jessica Blackwood series ===
- Angel Killer (2014)
- Fire in the Sky (2015)
- Name of the Devil (2016)
- Black Fall (2017)

=== Theo Cray series ===
- The Naturalist (2017)
- Looking Glass (2018)
- Murder Theory (2019)
- Dark Pattern (2019)

=== Theo Cray and Jessica Blackwood series ===
- Mastermind (2021)
- The Final Equinox (2022)

=== Underwater Investigation Unit series ===
- The Girl Beneath the Sea (2020)
- Black Coral (2021)
- Sea Storm (2022)
- Sea Castle (2023)
- Dark Dive (2024)

=== Trasker series ===
- Night Owl (2023)
- Death Stake (2024)

=== Specialists series ===
- Mr. Whisper (2025)

== Performer ==
Andrew Mayne started his professional performing career as a teenager working a summer in a circus. By the time he was nineteen he was performing in resorts and cruise ships including Norwegian Cruise Line, Majesty Cruise Lines, and Carnival Cruise Lines. At the time he was the youngest magician performing internationally with an illusion show.

== Podcasting ==
- "Weird Things - The Podcast" Co-hosted with Brian Brushwood and Justin Robert Young
- "The Grendel's Shadow" Writer
- "The Amazing Show starring James Randi Executive-producer
- "The Official Criss Angel Podcast" Executive-producer
- "Current Geek 06: Flapping the Bird" with Scott Johnson, Justin Robert Young, and Tom Merritt Guest Co-Host

== Magic books ==
Andrew has published over 50 magic books and videos for the magic fraternity.

- Solo-X (1996)
- Illusion FX (1997)
- Shock Magic (1998)
- Mad Mojo (1999)
- illusionbook (2001)
- illusiontech (2007)

Mayne's first books Solo-X and Illusion FX featured novel stage illusions. Solo-X included Mayne's method for walking through a mirror which has since seen numerous variations by other performers on stage and television. Illusion FX featured Mayne's reworking of the Indian Sword Basket illusion using balloon swords.

After publishing several works on illusions, Mayne began releasing several "shock magic" effects to the magic fraternity. Some of Mayne's "shock magic" style effects include the production of a bowling ball from a paper bag (Freefall), an impromptu pencil through face penetration and a psychic prediction using a cockroach.

== Videos ==
- "Shock FX"
- "Wizard School"
- "Illusion EFX"
- "Freefall"
- "Tear Down"
- "Ghost Vision"

== Television ==
- "MSNBC"
- "Dateline NBC"
- "Wizard School" Public Television
- "G4 Underground" for the G4 TV Executive-producer and co-creator
- Don't Trust Andrew Mayne premiered on A&E on January 13, 2014.
- "Andrew Mayne: Ghost Diver" Discovery Channel Shark Week August 8, 2019

== Other work ==
In addition to writing, he has directed two independent features, several instructional videos and the underground magic video Shock FX. Mayne has lectured in classrooms on Teaching Critical Thinking and skepticism toward paranormal claims.

For five years he was the principal investigator for James Randi's One Million Dollar Paranormal Challenge. Andrew Mayne also invented a very paranormal effect called ghost vision in which the image of a ghost's shadow appears on a picture or video of a borrowed cell phone. He also has a TV show dubbed Do not trust Andrew Mayne

He's the publisher of iTricks.com, a daily magic news site that focuses on the entertainment side of magic. iTricks came second in The Magic Woods Awards 2007, for best website. Through iTricks Andrew produces five magic themed podcasts covering magic and magic celebrity news.

In June 2026, ABC announced the development of a TV adaptation of The Naturalist book series.
