= CNET Video =

CNET's online video provider

- Type: Online media content provider
- Industry: Mass media
- Founded: 2005
- Headquarters: San Francisco, California, U.S.
- Products: Video podcasts
- Website: www.cnet.com/videos/

CNET Video is a San Francisco and New York-based network showing original programming catering to the niche market of technology enthusiasts, operated by Ziff Davis through their CNET brand. CNET Video originated as the television program production arm of CNET Networks in the United States, producing programs starting in the mid-to-late 1990s. It was CNET Networks' first project. Technology-themed television shows produced by CNET Video also aired on G4 in Canada. CNET Video is a 2012 Technology People's Voice Webby Award Winner. On July 24, 2013, CNET Video launched a new CNET Video+ app for iOS, Android and Xbox SmartGlass.

== Shows ==
Current programming of CNET Video consists of short-form video shot in-studio or in front of a greenscreen and long-form video productions made of packaged clips or new content. All current productions are distributed as podcasts and most programming is available for download at CNET, on the iTunes Store and on the CNET Video app for platforms such as Roku. A 24-hour CNET channel can be found on Pluto TV channel 684 (this channel was added to the service well before the two became sister properties by the re-merger of Viacom and CBS in late 2019).

- Adventures in Tech, hosted by Luke Westaway, is a show talking about technology products that revolutionized today's world, and why some did well, and why others did not.
- The Apple Core airs weekly, hosted by Vanessa Hand Orellana, covering latest news, rumors, and reviews of "everything inside the world of Apple". The show is the sister show to Alphabet City.
- Car Tech showcases standalone automobile reviews, and is either hosted by either Brian Cooley, Antuan Goodwin, or Wayne Cunningham. Past productions involving car reviews include the audio Car Tech Podcast from 2007 and Car Tech Live from 2009 and also hosted by Goodwin and Cunningham.
- CNET On Cars, hosted by Brian Cooley since September 2012, reviews the latest automobiles with an emphasis on technology offered on each vehicle. It usually features 4 segments. These segments can be: a review of a car, Smarter Driver, Car Tech 101, Top 5, Car Of The Future or a segment from XCAR, usually by Alex Goy.
- CNET Top 5 counts down current trends in consumer electronics, tracking popularity, usage, or demand of certain. gadgets. Hosted by Tom Meritt from 2004 to 2010 and by Brian Cooley from 2010 to 2012, Donald Bell from 2012 to 2015, the show will be Hosted by CNET Editor Iyaz Ahktar in 2015 after Donald Bell Leaves CNET.
- Cracking Open, hosted by Bill Detwiler has him taking apart gadgets and checking out their inner workings.
- Crave airs Fridays featuring CNET personality Steven Beacham providing a look at what is on Crave, The Gadget Blog
- First Look features initial hands-on demos of gadgets by CNET editors. Past video reviews were featured on various podcasts under CNET's Crave brand.
- Alphabet City airs weekly, hosted by Iyaz Ahztar, covering latest news, rumors, and reviews of "everything Google that we can pack inside of a show each week". The show is the sister show to The Apple Byte.
- How To, hosted by Sharon Profis, Donald Bell, Dan Graziano, and other CNET editors, offers short do-it-yourself video instructions to common computer user tasks and gadget operation. Apple and Google related how-to's are also shown in segments in The Apple Byte and Googlicious. Originally hosted by Tom Merritt, it also aired under the titles Hacks and Insider Secrets. CNET also uploads independently produced instructional videos on YouTube also branded as How To.
- Next Big Thing, hosted by Brian Cooley, is the show on CNET dedicated to all things future technology. It premiered on September 12, 2013.
- News, hosted by CNET editors usually Sumi Das and Kara Tsuboi, bringing important news stories with commentary.
- Prizefight compares two of the latest gadgets as judged by a panel of CNET editors, hosted by Brian Tong, formerly by Veronica Belmont.
- The 404, hosted by Jeff Bakalar and Russ Frushtick and featuring Iyaz Akhtar, Ariel Nunez, Richard Peterson, and Bridget Carey, is an audio or video podcast talk show covering daily tech news and pop culture under the slogan, High Tech, Low Brow. It broadcasts from CNET's New York City CBS studios weekly. It used to broadcast a daily live show but that ended after a studio change. The 404 is the only remnant of the previous CNET Live format (from which all other shows were canceled) and spawned a short-lived video game discussion show preGAME, also hosted by Bakalar. Frequent guests include CBS MoneyWatch editor Jill Schlesinger and other CNET editors though the show has welcomed prolific podcasters like Marc Maron and Scott Aukerman and other celebrities in recent years as its popularity has grown. The show has amassed a large following without the use of standard advertising or promotion as it does not necessarily fall within the typical format of a CNET property. In production since November 2007, it was previously co-hosted by Randall Bennett until May 2008, Wilson Tang until February 2012, and Justin Yu until July 2014. At the start of May 2013, Bakalar and Yu began implying that a move to a bigger studio might be in the works. In December 2013, the show actually moved into a brand new studio. The crew has also been hinting that a brand new weekly show, hosted by Bakalar (with Yu and others producing) would hit in 2014 and is currently said to be in pre-production. On June 6, 2014, The 404 Show broadcast its 1,500th episode. In July, 2014, Justin Yu left the show and was replaced by Iyaz Akhtar, a long time podcaster and host from the TWiT.tv network. On December 4, 2014, the show broadcast its 1,589th episode, thus surpassing Buzz Out Loud as CNET's longest-running podcast ever. It was also announced that starting in 2015 the show would return to its roots as an audio-only podcast. Starting in 2016, the show is now hosted solely by Bakalar and Frushtick after Akhtar was asked to leave the show.
- The Fix is a how-to show featuring multiple how-to's all about a single show topic. The show is hosted by Donald Bell, Sharon Profis and Eric Franklin.
- XCAR, hosted by Alex Goy, is the sometimes considered a sister show to CNET ON Cars, while CNET On Cars takes a technology angle to cars, this is all about high-performance, classic and unique cars. The angle that CNET editor-in-chief Lindsey Turrentine gave it was "...we're getting the chance to put some of the world's most beautiful technology -- the automobile -- on a pedestal, showcasing it with stunning and creative camerawork and clever delivery."

== Past shows and podcasts ==
Until Summer 2012, CNET Video streamed live programming on its subsite CNET Live, consisting of audio talk shows with video feeds, which also were distributed as podcasts. On March 23, 2012, CNET TV's flagship talk show Buzz Out Loud announced that it and most of CNET Live will be cancelled for more on-demand content (save for The 404 Show, which is still running).

=== CNET Live audio/video talk shows ===
- Always On premiered after the discontinuation of Buzz Out Loud, featuring CNET personality Molly Wood, and co-host/partner Jeff Cannata in seasons 3 and 4. The show usually had 4-5 segments placed together in one episode. These segments usually were: Unboxings, Road Tests, Future Tech, Torture Tests, Mini-Molly Rants and How-To. The program aired weekly and also in segments. The viewer mail segment at the end of the show originated from the former program CNET Mailbag also hosted by Wood.
- Android Atlas Weekly aired weekly on Wednesdays, CNET editors Justin Eckhouse and Antuan Goodwin examined Android phones and devices.
- Buzz Out Loud was a daily technology news talk show podcast from March 2005 to January 2009 and was produced weekly until its end in April 2012. BOL was hosted by Molly Wood, Brian Tong, and Stephen Beacham at its end and was also known for being co-hosted by Tom Merritt and Veronica Belmont. It spawned CNET TV's short-form video segment The Buzz Report which was hosted by Wood from May 2006 to April 2012.
- Car Tech Live aired weekly on Thursdays August 2009 to April 2012. Brian Cooley, Antuan Goodwin, and Wayne Cunningham examined the latest technology in cars.
- CNET Conversations, formerly hosted by Brian Cooley, showcased interviews with tech luminaries concerning things happening in the world of technology.
- Crave aired Tuesdays as a weekly podcast hosted by Eric Franklin and Donald Bell, discussing the latest gadgets posted on the eponymous blog
- CNET Labcast hosted by Dan Ackerman, Scott Stein, Julie Rivera, and Joseph Kaminski aired from September 2011 to March 2012 discussing product reviews on all consumer electronics. Labcast originated as Digital City which began October 2008.
- Device and Conquer aired periodically and was hosted by Brian Cooley, helping consumers understand current tech paradigms and trends.
- Inside Scoop, hosted by Sumi Das and Kara Tsuboi, feature behind the scenes interviews about the latest tech developments.
- CNET To the Rescue/The Real Deal, hosted by Rafe Needleman and Josh Lowensohn (formerly co-hosted with Tom Merritt) was produced on-demand and sometimes live weekdays, tackling consumer questions on tech
- Dialed In discussed cell phone reviews, airing Wednesdays from August 2009 to April 2012 hosted by Kent German, Jessica Dolcourt, Lynn La, and Brian Bennett.
- preGAME aired Tuesdays, discussing video game releases
- Digital City aired weekdays; CNET editors discussed product reviews, In September 2011 it was replaced by CNET Labcast
- Gadgettes discussed tech topics related to women, hosted by Molly Wood, Kelly Morrison, and Jason Howell.
- Googlicious aired weekly, hosted by Brian Tong, covering latest news, rumors, and reviews of "everything Google that we can pack inside of a show each week". The show was the sister show to Apple Byte.
- Hooked Up was the only show on CNET that blended tech, with celebrities. It premiered April 24, 2013 on CNET and was hosted by Kevin Frazier and Brian Tong.
- MP3 Insider, hosted by Jasmine France and Donald Bell (formerly Veronica Belmont and James Kim), aired until May 2010.
- Security Bites- hosted by Robert Vamosi, discontinued November 2008
- Rumor Has It rounded up the week's biggest rumors. It was originally hosted by Emily Dreyfuss and Karyne Levy. After that the show is hosted only by Levy. It originated as an audio talk show and later became a video production.
- Tap That App covered "the hottest apps in the mobile space" as told by various CNET editors. Tap That App aired monthly.
- Apple Byte aired weekly, hosted by Brian Tong, covering latest news, rumors, and reviews of "everything inside the world of Apple". The show was the sister show to Googlicious. It was replaced by The Apple Core after Tong left CNET.

=== CNET Video video-only shows ===
- The Buzz Report, Molly Wood's weekly wrap-up on tech news
- CNET Tech Review, packaged short-form video segments into one half-hour program
- Crossfade TV- biweekly program hosted by Kurt Wolff, Mike Tao, Peter Gavin, Anngie Dehoyos on Download.com and MP3.com
- Planet CNET- news program hosted by Kara Tsuboi, Louise Ghegan, Rory Reid, Ella Morton, and John Chan
- Loaded - daily tech update hosted by Bridget Carey; replaced by CNET Update in March 2012.
- CNET Update airs weekdays offering current daily tech news hosted by Bridget Carey. Daily news will now be reported by several other CNET team members with Carey working on a bigger reporting project.

=== Audio-only podcasts ===
- The Digital Home- hosted by Don Reisinger
- Studio C was a weekly program hosted by Kurt Wolff, Ariel Nuñez, Mike Tao, and Peter Gavin on Download.com and MP3.com

== Awards ==
Year	Nominee / work	Award	Result
2012	"'CNET Video"'	Webby Award for Technology People's Voice	Won
2010	"'CNET Video"'	Webby Award for Technology People's Voice	Won
2010	"'CNET Video"'	Webby Award for Technology	Won
2009	"'CNET Video"'	Webby Award for Technology People's Voice	Won

== Former television productions ==
- CNET Central was the flagship program of CNET Video and was hosted by Richard Hart and Gina St. John (later replaced by Daphne Brogdon). It aired from 1995 to 1999 on the Sci Fi Channel and USA Network in the United States. Individual segments were hosted by Desmond Crisis, Ryan Seacrest, and Hari Sreenivasan. Reviews of software and hardware were provided by John C. Dvorak in his "Buy It, Try It, Skip It" segments. The show often ended with a segment called The Last Word featuring commentary from KIRO/CBS Radio News talk show host and commentator Dave Ross.
- The Web explored the World Wide Web as an emerging facet of computing. Hosted by Sofie Formica and Justin Gunn, the show was an hour in length and included segments called The Hall of Fame and The Hall of Shame which showcased interesting and bizarre websites respectively. The show also interviewed famous tech celebrities such as Jerry Yang and David Filo, Todd Rundgren, and Thomas Dolby.
- The New Edge was hosted by Ryan Seacrest, one of his first on-air jobs. Unlike CNET Central and The Web, The New Edge was not nearly so focused on computing; it explored all aspects of science and technology, from Magnetic Resonance Imaging to gasoline powered blenders.
- TV.COM was focused on the best the Internet had to offer. It was broadcast in syndication. Ron Reagan was a co-host.
- Tech Briefs were 90 second tech inserts for local news media. They were hosted by Richard Hart. Later renamed Tech Reports.
- Cool Tech showcased new gadgets. It was hosted by Desmond Crisis and Daphne Brogdon.
- News.com was originally hosted by Richard Hart and Gina Smith(who later left to cofound the New Internet Computer Company with Oracle chairman Larry Ellison). Hari Sreenivasan was the show's senior correspondent. Sydnie Kohara replaced Gina Smith in the third season.

== See also ==
- CNET
- CBS Interactive
- TWiT.tv
- Revision3
- TechTV
- Computer Chronicles
