= Webware =

Webware may refer to:

- A web application, application software that is accessed using a web browser
- Webware, a CNET News blog started by Rafe Needleman
- WebWare, fictional wares created by Peter Parker, the Amazing Spider-Man; see List of The Amazing Spider-Man issues
