= Veronica Belmont =

American journalist and media personality (born 1982)

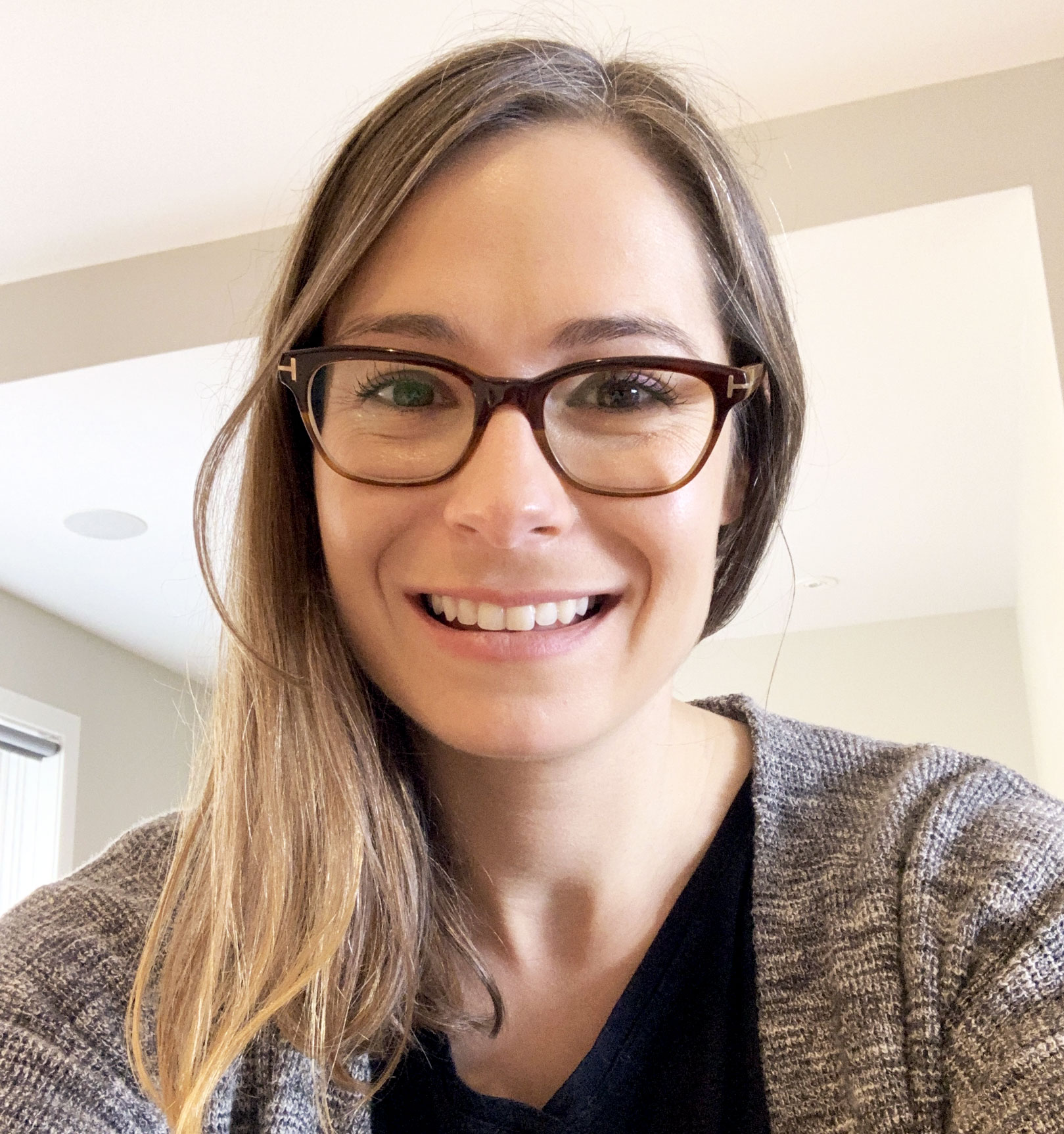
- Born: July 21, 1982 (age 44); Hartford, Connecticut, U.S.
- Education: Emerson College (B.A)
- Known for: Technology, Tech Reviews
- Notable work: Tekzilla; Buzz Out Loud
- Spouse: Ryan Block
- Website: www.veronicabelmont.com

Veronica Ann Belmont (born July 21, 1982) is an American online media personality. She was formerly the co-host of the Revision3 show Tekzilla alongside Patrick Norton. Belmont was the co-host of the former TWiT.tv gaming show Game On! along with Brian Brushwood, and the former host of the monthly PlayStation 3-based video on demand program Qore. Additionally, she was the host for the Mahalo Daily podcast and a producer and associate editor for CNET Networks, Inc. where she produced, engineered, and co-hosted the podcast Buzz Out Loud.

== Background ==
Belmont's mother was a vice president at Coleco. Belmont went to school at Conard High School in West Hartford, Connecticut before attending Emerson College, in Boston, Massachusetts, to study audio production and new media studies. After graduation in 2004, she worked briefly in Boston and eventually secured an internship at CNET. She resides in San Francisco, California with her husband, former Engadget editor Ryan Block.

Belmont learned she is Jewish through the Internet, "Quite literally, like I found out that I was … My family's Jewish and I never knew that before. And that was all because of, yeah, because of technology."

== Career ==
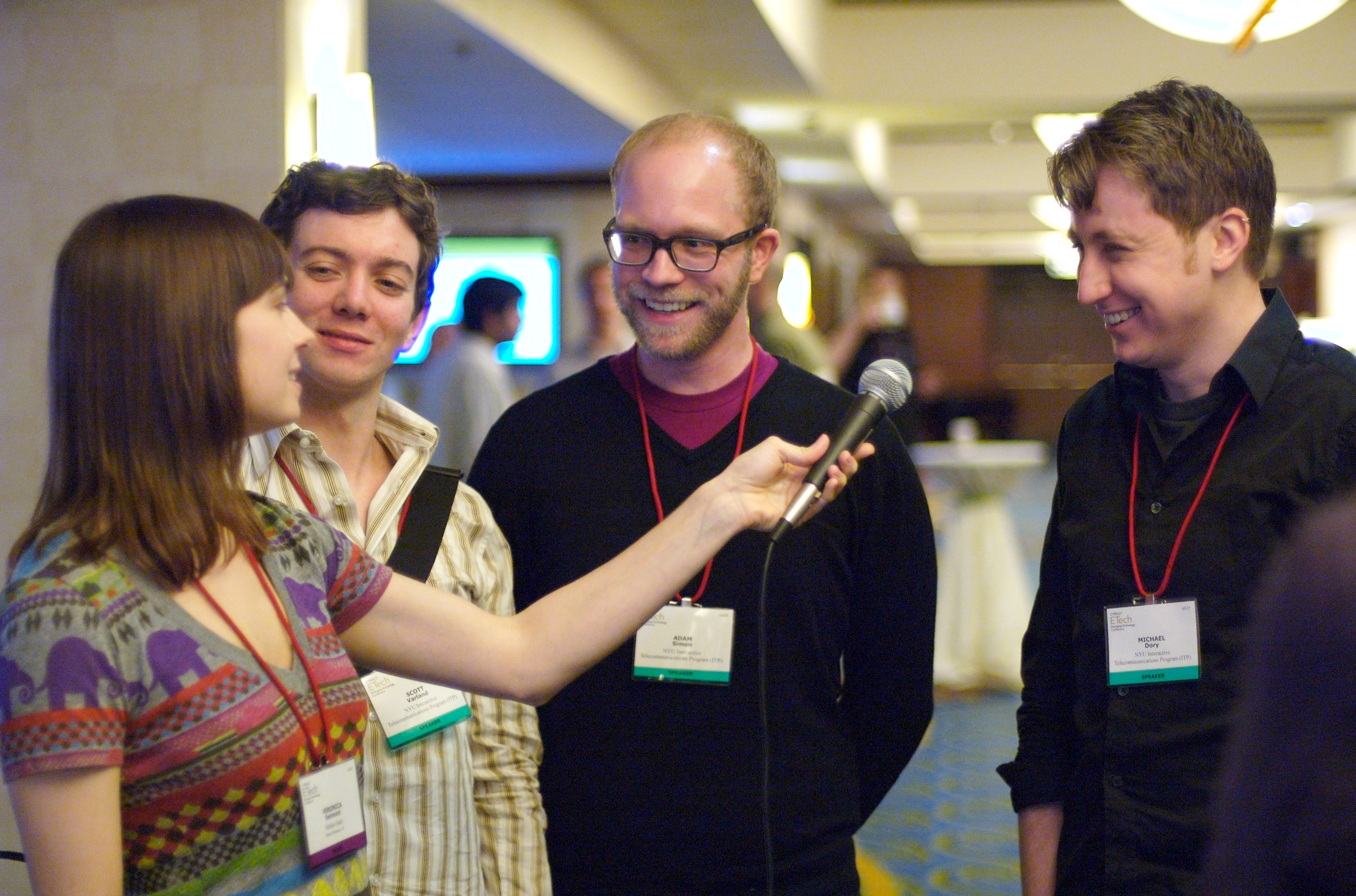
Belmont interviewing representatives of NYU's Interactive Telecommunications Program at Etech 2008

=== CNET ===
Belmont started as an intern producing audio content for CNET Networks. She was hired full-time six months later to produce their First Look from the Labs series, and also began producing Buzz Out Loud. Originally she was the sound engineer and producer of the show, but her role on the podcast grew substantially. She began to inject her own commentary and was acknowledged as an official co-host in August 2006. She also was the producer and co-host of two more CNET podcasts called MP3 Insider and CRAVE Gadget Blog, which were both co-hosted by James Kim.

Belmont made her video debut on CNET on April 6, 2006, on an Insider Secrets segment titled "Give your PC a Mac-over". Since then, she has hosted videos from Maker Faire, CES, and South by Southwest. She was also the host of the Prizefight series. She appeared for the final time in CNET TV on July 25, 2007, in the iPhone vs Nokia N95 edition of Prizefight".

=== Mahalo ===
Belmont left CNET in July 2007 to join Mahalo. She hosted and produced her own podcast called Mahalo Daily, covering subjects of her choosing. Her first video was an interview with Leeroy Jenkins at BlizzCon 2007. On April 2, 2008, Belmont announced that she would be leaving Mahalo Daily within two weeks. This was reported by TV Week on April 3, 2008.

=== Revision3 ===
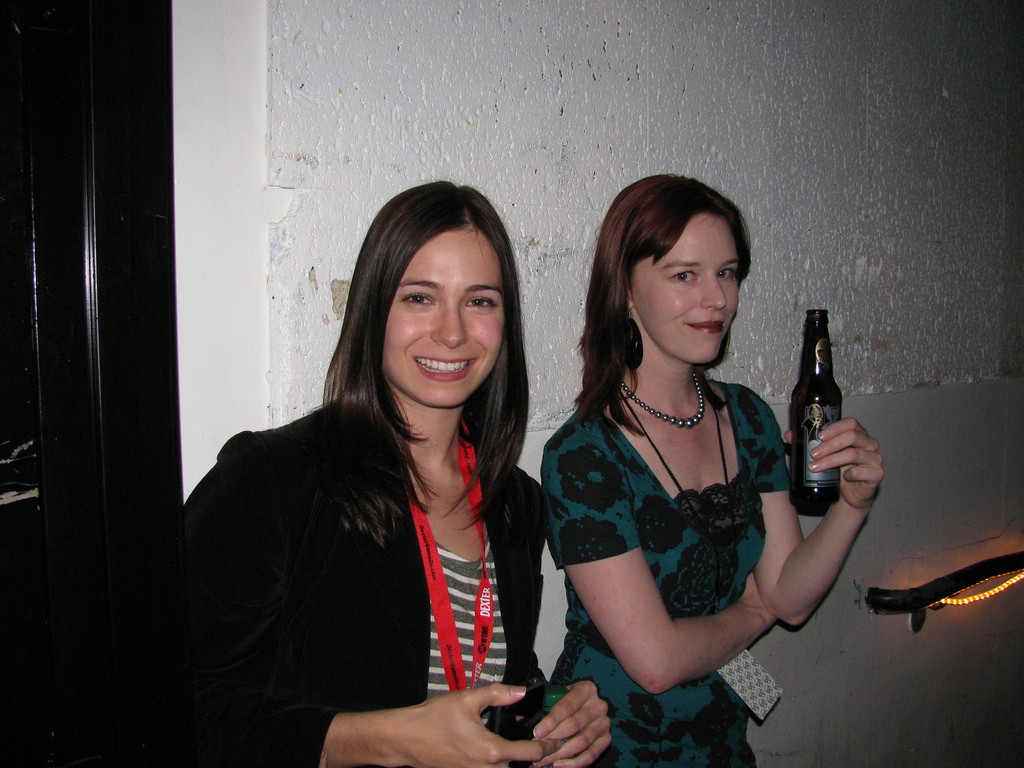
Belmont with Marian Call at ComicCon 2010

On April 9, 2008, Revision3 announced that Belmont would be joining the Revision3 staff as co-host of Tekzilla. In May 2008, she became host of Tekzilla Daily Tip.

In October 2012, Belmont began hosting Fact or Fictional, a short format show on Revision3's new YouTube channel techfeed. The show examines technology from popular fictional media and determines if the technology is or could be real.

Belmont left Revision3 in November 2013.

=== Qore ===
In June 2008, Sony Computer Entertainment announced a new subscription-based "monthly lifestyle gaming program" called Qore that would be hosted by Belmont. On October 19, 2011, she announced via her blog that she would be stepping down as host.

=== Sword and Laser ===
On October 16, 2007, Belmont started co-hosting a podcast with Tom Merritt of CNET and TWIT's Tech News Today fame. As the name implies, it is strictly about science-fiction and fantasy books and debuted with Neuromancer by William Gibson. Prior to the creation of the podcast, it was a book club in forum form. This format lasted through the first 3 books, which were, The Golden Compass by Philip Pullman, Ender's Game by Orson Scott Card and American Gods by Neil Gaiman, with the subsequent creation of the podcast.

From 2012 to 2013, a video incarnation of the show ran on Felicia Day's Geek & Sundry. Over 30 episodes were produced.

=== TWiT.tv ===
On October 30, 2011, Leo Laporte announced on This Week in Tech that Belmont would cohost TWiT's upcoming gaming show with Brian Brushwood called Game On!. The show's first official episode aired January 15, 2012, at 6:00 pm Pacific time on a live webcast in the TWiT network. The last episode of the show was uploaded on April 9, 2012.

=== Voice acting ===
In 2010's Fallout: New Vegas, she was the voice of Light Switch 01, Light Switch 02, Stealth Suit Mk II and Christine Royce.

=== BBC America ===
Gizmodo: The Gadget Testers premiered on March 18, 2013 on BBC America. Belmont is one of the co-hosts and testers who tests the latest gadgets in outrageous and extreme ways.

=== IRL podcast ===
Starting June 2017, Belmont hosted a podcast called IRL - Online Life is Real Life which is produced by Mozilla. Belmont left the podcast after season 3 and was replaced by Manoush Zomorodi in season 4.

=== Adobe Spark ===
In July 2018, Belmont became a product manager and evangelist on the Adobe Spark team.
