= Ryan Block =

American journalist

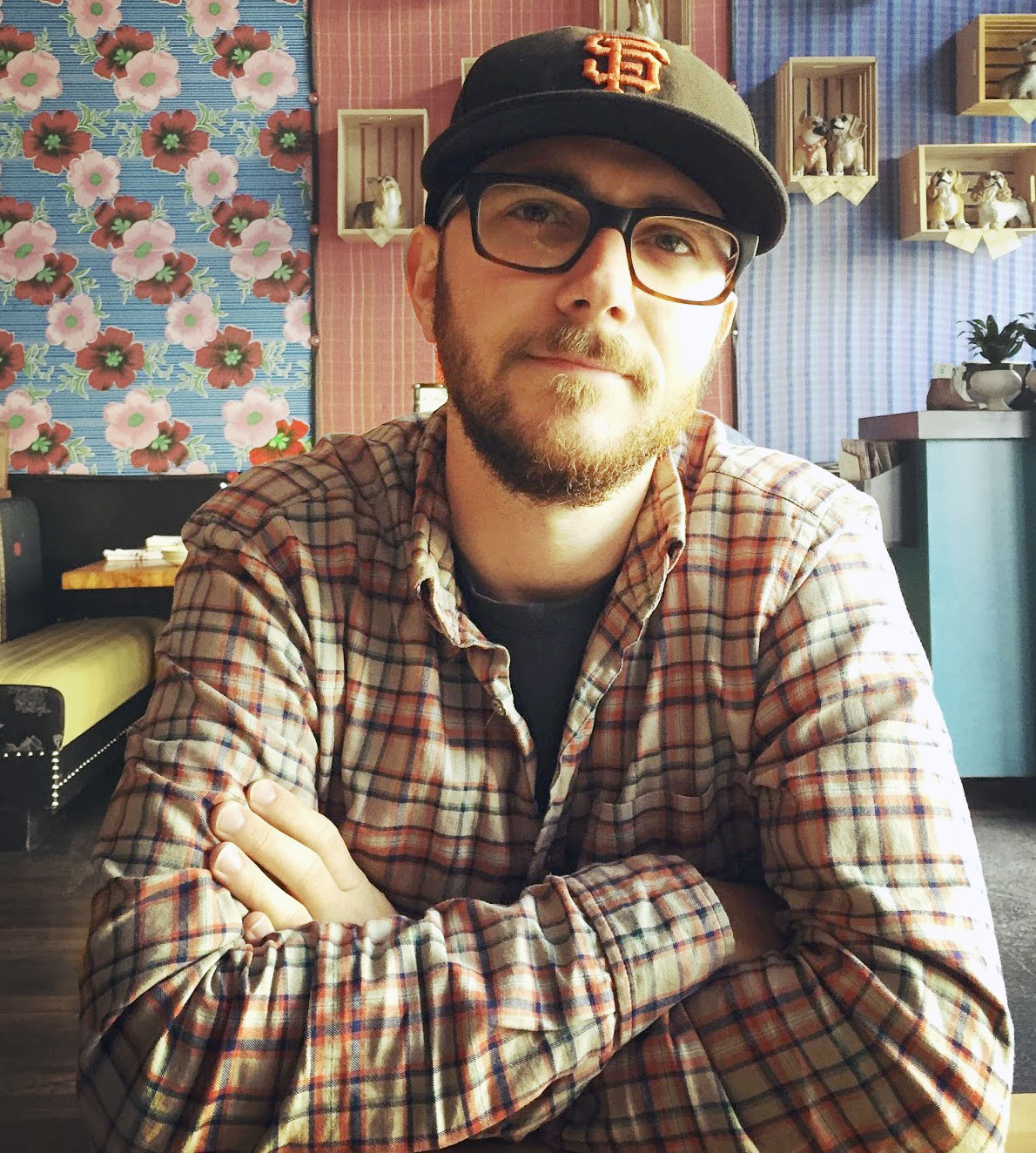
- Ryan Block; Entrepreneur
- Born: June 25, 1982 (age 44)
- Occupations: Technology entrepreneur, product manager
- Known for: Engadget, gdgt
- Spouse: Veronica Belmont

Ryan Block (born June 25, 1982) is a San Francisco-based technology entrepreneur. He was the editor-in-chief of AOL’s Engadget before he co-founded the community site gdgt. With gdgt's sale to AOL in 2013, he returned to the company and headed up its product group, but left in 2015 to start a new business.

Block co-hosted MVP, a technology podcast, with frequent collaborator Peter Rojas. There have been no new episodes since October 2, 2016.

== History ==
Block joined technology news website Engadget as a part-time reporter in June 2004, and started full-time in June 2005. He went on to replace the site's creator Peter Rojas as editor-in-chief in 2007.

In July 2008 Block posted on Engadget that he would be stepping down as editor-in-chief to create a new company, leaving then Associate Editor Joshua Topolsky in charge. On 1 July 2009, using $550,000 in initial seed financing received from Betaworks and True Ventures, Block and Rojas launched gdgt; a discussion forum that generates reviews and answers questions about thousands of gadgets. gdgt was sold to AOL in 2013 , and Block left the company in 2015.

== Comcast support call ==
In July 2014, Block and his wife attempted to disconnect their Comcast service over the telephone and were repeatedly blocked by the Comcast representative in a call which lasted 18 minutes. The last 8 minutes of this phone call was recorded by Block and posted to Reddit, immediately going viral across the internet. The next day Comcast apologized.

== Personal life ==
He lives in San Francisco, California with his wife, Veronica Belmont.
