= Brian Brushwood =

American magician, podcaster, author and comedian (born 1975)

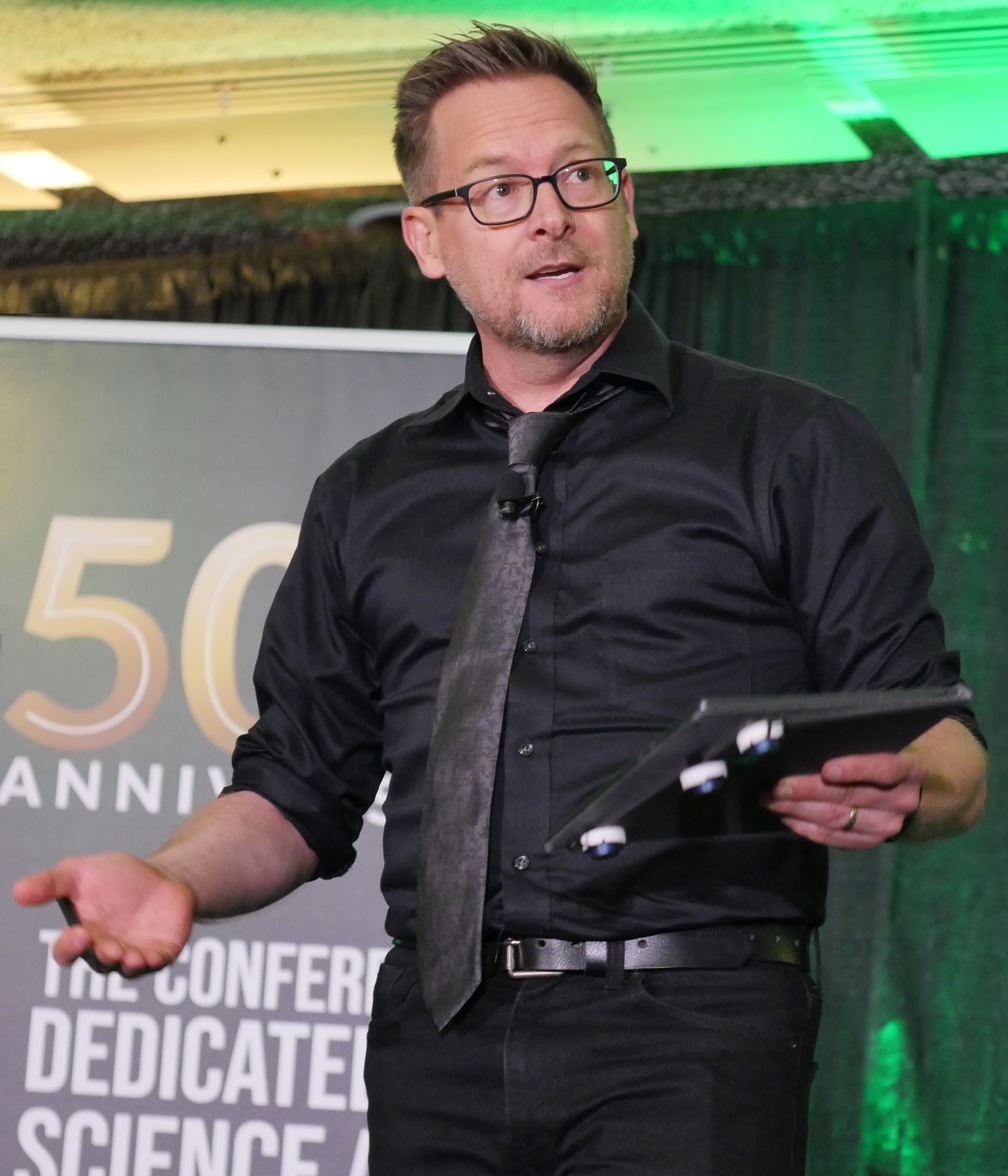
- Brushwood at CSICon 2026
- Born: Brian Allen Brushwood; January 17, 1975 (age 51); Fountain Valley, California
- Education: University of Texas at Austin
- Notable work: Scam School; Weird Things; Night Attack; Cordkillers; Hacking The System (with Jason Murphy); Modern Rogue (with Jason Murphy)
- Spouse: Bonnie Brushwood

Comedy career
- Medium: Live, television, IPTV, MP3
- Genre: Magic (illusion) YouTube
- Subjects: Confidence tricks; Fire eating
- Website: Brian Brushwood: Bizarre Magic

Brian Allen Brushwood (born January 17, 1975) is an American magician, podcaster, author, lecturer, YouTuber and comedian. Brushwood is known for the series Scam Nation (previously Scam School), a show where he teaches the audience entertaining tricks at bars so they can "scam" a free drink. The show also claims to be the only show dedicated to social engineering at the bar and on the street. In addition to Scam Nation, Brushwood co-hosts the podcasts Weird Things with Andrew Mayne and Justin Robert Young, Cordkillers with Tom Merritt, and Great Night with Young. Brushwood was also a regular guest on the This Week in Tech podcast. Brushwood performs his Bizarre Magic stage show across the United States and is the author of six books. Brushwood also co-hosted a YouTube show along with Jason Murphy called The Modern Rogue. Brushwood has appeared on national television numerous times including on The Tonight Show with Jay Leno, CNN and Food Network.

== Biography ==
Brushwood was born in Fountain Valley, California. As a child, Brushwood received a magic kit on Christmas Day one year. During his time as a student at the University of Texas at Austin, Brushwood rediscovered his interest in magic, performing his first paid shows by filling in for another magician whose schedule was too full. This interest in magic led Brushwood to perform a 45-minute magic show as his senior thesis.

As an undergraduate, Brushwood attended Rory Coker's pseudoscience class which introduced him to scientific skepticism. Coker mentored Brushwood for his senior thesis and has invited Brushwood back as an alumnus to help demonstrate concepts in his class.

Brushwood graduated from the Arts degree Plan II honors program at the University of Texas at Austin in 1997. After graduation, Brushwood married his wife, Bonnie, and began testing video games for Rockwell Semiconductors, followed by a career at Dell where he designed high-end computer systems. During his time at Dell, Brushwood moonlighted as a magician on Wednesday nights at The Electric Lounge in Austin, Texas, while The Asylum Street Spankers took their break. In 1999 Brushwood was offered a raise at Dell and realized he wasn't following his passion, so he made the decision to quit working at Dell and to start performing his Bizarre Magic show full-time.

When a television deal fell through, Brushwood decided to look into Internet broadcasting where he would be able to have more control over the product and process. After filming several episodes of Brian Brushwood: On The Road, Brushwood got the idea for Scam School. He originally intended to produce it independently but eventually sold the idea to Revision 3 and the first episode aired on April 6, 2008. Revision 3's location in San Francisco required Brushwood to travel to California to shoot episodes of Scam School, usually a dozen at a time due to travel expenses. Brushwood has stated that his favorite Scam School trick is the "Mind Control Scam." In October 2008, one of Brushwood's childhood heroes, Richard Garriott, performed a magic trick he learned from Scam School while he was aboard the International Space Station. When Discovery Digital Networks purchased Revision 3 Brushwood used it as an opportunity to move production of Scam School from the San Francisco Bay Area to Austin, Texas, where he currently lives with his wife and three children.

Brushwood is friends with fellow Austin residents Korey Coleman and Martin Thomas of Double Toasted. Urging them not to abandon the audience they had built with its predecessor Spill.com, he assisted them in setting up a Kickstarter campaign to fund the launch of Double Toasted.

== Repertoire ==
Brian Brushwood eating fire at TWiT's Grand Opening party

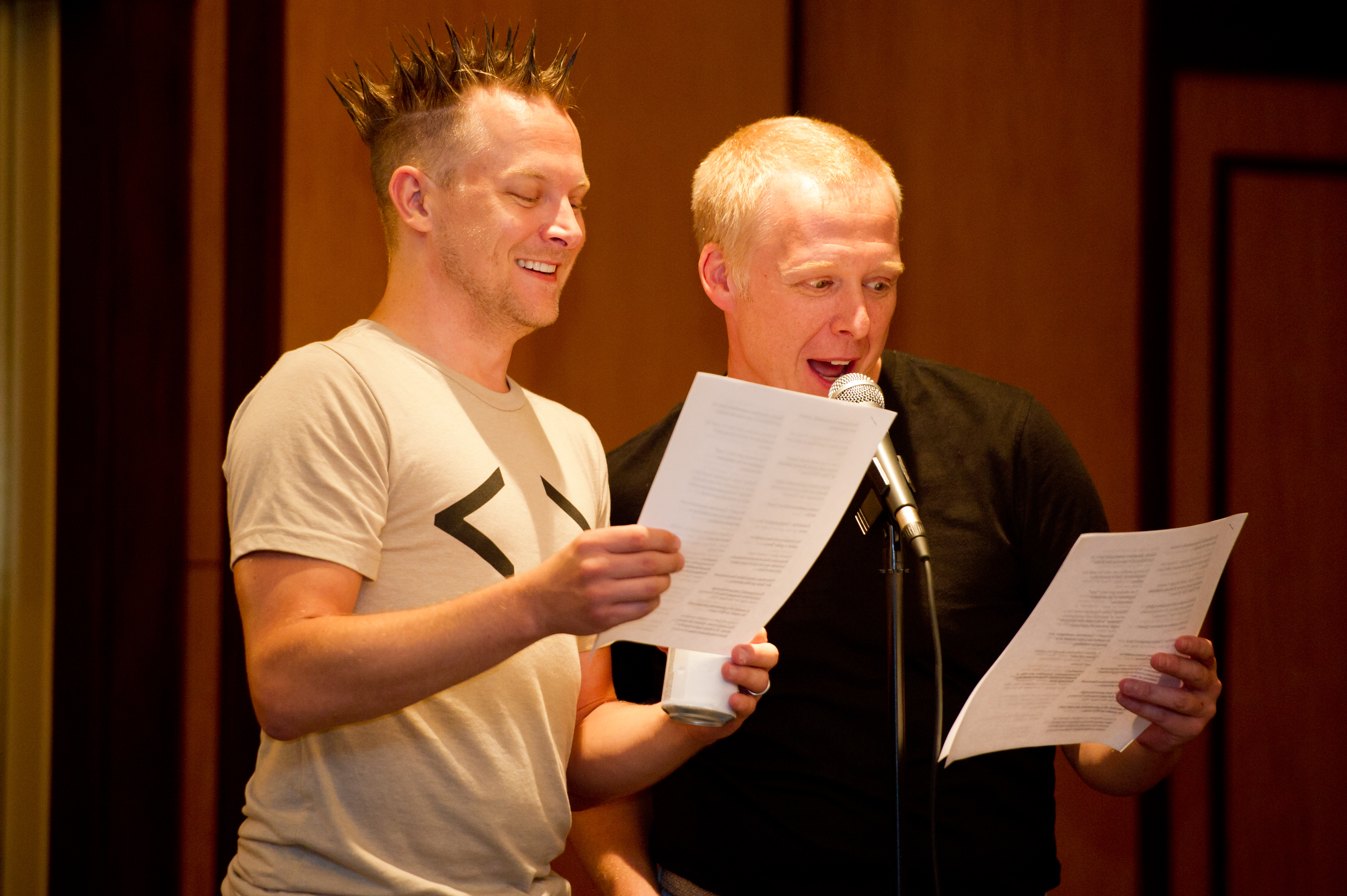
Brian "Shwood" Brushwood and Evan Bernstein during a live recording of The Geologic Podcast at Dragon*Con 2011 in Atlanta, GA

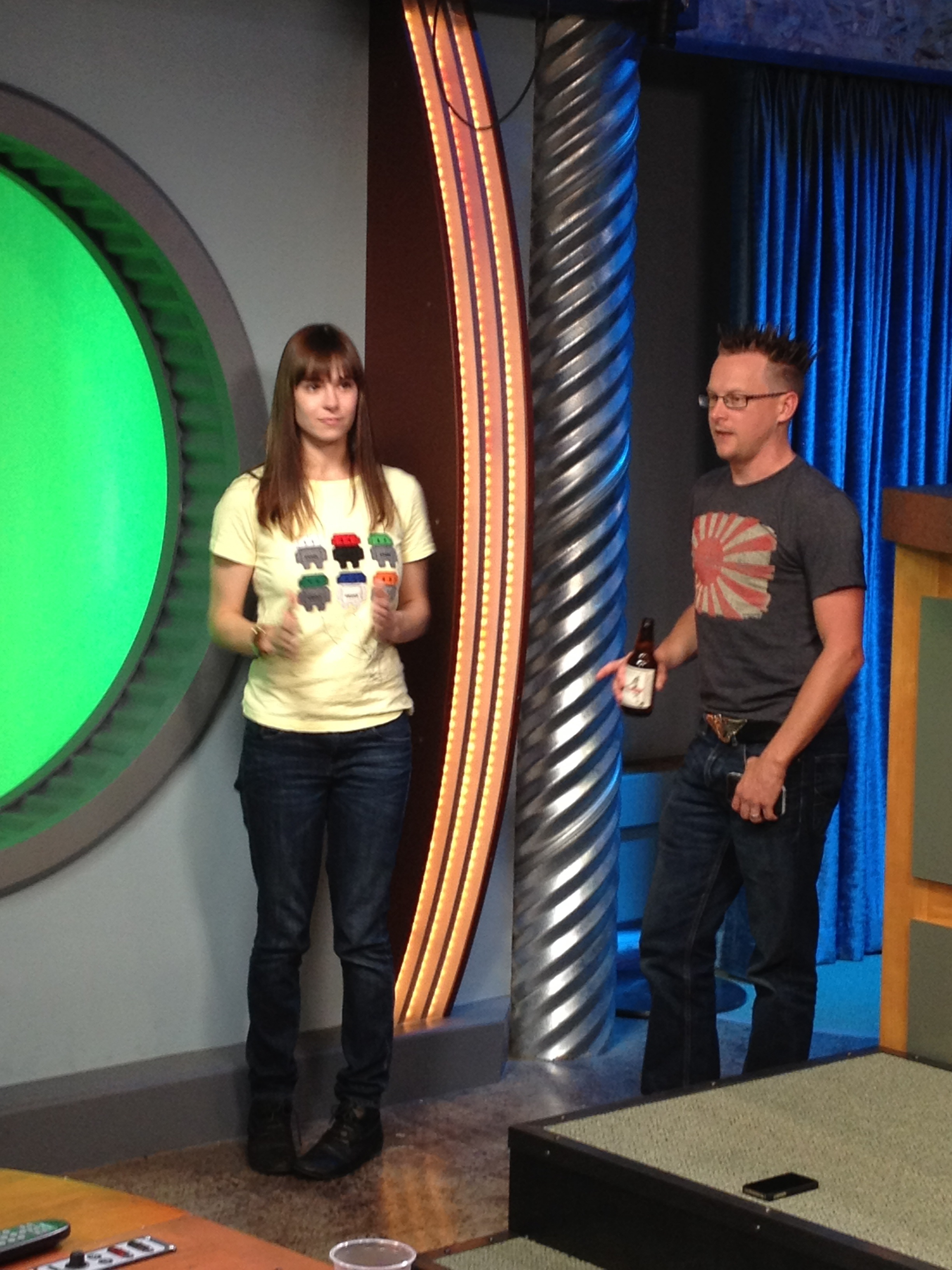
Veronica Belmont and Brushwood preparing for the Game On! internet show November 13, 2011

=== Stage show ===
Brushwood started his professional stage show in 1999 and now performs 100–200 live shows each year on college campuses across the United States. His Bizarre Magic show combines old sideshow stunts, mind reading, traditional magic and comedy. Conversations with audience members after performances inspired Brushwood to develop his Scams, Sasquatch, and the Supernatural lecture in 2004. Its content was derived from the pseudoscience course Brushwood took as an undergraduate and covers paranormal topics and how to detect fakes. Brushwood's Social Engineering: Scam Your Way Into Anything Or From Anybody lecture was initially developed for the 2009 South by Southwest Interactive panel with the same name.

In the September 3, 2010, episode of the Point of Inquiry podcast, host Karen Stollznow asked Brushwood about myth debunking in his various shows. Brushwood responded,

Part of the reason I love educating the masses as how to deceive is from my experience, because I got into magic before I took this pseudoscience and paranormal course, so I had these tools on how to fool people and I just had this vague understanding that people are really easy to fool, and it's not that we are broken, or dumb, or bad, or whatever. It's that the brain is built a certain way and magicians take advantage of that. And, it was only after taking the pseudoscience class that it crystallized everything and I realized that that's exactly what scam artists do as well. So, if I can get more people familiar with the tools and familiar with how easy it is to deceive other people, maybe more people will begin to question their own experiences.

==== Hair ====
Brushwood's signature hairstyle was modeled after Guile from Street Fighter II and took nine minutes to set up. It was maintained with pomade and beeswax. Brushwood stated he could sleep on it without the style being disturbed, and that it was low maintenance. Episode 23 of Brushwood's web series Brian Brushwood on the Road is a demonstration of how the style is created. Brushwood retired the hairstyle in 2012, citing his age and television projects as reasons for its discontinuation. As of March 7, 2018, Brushwood sports a short fringe parted to one side, complemented by a neatly trimmed beard of modest length.

==== Mr. Happypants ====
Mr. Happypants is a voodoo puppet that makes appearances in Brushwood's stage show and podcasts. Brushwood thought it would be fun if the character had a cute name but turned out to be mean, intending to come up with a better name later. While Mr. Happypants started off as a mean character he eventually evolved into pure evil and speaks through Brushwood with the assistance of a voice distorter. The first reported appearance of Mr. Happypants' evil incarnation during a stage show was in the comedy competition at a Texas Association of Magicians conference. Mr. Happypants' podcast debut was in Episode 6 of Brushwood's web series Brian Brushwood on the Road.

=== Television ===
Brushwood's first national television appearance was on the April 18, 2000, episode of The Roseanne Show talk show where he performed the trick of shoving a nail in one eye and having it pop out the other. Brushwood has appeared twice on The Tonight Show with Jay Leno where he performed the "human crazy straw" and his "spinning cups" routine. Brushwood appeared in a segment on Anderson Cooper 360° where he taught Sanjay Gupta "the human blockhead". In CNN's Life Beyond Limits Brushwood taught Gupta how to eat fire. Brushwood also discussed eating fire on Food Network's Unwrapped, and appeared on Paula's Party where he ate fire and helped make a s'more brûlée. Brushwood has also appeared on Debra Duncan, The Jenny Jones Show, Unscrewed with Martin Sargent, Steve Harvey's Big Time Challenge, and Ricki Lake.

Brushwood starred, with co-host Jason Murphy, in Hacking the System that premiered on February 27, 2014, on the National Geographic Channel.

=== Books ===
- Brushwood, Brian; Johnson, C.J. (2000), Pack the House! The Ultimate, Ever-Growing Guide to Increasing Attendance at YOUR Campus Events, Bizarre Magic, Inc., ISBN 978-0971364615
- Brushwood, Brian (2000), Cheats, Cons, Swindles, and Tricks: 57 Ways to Scam a Free Drink, Bizarre Magic, Inc., ASIN B005D38QQO
- Brushwood, Brian (2002), The Professional's Guide to Fire Eating, Bizarre Magic, Inc., ISBN 978-0971364608, OCLC 224122749
- Brushwood, Brian; Tilton, Jon (2012), Scam School Book 1: Smoke, Bizarre Magic, Inc., ASIN B007FRUNK8
- Brushwood, Brian; Tilton, Jon (2012), Scam School Book 2: Fire, Bizarre Magic, Inc., ASIN B008B8L6YM
- Brushwood, Brian; Tilton, Jon; Hughes, Brandt (2013), Scam School: Your Guide to Scoring Free Drinks, Doing Magic & Becoming the Life of the Party, Skyhorse Publishing, ISBN 978-1620878545, OCLC 816030432

=== Internet broadcasting ===
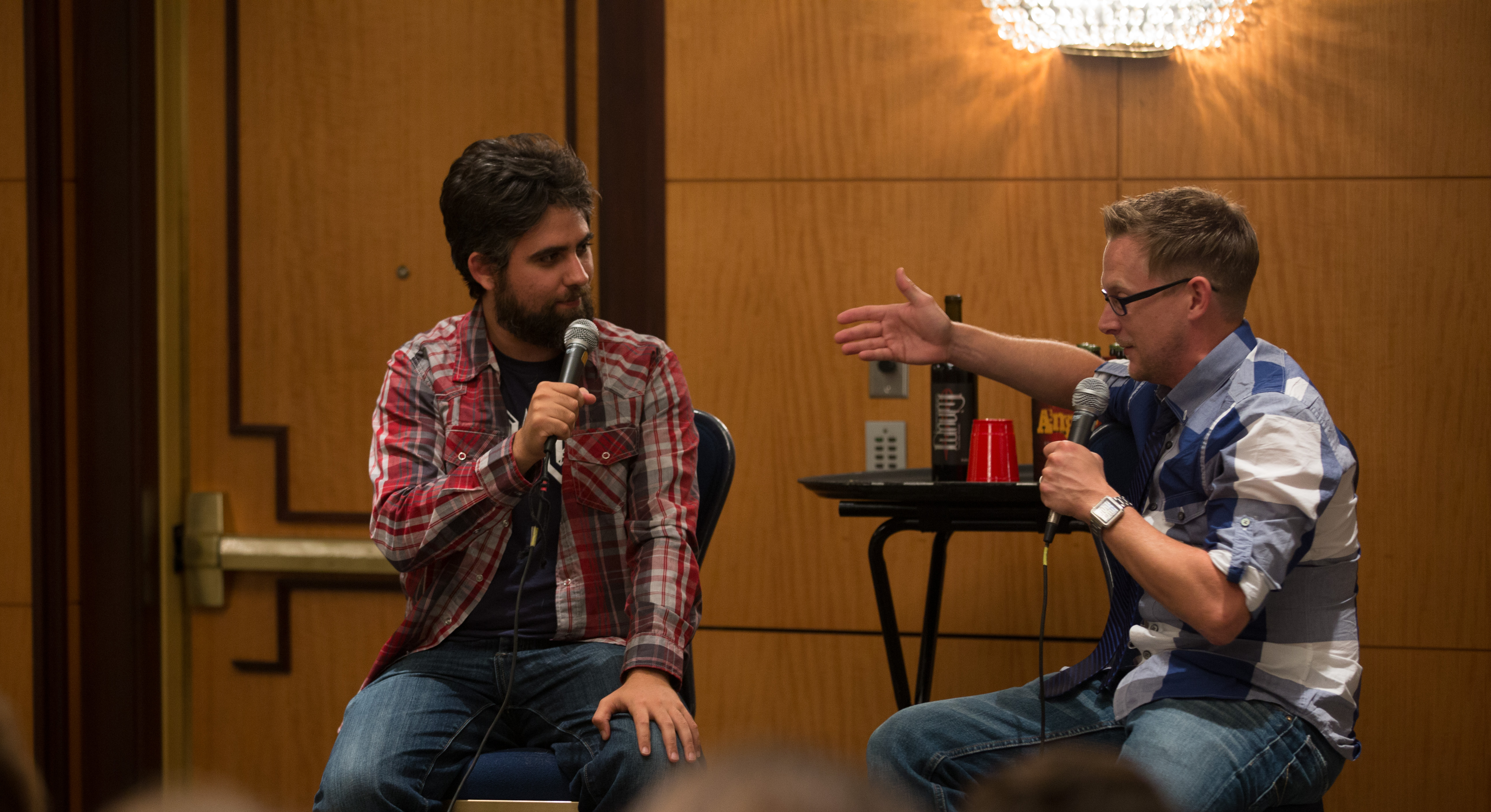
Justin Robert Young and Brian Brushwood hosting a show at Dragon*Con 2013

Show	Description	Premiere
Scam Nation (originally titled Scam School)	Brushwood explains magic, street cons, scams and entertaining tricks so watchers can "scam" a free drink off their friends.	April 6, 2008
Weird Things	Hosts Brushwood, Justin Robert Young and Andrew Mayne discuss supernatural and strange reports in the news. News reports are often introduced by Andrew Mayne presenting scenarios where his co-hosts must respond to the events of a report as Mayne reveals an increasing amount of detail. Weird Things airs live on DiamondClub.TV and Twitch on Monday afternoons.	October 19, 2009
Cordkillers	Hosts Brushwood and Tom Merritt, along with producer Bryce Castillo, discuss weekly news related to cord-cutting, including television, movies and streaming devices. It is a successor to Frame Rate, which was also hosted by Brushwood and Merritt, and aired on TWiT.tv until 2013. Cordkillers airs live on DiamondClub.TV and Alpha Geek Radio on Monday nights.	December 23, 2013
Great Night (originally titled Night Attack)	A comedy podcast hosted by Brushwood and Justin Robert Young, featuring announcer Brett Weaver and producer Bryce Castillo. It is a successor to NSFW, which was also hosted by Brushwood and Young, and aired on TWiT.tv until 2014. Great Night airs live on DiamondClub.TV and Twitch on Tuesday nights.	March 4, 2014
The Modern Rogue	Brushwood and Jason Murphy together teach what they describe as the three pillars of a Modern Rogue. Each episode focuses on one of the three pillars, teaching their audience the ways of the warrior, gentleman, and scoundrel. It is a spiritual successor to Hacking the System after the latter show's cancellation by National Geographic Channel. The Modern Rogue premieres on YouTube on Fridays.	December 14, 2015
World's Greatest Con	A narrative podcast in which Brushwood explains the hidden stories behind the most audacious con jobs, swindles and heists in history. Season 1 tells the story of Operation Mincemeat, also known as "the con that fooled Hitler." Season 2 tells five different stories of cons involving TV game shows.	June 7, 2021

=== MP3 ===
Brushwood has released three comedy albums. Night Attack was released on September 28, 2011, and charted at number four on the Billboard Comedy Albums. Night Attack 2: Enjoy the Garden was released on April 20, 2013, and charted at number one on the Billboard Comedy Albums. Night Attack (Live) was released on October 22, 2013, and charted at number one on the Billboard Comedy Albums.

== Awards ==
- 1995 – Winner – Best Comedy Magic – Texas Association of Magicians
- 1998 – Winner – Best Club Magic – Texas Association of Magicians
- 2002 – Winner – Best Stage Magic – Texas Association of Magicians
- 2003 – Voted – Variety Entertainer of the Year – campusawards.com
- 2015 – People's Choice Podcast Award for Mature – Night Attack
- 2015 – People's Choice Podcast Award for Best Video – Night Attack
- 2016 – People's Choice Podcast Award for Education – Scam School
