= James Kim =

American technical analyst (1971–2006)

- Kim with his two daughters
- Born: August 9, 1971
- Died: December 4, 2006 (aged 35); Josephine County, Oregon, U.S.
- Occupation: Technology analyst
- Spouse: Kati Kim
- Children: Penelope, Sabine
- Parent: Spencer H. Kim

James Kim (August 9, 1971 – December 4, 2006) was an American television personality and technology analyst for the former TechTV international cable television network, reviewing products for shows including The Screen Savers, Call for Help, and Fresh Gear. At the time of his death, Kim was working as a senior editor of MP3 and digital audio for CNET, where he wrote more than 400 product reviews. Kim also cohosted a weekly video podcast for CNET's gadget blog, Crave, and a weekly audio podcast, The MP3 Insider (both podcasts were cohosted with Veronica Belmont).

Kim's disappearance, death, and his family's ordeal made them the subject of a brief, but intense period of news coverage in December 2006.

== Early life ==
Kim graduated from Ballard High School in Louisville, Kentucky, in 1989, and from Oberlin College in Ohio four years later, where he double-majored in government and English and played for the varsity lacrosse team. The son of Spencer H. Kim, an aerospace company executive and internationalist, Kim and his wife, Kati, owned two retail stores in San Francisco, California.

== Career ==
Kim was most widely known as a television personality on the international cable network TechTV, where he was a senior technology analyst for TechTV Labs. Kim made frequent appearances testing new products for shows including The Screen Savers, Call for Help, Fresh Gear, and AudioFile. He was best known for his "Lab Rats" segments, in which he reviewed the latest electronic gadgets. After leaving TechTV, Kim became a senior editor for CNET, a technology trade journal, which he had joined in 2004. Kim wrote product reviews and co-hosted a weekly podcast for CNET's gadget blog, Crave. Prior to working for TechTV, he had been a legal assistant at law firms in New York and France, a media relations assistant for baseball's American League, and a script reader for Miramax Films.

== Disappearance and search ==
After spending the 2006 Thanksgiving holiday in Seattle, the Kim family (James, Kati, and their two daughters, four-year old Penelope and seven-month old Sabine) set out for their home in San Francisco. On Saturday, November 25, 2006, having left Portland, Oregon, on their way to Tu Tu' Tun Lodge, a resort located near Gold Beach, Oregon, they apparently missed a turnoff from Interstate 5 to Oregon Route 42, a main route to the Oregon Coast. Instead of returning to the exit, they consulted a highway map and picked a secondary route along Bear Camp Road that skirted the Wild Rogue Wilderness, a remote area of southwestern Oregon.

Key locations, Nov 25 – Dec 6, 2006
1 25 Nov: Tu Tu' Tun Lodge near Gold Beach, the Kim family's intended destination
2 25 Nov: Turnoff for Route 42, accessed from Route 99 off I-5
3 25 Nov: Merlin, Oregon, where the Kim family turned off I-5 for Bear Camp Road
4 25–26 Nov: Fork to BLM Road 34-8-36 from Bear Camp Road
5 26 Nov: Kim family car immobilized
6 2 Dec: Galice, Oregon, Kim's intended destination
7 4 Dec: Location of Kim's body

After encountering heavy snow at high elevation on Bear Camp Road, the Kims backtracked and ventured onto BLM Road 34-8-36 (North Fork Galice Creek Road) (42°34′28″N 123°45′01″W), a paved logging road supervised by the Bureau of Land Management (BLM) thinking that could be an option. A road gate intended to prevent such mistakes was open despite BLM rules requiring that it be closed. Media outlets reported that vandals had cut a lock on it, but a subsequent investigation showed that BLM employees had left it open to avoid trapping local hunters and others who might have ventured past it.

After 23 miles of slow travel along BLM Road 34-8-36, the Kims stopped at about 1:00 a.m. on November 26 because of fatigue and bad weather (42°41′19″N 123°46′38″W). As more snow fell around their immobilized Saab 9-2X station wagon, they kept warm by running the engine. When it ran out of fuel, they made a campfire of dried wood and magazines. Later, they burned the car's tires to signal rescuers. Search efforts began shortly after November 30, when Kim's coworkers filed a missing persons report with the San Francisco Police Department. After investigators learned that the Kims used their credit card at a local restaurant, search and rescue teams, including local and state police, more than 80 civilian volunteers, the Oregon Army National Guard and several helicopters hired by Spencer spent several days looking for them along area highways and roads, to no avail.

On December 2, Kim left his family to look for help, wearing tennis shoes, a jacket, and light clothing. He believed that the nearest town (Galice) was located four miles away after studying a map with Kati. Kim promised her he would turn back the same day if he failed to find anyone, but Kim did not return. He backtracked about 11 miles down BLM Road 34-8-36 before leaving the roadway and electing to follow a ravine northeast down the mountain.

=== Search ===
Although the Kims had a cellular phone with them, their remote location in the mountains was out of range of a cellular network, rendering the phone unusable for voice calls. Despite it being so, it would play a key role in their rescue. Cell phone text messages may go through even when there appears to be no signal, in part because text messaging is a store-and-forward service. Two Edge Wireless engineers, Eric Fuqua and Noah Pugsley, contacted search and rescue authorities offering their help in the search. On Saturday, December 2, they began searching through the data logs of cell sites, trying to find records of repeaters to which the Kims' cell phone may have connected. They discovered that on November 26, 2006, at around 1:30 a.m., it made a brief automatic connection to a cell site near Glendale, Oregon, and retrieved two text messages. Temporary atmospheric conditions, such as tropospheric ducting, can briefly allow radio communications over larger distances than normal. Through the data logs, the engineers determined that the cell phone was in a specific area west of the cellular tower. They then used a computer program to determine which areas in the mountains were within a line-of-sight to the cellular tower. This narrowed the search area tremendously, and finally focused rescue efforts on Bear Camp Road.

On the afternoon of December 4, John Rachor, a local helicopter pilot unaffiliated with any formal search effort, spotted Kati, Penelope, and Sabine walking on a remote road. After he radioed their position to authorities, they were airlifted out of the area and transferred to a nearby hospital.

Law enforcement officials said that the discovery of the cellphone connection, and the subsequent analysis of the log data, was the critical breakthrough that ultimately resulted in Kati, Penelope, and Sabine's rescue by helicopter.

== Death ==
Officials continued to search for Kim, at one point finding clothing that he had discarded along the way in the likely belief that he was too hot; paradoxical undressing is a symptom of hypothermia. Optimistic Oregon officials stated, "These were placed with our belief that little signs are being left by James for anyone that may be trying to find him so that they can continue into the area that he's continuing to move in."

On Wednesday, December 6 at 12:03 p.m., Kim's body was found in Big Windy Creek. (42°38′44″N 123°43′25″W) Lying on his back in one to two feet of icy water, Kim was fully clothed and had been carrying a backpack which contained his identification documents, among other miscellaneous items. Kim had walked about 16.2 miles (26 km) from the car to that point, and was only a mile from Black Bar Lodge, which, although closed for the winter, was fully stocked at the time. An autopsy revealed that Kim had died of hypothermia and that his body had suffered no incapacitating physical injuries. The medical examiner who performed the autopsy guessed that Kim had died roughly two days after leaving the car.

=== Route ===
Because of Kim's background as a technology analyst, observers speculated that his family had used online mapping to find their route. However, Kati told state police that they had used a paper road map, an account supported by the Oregon State Police, which reported that they had used an official State of Oregon highway one. Kati later recounted that, after they had been stuck for four days and were studying it for help, both she and Kim noticed that a box in the corner bore the message: "Not all Roads Advisable, Check Weather Conditions".

Bear Camp Road is lightly used between October and April, even by local residents, because of its difficult terrain, spotty maintenance, steep drop offs, and often inclement weather. As they drove along the road, the Kims passed three prominent warning signs that state: "Bear Camp Road May Be Blocked By Snowdrifts". Kati later told police that they had noticed only one.

== Media ==
The Kims' ordeal became a lead story on most major U.S. news networks. In the hours after Kim's body was found, it became the highest rated article on MSNBC.com with a reported one million page views. CNN.com reported 755,000 views of its coverage of the story. Within a week, the Kims appeared on the cover of People magazine.

Newspapers in the region, led by The Oregonian and the San Francisco Chronicle, devoted heavy coverage to the events and their aftermath. The Oregonian was awarded the 2007 Pulitzer Prize for a distinguished example of local reporting of breaking news, presented in print or online or both, for their coverage of the Kims' story. The staff of The Oregonian was lauded for "its skillful and tenacious coverage of a family missing in the Oregon mountains, telling the tragic story both in print and online".

On January 6, 2007, The Washington Post published an op-ed article written by Kim's father, Spencer H. Kim, criticizing various government entities that had in his estimation played roles in his son's death. Spencer blamed the BLM for not locking the gate to the logging road, privacy laws that he claimed had delayed the start of search and rescue efforts, local authorities for "confusion, communication breakdowns and failures of leadership" during the search, and the Federal Aviation Administration for not keeping media aircraft out of the search area.

On February 18, 2007, a memorial service was held for Kim at Golden Gate Park in San Francisco.

On September 12, 2007, Kati gave an exclusive interview of the ordeal to UK blogging site DollyMix.

In December 2009, Kati, Penelope, and Sabine made a surprise appearance at a Christmas party being held by the membership of Josephine County Search and Rescue.

In February 2011, the television show 20/20 aired a special two-hour episode, "The Wrong Turn", which included interviews with Kati.

In September 2011, the television show 20/20 aired a second special two-hour episode, "The Sixth Sense", which depicted the same story as in "The Wrong Turn".

On August 27, 2017, the television show SOS: How to Survive aired a one-hour episode, "Trapped in a Blizzard", which depicted the Kims' story with survival tips on how to survive in a similar situation.

== See also ==
- Snowbound: The Jim and Jennifer Stolpa Story
- Lists of solved missing person cases
