= Richard Hart (journalist) =

Richard Hart was a staple of Bay Area television throughout the 1980s on the popular Evening Magazine. EM aired at 7:30 pm nightly, with co-host Jan Yanehiro and showcased some of the interesting and often technology-based activities and happenings around the San Francisco Bay Area.

Richard Hart created and hosted The Discovery Channel television show The Next Step. He later hosted several programs for CNET TV including C|net Central (CNET's first project, which aired on the Scifi Channel), and CNET News.com, which aired weekly on CNBC.

Currently, he is an instructor in the Multimedia Communications department at the Academy of Art University in San Francisco. Hart also produces along with Steve Kotton a segment for ABC's KGO-TV in San Francisco on technology. He currently reports on emerging technologies for San Francisco's ABC7 among other TV stations.

== Awards ==
Richard Hart is the only person to have been the recipient of both an Emmy Award (for comedy) and a Alfred I. duPont–Columbia University Award (investigative reporting).

== Education and milestones ==
Richard Hart has a Physics Degree. He is on the official NASA list to be the first US space reporter journalist.
