= The Next Step (American TV program) =

- Genre: Science and Technology
- Created by: Richard Hart
- Directed by: Dan Sexton
- Starring: Richard Hart
- Country of origin: United States
- Original language: English
- No. of seasons: 5

Production
- Running time: 30 minutes

Original release
- Network: KRON; Discovery Channel
- Release: 1991 – 1996

The Next Step is a television program that aired on KRON in San Francisco and later on The Discovery Channel during the 1990s. It was created and hosted by Richard Hart and produced by Dan Sexton. The Next Step showcased the latest in cutting-edge technology and its applications from electric vehicles to virtual reality.

The final segment of each episode was dedicated to "Paul and Phil, The Answer Guys", hosted by noted radio hosts Paul Robbins and Phil Cowan. In this segment, Paul and Phil would answer technical questions mailed in by viewers. They were awarded a couple of Emmys for their work on this segment.

== Next Step 2.0 ==
Next Step 2.0 was announced in September 2006, aimed at bringing an upgraded version of the original program in High Definition. Syndication of The Next Step news segments on LiveScience was announced in December 2007.
