= Bear Camp Road =

Mountain road in Oregon

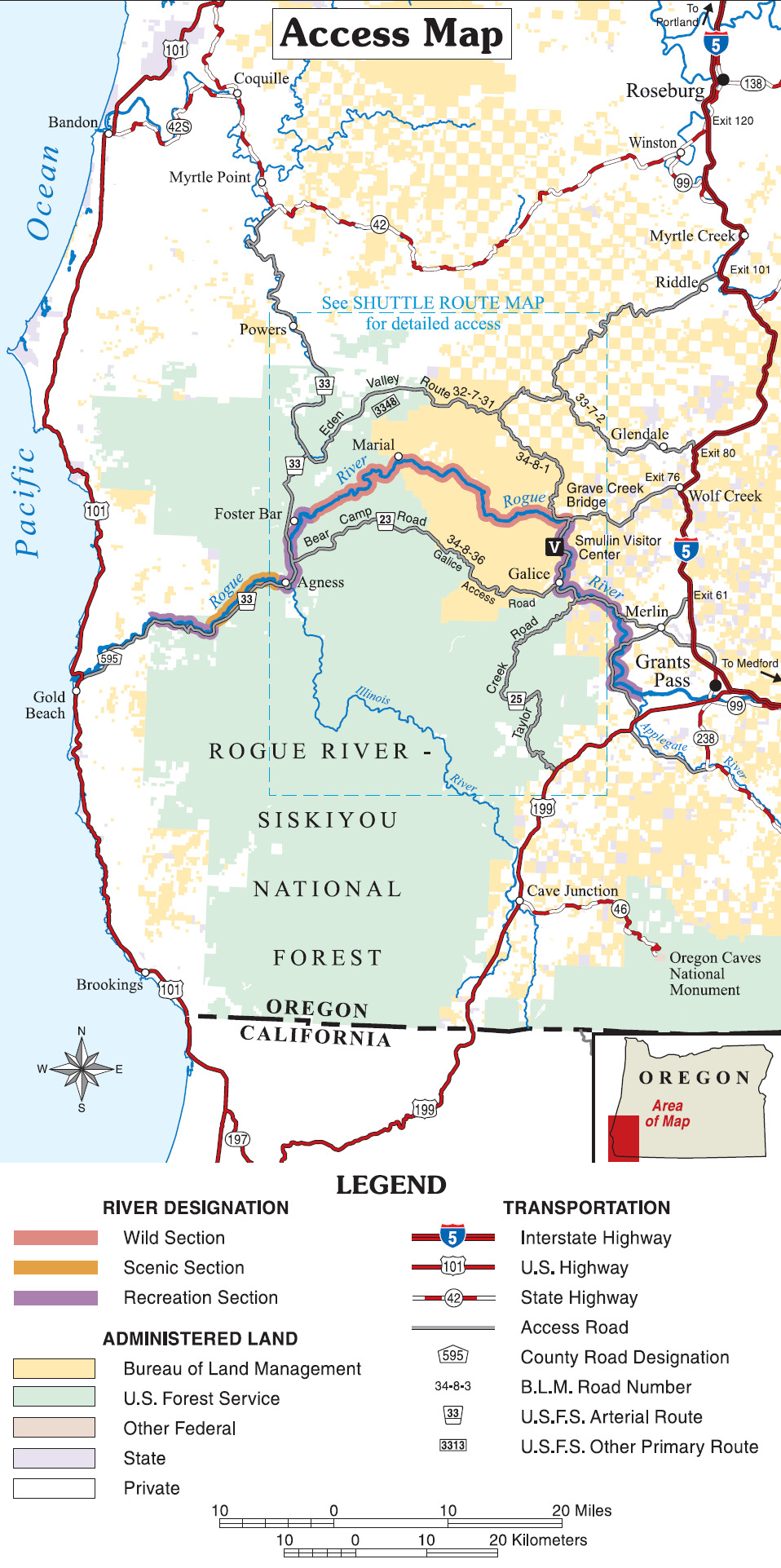
Map of Bear Camp Rd and surrounding wilderness.

Bear Camp Road is a rugged mountain road traversing the Klamath Mountains in Josephine and Curry counties in the U.S. state of Oregon. Bear Camp Road is a combination of Bureau of Land Management (BLM) Road 34-8-36 (some parts also known as Galice Access Road, Galice Creek Road, Pea Vine Road, and N. Fork Galice Creek Road) starting just south of Galice and United States Forest Service (FS) Road 23, which continues from the 12-mile (19 km) point on 34-8-36 to Agness. The road is named for a camp and viewpoint at the 4,600-foot (1,400 m) summit near the Josephine–Curry county line.

The road is a common route to recreational opportunities, including hunting and rafting, and is also the only route to the Oregon Coast between the California-Oregon border and the Rogue River. It is a paved, one-lane road with infrequent turnouts and a few gravel sections. At both ends, the road quickly climbs up to the crest of the Coast Range, and the majority of the road is at high elevation on top of a long ridge.

Bear Camp Road is a rugged, narrow, crooked road, which is extremely dangerous to travel on during the winter. Numerous motorists have been stranded for days or weeks on Bear Camp Road or one of the many gravel roads that branch off from it. Dewitt Finley and James Kim both died after being stranded on the road in winter.

== Kim family ordeal ==
Bear Camp Road came into the national spotlight in late 2006 when James Kim, his wife Kati, and their two daughters attempted to reach Gold Beach via this route. Kati claims they missed an exit on Interstate 5 to their intended route, Oregon Route 42, and decided to take Bear Camp Road instead. Late on the night of November 25, 2006, they missed signs warning of possible snow and continued up the mountain road. At the intersection of Bear Camp Road and BLM sections of the road, they decided to turn into the BLM road and eventually ended up lost 16 miles (26 km) down a side road before stopping for the night. A snowstorm trapped them at this location.

The family waited for rescue, surviving on limited resources. After spending six days waiting for rescue, James Kim left the car to seek help. He and his wife had attempted to locate their position using area road maps, and had estimated that the small town of Galice, Oregon, was only 4 miles (6 km) away. They were actually 33 miles (53 km) from the town by road.

He left the car at 7:30 a.m. on Saturday, December 2 and backtracked down the road on which they were stranded. Approximately 11 miles (18 km) down the road, he turned down into the Big Windy Creek canyon. James Kim hiked through treacherous and dangerous terrain to reach the creek, and apparently was attempting to follow it to the Rogue River in an attempt to find help.

On the following Monday, searchers found Kati Kim and her children near the car, but could not locate James Kim. Searchers traced James Kim's path down Big Windy Creek's canyon in an effort to find him. His body was recovered in Big Windy Creek on Wednesday, December 6. According to medical examiners, James Kim died of hypothermia, but a precise time of death was not known. He had walked approximately 16 miles (26 km) trying to find help.

Initial reports from government officials contained incorrect information about the position of the Kims' car and its proximity to the location where James Kim's body was found. It was first thought that the Kims' car was stranded at the intersection to the access road for Black Bar Lodge (42°39′1.25″N 123°44′54.15″W). They were actually 6 miles (10 km) from this shelter. Mapping errors caused this miscalculation, according to officials. The actual location was: 42°41′26″N 123°46′36″W

Following the conclusion of the search and recovery efforts, government officials confirmed that a gate blocking access to the road on which the Kims were stranded should have been locked, but was not. Bureau of Land Management employees dispatched to close the gate had decided against locking the gate due to the possibility of hunters being stranded inside.

Since the incident, the Forest Service and Bureau of Land Management has installed additional numerous large signs on the approaches to Bear Camp Road, warning that the road may be impassable during winter months. Also, the directional sign ("To Gold Beach and Coast") at the spot where the Kims turned onto the wrong road has been moved and replaced. At the spot, the through road is narrow and steeply uphill while the side road is much wider and more level and appears to be the proper continuation. The location and arrow direction on the old sign was confusing and ambiguous, especially in snow when it would be impossible to see that the narrow uphill road is the correct route while the wide level road is not.

== Previous incidents ==
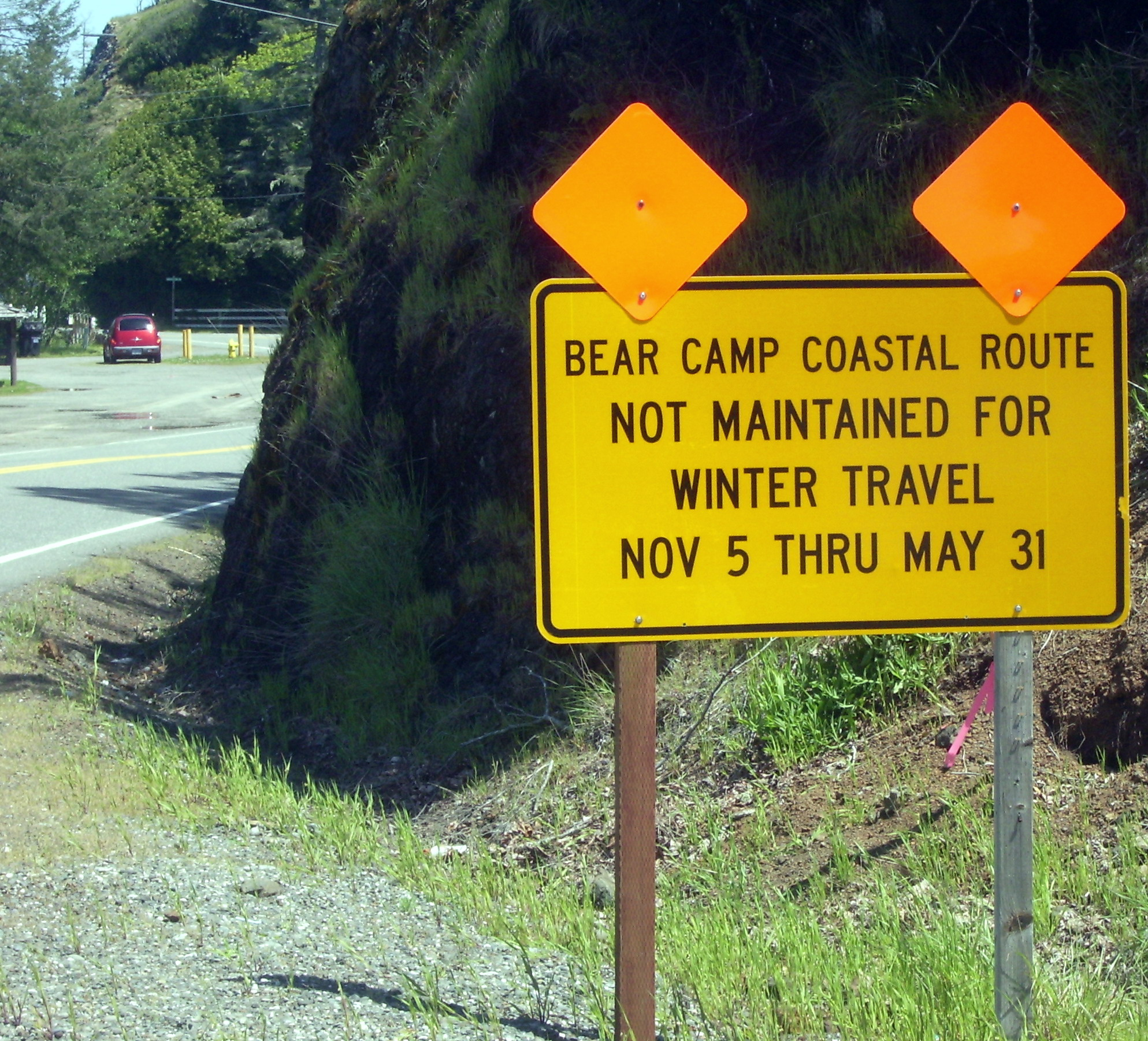
Warning sign near the west end outside Gold Beach, Oregon

=== Dewitt Finley ===
In 1994, a man traveling over Bear Camp Road died after being stranded for nine weeks. The victim, Dewitt Finley, was a camper salesman from Montana. He was attempting to drive from Gold Beach to Grants Pass and became snowbound. He kept a journal while stranded on the road, and ultimately died of starvation. His body wasn't recovered until May 1995, when it was discovered by a group of local teenagers. There is no indication that Finley ever attempted to hike out, or ever left his camper. Rather than trying to hike 18 miles to Agness, the last town he had passed, Finley apparently decided to wait for rescue. "He believed his chance was best there," Sieler said. Some accounts indicate that Finley would have likely survived if he had attempted to hike out.

Although Finley had no propane to operate the camper's furnace, he warmed himself using the truck's heater and used cushions and a bedspread to make a bed on the bench seat of the four-wheel-drive truck. The truck still had half a tank of diesel fuel when found.

In his journal, Finley wrote, "I have no control over my life its all in His Hands. 'His will be done.' Death here in another month or so, or He sends someone to save me", leading some to speculate that he looked to divine intervention and his strong religious devotion to save him, or that other psychological/emotional factors led him to "give up."

=== The Stivers ===
In March 2006 six members of an Ashland, Oregon, family were stranded in their snowbound motor home for two weeks. In addition to the two Stivers, the group included Stivers's parents, the Higginbothams; and the Stivers' two children. The RV was stranded on the spur road to Calvert Airstrip near its intersection with the BLM Glendale-to-Powers Bike Route after that road passes Marial Junction, about 15 miles (24 km) west of Glendale. Unlike the route of James Kim and his family who turned west up BLM 34-8-36 toward Bear Camp Road and Gold Beach, the Stivers-Higginbotham group took a different road, having missed the turnoff that the Kims took toward Bear Camp at the start of BLM 34-8-36. Stivers-Higginbotham's route went north through Galice and on to Grave Creek, there crossing the bridge over the Rogue River, and next, heading north up Mount Reuben Road. When they got to the Glendale-to-Powers bike route, they turned west where they later became stuck in snow on the BLM airstrip spur, while trying to head back down it after turning around at the airstrip. Their RV had become stuck north of the Rogue River in March, about 7 miles (11 km) north-northeast, geographically, from where the Kims' car was stranded in late November 2006.

Confusion about the whereabouts and intentions of the group caused law enforcement officials to call off their search after five days. Police had received conflicting information on the group's destination, and some officials considered treating the case as a kidnapping.

Inside the motor home, the family was able to see television news reports of the search effort, but became convinced that rescuers would not find them. Two of the six in the group hiked out to search for the searchers, and were found (by accident) by Bureau of Land Management employees on routine patrol. The other members of the group were rescued later that day. All were in good condition.

Family members Elbert and Becky Higginbotham were quickly arrested after Arizona officials filed warrants charging the Higginbothams with possessing methamphetamine for sale and other crimes there.

Elbert Higginbotham also faced a felony count of possession or use of a weapon in a drug offense. Becky Higginbotham, who was listed in the warrant as Rebecca Ann Bess, was also charged with possession of drug paraphernalia.
