= Tom Merritt =

American journalist

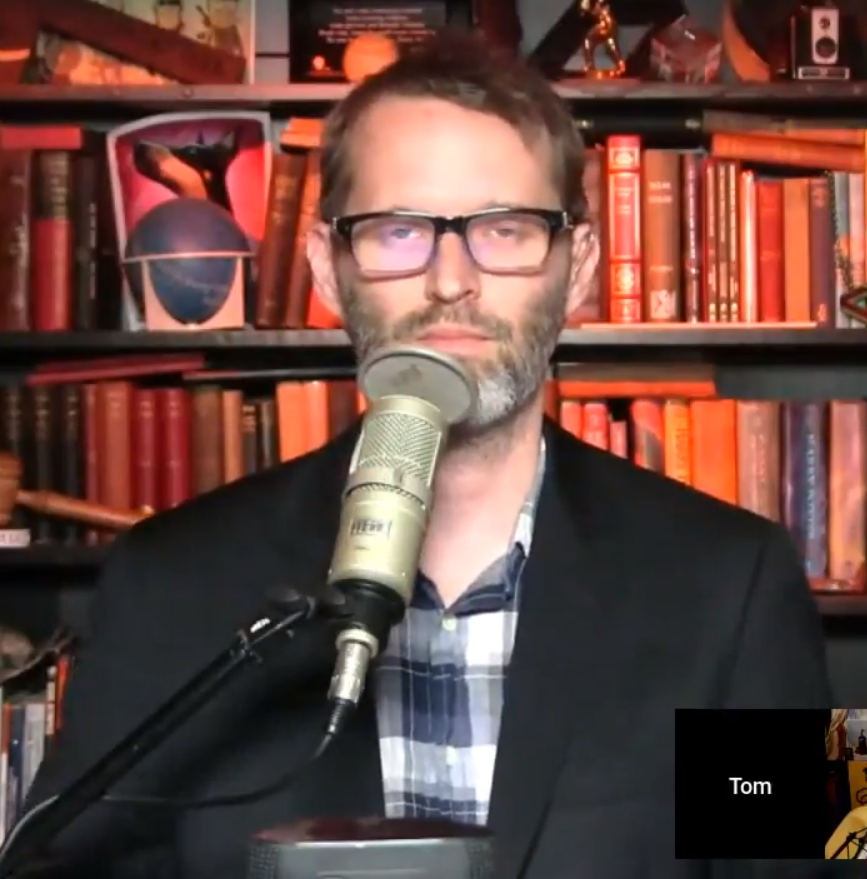
- Merritt in 2018
- Born: Thomas Andrew Merritt; June 28, 1970 (age 56); Greenville, Illinois
- Notable work: Daily Tech News Show; Tech News Today; Buzz Out Loud; CNET Top 5
- Spouse: Eileen Rivera
- Website: www.tommerritt.com

Thomas Andrew Merritt (born June 28, 1970) is an American technology journalist, writer, and broadcaster best known as the host of several podcasts. He is a former co-host of Tech News Today on the TWiT.tv Network, and was previously an executive editor for CNET and developer and co-host of the daily podcast Buzz Out Loud. As of March 2023, Merritt hosts Daily Tech News Show, Cordkillers and Sword and Laser, among other programs.

== Early life ==
Merritt was born in Greenville, Illinois, to Bill Merritt, a food scientist who worked on the Coffee-Mate project. Merritt received a BS in journalism from the University of Illinois at Urbana–Champaign and pursued graduate work in communications at the University of Texas at Austin.

== Career ==
Merritt's career in radio began in 1986 as a DJ for WGEL, a country music station located in Greenville, Illinois. During the 1990's, he and Christopher McLeod worked on WPGU, an alternative radio station in Champaign, Illinois. 1993, he worked as an intern for National Public Radio's Morning Edition. From 1999 to 2004, he worked for TechTV in San Francisco as an executive web producer and was a radio host with TechTV until 2003.

=== CNET ===
Merritt started with CNET in 2004. In addition to his duties as co-host of Buzz Out Loud with Molly Wood, he also had a regular column and podcast (co-hosted with Rafe Needleman) dealing with consumer technology. He also co-hosted the tech support call-in program CNET Live with fellow editor Brian Cooley, and was the host of CNET Top 5.

On April 16, 2010, Merritt announced that he would be stepping down as co-host of Buzz Out Loud, and that he would be joining the TWiT. Network as a full-time daily host on June 1, 2010. During his last Buzz Out Loud episode on May 14, 2010, he announced that his main focus at TWiT would be a new daily show, Tech News Today.

=== TWiT Network ===
Before joining TWiT as an employee, Merritt had a long-standing working relationship with former TechTV colleague Leo Laporte's network, having regularly appeared on This Week in Tech as either a guest or as a relief host. His independent general discussion podcast with Roger Chang, East Meets West, was also on TWiT Live.

Tech News Today was launched on June 1, 2010. Merritt was a regular host along with Sarah Lane, Iyaz Akhtar, and Jason Howell.

On joining TWiT, Merritt brought with him two shows previously produced by the cartoonist Scott Johnson's Frogpants Studios. Originally started on July 7, 2009, Fourcast had Merritt and Johnson inviting guests to discuss the future and what it might contain in a so-called virtual fireside setting. Meanwhile, Current Geek Weekly is a weekly discussion of geek culture stories and the companion podcast to the Current Geek podcasts still produced by Frogpants Studios. Merritt still appeared on the Frogpants Network for a segment called Tom's Tech Time on Wednesdays on the Scott Johnson/Brian Ibbott-hosted podcast, The Morning Stream.

On November 10, 2010, Merritt officially launched his second new show on TWiT, FrameRate. Focusing on video in its many and varied forms (television, film, Internet), Merritt co-hosted the show with the magician and NSFW podcast host Brian Brushwood.

On January 20, 2011, TWiT officially launched Triangulation, a new show with Merritt co-hosting with Leo Laporte and interviewing a notable figure in technology. In July 2012, he stopped co-hosting the show because he "wanted to work on other projects".

In addition to these regular shows, Merritt hosted live breaking news coverage of major technology events on TWiT's live stream such as WWDC, Google I/O and the resignation and death of Steve Jobs. These ware later released as TWiT Live Specials podcasts. He has acted as a relief host for Laporte on TWiT, Windows Weekly, Security Now and other shows when Laporte has been unavailable.

On October 22, 2012, Merritt announced that he would be moving to Los Angeles to accommodate his wife's new employment at YouTube, but would continue to present on the TWiT network over Skype.

On December 5, 2013, Leo Laporte announced that Merritt's contract would not be renewed, stating that the decision was based on the need for an in-studio anchor for Tech News Today. Merritt hosted his last edition on December 30, 2013.

=== Freelance podcasts ===
Since February 4, 2008, Merritt has hosted Sword & Laser, a science fiction and fantasy book club podcast, co-hosted with his former CNET colleague, Veronica Belmont.

On June 22, 2010, he launched a new show for Tom's Top 5, originally for Revision3. The show counted down a new Top 5 list every week released on Tuesday until November 1, 2011. He then did a similar show, CNET Top 5, for TechRepublic (part of CNET).

Merritt appeared in two early episodes of his Frame Rate co-host Brian Brushwood's Revision3 show Scam School.

On March 3, 2013, Merritt and Molly Wood began the It's a Thing podcast, described as a show grown from the brain of Molly Wood, derived from a regular segment on the CNET podcast Gadgettes.

In early January 2014, following his departure from TWiT, Merritt began co-hosting a podcast with Brian Brushwood called Cordkillers, while also starting a new podcast, Daily Tech News Show (DTNS).

=== Books ===
Merritt has written several books, mostly sci-fi novels. Boiling Point, which he later narrated as an audiobook, describes a near future United States civil war. Chapters of United Moon Colonies (2006) were posted on his blog. Both books were published on Lulu.com with a Creative Commons license.

=== Foxconn ===
In 2012, newspapers reported calls by consumer groups to boycott Apple products in response to accounts of worker suicides and dangerous working conditions at the Foxconn plant in China. Merritt, who has followed tech news since 2005, responded by saying, "Boycotts of Apple might be good to nudge Apple into doing something to improve conditions, but, you're going to have to boycott buying electronics if you really wanted to punish China. I'm not sure that that's called for, necessarily."

Citing a Forbes infographic showing Foxconn with, reportedly, fewer suicides per million workers (18) than the number of suicides per million Chinese citizens (220), Merritt suggested it might be worth investigating whether the lower rate at Foxconn may be due to "the fact that people who are gainfully employed are in some way less likely to commit suicide". There may be other reasons besides the working conditions at the plant for worker suicides.

Instead of boycotts, he advocated addressing the dangerous working conditions in a broader context. Comparing the conditions at Foxconn to American coal mines of the 1800s and early 1900s, he added, "There may be similar types of abuses going on at Foxconn, but we have those kinds of conditions arise because the conditions that the workers are in before they take the job are worse. That doesn't excuse the conditions, but you don't just want to get rid of the factory. You don't want to just get rid of the coal mine and send people back into abject poverty. What you want to do is put pressure on the coal mine or the factory or whatever to begin to change their ways and improve those conditions so that everybody wins."

== Bibliography ==
- Pilot-X 2017 ISBN 978-1942645313
- Boiling Point (Revised Edition) 1997 ISBN 978-0-6151-5790-0
- United Moon Colonies: Chronicles of the Clone Incident 2007 ISBN 978-1-3044-8909-8
- Chronology of Tech History 2012 ISBN 978-1-300-25307-5
- Lot Beta 2013 ISBN 978-1-304-17286-0
- Citadel 32: A Tale of the Aggregate 2015 ISBN 1312945923

== Personal life ==
Merritt is married to Eileen Rivera and they live in Los Angeles, California, with their dogs Sawyer and Rey (another dog, Jango, died of natural causes on January 25, 2017), and formerly lived in Marin County and Oakland. He is a fan of Major League Baseball's St. Louis Cardinals.
