= Rafe Needleman =

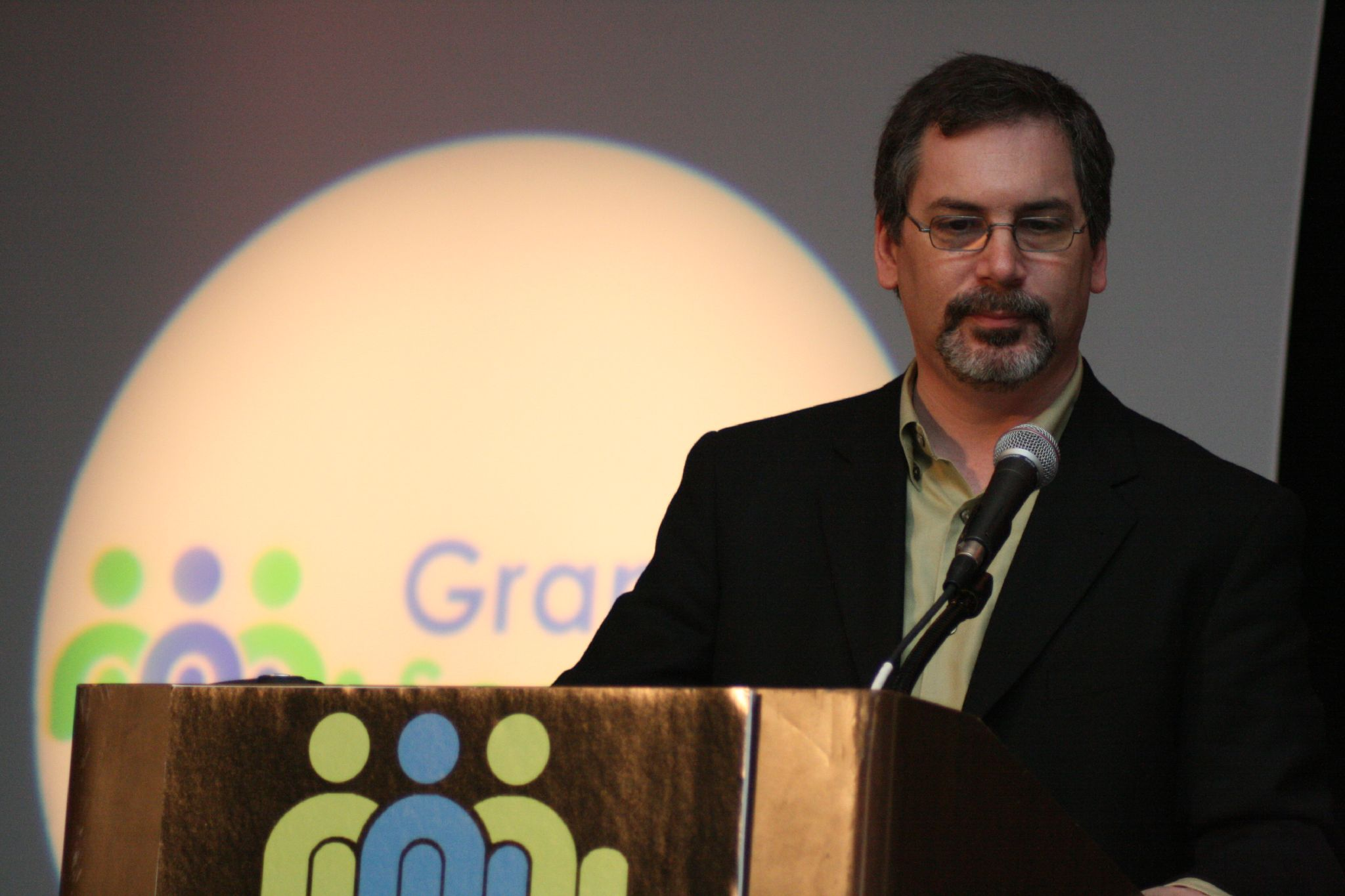
Rafe Needleman, 2007

Rafe Needleman is a magazine and website editor and published author. He wrote a Star Trek trivia book in 1980 and has covered technology and business since 1988. Previously a co-host of CNET's Buzz Out Loud Daily Podcast with Molly Wood, and CNET's To The Rescue and the Reporters Roundtable podcast and maintains the blog Rafe's Radar. Rafe left CNET in August 2012 to become the Platform Advocate at Evernote. On January 7, 2014, he posted on his Google+ account, "I can finally announce my new job. I’m going to Yahoo. I’ll be editorial director of the new Yahoo Tech site..."

== Star Trek book ==
As a young man, Needleman wrote the book The Official Star Trek Trivia Book which was published by Pocket Books.

== Tech columnist ==
He started covering technology at InfoWorld as a reviews editor. Following that, he launched Corporate Computing magazine, and then moved on to become manager of advanced technologies for ZD Labs. In 1995, he became editor-in-chief of Byte. He joined CNET as editor of CNET.com, shortly after it started in 1997.

In 1998 he moved to Red Herring, as editorial director of the Events department. After a year he became editor of Redherring.com and started writing a column about startups, which was emailed to over 150,000 subscribers every weekday.

After Red Herring folded, he continued to review cutting edge technology, both online and in print, for a Business 2.0 column called What’s Next. He returned to CNET in 2004 as editor of business technology and started the blog Webware in 2006.

He also co-hosted CNET's 'The Real Deal' podcast with Tom Merritt, which dealt with consumer technology.
