= RCRD LBL =

- Parent company: Downtown Records
- Founded: 2007
- Founder: Josh Deutsch; Peter Rojas; Elliot Aronow
- Defunct: 2013
- Status: Defunct
- Genre: Various
- Country of origin: U.S.
- Official website: www.rcrdlbl.com

RCRD LBL was a website that offered free, curated, and legal MP3 downloads from emergent artists.

Launched in 2007 by Josh Deutsch, Peter Rojas and creative director Elliot Aronow, it featured thousands of free singles, remixes, exclusive tracks and rarities from a diverse, handpicked roster of artists. The site served up millions of downloads and plays per month.

As of November 2013, the site has been taken down and there have been no new posts on the site's Facebook or Twitter feeds since May 2013.

== Management ==
- Chairman – Josh Deutsch
- General manager – Terence Lam
- Chief marketing officer – Doug Smiley
- Chief data officer - Nicole Delma
- Creative director – Elliot Aronow
