= Congressional Dish =

Political podcast

- Genre: Political
- Language: English

Cast and voices
- Hosted by: Jennifer Briney

Music
- Theme music composed by: David Ippolito
- Opening theme: Tired of Being Lied To

Publication
- No. of episodes: 347 (main episodes) (as of October 30, 2026)
- Original release: 15 September 2012
- Updates: Twice Monthly

Related
- Website: congressionaldish.com

Congressional Dish political podcast hosted by Jennifer Briney. It focuses on reporting about the United States Congress from a non-partisan perspective. A typical episode will focus on one bill or issue related to Congress.

The show has no advertisements, instead using a value-for-value funding model that relies on listeners contributing voluntary donating the amount of value to the show that they received. The model comes from Adam Curry and John C. Dvorak who use the same model on the No Agenda podcast. The model allows Briney to stay free of corporate influences and be accountable instead to the listeners.

The topics of the podcast generally focus on what Briney finds interesting at the time that is not being covered by the mainstream media. She learns most of the material for her show from Congressional hearings. Briney also does not identify politically with any political party and tries to keep the show non-partisan. Despite this Briney identifies corporate influence in politics as the major issue today and tries to spotlight when she encounters cases of it.

== History ==
Jennifer Briney had been interested in politics since 2003 when she saw the launch of the Iraq War from Bonn, Germany where she was studying at the time. She noticed how people in Germany seemed much more knowledgeable of the war than those in the United States which led to her becoming involved more politically. Briney started the podcast in 2012 after she had was unsure of her career path and wanted a more fulfilling job. She had been watching C-SPAN and noticed that people were not aware of a large portion of congressional activity. She initially tried to read every bill passed by Congress under the impression that is what Members of Congress had to do, she no longer does this but instead reads all bills passed into law, she says that it helped her learn about how Congress works.

In 2015 Briney did an AMA on Reddit that reached the front page of the site about her podcast. In 2018 Briney went on RT America's The World According to Jesse and in 2019 went on C-SPAN's Washington Journal to discuss the podcast. She has also been on The Young Turks and The David Pakman Show. Briney has had a number of guests on her podcast such as Jack Abramoff, a lawyer from Wolf-PAC, and a congressional staffer.

== See also ==
- Political podcast
