= Peter Rojas =

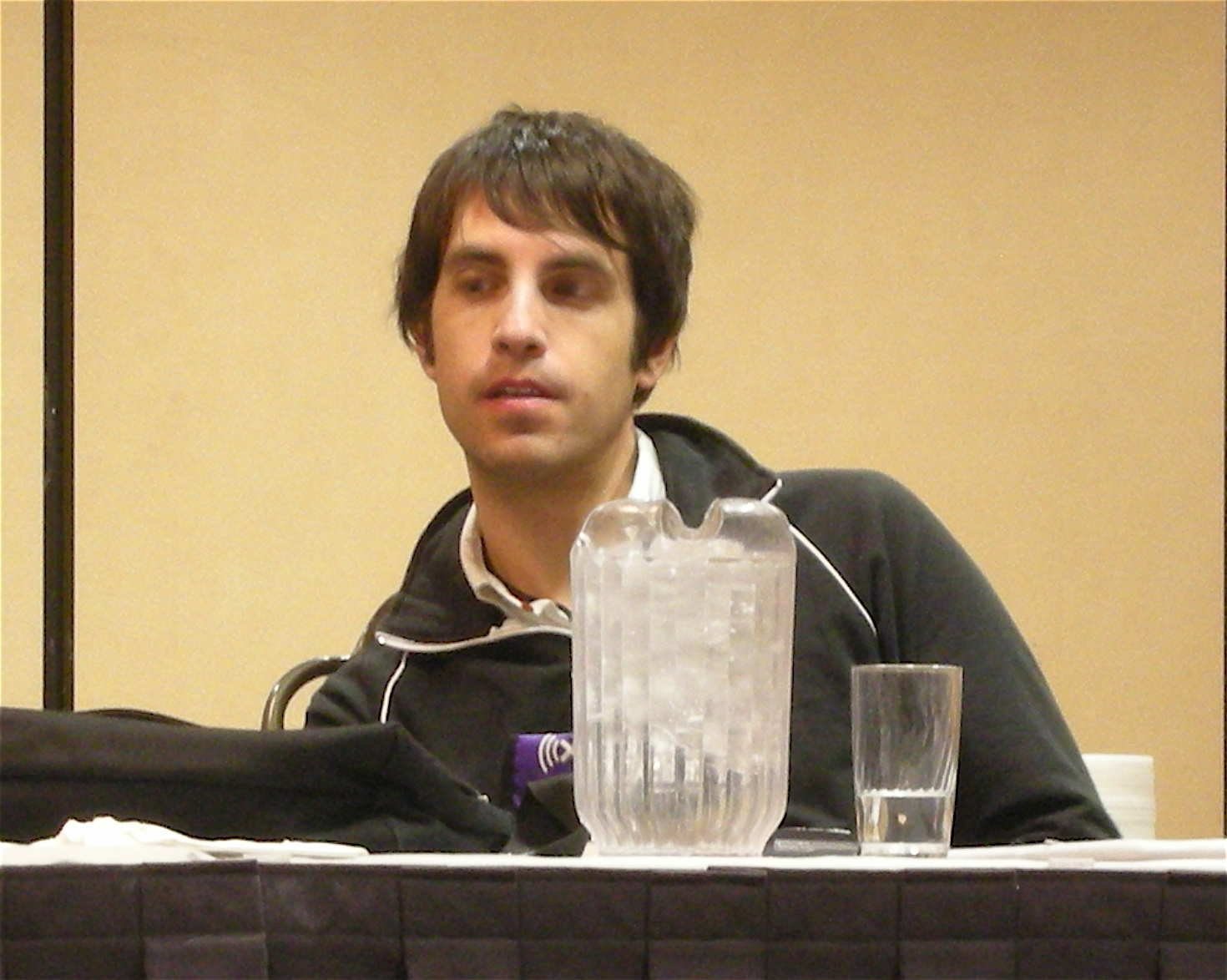
- Peter Rojas at CES 2007
- Born: March 18, 1975 (age 51)
- Education: Harvard University (BA); University of Sussex (MA)
- Known for: Co-founder of Gizmodo, Engadget, RCRD LBL, gdgt
- Spouse: Jill Fehrenbacher
- Website: roj.as

Peter Rojas (born March 18, 1975) is the co-founder of technology blogs Gizmodo and Engadget, as well as the video gaming blog Joystiq (2004).

== Education ==
Rojas attended Harvard University from 1993 to 1997 where he managed the school's radio station WHRB and was a disk jockey on the Record Hospital program. After graduating magna cum laude with a B.A. in Social Studies, Rojas received an M.A. in English Literature from the University of Sussex in 1998.

== Career ==
Rojas worked at Red Herring magazine from June 1999 to May 2001. He was co-founder and Editorial Director of Gizmodo from July 2002 until March 2004, leaving to co-found Engadget. Two months later he also founded the video game blog Joystiq. Both were part of Weblogs Inc., a blog network that was purchased by AOL in 2005.

Along with Josh Deutsch of Downtown Records, Rojas launched the online record label RCRD LBL in 2007.

In July 2008 Rojas left Engadget to start the consumer electronics social networking site GDGT. The site premiered in 2009 and was co-founded with Ryan Block, Rojas' successor as Engadget editor-in-chief.

In February 2013 GDGT was purchased by AOL.

As of July 2018, he is a partner at Betaworks Ventures. He left Betaworks Ventures in August 2021.

In February 2025, Rojas joined Mozilla as the Senior Vice President of New Products.

== Personal life ==
In July 2007, Rojas married Jill Fehrenbacher, the founder of the blog Inhabitat. The couple had a son in 2008, shortly after Fehrenbacher founded a new site named Inhabitots.
