= TAOM =

American organization which hosts magic conventions

Texas Association of Magicians (also known simply as TAOM) is an American organization which hosts magic conventions each year, in different locations around Texas each Labor Day weekend.

It started in 1944, with picnics hosted by an Austin magician named Herman Yerger, and then the formal TAOM organization was formed on September 1, 1946.

== Locations ==
=== Future conventions ===
- Dallas, 2024

=== Past conventions ===
- Houston, 2023
- Fort Worth, 2022
- Austin, 2021
- San Antonio, 2019
- Houston, 2018
- Frisco, 2017
- Corpus Christi, 2016
- Austin, 2015
- Fort Worth, 2014
- Dallas, 2013
- Houston, 2012
- San Antonio, 2011
- Austin, 2010
- Houston, 2009
- Fort Worth, 2008
- Corpus Christi, 2007
- Dallas, 2006
- San Antonio, 2005
- Houston, 2004
- Lubbock, 2003
- Fort Worth, 2002
- Corpus Christi, 2001
- Dallas, 2000
- Austin, 1999
- San Antonio, 1998
- Fort Worth, 1997
- Houston, 1996
- Lubbock, 1995
- San Antonio, 1994
- Austin, 1993
- Corpus Christi, 1992
- Tyler, 1991
- Dallas, 1990
- Houston, 1989
- Fort Worth, 1988
- Corpus Christi, 1987
- Dallas, 1986
- San Antonio, 1985
- Abilene, 1984
- Austin, 1983
- Fort Worth, 1982
- Houston, 1981
- Dallas, 1980
