= Bridget Carey =

American technology journalist

- Born: Bridget Marie Carey; June 1984 (age 41–42); Miami Beach, Florida, U.S.
- Education: University of Florida (BS)
- Notable work: CNET Update

Bridget Marie Carey (born June 1984) is an American technology journalist and host of the CNET Update. She authored the nation's first social media etiquette column, Poked, and previously hosted a popular online gadget review show, Bridget Carey's Tech Review. Her award-winning writing commentary on netiquette started at the Miami Herald and was syndicated nationwide until August 2011. She has since departed to tech media website CNET.

== Personal life ==
Carey was born in Florida and raised in the Fort Lauderdale suburb of Pembroke Pines, where she graduated from Flanagan High School. In 2006, she graduated with a BS in Journalism from the University of Florida, where she led as editor at the nation's largest student-run newspaper, The Independent Florida Alligator. While there she earned several commendations, including the Elmer Emig Award and the Dean Committee's Ruth and Rae O. Weimer Award. Carey has a daughter born in early June 2016.

== Career ==
Carey began her journalism career in 2006 as a reporter on the Herald's business desk. That year she became the newspaper's technology reporter and produced short video gadget reviews from her home computer's webcam, a series that quickly gained popularity with South Florida readers. In 2008, she began co-authoring Poked with fellow reporter Niala Boodhoo. Carey also wrote the newspaper's technology blog, "Cache and Carey," which was later renamed "The Digital Dish." Her tech reporting earned her the 2011 Green Eyeshade Award.

As viewership of her video reviews increased, the newspaper moved production to its in-house professional studio. The reviews were featured on WSFL-TV's morning show and PBS' Nightly Business Report. Her quirky consumer-angle gadget reviews, which displayed her affinity for sci-fi and other geek culture topics, made her a popular online personality.

While in Miami, she also appeared as a guest for news programs on WLRN-FM, the area's chief public radio station.

She left the newspaper to join CNET in New York as a senior editor in 2011. She hosted "Loaded", CNET's roundup of the day's tech news headlines. She replaced that in April 2012 with a more in-depth daily news program, CNET Update. As of the 11/30/2016 video posting, after 5 years, the CNET Update program will no longer be produced, with Carey expanding into other areas of CNET offerings.
