= David Ippolito =

American singer-songwriter

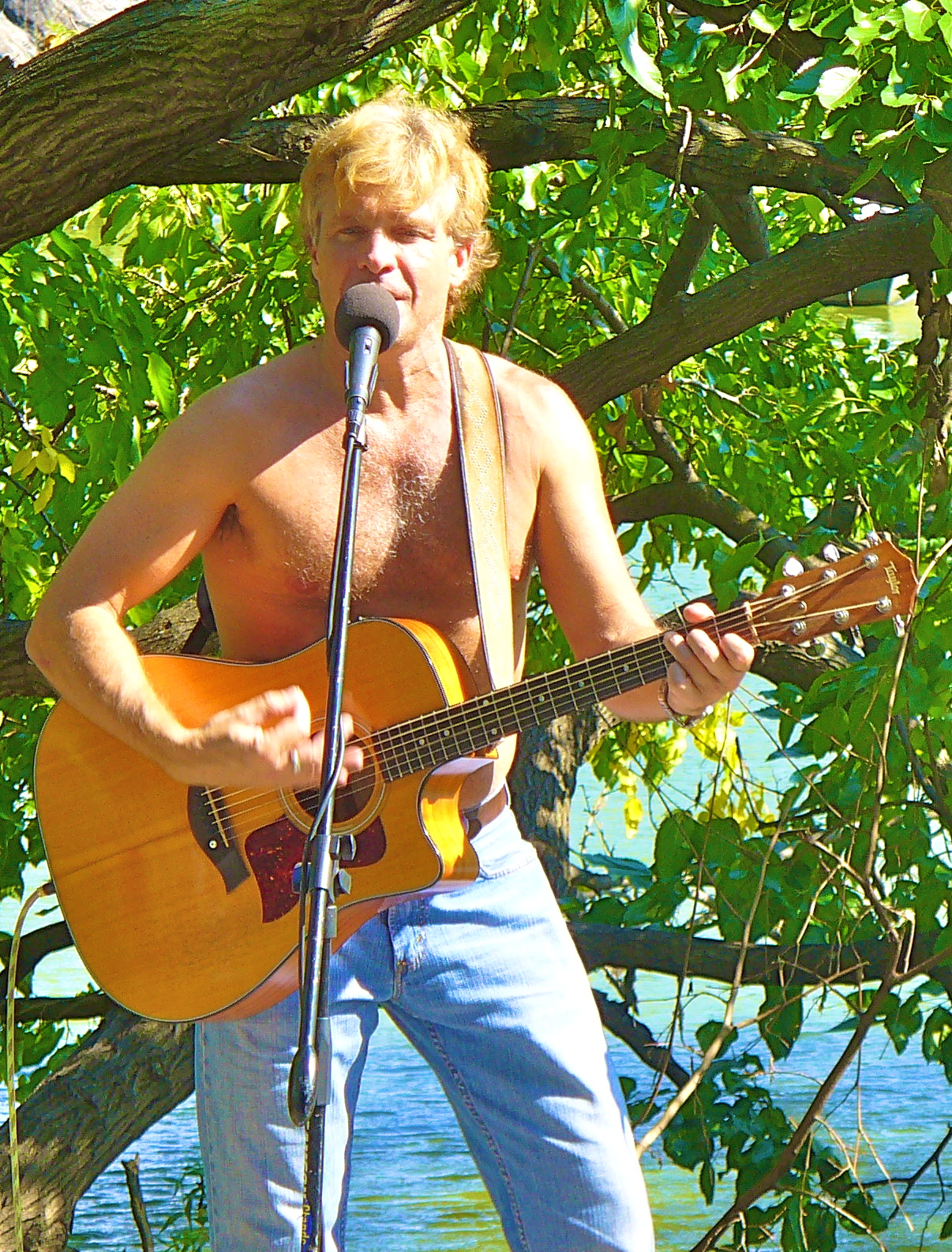
- David Ippolito in Central Park, September 2010

Background information
- Also known as: "That Guitar Man from Central Park"
- Origin: New York City
- Genres: Folk, rock
- Occupation: Musician
- Instruments: Guitar, vocals
- Years active: 1992–present
- Label: self-produced
- Website: http://www.thatguitarman.com

David Ippolito is an American singer-songwriter and playwright. He has self-released eight albums and is best known for his weekly summer performances in Central Park.

== Career ==
In 1992, Ippolito first performed an impromptu concert on a hill in Central Park in front of a small audience. Among those present was editor Jack Rosenthal from The New York Times, who the next day published an editorial about the performance. The next week, Ippolito played again, and began to gather a following. Since then, he has performed on a hill near a rowboat lake almost every summer weekend to crowds of passers-by and regulars, including international tourists, and has become a cult figure in New York.

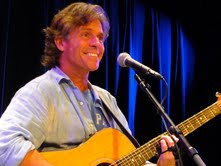
David Ippolito in NYC at Leonard Nimoy Thalia Theater

His most recent CD, "Wouldn't Want It Any Other Way", was released in 2009. The album features "Keep Hope Alive", which was co-written with Sid Bernstein, the famous music promoter who brought the Beatles to the US. Ippolito has performed at venues throughout New York City, including an annual December performance at Merkin Concert Hall, as well as shows at the Leonard Nimoy Thalia, Symphony Space, The Red Lion on Bleecker Street, and Cast Party at the Birdland Music Club.

== Central Park ==
Ippolito's Central Park concerts are relatively well-known. However, in 2000, the Parks Department ordered him (and all other musicians in the park) to unplug his small speaker, which led to outcry from his fans and letters to The New York Times by supportive audience members. The current arrangement is that he has to select a month in advance which dates he wants to play, as well as pay for each permit, rain or shine. On the Sunday after the September 11 attacks, approximately 1,000 of his fans filled his guitar case in Central Park with more than $7,000, which Ippolito, the son of a retired New York City firefighter, delivered to Ladder Company 25 and the 9/11 Fund.

== I Love the Company ==
During 2006, Ippolito hosted a daily podcast called "I Love the Company," which was broadcast globally via Podshow.com. The 365+ podcasts featured new works by Ippolito and music by singers and songwriters around the world, which was joined by an "I Love the Video" videocast.

== Playwriting and other work ==
As an actor, Ippolito has had roles in national TV commercials and musical theater productions. Ippolito's song, "City Song," was used to close NBC's television coverage of the 2001 New York City Marathon. He has appeared on ABC's "Who Wants to Be a Millionaire", winning $64,000. A playwright and storyteller, his work has been performed at The Soho Playhouse and The Actors Studio. Ippolito is currently workshopping his new musical project for the stage, "Possibility Junkie."

== Discography ==
- The People on the Hill (1997)
- That Guitar Man from Central Park...In Person (1998)
- Just a Thought for Christmas (1999)
- It's Just Us (2000)
- Crazy on the Same Day (2002)
- Talk Louder (the Cell Phone Song) (2003)
- Common Ground (2004)
- I Love the Company (2007)
- Crazy on the Same Day (re-mastered in 2008)
- Wouldn't Want It Any Other Way (2009)
