= Galice, Oregon =

Unincorporated community in the state of Oregon, United States

- Unincorporated community
- Location within Oregon Location within the United States
- Coordinates: 42°34′11″N 123°35′46″W
- Country: United States
- State: Oregon
- County: Josephine
- Time zone: UTC-8 (Pacific (PST))
  - Summer (DST): UTC-7 (PDT)
- ZIP code: 97532
- Area codes: 458 and 541

Galice is an unincorporated community in Josephine County in southern Oregon, United States. It is at the eastern end of Bear Camp Road.

== History ==
Galice was officially settled in 1852 as a mining community, deriving its name from one of its founders, Louis Galice. It was at first called Galiceburg, and located on Galice Creek upstream from the Rogue River. Today it sits on the Rogue, downstream from the junction with Galice Creek. The creek was a hot spot for gold prospecting in the 1850s.

The community received a post office in 1876, and by 1905 had a school, as well (with 11 students in the first class). By 1922, however, the Post Office was moved down the river, and it closed entirely in 1927. The school, too, closed in the late 1940s.

Logging replaced mining as the town's principal industry in the mid 20th century, before giving way in turn to the tourist trade. Hellgate Canyon, located nearby, was the site of filming for parts of John Wayne's 1975 film Rooster Cogburn. Today the site holds a small number of tourist businesses.
