= Turquoise Jeep Records =

Independent record label

- Founded: 2009
- Founder: Flynt Flossy, Whatchyamacallit
- Genre: Hip hop, R&B
- Country of origin: U.S.
- Official website: turquoisejeep.com

Turquoise Jeep Records is an independent record label founded by rappers Flynt Flossy and Whatchyamacallit. It is best known for its YouTube videos including "Lemme Smang It" (by Yung Humma featuring Flynt Flossy) and "Did I Mention I Like to Dance." Currently, the label has three albums, titled Keep the Jeep Riding, Existing Musical Beings, and Eclectic Catapilla, as well as four singles.

== History ==
Rappers Flynt Flossy and Whatchyamacallit founded Turquoise Jeep Records and released the label's first song "Stretchy Pants" as a YouTube video on March 15, 2009. The label continued to make music videos and release them to YouTube, signing new artists.

Turquoise Jeep toured throughout 2011–2013 and continued to release new material. Flynt Flossy and Yung Humma also appeared on the track "Fuck Your Blog" by Childish Gambino.

In 2013, the group released a freestyle collaboration with Humma, Flossy, and Whatchyamacallit.

On December 23, 2013, the group released their second album, Existing Musical Beings.

Turquoise Jeep has posted instructional dance videos under the name Flow with the Floss.

== Artists ==
Current members:

- Flynt Flossy
- Whatchyamacallit
- Slick Mahony
- Pierre Cashmere
- Thomas Scratch Beats (Production Team)

Past members:

- Yung Humma
- Pretty Raheem
- MoonRock

== Discography ==
Group albums

- Keep The Jeep Ridin' (2010)
- Existing Musical Beings (2013)
- Eclectic Catapilla (2017)

Solo albums

- F. Floss InternatioKnown (2015)
- Flynt Flossy - Perplexed Portrait (2020)
