= G4 Underground =

- Genre: Reality/Newsmagazine
- Presented by: Morgan Webb
- Country of origin: United States
- Original language: English
- No. of seasons: 1
- No. of episodes: 6

Production
- Running time: 30 min.

Original release
- Network: G4
- Release: March 29 – December 31, 2009

G4 Underground is a cable television newsmagazine program that aired on G4 and was hosted by Morgan Webb. G4 Underground was described as having a similar format of ABC's 20/20, except it takes a look at many topics that most major news programs don't cover such as Porn 2.0, urban spelunking and Salvia divinorum.
