= Engadget =

Technology blog website

- Website type: Blog
- Available in: English
- Editor: Aaron Souppouris
- General manager: Sarah Priestley
- Parent: Weblogs, Inc. (2004–2011); AOL Inc. (2011–2017); Oath (2017–2019); Verizon Media (2019–2021); Yahoo! Inc. (2021–2026); Static Media (2026–present)
- Website: www.engadget.com
- IPv6 support: Yes
- Commercial: Yes
- Registration: Optional
- Launched: March 2004; 22 years ago
- Current status: Online

Engadget (/ɪnˈɡædʒɪt/ in-GAJ-it) is a technology news, reviews and analysis website offering daily coverage of gadgets, consumer electronics, video games, gaming hardware, apps, social media, streaming, AI, space, robotics, electric vehicles and other potentially consumer-facing technology. The site's content includes short-form news posts, reported features, news analysis, product reviews, buying guides, two weekly video shows, The Engadget Podcast, The Morning After newsletter and a weekly deals newsletter. It was acquired by Yahoo! Inc. in September 2021 and sold to Static Media in March 2026.

== History ==
Engadget was founded by former Gizmodo technology weblog editor and co-founder Peter Rojas. Engadget was the largest blog in Weblogs, Inc., a blog network with over 75 weblogs, including Autoblog and Joystiq, which formerly included Hackaday. Weblogs Inc. was purchased by AOL in 2005.

Launched in March 2004, Engadget was one of the internet's earliest tech blogs. It gained a reputation for reporting on gadget announcements, along with rumors and leaks about upcoming products. In its early days, the site often included opinion within its articles. The original leadership also introduced the weekly Engadget Podcast, which covered tech and gadget news from the week.

On December 30, 2009, Engadget released its first mobile app for the iPhone and iPod Touch. It was relaunched in 2017, but has since been discontinued.

Overnight, on July 15, 2013, Tim Stevens stepped down as the editor-in-chief, placing gdgt's Marc Perton as the interim executive editor. In November 2013, a major redesign was launched that merged gdgt's features into Engadget, such as the database of devices and aggregated reviews. The changes aimed to turn Engadget into a more extensive consumer electronics resource, similarly to CNET and Consumer Reports, aimed towards "the early adopter in all of us".

In April 2014, Michael Gorman was named the editor-in-chief of Engadget, alongside Christopher Trout as executive editor. In April 2017, Trout was announced as the new editor-in-chief, with managing editor Dana Wollman promoted to executive editor. In September 2018, it was announced that Dana Wollman would take over as editor-in-chief.

On December 2, 2015, Engadget introduced a redesign, as well as a new editorial direction with a focus on broader topics influenced by technology; Gorman explained that "the core Engadget audience—people who are very much involved in the industry—pay attention to it closely, but the new editorial direction is really meant to make it approachable for folks outside of that realm." The site's broader focus beyond hardware and short-form blog posts continues to this day. As of 2023, Engadget publishes more than two dozen stories on an average weekday, including short-form news posts, in-depth features, product reviews, buying guides, news analysis, and opinion pieces. Engadget also produces The Morning After newsletter, sent out Monday through Friday, a weekly deals newsletter typically released on Thursdays, and The Engadget Podcast. The podcast is currently hosted by deputy editor Cherlynn Low and senior reporter Devindra Hardawar, with new episodes released on Fridays. In 2023, Engadget launched two weekly video series, The Morning After starring UK bureau chief Mat Smith (who also writes the newsletter of the same name) and an as-yet unnamed gaming-related series hosted by senior reporter Jessica Conditt.

In February 2024, the site laid off roughly one-third of its editorial staff, including editor-in-chief Dana Wollman, managing editor Terrence O'Brien, and executive video producer Brian Oh. The site was reorganized to focus on SEO and growing affiliate revenue.

On March 3, 2026, it was reported that Yahoo would be selling Engadget to Static Media.

== Awards and honors ==
=== Awards ===
In 2018, Engadget won a Webby Award for "Best Writing" in the "Websites and Mobile Sites" category. The site also received honors three times from the Society for Features Journalism between 2019 and 2020, including two features by then-staffer Chris Ip and one by contributor Megan Giller.

=== Official Best of CES Awards ===
In 2013 it was announced that Engadget would be the new judge of the official Best of CES Awards. Engadget's partnership with the Consumer Technology Association (CTA), the group that organizes CES, continued through CES 2021. For CES 2022 and CES 2023, Engadget issued "Best of CES" awards independent of any partnership with the CTA.

== Controversies ==
=== William Shatner and Twitter verification ===
On June 21, 2014, actor William Shatner raised an issue with several Engadget editorial staff and their "verification" status on Twitter. This began when the site's social media editor, John Colucci tweeted a celebration of the site hitting over one million Twitter followers. Besides Colucci, Shatner also targeted several junior members of the staff for being "nobodies", unlike some of his actor colleagues who did not bear such distinction. Shatner claimed Colucci and the team were bullying him when giving a text interview to Mashable. Over a month later, Shatner continued to discuss the issue on his Tumblr page, to which Engadget replied by defending its team and discussing the controversy surrounding the social media verification.

=== SB Nation ===
In early 2011, eight of the most prominent editorial and technology staff members left AOL to build a new gadget site with the CEO Jim Bankoff at SB Nation. On leaving, Joshua Topolsky, former editor-in-chief, is quoted having said, "We have been working on blogging, technology that was developed in 2003, we haven't made a hire since I started running the site, and I thought we could be more successful elsewhere".
