= Molly Wood =

American journalist

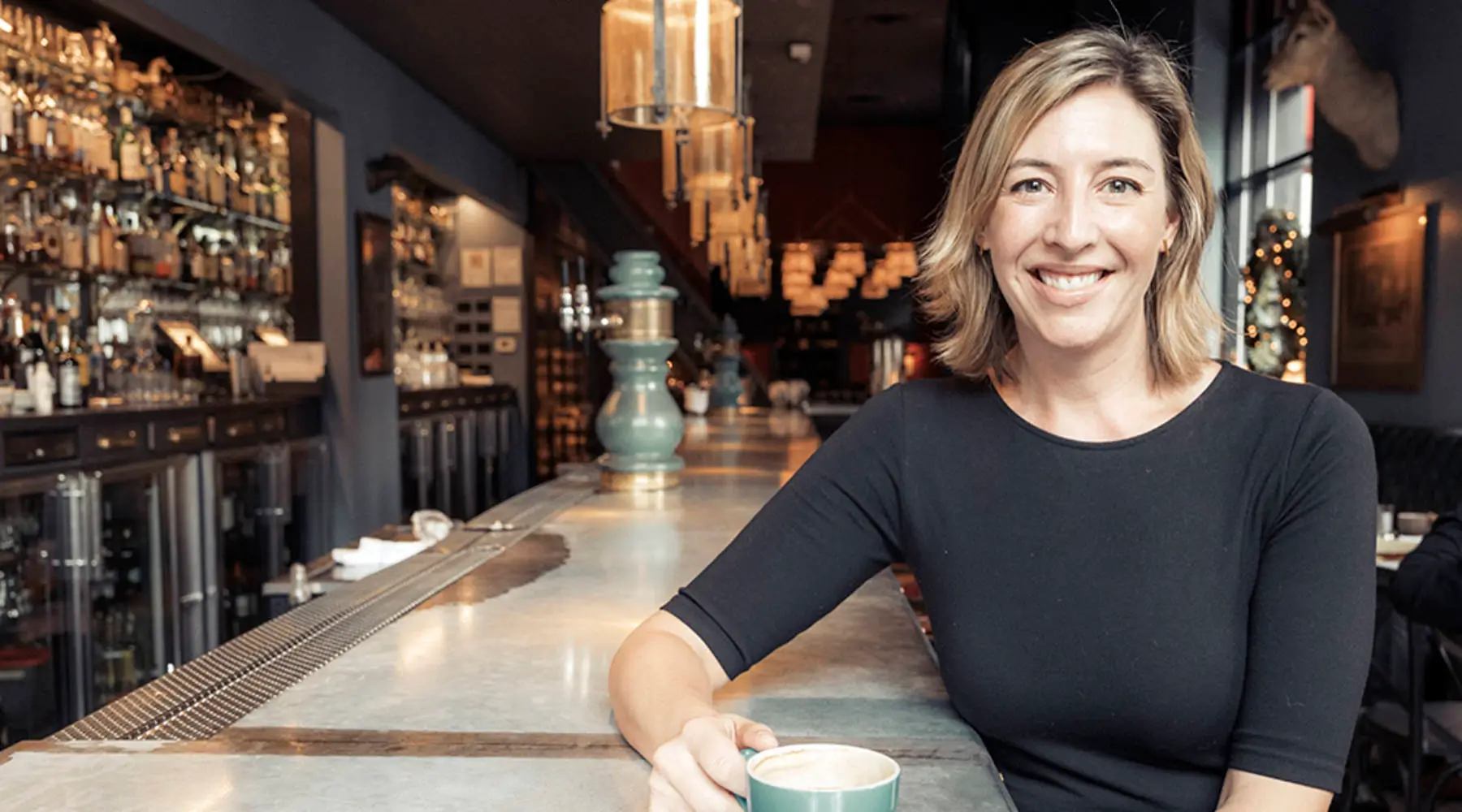
- Image of Molly Wood for a podcast she hosted with Kai Ryssdal “Make Me Smart with Kai and Molly“
- Born: Molly Kristin Wood
- Education: University of Montana
- Known for: Marketplace, Marketplace Tech, podcasting
- Notable work: Buzz Out Loud; The Buzz Report; CNET Mailbag; CNET Tech Review; Molly Rants Blog; Gadgettes podcast; Always On; Make Me Smart podcast; Marketplace Tech; This Week in Startups podcast

Molly Wood is an American podcast host and journalist.

== Early life and education ==
Molly Wood studied journalism at the University of Montana. During her senior year she was the editor of the weekly student newspaper, the Montana Kaimin.

== Career ==
Before becoming a technology journalist, she worked at the Associated Press. Looking to get away from the negative aspects covering of hard news, she moved to California and took a job at MacHome Journal, where she said she discovered that she had always been a geek. She worked at CNET from 2000 to 2013, first as an editor. She later co-hosted the Buzz Out Loud podcast, "The Buzz Report", a web-based news show, and Always On, a talk show. She joined The New York Times in 2014 as a deputy technology editor. The following year, Wood became a tech correspondent and backup host for the US public radio program Marketplace and its various spinoffs. There, she co-hosted the Make Me Smart and Marketplace Tech podcasts. She left Marketplace in 2021 to join Launch, a venture capital firm, where she was a podcaster and investor. She left in March 2023 to found Molly Wood Media, an "angel investing and startup advisory firm".
