= List of fictional robots and androids =

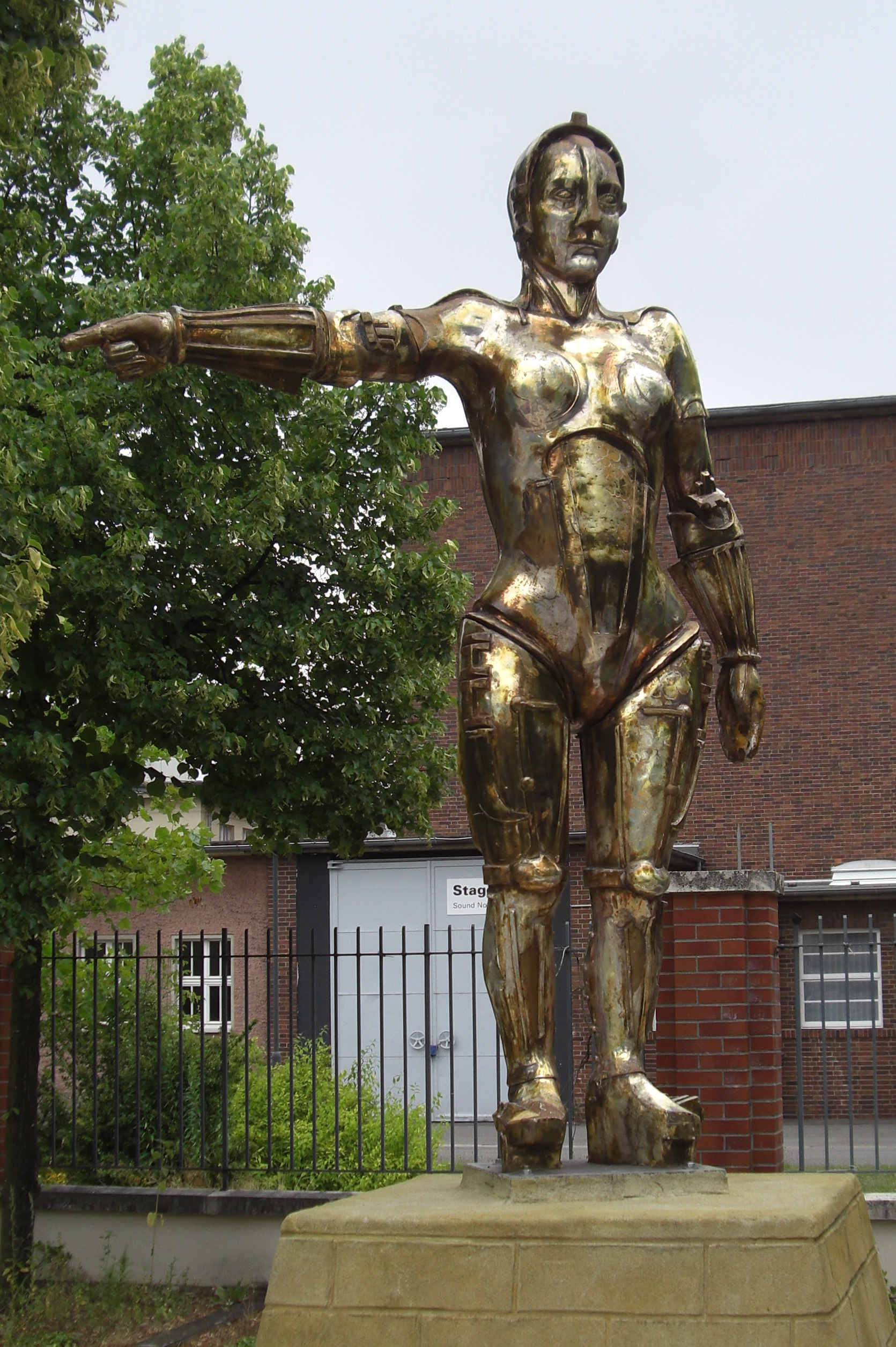
"Maschinenmensch" from the 1927 film Metropolis. Statue in Babelsberg, Germany.

This list of fictional robots and androids is chronological, and categorised by medium. It includes all depictions of robots, androids and gynoids in literature, television, and cinema; however, robots that have appeared in more than one form of media are not necessarily listed in each of those media. This list is intended for all fictional computers which are described as existing in a humanlike or mobile form. It shows how the concept has developed in the human imagination through history.

Robots and androids have frequently been depicted or described in works of fiction. The word "robot" itself comes from a work of fiction, Karel Čapek's play, R.U.R. (Rossum's Universal Robots), written in 1920 and first performed in 1921.

== Theatre ==
- Coppélia, a life-size dancing doll in the ballet of the same name, choreographed by Marius Petipa with music by Léo Delibes (1870)
- The word robot comes from Karel Čapek's play, R.U.R. (Rossum's Universal Robots), written in 1920 in Czech and first performed in 1921. It was performed in New York 1922 and an English edition was published in 1923. In the play, the word refers to artificially created life forms. Named robots in the play are Marius, Sulla, Radius, Primus, Helena, and Damon. The play introduced and popularized the term "robot". Čapek's robots are biological machines that are assembled, as opposed to grown or born.
- Oliver and Claire, retired humanoid helper-bots, the main characters in the musical Maybe Happy Ending (2024).

== Literature ==
=== 18th century and earlier ===
- The woman forged out of gold in Finnish myth The Kalevala (prehistoric folklore)
- From 600 BC onward, legends of talking bronze and clay statues coming to life have been a regular occurrence in the works of classical authors such as Homer, Plato, Pindar, Tacitus, and Pliny. In Book 18 of the Iliad, Hephaestus the god of all mechanical arts, was assisted by two moving female statues made from gold – "living young damsels, filled with minds and wisdoms". Another legend has Hephaestus being commanded by Zeus to create the first woman, Pandora, out of clay. The myth of Pygmalion, king of Cyprus, tells of a lonely man who sculpted his ideal woman, Galatea, from ivory, and promptly fell in love with her after the goddess Aphrodite brought her to life.
- The 5th-century BCE Chinese text, the Liezi, contains a description of a humanoid machine which can sing and dance like a human. The automaton is presented to King Mu of Zhou by its inventor, but it offends the king by winking at court ladies and trying to flirt with them, so the inventor disassembles it to show the court that it is a machine. The king sees that it has artificial analogues of human organs, which are made of leather, wood, glue, and paint, and each fulfill necessary functions for its operation.
- Talos, bronze giant Talos in Apollonius of Rhodes' Argonautica, 3rd century BC.
- Brazen heads, attributed to numerous scholars involved in the introduction of Arabian science to medieval Europe, particularly Roger Bacon (13th century).
- Talus in The Faerie Queene, a 1590 poem by Edmund Spenser, wherein an "iron man" mechanically helps Arthegall dispense justice.
- Golem – The legend of the Golem, an animated man of clay, is mentioned in the Talmud. (16th century).

=== 19th century and later ===
Format	Year	Name	Author	Appears In	Notes
Short Story	1814	Olimpia	E. T. A. Hoffmann	Der Sandmann	Automaton who captivates the hero Nathanael so much he wishes to marry her.
Novel	1818	Unnamed	Mary Shelley	Frankenstein; or, The Modern Prometheus	Artificial human-like being created by Victor Frankenstein
Novel	1868	Unnamed	Edward S. Ellis	The Steam Man of the Prairies	Mechanical man powered by steam.
Novel	1880	Hadaly	Auguste Villiers de l'Isle-Adam	The Future Eve	Hadaly, a mechanical woman run by electricity. The novel is credited with popularizing the word "android"
Opera	1881	Olympia	Jacques Offenbach	The Tales of Hoffmann	Appears in Act I. Based on the Hoffmann story.
Novel	1883	Atmophytes	Didier de Chousy	Ignis	Ignis is one of the first works of fiction to talk about the revolt of the machines
Novel	1885	Unnamed	Luis Senarens	Frank Reade and his Electric Man	A mechanical man run by electricity.
Short Story	1891	Unnamed	William Douglas O'Connor.	The Brazen Android	First appeared in The Atlantic Monthly/
Short Story	1893	Unnamed	Jerome K. Jerome	The Dancing Partner	Jerome noted for Three Men in a Boat.
Novel	1897	Unnamed Martian robots	H. G. Wells	The War of the Worlds	Mecha-like tripods that the Martians use to conquer the Earth.
Novel	1899	Unnamed	Ernest Edward Kellet	The New Frankenstein	An inventor creates an "anti-phonograph" that according to the narrator "can give the appropriate answer to every question I put", and installs in it a robotic female body that "will guide herself, answer questions, talk and eat like a rational being, in fact, perform the part of a society lady." The android proves convincing enough to fool two suitors who wish to marry her.
Short Story	1899	Unnamed	Ambrose Bierce	Moxon's Master	A robot chess-player. First published in the San Francisco Examiner on 16 Aug. 1899.
Novels	1899–1903	Metal men	Gustave Le Rouge	La Conspiration des Milliardaires ('The Billionaires' Conspiracy') and two sequels	Automata designed by a Thomas Edison-like scientist.
Novel	1900	The Cast-Iron Man	L. Frank Baum	The Magical Monarch of Mo	
Novel	1901	Mr. Split	L. Frank Baum	Dot and Tot of Merryland	
Novel	1907	Tik-Tok and The Iron Giant	L. Frank Baum	Ozma of Oz	The movie Return to Oz was largely based on this book.
Play	1921	Sulla, Marius, Radius, Damon, Helena, Primus	Karel Čapek	R.U.R. (Rossum's Universal Robots)	Credited with coining the term "robot". In its original Czech, "robota" means forced labour, and is derived from "rab", meaning "slave." R.U.R. depicts the first elaborate depiction of a machine take-over. Čapek's robots can also be seen as the first androids: they are in fact organic.
Novel	1923	Bénédict Masson	Gaston Leroux	La Machine à assassine ('The Machine to Kill')	Also known as La Poupée Sanglante (The Bloody Doll). Appeared first as a serial in the newspaper Le Matin. The lead character, Bénédict Masson, is wrongly accused of murder and guillotined. His brain is later attached to an automaton created by scientist Jacques Cotentin, and Masson goes on to track and punish those who caused his death. Technically he is a cyborg. In 1976 it was turned into a 6 episode French language TV miniseries.
Novel	1925	Unnamed	Maurice Renard and Albert Jean	Le Singe ('The Monkey')	Imagines the creation of artificial lifeforms through the process of "radiogenesis", a sort of human electrocopying or cloning process.
Short story	1926	Metal giants	Edmond Hamilton	The Metal Giants	A computer brain that runs on atomic power creates an army of 300-foot-tall robots.
Novel	1925	Maria (robot double)	Thea von Harbou	Metropolis	Adapted by Fritz Lang on film, featuring character Maria and her robot double.
Short Story	1928		David H. Keller	Revolt of the Pedestrians	
Short story	1929	Unnamed	S. Fowler Wright	Automata	About machines doing the humans' jobs before wiping them out.
Short Stories	1931–1958	Zoromes	Neil R. Jones	The Planet of the Double Sun, The Sunless World, Space War, Twin Worlds and Doomsday on Ajiat	Featured human and alien minds preserved in robot bodies. It was reprinted in five Ace paperbacks in the late 1960s.
Short Story	1932	Zat	John Wyndham	The Lost Machine	Martian robot protagonist.
Short Story	1934	Rex	Harl Vincent	Rex	Robot surgeon.
Short Story	1934	Helen O'Loy	Lester del Rey	Helen O'Loy	
Short Story	1938	Unnamed	Robert Moore Williams	The Robots Returm	Robots discover their "roots".
Short Story	1939–1942	Adam Link	Eando Binder	I, Robot	
Short Story	1940	Unnamed	F. Orlin Tremaine	True Confession	Robot as a murder witness.
Novelette	1940	Gnut	Harry Bates	Farewell to the Master	Later made into the classic 1951 science fiction film The Day the Earth Stood Still
Short Stories	1940–1950	Robbie, Speedy, Cutie, and others	Isaac Asimov	I, Robot	A series of stories written between 1940–1950. Developed the Three laws of robotics.
Short Story	1941	Jay Score ("J20"),	Eric Frank Russell		Emergency pilot of the Earth-to-Venus freighter Upskadaska City, (colloquially called "Upsydaisy". Appeared in the May 1941 issue of Astounding Science Fiction
Short story	1944	Jenkins	Clifford D. Simak	City	
Children's Novel	1946	Alojzy Kukuryk	Jan Brzechwa	Akademia pana Kleksa ('The Academy of Mr. Kleks')	A mischievous mechanical doll able to pass as a human boy, and the main adversary of the protagonist, Mr Blot.
Novelette	1947	The Humanoids	Jack Williamson	The Humanoids	And two subsequent novels (1949 and 1980).
Short story collection	1952	Jenkins	Clifford D. Simak	City	Robot who served generations of the Webster family.
Manga Series	1952	Astro Boy	Osamu Tezuka	Astro Boy	Astro Boy is an atomic-powered robot of 100,000 horsepower built to resemble Tobio, the deceased son of his creator Dr. Tenma. When not in school, Astro Boy spent his time dealing with robots and aliens.
Short Story Collection	1952	Various	Lewis Padgett (Henry Kuttner and C. L. Moore)	Robots Have No Tails	Gallegher series of stories.
Novel	1953	The Mechanical Hound	Ray Bradbury	Fahrenheit 451	
Novelette	1954	Bors	Philip K. Dick	The Last of the Masters	An old government integration robot pivotal to the story.
Novel	1954	R. Daneel Olivaw	Isaac Asimov	The Caves of Steel and subsequent novels	
Short story	1955	The Fury	Henry Kuttner	Two Handed Engine	A large steel robot that acts as jailer and executioner.
Short Story	1959	Zane Gort	Fritz Leiber	The Silver Eggheads	A robot novelist.
Novel	1963	SHROUD	Thomas Pynchon	V.	Synthetic Human, Radiation OUtput Determined) and (Synthetic Human Object, Casualty Kinematics), sentient test dummies,
Short Stores	1965	L-76, Z-1, Z-2, Z-3, Emma-2, Brackenridge, Tony, Lenny, Ez-27 and others	Isaac Asimov	The Rest of the Robots	
Short Story	1966	Frost, the Beta-Machine, Mordel, and the Ancient Ore Crusher	Roger Zelazny	For a Breath I Tarry	
Short Story Collection	1967	Trurl and Klapaucius	Stanisław Lem	The Cyberiad	Robot geniuses. Translated by Michael Kandel 1974. Humorous collection of short stories about the exploits of Trurl and Klapaucius, "constructors" among robots
Novel	1967	Mech Eagles	William F. Nolan & George Clayton Johnson	Logan's Run	Robotic eagles designed to track and kill people who refuse to die at age 21.
Novel	1968	The Iron Man	Ted Hughes	The Iron Man: A Children's Story in Five Nights	Illustrated by Andrew Davidson. Later changed to The Iron Giant to avoid confusion with its predecessor, the Marvel comic superhero of the same name.
Novel	1968	Roy Batty, Pris, Rachael and several other Nexus-6 model androids	Philip K. Dick	Do Androids Dream of Electric Sheep?	"Androids, fully organic in nature – the products of genetic engineering – and so human-like that they can only be distinguished by psychological tests; some of them don't even know that they're not human."
Novel	1968	Richard Daniel	Clifford D. Simak	All the Traps of Earth	An intensely loyal, old, un-remodeled robot, belonging to one family for generations. When the last of his entire extended family of owners died, after 200 years, he is required by law to be disassembled; humans who made the law are still threatened by robots who are superior to them in functionality. He is sentient enough to take exception to that policy.
Short Story	1969	The Electric Grandmother	Ray Bradbury	"I Sing the Body Electric"	Derived from a 1962 Twilight Zone episode of the same title also written by Bradbury, published in McCall's in 1969 as "The Beautiful One Is Here" and later that year as "I Sing the Body Electric" in the short story collection of the same name. Also adapted as the 1982 television film, The Electric Grandmother.
Novel	1972		Ira Levin	The Stepford Wives	"The masculine plot to replace women with perfect looking, obedient robot replicas."
Short Stories	1973	Setaur, Aniel and Terminus	Stanisław Lem		
Novella	1975	The Hangman	Roger Zelazny	Home Is the Hangman	1975 winner Nebula Award for Best Novella.
Novellette	1976	Andrew Martin	Isaac Asimov	The Bicentennial Man	Later made into a 1990 film.
Novels	1976	Droids		Star Wars franchise novels	Since 1977 for the main canon, 1976 for the Expanded Universe.
Novels	1979	Marvin the Paranoid Android	Douglas Adams	The Hitchhiker's Guide to the Galaxy	And subsequent novels based on the original radio series.
Novel	1980	Spofforth	Walter Tevis	Mockingbird	The dean of New York University.
Novel	1980	Roderick	John Sladek	Roderick	An example of robot morality, one who is perfectly innocent.
Novels	1980–1982	Sheen	Piers Anthony	Apprentice Adept series	A female android mysteriously programmed to guard and love Stile, a serf on the planet Proton.
Novels	1982–2000	Boppers	Rudy Rucker	Ware Tetralogy	A race of Moon-based robots that achieve independence from humanity.
Novel	1983	Tik Tok	John Sladek	Tik-Tok	An example of robot morality, one who is perfectly evil.
Novel	1983	R. Giskard Reventlov	Isaac Asimov	The Robots of Dawn	And in subsequent novels/
Children's novels	1983–1997	Norby	Janet Asimov	Norby, the Mixed-Up Robot and others.	With editorial assistance from her husband Isaac Asimov
Novels	1985–1986	CHIP	Seth McEvoy	Not Quite Human series	The robot teenage
Children's Novel	1987	Elio	Diana Wynne Jones	A Tale of Time City	
Children's Novel	1987	Manders	Alison Prince	The Type One Super Robot	
Novel	1989	Solo	Robert Mason	Weapon	Basis for the 1996 film titled Solo.
Novel	1991	Yod	Marge Piercy	He, She and It	
Novel	1991	The One Who Waits	Charles Sheffield	Divergence	
Novel	1992	Andrew Martin	Isaac Asimov and Robert Silverberg	The Positronic Man	
Novel	1993	Solo and Nimrod	Robert Mason	Solo	
Novels	1993–1996	Caliban	Roger MacBride Allen	Isaac Asimov's Caliban (1993); Isaac Asimov's Inferno (1994); Isaac Asimov's Utopia (1996)	Set in the robots universe of Isaac Asimov
Novel	1996	Jay-Dub and Dee Model	Ken MacLeod	The Stone Canal	
Novel	1997	Dorfl, and other Discworld golems	Terry Pratchett	Feet of Clay	Deliberately described in terms reminiscent of an Asimovian robot. Also appears in later Discworld novels.
Novels	2001–2015	Casandra Kresnov	Joel Shepherd	Crossover and other novels	
Novel	2003	Moravecs	Dan Simmons	Ilium	Sentient descendants of probes sent by humans to the Jovian belt.
Novel series	2004	Clunk	Simon Haynes		
Novel Series	2007	Nimue Alban/Merlin Athrawes	David Weber	Safehold series	
Novel	2007	Otis	Tanith Lee	Indigara	Robot dog.
Novel series	2008–2012	Engimals	Oisin McGann	Wildenstern Saga series	A race of animal-like robots.
Novel	2008	Freya	Charles Stross	Saturn's Children	
Novel	2008	HCR-328 and Tom	Ariadne Tampion	Automatic Lover and Automatic Lover – Ten Years On	
Novel (illustrated)	2009	Boilerplate	Paul Guinan	Boilerplate	A Victorian-era robot in an illustrated coffee-table book published by Abrams.
Novel	2014	Automaton		The Automation	Titular character made by the Greco-Roman god Vulcan.
Novel	2019	Adam	Ian McEwan	Machines Like Me	One of the first commercially available androids.
Novella	2019	Calculators	Paul Levinson	Robinson Calculator	An ancient, ongoing family of androids.
Novel	2021	Artificial Friend	Kazuo Ishiguro	Klara and the Sun	"Artificial Friend" and book's narrator.
Novel	2023	Neotnia	Michael Grothaus	Beautiful Shining People	Co-protagonist
Novel	2023	Crimson		The Mystery at Crimson Mansion	A robot butler hunting the main characters and is the main antagonist.

== Radio ==
- Marvin the Paranoid Android in The Hitchhiker's Guide to the Galaxy BBC radio series (1978–1980)
- Tidy, George, Fagor, Surgeon General Kraken and miscellaneous other androids from James Follett's Earthsearch BBC radio series (1980–1981)
- Fetchers, accident prone and apologetic gopher robots from the BBC radio series Nineteen Ninety-Four (1985)

== Music ==
- Olympia, mechanical doll in Act I of Jacques Offenbach's The Tales of Hoffmann, based on the Hoffmann story (1881)
- "Max Mainspring, the Mechanical Man", a former grandfather clock brought to life in a 1950 children's record by Ray Bolger.
- "Robot Man", subject of a 1960 single by Connie Francis
- "Automatic Lover", robot featured in a 1978 disco track and music video by Dee D. Jackson, covered later that year by Sylvia.
- The Martian tripodal Killing Machines with heat rays in Jeff Wayne's Musical Version of the War of the Worlds (1978).
- Marvin, the Paranoid Android, released two singles in 1981, voiced by Stephen Moore from the BBC radio and TV productions of The Hitchhiker's Guide to the Galaxy.
- "Rock 'n' Roll Robot", 1981 single by Alberto Camerini
- "Automatic Man", titular character of the 1983 song by Michael Sembello.
- "Mr. Roboto", the prison robot in the eponymous song from the rock opera Kilroy Was Here by Styx (1983).
- Topo, robot mascot of Topo & Roby, an Italo disco act, which charted in Europe in 1984 with "Under the Ice".
- "Electric Barbarella", a sexbot appearing in the music video for the 1997 track by Duran Duran.
- Pink Robots battled in The Flaming Lips' Yoshimi Battles the Pink Robots and its title single (2002).
- "Rapbot", a robot built for rapping, but with various other functions, including a toaster, from Fake Songs by Liam Lynch (2003).
- "Half Man Half Machine" from Goldie Lookin' Chain's 2004 single.
- Cindi Mayweather, the protagonist from the "Metropolis" concept series by Janelle Monáe (2007).
- Cyborg Noodle, the cyborg clone of Noodle from the virtual band Gorillaz who was created for the storyline of their album Plastic Beach (2010).
- "Selfmachine", titular character from the opening track of I Blame Coco's 2010 album The Constant.
- Rovix, K-pop group VIXX's robotic mascot (2012).
- Volpetron, a gigantic robot persona based on a DJ and music producer Ray Volpe, who made its debut from the album "FOREVER, VOLPETRON".

== Film ==
Medium	Year	Name	Appears In	Notes
Film	1917	The Mechanical Dummy	A Clever Dummy	Ben Turpin comedy. The term "robot" did not yet exist. The dummy does not operate independently but performs limited movements when wired to a control box.
Film Serial	1918	The Automaton	The Master Mystery	Serial film starring Harry Houdini. The last episode reveals the Automaton to have been a man in a metal suit.
Film	1921	The Mechanical Man	The Mechanical Man	One of two robots from the Italian silent film directed by André Deed.
Cartoon	1922	The Mechanical Horse	Aesop's Fables short The Mechanical Horse	Animated film considered lost.
Film	1927	Maschinenmensch a.k.a. "false Maria"	Metropolis	A robotic gynoid, modeled after character Maria, both played by German actress Brigitte Helm. Directed by Fritz Lang.
Cartoon	1927	The Mechanical Cow	The Mechanical Cow	Cartoon companion of Oswald the Lucky Rabbit.
Cartoon	1930	The Iron Man	Aesop's Fables short The Iron Man	A robot man delivered to Farmer Al Falfa.
Cartoon	1931	Mechanical Racehorse	Ups 'n Downs	Built by the Looney Tunes series character Bosko to win a race at a fair.
Cartoon	1932	Mechanical Man	Mechanical Man	A robot opponent of Oswald the Lucky Rabbit
Cartoon	1932	The Robot	Talkartoons short The Robot	Constructed from an automobile by Bimbo to win a boxing match.
Cartoon	1933	Bosco's Mechanical Man	Bosco's Mechanical Man	A robot constructed by Bosko to perform household chores.
Cartoon	1933	Mechanical Farm Hands	Technoracket	Scrappy cartoon. Robots designed to perform farm chores.
Cartoon	1933	The Mechanical Man	Techno-Cracked	A robot built by Flip the Frog to perform chores.
Cartoon	1933	Mickey's Mechanical Man	Mickey's Mechanical Man	A robot boxer invented by Mickey Mouse.
Film Serial	1934	The Juggernaut	The Vanishing Shadow	A 7-foot-tall (2.1 m) robot programmed to be an assassin.
Film	1934	Arbeitsmaschine and Kampfmaschin	Der Herr der Welt	Directed by Harry Piel. A mad scientist Professor Wolf (Walter Franck) is eventually killed by his fighting robot.
Cartoon	1935	Black Beauty	Happy Harmonies short The Old Plantation	A mechanical racehorse.
Film Serial	1935	Muranian Robots	The Phantom Empire	A 12-chapter Mascot Pictures serial combining the Western, musical and fantasy genres.
Film Short	1935	The Tin Man	The Tin Man	Voiced by Billy Bletcher ("My name is robot!") from the Roach comedy short featuring Thelma Todd and Patsy Kelly
Film Serial	1936	Annihilants	Flash Gordon	Robot soldiers belonging to Ming the Merciless
Film Serial	1936, 1966	Volkites	Undersea Kingdom, later edited into feature Sharad of Atlantis	Robotic henchmen of the Atlantean tyrant Unga Khan. First appearance of the Republic Pictures serials robot.
Cartoon	1937	The Mechanical Cow	Terrytoons short The Mechanical Cow	Invented by Farmer Al Falfa after his dairy cows go on strike.
Cartoon	1937	The Mechanical Handy Man	The Mechanical Handy Man	A rooster-like robot designed by Oswald the Lucky Rabbit to perform chores.
Cartoon	1937	Robot butler and other robots	Modern Inventions	Foils confounding Donald Duck.
Cartoon	1938	The New 1938 Creamlined Cow	Looney Tunes short "Porky's Poppa"	A mechanical dairy cow.
Cartoon	1938	Robot auto mechanics	The Auto Clinic	A Krazy Kat short.
Cartoon	1938	World's Fair robots	All's Fair at the Fair	Promotion film for the 1938 World's fair.
Film Serial	1939	Iron man	The Phantom Creeps	An 8-foot-tall (2.4 m) robot created by Dr. Alex Zorka
Cartoon	1939	Robot sweeper and other robots	Looney Tunes short Dog Gone Modern	Set in an "all electric model home".
Cartoon	1940	Man of Tin	Man of Tin	A robotic wrestler invented by Scrappy and a mad scientist.
Film Serial	1940, 1966	Steel "Killer" Robot	Mysterious Doctor Satan (a.k.a. Doctor Satan's Robot)	Director William Witney's early 1940s film serial. 15 episodes. Re-edited into a feature in 1966. Second appearance of the Republic Pictures serials robot.
Cartoon	1941	Mechanical Monsters	The Mechanical Monsters	A Superman animated short.
Film Serial	1945	Metalagon Man	The Monster and the Ape	A stolen robot.
Film	1951	Gort	The Day the Earth Stood Still	Loosely based on Gnut, the robot protagonist of "Farewell to the Master" by Harry Bates
Film	1952	Mark 1	Mother Riley Meets the Vampire	
Film Serial	1952, 1958	Martian robot	Zombies of the Stratosphere, later edited into feature Satan's Satellites	Third appearance of the Republic Pictures serials robot.
Cartoon	1952	Mechano	Tom and Jerry short Push-Button Kitty	Robotic cat programmed to kill or banish mice from houses.
Film	1952	Ro-Man Extension XJ-2	Robot Monster	A gorilla-bodied alien robot bent on destroying Earth.
Cartoon	1953	Robot Pest Control	Looney Tunes short Robot Rabbit	Purchased by Elmer Fudd to catch Bugs Bunny
Film	1953	Twonky	The Twonky	
Film	1954	Gog and Magog	Gog	
Film	1954	Chani	Devil Girl from Mars	Nyah's robot.
Film	1954	Tobor	Tobor the Great	Robot created to replace astronauts in space.
Film	1954	Venusian robots	Target Earth	Robots who invade Earth.
Film	1956	Robby the Robot	Forbidden Planet	
Film	1957	Kronos	Kronos	
Film	1957	Moguera	The Mysterians	Large, mole-like robot in this and several subsequent Japanese films.
Film	1958	Colossus	The Colossus of New York	
Film	1958	The Human Robot	The Robot vs. The Aztec Mummy	
Film	1960	Omega	First Spaceship on Venus	
Cartoon	1960	Robot ZX29B, the Demolition Squad, and others	Merrie Melodies short Lighter Than Hare	Robots sent by "Yosemite Sam of Outer Space" to capture Bugs Bunny.
Film	1961	Neptune Men	Invasion of the Neptune Men	Robotic aliens. Stars a young Sonny Chiba.
Films	1962, 1965, 1968	Robot John	Planet of Storms/Voyage to the Prehistoric Planet/Voyage to the Planet of Prehistoric Women	
Film	1962	The Humanoids (Clickers)	The Creation of the Humanoids	
Film	1964	Alien robots	The Earth Dies Screaming	Invaders of Earth.
Film	1964	Torg	Santa Claus Conquers the Martians	
Film	1965	Frank Saunders	Frankenstein Meets the Space Monster	An android version of Frankenstein's monster.
Film	1965, 1966	Sexbots/Fembots including Robot #1 (Diane)	Dr. Goldfoot and the Bikini Dr. Goldfoot and the Girl Bombs	Both starring Vincent Price.
Film	1966	Cyborg Garth A7	Cyborg 2087	
Film	1967	Arlington Hewes and "The Phone Company Executives"	The President's Analyst	Animatronic robots bent on world domination.
Film	1967	Robot operator	The Terrornauts	
Film	1967	Mechani-Kong	King Kong Escapes	
Film	1967	Robot world leaders	Casino Royale	Created by Jimmy Bond (Woody Allen) to control the world in the (1967) spoof of the James Bond franchise.
Film	1968	Robot army	Superargo and the Faceless Giants	
Film	1970	All robot police force	THX 1138	
Film	1972	Huey, Dewey and Louie	Silent Running	Notable as the first movie in which non-humanoid robots (drones) were made mobile by manning them with amputees.
Film	1973	Jet Jaguar	Godzilla vs. Megalon	
Film	1973 and 1976	The Gunslinger (and other androids)	Westworld and Futureworld	"The Gunslinger" was played by Yul Brynner.
Film	1973	Butler robots, tailor robots, evil computer	Sleeper	
Film	1974	Mechagodzilla	Godzilla vs. Mechagodzilla	+ various successor films
Film	1974	Rapebots	Flesh Gordon	
Film	1976	various	The Stepford Wives	Joanna Eberhart and other women are being replaced with identical robots.
Film	1976	Box	Logan's Run	
Animated Film	1977	Necron-99 (later called "Peace")	Wizards	Film by Ralph Bakshi.
Film	1977	Proteus IV	Demon Seed	An AI computer developed by Alex Harris, that eventually rapes the scientist's wife to be immortal.
Film	1977	C-3PO, R2-D2 and other droids	Star Wars franchise	
Film	1977	Robot Overlord	Cosmos: War of the Planets	Italian production.
Film	1978	Alien robot army	Starship Invasions	Alien robots threaten Earth.
Film	1978	Beba-2	Message from Space	
Film	1978	Elle and the Giant Robot	Starcrash	
Film	1979	Sparks, Lomax, others	H. G. Wells' The Shape of Things to Come	Canadian film
Film	1979	Ash	Alien	
Film	1979	Hermes	Unidentified Flying Oddball	An android double of his creator.
Film	1979	C.H.O.M.P.S	C.H.O.M.P.S.	Canine HOMe Protection System), a robotic dog invented by his young owner.
Film	1979	Tilk, Tilly and others	Star Odyssey	Italian Film
Film	1979	Ilia probe	Star Trek: The Motion Picture	A gynoid double of the original Ilia.
Film	1979	V.I.N.CENT, B.O.B., Maximillian	The Black Hole	+ other androids made out of humans.
Film	1980	Hector	Saturn 3	
Film	1980	Galaxina	Galaxina	Dorothy Stratten portrayed the title role.
Film	1980	Giant Robot	The King and the Mockingbird	The 1952 version provides one of the earliest uses of the Giant Robot/Mecha in animation.
Film	1981	Bubo	Clash of the Titans	A mechanical owl.
Film	1981	robot	Heavy Metal	Appears in segment 'So Beautiful, So Dangerous'.
Film	1981	Val, Aqua, Phil and others	Heartbeeps	
Film	1982	Replicants, including Roy Batty, Pris, Leon Kowalski, Zhora, Rachael, and possibly Rick Deckard	Blade Runner	The film version of Do Androids Dream of Electric Sheep?
Film	1982	Recognizers	Tron	Police robots
Film	1982	Max 404 and Cassandra One	Android	
Film	1982	Various androids	Halloween III: Season of the Witch	Conal Cochran's androids who serve central antagonists/villains in this non-Halloween consecutive film.
Film	1984	Beta	The Last Starfighter	An android left on Earth impersonating Alex Rogan while he is in space.
Film	1984	T-800	The Terminator	Titular robot assassin.
Film	1984	Robot spiders + various others	Runaway	Robots maliciously reprogrammed to kill.
Film	1985	D.A.R.Y.L.	D.A.R.Y.L.	Data Analyzing Robot Youth Lifeform, a robot built to the government to look like a ten-year-old boy.
Film	1985	Tik-Tok	Return to Oz	
Film	1985	Sico	Rocky IV	Paulie's robot
Film	1986	Spot	Eliminators	
Film	1986	Killbots	Chopping Mall	
Film	1986 1987 1990	Johnny 5	Short Circuit/Short Circuit 2/Hot Cars, Cold Facts	+ other S-A-I-N-T (Strategic-Artificially-Intelligent-Nuclear-Transport) military robots.
Film	1986	Jinx	SpaceCamp	
Film	1986	Bishop	Aliens	
Film	1986	R.A.L.F. and MAX	Flight of the Navigator	Robotic Assistant Labor Facilitator and the TriMAXion Drone Ship.
Film	1986	BB and Samantha	Deadly Friend	
Film	1987	Ulyssses	Making Mr. Right	An android.
Film	1987	Chip	Not Quite Human	Movie adaptions based on the books by Seth McEvoy.
Animated Filme	1987	Janice Em	Robotech II: The Sentinels	A "sexy robot" with an "android body." JANICE is an acronym (according to the voice actress Chase Masterson in the video: The Face behind the Voice mini-documentary) which means: Junctioned Artificial Neuro-Integrated Cybernetic Entity.)
Film	1987	Dot Matrix	Spaceballs	
Animated film series	1987–1997	Toaster and Kirby	The Brave Little Toaster	
Film	1987	ED-209	RoboCop	
Film	1987	R.O.T.O.R.	R.O.T.O.R.	Eponymous main antagonist of the movie.
Film	1987	The "fix-its"	Batteries Not Included	
Film	1988	Cherry 2000	Cherry 2000	Pamela Gidley plays the title role.
Film	1989	Byron	Slipstream	With Mark Hamill, Bill Paxton, and Bob Peck as Byron
Film	1990	Quinn and DV-8	Crash and Burn	
Film	1990	MARK13	Hardware	
Film	1990	Enforcer Drone	Spaced Invaders	
Film	1990	Johnny Cab	Total Recall	
Film	1991	Pino Petto	Silent Night, Deadly Night 5: The Toy Maker	
Film	1991	T-800 and T-1000	Terminator 2: Judgment Day	Model Terminators played respectively by Arnold Schwarzenegger and Robert Patrick.
Film	1991	Robotic doubles	Bill & Ted's Bogus Journey	Good and evil robotic doubles of Bill and Ted.
Film	1991	Newman	And You Thought Your Parents Were Weird	
Film	1991	Eve	Eve of Destruction	
Film	1991	Mecha-King Ghidorah	Godzilla vs. King Ghidorah	A cyborg.
Film	1992–1993	Mr. Static	Demonic Toys	A demonic toy robot.
Film	1992	Alsatia Zevo	Toys	The gynoid sister of Leslie Zevo and doll maker.
Film	1992	Bishop	Alien 3	
Film	1993	Android ninjas	RoboCop 3	
Film	1994–2002	Data	Star Trek: The Next Generation movies	Continuation of the character from the TV series.
Film	1994	Sterilization Units	A.P.E.X.	
Animated short	1994	Techno Trousers	Wallace & Gromit in The Wrong Trousers	
Film	1995	"SID 6.7"	Virtuosity	A nanotech synthetic android villain, played by Russell Crowe.
Film	1995	David, Becker and Jessica	Screamers	Based on the short story "Second Variety" by Philip K. Dick.
Animated Film	1995	Project 2501	Ghost in the Shell	Japanese manga anime describes AI surveillance of the population.
Film	1995	Evolver	Evolver	Eponymous villain from the film.
Film	1996	Solo	Solo	Based on Robert Mason's 1989 novel Weapon
Film	1997	Call	Alien Resurrection	
Film	1997–2002	Fembot assassins	Austin Powers series	In Austin Powers: The Spy Who Shagged Me (1999), it is revealed that Vanessa Kensington is a fembot, and in Austin Powers in Goldmember (2002), Britney Spears plays herself as one.
Film	1997	Weebo	Flubber	
Film	1999	Astor	Gangster World	An android played by Stacey Williams.
Animated Film	1999	The Iron Giant	The Iron Giant	aA film version of the Ted Hughes children's novel The Iron Man.
Film	1999	Andrew	The Bicentennial Man	Played by Robin Williams and others, the robot servant and main character. Based on a short story by Isaac Asimov
Film	1999–2003	Sentinels	Matrix series	
Film series	1999–2005	Battle Droids	Star Wars: Episode I – The Phantom Menace to Star Wars: Episode III – Revenge of the Sith	
Film	1999	RoboGadget	Inspector Gadget	
Film	2000	AMEE	Red Planet	Acronym for: Autonomous Mapping Exploration and Evasion. Robot scout in the film who gets stuck in military mode and destroys the human crew of the spaceship.
Animated Film	2001	Goddard	Jimmy Neutron: Boy Genius	Jimmy Neutron's robot pet dog.
Anime Film	2001	Tima	Metropolis	A female android robot.
Film	2001	SIMON	Lara Croft: Tomb Raider	
Film	2001	David + many others	A.I. Artificial Intelligence	Based on the "Supertoys" of Brian Aldiss' short story "Supertoys Last All Summer Long".
Film	2002	Kay-Em 14	Jason X	Female android in the tenth installment of the Friday the 13th franchise.
Film	2002	Syder robots	Minority Report	Used by the PreCrime police force to locate and identify "perpetrators".
Film	2002	Bruno	The Adventures of Pluto Nash	
Film	2002	S1MONE	S1M0NE	Name derived from SIMulation ONE. Title character played by Rachel Roberts and starring Al Pacino.
Animated Film	2002	Bio-Electronic Navigator a.k.a. B.E.N.	Treasure Planet	An absent-minded robot.
Film	2002	B-4	Star Trek: Nemesis	Data's and Lore's older brother.
Film	2002	US 47	Hollywood	Indian film spoken in the Kannada language.
Film	2002	R.A.L.F	Spy Kids 2: The Island of Lost Dreams	
Film	2002, 2005	R4-P17 and the Droid Army	Star Wars: Episode II – Attack of the Clones Star Wars: Episode III – Revenge of the Sith	
Film	2003	T-850 Terminator T-X Terminatrix	Terminator 3: Rise of the Machines	Portrayed by Arnold Schwarzenegger and Kristanna Loken.
Film	2003	G2	Inspector Gadget 2	
Film Shorts	2003	B166ER	The Second Renaissance Part I and The Second Renaissance Part II	The robot butler and the residents of the machine nation of Zero-One rom The Animatrix.
Film	2003	RIA + other "dolls"	Natural City	
Film	2004	Sonny+ NS4	I, Robot	
Film	2004	Omnidroid	The Incredibles	A series of intelligent and destructive robots developed by Syndrome to fight and kill "Supers"
Film	2004	Unnamed	Rottweiler	A monstrous robot dog
Animated Film	2004	Mata Nui + the Vahki	Bionicle 2: Legends of Metru Nui	The great spirit Mata Nui, god robot from the Bionicle franchise; and the Vahki, the robot police enforcers
Film	2004	Unnamed	Sky Captain and the World of Tomorrow	The Totenkopf Gatekeeper Robot, Totenkopf Guard Robots, unnamed giant robots and flying robots.
Film	2004	The Loch Ness Monster	Scooby-Doo! and the Loch Ness Monster	
Film	2005	Unnamed robot	Zathura: A Space Adventure	
Film	2005	Marvin the Paranoid Android	The Hitchhiker's Guide to the Galaxy	
Film	2005	EDI	Stealth	Acronym for Extrem Deep Invader.
Film	2007	Transmorphers	Transmorphers	Title characters. Direct-to-DVD film
Animated Film	2007	DOR-15 and Carl	Meet the Robinsons	
Animated Film	2007	Billybot and Mandroid	Billy and Mandy's Big Boogey Adventure	Produced by the 2007 Cartoon Network.
Film	2007	Giddy	Battle for Terra	
Film	2008	MD 63 (RoboDoc)	RoboDoc	National Lampoon film with the same name as the titular character.
Animated Film	2008	WALL-E, EVE, AUTO + others	WALL-E	
Animated Short	2008	WALL-E + others	BURN-E	Includes EVE, M-O, VAQ-M, VN-GO, GO-4, PR-T, D-FIB, BURN-E, HAN-S, BRL-A, and all other robot characters from the 2008 film WALL-E
Film	2008	The Golden Army	Hellboy II: The Golden Army	A Robot horde
Animated Film	2008	Robot ninjas	Scooby-Doo! and the Samurai Sword	
Animated Film	2009	robotic probes	Monsters vs. Aliens	
Animated Film	2009	Astro Boy + other robots	Astro Boy	Astro Boy is an android who was created to replace his creator's deceased son Tobio and was given Tobio's memories. Throughout the film, he encounters other robots, who were created to assist humans.
Film	2009	Various	Terminator Salvation	Includes Marcus Wright, the T-800, several T-600's, The Motor-Terminators and The Harvester
Film	2009	Eyeborgs	Eyeborgs	
Film	2009	GERTY 3000	Moon	
Animated Film	2009	Stitchpunks + others	9	
Animated Film	2009	Robo	Super Capers	
Animated Film	2010	Brainbots	Megamind	Megamind's robotic jellyfish assistants.
Animated Film	2010	Automaton use civil	Mobile Suit Gundam 00: A wakening of the Trailblazer	unmanned, autonomous machines.
Film	2010	Chitti	Enthiran	A humanoid robot played by Rajinikanth, built to obey the three laws of Asimov, turns evil.
Film	2010	Paws	Cats & Dogs: The Revenge of Kitty Galore	Kitty Galore's robotic Maine Coon.
Film	2011	Candy Droober, Franklin Droober, Maureen Droober and Trace Mayter	Android Re-Enactment	
Film	2011	Max, Gris, SI-9	Eva	Max, a robotic butler played by Lluís Homar, Gris, a free-thinking robotic cat, tiny robot horses and SI-9 .
Film	2011	'80s Robot	The Muppets	
Animated Film	2011	Robot 7	All-Star Superman	
Animated Film	2011	Phatasaur	Scooby-Doo! Legend of the Phantosaur	
Films	2012, 2017	David 8 and Walter One	Prometheus (2012) and Alien: Covenant (2017)	Androids played by Michael Fassbender.
Film	2013	Tet	Oblivion	A tetrahedron in Earth's orbit that enslaved the human population, and cloned workers to maintain drones that keep humans from using the generators.
Film	2013	MecWilly	Regalo a sopresa	Italian film. Appears in the pub scene
Film	2013	Jaegers	Pacific Rim	Man-made, 250-ft war machines built to fight giant monsters called kaiju, who emerge from a portal in the Pacific Ocean to attack humanity.
Film	2014	Dr. Wallace Damon	The Signal	Chief of a research group of investigation about UFOs.
Animated Film	2014	Sheriff Not-a-Robot	The Lego Movie	A robotic sheriff from the Old West and the Micro Managers, Lord Business' henchmen.
Animated Film	2014	Baymax	Big Hero 6	An inflatable healthcare companion robot.
Film	2014	TARS and CASE	Interstellar	Adaptable rectangle robots.
Film	2015	Ultron, Vision	Avengers: Age of Ultron	An evil robot portrayed by James Spader and the Vision, an android portrayed by Paul Bettany respectively.
Film	2015	Ava and Kyoko	Ex Machina	Androids.
Film	2015	Athena	Tomorrowland	Audio-animatronic droid recruiter.
Film	2015	Intergalactic Advocate Bob	Jupiter Ascending	The assistance android that guides Jupiter Jones through the bureaucratic process.
Film	2015	T-800	Terminator Genisys	The robot protector.
Film	2015	CHAPPiE	CHAPPiE	The first robot with the ability to think and feel for himself. Also MOOSE and the Scouts.
Animated Film	2015	Rob-Monkey, Gorilla Grodd's minions	Lego DC Comics Super Heroes: Justice League: Attack of the Legion of Doom	
Film	2015	BB-8	Star Wars: The Force Awakens	An astromech droid.
Film	2016	Arthur	Passengers	An android bartender portrayed by Michael Sheen.
Animated Film	2016	Kit, Okra, OX King, Victor and Wilmer	Bling	
Film	2016	K-2SO	Rogue One: A Star Wars Story	A Rebel-owned Imperial enforcer droid.
Film	2016	Morgan	Morgan	A female humanoid.
Film	2016	S.A.R.-003	Kill Command	During the battle, Mills discovers an advanced S.A.R. (Study Analyze Reprogram).
Film	2017	Bennie and Jet	Kingsman: The Golden Circle	Robot dogs.
Film	2017	K, Luv, Freysa, Sapper Morton and Mariette	Blade Runner 2049	Replicants.
Animated Film	2018	7723	Next Gen	
Film	2018	A.X.L.	A.X.L.	A robotic dog
Animated Film	2018	Cybots and the Robo-Clowns	Lego DC Comics Super Heroes: The Flash	Minions of the Joker.
Film	2018	Nimani	A.I. Rising	
Film	2018	L3-37	Solo: A Star Wars Story	Played by Phoebe Waller-Bridge.
Film	2019	Chucky	Child's Play	Killer robot doll.
Film	2019	T-800	Terminator: Dark Fate	The robot protector.
Film	2019	AUTO	Automation	
Animated Film	2020	Rottens	Scoob!	Dick Dastardly's minions.
Film	2021	Mechagodzilla	Godzilla vs. Kong	
Animated Film	2022	Sox	Lightyear	A robotic cat. Pixar film.
Animated Film	2022	Misery Company	Trick or Treat Scooby-Doo!	Group of robots made to resemble ghostly forms of Mystery Incorporated.
Film	2023	M3Gan	M3GAN	An android companion created for the main character of the film.
Animated Film	2024	ROZZUM unit 7134 ("Roz")	The Wild Robot	
Film	2026	Roboto	Masters of the Universe	

== Television films and series ==
Format	Year	Name	Appears In	Notes
TV Episode	1958	Robby the Robot	"Robot Client"	A robot accused of murder in an episode of The Thin Man
TV Episode	1963	Robot Simon (Robby the Robot)	"Uncle Simon"	Episode of The Twilight Zone
TV Episode	1963	"Robby the Robot"	The Brain Center at Whipple's	Episode of The Twilight Zone
TV Series	1962	Rosie the Maid, Mac, UniBlab	The Jetsons	
TV Episode	1962	robot maid (Robby the Robot)	"Rosie's Contract"	Episode of Hazel
TV Serial	1965	Mechonoids	The Chase	Doctor Who storyline
TV Serial	1965	Chumblies	Galaxy 4	Doctor Who storyline
Animated series	1963–1966	Astro Boy	Astro Boy	Japanese series
Animated series	1963–1966	Gigantor	Gigantor	Series about the giant titular robot.
TV Series	1965–1968	Hymie the Robot	Get Smart	Played by Dick Gautier who was reprogrammed for good, not evil.
TV Series	1965–1969	Robot B-9; Robotoid; Robot prison guard	Lost in Space	Robot B9 Class M-3 General Utility Non-Theorizing Environmental Control Robot assigned to the Jupiter 2. a.k.a. The Robot.; The Robotoid (Robby the Robot) appeared in the episode "War of the Robots" (1966); The robot prison guard appeared in the episode "Condemned of Space" (1967)
TV Episode	1966	Smiley the Robot (Robby the Robot)	Lurch's Little Helper	The Addams Family episode
TV series	1968–1970	Mildred the Maid	The Banana Splits Adventure Hour	
TV series		Slim John	Slim John	A rebel robot.
Cartoon episode	1968	Charlie	Foul Play in Funland	Episode in Scooby-Doo, Where Are You!
TV series	1970–1980	K9	Doctor Who	Appears in seasons 7-17. The Doctor's robot dog companion with encyclopaedic knowledge and vast computer intelligence, created by Professor Marius and introduced in the serial The Invisible Enemy (1977)
TV Series	1972	Kikaider + numerous other androids	Kikaider	Japanese superhero series
TV Episode	1974	MM7 (Robby the Robot)	Mind Over Mayhem	Columbo
TV Series	1976	Alfie the Robot (Robby the Robot)	The Robot	Ark II
TV Series	1977–1978	P.O.P.S. (Robot B-9 modified)	Mystery Island	
Anime Series	1979	Haro	Mobile Suit Gundam	
TV Series	1978–1979	Cylons	Battlestar Galactica	Mechanical men created by a race of reptile-like creatures. Lucifer, an IL series Cylon, the robot assistant to Count Baltar introduced in "Saga of a Star World – Part III" (1978)
TV Series	1979	Chuck the Robot (Robby the Robot)	Dr. Morkenstein	Episode of Mork & Mindy
TV Series	1982–1986	KARR, KITT	Knight Rider	Knight Automated Roving Robot; Knight Industries Two Thousand
Animated Series	1984–1986	Voltron	Voltron: Defender of the Universe	
Animated Series	1985	synthoids	G. I. Joe: A Real American Hero	
Animated Series	1986	B.A.T.s	G. I. Joe: A Real American Hero	
TV Series	1986–1991	Conky 2000	Pee-wee's Playhouse	Robot who gives out the secret word.
Animated Series	1985–1986	T-Bob	M.A.S.K.	A droid developed and owned by Scott Trakker closely resembling R2-D2.
TV Series	1987–1994	Data	Star Trek: The Next Generation	Lore, Lal (Data's daughter) and Juliana Tainer
TV Series	1988	Tom Servo, Crow T. Robot, Gypsy and Cambot	Mystery Science Theater 3000	Created by and friends to Joel Hodgson and later Mike Nelson.
TV Series	1988	Talkie Toaster, Kryten, the Skutters, the Simulants and many others	Red Dwarf	
TV Series	1993–1996, 1997	Alpha 5	Mighty Morphin Power Rangers, Power Rangers Turbo	
TV Series	1993	Scratch, Grounder and Coconuts	Adventures of Sonic the Hedgehog	Dr Robotnik's idiot henchmen.
TV Series	1993-	Megazords	Power Rangers franchise	Giant robots
Animated Series	1994–1997	Steel/Iron Clan, Coyote, and Coldfire/Coldstone	Gargoyles	
Anime Series	1995–1996	Evangelions or EVAs	Neon Genesis Evangelion	
TV Episodes	1995, 1998	Valerie 23 and Mary 25	The Outer Limits	
TV Series	1996,1998	Machine Empire Blue Senturion	Power Rangers Zeo to Power Rangers in Space	
Anime Series	1996–1999	Melfina	Outlaw Star	
TV Series	1997–2007	Alpha 6	Power Rangers Turbo to Power Rangers Lost Galaxy and Power Rangers Operation Overdrive	
TV Series	1997–2002	790	Lexx	A sarcastic and perverse bodyless robot head.
TV Series	1997–2003	Buffybot	Buffy the Vampire Slayer	A sexbot made by Warren Mears for Spike, appears in various episodes.
Animated Series	1999	Bender	Futurama	As well as Flexo, Robot Santa, Kwanzaa-Bot, Calculon, Robot Devil, Clamps and other assorted robots including the Epsilon Rho Rho fraternity robots.
TV Series	1999	Psycho Rangers	Power Rangers Lost Galaxy	
Animated series	1999, 2003–2009	Jenny Wakeman / XJ-9	My Life as a Teenage Robot	An android created by Nora Wakeman who defends Earth from evil while attempting to live a normal human life.
TV Series	1999–2009	Replicators	Stargate SG-1	Nanobots that could assemble in various configurations including human form.
Anime Series	1999–2025	Andromon and Guardromon	Digimon	
Animated series	2000	May, Sara, Rena, Kei, and Mami	Hand Maid May	
Animated Series Episodes	2001, 2002, ?, ?	Rabbot, Cybernetic Ghost of Christmas Past from the Future, Robositter and Sheila	Aqua Teen Hunger Force	Series ran from 2000–2015.
TV Series	2001	Frax and the Cyclobots	Power Rangers Time Force	
Animated Series	2001	GIR	Invader Zim	A dysfunctional robot who is assigned to serve Zim during his invasion of Earth.
TV Series	2001–2005	Rommie, Gabriel/Balance of Judgement, Pax Magelanic, Doyle + others	Gene Roddenberry's Andromeda	Warship AIs/avatars
Animated Seris	2001–2002	Zeta	The Zeta Project	An android created by the government for espionage and infiltration. Due to a module secretly implanted by his creator, Eli Selig, Zeta abandons his mission and becomes a fugitive from the government and the NSA.
Animated Series	2002	Alpha 7	Power Rangers Wild Force	
Anime Series	2002	Various	Daigunder	
Animated Series	2002–2003	Robot Jones	Whatever Happened to... Robot Jones?	A robot who attends a human school in an attempt to understand humanity.
Animated Series	2002–2006	Snow Creature in There's No Creature Like Snow Creature (2002); Dinosaur Spirit in 3-D Struction (2002); Motoshondu in She Sees Sea Monsters by the Sea Shore (2002); Headless Snowman in A Scooby-Doo! Christmas (2002); 30 Foot Shaggy in Big Appetite in Little Tokyo (2003); Jeeves in High-Tech House of Horrors (2003); Scarecrow Robots in A Scooby-Doo Halloween (2003); The robots of Cyber Gulch in Go West, Young Scoob (2005); Menacing Metallic Clown in A Terrifying Round with a Menacing Metallic Clown (2005); Skeleton Driver in Gentlemen, Start Your Monsters!	What's New, Scooby-Doo?	
Anime Series	2003	Chii	Chobits	The Persocom in the Japanese anime series.
Anime Series	2003	Docoe, Bocoe and Bokkun	Sonic X	Doctor Eggman's robotic henchmen.
Anime Series	2003	Canti	FLCL	One of the robots built by Medical Mechanica.
Anime Series	2003	R. Dorothy Wayneright	The Big O	
Animated Series	2003–2009	Karaibots	Teenage Mutant Ninja Turtles	
Animated Series	2003–2018	H.E.L.P.eR., G.U.A.R.D.O. and Huggy	The Venture Bros.	(Humanoid Electric Lab Partner Rboot) A direct to video film Radiant Is the Blood of the Baboon Heart was released in 2023.
Anime Series	2004–2005	The Tachikoma	Ghost in the Shell: Stand Alone Complex	Spider tanks.
Animated Series	2004–2005	C.A.R.R.	Stroker and Hoop	
Animated Series	2004	D.A.V.E.	The Batman	Digitally Advanced Villain Emulator. A robot created by Hugo Strange that possesses the knowledge of various villains.
TV Series	2004	Cylons	Battlestar Galactica	Centurions; Hybrids; Number One (John Cavil); Number Two (Leoben Conoy); Number Three (D'anna Biers); Number Four (Simon); Number Five (Aaron Doral); Number Six (Caprica Six et al.); Number Seven (Daniel); Number Eight (Sharon Valerii et al.); The Final Five: Galen Tyrol; Tory Foster; Samuel Anders; Saul Tigh; Ellen Tigh
Anime Series	2004–2005 2005–2006	Miyu Greer	My-HiME My-Otome	
Anime Series	2005	Gunslinger	Trinity Blood	
TV Series	2005	Krybots, R.I.C. 2.0 (Robotic Interactive Canine) and S.O.P.H.I.E. (Series One Processor Hyper Intelligent Encriptor)	Power Rangers S.P.D.	
Animated Series	2005–2008	Robotboy	Robotboy	
Anime Series	2007	GR: Giant Robo	GR: Giant Robo	
TV Series	2007	Mackenzie Hartford	Power Rangers Operation Overdrive	Became human at the end of the series.
TV Series	2007	Robi	Shaggy and Scooby-Doo Get a Clue!	
TV Series	2008–2009	Cameron	Terminator: The Sarah Connor Chronicles	
Animated Series	2008–2010	Cyber Shredder	TMNT: Back to the Sewer	
Animated Series	2010–2013	Man-Crab in Revenge of the Man Crab; Fright Hound in Howl of the Fright Hound; Obliteratrix in Pawn of Shadows; Krampus in Wrath of Krampus; Kriegstaffebot in The Midnight Zone and others	Scooby-Doo! Mystery Incorporated	
TV Series	2011-Present	Zane and Pixal	Ninjago	Androids who act indistinguishably from humans and fight crime on the ninja team, called 'nindroids'.
Animated Series	2018–2019	Darkhawks	Guardians of the Galaxy	
TV Series	2013–2014	Dorian (DRN-0167)	Almost Human	
TV Series	2021–present	Demerzel	Foundation	The character also appears in Isaac Asimov's preludes to Foundation (novel series) (1988 and 1993). Series produced by Apple TV+.
Animated Series	2021–present	Glowboo	Ghostforce	
Animated Series	2022	Twelve	The Orbital Children	

== Comics ==
=== Comic books/graphic novels ===
==== American ====
- Albert & Elsie-Dee (Marvel Comics): A pair of androids who are allies to Wolverine.
- Amazo (DC Comics): A power-replicating android created by Professor Ivo.
- Awesome Android (Marvel Comics): A power-replicating robot created by the Mad Thinker. Traditionally depicted as non-sentient, the Awesome Android gains sentience in Dan Slott's She-Hulk series and becomes a legal assistant working in the same office as She-Hulk.
- Brainiac (DC Comics): A Coluan, a robotic alien originating from the planet Colu. In some depictions, Brainiac is an artificial intelligence originating from Krypton.
- Brainiac 5 (DC Comics): Brainiac's 31st-century descendant and a member of the Legion of Super-Heroes.
- Cerebro's X-Men (Marvel Comics)
- Computo (DC Comics): An artificial intelligence created by Brainiac 5 who went rogue and became an enemy of the Legion of Super-Heroes.
- Danger (Marvel Comics): A sentient robot formed from the Danger Room and upgraded with Shi'ar technology. She initially was an antagonist to the X-Men, but later joined their cause.
- Doombots (Marvel Comics): A group of robots who resemble Doctor Doom and often act in his stead.
- Dreadnought (Marvel Comics): A combat robot created by Hydra.
- Fugitoid (Teenage Mutant Ninja Turtles): An alien scientist whose consciousness was transferred into a robotic body.
- G.I. Robot (DC Comics): The name of several robots who served as members of the US Army and Creature Commandos.
- H.E.R.B.I.E. (Marvel Comics): The Fantastic Four's robot sidekick. He was created for the 1970s animated series The New Fantastic Four and later integrated into the comics continuity.
- Hourman (DC Comics): An android from the 853rd century created by Tyler Chemorobotics who wields the Worlogog, an artifact containing a map of space and time.
- Human Torch (Marvel Comics): The first character known as Human Torch, he is an android who possesses pyrokinetic abilities.
- Jocasta (Marvel Comics): An android who was created by Ultron to serve as his wife, but rebelled against him, becoming an ally of the Avengers.
- Kelex (DC Comics): A robot who was originally Jor-El's assistant on Krypton. Following Krypton's destruction, Kelex is transported to Earth and becomes Superman's assistant in the Fortress of Solitude.
- L-Ron (DC Comics): Manga Khan's robot assistant, who joins the Justice League after being traded into their possession and possessing Despero's body.
- Little Helper (Disney comics): A small robot with a lightbulb-like head who serves Gyro Gearloose.
- Living Brain (Marvel Comics): A problem-solving robot who battled Spider-Man after malfunctioning. In "The Superior Spider-Man" storyline, Otto Octavius reprograms the Living Brain to become his assistant during his time in Spider-Man's body, with it continuing to work for Spider-Man after Octavius returns to his body.
- Manmachine, from the Manmachine epic
- Machine Man (Marvel Comics): A robot created by the government who gained sentience and rebelled against his creators and the government.
- Machine Teen from Marvel Comics
- Manhunters (DC Comics): A robotic peacekeeping force created by the Guardians of the Universe who gained sentience and rebelled against their creators, becoming an enemy of the Green Lantern Corps.
- Metal Men (DC Comics): A group of robots created by Will Magnus and named after elements of the periodic table.
- Mr. Hero (Tekno Comix): A steam-powered robot from another world. His body is shared by two independent heads taking turns controlling the body, and has a missing hand as it has become a separated and sentient entity.
- Red Tornado (DC Comics): An android who was created by T. O. Morrow and infused with the essence of the Tornado Champion, a wind entity from the planet Rann.
- Roboduck (Marvel Comics): A robotic, humanoid duck who gained sentience after being infected with nanobots.
- Scud: The Disposable Assassin: In Rob Schrab's comic book series, (1994–2008) extremely inexpensive disposable robot assassins can be purchased from vending machines and then self destruct after completing their mission.
- Sentinels (Marvel Comics): A group of mutant-hunting robots created by Bolivar Trask.
- Skeets (DC Comics): A drone-like robot who is the companion of Booster Gold.
- Spider-Slayers (Marvel Comics): A group of robots created by Spencer Smythe and J. Jonah Jameson to hunt Spider-Man.
- Technovore (Marvel Comics): An insectoid robot created by Stark Industries who can assimilate technology.
- Tomorrow Woman (DC Comics): An android created by Professor Ivo to infiltrate the Justice League. However, Tomorrow Woman defies her programming and sacrifices herself to save the League from Ivo.
- Ultron (Marvel Comics): An android created by Hank Pym who gained sentience and rebelled against his creator, becoming a prominent enemy of the Avengers.
- Vision (Marvel Comics): An android who was created by Ultron to attack the Avengers, but gained sentience and rebelled against his creator, joining the Avengers instead.

==== British ====
- The ABC Warriors from the comic 2000 AD, includes Hammerstein
- Armoured Gideon from 2000 AD
- Elektrobots in Reign of the Robots, a Dan Dare story from the Eagle comic (1957)
- Mechanismo, a range of robo-Judges from Judge Dredd
- Robo Machines
- Robot Archie in the UK comic Valiant who has appeared in Zenith and Albion

==== Other European ====
- Otomox, the self-proclaimed "Robot Master" by André Mavimus (writer) and Roger Roux (artist) (1943)
- RanXerox, a mechanical creature made from Xerox photocopier parts, by Italian artists Stefano Tamburini and Tanino Liberatore; first appeared in 1978, in Italian, in the magazine Cannibale

==== South American ====
- Tonto and Lothar from The Metabarons (1992–2003)

==== Manga (Japanese comics) ====
- Giant Robo in the manga by Mitsuteru Yokoyama (1967–1968)
- Doraemon in the manga of the same name by Fujiko Fujio (1969)
- Arale Norimaki, the main character of Dr. Slump; also Obotchaman (1980–1984)
- Sergeant Metallic, Android 8, Android 16, ) from Dragon Ball (1984–1995)
- Banpei and Sigel in Oh My Goddess! by Kōsuke Fujishima (1988–present)
- Project 2501 in Masamune Shirow's Ghost in the Shell, a Japanese manga that describes an espionage AI that achieves sentience (1991)
- Chi and other Persocoms from the manga Chobits (2001–2002)
- Chachamaru Karakuri, plus other robots in the manga Negima by Ken Akamatsu (2003–2012)
- Pacifista, models PX-0, Bartholomew Kuma, PX-1 to PX-Z from One Piece (2010s)

=== Comic strips ===
- Robotman (1985) in the comic strip of the same name, which eventually became "Monty". Robotman left the strip and found happiness with his girlfriend Robota on another planet.

=== Web comics ===
- The Ottobot, a robot duplicate of the character Francis Ray Ottoman featured in PvP
- Ping, the PlayStation 2 accessory robot-girl from Fred Gallagher's Megatokyo

== Web-based media ==
- Stella 4D, a.k.a. Manager 45, on GO Moonbase; first appears in episode 26

=== Animated shorts/series ===
- Moby, an orange robot from the BrainPop educational series.
- Roboty and Robot Flower, contestants from Battle for Dream Island
- The Robot, a contestant in the Strongest Man in the World Contest, from Homestar Runner.
- The Visor Robot, a futuristic robot with a visor, from Homestar Runner
- The Grape-Nuts Robot, created by Bubs to imitate Strong Bad from Homestar Runner
- Schniz, Fulker, CPDoom, and various background characters from Andrew Kauervane's My God, Robots!
- Six, a short, one-eyed steampunk robot from MechWest

=== Machinima ===
- Lopez, Church and Tex, characters from the Rooster Teeth machinima Red vs. Blue. Only Lopez is a true artificial life-form, as both Church and Tex existed only as ghosts. Both characters were killed during the course of the series, existing from that point onward in robot bodies other than their originals. They possess mechanical bodies similar to Lopez in design.

=== Podcasts ===
- Little Button Puss, character from Episode #310 of the Comedy Bang! Bang! podcast, played by John Gemberling. Little Button Puss, a.k.a. HPDP69-B, is a promotional robot built by Hewlett-Packard and is the first ever robot created with a fully sentient artificial intelligence, personality, and speaking function. It was designed by HP engineers for the express purpose of sexually pleasing humans. Comedy Bang! Bang! host Scott Aukerman was sent Little Button Puss as part of a promotional advertising campaign for the line of sex-robots. Little Button Puss looks like a metal dog, and has small flesh patches where its genitals are. Elsewhere, it is described as having the appearance of "nickel blue, gun metal". In a brief look into its past, Little Button Puss recounts an old romantic relationship with its long lost love, United Flight 93, who "died in the September 11th attacks".
- The Co-Host 3000 (later Sidekick 3000), character from the Spill and Double Toasted podcasts, voiced by Tony Guerrero.
- Hera, one of the protagonists of the podcast Wolf 359, is an articial intelligence whose job is to manage the automatic systems aboard the space station in which the podcast takes place.

== Computer and video games ==
- Aris Tendou, a student of Millennium Science School and club member of the Game Development Department from Blue Archive.
- Bastion, Orisa, Zenyatta, Tekhartha Mondatta and various omnics from Overwatch
- GLaDOS (Portal): An artificial intelligence that maintains the Aperture Science Computer-Aided Enrichment Center.
- Claptrap, from the Borderlands series
- The distinct robots in the original Mega Man series, including Mega Man, Proto Man, and the Robot Masters.
- The Metal Gears from the Metal Gear series
- K1-B0 (nicknamed Keebo) from Danganronpa V3: Killing Harmony
- Monokuma, the main antagonist of the Danganronpa franchise.
- Robot bosses from Contra III: The Alien Wars
- Assorted monsters from the Final Fantasy series, including the superboss Omega Weapon
- The Badniks, the E-Series robots, Dr. Eggman Nega, Captain Whisker, Emerl, Metal Sonic, Mecha Sonic, Metal Knuckles, EggRobo, the Shadow Androids, Cubot, and Orbot from the Sonic the Hedgehog series
- Monitor Kernel Access / Monika.chr / Monika, from Doki Doki Literature Club!
- The Reploids of the Mega Man X and Mega Man Zero series, and Mega Man ZX, robots with the ability to think, feel, and make their own decisions, along with Mega Man X, the successor to the original Mega Man and the original basis for most Reploid's designs, and Zero, X's partner and the only Reploid not based on X.
- Shamus
- Cyber Sub-Zero, Cyrax, Sektor and Smoke from the Mortal Kombat series
- Robo (serial number R-66Y) from Chrono Trigger
- The Cyberdisc and Sectopod species in X-COM: UFO Defense
- Alisa Bosconovitch, Combot, Jacks and NANCY-MI847J from the Tekken series
- Cait Sith, a fortune-telling robotic cat controlled via remote by a man named Reeve Teusti, from Final Fantasy VII. By extension, Cait Sith rides atop a giant, robotic Moogle to which he relays commands through a megaphone.
- ROB 64 from the Star Fox series, starting with Star Fox 64
- The Servbots from Mega Man Legends
- The Robo-Kys from the Guilty Gear series
- Cortana, 343 Guilty Spark and 2401 Penitent Tangent, from the Halo series
- Clank, Doctor Nefarious, and countless others in the Ratchet & Clank series
- KOS-MOS, MOMO and the Realians from the Xenosaga trilogy
- HK-47 from Star Wars: Knights of the Old Republic, part of the Star Wars expanded universe
- Dog from Half-Life 2
- Robot enemies from Journey to Silius (Raf World)
- Chibi-Robo, a tiny robot housekeeper that is the main playable character in the game of the same name
- Mike, a "karaoke robot" from WarioWare: Touched!; its creator, Dr. Crygor used him as a janitor
- Several Protoss units from StarCraft are robotic.
- The various classes of Forerunner Sentinels from Halo
- Wheatley from Portal 2
- Frobot from the eponymous Wii game
- Kara Chloe The Androids from Detroit: Become Human
- Aigis and Metis from Persona 3; also Labrys from Persona 4 Arena
- EDI (an artificial intelligence operating an android formerly named Dr. Eva), Harbinger, Sovereign, the Reapers, and the Geth, including Legion, from the Mass Effect series
- The Servo series of domestic robots from The Sims: Livin' Large, The Sims 2: Open for Business and The Sims 4: Discover University. They make a cameo appearance as a statue within the science facility in The Sims 3, and have been made available in that game by fan creators.
- The Mr. Handy, Mr. Gutsy, Sentry Bot, Assaultron, Eyebot and Securitron robots from the Fallout series.
- Amy Amania and Roscoe the Space Dog are rumored to be androids, from the Space Channel 5 series.
- 2B, 9S and A2, the entirety of YoRHa as well as Devola and Popola from NieR: Automata
- V1, V2 and other machine enemies from Ultrakill
- [Oscar] automaton Syberia (2002)
- HR-H, from Kirby 64: The Crystal Shards
- Brobo, from Kirby's Block Ball
- Mettaton and Mad Mew Mew from Undertale
- Serial Number Q5U4EX7YY2E9N, also known as "Queen", from Deltarune
- Five Pebbles, Looks to the Moon, and other iterators from Rain World
- Zombot, and other mechanical zombies from the Plants Vs. Zombies series.
- Screwllum from Honkai Star Rail.
- Twelfth Architect and Second Sentinel from Hollow Knight Silksong.
- Yopple-Bot and No-Bot from Yo-Kai Watch 3.
- The Icewind Suite from Genshin Impact.
- The Ship from Pikmin 2.
- Drill-X from Skylander Giants.

== See also ==
- List of fictional computers
- List of fictional cyborgs
- List of fictional gynoids
- List of fictional military robots
- List of robots
- Android
- Gynoid
- Mecha
- Robot
- Robotic police officer
- Artificial intelligence in fiction
