= Seidy López =

Mexican-American actress and director

- Born: Seidy Guadalupe Lopez; Mérida, Yucatán, Mexico
- Occupations: Actress and director
- Years active: 1991–present

Seidy López is a Mexican-American actress and director.

López is best known for her starring debut in the critically acclaimed film Mi Vida Loca. She appeared in Solo, the hit film Selena, an episode of ER directed by Quentin Tarantino, and in Showtime's Resurrection Boulevard. López co-starred in Luminarias and The Elián González Story for the Fox Family Channel, and starred in Blink of an Eye. She also recently directed her first film, American Born, which is in post-production.

== Early life ==
Seidy López was born in Mérida, Yucatán, Mexico. At the age of four, she and her family moved to the United States in search of a more rewarding life. When she turned ten, her parents found it necessary to return to Yucatán with their three children in order to learn how to properly read, write and speak the Spanish language. The López family returned to the States two years later with their children completely bilingual.

== Career ==
Seidy's experience as a performer began at age 12 when she formed a singing group called "Sensation". The group won several talent competitions in Los Angeles. At the age of 14 she decided to focus on her vocal skills, and with the help of her Jr. High teacher, Mr. Gleason, she auditioned for the Los Angeles County High School for the Arts at California State University. As a member of their vocal ensemble, Seidy was given the opportunity to perform in such prestigious venues as the Dorothy Chandler Pavilion. The following year at Hollywood High School of the Performing Arts, Seidy discovered theater and focused her attention on acting. At the age of seventeen Seidy also became a member of an educational theater troupe called "Project Able". The theater troupe toured venues throughout California, including jails and juvenile halls, teaching AIDS education.

Seidy's big break came in 1993 when Allison Anders cast her as Mousie in her critically acclaimed movie Mi Vida Loca,

Starring in this film helped Seidy gain recognition in the Latino community and gave her the opportunity to work with other directors such as Quentin Tarantino, Joel Schumacher and Antoine Fuqua. She has appeared in many of Gregory Nava's films, such as Mi Familia and Selena when she played Debra. Nava later reunited her with Esai Morales in his series American Family. Seidy's career has continued with roles such as Cindy in the film Luminarias, Elian's mother in The Elian Gonzales Story, Gabriela in the self-titled film, and the bakery girl Cynthia Limon in the television series Resurrection Blvd.

She once again plays a character close to Selena Quintanilla, this time as the late singer's mother in the Netflix Original Series, Selena: The Series.

== Personal life ==
Seidy lives with her husband and two children in Los Angeles, California.

== Filmography ==
=== Actress ===
Year	Film	Role	Notes
1992	Tanto tiempo	Luz	
1993	The Painted Desert	Freda	
1993	Mi Vida Loca	Mousie	Alternate title: My Crazy Life
1993	Showdown	Gina	
1995	My Family	Lena, Chucho's Girlfriend	Alternate titles: Cafe con leche East L.A. Family, Mi Familia
1995	Above Suspicion	Theater Clerk	Alternate title: The Rhinehart Theory
1996	Depraved	Ophelia Ramos	
1996	Solo	Agela	
1996	Last Resort	Rita	
1997	Selena: The Movie	Deborah	
1997	El aroma del Copal	Sybille	Alternate titles: Scent of Copal; Scent of Vengeance
1998	Running Woman	Carmela	Alternate title: Urban Jungle
1999	Blink of an Eye	Sophia	
2000	The Stray	Tanya	
2000	Luminarias	Cindy	
2001	Gabriela	Gabriela	
2001	Training Day	Dreamer	

Year	Show	Role	Notes
1991	Veronica Clare	Consuelo	"Naked Hearts"
1995	ER	Rosaria 'Puppet' Gutierrez	"Motherhood"
1997	Riot	Iris	Television movie
2000	A Family in Crisis: The Elian Gonzales Story	Elian's mother	Television movie
2001–2002	Resurrection Blvd.	Cynthia Limon	Three episodes
2002	American Family	Laura	Six episodes Alternate Title: American Family: Journey of Dreams
2003	The Shield	Coco	"Coyotes"
2004	30 Days Until I'm Famous	Jackie Moreno	Television movie
2006	CSI: Crime Scene Investigation	Lucita Ruiz	"Fannysmackin'"
2009	NCIS: Los Angeles	Gail Ramirez	"The Only Easy Day"
2010	House	Christina	"Unwritten"
2020-2021	Selena: The Series	Marcella Samora Quintanilla	

=== Director credits ===
Year	Film	Studio	Cast	Notes
1999	American Born	Panos Productions	Otis Bell, Jack Kyle, P.J. Marino, Pete Panos	
