= Jaime P. Gomez =

American actor (born 1965)

- Born: Jaime Paul Gomez; August 31, 1965 (age 61); Los Angeles, California, U.S.
- Occupations: Film and television actor
- Years active: 1988–present

Jaime Paul Gomez (born August 31, 1965) is an American film and television actor. He is best known for playing Inspector Evan Cortez, one of the inspectors under the command of the title character, in the Special Investigations Unit, in the American police procedural television series Nash Bridges.

Gomez was born in Los Angeles, California. He began his screen career in 1988, appearing in the Fox police procedural television series 21 Jump Street. In 1989, he appeared in his first feature film, Say Anything..., starring John Cusack, Ione Skye and John Mahoney. In the same year, he played the recurring role of Sonny DaSilva in the NBC soap opera television series Generations, appearing in 14 episodes.

== Partial filmography ==
- Say Anything... (1989) - Partier
- Across the Tracks (1991) - Bobby
- L.A. Story (1991) - Tod PA
- Dolly Dearest (1991) - Hector
- American Me (1992) - Eddie
- The Silencer (1992) - Drew
- Ultraman: The Ultimate Hero (1993-1994) - Arturo Mendez (1 episode)
- Crimson Tide (1995) - Ood Mahoney
- Solo (1996) - Sgt. Lorenzo
- Clockwatchers (1997) - Derrick
- Sticks (2001) - Sargento Sanchez
- Gabriela (2001) - Mike
- Training Day (2001) - Mark
- Charmed (2002) - Greg Conroy
- Devil's Knight (2003) - Richie Cobor
- 16 to Life (2009) - Ronald
- Apocalypse According to Doris (2011) - Felix
- I Am Bad (2012) - Dad
- Benjamin Troubles (2015) - Miguel
