= Chickenhawk (book) =

1983 book by Vietnam War veteran Robert Mason

- First edition
- Author: Robert Mason
- Language: English
- Subject: Vietnam War, Helicopter
- Publisher: Viking Press
- Publication date: August 1983
- Publication place: United States
- Media type: Print (Hardcover & Paperback)
- ISBN: 978-0-14-007218-1

Chickenhawk is Robert Mason's narrative of his experiences as a "Huey" UH-1 Iroquois helicopter pilot during the Vietnam War. The book chronicles his enlistment, flight training, deployment to and experiences in Vietnam, and his experiences after returning from the war.

== Writing, publishing, and reaction ==
Mason was encouraged to write his Vietnam memoir by Knox Burger, the editor of an author-friend of Mason (Bill Smith, better known as Martin Cruz Smith). He began writing Chickenhawk on May 17, 1979 while living in Florida. The first chapter written became the fifth chapter in the finished book. By February 1980, Mason had a 200-page partial manuscript (about one-third), and an outline of the rest of his memoir. Knox agreed to offer the book to publishers.

While waiting to see whether Burger could sell the book, after several rejections (i.e. "it is good but no one wants to read about Vietnam"), Mason was running a paper route each night, 100 miles on back roads, and his car blew up. He decided to take a job sailing as a deckhand on a 30-foot boat to Colombia. As he puts it "I found out I could be bought." In January 1981 he was arrested with a boatload of marijuana from Colombia in a creek in South Carolina.

In early 1981, while awaiting trial on the criminal charges, Mason learned that Viking Press had purchased Chickenhawk and started work on finishing the book. He didn't tell Viking about the bust. He wrote steadily submitting each third of the manuscript on time.

By Christmas of that year, the manuscript was finished. Editing was completed by June 1982.

In the meantime, in March 1982, Mason was convicted on the smuggling charges. In August 1982, he was sentenced to five years in a minimum-security prison, but was allowed to remain free on bail pending an appeal of his conviction.

In early August 1983, Chickenhawk was published. Early reviews were positive, including a glowing review in The New York Times. He was booked for an appearance on The Today Show and was interviewed several times. A film version was set to be written and directed by John Carpenter was announced but it was discarded by New World Pictures as it never got made. In the midst of this, Mason's appeals were exhausted and he learned that his incarceration was set to begin on August 19, 1983. The Today Show appearance took place August 15, and sales of the book benefited from the author's own ongoing drama as well as his widely praised writing.

Mason was released on May 17, 1985. While he was imprisoned, Chickenhawk had become a hardcover and paperback best-seller. He was unable to write while in prison.

Mason has subsequently published two novels, Solo and Weapon, as well as a second memoir, Chickenhawk: Back in the World.

== Synopsis ==
Chickenhawk deals chronologically with Mason's training and his experiences in, and immediately after, Vietnam.

The book begins with Mason's training at the Army's Primary Helicopter School at Fort Wolters, Texas. After graduation in May 1965, he eventually learns he will be sent to Vietnam, making the trip in August with the 1st Cavalry Division (Airmobile) aboard the USS Croatan. The Cavalry is initially posted to An Khe, in central South Vietnam, where Mason first experiences combat.

The book then details his year-long posting, including the Battle of Ia Drang, R&R periods in Saigon and Taiwan, his encounters with soldiers of the South Vietnamese army, and his experiences piloting the UH-1 "Huey". Mason eventually transfers to another unit, which is engaged in an unofficial side-business of delivering ice in return for favours and various commodities. In August 1966, as Mason approaches the end of his posting, he develops some signs of post-traumatic stress disorder, which grew worse after his return.

In an epilogue, Mason sketches out his activities upon returning to the US, including his incarceration for smuggling.

== Sequel ==
Mason's post-Vietnam activities were expanded upon in Mason's sequel, Chickenhawk: Back in the World, which was published in 1993.
