= Solo (Mason novel) =

1992 novel by Robert Mason

- First edition
- Author: Robert Mason
- Cover artist: cover artist
- Language: English
- Genre: Science fiction
- Publisher: Putnam (1st edition)
- Publication date: 1992 (1st edition)
- Publication place: United States
- Media type: Print (Hardcover)
- ISBN: 0-425-13748-1 (first edition, hardback)

Solo is a 1993 science fiction novel by Robert Mason. The book was Mason's second novel; he had previously written Weapon and a memoir about his experiences in Vietnam titled Chickenhawk.

== Plot ==
Solo, a robot designed by the US Government as a hyper intelligent super assassin, goes AWOL on his mission in Nicaragua, and finds himself at the bottom of a lake. Reaching the surface Solo realizes that he needs to recharge, and eventually makes his way to New York, acquiring friends along the way. A widowed bag lady named Laura befriends Solo and benefits not only from Solo's friendship, but his protection. Solo is bent on his self-imposed mission to rescue his younger "brother", Nimrod, a newer, more advanced robot. Meanwhile, agents of the Government maneuver to destroy Solo at any cost.

== Film, TV or theatrical adaptations ==
The feature film Solo created in 1996, is an adaptation of the first book of the series, Weapon, and though it borrows the name of the title character from both novels, it is not considered to be true to the source material.

== Sources, references, external links ==
- Sample Chapters from Robert Mason's Website
- Author's Note on Weapon
