= Korey Coleman =

American film critic (born 1971)

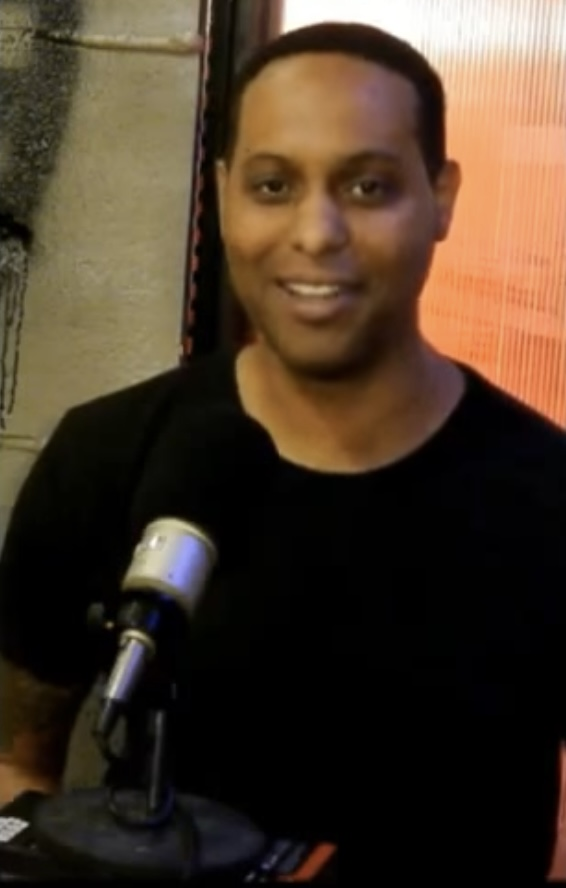
- Coleman in 2015
- Born: September 9, 1971 (age 54); Waco, Texas, U.S.
- Occupations: Critic, podcaster, filmmaker, animator, voice actor, comedian
- Years active: 1996–present
- Spouse: Merve Mia (m. 2017; div. 2023)

Korey Coleman (born September 9, 1971) is an American film critic, animator, podcaster, filmmaker, voice actor, and comedian. He is best known for his now defunct film review site, Spill.com, and its current spiritual successor, Double Toasted.

== Biography ==
Born to Willie and Irma Coleman and the youngest of three, Korey Coleman grew up loving animation and eventually got into University of Texas hoping to major in film making, but eventually dropped out. While there, however, he met fellow artist and future co-host, Martin Thomas who took an interest in his comic strip Eddie the Albino Squirrel. One of his classmates was future Chowder and Harvey Beaks creator C. H. Greenblatt, where they both worked on the school’s newspaper. Coleman also attended school with Russell Neal of the R&B group Hi-Five.

Coleman was also an assistant animator during the production and making of Space Jam. Warner Bros. needed help finishing the project so they hired a team of animators which included Korey. "When they hired us to do effects animation for the movie I wasn't allowed anywhere near the project. One day, though, the team was so behind they pulled me on to do one shadow of Tweety Bird, who in that particular scene is hooked up to an iron lung. I guessed they figured 'it's simple enough that even he can't screw that up'. It probably took ten minutes to do, but I still received a place in the closing credits, right up there with people who had spent weeks working on the film." Coleman reiterated his credit as an "assistant animator"; admitting he was not necessarily assisting, more so he supplied additional work. He also denounced IMDb's claim that he worked on Quest for Camelot, humorously stating, "I've never been to Camelot".

Coleman started a cable access series called The Reel Deal. The show reunited him with Martin and also brought on fellow reviewers Chris Cox, C. Robert Cargill and Tony Guerrero. During this time, Coleman had directed and starred in a movie called 2 A.M. as a way of expanding his film making capabilities. Coleman grew bored of doing an access show and figured the next step would be to expand on a wider level. Taking the preexisting audio from their reviews, Coleman animated over them for comical effect. Cox had posted the videos online where they were seen by Hollywood.com. After meeting the heads of the site, Coleman formed Spill.com. The site ran from 2007 to 2013 with Saving Mr. Banks being their final review. Cox left to start OneofUs.net, Cargill continued his career as a screenwriter and Tony retired from podcasting to become an actor, appearing in Alita: Battle Angel as a henchman (although he does return for a few special occasions). The character of Co-Host 3000 is owned by Hollywood.com.

Coleman decided to start a Kickstarter in launching a new site. The initial goal was $30,000, but by the end they earned $133,860. From there, DoubleToasted was created.

== Personal life ==
Coleman is not religious, but he grew up in a religious household. He recalled waiting until he was 18 years old to finally tell his mother he doesn't believe in God and wasn't going to church anymore, in which his mother quietly and disappointedly responded with "OK." His father was very strict and would often make him work at the family-owned auto shop, sometimes making him do tasks that he didn't know how to do. He said once his father told him to go change a tire for a customer and he returned telling his dad he didn't know how to change a tire.

Before becoming a film critic, Coleman was a member of the National Guard of the United States. He claims once in a discussion that his unit was about to be sent off to Iraq, but right before it happened the US pulled out. His father fought in World War II, the Korean War and the Vietnam War, in the process getting wounded in one of the conflicts.

In August 2016, Coleman proposed to his girlfriend, Merve Mia. Their wedding was on July 7, 2017. They divorced in 2023, and was finalized in mid 2024. Mia has since moved back to her country of Turkey. In March 2026, Coleman revealed that he was in a relationship.

Coleman is friends with The Fast and the Furious star Tyrese Gibson, whom he is prone to make fun of on his show. He briefly shared a mailbox with author Anna Todd whose novel After was adapted into a movie of the same name, which he reviewed on his show. He was once an acquaintance of far-right conspiracy theorist Alex Jones, but has since become highly critical of him and his views, calling him a "charlatan". He endorsed Kamala Harris for the 2024 United States presidential election.

== Filmography ==
=== Production ===
- Space Jam (1996) — assistant animator
- 2 A.M. (2006) — director, producer, writer, editor
- Fresh Baked Video Games (2006) — animator
- Porn Editor (2008) — animator
- Zoovie (2017) — key animator

=== Actor ===
- Courage Under Fire (1996) — Radio Operator, uncredited
- 2 A.M. (2006) — Les
- Grow Up, Tony Phillips (2013) — Mr. Meyers
- Howard Joins the Club (2014) — Korey
- Lazer Team (2015) — Web Bomb! Host
- Another Cinema Snob Movie (2019) — Theater Commentator 1
- The Stockholms (2020) — Cop 1 (voice)
- Not Just a Goof (2024) — Himself (archive; documentary)
