= Weapon (novel) =

1989 novel by Robert Mason

- First edition
- Author: Robert Mason
- Cover artist: cover artist
- Language: English
- Genre: Science fiction
- Publisher: Putnam (1st edition)
- Publication date: 1 March 1989 (1st edition)
- Publication place: United States
- Media type: Print (Hardcover)
- ISBN: 0-399-13447-6 (first edition, hardback)
- Followed by: Solo

Weapon is a 1989 science fiction novel by Robert Mason. The book was Mason's first novel; he had previously written a memoir about his experiences in Vietnam titled Chickenhawk. The book is about an android, designed to kill, which experiences a crisis of conscience and runs away from its government masters to live in a Nicaraguan village.

== Plot ==
The novel describes a new weapon system being developed for the US military, named Solo. A robot, Solo is designed to replace human soldiers in battle. It is humanoid in shape, in order to allow it to use all the military vehicles and equipment human soldiers do. Solo is capable of feats of great speed, strength and endurance.

Most importantly, Solo is governed by a neural network computer which is able to learn and think much as a human brain does. The robot's designer recognises that this could potentially make Solo as unpredictable and difficult to control as any human is; the military therefore insist that Solo be told a carefully edited version of world history and politics in which the United States are in all cases the unambiguously "good guys" and winners of all conflicts - for example Solo is told that the US won a clear victory in the Vietnam War.

Despite his indoctrination, Solo begins to display what his designers consider aberrant behaviour. He begins to question and occasionally refuse his orders. For example, on one training session Solo is assigned to shoot a human target in a sniper mission. He is told that the mission and target are real, and that he is to genuinely kill the person. He point blank refuses to do so. More worryingly to his designers, Solo is not entirely forthcoming about his reasons for such hesitancy.

On another training mission Solo is lost; he is discovered by a group of Nicaraguan villagers who although initially fearful of him, come to trust the robot and depend on his protection. The novel details Solo's developing friendship with the villagers, whilst the US military attempts to recapture him.

== Film and comic adaptations ==
It was adapted to film as Solo in 1996, taking the name of the main character and title of the sequel novel released in 1992. Also, Dark Horse Comics released a two-part comic adaptation of the movie.

== Release details ==
- 1989, U.S., Putnam, ISBN 0-399-13447-6, 1 March 1989, Hardcover
- 1990, U.S., Diamond Books, ISBN 1-55773-309-0, 1 January 1990, Paperback

Paperback edition cover

- 1991, U.S., Dove Entertainment Inc., ISBN 1-55800-405-X, 1 September 1991, Audio cassette
