= Double Toasted =

Entertainment website and podcast

- Website type: Entertainment
- Available in: English
- Predecessor: Spill.com
- Owner: Korey Coleman
- Website: doubletoasted.com
- Registration: Required subscription to view site content
- Launched: July 2, 2014
- Current status: Active

Double Toasted is an entertainment website based in Austin, Texas. The site hosts weekly podcasts covering current events, pop culture, movie reviews and video games.

== History ==
After the closure of Spill.com in 2013, Korey Coleman was encouraged by friends and fans to create a Kickstarter campaign to fund a new home for his content. Coleman and co-host Martin Thomas's friend and fellow Austin resident Brian Brushwood played an important role in the site's creation. Shortly after Spill's closure, he approached them and urged them not to abandon the audience they had built through the website and assisted them with launching the Kickstarter campaign for Double Toasted.

The original goal was set at $30,000. During the campaign, Coleman and Martin Thomas continued to podcast and update fans on the growing total. On the last night, they held a 24-hour live stream with guests and fans stopping by for support. At the end of the stream, the final amount given was $133,860. As a result, doubletoasted.com was created, and launched, on July 2, 2014.

On October 17, 2019, in a video posted on the site's YouTube page, it was announced that Double Toasted would move to Twitch in November, in a deal that would have the site's main shows move to the platform, with the exception of other content, that would continue to be on the site.

== Podcasts and segments ==
Unlike Spill.com, Double Toasted features both audio and video for every show. Since the site's launch in July 2014, there have been several podcasts started - each with a different cast.

=== The Sunday Service ===
Korey Coleman and Martin Thomas sit down for some free-form conversation, the weekend box office, a recap of the week's highlighted stories, and take emails and calls from the audience.

The show occasionally features interviews and appearances from members of the community, a.k.a. 'Toasties'.

Notable guests include:

- Steve-O
- C. Robert Cargill
- Andre Meadows
- Jackie Venson
- Mark Ellis of Schmoes Know

=== What Up, Son! ===
Korey Coleman, Oz Greene Jr., who skypes from New York (although he does appear in person a couple of times whenever he is in town), and Korey's wife, Miss Mia, host this segment. The three talk about the "Free Form Foolishness" in the world and diverge into a variety of topics mixed with casual conversation. The show was initially an audio-only show, but has since moved to video.

Notable guest:

- Alan Ssali Hofmanis of Ramon Film Productions

=== The Weekly Roast and Toast ===
Korey Coleman, Martin Thomas and (sometimes) Billy Brooks roast critically panned movies which are chosen every week by viewers based on a poll. Additionally, they will sometimes look at the latest trailers released and discuss other stories.

Notable guest:

- Correll Bufford

=== The Movie Review Extravaganza ===
Korey Coleman and Martin Thomas share their opinions on the latest releases. Occasionally they will bring a guest to help review the film. The show's introductory song is "Revolution World Crazy" by Panacea. The show initially had a game segment when it first started called 'Martin gets a gold star!' where people had a chance to win a prize. They faded this portion out.

Rating system:

After giving their thoughts on the movie, each critic gives a rating based on how much of your time and money are worth spending on it. Each rating can have a high/low variation. Note that there have been many times where a movie will get vastly different reviews based on the reviewer. The ratings are the same ones carried over from Spill.com. From highest to lowest, they are:

BETTER THAN SEX!	A rating withheld by the crew, this film is excellent, and often pushes the boundaries of cinema as an art form (although not always).
Full Price	A very enjoyable film which is worth paying full price for in the cinema.
Matinee	Worth seeing in the cinema, but not worth paying full price for, or at least during the initial theatrical run. There have been occasions when a movie received this score but the crew still thinks it can be enjoyed at a full-price, just don't go in expecting anything too amazing.
Rental	Can be enjoyed, but still has a variety of flaws. This is worth waiting paying very little to see after the theatrical release. Rental is usually reserved for a movie that is ok but nothing special.
Some Ol' Bullshit!	The crew recommend against paying any money to see this film, and has very little that redeems it, although there have been numerous times where a movie got a "Some Ol' Bullshit" rating but the crew admits that they had fun watching the movie because it is so silly and stupid.
FUCK YOU!	The crew actively recommends against seeing this film at all. This rating is typically given when a critic is generally angered or offended by a film's content (usually when they feel it has personally insulted their intelligence), and indicates that it has absolutely no redeeming qualities.

Once the review has been posted on the site, members of the community can give a one to five star rating, depending on what they thought of the film.

=== DT Interviews ===
Korey also hosts interview segments separate from the other shows.

- Ricardo González, Mike Guasch and Toni Calderon from The Gentleman Driver
- Mary Lynn Rajskub
- Steve Johnson
- Xavier Neal-Burgin
- Lisa Henson (episode was not aired live at the request of Henson)
- Jhonen Vasquez
- Keith David
- Alexandre O. Philippe
- William Conlin
- Andrew Shea
- Sergio Pablos
- Sam Sawyer creator of S.A.L.E.M.
- Jerry Minor
- Rob Paulsen
- Bruce W. Smith
- J.D. and Pilar Witherspoon.
- Chris Stuckmann
- Doug Walker
- James Rolfe

== Former shows ==
=== The Casual Call-In Show ===
Korey Coleman, Danielle Dallaire and Ray Villarreal answered fan questions through phone calls, Skype and emails. The show was initially released every Monday, but ceased in February 2017 due to low viewership.

=== The Spoiler Show ===
William Valle discussed movies in depth. Korey Coleman was featured as a guest, but after one episode, which was heavily criticized, the show was immediately terminated.

=== The Double Dribble ===
Ray Villareal and co-host Chase Arthur discussed sports and other extracurricular activities in a free-form discussion. The show was canceled in June 2017 when Chase left the site and Ray chose not to continue it. Special guest includes:

- Mia Khalifa (multiple occasions)

=== The High Score / 8-Bit Crumbs ===
A video game themed news and discussion show with playthroughs. It was hosted by Korey Goodwin and Patrick Girts. Girts was later replaced by T.J. Manatsa. The show was released every Saturday and had its last show on May 26, 2018. It was replaced with a new show hosted by Korey Coleman and Chris Herman. This also was retired with Korey opting to give brief gaming news on the other shows.

=== Toast to Toast ===
William Valle hosted a short form talk show where he focused on a specific topic related to politics, social issues, or popular culture. He also features a special guest, usually someone from the crew, every episode. The show was released every other Friday. It was canceled because Valle felt the show was repetitive to the already existing shows. Valle would later bring Toast to Toast's format to a new show called Night Class on his own website Camel Moon.

=== Sammy Ain't Seen Sh*t ===
A spin-off segment from the Weekly Roast and Toast. This segment focuses on film school graduate Sammy González, who along with Chris Herman (formally Ian Butcher), take a look at important or classic films that they had not seen until recently. The show was released every Thursday. It ended after Sammy left the show to pursue personal projects.

=== What's in the Box ===
DJ Milez and Comic book writer, Christian Torres talk about television shows and dive into TV and other related news. The show abruptly came to an end on August 8, 2019.

=== The Daily Double Talk ===
Korey Coleman and Christian Torres talk about news in entertainment. Originally an audio only podcast with Korey and Tommy.

== Cast ==
Hosts	Description
Korey Coleman	Owner and creator of Doubletoasted.com, film critic, actor, voice actor, and animator. Also known as Captain Matinee due to giving majority of movies different variations of a Matinee (low matinee, high matinee) and for being very passionate. He has a strong distaste for "black foolishness" and boasts an exuberant and dramatic personality. A running gag involves his bizarre childhood, his head shape, his strange ability to make very peculiar friends, and how his dead father would react to him today. Korey has an alter-ego dubbed Korey-Bot, a robot puppet who is more rude and impolite than him. Korey actually has work history with Hollywood, first being an animator on the movie Space Jam. He also played a navy marine in the movie Courage Under Fire.
Martin Thomas	Co-Host on The Sunday Service, The Weekly Roast and Toast and The Movie Review Extravaganza. Animator. Film Critic. Also known as Cat Daddy Thomas. Being older than Korey, he has a more intuitive look into things. He is sometimes harsher on films than Korey which leads to disagreements between the two. He is constantly the butt of jokes with his unusual stories (such as when he killed a turtle), his tastes and loves to make bad puns. He is a major comic book fan and is knowledgeable with superheroes. He has children and his daughters had appeared on the show on a couple occasions. His daughter received credit for the film Shelby Oaks.
Oswald "Oz" Greene Jr.	Co-host on What Up Son. He interacts with the crew on a webcam from New York City. He is jovial and friendly and loves blasting "black foolishness" with Korey.
Billy Brooks	Co-host on The Weekly Roast and Toast. His brother is actor Mehcad Brooks and his father is former American football wide receiver Billy Brooks. He has a wild and eccentric personality and is famous for his laugh dubbed "The Billy Cackle". A running gag would involve Korey attempting to have Billy give into his notorious laugh by showing him an unintentionally humorous moment in a bad film. He is sometimes more observant than Korey.
Julian Green	Occasional co-host on The Movie Review Extravaganza. He is one of the younger members on the site and is there to add more variety to the review. He displays a lack of knowledge of concurrent culture, such as not knowing who Chip and Dale are and being utterly confused by the concept of Gorillaz. Korey and Martin usually make fun of him for his lackluster stories and for constantly being taken off guard by minor things, such being called from an airplane. He also frequently talks about his money troubles.
Julien Hemmendinger	Former co-host of The Sunday Service and occasional co-host on The Movie Review Extravaganza and other shows. He is an actor, comedian, and Twitch streamer. Julien is known for constantly interconnecting plots of movies/tv to video games. After a situation between him and Julian Green, as well as community backlash regarding his personality and behavior, Julien was removed from co-hosting Double Toasted shows. Korey specified that he would remain on the site to perform background work.
Marcos Lira	Co-host of The Sunday Service. He is a huge fan of sports, video games and anime.
Adam Farciert	Co-host of What Up Son, Korey’s roommate and occasionally appearing on other shows. Referred to by Korey and Oz as “The Cumbia King."
Tony "Sidekick 3000" Guerrero	Co-host only appears very rarely and only during special holidays (mostly Halloween shows) and event shows. He is usually depicted as a flying robotic toaster, typically opposite Korey. He was originally known as Co-Host 3000 on Spill.com. He has appeared without the robot animation once on the Resident Evil 2 playthrough episode. He is also an actor and as appeared in Alita: Battle Angel as an angry Mexican henchman, and in the indie film Woods Porn. His favorite bands are Cannibal Corpse and Faith No More. Tony and Korey are both huge fans of the Resident Evil video games. Despite being on here, Co-Host hasn't been on the show since 2019, with the last videos being a Resident Evil 2 Remake playthrough, and a review of Tales from the Hood 2.

Former co-hosts include:

- Tommy McGrew – The first regular co-host to be added to the show after the closing of Spill.com. McGrew has not appeared on the site since 2016 when he was involved in a fatal hit and run accident, killing a pedestrian. Despite being a "hit and run," Tommy did eventually return to the scene later in a different car to avoid suspicion where another bystander finally called 911 and he denied any involvement when police arrived. Besides the initial update to Tommy's situation in mid 2016, Korey Coleman, and the rest of the Double Toasted crew have refrained from mentioning his name on the site, similar to the WWE with Chris Benoit. Korey has stated only once, after getting many emails about Tommy's return to the site, that the chances of McGrew returning to the site is highly unlikely. However, Tommy made a surprise appearance on a February 2019 show where he revealed that he did not get any jail time, but is on probation for ten years and had to seek therapy to help cope with the fact that he killed someone. This statement is false, however, as he did serve 6 months in jail for his crime. He says that after 10 years of good behavior, he will be given a clean slate. He has expressed interest in returning, but Korey confirmed that it would be impossible for things to go back to the way it was.
- Christopher "Juicy" Herman - Former co-host on The Sunday Service and 8-Bit Crumbs. He's known for his amicable personality on and off camera. He tends to have very staunch opinions on film and television that sometimes clash with the rest of the crew. A running gag involves his lack of knowledge regarding music. He runs a side account on OnlyFans where he will read fanfiction relating to Sonic the Hedgehog while dressed as the titular character. In August 2023, he left the website to focus on his own online content. Korey has since indicated that he and Herman were no longer on good speaking terms, due to his constant outbursts and short temper, as well as his actions and accusations against Korey after leaving Doubletoasted.
- Merve "Mia" Coleman - Former co-host on What Up Son and occasional co-host on various shows. She is from Turkey and she is also the ex-wife of Korey Coleman. While not as seasoned due to her upbringing, she can make a conversation interesting and occasionally brings very intuitive insight. Upon divorcing Korey, she left the site.
- Patrick Girts – Former co-host on the High Score, The Movie Review Extravaganza and The Weekly Roast and Toast. Girts chose to leave due to the stresses of working on three shows late at night and wanting to focus on a career in marketing. He still makes occasional appearances and is the usually the subject of Korey's numerous diatribes.
- Danielle Dallaire – Former co-host on What Up Son and occasionally co-hosted on various shows. She left to pursue other opportunities. Though Danielle had initially claimed that it would only be for a year, Korey Coleman has openly doubted it with Danielle confirming that it was a long term job. Her final show was on May 14, 2018. In mid-2021, Danielle returned, seemingly as a regular and began to appear more often. On November 9, 2021, Korey announced that he banned her from the show due to her behavior. However, on May 21, 2023, Danielle made an unexpected guest appearance.
- Korey Goodwin – Former host of The High Score and co-host on The Weekly Roast and Toast and The Movie Review Extravaganza. He can speak Mandarin. His final show was on June 13, 2018. He left to go focus on his own personal career. He still makes occasional appearances.
- Sam "Sammy" González – Former editor and regulator of the fan pages. Host on Sammy Ain't Seen Sh*t. Occasional co-host on various shows. He left to pursue other interests. His final show was on April 28, 2019. He still makes occasional appearances.
- Ian Butcher – Former co-host on Sammy Ain't Seen Sh*t and Toast to Toast.
- Taylor "Kung-Fu T.J." Manatsa – Former co-host on The High Score. He still makes occasional appearances.
- Chase Arthur – Former co-host of the Double Dribble.
- Ray Villareal – Also known as rapper "Tone Royal", former co-host of the Double Dribble. He still makes occasional appearances.
- William Valle – Former editor and contributor for the site. Occasional co-host on various shows. He talked about controversial topics. He still makes occasional appearances.
- Shea Young – The first female cast member added to the site. Shea left in February 2016 to pursue other opportunities, and because of negative fan reaction to her. She is the only former member who have not made an appearance after leaving the site. Her current location is unknown.
- Robert "DJ Milez" Araya – Former co-host on What's in the Box.
- Christian Torres - Former Co-host on The Daily Double Talk, former co-host on What's in the Box. Author of comic, Here We Are Lost.
- Carlos Nieves - Former fill in co-host on What Up Son and occasional guest on various shows. He is from Puerto Rico and worked on the site helping run the servers to keep it up. He is known for his thick accent and propensity to ramble about subjects, most of which he ends up getting wrong or confusing for something else. Korey has a tendency to pick on him for many of his passionate outbursts.

== Awards and recognition ==
The site has been nominated for several awards, and won The Austin Chronicle Best of Austin 2015: Best Podcast.
