= Robert Mason (writer) =

American author

- Born: March 20, 1942 (age 84)
- Military career
- Allegiance: United States
- Branch: United States Army
- Service years: 1964–1968
- Rank: Warrant Officer 1
- Nickname: "Bob"
- Units: 229th Assault Helicopter Battalion, 1st Cavalry Division (Airmobile) 48th Aviation Co. Vietnam
- Conflicts: Vietnam War: Battle of Ia Drang, Battle of Bong Son, Happy Valley

Robert C. Mason (born March 20, 1942) is a Vietnam War veteran and author of several books, including his first, best-selling memoir: Chickenhawk (1983). Mason piloted Huey "Slicks" in the United States Army as a Warrant Officer 1. He sailed to Vietnam with the 1st Cavalry Division (Airmobile) and served a one-year tour, nine months with the "First Cav", the last three months with the 48th Aviation Company.

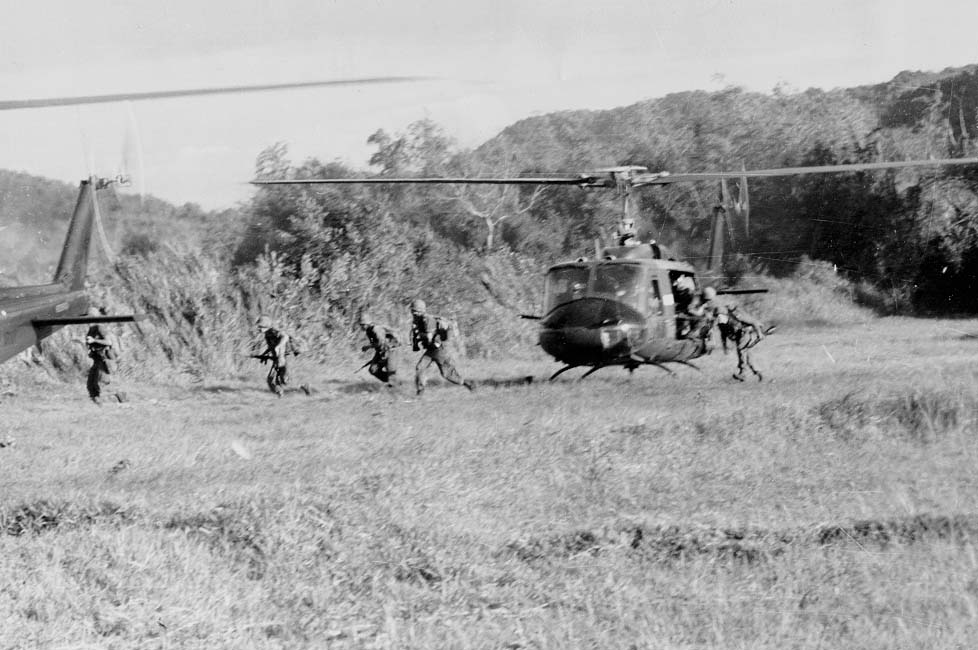
Soldiers of 1st Battalion 7th Cavalry disembark from a UH-1 Huey at Landing Zone X-Ray during the Battle of Ia Drang

Mason spent his first month in Vietnam clearing land for his unit's airbase, after which he and his fellow pilots flew many missions to resupply the infantry and pick up wounded. At that time 1st Cavalry Medevac helicopters were not allowed to fly if the landing zone was hot. While serving with the 1st Cavalry, Mason was involved in several battles and other missions, including the Battle of Ia Drang and the Battle of Bong Son.

Mason transferred to the 48th Aviation Company (referred to as the 49th in his memoir) in May 1966. He continued to fly helicopters, including assault missions for the 101st Airborne in Dak To as part of Operation Hawthorne in June 1966.

After his one-year tour of duty, Mason became an instructor pilot at Fort Wolters, Texas. Eventually he was grounded for dizzy spells and diagnosed with combat fatigue resulting from his service in Vietnam. Later, he and his wife realized he was suffering from posttraumatic stress disorder.

In 1979, Mason began to write a book about his tour in Vietnam. He named it Chickenhawk after a conversation he and his friend and fellow helicopter pilot Jerry Towler had had in 1965 while waiting to pick up some GIs in Vietnam, describing their alternating feelings of terror and courage as they flew missions.

In 1981, Mason was arrested for smuggling marijuana on a boat from Colombia. A month later his agent sold Chickenhawk to Viking Penguin based on the one third of the book Mason had delivered. Mason did not tell anyone of his arrest, including his agent and his editor, until they finished the rest of the book and read the last page.

Chickenhawk was published in 1983, and Christopher Lehmann-Haupt gave it a positive review in The New York Times. Mason was invited to appear on The Today Show on a Wednesday and had to show up at Eglin Federal Prison Camp on the following Friday. Chickenhawk became a hardcover and paperback best-seller. It received many positive reviews, inspiring People magazine to do a story on his troubles under the heading "Trouble."

Mason was released from prison on May 17, 1985. He has subsequently published two novels, Weapon and Solo, as well as a second memoir, Chickenhawk: Back in the World. In 1996, Columbia/Tristar released a film (Solo) based on Mason's first novel, but which used the title of the second.

Mason was the Executive Producer of Flightline: Army Helicopter Pilots of Vietnam, a 2000 documentary hosted and narrated by Harrison Ford.

== Bibliography ==
- Chickenhawk (1983) ISBN 0-670-21582-1
- Solo series (the 1996 film is based on the first book):
  1. Weapon (1989) ISBN 0-399-13447-6
  2. Solo (1992) ISBN 0-399-13734-3
- Introduction to Recovering from the War, by Patience H.C. Mason (1990) ISBN 0-14-009912-3
- Chickenhawk: Back in the World: Life After Vietnam (1993) ISBN 0-670-84835-2
