= Spill.com =

Film review website

- Website type: Film review, podcasts
- Available in: English
- Dissolved: 2013
- Successor: Double Toasted
- Owner: Hollywood.com
- Creator: Korey Coleman
- Revenue: Unknown
- Website: spill.com (archived)
- Launched: 2006
- Current status: Closed

Spill.com was a movie review, discussion and news website. It was the continuation of the Austin, Texas-based public-access television cable TV show called The Reel Deal. There were five main film critic contributors to the website, collectively known as the Spill Crew: Korey Coleman, Chris Cox, Martin Thomas, C. Robert Cargill, and Tony Guerrero. Under aliases, with the exception of Coleman, they reviewed movies as animated versions of themselves or in uncut audio reviews, maintaining their personas in weekly podcasts. Stylistically, the site strived to maintain a "down-to-earth vibe". In July 2013, Spill.com had over 50,000 registered members. On December 6, 2013, the site's shutdown was announced.

== History ==
The Reel Deal was the precursor to Spill.com. The show began in Austin, Texas, as a live call-in format cable access television program from the same local channel where Alex Jones of Infowars and Matt Dillahunty of The Atheist Experience also emerged, developing a strong fan base locally. The show featured a cast of rotating members discussing and reviewing movies, along with other topics. Spliced in between these discussions were skits that parodied popular movies and current topics.

Korey Coleman tried experimenting with short animated versions of movie reviews, which were uploaded onto YouTube. It was then discovered by Dave McCarthy, an executive at MIVA Inc., a marketing corporation. McCarthy and MIVA offered to finance Korey, aiding him in starting the website in 2007. MIVA owned the website, handling the marketing, design and logistics of the site, while letting Korey and the other members of Spill.com create content independently. While the creative team has grown and expanded over the years, Coleman was involved in the animation process. The site was bought by Hollywood.com, owned by R&S Investments, in 2009. In 2009 and 2012, Spill received the People's Choice Podcast Award for Best Film/Movie Podcast.

=== Critics ===
There were five main film critics on Spill.com. With the exception of Coleman, they used aliases on the site due to legal issues. They were Coleman, founder of the site and main host; Chris Cox as Cyrus, previously part of The Reel Deal; Martin Thomas as Leon, part of The Reel Deal and defunct Behind The Screens; and Film.com, C. Robert Cargill as Carlyle, and Tony Guerrero as The Co-Host 3000, also part of The Reel Deal. Guerrero (as Co-Host) appeared in animation as a floating spherical robot, rather than a caricature of himself. Reviews usually included two or more of the critics, though some included Korey on his own. Cargill left the site in 2009, although he briefly returned for the review of Sinister.

== Site shutdown ==
Coleman announced on December 6, 2013 that the site would shut down, saying that Hollywood.com, made the decision. After an outpouring of support from fans, Coleman created a Kickstarter to fund a new project. On December 20, 2013, Hollywood.com shut down Spill's site and redirected it to the Hollywood.com home page.

== After the shutdown ==
At the end of December, Coleman and Thomas began uploading podcasts on SoundCloud while developing their new website. With the revenue from the New Beginnings Kickstarter started by Coleman, which raised $133,860 on a $30,000 goal, Korey and Martin were able to create a new website, DoubleToasted.com with close friend Tommy McGrew. The website launched in July 2014 and contains six shows: The Sunday Service, The Casual Call In Show, The Weekly Roast and Toast, The Daily Double Talk, The Movie Review Extravaganza and The High Score. Unlike Spill, Double Toasted features both audio and video recorded forms of every show. As of April 2026, the site's corresponding YouTube channel has over 311,000 subscribers.

Chris Cox currently operates the website OneOfUs.Net. The site hosts podcasts, video interviews and documentaries, as well as movie reviews. The company also produces two theatrical shows in Austin-based movie theaters, The Roxy Horror Picture Show (a horror-themed show) and One Man's Trash (which hosts "so-bad-they're-good" films). The tone of the site resembles the Spill podcast The League of Extremely Ordinary Gentlemen with most of its cast returning, as well as many younger members who were fans of Spill.

Cargill went on to become a screenwriter and film producer. He co wrote the Sinister films, Marvel's Doctor Strange and The Black Phone. He is also a published novelist. Cargill, along with one of the League of Extraordinary Gentlemen's frequent guest host Brian Salisbury, have been doing a podcast called Junkfood Cinema since 2014.

Cargill has also been a part of several additional podcasts including Write Along with fellow author David Chen.
