= List of M.A.S.K. toys and characters =

The following is a list of characters and vehicles from the M.A.S.K. media franchise, including the toyline and its television adaptation. The toyline lasted longer than the cartoon series.

== Toylines ==
=== Kenner ===
There were five different waves of toys released by Kenner. Some packaging was altered for the European market to make the line seem less violent, such as revising box art so that vehicles' weapons were not shown firing, or, in several cases, changing vehicle names entirely. Additionally, Europe received four adventure packs that were not released in North America, as well as several extra action figure two-packs with redecoed figures.

Series	Year	Description
Series One	1985	The original toyline featuring many of the central characters from the animated television series.
Series Two	1986	A second line that expanded on the first by adding more characters from the series.
Adventure Packs	1986	A series of blister packs containing single figures and accessories, some of which were only available in Europe.
Series Three	1987	The third series of toys that were based on the second season of the animated series, whose plots centered around race driving.
Series Four	1987–1988	The fourth series was subtitled Split Seconds, consisting of a vehicle that split in two along with a pair of action figures, one of which was a transparent version of the main figure intended as a hologram of the featured character. This toyline was released a year after the animated series had ended.

=== The Loyal Subjects ===
The Loyal Subjects and Hasbro relaunched M.A.S.K. toyline in 2025.

== M.A.S.K. members and their vehicles ==
M.A.S.K. (short for Mobile Armored Strike Kommand) is the name of the organisation who fights against the forces of V.E.N.O.M.

Among its known members in order of appearance are:

Character	Description	Voice performer
Matt "Hunter" Trakker	The leader of M.A.S.K. and the main protagonist of the franchise, Matt Trakker is a multi-millionaire and philanthropist. He was one of the creators of the original M.A.S.K. team, along with his teenage brother Andy and Miles Mayhem, the latter of whom double-crosses Matt and causes Andy's death when he steals some of the masks for his newly established organization V.E.N.O.M. In the animated series, Matt's father, Andrew, saved the life of a tribesman who had attempted to come to Andrew's aid after his plane crashed in New Guinea. For his bravery and kindness, Andrew was given a stone that was used to power the masks. In the 2008 "Specialist Trakker" action figure released in 2008 for the G.I. Joe toyline, he is a technology and stealth expert for the Joe team while V.E.N.O.M. is a branch of Cobra.	Doug Stone
Matt "Hunter" Trakker	Vehicle / Mask / Description; Thunderhawk / Spectrum / A red Chevrolet Camaro, which can transform into a gull-winged fighter jet. First show appearance is episode 1. His Spectrum mask contains multiple capabilities such as firing deafening soundwaves, allowing limited free-fall flight, firing a laser, and allowing Trakker to see in different visual spectrums.; Rhino / Ultra-Flash / A maroon Kenworth W900 semi-tractor that converts into a mobile defense platform and command center with a detachable ATV. First show appearance is episode 1. His Ultra-Flash mask fires a blinding blast of energy. First show appearance of Trakker in his Rhino uniform with Ultra-Flash mask is episode 3.; Volcano / Lava Shot / A dark blue Dodge monster truck van that converts into an attack station. First show appearance is episode 47. His mask, Lava Shot, fires blobs of lava.; Jungle Challenge / Arrow / An assault jet pack which he uses with the Arrow mask which shoots thunderbolts.; Coast Patrol / Dolphin / An armed rescue raft which he uses with the Dolphin mask which emits sonic signals.; Goliath I / Shroud / A yellow and indigo Formula One race car that launches from Nevada Rushmore's vehicle, Goliath II, and becomes a fighter jet. First show appearance is episode 67. He uses the Shroud mask that creates a temporary fog.; Skybolt / New Spectrum / A McDonnell Douglas F-4 Phantom II jet fighter that splits into an turbo-boost car and aerial attack craft. His accompanying mask is New Spectrum which also creates a holographic double.	Doug Stone
Scott Trakker	The son of Matt Trakker who raised him alone, Scott has great mechanical skills and built his robot companion T-Bob.	Brennan Thicke
T-Bob	The cowardly robot sidekick of Scott Trakker that converts into a three-wheel scooter (a single-wheeler in the animated series), T-Bob cracks bad jokes and is easily frightened. According to the UK-produced comic series by Fleetway Publications, T-Bob was short for "Thingamabob".	Graeme McKenna
Bruce "Magic" Sato	A Japanese-American mechanical engineer and design specialist who serves as Matt Trakker's de facto second-in-command, Bruce tends to speak in Confucian riddles that often confuse his teammates except Trakker. His occupation is a toymaker.	Doug Stone
Bruce "Magic" Sato	Vehicle / Mask / Description; Rhino / Lifter / He operates the ATV portion of Rhino, though in the animated series he frequently drives the main vehicle itself while Trakker drives Thunderhawk. His mask, Lifter, creates an anti-gravity field.; Rescue Mission / Grasshopper / A helipack and the Grasshopper mask allowing him to jump incredible distances.; Dynamo / New Lifter / A Volkswagen dune buggy that splits into a helicopter and assault cart. His mask, New Lifter, also creates a holographic double.	Doug Stone
Alex "Megabyte" Sector	Computer and communications expert and zoologist who hails from Britain, his occupation is a veterinarian and exotic pet store owner. Alex's action figure was included with the Boulder Hill playset.	Brendan McKane
Alex "Megabyte" Sector	Vehicle / Mask / Description; Rhino / Jackrabbit / He serves as systems commander in this battle truck. His Jackrabbit mask allows him to fly.; The Collector / Disruptor / A tollbooth that transforms into an attack installation and where he uses the Disruptor mask to disrupt radio transmissions. First show appearance is episode 67.	Brendan McKane
Dusty "Powderkeg" Hayes	Stunt performer, all-terrain specialist, and tracking and demolitions expert, his occupation is a pizza cook/deliveryman.	Doug Stone
Dusty "Powderkeg" Hayes	Vehicle / Mask / Description; Gator / Backlash / An orange Jeep CJ7 containing a releasable hydroplane. First show appearance is episode 1. His Backlash mask fires a kinetic blast.; Billboard Blast / Vacuum / A billboard that opens up to reveal a gun emplacement. He uses the Vacuum mask that creates pockets of vacuum energy.; Afterburner / New Backlash / A dragster that splits into a small jet plane and an elevated turret. His New Backlash also produces a holographic clone.	Doug Stone
Brad "Chopper" Turner	Expert hill climber, motorcycle driver, and helicopter pilot, his occupation is a rock musician.	Graeme McKenna
Brad "Chopper" Turner	Vehicle / Mask / Description; Condor / Hocus Pocus / A neon green Kawasaki motorcycle that converts into an open-top one-man helicopter. First show appearance is episode 1. His Hocus Pocus mask projects realistic holograms.; Razorback / Eclipse / A red and white Ford Thunderbird stock car that turns into an elevated armed-rescue tank. First show appearance is episode 70. His mask, Eclipse, creates a field of inky darkness.	Graeme McKenna
Hondo "Striker" MacLean	Weapons specialist and tactical strategist, his occupation is a high school history teacher.	Doug Stone
Hondo "Striker" MacLean	Vehicle / Mask / Description; Firecracker / Blaster / An orange Ford F-350 pickup truck that elevates into a mobile weapon platform with a detachable dirt bike. First show appearance is episode 1. He uses the Blaster mask that fires a destructive heat-based beam.; Hurricane / Blaster II / A turquoise 1957 Chevrolet that turns into a six-wheeled field command post. He uses the improved Blaster II mask. First show appearance is episode 1 (in the intro). Hondo is assigned the Hurricane vehicle after Firecracker is destroyed by V.E.N.O.M.'s gravity-increasing force field in episode 29, but Firecracker later reappears in episode 54, solely driven by Buddie from this point. In some episodes, Hurricane is referred to as Nightstalker.; Sea Attack / Blaster II / A small attack boat (Europe-only release).; Ramp-Up / New Blaster / A repair ramp that turns into a tank. This toy was intended as part of the 1987-88 Split Seconds series but was never released.	Doug Stone
Buddie "Clutch" Hawks (Note: This spelling of the character's name appears on official toy packaging, but has alternated in other series media as "Buddy Hawks" or "Buddie Hawkes".)	A master of disguise and intelligence expert, his occupation is a mechanic. As an action figure, Hawks originally came with the Boulder Hill playset.	Mark Halloran
Buddie "Clutch" Hawks	Vehicle / Mask / Description; Firecracker / Penetrator / Hawks often serves as co-pilot of Firecracker with Hondo MacLean. His Penetrator mask allows him to pass through solid objects.; Hurricane / Penetrator / In some episodes, Hawks serves as pilot of Hurricane. He also uses the Penetrator mask with it.; Wildcat / Ditcher / A red Ford F-350 tow truck that turns into a vertical fighting machine. First show appearance is episode 66. He uses the Ditcher mask which gouges into the earth and rock digging wide trenches.	Mark Halloran
Gloria Baker	A champion race car driver and black belt in Kung Fu, her occupation is a sensei.	Sharon Noble
Gloria Baker	Vehicle / Mask / Description; Shark / Aura / A white Porsche 928 that transforms into a submarine. First show appearance is episode 2. Her Aura mask produces energy-absorbing force shields. Shark appeared only on the show and was never released in the toyline. In 2023, Ramen Toy began releasing a line of toys based on those of M.A.S.K., called Makina Labs. To date, it has released four: Great White (based on Shark), Red Gullwing (based on Thunderhawk), Boy & Bot (based on T-Bob), and Mobula (based on Manta).; Stiletto / New Collider / A Lamborghini Countach that splits into an attack helicopter and raid plane. Her mask is New Collider which also produces her holographic clone.	Sharon Noble
Jacques "Trailblazer" LaFleur	A natural disaster specialist and martial artist, his occupation is a lumberjack. His hometown is Quebec, Canada.	Brendan McKane
Jacques "Trailblazer" LaFleur	Vehicle / Mask / Description; Volcano / Maraj / He is the co-pilot (he operates the rotating turret when the vehicle is in defense mode) and his mask is Maraj (Note: An alternate spelling of "mirage" was created specifically for the series.) which creates an invisibility screen. In the animated series, however, he frequently operates Volcano alone.; Glider Strike / Maraj / An armed mini-glider in which he also uses the Maraj mask.; Detonator / New Maraj / A magenta Volkswagen Beetle that separates into an aerial attack craft and an assault quad bike. The New Maraj mask also creates a holographic clone of himself.	Brendan McKane
Ace "Falcon" Riker	Former NASA test pilot, his occupation is a hardware store owner.	Mark Halloran
Ace "Falcon" Riker	Vehicle / Mask / Description; Slingshot / Ricochet / A white Volkswagen camper van that splits in half to reveal a launch ramp, that carries a red sonic jet. First show appearance is episode 48. His mask is Ricochet (also called Boomerang), which fires an energy boomerang.; Meteor / Cruise Control / A white Grumman F-14 Tomcat jet stunt plane that splits into a smaller aerial fighter and a missile launching tank. First show appearance is episode 71. His Cruise Control mask takes control of vehicles' speed.	Mark Halloran
Calhoun "Cowboy" Burns	A construction and demolition specialist who raises horses in his spare time, his occupation is an architect.	Graeme McKenna
Calhoun "Cowboy" Burns	Vehicle / Mask / Description; Raven / Gulliver / A black Chevrolet Corvette that turns into an armed airboat. First show appearance is episode 49. He uses the Gulliver mask (Note: Named such after Gulliver's Travels.) that temporarily enlarges or shrinks objects.; Arctic Assault / Gulliver / An armed jetpack released only in Europe, he also uses the Gulliver mask with it.	Graeme McKenna
Julio "Doc" Lopez	Expert in cryptography and foreign languages, his occupation is a physician.	Graeme McKenna
Julio "Doc" Lopez	Vehicle / Mask / Description; Firefly / Streamer / An orange Volkswagen dune buggy that turns into a jet. First show appearance is episode 49. His mask is called Streamer which fires sticky bands of glue, a fire-suppresent foam, or an oil-like substance. In one episode, Firefly was referred to as Dragonfly.; Fireforce / New Streamer / A 1987 Pontiac Fiero that splits into a glider craft and three-wheeled attack motorcycle. He uses the New Streamer mask which can also create a holographic clone of himself.	Graeme McKenna
Boris "The Czar" Bushkin	A big, bald Russian who debuted in the racing-themed second season of the animated series as a double agent that was posing as a V.E.N.O.M. agent during a demolition derby. His occupation is a truck driver.	Doug Stone
Boris "The Czar" Bushkin	Vehicle / Mask / Description; Bulldog / Comrade / A bluish gray Kenworth K100 diesel truck (light gray in the cartoon) that turns into a half-track tank. First show appearance is episode 66. His mask, Comrade, fires red energy stars to disorientate opponents. Bulldog was renamed Bulldoze for the European market.	Doug Stone
"Chief" Nevada Rushmore	A Native American and Matt Trakker's childhood friend, he debuted in the second season of the animated series. His occupation is a mechanic.	Brendan McKane
"Chief" Nevada Rushmore	Vehicle / Mask / Description; Goliath II / Totem / An indigo Ford L8000 flatbed truck that turns into a command station/missile launcher, and serves as a launch platform for Trakker's Goliath I racing vehicle. First show appearance is episode 67. His mask, Totem, fires small totem-shaped projectiles.	Brendan McKane
Ali "Lightning" Bombay	An immigrant from Kandukar, India, he debuted in the second season of the animated series. His occupation is a motorcycle racer.	Brian George
Ali "Lightning" Bombay	Vehicle / Mask / Description; Bullet / Vortex / A blue and white racing Suzuki motorcycle that turns into a drone. First show appearance is episode 68. His mask is called Vortex that creates controlled whirlwinds. Bullet was renamed Bandit for its European release.	Brian George

== V.E.N.O.M. members and their vehicles ==
V.E.N.O.M. (short for Vicious Evil Network Of Mayhem) is a criminal organization against which M.A.S.K. fights. V.E.N.O.M.'s primary goal was obtaining money through either robbery, extortion, counterfeiting, and kidnapping, or attempting to steal historical artifacts. Unlike the M.A.S.K. agents, V.E.N.O.M. personnel were not depicted in the animated series as holding any type of regular employment between assignments since most of them are convicted criminals.

In addition to some occasional unnamed grunts, among its known members in order of appearance are:

Character	Description	Voice performer
Miles "Wolf" Mayhem	Miles Mayhem is the leader of V.E.N.O.M. and the main villain of the M.A.S.K. franchise. In the comics, he betrayed the original M.A.S.K. team by killing Matt's brother Andy and stole half of the masks for his evil purposes, establishing V.E.N.O.M. in the process while becoming an arms dealer. Though V.E.N.O.M.'s origins are ambiguous in the animated series, Mayhem's backstory is the same as in the comics in that he is a co-founder of the M.A.S.K. organization before a rift occurred between him and Matt. Mayhem is described on the filecard of a 2008 crossover "Specialist Trakker" action figure for the G.I. Joe toyline as an operative for Cobra with V.E.N.O.M. serving as a technology and weapons research branch and mercenary army.	Brendan McKane
Miles "Wolf" Mayhem	Vehicle / Mask / Description; Switchblade / Viper / An indigo high-tech helicopter with cerise canopy glass, it transforms into a jet plane. First show appearance is episode 1. His mask Viper spits a corrosive poison.; Outlaw / Python / A black Mack tanker truck (midnight blue in the cartoon) that transforms into an assault installation and mobile command center. First show appearance is episode 47. His mask Python fires a gripping wire.; Venom's Revenge / Ripper / An assault jet pack, his Ripper mask fires a beam of metal-shredding energy.; Buzzard / Flexor / A Formula One car that splits into a drone-controlled jet fighter and two smaller assault dragsters that are controlled by Miles and his brother Maximus. First show appearance is episode 67. His Flexor mask fires a flexible energy shield.; Wolfbeast / New Viper / A blue Corvette Stingray which splits into a tank and gunner's shuttle. His mask is New Viper which also projects his holographic clone.	Brendan McKane
Sly "Wrecker" Rax	A sunglasses-wearing mercenary whose has weapons expert and espionage intellect as his skill sets, Rax is often depicted in the animated series as lazy and falling asleep on the job much to the dismay of his teammates. In addition, Sly is shown to dislike it when his fellow V.E.N.O.M. members suck up to Miles Mayhem. In the 1987 nine-issue comic series by DC Comics, he has ambitions of replacing Miles Mayhem as V.E.N.O.M.'s leader or at least seeking a larger role in his schemes.	Mark Halloran
Sly "Wrecker" Rax	Vehicle / Mask / Description; Piranha / Stiletto / A purple BMW motorcycle with a releasable sidecar that doubles as a single-occupant submarine. First show appearance is episode 1. His Stiletto mask fires short armor-piercing harpoons from its chestplate.; Pitstop Catapult / Sawblade / A fueling station that becomes an armored catapulting grinder. He uses the Sawblade mask that fires slashing blades.	Mark Halloran
Cliff "Blaster" Dagger	An eyepatch-wearing and slow-witted mercenary/convicted arsonist who has demolitions expert and bare-knuckle boxing as his skill sets.	Mark Halloran
Cliff "Blaster" Dagger	Vehicle / Mask / Description; Jackhammer / Torch / A black Ford Bronco that turns into an assault vehicle equipped with heavy firepower. First show appearance is episode 1. His Torch mask acts as a flamethrower.; Thunderball / New Torch / An anti-aircraft gun disguised as a holding tank tower, this toy was intended as part of the 1987-88 Split Seconds series but was never released.	Mark Halloran
Vanessa Warfield	Vanessa Warfield is V.E.N.O.M.'s femme fatale who is the self-proclaimed "Queen of Espionage". She becomes the unofficial team leader by the start of the second season of the animated series. In the 44th episode of the first season "Riddle of the Raven Master", Vanessa is shown to display affection to her trained ravens. Warfield falls for M.A.S.K. agent Brad Turner in the series finale "Cliff Hanger".	Sharon Noble
Vanessa Warfield	Vehicle / Mask / Description; Manta / Whip / A purple Nissan 300ZX Z31 that converts into an assault jet, first show appearance is episode 1 (in the intro). Her Whip mask emits long, powerful strands of electronic energy.	Sharon Noble
Bruno "Mad Dog" Sheppard	A convicted kidnapper with an orange Mohawk hairstyle and multiple tattoos who has hand-to-hand combat and master of disguise as his skill set, he is considered the toughest and most dangerous V.E.N.O.M. agent.	Doug Stone
Bruno "Mad Dog" Sheppard	Vehicle / Mask / Description; Stinger / Magna-Beam / An orange Pontiac GTO that transforms into a tank with a metal claw hidden in the trunk, first show appearance is episode 43. His Magna-Beam mask has magnetic abilities where it can attract, repel or rip apart metal objects. Stinger was referred to as "Scorpion" in several episodes.; Racing Arena / Magna-Beam / An assault pack that works in combination with the Magna-Beam mask.; Barracuda / New Magna-Beam / A yellow motorcycle that turns into a rocket glider and armed booster cycle. The New Magna-Beam mask produces his holographic double. The European release of Barracuda was named "Jackal".	Doug Stone
Floyd "Birdman" Malloy	The former leader of a biker gang, a former IRS field auditor, and convicted forgery artist who is an expert street fighter.	Brendan McKane
Floyd "Birdman" Malloy	Vehicle / Mask / Description; Vampire / Buckshot / A red Honda touring cycle that transforms into a single-pilot turbo jet, first show appearance is episode 45. Buckshot is his open-top mask that launches bearing balls.; Vandal / New Buckshot / A purple and yellow front-end loader which separates into a recon aircraft and a tank. Here, he uses the New Buckshot mask to make his holographic double.	Brendan McKane
Nash "Goon" Gorey	A meek and bespectacled hacker and surveillance whiz, he is a simpering henchman who is overly eager to please Miles Mayhem much to the dismay of Sly Rax. Gorey is depicted in the 1985 DC Comics series as a new recruit for M.A.S.K. who is ultimately revealed to be a mole working for V.E.N.O.M. First show appearance is episode 47.	Doug Stone
Nash "Goon" Gorey	Vehicle / Mask / Description; Outlaw / Powerhouse / Gorey serves as its co-pilot with Mayhem (though in the animated series, Gorey frequently operates Outlaw alone, while Mayhem operates Switchblade). His Powerhouse mask (called Samson in several episodes of the animated series) allows him to multiply his strength.	Doug Stone
Lester "Lizard" Sludge	A smarmy henchman with an indeterminate background, a red flattop hairstyle, sunglasses, and an annoying signature cackle who acts out of his own motivation, he appeared in the racing-themed episodes of the second season. Sludge nearly succeeds in killing Matt Trakker in the second episode of the second season titled "When Eagles Dare".	Brian George
Lester "Lizard" Sludge	Vehicle / Mask / Description; Iguana / Mudslinger / A black Suzuki quad bike that turns into a mobile buzz saw platform, first show appearance is episode 66. His Mudslinger mask shoots mud at his enemies.	Brian George
Maximus "Maxie" Mayhem	Maximus Mayhem is the weak-willed twin brother of Miles Mayhem who calls him "Maxie" as a term of endearment. Maximus wears a monocle over his left eye and has an indeterminate background. He is mainly featured in the racing-themed episodes of the second season.	Doug Stone
Maximus "Maxie" Mayhem	Vehicle / Mask / Description; Buzzard / Deep Freeze / He operates one of two assault dragsters that detach from the main vehicle. He uses the mask Deep Freeze that fires a cold energy ray.	Doug Stone

== Other toys ==
Name
Description
Boulder Hill
The M.A.S.K. team's headquarters is an unassuming gas station in the fictional location of Boulder Hill, Nevada, with agent Buddie Hawks serving as its lone attendant. It can transform into an armed fortress to defend itself, while containing a secret cargo plane used to transport M.A.S.K. vehicles to other locations. The Boulder Hill playset came with Alex Sector and Buddie Hawks action figures.
Laser Command
A playset which, like the Split Seconds toys, never appeared in the show, although it was given a spotlight in a UK comic strip story. The set consisted of two toys:

Vehicle	Mask	Description
Hornet	Lasertron	A M.A.S.K. packing crate that opened to reveal an aerial attack vehicle. The toy came with a Matt Trakker figure and the Lasertron mask (a redress of the Ultra-Flash mask from Rhino).
Ratfang	Raynet	A V.E.N.O.M. truck with limited transforming capabilities, its exhausts swung out to form side cannons. Its doors, wheels and hood burst apart when triggered by infrared beams fired from Hornet. The toy was a blue redeco of Firecracker fitted with a camper shell, and came with a Miles Mayhem action figure.
