= Solo (1996 film) =

- Promotional release poster
- Directed by: Norberto Barba
- Screenplay by: David L. Corley
- Based on: Weapon by Robert Mason
- Produced by: Joseph Newton Cohen; John Flock
- Starring: Mario Van Peebles; William Sadler; Adrien Brody; Barry Corbin
- Cinematography: Christopher Walling
- Edited by: Scott Conrad
- Music by: Christopher Franke
- Production company: Triumph Films
- Distributed by: Sony Pictures Releasing
- Release date: August 23, 1996 (United States)
- Running time: 94 minutes
- Country: United States
- Language: English
- Budget: $19 million
- Box office: $5.1 million

Solo is a 1996 American science fiction action film directed by Norberto Barba, and starring Mario Van Peebles, William Sadler, Adrien Brody, Barry Corbin and Demián Bichir. The film was based on the 1989 novel Weapon by Robert Mason, and was adapted into a screenplay by David L. Corley for Columbia/TriStar Pictures.

It was released by Triumph Films on August 23, 1996, and grossed $5.1 million at the box office.

== Plot ==
Solo is an android designed as a military killing machine. He is sent to Central America by General Haynes to battle guerrilla insurgents, but a flaw develops in his programming, and he develops a conscience and compassion. His developers try to take him back for deprogramming, but he flees to the jungle in a helicopter. His main energy supply was damaged during the first mission, forcing him to switch to his much less powerful secondary power. He joins a small village community that is under constant threat from guerilla attackers, and he protects them in exchange for use of their electric generator (they previously used it to power a television). There, he learns to 'bluff' from a child that befriends him, Miguel.

Solo helps the villagers drive off local Warlord Rio and his small army, but the combat is detected by a military satellite. A black ops team is sent to recover or destroy Solo, while they ally with Rio. The highly sadistic black ops leader, Colonel Frank Madden, who has an intense hatred for Solo as he sees Solo renders the Black Ops members like him out of job, brings in Dr. Bill Stewart, Solo's creator, as a lure, leaving the man mortally wounded but Solo survives. Having occupied the village, the militiamen and black ops team attempt to kill Solo, but he manages to kill them.

Rio is betrayed by Madden, who tries to kill Solo with an automatic grenade launcher. Solo is able to fight Madden in hand-to-hand combat and non-fatally break his spine. Suddenly a helicopter delivers a more powerful version of the android, which is armed with a multi-barreled gun and has Madden's face. The MkII kills Madden and proceeds to hunt down Solo. Solo rescues the villagers and destroys the MkII android, using his acquired bluffing skills. After the temple, the two androids fought in collapses, causing the military to pull out believing both units are destroyed and unrecoverable, Miguel mourns Solo believing he was destroyed by cave-in, but Miguel starts to hear Solo, laughing, as he knows he has earned his freedom.

== Cast ==
- Mario Van Peebles as Solo
- William Sadler as Colonel Frank Madden / Improved Solo
- Adrien Brody as Dr. Bill Stewart
- Barry Corbin as General Clyde Haynes
- Demián Bichir as Rio
- Jaime Gomez as Sergeant Lorenzo
- Seidy López as Agela
- Abraham Verduzco as Miguel
- Joaquín Garrido as Vasquez
- Jaime P. Gomez as Sgt. Lorenzo

== Production ==
At one point, producer Lawrence Gordon had initially purchased the rights to Weapon along with options on other books penned by Robert Mason.

Following his work directing Panther, Mario Van Peebles was looking for a project that would provide him a complex character to play and felt Solo with its depictions of indigenous people under the threat of superior technology provided opportunity to do so. The film was shot entirely in Puerto Vallarta. Shooting took place from May through July 1995.

== Release ==
Solo was theatrically released in the United States on August 23, 1996. The film received a home video release on February 18, 1997.

== Reception ==
=== Critical response ===
Solo was panned by critics. On the review aggregator website Rotten Tomatoes, 8% of 36 critics' reviews are positive, with an average rating of 3.8/10. The website's consensus reads: "Featuring hammy performances and bland characters, Solo is an all too straightforward actioner that's both predictable and instantly forgettable."
