= List of people from Utah =

State flag of Utah

Location of Utah in the United States

The following is a list of prominent people who were born in the U.S. state of Utah, live in Utah, or for whom Utah is a significant part of their identity.

== A ==
- Maurice Abravanel – music director of the Utah Symphony for over 30 years
- Maude Adams – Broadway stage actress of late 19th and early 20th centuries, noted for title role in Peter Pan
- Florence E. Allen – first woman to serve on a state Supreme Court, second to serve as a federal judge
- Quinn Allman – guitarist for The Used
- John Amaechi – American-English NBA player for the Utah Jazz (2001–2003), sports broadcaster, political activist
- Rocky Anderson – former mayor of Salt Lake City
- David Archuleta – singer-songwriter, runner-up on the seventh season of American Idol
- Leonard J. Arrington – historian
- Hal Ashby – director; films include Being There, The Last Detail, Harold and Maude

== B ==
- Simon Bamberger – first Democratic governor of Utah; only Jewish governor of Utah
- Dean Baker (born 1958) – macroeconomist
- Lee Barnes (1906–1970) – pole vaulter, gold medalist in 1924 Olympics
- Roseanne Barr – comedian, television actress, writer, talk-show host
- Earl W. Bascom (1906–1995) – rodeo champion, inventor, artist, sculptor, Utah Sports Hall of Fame inductee
- Bruce Bastian – computer programmer, co-founder of WordPerfect company, philanthropist, on the board of directors of the Human Rights Campaign
- Zane Beadles – lineman for the Jacksonville Jaguars
- Linda Bement (1942–2018) – Miss USA and Miss Universe 1960
- Robert Foster "Bob" Bennett – Republican United States senator from Utah
- Ezra Taft Benson – 13th president of the Church of Jesus Christ of Latter-day Saints, 1985–1994; United States secretary of agriculture
- Jaime Bergman – actress, model, 1999 Playboy Playmate
- Arnie Beyeler – first base coach for the Boston Red Sox
- Don Bluth (born 1937) – animator
- Frank Borzage – film director and actor
- Reva Beck Bosone – Utah's first female member of Congress
- Elaine Bradley – musician; member of rock band Neon Trees
- Shawn Bradley – former NBA center, one of the tallest players in NBA history
- Stewart Bradley – linebacker for the Philadelphia Eagles
- Juanita Brooks – historian and author
- John Moses Browning (1855–1926) – firearms designer
- Val Browning (1895–1994) – business magnate, philanthropist, and gun innovator
- John Buck (born 1980) – catcher for the Miami Marlins
- Ted Bundy – serial killer who attended the S. J. Quinney College of Law (not born in Utah, but lived there)
- Nolan Bushnell (born 1943) – video game designer, founder of Atari and Chuck E. Cheese
- Jerry Buss (1933–2013) – businessman, real estate investor and chemist, owned the Los Angeles Lakers

== C ==
- Ben Cahoon – slotback for the CFL's Montreal Alouettes, member of two Grey Cup championship teams in 2002 and 2009
- Mario Capecchi (born 1939) – recipient, Nobel Prize in Physiology or Medicine, 2007
- Orson Scott Card (born 1951) – science fiction author
- Kate B. Carter (1891–1976) – writer and historian
- Neal Cassady – writer; major figure of the Beat Generation of the 1950s and the psychedelic and counterculture movements of the 1960s; inspiration for the character Dean Moriarty in Jack Kerouac's novel On the Road
- Butch Cassidy (1866 – c. 1908) – outlaw, born Robert LeRoy Parker in Beaver, Utah
- Stephen Covey (1932–2012) – author, The Seven Habits of Highly Effective People
- Reed Cowan (born 1972) – television news anchor, philanthropist, and documentary filmmaker
- Melvin A. Cook (1911–2000) – explosives expert, chemist
- Chris Cooley (born 1982) – NFL tight end
- James Cowser (born 1990) – NFL outside linebacker
- Chandler Cox (born 1996) – NFL fullback

== D ==
- Matthew Davis – actor, The Vampire Diaries, What About Brian, Legally Blonde
- Laraine Day – actress, Foreign Correspondent, Mr. Lucky, The High and the Mighty
- Jordan Devey – offensive guard for the San Francisco 49ers
- Paul W. Draper – anthropologist, mentalist, educator
- Jack Dreyer – MLB pitcher for the Los Angeles Dodgers
- Christine M. Durham – chief justice of the Utah Supreme Court since 2002

== E ==
- David Eccles – industrialist
- Marriner Eccles – banker, economist, chairman of the Federal Reserve during Roosevelt and Truman administrations
- Spencer Eccles – bank executive for First Security and Wells Fargo
- Lily Eskelsen García – vice president of National Education Association
- Richard Paul Evans – author, known for novel The Christmas Box
- Henry Eyring – theoretical chemist who proposed theories on which future Nobel Prize winners based their work

== F ==
- Philo T. Farnsworth (1906–1971) – inventor of the electronic television
- John D. Fitzgerald – author of The Great Brain series of children's books and Papa Married a Mormon
- John F. Fitzpatrick – publisher of The Salt Lake Tribune 1924–1960
- Harvey Fletcher – physicist, invented the hearing aid and audiometer; called "the father of stereophonic sound"
- Brandon Flowers – singer for the rock band The Killers
- Jim Fosgate – inventor of first car amplifier, Dolby Pro Logic II surround sound, founder of Rockford Fosgate electronics
- Jimmer Fredette – professional basketball player
- Patrick Fugit (born 1982) – actor, known for lead role of Cameron Crowe's film Almost Famous
- Gene Fullmer (1931–2015) – middleweight boxer and world champion

== G ==
- John W. Gallivan – publisher of The Salt Lake Tribune, 1960–1984
- Kendall D. Garff – founder of Ken Garff Automotive Group
- Jake Garn – former U.S. senator and astronaut, the first member of Congress in space
- Anthony Geary – actor in several daytime television series
- John Gilbert – silent film star
- Tyler Glenn – musician; member of rock band Neon Trees
- Jared Goldberg (born 1991) – Olympic skier
- Robert Gore – co-inventor of Gore-Tex fabrics
- Wilbert L. Gore – co-inventor of Gore-Tex fabrics
- Heber J. Grant (1856–1945) – 7th president of the Church of Jesus Christ of Latter-day Saints
- Tom Green – Mormon fundamentalist and practicer of plural marriage
- Riley Griffiths – actor, known for Super 8
- Jesse Grupper (born 1997) – Olympic rock climber

== H ==
- Gregg Hale – guitarist for British band Spiritualized
- Tracy Hall (1919–2008) – scientist
- Jacob Hamblin – peace maker with Native Americans
- Orrin Hatch (1934–2022) – long-time U.S. senator from Utah since 1977
- Dan Hausel (born 1949) – martial-arts grandmaster, exploration geologist and author
- Stanley Havili (born 1987) – fullback for the Philadelphia Eagles
- Colin Haynie (born 2004/2005) – alleged mass shooter
- Katherine Heigl – actress (Grey's Anatomy, 27 Dresses)
- Gary R. Herbert (born 1947) – governor of Utah
- Jared and Jerusha Hess (born 1979, 1980) – filmmakers (Napoleon Dynamite)
- Tracy Hickman – writer, co-creator of the Dungeons & Dragons campaign setting Dragonlance and associated novels
- Esther Hicks – inspirational speaker and best-selling author
- Chelsie Hightower – professional ballroom dancer on So You Think You Can Dance and Dancing with the Stars
- Joe Hill – socialist, radical labor activist, and member of the Industrial Workers of the World
- Gordon B. Hinckley (1910–2008) – 15th president of the Church of Jesus Christ of Latter-day Saints, 1995–2008
- Allison Holker – jazz dancer
- Derek Hough and Julianne Hough – professional ballroom dancers on Dancing with the Stars
- Jeph Howard (born 1979) – bassist for The Used
- Jon Huntsman Jr. (born 1960) – governor of Utah 2005–2009; ambassador to the People's Republic of China
- Jon Huntsman Sr. – businessman, philanthropist, founder of Huntsman Corporation

== I ==
- Brian Ibbott – creator of the Coverville podcast

== J ==
- Daniel C. Jackling – founded the Utah Copper Co. in 1903, starting what became the world's largest open-pit mine
- Ken Jennings – 74-time Jeopardy! champion
- Jewel (born Jewel Kilcher, 1974) – singer-songwriter, guitarist, actress, and poet
- Scott Johnson – creator of Extralife webcomic and podcast network Frogpants Studios
- Megan Joy – singer, American Idol Season 8 finalist

== K ==
- Kanosh – Chief, Pahvant band of the Ute Tribe
- Thomas Kearns – U.S. senator from Utah (1901–1905), owned the Silver King Coalition Mine in Park City and the Salt Lake Tribune, Utah's largest newspaper
- Bryan Kehl – linebacker for the Washington Redskins
- Brett Keisel – defensive end for the Pittsburgh Steelers
- David M. Kennedy (1905–1996) – treasury secretary under President Nixon
- Spencer W. Kimball – 12th president of the Church of Jesus Christ of Latter-day Saints; LDS president who ended the ban on priesthood for African-Americans in 1978
- John F. Kinney – chief justice of the Utah Territory Supreme Court, 1853–1857, and the Territory of Utah's Delegate in the House of Representatives of the 38th Congress
- Raymond Knight – rodeo organizer, son of mining magnate Jesse Knight
- Steve Konowalchuk – NHL forward for Washington Capitals and Colorado Avalanche
- Paul Kruger – linebacker for Cleveland Browns

== L ==
- Carnell Lake (born 1967) – former NFL professional football player, football coach
- Paul Langton – actor
- Joi Lansing – model, actress
- LeafyIsHere – YouTuber
- Mike Leavitt – former governor of Utah, secretary of Health and Human Services
- Harold B. Lee – 11th president of the Church of Jesus Christ of Latter-day Saints
- John D. Lee – early LDS Church leader, the only man convicted in the Mountain Meadows massacre
- Trevor Lewis – forward for NHL's Los Angeles Kings
- Don L. Lind – astronaut
- Mike Lookinland – actor
- Star Lotulelei – defensive tackle for the Carolina Panthers
- Brandon Lyon – relief pitcher for MLB's Toronto Blue Jays

== M ==
- Maddox – Internet satirist and author of The Best Page in the Universe and The Alphabet of Manliness
- Karl Malone – professional basketball player (retired); two-time NBA MVP and Hall of Famer
- John Willard Marriott – founder of worldwide hotel business Marriott International, Inc.
- Mark Maryboy – politician and a former Navajo Nation Council Delegate
- Daya Mata – president of Self-Realization Fellowship for 55+ years
- Scott M. Matheson – governor of Utah
- Ned Mathews – running back for Detroit Lions and Boston Yanks
- Bert McCracken – lead singer of the band The Used
- Roger I. McDonough – chief justice of the Utah Supreme Court, 1947–1948 and 1954–1959
- David O. McKay – 9th president of the Church of Jesus Christ of Latter-day Saints
- James B. McKean – congressman, chief justice of the Utah Territory Supreme Court, 1870–1875
- Jim McMahon – NFL football player (retired); businessman; motivational speaker
- Evan Mecham – 17th governor of Arizona
- Kieth Merrill – Academy Award-winning producer and director
- Johnny Miller – former professional golfer, won 25 PGA Tour events, current golf analyst for NBC Sports
- Larry H. Miller (1944–2009) – businessman, philanthropist, owner of Utah Jazz basketball team
- Gerald R. Molen – Academy Award-winning film producer
- Thomas S. Monson – president of the Church of Jesus Christ of Latter-day Saints
- Ted Moss – three-term Democratic senator from Utah
- Barry Mower – businessperson, owner of Lifetime Products
- Brandon Mull – best-selling author

== N ==
- Jim Nantz – CBS Sports anchor
- David Neeleman – co-founder JetBlue
- Russell M. Nelson – 17th president of the Church of Jesus Christ of Latter-day Saints
- Haloti Ngata – defensive end for the Baltimore Ravens
- Claude Nowell (1944–2008) – founder of Summum religion and philosophy

== O ==
- Dallin H. Oaks – lawyer, jurist, Apostle of the Church of Jesus Christ of Latter-day Saints
- Darcy Olsen – president and chief executive officer of the Goldwater Institute
- Merlin Olsen (1940–2010) – former NFL football player, actor on Little House on the Prairie and star of NBC's Father Murphy
- The Osmonds – family music group
  - Alan Osmond (born 1949) – singer
  - Donny Osmond (born 1957) – singer, actor, television host
  - Jay Osmond (born 1955) – singer
  - Jimmy Osmond (born 1963) – singer, actor, businessman
  - Marie Osmond (born 1959) – singer, actress, television host
  - Merrill Osmond (born 1953) – singer
  - Wayne Osmond (born 1951) – singer
- Wayne Owens (1937–2002) – attorney, U.S. congressman from Utah

== P ==
- Erik Pears (born 1982) – offensive tackle for the San Francisco 49ers
- Utah Phillips (1935–2008) – folk singer, poet, and labor organizer
- Dorothy Poynton (1915–1995) – diver, two-time Olympic gold medalist
- Ivy Baker Priest (1905–1976) – United States secretary of the treasury 1953–61
- Pat Priest (born 1936) – actress, The Munsters

== R ==
- Melba Rae – actress, Search for Tomorrow
- Natacha Rambova – costume and set designer; Egyptologist
- Cal Rampton – Utah governor, 1965–1977; won three terms running as a Democrat
- Carmen Rasmusen (born 1985) – contestant on American Idol 2
- Dallas Reynolds – offensive lineman for the New York Giants
- Dan Reynolds – lead singer for the band Imagine Dragons
- Gary Ridgway – serial killer known as the Green River Killer
- Amanda Righetti – actress, The Mentalist, North Shore, Reunion
- Mitt Romney – politician, businessman, former governor of Massachusetts (2003–2007), 2012 Republican nominee for president, and United States senator from Utah (2019–2024)
- Karl Rove – political advisor to President George W. Bush
- Ron Rydalch – defensive lineman for the Chicago Bears

== S ==
- Sagwitch – Northern Shoshone chieftain (1822–1887)
- Matt Salmon – U.S. representative from Arizona
- Kyle Sampson – former chief of staff and counselor for United States Attorney General Alberto Gonzales
- Brandon Sanderson – author, selected to complete Robert Jordan's fantasy series The Wheel of Time
- Cael Sanderson – wrestler from Heber City, Utah, gold medalist in the 2004 Summer Olympics
- Harold Schindler (1929–1998) – Utah historian
- Dalton Schultz – tight end for the Dallas Cowboys
- Byron Scott – NBA shooting guard; head coach for the New Jersey Nets, New Orleans Hornets, and Cleveland Cavaliers
- Brent Scowcroft – National Security Advisor to presidents Gerald Ford and George H. W. Bush
- Ryan Seaman – drummer in the rock band Falling in Reverse
- Jerry Sloan – basketball player, Hall of Fame head coach for the Utah Jazz; longest-tenured coach in American professional sports
- Elizabeth Smart – kidnapped as a girl from her bedroom in Salt Lake City in 2002; child safety activist
- George Albert Smith – 8th president of the Church of Jesus Christ of Latter-day Saints
- Joseph Fielding Smith – 10th president of the Church of Jesus Christ of Latter-day Saints
- Lucky Blue Smith (born 1998) – model and drummer
- Reed Smoot – U.S. senator, served almost thirty years in Congress, ten as chairman of the Finance Committee
- Franklin Spalding – Episcopal bishop of Utah and leader on the first proven ascent of the Grand Teton
- Sril – artist
- Wallace Stegner – historian, novelist, short story writer, and environmentalist
- Branden Steineckert – former drummer of The Used, drummer for Rancid
- Stanley Smith Stevens – psychologist; founded Harvard's Psycho-Acoustic Laboratory; credited with Stevens' power law
- John Stockton – Hall of Fame point guard for the Utah Jazz, holds the NBA records for career assists and steals
- Picabo Street – champion alpine ski racer with the U.S. Ski Team
- Xavier Su'a-Filo – guard for the Dallas Cowboys
- Bruce Summerhays – professional golfer; mission president for the Church of Jesus Christ of Latter-day Saints
- Jane Summerhays – actress
- George Sutherland – English-born American jurist and political figure; Associate Justice of the Supreme Court, 1922–1938
- Kelly Sweet – adult contemporary singer
- May Swenson (1913–1989) – poet

== T ==
- Naufahu Tahi – former NFL fullback
- Mitch Talbot – pitcher for the Samsung Lions
- Chrissy Teigen – model for the Sports Illustrated Swimsuit Issue
- Kip Thorne – theoretical physicist
- D. J. Tialavea – tight end for the Atlanta Falcons
- Will Tukuafu – fullback for the Seattle Seahawks

== U ==
- Harvey Unga – running back for the Chicago Bears
- Brendon Urie – singer-songwriter, frontman of Panic! at the Disco

== V ==
- Craig Venter – biotechnologist, biochemist, geneticist, and entrepreneur
- Zach Vigil – linebacker for the Miami Dolphins

== W ==
- Wakara – Native American; leader of the Timpanogos tribe
- Olene S. Walker – governor
- Tom Wallisch – skier
- John Warnock – co-founder of Adobe Systems Inc.
- Dallon Weekes – musician, singer-songwriter; former bassist of rock band Panic! at the Disco and current frontman of indie pop project I Dont Know How but They Found Me
- Mike Weir – professional golfer
- Rhyan White – Olympic swimmer
- Willie Wilkin – professional football player
- Terry Tempest Williams – author, environmentalist
- Marie Windsor – actress
- Mary Elizabeth Winstead – actress, Live Free or Die Hard
- Dave Wolverton – author
- James Woods – film, stage and television actor
- David Wright – cyclist, stage winner in all three grand tours, yellow jersey holder, national time trial champion

== Y ==
- Brigham Young – 2nd president of the Church of Jesus Christ of Latter-day Saints
- Bryan Young – filmmaker and author
- Loretta Young – film actress and television star
- Mahonri Young – sculptor and artist
- Steve Young – Hall of Fame quarterback for the San Francisco 49ers, NFL's Most Valuable Player 1992 and 1994

== Z ==
- Charles S. Zane – chief justice of the Utah Territory Supreme Court (1884–1888), and of the Utah Supreme Court (1896–1899)
- Michael David Zimmerman – sensei; chief justice of the Utah Supreme Court, 1994–1998

== See also ==
By educational institution affiliation

- List of Brigham Young University alumni
- List of Brigham Young University faculty
- List of University of Utah people
- List of Utah State University alumni
- List of Utah State University faculty

By governmental office

- List of governors of Utah
- List of justices of the Utah Supreme Court
- List of United States representatives from Utah
- List of United States senators from Utah

By location

- List of people from Salt Lake City

By occupation

- List of Utah artists
- List of Utah suffragists
- List of Utah writers

By religious affiliation

- List of Latter Day Saints
