= Film Sack =

Podcast about film and television

- Filmsack Logo

Presentation
- Hosted by: Scott Johnson; Brian Ibbott; Brian Dunaway; Randy Jordan
- Genre: Films
- Language: English
- Updates: Weekly
- Length: 60 to 75 minutes

Production
- Audio format: MP3

Publication
- Original release: October 30, 2009
- Provider: FrogPants Studios Network

Film Sack is a weekly podcast focused on film and television created by Scott Johnson on the FrogPants Studios Network. The show was announced on October 27, 2009, with the first episode to be released October 30. Hosted by Scott Johnson, Brian Ibbott, Brian Dunaway, and Randy Jordan, it features roundtable discussions on different films and occasional television episodes. As the hosts encourage their audience to watch the material prior to the episode, they attempt to focus on items available via streaming media, primarily Netflix. This also facilitates the availability of the film to all four hosts at the same time. Generally targeting films that fall more into the cult/b-film/box office failure category, the podcast maintains its tagline, "Mining the depths of film entertainment for all mankind." In 2011 and 2013, Film Sack won People's Choice Podcast Awards in the film category. The podcast is also hosted on iTunes.

== Panelists ==
The podcast is hosted by Scott Johnson, creator of FrogPants Studios and several other shows, including ExtraLife Radio. Co-hosts include frequent collaborators Brian Ibbott from Coverville, Brian Dunaway from Comics Coast to Coast, and Randy Jordan (formerly of The Instance).

== Format ==
=== Regular episodes ===
Film Sack episodes are about one hour long. Starting with a sound bite from the item being covered and a greeting by the hosts, a synopsis of the film will be read by voice-over actor Scott Fletcher. The panelists cover the content of the film or television episode, often discussing trivia regarding the film. If an actor or director has been covered in an earlier episode, this is usually noted. The hosts will occasionally answer audience emails, or interact via chat with the audience listening to the show while it is being recorded. Johnson plays clips taken from the film, sometimes for comedic effect, or to demonstrate important parts of plot, or to point out bad editing. To conclude the podcast, the co-hosts will sum up their feelings of the film with a 140-character "Twitter post". A short selection of Scott Fletcher-voiced film quotes will follow. These are followed by Scott summing up what he learned from the film to comedic effect.

==== Segments/Bits ====
===== Tropes =====
Tropes are usually pointed out by the four hosts, such as sassy black female characters, wise-cracking sidekicks, false introductions, etc. These "trope alerts" are signified by the blaring "red alert" sound of Star Trek's Enterprise.

===== The Star Trek Connection =====
The panelists will frequently remark upon the connection between the Star Trek universe with the film being reviewed, in the manner of Six Degrees of Kevin Bacon. These connections are normally an actor that has appeared in any of the Star Trek series (from the Original Series to Enterprise) or any of the eleven films. Crew members of the films that have worked behind the scenes on both the film and in the Star Trek universe have also been mentioned. The hosts will occasionally read submissions from the podcast audience listing such connections.

===== The Checklist =====
Beginning with Episode 12, the host started "The Film Sack Checklist". These are film tropes that seem to occur on a regular basis with the films they have watched for the podcast. The checklist included at its introduction: bad guy with a theme song or sound, barfing, boobies, decapitations, stereotypes, urination/defecation, Kenobi archetype, animal/robot for comedy relief, and [a late addition], a cave that looks like a vagina.

===== The Awards =====
Beginning with episode 49, the Film Sack List became "The Film Sack Awards". The awards are given to cast and crew members of the film and sometimes the film itself. Awards given and discussed vary from episode to episode. Some awards are the "Wilford Brimley Moustache Award", the "Baby Ruth Bodily Function Award", and the "Sharon Stone Skin Award".

=== "Bonus Sacks" ===
Along with the regular episodes they produce, the Film Sack crew occasionally release "Bonus Sacks". These episodes are full-length commentary tracks that are meant to be played along with specific films as an alternate sound track. Similar to Mike Nelson's RiffTrax, the panelists will discuss the film as they watch it. Consequently, these episodes do not include the standard segments from the normal episodes.

== Reception ==
In 2011 and 2013, Film Sack won People's Choice Podcast Awards in the film category. The show has received positive and negative reviews among bloggers. In 2012 Timothy Wetzel wrote, "It is rare to find a podcast with four people have this good of chemistry and don't feel like they're trying to hog listening time over each other or don't talk enough. Plus, each episode is very entertaining and the comedy always has me in fits of giggles, sometimes in really awkward situations." Bill Thompson of Bill's Movie Emporium disapproved in 2011, writing "The show tries to bring humor into the mix, and it has really good audio quality. Yet I really didn't like Film Sack, and it's not that it was bad but it's that I found my time with the podcast completely forgettable." Thompson recommended, "Unsubscribe." The Filmwerk blog wrote that among film podcasts, "Film Sack is one of the better to choose from – and their choice of films can often help make them appeal more as they cover films that have notoriety but are not huge films". Filmmaker/blogger Phil Hobden recommended the podcast in 2011, as did blogger Craig Tisinger.

== See also ==
- List of film and television podcasts
