= Fausto Fernós =

Puerto Rican comedian

Fausto Fernós (born April 16, 1972) is a gay Puerto Rican podcaster, performance artist, and drag performer. He originated and co-hosts the Feast of Fun, an award-winning daily comedy talk show, with his partner Marc Felion. They were the first openly gay couple to win a People's Choice Podcast Award, which they have won five times (2006, 2007, 2008, 2009, 2011), and been nominated for the top prize of "People's Choice" six times in a row. Fernós currently resides in Chicago, Illinois.

== Biography ==
=== Early life ===
Fausto Fernós was born in Santurce, Puerto Rico, in 1972. He is the son of Puerto Rican architect Gonzalo Fernós-López and of the educator Patricia Fernós and is related to the first Puerto Rican cardiologist and its longest serving resident commissioner Antonio Fernós-Isern. Fernós was featured at age of 10 in the cooking section of El Nuevo Día newspaper about being one of the youngest boys studying the confectionery arts in Puerto Rico. The article focused mostly on the fact he and his sister Talia Fernós were being homeschooled by their mother.

=== Career ===
Fernós left San Juan and enrolled at the University of Texas at Austin at the age of 17 in 1989. There he studied performance art with Linda Montano. One of his class projects became a long running performance art experiment, SoftMen, a weekly improvised soap opera which involved fellow performers Chris Rincón and Andrew Johnson performing all the roles simultaneously, in the tradition of plays like The Mystery of Irma Vep.

In 1992 he began organizing musically oriented variety shows. They were originally titled Big Wig Revue. While the name suggested traditional cabaret, the goal was to redefine the genre.

In 1993 he started the performance art collective Performance Art Church, better known by its abbreviation Pe.A.Ch., with artists Kerthy Fix, Sheelah Murthy, Diana García, Scott Alton Dulaney and Carol Gilson. Most of their shows were short performances hosted by one of the performers tied around a central topic or theme. One show was a tribute to Lawrence Welk, while another was a discussion on the Superhero/Comic book genre.

Fernós started the Feast of Fools in Chicago in the spring of 1998 with the Chicago Radical Faeries as a fundraiser for the struggling Randolph Street Gallery.

In 2004, Fausto Fernós turned to audio and video blogging as a way to promote his unusual live musical variety shows. On February 8, 2005, the first Feast of Fools podcast was posted on his LiveJournal blog, FaustoFun. Within several weeks of posting shows, the audience for the online show grew beyond the size of the local Chicago audience. In 2009, the name of the show was changed from Feast of Fools to Feast of Fun to better reflect changes in the program's design and functionality.

Along with his partner Marc Felion, Fernós currently hosts the Feast of Fun podcast, one of the top rated talk show for an LGBTQI audiences on iTunes.
