= Feast of Fun =

LGBTQ+ podcast

- Hosts Fausto Fernós (left) and Marc Felion (right), artwork and logo by Fausto Fernós.
- Genre: Comedy

Cast and voices
- Hosted by: Fausto Fernós and Marc Felion

Publication
- Original release: February 2005
- Updates: Daily (Monday-Friday)
- License: CC-BY-NC-SA

Reception
- Ratings: 4.3

Related
- Website: http://www.feastoffun.com

The Feast of Fun podcast (formerly titled "Feast of Fools") is a Chicago, Illinois-based talk show hosted by Fausto Fernós and Marc Felion that showcases celebrity guests, artists, musicians, actors, and members of the LGBT community and those who support them. A typical program will include one or more of a number of features, including roundtable discussions, unusual news and social trends, LGBT issues, comedy, music, food and cocktail recipes, or interviews.

The Feast of Fun podcast continually ranks as the top-rated gay and lesbian podcast on iTunes and is frequently listed in the Top 100 list of Comedy podcasts. On average, the podcast is downloaded 30,000 times per week, making it the most downloaded GLBT podcast in the United States. On March 13, 2009, the producers changed the name of the show from "Feast of Fools" to "Feast of Fun" to better reflect changes in the program's design and functionality.

== Podcast ==
The Feast of Fools logo, with ".net" added, first appeared on the podcast's website in 2005 and subsequently appeared on numerous T-shirts and other promotional paraphernalia. This iteration of the logo is the second using the star as the main focus – the first did not include the ".net" and was used for the organization's live shows.

The first Feast of Fools Podcast was posted on Tuesday, February 8, 2005. It featured Fernós, Felion and former live show band leader (and recurring podcast contributor) Link Pinks. The name "Gay Fun Show" was added to the title of the Podcast to help prospective listeners easily discern what the show is about when searching podcast databases. As one of the earliest podcasts produced, the Podcast is recognized as a pioneer in the podcasting industry, and is responsible for a number of podcasting firsts, such as:

- First podcast hosted by an openly gay couple.
- First podcast to feature an HIV-positive person discussing living with AIDS.
- First podcast to use album art.
- First podcast to use show titles.

=== Show format ===
A typical Feast of Fun show consists of a round table discussion featuring unusual news stories, GLBT issues and social trends. Other shows may feature celebrity interviews (live or by phone), cocktail recipes, or "how to" sessions, such as "How drag queens lip sync and put on makeup". Until 2008, celebrities and other notable guests were frequently asked a series of "Breakdown" questions at the end of the show, such as "Describe yourself as a fancy shade of paint" and "What would you like to see Oprah doing in 5 years?" Since 2005, the Feast of Fools podcast has interviewed many celebrities, including Carol Channing, Cassandra Peterson (known for portraying "Elvira"), Margaret Cho, Kathy Griffin, Teri Garr, George Takei, John Waters and Bruce Vilanch. Occasionally, a show will open with an original cocktail recipe, usually given a name that pays tribute to that episode's special guest. Cocktail recipes feature unique ingredients or put a new spin on classics.

When not interviewing a special guest, Fernós and Felion are often joined by a rotating cast of frequent guests.

=== Music ===
Music is an integral part of the Feast of Fun podcast, and the show frequently interviews and features the music of up-and-coming talent, mostly unsigned or signed to independent record labels. Born out of necessity due to copyright and RIAA restrictions on the use of music on podcasts, this feature of the podcast has grown into an important avenue for emerging musicians to reach a previously untapped audience. Musicians whose music is featured on the Feast of Fun podcast realize increased sales on iTunes and Amazon.com.

== Awards ==
In 2006, Fausto Fernós was recognized as one of nine Chicago GLBTQ community leaders for his work on the Podcast by the Chicago Reader.

On September 29, 2006, the Podcast was awarded the 2006 "Best GLBT Podcast" by Podcast Awards/Podcast Connect, Inc. In November 2006, the Podcast was named "Best Podcast" for 2006 by Gay Bloggies, operated by Queerclick.com. Fausto Fernós and Marc Felion were named "Queers of the Year" by Time Out Chicago in the December 28, 2006 – January 3, 2007, issue for their work on the Feast of Fools podcast.

In 2007, the Podcast was nominated for both 2007 "Best GLBT Podcast" and the "People's Choice" overall award by Podcast Awards/Podcast Connect, Inc. On October 4, 2007, the Podcast was awarded 2007 "Best GLBT Podcast."

In 2008, the Podcast was again nominated for both "Best GLBT Podcast" and the "People's Choice" award by Podcast Awards/Podcast Connect, Inc. The Podcast was awarded 2008 "Best GLBT Podcast."

In 2009, the Podcast was awarded "Best Gay News Source" by the readers of the Chicago Reader. Also in 2009, the Podcast was again nominated for both "Best GLBT Podcast" and the "People's Choice" award by Podcast Awards/Podcast Connect, Inc. The Podcast was awarded 2009 "Best GLBT Podcast."

The podcast was nominated again in both "Best GLBT" and "People's Choice" categories in 2010 and 2011, winning the "Best GLBT" award in 2011. As of 2011, the Podcast has won the "Best GLBT" award a total of five times.

== History ==
The creator of the show, Fausto Fernós, was born and raised in San Juan, Puerto Rico. Fernós moved to Austin, Texas at age 17 to enroll in art school at the University of Texas at Austin. At the age of 18 he started the "SoftMen Show" above an alternative clothing store in Austin, Texas in the well-known music area known as Sixth Street. In 1994, Fernós created a successful Public-access television cable TV how entitled "El Chow De Faustina," which featured Fernós in drag interviewing artists and musicians from the local area. In 1995, the Austin Chronicle named the program as the "Best Cable Access Show" and featured Fernós on the cover of its publication alongside Texas Governor Ann Richards. In 1996, his solo performance work was featured in The Cleveland Performance Art Festival, a then-world-renowned festival of experimental art and live theater.

Fernós met his partner, Marc Felion in Chicago, Illinois in 1999, and together they developed Feast of Fools, a live theatrical variety show performed in various Chicago area venues. It featured music, dance, poetry, comedy and performance art strung together by a play that took place between acts. The name "Feast of Fools" was chosen by Fernós to pay tribute to Harry Hay, a gay activist from the 1970s, who felt gays should "embrace a certain frivolity." Hay envisioned a future where people felt free to express themselves fully and honestly, and therefore "act foolish." In September 2000, Fernós, identifiable around Chicago by his distinctive blue hair, gained notoriety as a 'fire-eating drag princess' and performed as part of the Radical Faeries of Chicago at Chicago's HotHouse. By April 2001, Fernós and Felion expanded their show at the Randolph Street Gallery to be a "performance art cabaret."

By 2005, Fernós—whose friend, video artist Kerthy Fix described as "a celebrity waiting for the technology to catch up with [him]"—and Felion aspired to take the show a step further by creating a cable access show; but at the same time, podcasting burst onto the scene with the promise of video podcasting in the near future. Taking a chance on the up-and-coming technology, they decided to embrace the new medium.

In 2007, the website was overhauled and two new podcasts were added: "Show Me Now," a video podcast; and "Mini Bites," which featured short skits and sound bites that users could download and use as cellular phone ringtones. The original audio podcast was named "Gay Fun Show" to distinguish itself from the other, newer shows. In addition, a Community Forum was started which allowed listeners to create personal profiles and share stories and information with each other. In 2008, the video podcast was re-launched and renamed "Video Player," which coincided with the launch of the Feast of Fools YouTube channel and another re-design of the main website.

In 2009, the name of the show was changed to "Feast of Fun" to better reflect the show's content, which focuses on odd news stories, food and drink recipes, music, comedy and irreverent humor. The show intends to include both gay and straight community members who are open to GLBT-related subjects and topics.

Also in 2009, a complete redesign of the website introduced new features, including "Fresh," which gives listeners the ability to contribute stories, photos and original articles freely; and "What's Hot," a summary of the most popular podcasts, topics and stories.

In July 2010, Feast of Fun featured interviews with a series of "Legendary Divas of Comedy": Cassandra Peterson, Carole Cook, Mink Stole and Carol Channing.

In 2011, Feast of Fun converted to a subscriber-based system, called "Feast of Fun Plus+". Subscribers gain access to all areas of the site, as well as additional benefits based on the level of membership chosen (Gold, Platinum or Diamond).
