= Mark Crislip =

American infectious disease doctor and skeptic (born 1957)

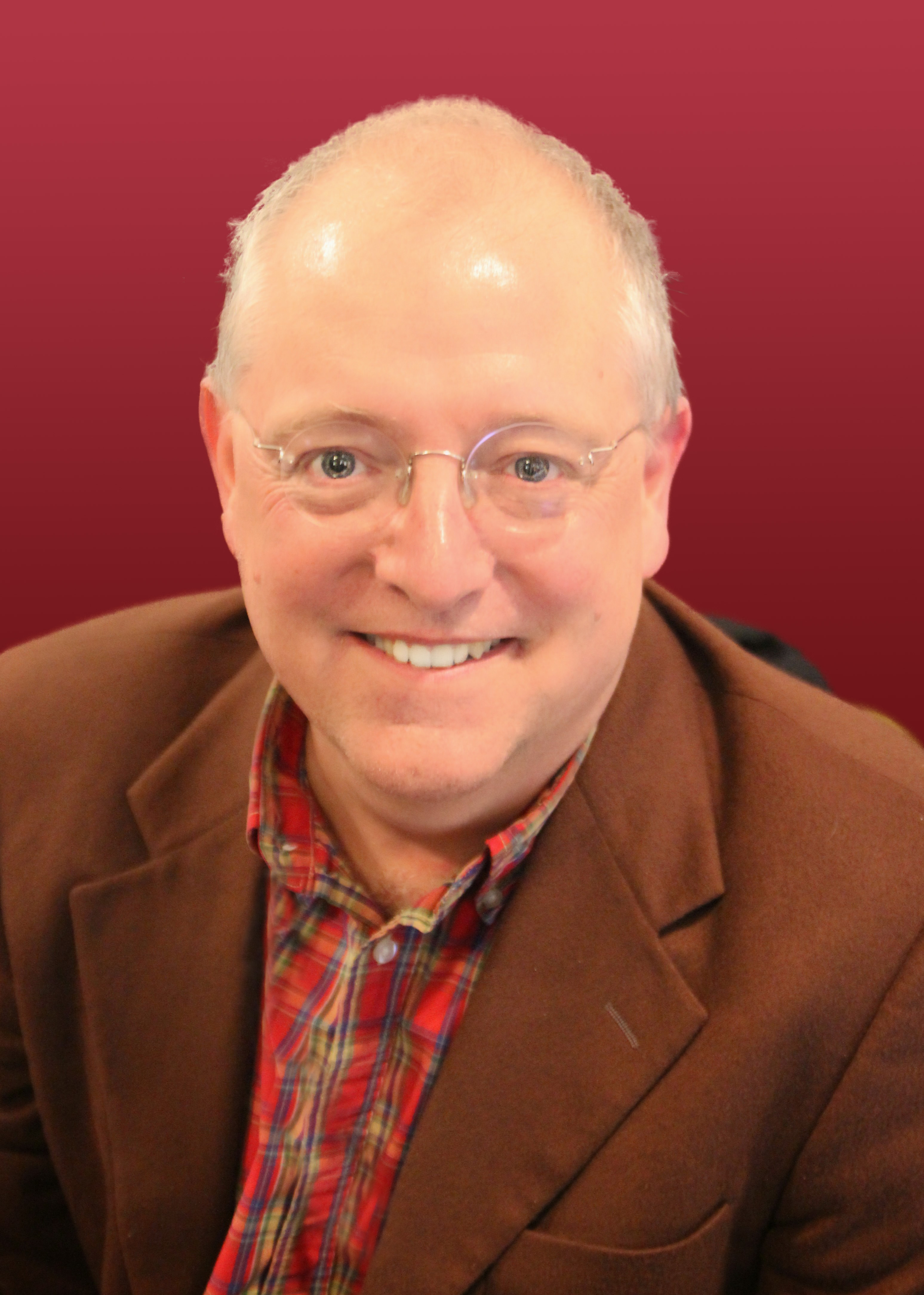
- Born: Mark Alden Crislip; April 25, 1957 (age 68); Cleveland, Ohio, U.S.
- Citizenship: US
- Education: University of Oregon (BS); Oregon Health & Science University (DM)
- Known for: Scientific skepticism
- Awards: Podcast Award
- Scientific career
- Fields: Infectious diseases
- Institutions: Adventist Medical Center, Legacy Good Samaritan Medical Center, Legacy Meridian Park Medical Center, Legacy Mount Hood Medical Center
- Website: edgydoc.com

Mark Alden Crislip (born April 25, 1957) is an infectious disease doctor in Portland, Oregon and former chief of infectious diseases at Legacy Health hospital system. Crislip has generated three podcasts, QuackCast, PusCast, and Gobbet o' Pus. A writer for medicine-related blogs, he has compiled his blog posts into several books. He co-founded the Society for Science-Based Medicine and served as president from 2013 to 2019.

== Biography ==
Crislip was born in Cleveland, Ohio. He attended the University of Oregon from 1979 to 1983, where he earned a Bachelor of Science degree in physics. He then earned a Doctor of Medicine (MD) degree at the Oregon Health & Science University School of Medicine in 1983. He completed an internship and residency at Hennepin County Medical Center in Minneapolis in 1986, followed by a fellowship at Harbor–UCLA Medical Center. He is currently a board-certified infectious disease specialist at several medical centers in the Portland area.

== Podcasts ==
Crislip was the producer and host of the podcasts QuackCast (2006–2019) and PusCast (2005–2021). His podcast Gobbet o' Pus was active as of 2022.

For each episode of QuackCast, Crislip delivered a monologue about a topic related to medicine, usually a critique of an alternative medicine practice or set of beliefs. He was inspired to create his own science-based medicine show after listening to the Slacker Astronomy podcast. The first episode of QuackCast was released on 5 May 2006. The podcast won three Podcast Awards in the Health/Fitness category, for the years 2009, 2010, and 2011.

Since 2009, Crislip has been producing the Gobbet o' Pus podcast which features short discussions of interesting cases he has encountered in his medical practice and other topics of interest to infectious disease specialists.

PusCast (also known as Persiflagers Infectious Disease PusCast) was a bimonthly review of the infectious disease literature that ceased in early 2021.

== Writings ==
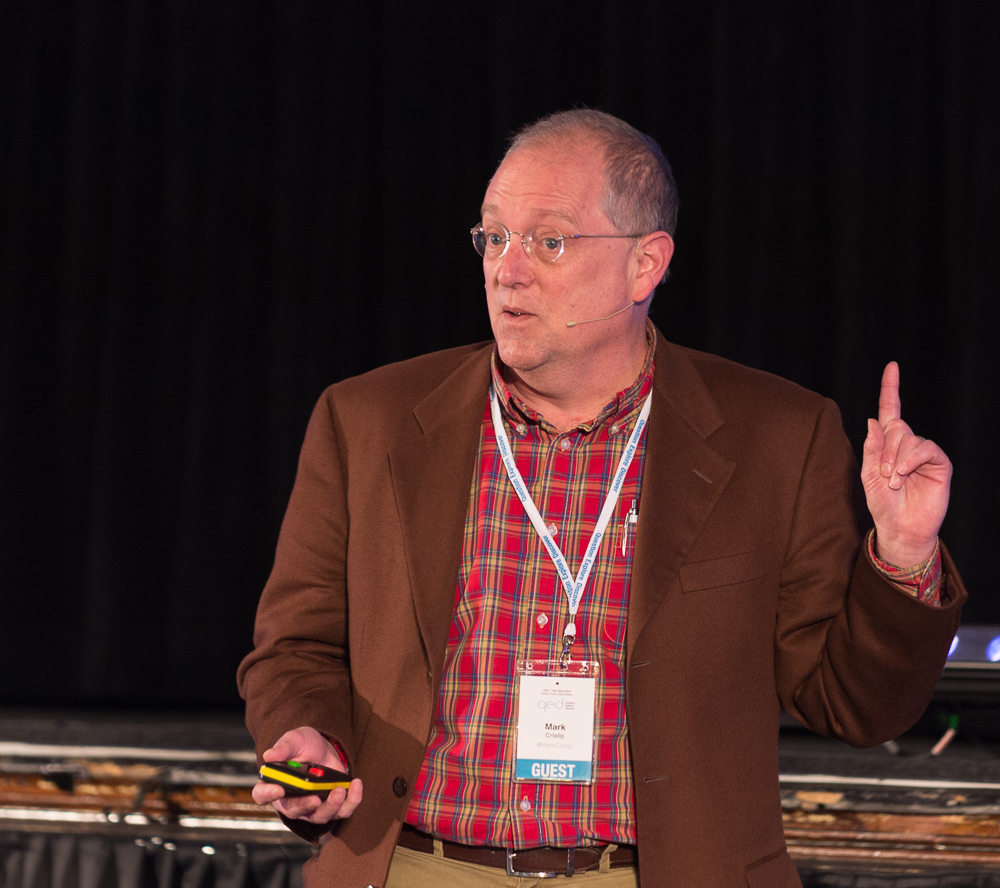
Mark Crislip at the QED Conference 2014

Crislip is listed as editor (emeritus) for the Science-Based Medicine blog where he regularly wrote posts on investigating the claims of alternative medicine until 2017. He is the co-editor, along with Steven Novella and David Gorski, of a 12-volume series of Science-Based Medicine Guides, based on posts from the Science-Based Medicine blog.

He writes posts for a Medscape blog called Rubor, Dolor, Calor, Tumor. Crislip compiled selections from his blogs into two e-books titled Puswhisperer: A Year in the Life of an Infectious Disease Doc (2014), and Puswhisperer Part Deux: Another Year of Pus (2016),

He is also the author of a medical app for Android and iPhone called Infectious Disease Compendium: A Guide to Infectious Diseases.

Skeptic magazine published an article by Crislip in 2008 titled "Near Death Experiences and the Medical Literature," in which he criticized a Lancet article that reported on near-death experiences without considering all the physiological factors that may have accounted for patients' subjective experiences.

== Other activities ==
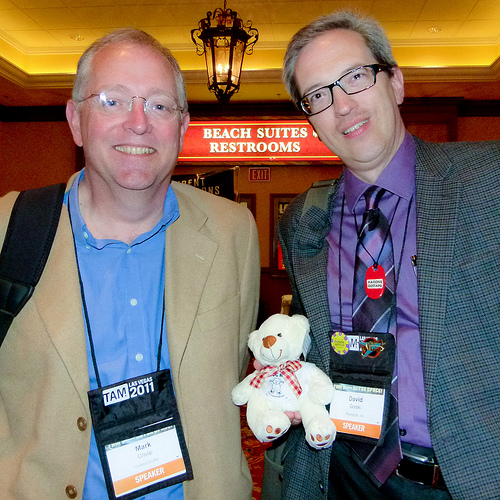
Mark Crislip (left) with David Gorski at The Amaz!ng Meeting 2011

Crislip was the president and co-founder of the Society for Science-Based Medicine (SfSBM), a nonprofit education and advocacy group. From 2013 to 2019, the SfSBM educated medical professionals and the general public about the importance of basing medical practices on science and advocated for laws to support the use of science in medicine. The organization's website included a wiki-based repository of material about questionable medical practices from Stephen Barrett's Quackwatch website.

He is a founding fellow of the Institute for Science in Medicine, a non-profit educational and policy institute that promotes science-based medical practices.

Several organizations that promote science and skepticism have invited Crislip lecture on alternative medicine and the anti-vaccine movement. He has spoken at The Amaz!ng Meeting three times, most recently in 2013. In June 2010 he gave a talk called "The Vaccine Pseudo-Controversy" for the Center for Inquiry Portland. In November 2013 he spoke at a meeting of Oregonians for Science and Reason on the topic of "Supplement, Complementary and Alternative Medicine Myths." He was also a featured speaker at the QED Conference in Manchester, England in April 2014.

Crislip is credited with an oft-cited quote critical of integrative medicine: "If you integrate fantasy with reality, you do not instantiate reality. If you mix cow pie with apple pie, it does not make the cow pie taste better; it makes the apple pie worse."

== Awards ==
Crislip has been on the Top Docs list published by Portland Monthly magazine several times, most recently in 2014. U.S. News & World Report listed him as a Top U.S. Physician in 2012. Hospital residents named him "Attending Most Likely to Tell It Like It Is."

== Books ==
- Puswhisperer 4: A Fourth Year in the Life of an Infectious Disease Doctor (2020) ISBN 9781938463808
- Puswhisperer III: A Third Year in the Life of an Infectious Disease Doctor (2018) ISBN 9781938463327
- Puswhisperer II: Another Year of Pus (2015) ISBN 9781938463648
- Puswhisperer: A Year in the Life of an Infectious Disease Doctor (2014) ISBN 9781938463624
