= Louis A. Mongello =

American radio personality and former attorney

Lou Mongello
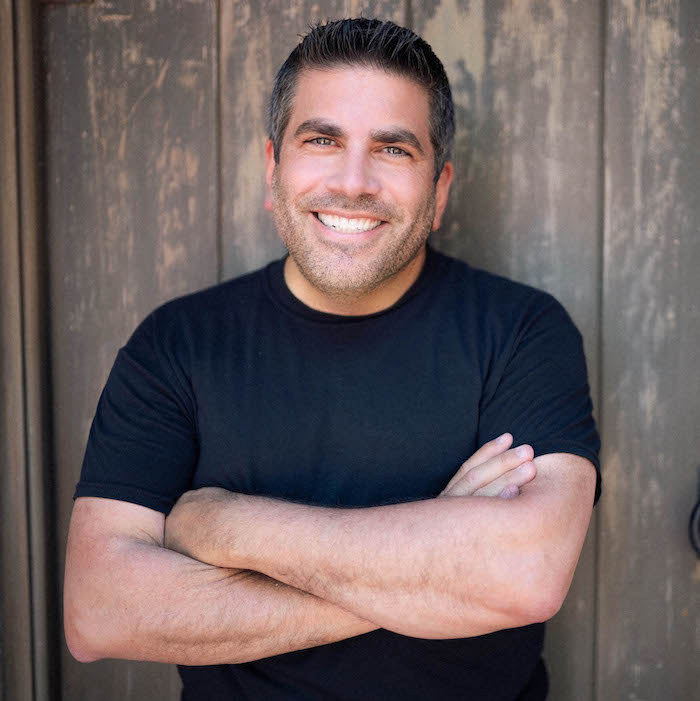
- Lou Mongello
- Education: Villanova University (BA); Seton Hall University (JD)
- Occupations: Radio personality, former attorney
- Known for: Reporting on Walt Disney World
- Website: www.wdwradio.com

Lou Mongello is an American radio personality and former attorney, known for his podcast about Walt Disney World. After leaving the practice of law, he founded WDW Radio in 2007, which would go on to be named Best Travel Podcast by the Podcast Awards for nine consecutive years.

Mongello is the author of the Walt Disney World Trivia Book series, 102 Ways to Save Money For and At Walt Disney World, The Disney Interviews: Volume 1, and Audio Tours of Walt Disney World, which he also narrates.

== Books ==
Mongello's first book was featured in the Fall 2005 issue of Seton Hall Magazine, Staten Island Parent, and the December 2004 issue of The Bookwatch.

- The Disney Interviews: Volume I (ISBN 978-0991498840)
- 102 Ways to Save Money For and at Walt Disney World (ISBN 978-0991498802)
- The Walt Disney World Trivia Book, Secrets History & Fun Facts Behind the Magic (ISBN 978-1887140492)
- The Walt Disney World Trivia Book 2, More Secrets History & Fun Facts Behind the Magic (ISBN 978-1887140638)
- Walt Disney World Trivia 2009 Calendar (ISBN 978-1887140775)
- Virtual AUDIO TOURS of Walt Disney World
