= Manager Tools Podcast =

Business podcast

Manager Tools LLC.
- Industry: Training, Management
- Founded: January 2005
- Founder: Michael Auzenne, Mark Horstman
- Headquarters: United States
- Products: Podcasts, Interview tools
- Services: Business consulting, podcasting
- Website: www.manager-tools.com

Manager Tools Podcast, which was founded in 2005, is a weekly audio podcast by Michael Auzenne and Mark Horstman, which focuses on career advice and helping managers become more effective. It was awarded People's Choice Podcast from Podcast Awards in 2008, and won the Best Business Podcast award in 2006, 2007, 2008, and 2012. In 2016, it was awarded the Legacy show in Business.

== Hosts ==
The podcast hosts, Mark Horstman and Mike Auzenne, are both graduates of West Point, the United States Military Academy, where they first met.

Auzenne spent nearly two decades in Corporate America as a manager and executive. His corporate career includes executive assignments in technology and Program Management for MCI Inc. and Bell Atlantic as well as several entrepreneurial pursuits in the restaurant and retail fitness industries.

Horstman was a manager and executive in sales and marketing at Procter & Gamble. He has coached and trained managers and executives since 1988.

== History ==
Horstman and Auzenne learned about podcasting in 2005 and decided that this could be a way to disseminate their knowledge about effective management. The co-founders have stated that they believe they can change the world by changing management, and that the way to change it is one manager at a time. After starting with the weekly free podcasts, both hosts became co-founders of Manager Tools LLC, a management consulting firm. They regularly consult to and train managers in Fortune 1000 companies around the world.

The first Manager Tools podcast was published on June 26, 2005, with the first Career Tools podcast published on December 4, 2008. The first live podcast was recorded with an audience after a conference and was published on October 31, 2010. The 500th episode was published on January 1, 2012.

The podcasts use no advertisement and most incoming links on the internet are from comments by users. The hosts have done talks in schools such as Robert R. McCormick School of Engineering and Applied Science and Kellogg School of Management.

== Podcasts ==
Most casts are about 30–40 minutes long, presented as a dialogue between the two hosts. They cover a specific topic related to management or career development. Casts start with an overview of the points to be discussed, followed by the discussion point by point, and end with a summary of the points discussed.

Manager Tools main podcasts are available on the webpage and also through iTunes and RSS feeds. The podcasts often refer to each other which in the past has created issues with new listeners. In order to help them, a collection of 'basics' casts has been created and is available on their website as well. Those cover mostly 'The Management Trinity' as well as additional basic notions.

== Notable content and theories ==
=== The Management Trinity ===
The hosts often refers to the "management trinity": one-on-ones, feedback, coaching, and delegation.

Other foundational principles as described include:

- Running Effective Meetings
- Methods for rolling out the Manager Tools Trinity
- Solution to a Stalled Technical Career

=== DISC assessment ===
Manager Tools often refer to the DISC assessment when adapting management and communication styles to individuals, which provides nonjudgmental language for exploring behavioral issues across four personality traits (dominance, influence, steadiness, and conscientious).

=== Other principles ===
Other principles referenced include:

- Horstman Curve (difficulty of growth at the beginning of a career)
- McGuire's Hump (regarding how hard it is to change)
- Horstman's Laws of Interviewing
- Horstman's Rule of Christmas
- The Wendii Curve (regarding Cultural Diversity)
- Walt's Rule (regarding how and where spend time)
- Horstman’s Law of Managerial Friction: It’s always harder to start change than it is to sustain it.
- Horstman's Corollary to Parkinson's Law ("Work contracts to fit the time you give it")
- Horstman's definition of conflict: more than one person in the same county.

== International ==
The show has attempted to expand globally. Since 2009, some of the podcasts and knowledge have been adapted in French, and since 2010, in German. Adaptations are created by third-party listeners.

As part of internationalization, Manager Tools conferences have been held in the United States, Europe, Australia and in China.
