= List of Utah State University faculty =

The following is a partial list of notable Utah State University faculty, past and present. Utah State University is located in Logan, Utah, and currently employs more than 800 faculty in seven colleges and schools. This list does not contain the names of presidents or alumni of the university, unless they also happen to fall into the faculty category.

== Notable faculty and staff ==
Notable USU Faculty

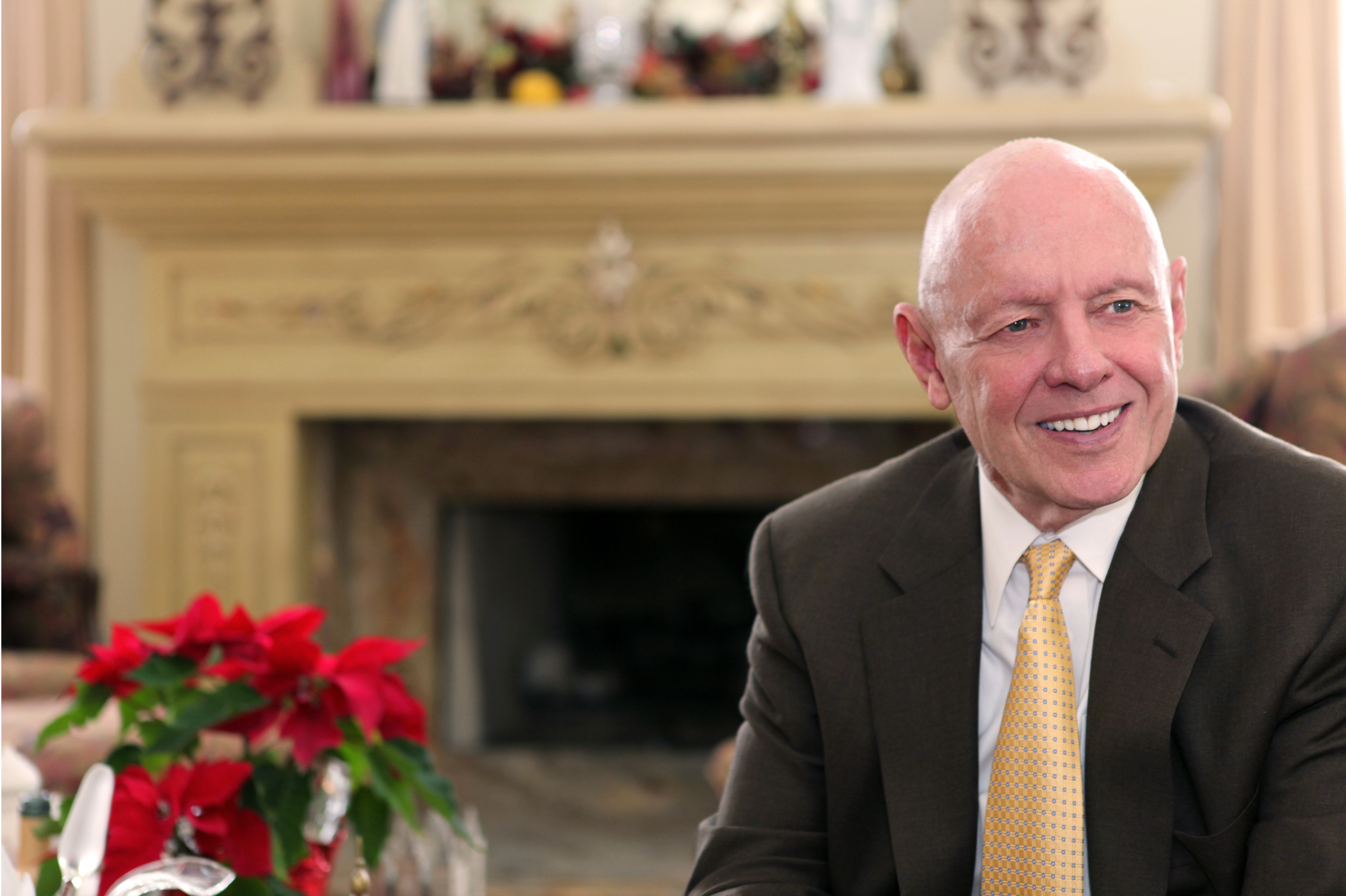
Stephen R. Covey

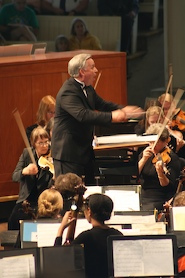
Craig Jessop

Rainer Maria Latzke

- Leon Anderson, professor emeritus of Sociology
- Leonard J. Arrington, "father of Mormon history"
- Michael Ballam, tenor
- Philip Barlow, world's first full-time professor of Mormon studies at a secular university
- Ken Brewer, poet
- George Dewey Clyde, governor of Utah
- Christopher Cokinos, poet and nonfiction writer
- Richard P. Condie, Grammy-winning former director of the Mormon Tabernacle Choir
- Stephen R. Covey, management scholar and author
- Spencer Cox, governor of Utah
- Hugo de Garis, artificial intelligence researcher
- Lee Frischknecht, former president of National Public Radio
- Fry Street Quartet, musicians
- Maura Hagan, physicist, member of the National Academy of Sciences
- Craig Jessop, former director of the Mormon Tabernacle Choir
- Don L. Lind, NASA astronaut; member of "The Original 19"
- Stew Morrill, former head men's basketball coach; over 500 wins in 23 seasons
- David Peak, physicist; mentored 1 Rhodes and 7 Goldwater Scholars; Utah Carnegie Professor of the Year
- Donald W. Roberts, research professor emeritus, Department of Biology
- Alexa Sand, art historian
- Joseph Tainter, anthropologist and historian
- John A. Widtsoe, former member of the Quorum of Twelve Apostles of the LDS Church
