= Brian Ibbott =

American podcaster

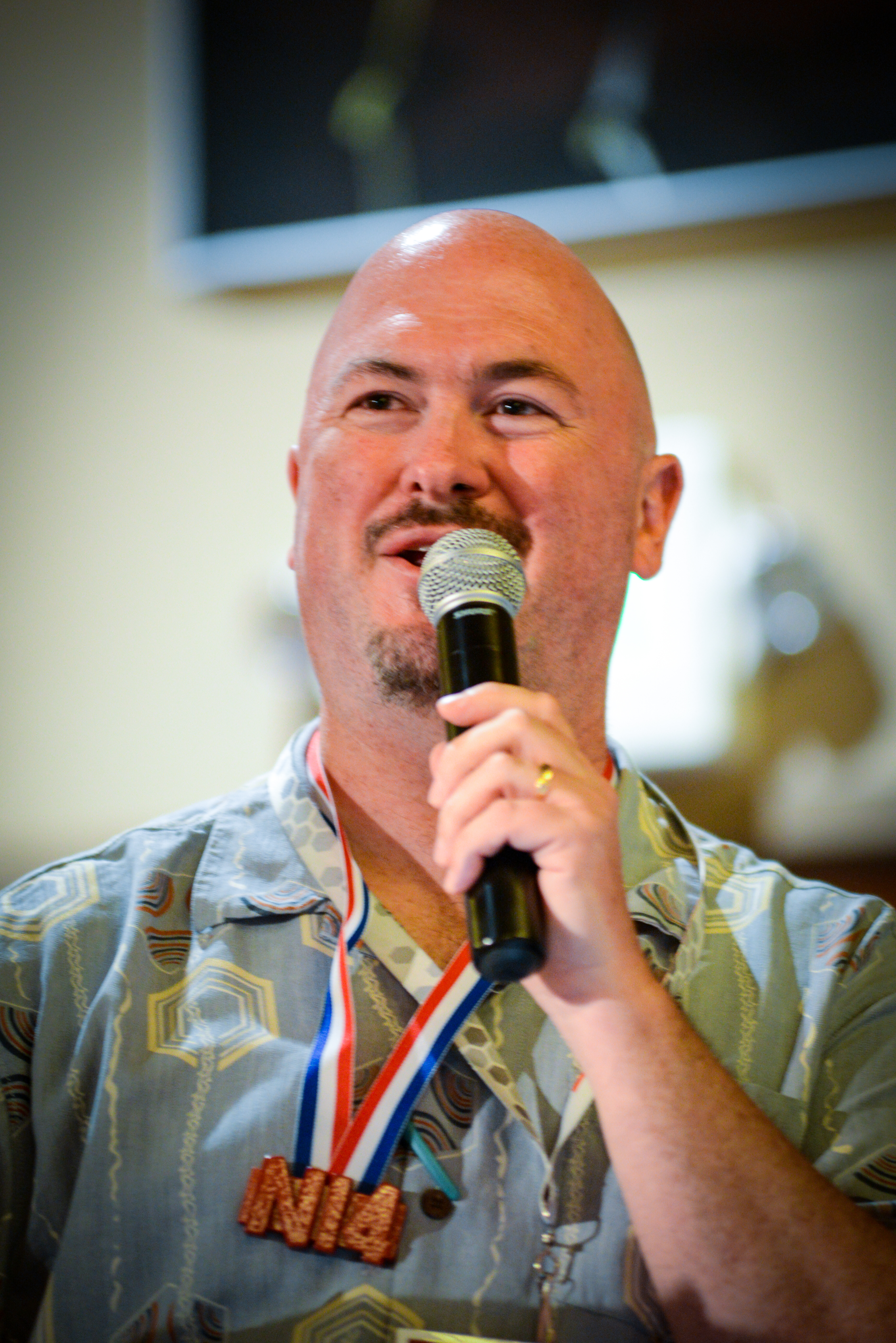
- at Nerdtacular 2014
- Notable work: Coverville
- Spouse: Tina
- Children: 1
- Website: www.coverville.com

Brian Ibbott is an American podcaster who lives in Arvada, Colorado, and is best known for his podcasts The Morning Stream and Coverville.

Ibbott attended art school, and in the 1990s worked for a few months as a wedding DJ. An early website he created was askbrian.com (2000), billed as "Pop-culture trivia questions delivered fresh to your door!", where he "answered nagging questions that stumped people". He has worked in customer service management and technical services, has freelanced in web development, and is married, with one son.

Ibbott's podcast Coverville began in September 2004 along with his business, Coverville Media LLC. Shows are released three times per week, drawn from an archive of 12,744 (as of 2008) cover songs in MP3 format on his laptop computer, with one episode per week an "all request show". Coverville is one of the longest running podcasts in the iTunes Store and also is in the top rankings for overall episode numbers. In August 2008, celebrating the 500th episode of Coverville, Ibbott hosted a 5-act concert in Las Vegas for his listeners. The show has won Podcast Connect's People's Choice Podcast Award for the years 2005, 2011, and 2012 in the "Podcast Safe Music" category.

He creates podcasts "for hire" for other companies, and produced two podcast segments for the Denver Post, Today In Music History and Lyrics Undercover (both retired). Ibbott continued producing both podcasts, and they are hosted on iTunes. He co-hosted the casual gaming podcast The Wii Show with the host of Tired Thumbs, Charlie George and Sara Phillips.

Ibbott has co-hosted the movie discussion podcast Film Sack with Scott Johnson, Randy Jordan, and Brian Dunaway since it started in 2009, and has co-hosted The Morning Stream with Johnson on Mondays through Thursdays, since its inception in January 2011.

Ibbott wrote a chapter of the O'Reilly book Podcasting Hacks (2005), entitled "Build a Great Music Podcast".

In 2012, Ibbott established the Coverville Records label, and released its first album entitled Smooth Federation, a collection of Star Trek arrangements done in jazz styling, arranged and performed by Andrew Allen. The project, including audio mastering, music licensing and production, was funded by a Kickstarter campaign which exceeded its funding goal.

In 2017, Ibbott was inducted into the Academy of Podcasters Hall of Fame.

He is a member and former coordinator of the Denver Podcasters Meetup.
