= Larissa Vassilian =

German journalist

Larissa Vassilian (born 17 June 1976) is a German journalist of German-Armenian descent. She became famous for her podcast "Schlaflos in München" (Sleepless in Munich), using the stage name Annik Rubens. The podcast had over 10,000 listeners daily, making her one of the most successful podcasters in the German language and winning a prestigious Podcast Awards in 2005 in the "Nonenglish" category. For German-language learners, she made another project called "Slow German" – a podcast on a variety of topics using clear slow pronunciation and with accompanying transcript.

== Biography ==
Vassilian was born in Konstanz, West Germany, to an Armenian father (Rouben Vassilian) and a Bavarian mother (Sylvia Vassilian). She attended the Franz-Marc-Gymnasium school in Markt Schwaben. After high school, from 1995 to 2003, she studied for a master's degree program in American cultural history, political science and ethnology at LMU Munich. In 2003 and 2004 she completed a correspondence course in freelance and feature writing from the London School of Journalism. She lives in Munich.
