= Roderick Vonhögen =

The Reverend Roderick Vonhögen
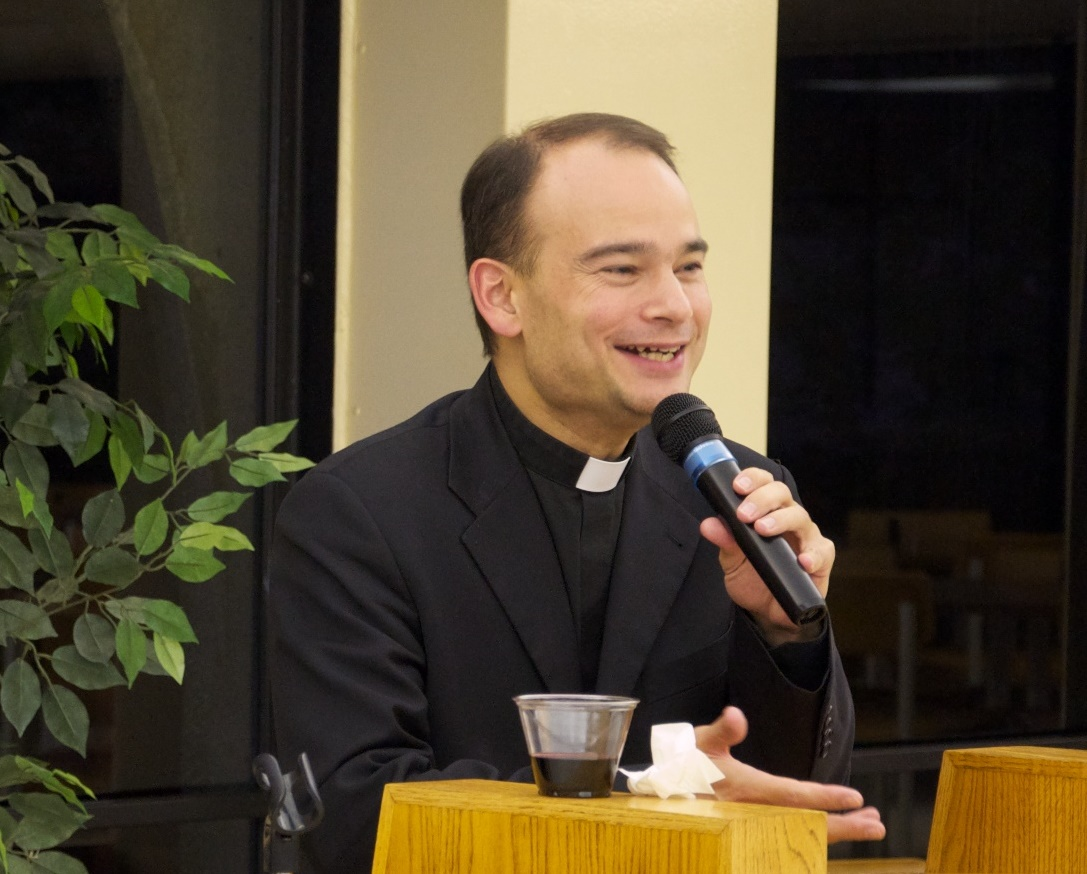
- Father Roderick in 2011

Personal details
- Born: 5 April 1968 (age 58) Leidschendam
- Occupation: Catholic Priest

Roderick Vonhögen (born 5 April 1968), also known as Father Roderick, is a Roman Catholic priest from Amersfoort, Netherlands. He is a podcaster and new media producer known for his projects that combine Catholicism with pop culture commentary.

== Career ==
In April 2005, Vonhögen recorded audio reports from Rome, chronicling the death of Pope John Paul II and the subsequent election of Pope Benedict XVI, and released them as a podcast called The Catholic Insider. Podcasting was brand-new at the time, and his use of the novel medium in the context of citizen journalism gained him international notoriety.

Vonhögen continued to launch new podcast projects throughout 2005, and folded them into a production company called SQPN (Star Quest Production Network) which he co-founded that year. Under SQPN branding, Vonhögen produced a talk show called The Daily Breakfast (which won the 2006, 2007, and 2008 People's Choice Podcast Awards in the Religion category) and a series of podcasts called Secrets that gave Catholic commentary on media franchises such as Lost, Star Wars, Harry Potter, and Indiana Jones. In 2018, he stepped down as CEO of SQPN to focus on his work with Trideo, another media venture which he launched in 2014.

Vonhögen is also known for his Star Wars fandom, having created a fan website called The Virtual Edition which was popular in the years after its 1997 launch, during the time when the Star Wars prequel trilogy was being produced. He received widespread media attention again in 2015 for his reaction to the teaser trailer for the film Star Wars: The Force Awakens.

== See also ==
- Religion and spirituality podcast
