= The Fantasy Footballers =

Sports podcast

- The podcast cover artwork
- Genre: Sports (Fantasy Football)
- Language: English

Cast and voices
- Hosted by: Andy Holloway, Jason Moore, Mike Wright

Production
- Camera: Bryan Ketron
- Production: Brooks "Judge Giamatti" Carmean, Jeremy "Owl Borland" Grantham
- Length: Approx. 1 hour

Publication
- No. of episodes: 1,668 as of November 1, 2024
- Original release: September 2014
- Updates: 2 Times Per Week (Jan-July); 3 Times Per Week (July-Aug); 5 Times Per Week (Aug-Jan)

Reception
- Cited for: 2019 Best Sports Podcast (iHeartRadio Podcast Awards) 2016–19 People's Choice (Podcast Awards)

Related
- Website: thefantasyfootballers.com

YouTube information
- Channel: The Fantasy Footballers
- Years active: 2015–present
- Subscribers: 383 thousand
- Views: 99.8 million
- Last updated: November 1, 2024

The Fantasy Footballers is a sports podcast hosted by Andy Holloway, Jason Moore, and Mike Wright where they provide fantasy football advice. The show runs continuously throughout the year with a minimum of two episodes per week during the offseason.

== History ==
The show's logo

The Fantasy Footballers was launched by Holloway, Moore, and Wright in 2014. The initial idea came after Holloway and Wright had started a joke podcast for their own personal workplace league while all three were working in the video game industry in Arizona, discussing trades and ridiculing other members of their fantasy football league. Moore began as a background contributor before joining as a co-host in 2015.

In summer 2018, The Fantasy Footballers held their first five-city live podcast tour The People's Fantasy Tour, with a second following in 2019.

In 2018, both Holloway and Moore featured in the top 10 most accurate fantasy experts on FantasyPros while staff writer Robert Waziak was ranked No. 2 overall. That year the podcast had more than 100 million downloads.

== Format and features ==
The #FootClan As a completely independent podcast without network backing, The Fantasy Footballers relies on a tight knit fantasy community and is part-funded by Patreon members affectionately called the #FootClan. Subscribed members have access to additional features including a weekly Patreon-only mailbag show called the #FootCast, forums on the show's website, premium versions of the website's analysis tools and exclusive leagues with other #FootClan members.

Nicknames A popular and recurring feature of The Fantasy Footballers is the hosts giving NFL players comedic nicknames and creating corresponding audio drops which are played when they are mentioned. The most popular are put on a t-shirt available to buy on the show's website at the end of every season and the best new nickname is voted on by fans during the show's annual The Footie Awards.

Water Bets In November 2015, The Fantasy Footballers released their own mobile app called The Wheel of Water. The app features as part of the show's regular water bets where the loser of a wager has a cup of water thrown on them as punishment with the wheel helping decide on method of delivery. The app is available for free on both iOS and Android.

Jay Griz Whenever one of the hosts is absent they are replaced by a giant cardboard cut out of a grizzly bear named Jay Griz, "the cardboard bear extraordinaire." As of September 2021, a Twitter account for Jay Griz has over 31,000 followers.

== Awards and nominations ==
The Fantasy Footballers podcast is multi-award-winning, People's Choice awards from the Podcast Awards four straight years for 2016, 2017, 2018 and 2019 and Best Sports Podcast from iHeartRadio Podcast Awards in 2019.

Year	Award	Category	Result	Ref.
2016	Podcast Awards	Best Sports & Recreation Podcast	Won	
2016	Podcast Awards	People's Choice	Won	
2016	Academy of Podcasters	Best Sports & Recreation Podcast	Nominated	
2016	Academy of Podcasters	People's Choice	Won	
2016	Fantasy Sports Trade Association	Best Fantasy Sports Podcast (<20 employees)	Won	
2017	Podcast Awards	Best Sports & Recreation Podcast	Won	
2017	Podcast Awards	People's Choice	Won	
2017	Academy of Podcasters	Best Sports & Recreation Podcast	Finalist	
2017	Fantasy Sports Writers Association	Best Fantasy Football Podcast	Won	
2017	Fantasy Sports Trade Association	Small Fantasy Business of the Year	Won	
2017	Fantasy Sports Trade Association	Best Video Show (30+ minutes)	Nominated	
2017	Fantasy Sports Trade Association	Best Podcast	Nominated	
2017	Fantasy Sports Trade Association	Most Outstanding Social Media	Won	
2018	Podcast Awards	Best Sports & Recreation Podcast	Won	
2018	Podcast Awards	People's Choice	Won	
2018	iHeartRadio Podcast Awards	Best Sports Podcast	Nominated	
2018	Fantasy Sports Writers Association	Best Fantasy Football Podcast	Won	
2018	Fantasy Sports Trade Association	Small Fantasy Business of the Year	Won	
2018	Fantasy Sports Trade Association	Humanitarian of the Year	Won	
2018	Fantasy Sports Trade Association	Best Podcast	Nominated	
2019	Podcast Awards	People's Choice	Won	
2019	iHeartRadio Podcast Awards	Best Sports Podcast	Won	
2020	Podcast Awards	Best Sports & Recreation Podcast	Won	
2020	Fantasy Sports Writers Association	Best Fantasy Football Podcast	Nominated	

== Other work ==
Beyond their own podcast episodes, The Fantasy Footballers regularly guest on other fantasy football shows including The Rich Eisen Show and host a two-hour weekly Sirius XM show.

In June 2018, Andy, Mike and Jason began a weekly spinoff comedy podcast called The Spitballers.

During the 2019 season The Fantasy Footballers competed in several high-profile celebrity leagues including Pittsburgh Steelers wide receiver JuJu Smith-Schuster's Sleeper Bowl featuring Zac Efron and Ninja, and the NFL Network's own celebrity fantasy league which had a companion show hosted by NFL analyst Adam Rank.
