= Scott Johnson (cartoonist) =

American cartoonist and podcaster

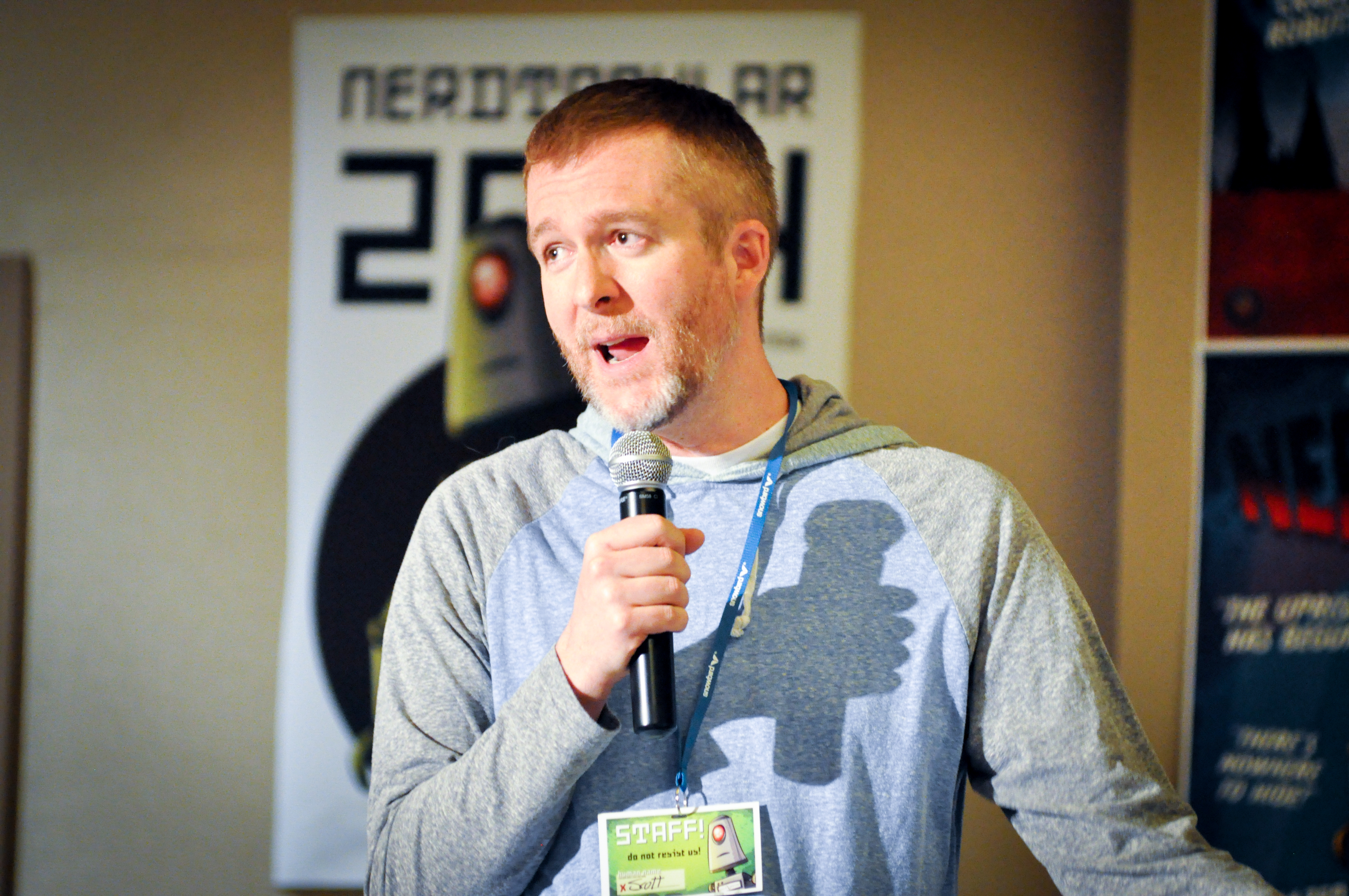
- Johnson at the Nerdtacular 2014 Conference
- Born: Scott Blaine Johnson; July 17, 1969 (age 56); Salt Lake City, Utah, US
- Occupations: Cartoonist, illustrator, game designer, podcaster
- Notable work: ExtraLife Radio; Film Sack; The Morning Stream; Rock Runners Incorporated
- Spouse: Kim
- Website: www.frogpants.com

Scott Blaine Johnson (born July 17, 1969) is an American cartoonist, illustrator, game designer, and podcaster. He lives in South Jordan, Utah, with his wife and three children. In 2008, Johnson launched Frog Pants Studios, LLC, an illustration and audio production company.

== Early life ==
Scott Johnson was born in Salt Lake City, Utah. He grew up and went to high school in the suburb Sandy City. He has also lived in Mississippi and Louisiana while on a mission for the Church of Jesus Christ of Latter-day Saints (LDS Church). Johnson met his wife Kim during his mission.

== Comics and illustration ==
Johnson began publishing the webcomic ExtraLife in June 2001. The subject matter concentrates on many of Johnson's interests such as computers, technology, video games, and movies. In 2009, Johnson launched Experience Points, a second webcomic that draws inspiration from World of Warcraft and other MMORPG computer games. The strip was one of several web comics published by Crispy Gamer until its closure in January 2010. It then was moved to GameCulture.

Johnson is the creator of the popular "56 Geeks" poster, and he illustrated the cover of World of Warcraft Programming (2010).

On February 3, 2020, the Fred and Can webcomic debuted. Fred and Can chronicles the adventures of Fred and his sentient can of expired creamed corn.

== Games ==
=== Rock Runners Incorporated ===
In 2021, Johnson releases the card game Rock Runners Incorporated that he both designed and illustrated. The game is based on the card game 99, which Johnson's parents taught him. Rock Runners Inc. takes some of the original concepts of 99 and adds an intergalactic twist. The object of the game to get the most space rocks and be the last player to make a play and earn a space credit.

== Current Podcasts ==
Johnson is the creator and host of several podcasts. This list is incomplete but include the following.

=== Play Retro ===
Johnson's latest podcast, Play Retro, debuted on January 3, 2022. It is co-hosted by Brian Dunaway and focuses on the topic of retro video games.

=== SKIM ===
Scott and Kim Johnson host a weekly podcast where they discuss family, marriage, food and more. It debuted on November 8, 2018.

=== The Morning Stream ===
Started on January 24, 2011, with Johnson and Brian Ibbott. It is published every Monday, Tuesday, Wednesday, and Thursday morning (usually) for the discussion of current entertainment, politics, live calls, and other segments. The Morning Stream won a People's Choice Podcast Award in the entertainment category in 2011, and two in 2013, in the People's Choice and Comedy categories.

In March 2014 Johnson and Ibbott began producing a weekly evening edition of the show, airing live on Thursday nights and published as a podcast the morning after; this version is called TMS PM, features most of the same elements as the morning show and is a one-hour long show, rather than the usual two hours, but it includes two songs each time like the other daily episodes. TMS PM is a Patreon exclusive, given as a reward for supporters having reached the $5,000-per-month donation tier on the show's Patreon page.

=== Film Sack ===
Started on October 31, 2009, Johnson and co-hosts Brian Ibbott, Brian Dunaway, and Randy Jordan review 'forgotten gems' of movies selected from the streaming media service Netflix. Film Sack won a Podcast Connect People's Choice Podcast Award in the film category in 2011 and in 2013.

=== Diary of a Cartoonist ===
The Diary of a Cartoonist podcast has an introspective stream-of-consciousness format where Johnson discusses topics ranging from the day-to-day activities in his life to his thoughts about current events. Unlike Johnson's other podcasts, Diary of a Cartoonist does not have co-hosts, though his family occasionally make brief appearances. Johnson often records the podcast using his iPhone while engaging in other activities such as driving or walking his dog.

=== AppSlappy ===
In June 2009, Johnson began publishing the weekly podcast AppSlappy, dedicated to reviewing Apple iPhone (and later, iPad) applications. Johnson, with co-hosts Eric Van Skyhawk and Eileen Rivera (Tom Merritt's wife), review and rate popular apps. The podcast also covers news and rumors related to the iPhone and iPad. As of August 2013, AppSlappy is on hiatus. App Slappy was later repurposed into a recurring segment (sometimes referred to as App Time!) on one of Johnson's other shows, The Morning Stream, where he and co-host Brian Ibbott review mobile games and other apps.

== Past Podcasts ==
=== There Will Be Dungeons ===
Episode 00 debuted on January 26, 2018. It was quickly followed-up by Episode 01: The Campaign Begins! on January 27, 2018. It was a live Dungeons and Dragons campaign, following the group through Dust Hill. In the later period of the podcast, the Dungeon Master was changed and it became a season based campaign following a different set of characters. The last episode was released on 29th, October 2022.

=== The Instance ===
The Instance was an award-winning weekly World of Warcraft podcast started in 2006 by Johnson and then-ExtraLife Radio host Andrew Konietzky, both of whom noticed a lack of podcasts dedicated to the MMO. The show was dedicated to news and rumors about the game, and relied heavily on listener contribution. An early contributor, Randy "RandyDeluxe" Jordan, joined the podcast as a third seat on show 45, and eventually became second seat when Konietzky left the show in 2007. Jordan was a part of the show (becoming a regular guest on ExtraLife Radio, and a co-host on Film Sack) until a job opportunity at Blizzard Entertainment (makers of World of Warcraft) required him to retire his position. Episode #217: "Now I've Gotta Go..." was Jordan's final show, and was dedicated to him. Jordan's replacements were Mark "Turpster" Turpin (a former guest and friend of the show) and William "Dills" Gregory (a member and raider in the Instance guild, alea iacta est). In 2014, Patrick Beja (a friend of the network and former Blizzard employee) joined that podcast as a 4th seat. The podcast won a Blogger's Choice Award in 2008 for Best Podcast. The podcast concluded with Episode 666: The Final Boss, on February 25, 2022.

Former guests have included Veronica Belmont, Felicia Day, Tom Merritt, and retired Boston Red Sox pitcher Curt Schilling, who also co-hosted the show with Randy and Johnson for several months.

=== ExtraLife Radio ===
Johnson's oldest podcast, ExtraLife Radio (often shortened to ELR) began in 2003 as a stand-alone downloadable MP3 file. It was a bi-monthly show that covered a wide variety of subjects, including video games, movies, comic books, and many random subjects as the hosts saw fit. It was a self-proclaimed geek show, for and by geeks.

In 2005, the delivery format was changed to a podcast. The original hosts other than Johnson were cartoonists Sergio "Obsidian" Villa-Isaza (nicknamed "O") and Brian Dunaway, and forum contributor Andrew Konietzky (who left the show in 2007). In addition to this panel the show also often featured guests and infrequent or frequent guest hosts. Mark Larson, a childhood friend of Johnson's, joined Johnson in studio (whereas most other guests, as well as the three other co-hosts, used Skype to connect) every week for a period until gas prices deterred him from driving to Johnson's house for the show. Afterwards he would appear infrequently over Skype as well as frequently sending in a 3-minute Movie Reviews segment.

ExtraLife Radio won a People's Choice Podcast Award in 2008 and other awards over its four-year run. On February 12, 2010, after 233 shows, Johnson announced that ELR would no longer be recording and be placed on what he called an "indefinite hiatus" in a blog post titled "All Good Things..."

On September 5, 2010, on Diary of a Cartoonist Johnson said he missed ExtraLife Radio and has considered bringing it back, but also noted that its layout would probably be different and not include consistent panel members.

=== FourCast ===
Started on July 7, 2009, Tom Merritt and co-host Johnson invite various guests and discuss the future and what it might contain in a so-called virtual fireside setting. Fourcast, not part of the Frogpants network, was produced and hosted by Merritt's main employer at the time, TWiT.tv. The podcast ended in June 2012.

=== Current Geek ===
Started on November 13, 2009, Johnson again teamed up Tom Merritt for 3-times-a-week dose of the geekiest stories around the world. After some difficulties and a hiatus, this show was revived as a weekly segment on The Morning Stream. After Merritt's contract ran out with TWiT in December 2013,

Current Geek was restarted as a standalone weekly show in January 2014.

=== Hypothetical Help ===
Started on March 29, 2010, Johnson and co-host Mark Turpin a.k.a. "Turpster" tackle the world of hypothetical counseling. Listeners are invited to call and leave a recorded question, or record a sound file, to have Johnson and Turpster possibly play it on the show and then give their best comedic advice to solve the world's problems. Episodes feature about 3 user calls each, and are about 30 minutes long.

=== Final Score ===
Restarted on April 9, 2010, Johnson and co-host Brian Dunaway tackle the field of video games. New releases, reviews, retrogaming, and game "first plays" are some of the topics covered. Johnson and Dunaway were joined by Nicole Spagnuolo (aka Nicole Spag) of the Ladies of Leet podcast and blog at episode 20.

In February 2015 the show was put on hiatus.

=== The Creep ===
Started on September 9, 2010, with Johnson and co-host Brian Hough, described as "the StarCraft 2 podcast, helping you find your way in the StarCraft Universe." It is geared to be of interest to new and highly experienced players, with news, tips, and tricks. It started out in a bi-weekly format, but in episode 13 in February 2011 it was announced that due to lack of regular quality content and information release in the StarCraft universe, the podcast would be recorded whenever there was enough information to produce a show. This resulted in a 6-month hiatus. Episode 14 saw the return of The Creep in September 2011 when it was announced that shows would again be more regularly recorded than every 6–12 months.

=== AutoPilot ===
Started on March 10, 2012, Johnson is joined by Tom Merritt in a podcast in which the duo watch and dissect early television pilot episodes from classic and modern shows. The first full episode was published in late March 2012, about the Star Trek pilot episode "The Cage".

== Community ==
Fans and contributors to The Instance are invited to join the show's U.S. Earthen Ring Server guild named Alea Iacta Est (AIE), which, currently at over 6,300 active members, makes it one of the largest guilds in World of Warcraft. Johnson's main character on AIE, a level 60 orc hunter named Gerp, is a founder and officer of the guild. Notable members have included Curt Schilling, Veronica Belmont, Leo Laporte and Tom Merritt. Johnson is well known in the Utah area both for his online work and as host of the increasingly popular Nerdtacular event, an annual gathering of fans, friends, and members of the Frogpants community.

In 2007, Johnson was targeted with a cease and desist email by disbarred attorney and American activist Jack Thompson for running a photograph parody contest on the Myextralife site.
