= Coverville =

Music podcast

- Genre: Cover songs, Music podcast
- Language: English

Cast and voices
- Hosted by: Brian Ibbott

Production
- Length: Varies

Publication
- Original release: September 2004
- Updates: Weekly
- License: ASCAP, BMI and SESAC

Related
- Website: www.coverville.com

Coverville is a podcast featuring cover versions of pop, rock and country songs by new and established performers. The show is produced and hosted by Brian Ibbott out of his home in Arvada, Colorado.

Coverville was also part of the programming of the experimental KYCY-AM "open source radio" station San Francisco during the mid-2000s.

== History ==
The coverville logo

Ibbott, who wanted to be a disc jockey as a child, began his DJ career at weddings, though was bored with the music selection such venues permitted. A TechTV story he saw in August 2004 got him interested in podcasting. The first Coverville podcast was launched on September 28, 2004. Coverville passed episode #300 on March 4, 2007 and episode #500 on August 26, 2008, which was celebrated with a "gala" in Las Vegas where fans could meet with artists featured on the show.

As one of the early music-based podcasts, Coverville contributed to the legal podcasting of copyrighted music in the US. One month after beginning the podcase, Ibbott contacted major performance rights organisations (initially ASCAP and BMI) to explain the technology and delivery methods behind podcasting and to license music for Coverville. The licensing organizations adapted their non-interactive license to include podcast licensing shortly thereafter. Ibbott was active in publicizing this information among other podcasters.

Coverville has been discussed in articles appearing in print and online publications such as Rolling Stone and BusinessWeek Online, and recommended by the BBC. In 2005, 2011, 2012, and 2013, Coverville won Podcast Connect's People's Choice Podcast Award in the "Podcast Safe Music" category.

In 2005, Ibbott estimated 5000 subscribers for Coverville, which grew by 2007 to an estimated 35,000 listeners.

== Features ==
For the first part of its run, a typical episode of Coverville had about six cover songs, and was generally released on a three-per-week schedule. Weekly features typically included a Sunday all-request show, trivia challenges (where Brian, with help from his wife, try to solve various name-that-tune type challenges), and the Uncovered Gem Of The Week, a track that isn't a cover, but that the host likes. It is common for an episode of Coverville to have a theme. Frequent themes include:

- Cover Story – An episode devoted to a single prominent artist, with a number of different covers of songs all originally by the same artist, sometimes also including the artist covering someone else in return. For example, the Depeche Mode Cover Story included six other artists covering Depeche Mode, but also included Depeche Mode lead singer Dave Gahan covering Roxy Music.
- Originalville – An episode dedicated to playing the original versions of songs whose covers became famous, but whose original versions are relatively poorly known.
- A Cappella – An entire show dedicated to a cappella cover songs.
- Lost In Translation – An entire episode based on cover songs performed in a different language than the original.
- Cover To Cover Interview – A show-length interview with someone, interspersed with their favorite covers or cover songs they have performed.
- Coverville Idol – In the style of American Idol, contestants create and submit cover tracks based on a given theme. For 2006, the winner was "Walk Like an Egyptian" covered by the a cappella group No Strings Attached.
- Degrees of Coveration – connections between various musicians. Musician A does a song by musician B, then musician B does a song by musician C, etc.

Currently episodes come out weekly, with occasional breaks, and consist of 2-3 segments, each of which has about 6 songs. These segments may be themed around an artist with a recent milestone birthday, a recently deceased artist, or (less often) any of the themes listed above. Another theme that occasionally appears is an "Album Cover": a full-album cover story, including covers of every song on a famous album with a milestone anniversary, such as the Album Cover for Dark Side Of The Moon posted in March 2023 for the album's 50th anniversary.

=== Countdown ===
At the end of the year, Coverville does a countdown of listeners' favorite cover versions. The following is a list of the top five from 2005 to 2012:

2012

1. "Somebody That I Used To Know", covered by Walk Off the Earth, originally by Gotye
2. "Major Tom (Coming Home)", covered by Shiny Toy Guns, originally by Peter Schilling
3. "Ring of Fire", covered by Social Distortion, originally by Johnny Cash
4. " The Mercy Seat", covered by Johnny Cash, originally by Nick Cave and the Bad Seeds
5. "Hotel California", covered by Gipsy Kings, originally by The Eagles

2011

1. "Village Green Preservation Society", covered by Kate Rusby, originally by The Kinks
2. "Hotel California", covered by Gipsy Kings, originally by The Eagles
3. "Disappointed", covered by State Shirt, originally by Electronic
4. "Single Ladies (Put a Ring on It)", covered by Pomplamoose, originally by Beyoncé
5. "All Along the Watchtower (from 'Crossroads, Part 2')", covered by Bt4, originally by Bob Dylan

2010

1. "Somewhere Over the Rainbow"/"What a Wonderful World", covered by Israel Kamakawiwo'ole, originally by Judy Garland/Wizard of Oz
2. "The Mercy Seat", covered by Johnny Cash, originally by Nick Cave and the Bad Seeds
3. "God Only Knows", covered by Petra Haden, originally by The Beach Boys
4. "Village Green Preservation Society", covered by Kate Rusby, originally by The Kinks
5. "Oops!... I Did It Again", covered by Richard Thompson, originally by Britney Spears

2009

1. "Village Green Preservation Society", covered by Kate Rusby, originally by Kinks
2. "All Along The Watchtower", covered by Bt4/Bear McCreary, originally by Bob Dylan
3. "Somewhere Over the Rainbow", covered by Israel Kamakawiwo'ole, originally by Judy Garland
4. "Billie Jean", covered by Chris Cornell, originally by Michael Jackson
5. "Don't Stop Believin'", covered by Petra Haden, originally by Journey

2008

1. "I Kissed A Girl", covered by Max Vernon, originally by Katy Perry
2. "Hurt", covered by Johnny Cash, originally by Nine Inch Nails
3. "All That She Wants", covered by Max Vernon, originally by Ace of Base
4. "Hallelujah", covered by Jeff Buckley, originally by Leonard Cohen
5. "Fields Of Gold", covered by Eva Cassidy, originally by Sting

2007

1. "Romeo and Juliet", covered by Monte Montgomery, originally by Dire Straits
2. "Baby Got Back", covered by Jonathan Coulton, originally by Sir Mix A Lot
3. "Common People", covered by William Shatner, originally by Pulp
4. "Hurt", covered by Johnny Cash, originally by Nine Inch Nails
5. "Hot in Herre", covered by Jenny Owen Youngs, originally by Nelly

2006

1. "Hurt", covered by Johnny Cash, originally by Nine Inch Nails
2. "Toxic", covered by Nickel Creek, originally by Britney Spears
3. "Hallelujah", covered by Jeff Buckley, originally by Leonard Cohen
4. "Lithium", covered by The Polyphonic Spree, originally by Nirvana
5. "Baby Got Back", covered by Jonathan Coulton, originally by Sir Mix-A-Lot

2005

1. "Hurt", covered by Johnny Cash, originally by Nine Inch Nails
2. "Baby Got Back", covered by Jonathan Coulton, originally by Sir Mix-A-Lot
3. "Common People", covered by William Shatner, originally by Pulp
4. "Hallelujah", covered by Jeff Buckley, originally by Leonard Cohen
5. "I Will Survive", covered by Cake, originally by Gloria Gaynor

== See also ==
- Music podcast
