= David Peak =

David Peak is Professor of Physics at Utah State University. His current research focuses on the interdisciplinary field of complexity and computation in biological phenomena, motivated by the similarities between stomata and cellular automata. Peak was one founder of the National Council on Undergraduate Research and is on the governing board (formerly the Chair) of the National Conferences on Undergraduate Research.

Peak has won multiple Utah State awards for teaching, faculty advising, and research mentoring at USU and was a recipient of an American Physical Society Prize for Research Done with Undergraduates. Of the sixteen courses he has taught at USU, ten were created by him. Peak has been a long-time advisor to the USU chapter of the Society of Physics of Students and formerly to the Microgravity Research Team. The USU chapter of SPS was an Outstanding Chapter three years in a row in the 2000s. The USU Microgravity Research Team has sent more student experiments into space than any other university. He has mentored one Rhodes Scholar (Lara Anderson, 2004) and seven recipients of the Goldwater Scholarship.

== Sources ==
- CV
- A helpful link
