= Ethan Tufts =

American singer-songwriter

- Also known as: State Shirt
- Born: Ethan Tufts; 9 June 1976 (age 49); Northampton, Massachusetts, U.S.
- Instruments: Vocals, Guitar, Bass, Synths, Drums
- Years active: 2001 - present
- Labels: Los Fucking Angeles
- Website: www.stateshirt.com

Ethan Tufts is an American songwriter, composer, multi-instrumentalist and YouTuber. He creates music under the pseudonym State Shirt. Tufts is known for creating automotive videos on the YouTube channel Hello Road.

== State Shirt ==
Tufts' music is known for its diverse and often unpredictable style, integrating live looping in both recordings and live performances. All of his songs are open source and licensed via Creative Commons, providing raw materials for the hundreds of remix artists that have created new works based on his source tracks. Tufts currently resides in Los Angeles, California.

He released his debut album Don't Die in 2004, and his second album This Is Old in 2008. The first single from This is Old is "Fell Out of the Sky," a song inspired by the black box data recordings recovered from the crash of Pacific Southwest Airlines Flight 182, September 25, 1978. Let's Get Bloody was released in 2008, and his most recent album, Lost Hills was released in August 2015.

== Discography ==
=== Albums ===
- New Planet (2002)
- Don't Die (2004)
- This Is Old (2008)
- Let's Get Bloody (2011)
- Life Is Easy (2015)
- Lost Hills (2015)

== Interviews ==
- Andrew Shaw, "Speed Date: Talking Tacos, Heroes & Spending Unhealthy Amounts of Time in the Studio", Buzzine, December 20, 2011
- Heather Rush, "An Interview with State Shirt - Ethan Tufts", HiddenTrack (Blog), masslive.com, February 16, 2009
- "The Guitar Hero Series: State Shirt", Interview, JemSite, jemsite.com

== Reviews ==
- Jay Gary, "State Shirt goes beyond stereotype", Central Michigan Life, January 24, 2012
- "State Shirt - Don't Die" 'Whisperin' And Hollerin', Review
- "State Shirt - Don't Die", Review, Plug-In Music.com
