= List of Utah State University alumni =

Notable alumni

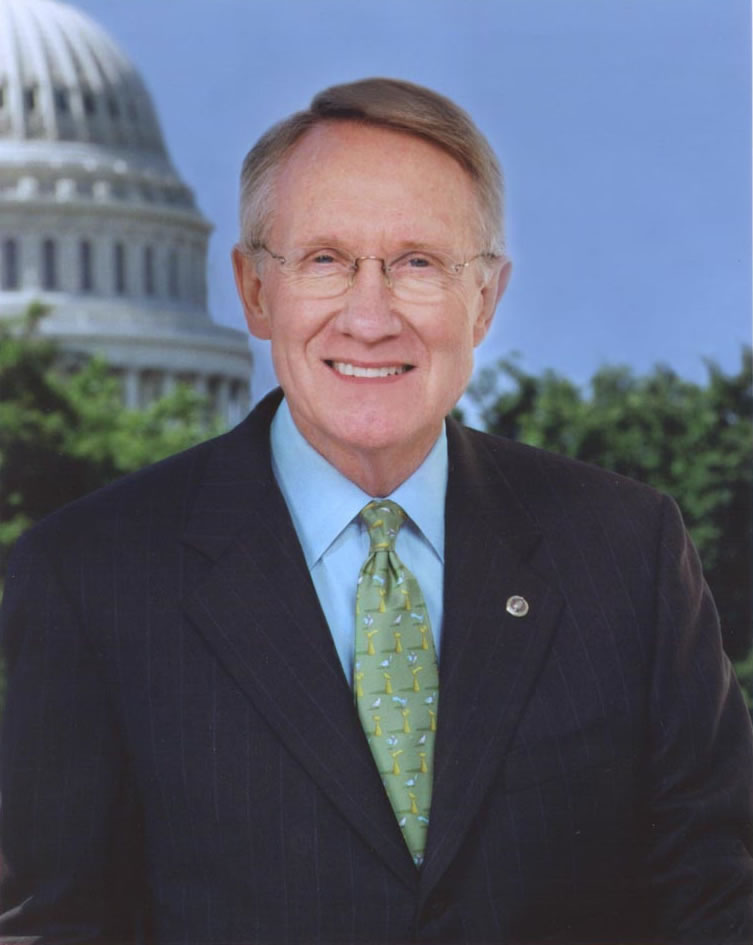
Harry Reid, BS '61, U.S. senator, D-NV

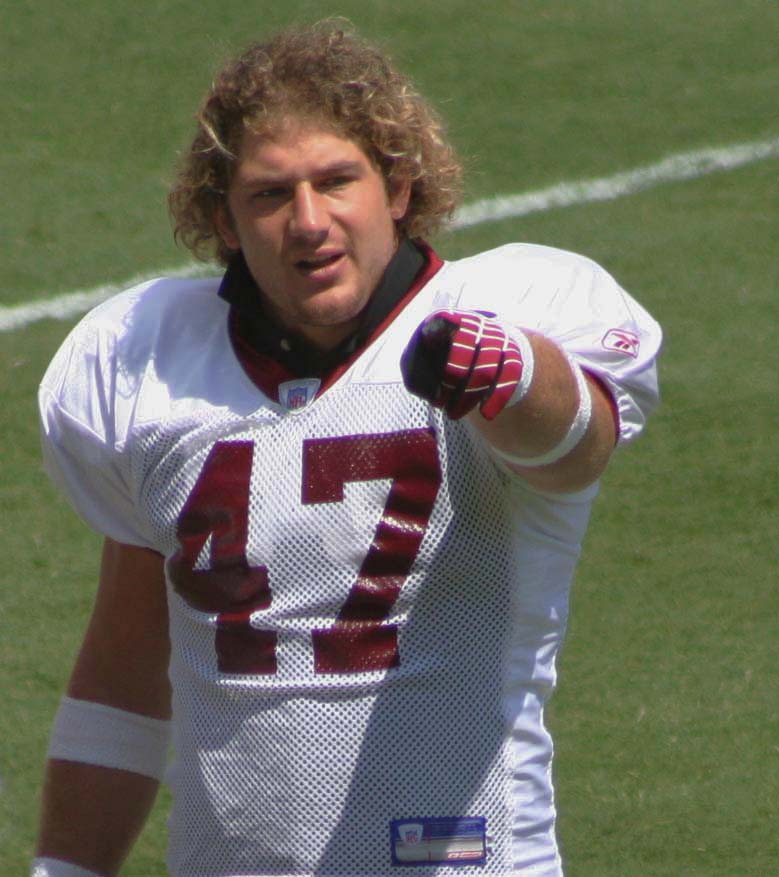
Chris Cooley, two-time NFL Pro Bowl tight end

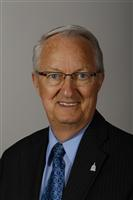
Dennis Black, Iowa state representative

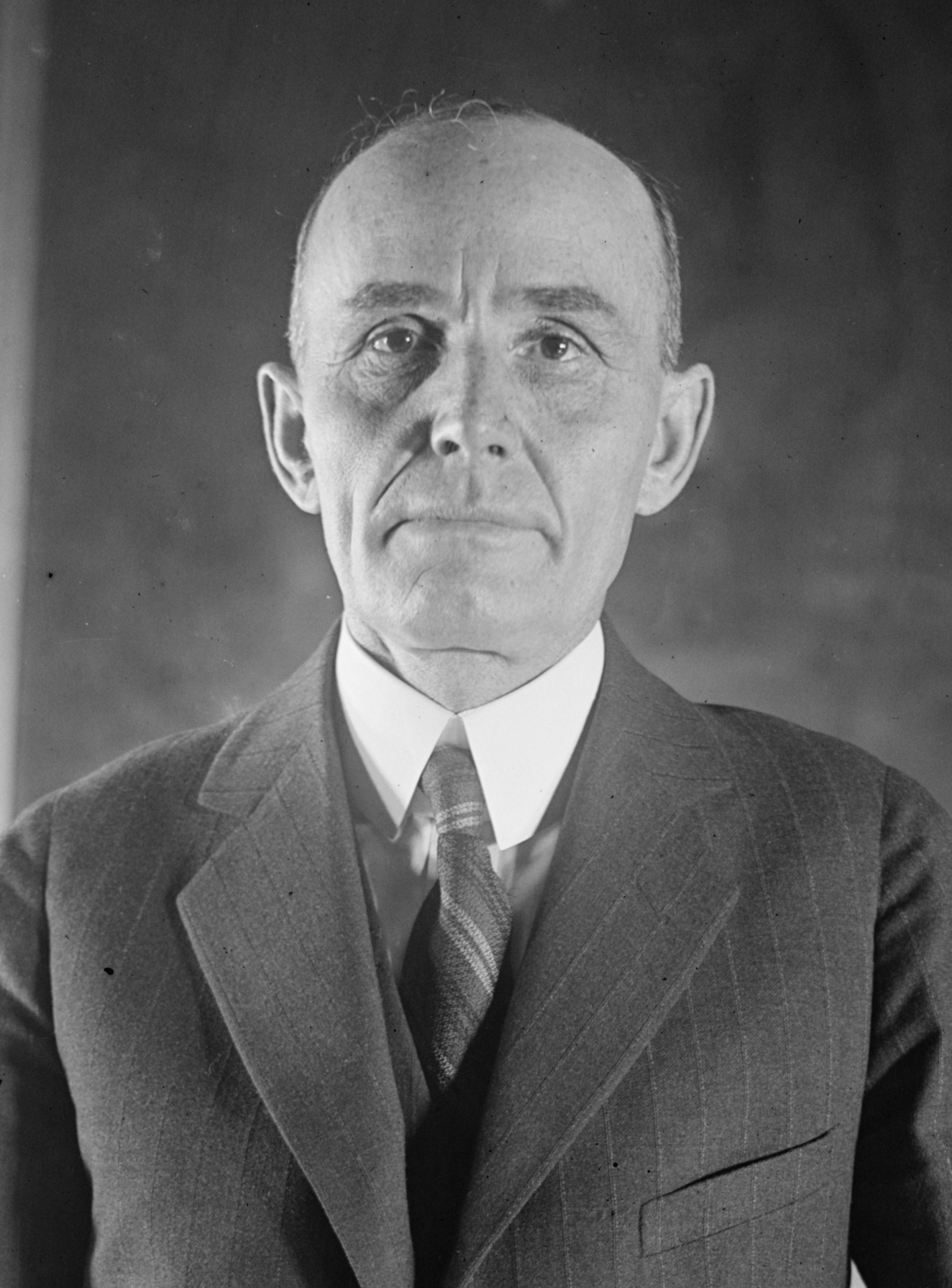
William Marion Jardine, secretary of agriculture (1925–1929); ambassador to Egypt (1930–1933)

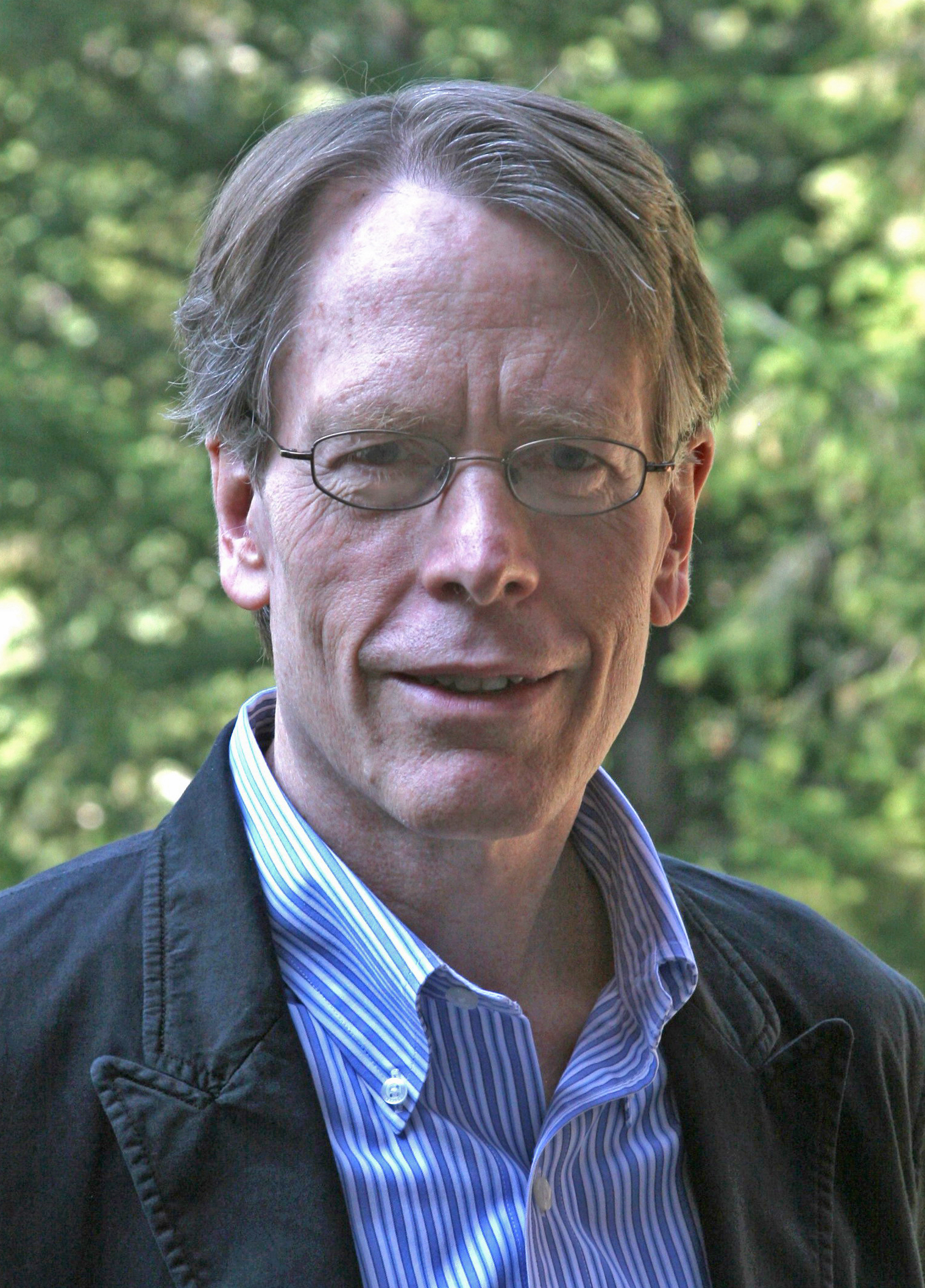
Lars Peter Hansen, B.S. 1974, Nobel laureate economist

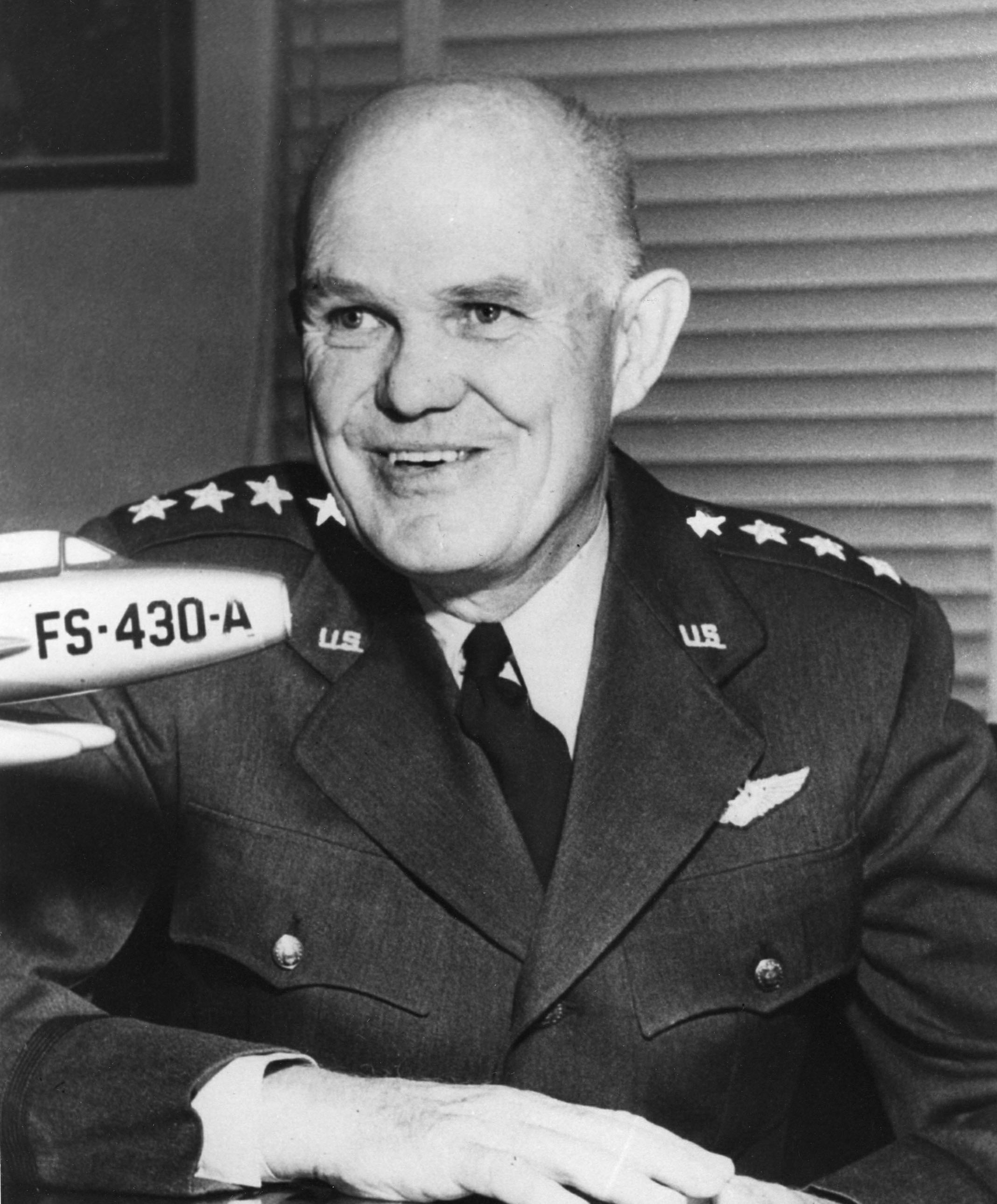
John K. Cannon, 1914, chief of United States Air Forces in Europe, namesake of Cannon Air Force Base

This list of Utah State University alumni includes notable graduates, non-graduate former students, and current students of Utah State University (USU), a public, land-grant, research university located in Logan, Utah. This list does not contain the names of presidents or faculty of the university, unless they also happen to be alumni.

Founded in 1888 under the Morrill Land-Grant Colleges Act as the Agricultural College of Utah, USU has grown to more than 28,000 students. Although it is headquartered in Logan, USU operates throughout the state of Utah through five regional campuses and more than 20 distance education sites. On June 13, 1899, graduates of the Agricultural College of Utah met to create the Alumni Association. Today, the Alumni Association is located in the historic David B. Haight Alumni Center, which was dedicated on July 11, 1991. Alumni chapters exist in Arizona, California, Colorado, Idaho, Nevada, Oregon, Utah, Washington, and Washington DC. USU boasts more than 180,000 alumni, who are found in every U.S. state and more than 100 countries.

== Activism ==
Name	Class year(s)	Degree(s)	Notability	Reference
Rick Bass	1979	B.S. Geology	Writer and environmental activist	
Gregory C. Carr	1982	B.S. History	Entrepreneur, human rights activist, and founder of the Gregory C. Carr Foundation, which supports human rights, education and the arts	
Steve Carr	1981	B.S.	First and only American elected to Standing Commission of the International Red Cross and Red Crescent Movement, the worldwide organization's highest governing body	
Sonia Johnson	1958	B.A. English	Feminist and writer	

== Business ==
Name	Class year(s)	Degree(s)	Notability	Reference
Nolan Bushnell			Founded Atari Inc. and the Chuck E. Cheese's chain	
Gregory C. Carr	1982	B.S. History	Entrepreneur; founded the company that first developed voice mail; chaired Prodigy, an early global ISP	
Charlie Denson	1978	B.S. Marketing	President of Nike Brand	
John Forzani	1971	B.S. Physical Education	Founder of Forzani Group, Canada's largest sporting goods retailer with 215 company-owned stores under the names Coast Mountain Sports, Sport Chek and Sport Mart	
Jason Lindsey	1995	B.A. M.A.	Co-founder and president of Overstock.com	
Dick Motta	1953	B.S. Physical Education	Owner of the Bluebird Inn in Logan and the Bluebird Inn Bed and Breakfast in Bear Lake, Utah; former NBA coach and color commentator; coach of Chicago Bulls, Washington Bullets and Dallas Mavericks; NBA Coach of the Year in 1971; won an NBA Championship while coaching the Washington Bullets	
Ward Parkinson	1969	B.S. Electrical Engineering	Founder of Micron Technology; VP of Commercial Development of Ovonyx, Inc.	
Gary E. Stevenson	1979	B.A.	Co-founder of ICON Health & Fitness	

== Education ==
Name	Class year(s)	Degree(s)	Notability	Reference
Caryn Beck-Dudley	1980	B.S. Political Science	Dean of the College of Business at Florida State University; first female dean of the Huntsman School of Business (2002–2005)	
Randy L. Bott	1970; 1975	B.S. M.S.	Named #1 Professor in the U.S. by RateMyProfessors.com	
Linda J. Eyre	1970	B.S.	Co-author, with her husband Richard Eyre, of 33 books on parenting, including New York Times #1 best seller Teaching Your Children Values; developed and founded Joy Schools preschool system	
Richard Eyre	1968	B.S.	Co-author, with his wife Linda J. Eyre, of 33 books on parenting, including New York Times #1 best seller Teaching Your Children Values; developed and founded Joy Schools preschool system	

== Government and politics ==
Name	Class year(s)	Degree(s)	Notability	Reference
Norah al-Faiz	1982	MEd	Deputy minister for Women's Education in Saudi Arabia; first woman appointed to ministerial post in Saudi Arabia	
Ezra Taft Benson			U.S. secretary of agriculture (1953–61)	
Dennis Black		B.S. Forest Management; M.S. Natural Resources Economics	Democratic politician, representing the 21st District in the Iowa Senate 1995–2015	
Laurence J. Burton	1956		Elected as a Republican to the eighty-eighth and to the three succeeding congresses (1963–1971)	
Kathleen Clark	1972	B.S. Political Science	First woman appointed director of the Bureau of Land Management (2002–07)	
George D. Clyde	1921	B.S.	10th governor of Utah (1957–65)	
Spencer Cox		B.A.	Lieutenant governor of Utah, governor of Utah (2021–present)	
Elizabeth Dowdeswell	1972	M.S. Behavioral Sciences	29th lieutenant governor of Ontario (2014–2023); executive director, United Nations Environment Programme (1993–98); Canada's permanent representative to the World Meteorological Organization; twice elected to its executive council	
John Gardner Ford	1975	B.S.	Son of former U.S. President Gerald Ford; attended USU during his presidency	
Steven Ford			Son of former U.S. President Gerald Ford; attended USU during his presidency	
Kenny Guinn	1970	Ed.D. Educational Administration	Former governor of Nevada	
Paula Hawkins			First woman elected to a full term in the U.S. Senate without a family connection (1981–87)	
William Marion Jardine	1925	PhD	U.S. Secretary of Agriculture (1925–1929); U.S. ambassador to Egypt	
Howard Jarvis			Anti-tax activist in California	
Wayne Johnson		History	Republican member of both houses, consecutively, of the Wyoming State Legislature, 1993–2017	
Lorna Kesterson		Journalism	Newspaper reporter and editor; first woman elected mayor of Henderson, Nevada (1985–1993)	
Evan Mecham			Governor of Arizona	
Michael W. Mosman	1981	B.S.	Federal district judge	
Harry Reid	1961	B.S. Political Science	Former U.S. senator, D-NV; former U.S. Senate majority leader; youngest lieutenant governor in Nevada's history	
Mike Simpson	1972	B.S.	U.S. House of Representatives, R-ID	
Marlon O. Snow			Member of the Utah House of Representatives	
Chris Stewart	1984	B.S.	U.S. House of Representatives, R-UT; New York Times best-selling author	
Ted Stewart	1972	B.S.	Federal district judge	
Jean Westwood			First female chair of the Democratic National Committee (1972)	
Ardeshir Zahedi	1950	B.S. Animal Science	Former Iranian minister of Foreign Affairs and ambassador to the United States	

== Humanities and fine arts ==
Name	Class year(s)	Degree(s)	Notability	Reference
Michael Ballam	1972	B.S. Music	Tenor; founder and director of the Utah Festival Opera; author of more than 30 publications and music recordings	
Rick Bass	1979		PEN/O. Henry Prize-winning novelist, essayist	
Reed Cowan	1998	B.S.	Emmy Award-winning journalist, documentary filmmaker	
Douglas Kent Hall			Writer and photographer	
Craig Jessop	1973	B.S.	Music director; former director of the Mormon Tabernacle Choir	
Don Quayle	1952; 1963	B.S. M.S.	First president of National Public Radio	
Bill Ransom	1998	M.A.	Science fiction writer; Stegner Fellow at Stanford	
Chip Rawlins	1974; 1983	B.S. M.S.	Non-fiction writer, poet	
Jan Shipps	1961	B.S.	Historian of Mormonism	
May Swenson	1934	B.S.	Poet; chancellor of Academy of American Poets	
Brad Teare			Painter and illustrator	
Gene Tobey	1965; 1967; 1969	A.A. B.F.A. M.F.A.	Artist; sculptor; teaches sculpture and three-dimensional design at USU Logan; namesake of Gene Tobey Memorial Art Scholarship Fund created by his wife Rebecca Tobey in 2006	
Mark Walton	1998	B.F.A.	Annie-nominated voice actor and story artist, known as the voice of "Rhino" in the movie Bolt	
Kevin Wasden	2008	B.A.	Science fiction and fantasy artist and illustrator	

== Military ==
Name	Class year(s)	Degree(s)	Notability	Reference
John K. Cannon	1914		Air commander-in-chief, Allied Air Forces, Mediterranean Theater of Operations, World War II; four-star general	
Peter Cooke	1971; 1973	Political Science	Retired major general; United States Army Reserves for 39 years	
Archer L. Durham	1960	B.S.	Major general, United States Air Force; first African American to command an Air Force Logistics Center; commanded 436th Military Airlift Wing at Dover Air Force Base	
Russell Maughan	1917		Pilot of first-ever dawn-to-dusk transcontinental flight across the United States	
Chase Nielsen	1939		Participant in Doolittle Raid, career U.S. Air Force officer	

== Religion ==
Name	Class year(s)	Degree(s)	Notability	Reference
Ezra Taft Benson			President of the Church of Jesus Christ of Latter-day Saints (LDS Church)	
Hugh B. Brown			Member of the First Presidency of the LDS Church	
Quentin L. Cook	1964	B.S.	Member of the Quorum of the Twelve Apostles of the LDS Church	
David B. Haight	1929		Member of the Quorum of the Twelve Apostles of the LDS Church	
W. Rolfe Kerr	1960; 1966	B.S. M.S.	Commissioner of Education of the LDS Church	
Boyd K. Packer	1949; 1953	B.S. M.S.	President of the LDS Church's Quorum of Twelve Apostles	
L. Tom Perry	1949	B.S. Business Administration	Member of the Quorum of Twelve Apostles of the LDS Church	
Jan Shipps	1961	B.S. History	Preeminent non-Mormon expert on Mormonism; professor emeritus of history and religious studies in the School of Liberal Arts at Indiana University-Purdue University	
Gary E. Stevenson	1979	B.S. Business Administration	Member of the Quorum of Twelve Apostles of the LDS Church	

== Science ==
Name	Class year(s)	Degree(s)	Notability	Reference
Nathan Baldwin			Inventor of headphones	
Mary L. Cleave	1975; 1980	M.S. Biology; Ph.D. Civil and Environmental Engineering	NASA astronaut	
Richard F. Daines	1974	B.S.	Commissioner of Health for New York State; head of the New York Department of Health	
Julia F. Knight	1964	B.S. Mathematics	Mathematician in model theory and computability theory at the University of Notre Dame, Fellow of the American Mathematical Society	
George Piranian	1937	B.S. Agriculture, M.S. Botany	Mathematician in complex analysis; founded the Michigan Mathematical Journal with Paul Erdős, Fritz Herzog and Arthur J. Lohwater	
Archimedes Plutonium	1979	MEd	As Ludwig van Ludvig, notable Usenet personality	
Julie A. Robinson	1989	B.S. Chemistry	Chief scientist of the International Space Station	
Gene P. Weckler	1958	B.S. Electrical Engineering	President of Rad-icon Imaging Corporation	
Ronny Woodruff	1972	Ph.D.	Professor of biological sciences at Bowling Green State University	
Shang Fa Yang	1963	Ph.D.	Research unlocked key to prolonging freshness in fruits and flowers; 1991 Wolf Prize in Agriculture, considered the "Nobel Prize of Agriculture"	

== Sports ==
Name	Class year(s)	Degree(s)	Notability	Reference
Lionel Aldridge			Former NFL defensive end, Green Bay Packers and San Diego Chargers	
Kent Baer	1974	B.S.	Former head football coach, Notre Dame; defensive coordinator at many universities	
Rick Baird	2000		US bobsled team, 1998–2003; forerunner during 2002 Winter Olympics	
Ed Berry			Former NFL and CFL All Star defensive back, Green Bay Packers	
Jay Don Blake			Professional golfer and PGA Tour winner	
Jim Boatwright	1974		American-Israeli basketball player; won two Euroleague championships with Israel's Maccabi Tel Aviv	
Clyde Brock	1962	B.S.	Former CFL All-Star offensive tackle	
Anthony Calvillo			All-time leading passer and star quarterback in the Canadian Football League	
Mike Connelly	1959		Former NFL center, Dallas Cowboys	
Chris Cooley			Two-time NFL Pro Bowl tight end, currently with the Washington Redskins	
Kevin Curtis	2003	B.S.	NFL wide receiver, currently with the Philadelphia Eagles	
Chuck Detwiler			Former NFL and WFL player	
LaVell Edwards	1952	B.S. Physical Education	College Football Hall of Fame coach; head coach of 1984 National Champion BYU Cougars	
Kyle Fiat			Professional lacrosse player, Philadelphia Wings	
Gar Forman	1984	B.S.	Current general manager, Chicago Bulls	
Bob Gagliano	1981		Former NFL and USFL quarterback	
Hal Garner	1985		Former linebacker, Buffalo Bills	
Jim Garrett	1951		Former NFL coach and scout	
Tay Glover-Wright			CFL cornerback for Ottawa Redblacks, formerly with Calgary Stampeders, formerly NFL cornerback for Indianapolis Colts	
Cornell Green	1962		Former NFL All-Pro defensive back, Dallas Cowboys; played basketball at USU	
Donnie Henderson	1986	B.S.	Former defensive coordinator, New York Jets and Detroit Lions	
Eric Hipple	1980	B.S.	Former starting NFL quarterback, Detroit Lions	
Jim Hough	1978	B.S.	Former offensive lineman, Minnesota Vikings	
Phil Johnson	1963; 1965	B.S. M.S.	Former NBA head coach; currently longtime assistant coach, Utah Jazz; named NBA's top assistant coach three times	
Rulon Jones	1987	B.S.	Former NFL defensive lineman, Denver Broncos; AFC Defensive Player of the Year, 1986	
Micah Knorr	1997	B.S.	Former NFL punter, Dallas Cowboys, and Denver Broncos	
Greg Kragen	2005	B.S.	Former NFL Pro Bowl defensive tackle, Denver Broncos, Kansas City Chiefs, and Carolina Panthers	
Travis LaBoy		B.S.	Former NFL linebacker	
MacArthur Lane	2003	B.S.	Former NFL Pro Bowl running back	
Jordan Love	2021 (Note: Graduating class of 2021, but did not complete his senior year in order to enter the 2020 NFL draft)		NFL quarterback, Green Bay Packers	
Dick Motta	1953	B.S. Physical Education	One of top 10 winningest NBA head coaches of all time; NBA Coach of the Year, 1971; head coach of 1978 NBA champion Washington Bullets; owner of the Bluebird Inn in Logan and the Bluebird Inn Bed and Breakfast in Bear Lake, Utah; former NBA coach and color commentator; Coach of Chicago Bulls, Washington Bullets and Dallas Mavericks; NBA Coach of the Year in 1971; won an NBA Championship while coaching the Washington Bullets	
Merlin Olsen	1962; 1971	B.S. Finance; M.S.	College and Pro Football Hall of Fame defensive tackle; later NFL analyst and TV personality; selected to 14 Pro Bowls; 1974 NFL MVP; actor, Little House on the Prairie and Father Murphy	
Phil Olsen	1970	B.S.	Former NFL center and defensive tackle, Boston Patriots, Los Angeles Rams, Denver Broncos, and Buffalo Bills	
Donald Penn	2005	B.S.	NFL offensive tackle, Washington Redskins Formerly Tampa Bay Buccaneers, and Oakland Raiders	
Marv Roberts	1970	B.S.	Former ABA basketball player	
Len Rohde	1960	B.S.	Former NFL Pro Bowl tackle, San Francisco 49ers	
Roy Shivers	1966		Former NFL running back, CFL head coach and general manager	
Jay Silvester	1959; 1971	B.S. M.S.	Four-time Olympian discus thrower, silver medal (1972); broke world record four times; first to throw 60 meters	
Al Smith		B.S.	Former NFL linebacker, Houston Oilers	
Robert Turbin	2011		Former NFL tailback, Seattle Seahawks, Cleveland Browns, Dallas Cowboys, and Indianapolis Colts; Super Bowl champion (XLVIII)	
Bobby Wagner	2011	B.S.	NFL linebacker, Seattle Seahawks; Super Bowl champion (XLVIII)	

== Miscellaneous ==
Name	Class year(s)	Degree(s)	Notability	Reference
Freddy Deeb			Professional poker player, World Series of Poker	
Mark Hofmann			Author of the Salamander letter; convicted murderer	
Tyler James Robinson	2021		Alleged assassin of conservative activist Charlie Kirk	
