= Podcast Awards =

Annual global awards

- Awarded for: Excellence in podcasting
- Date: 2005
- Presented by: New Media Expo
- Website: http://www.podcastawards.com/

The People's Choice Podcast Awards, better known as the Podcast Awards, are global awards given annually to the best podcasts as voted by the general public. Founded in 2005 by Todd Cochrane of Podcast Connect Inc., the Podcast Awards changed hands for a short period by New Media Expo in September 2014 until New Media Expo's demise. The first Podcast Awards show was held in 2006 (awarding shows for the 2005 calendar year) had over 350,000 people vote for their nominated podcasts, with nearly 1000 people attending the awards ceremony. The 10th annual Podcast Awards Show, the first show run exclusively by the New Media Expo, took place at Westgate Las Vegas Resort and Casino on April 14, 2015. It was hosted by Chris Jericho and Emily Morse. The 12th Annual event started with a complete site rebuild and change to the overall process.

== Rules ==
The nominations begin on a set date (July 1, 2017 for the 2017 awards) and continue for thirty days. Listeners can nominate shows from 20 categories over the 30 day period once a day. Podcasts have had to pre-register in order to participate and listeners are allowed to select the shows they want to nominate from within the pre-registered list of shows.

After the thirty days of nominations, Podcast Connect Committee will review all the nominations over a 15-day period and a slate announced.

Once up to ten nominees in each category have been established, the final voting slate is released. Voting in this round are selected by a panel of judges as outlined in the podcast awards rule.

== Categories and winners ==
The Podcast Awards consists of twenty-two categories. Winners are announced during a ceremony which includes a live web stream. The prizes awarded to winners are donation/sponsor-driven via PayPal. In 2009, they were able to award podcasters almost $3,500 in prizes, with additional website exposure through 2009–2010 of seventeen million plus hits.

Categories	2005	2006	2007	2008	2009	2010	2011	2012	2013	2015†
People's Choice	This Week in Tech	MuggleCast	Keith and The Girl	Manager Tools	ESPN: Fantasy Focus Football	Tell 'Em Steve Dave!	4Player Podcast	ESPN: Fantasy Focus Football	The Morning Stream	Rob Has a Podcast
Best Produced	Daily Source Code	The Signal	Firefly Talk	Totally Rad Show	Best of the Left	Radiolab	Inside the Magic	Best of the Left	Rob Has a Podcast	Radiolab
Best Video Podcast	—N/a	—N/a	Ask a Ninja	Geek Brief TV	This Week in Tech	TED	This Week In Tech	The Young Turks	Rob Has a Podcast	Night Attack
Best Mobile Podcast	—N/a	Catholic Insider	Xbox 360	DL.TV	AppSlappy	—N/a	—N/a	—N/a	—N/a	—N/a
Arts	—N/a	Geek Nights with Rym and Scott	This American Life	This American Life	Imprint	Decoder Ring Theatre	This American Life	The Moth	This American Life	This American Life
Business	Media Artist Secrets	Manager Tools	Manager Tools	Manager Tools	Planet Money	Career Tools	Planet Money	Manager Tools	NPR: Planet Money Podcast	Freakonomics Radio
Comedy	Distorted View Daily	Distorted View Daily	Nobody Likes Onions	You Look Nice Today	Daily Giz Wiz	Tell 'Em Steve-Dave!	WTF with Marc Maron	WTF with Marc Maron	The Morning Stream	The Morning Stream
Education	Tips from the Top Floor	Tips from the Top Floor	Grammar Girl	Grammar Girl	The Skeptics' Guide to the Universe	The History of Rome	Stuff You Missed in History	Grammar Girl	Grammar Girl	Hardcore History
Entertainment	—N/a	Pottercast	The Lost Podcast with Jay and Jack	MuggleCast	MuggleCast	The Fringe Podcast	The Morning Stream	Rob Has a Podcast	Walking Dead 'Cast	Rob Has a Podcast
Food and Drink	Good Beer Show	Good Beer Show	CoffeeGeek	Grace before meals	Munchcast	BeerDownload	The Splendid Table	The Beerists	The Beerists	The Alton Browncast
Games & Hobbies	Orange Lounge Radio	Podtacular	CAGcast	The Instance	4Player Podcast	4Player Podcast	4Player Podcast	Rooster Teeth Podcast	Rooster Teeth Podcast	The Instance
General	illinoise!	Rosary Army	ShowGirls	Extralife Radio	This American Life	The Survival Podcast	Greetings From Nowhere	Internet Box	Internet Box	Internet Box
LGBTQ	—N/a	Feast of Fools	Feast of Fools	Feast of Fools	Feast of Fun	Savage Love	Feast of Fun	Throwing Shade	Throwing Shade	Psychobabble / Throwing Shade
Health	MARINA's Walking & Aerobics"	Sex is Fun!	Sex is Fun!	Healthy Catholic	QuackCast	QuackCast	QuackCast	The Mental Illness Happy Hour	The Fat Burning Man	The Dr. Drew Podcast
Mature	Dawn and Drew Show	Dawn and Drew Show	Keith and the Girl	Distorted View Daily	Adam Carolla Podcast	WTF with Marc Maron	SModcast	Savage Lovecast	Savage Lovecast	Night Attack
Music	—N/a	Accident Hash	Catholic Rockers	Catholic Rockers	Irish Celtic Music Podcast	Irish & Celtic Music Podcast	Coverville	Coverville	Coverville	Coverville
News & Politics	Free Talk Live	Free Talk Live	Free Talk Live	Free Talk Live	The Young Turks	Free Talk Live	The Majority Report	The Majority Report	The Majority Report	The Majority Report
Religion & Spirituality	Catholic Insider	Daily Breakfast	Daily Breakfast	Daily Breakfast	Reasonable Doubts	Atheist News Podcast	Mormon FAIR-Cast	Ardent Atheist with Emery Emery	Mormon FAIR-Cast	The Scathing Atheist
Science & Medicine*	—N/a	—N/a	—N/a	—N/a	—N/a	The Skeptics' Guide to the Universe	The Skeptics' Guide to the Universe	The Skeptics' Guide to the Universe	Radiolab	The Skeptics' Guide to the Universe
Sports & Recreation	1954 and Counting	Fantoo Girls	Phedippidations	SkyDiverGirlsTv	ESPN: Fantasy Focus Football	The B.S. Report	ESPN: Fantasy Focus Football	ESPN: Fantasy Focus Football	ESPN: Fantasy Focus Baseball	ESPN: Fantasy Focus Football
Technology*	This Week In Tech	Diggnation	Security Now	This Week in Tech	Security Now	This Week In Tech	Tech News Today	The Audacity to Podcast	Tech News Today	Daily Tech News Show
Travel	Richard Vobes Radio Show	Mouse Tunes	WDW Radio	WDW Radio	WDW Radio	WDW Radio	WDW Radio	WDW Radio	WDW Radio	WDW Radio
TV & Film*	TheForce.net	The Signal	Firefly Talk	The Signal	Spill.com	Doug Loves Movies	Film Sack	Spill.com	Film Sack	Film Sack

†The Podcast Awards were not held in 2014.
*Prior to 2010, Science and Technology were combined as one category.

Categories	2016	2017	2018	2019	2020	2024
People's Choice	The Fantasy Footballers	The Fantasy Footballers	The Fantasy Footballers	The Fantasy Footballers	How Did I Get Here?	Let's Get Haunted
Arts	The Beerist Podcast	We Like Drinking	We Like Drinking	Dads Drinking Bourbon	Dads Drinking Bourbon	Comic Book Club News
Asian Hosted						CHECK YOUR HEAD: Mental Help for Musicians
Black Hosted						2 Nerds In A Pod: A Video Game Podcast
Business	The Bizarre Briefing	Dreamers Podcast	Extraordinary Women Radio	Big Girl Money	Wickedly Smart Women	—N/a
Comedy	Matt and Mattinglys Ice Cream Social	Plumbing the Death Star	2 Girls on a Bench	Spitballers Podcast	Spitballers Podcast	And That's Why We Drink
Education	Scam School	Grammar Girl	Our Fake History	Goodnight Stories for Rebel Girls	Curiosity Daily	—N/a
Entertainment	We Have Concerns	We're Drunk & We Know Things	We're Drunk & We Know Things	We're Drunk & We Know Things	How Did I Get Here?	Baby Mamas No Drama
Female Hosted						Let's Get Haunted
Games & Hobbies	The Angry Chicken	Trivial Warfare	Trivial Warfare	The Reasons I'm Broke	Things I Got Wong at Trivia	2 Nerds In A Pod: A Video Game Podcast
Government & Organizations	Politics Politics Politics	Everyday Superhumans	Democracy Works	The Impact	Outrage+Optimism!	—N/a
Health	Sleep with Me	Optimal Living Daily	A Better Night's Sleep	Mental - The Podcast to Destigmatise Mental Health	Mental - The Podcast to Destigmatise Mental Health	Sh!t That Goes On In Our Heads
Hosted in Spanish						El Flow Segunda Temporada
Kids & Family	Hypothetical Help	What Fresh Hell: Laughing in the Face of Motherhood	Cool Facts About Animals	Mommies Tell All	Fairy Tales with Granny MacDuff	Didn't I Just Feed You
LGBTQ	Diary of a Trans Woman	Derek and Romaine	Derek and Romaine	If These Ovaries Could Talk	Derek and Romaine	The Queer Family Podcast
Male Hosted						MrBallen's Medical Mysteries
Mature	JuRY	Between Us Girls	Turn Me On	—N/a	—N/a	—N/a
Music	Joe and Meg's Musical Adventure	Irish & Celtic Music Podcast	The Modern Vinyl Podcast	Switched on Pop	Kpop Daebak w/ Eric Nam	—N/a
Politics & News	No Agenda	The Majority Report with Sam Seder	Consider This	Today Explained	True Crime DEADLINE	Vibes Only
Podcast Listening Platform						Spotify
Religion & Spirituality	Oh No Ross and Carrie	Five Minute Devotions	For the Love with Jen Hatmaker	Better Work Bitch!	Better Work Bitch!	—N/a
Science & Medicine*	Weird Things	STEM-Talk	Curiosity Daily	STEM-Talk	DNA Today: A Genetics Podcast	ADHD Mums
Society – Culture	The Phileas Club	Sword and Scale	Travel Oddities	The Brain Candy Podcast	Once Upon a Crime	—N/a
Sports	The Fantasy Footballers	The Fantasy Footballers	The Fantasy Footballers	30 for 30 Podcasts	The Fantasy Footballers	Fantasy Football Today
Storyteller & Drama	—N/a	—N/a	—N/a	Real Life Real Crime	Crime Junkie	—N/a
Technology*	Hak5	School of Podcasting	Why'd You Push That Button?	Why'd You Push That Button?	School of Podcasting	Women In STEM Podcast
TV & Film*	Post Show Recaps	The Hollywood Outsider	Agents of S.H.I.E.LD. Podcast	Ellen on the Go	Commit or Quit	80s TV Ladies

Podcast awards are awarded for the previous calendar year. For example, the 2014 awards ceremony took place on April 14, 2015.

=== One-time awards ===
- 2005 – Music/Radio: Coverville
- 2005 – Nonenglish: Annik Rubens: Schlaflos in München
- 2005 – Top Rated: Slice of SciFi
- 2005 – World News: Kathleen Keating
- 2006 – Best Podcast directory: Apple iTunes

== Criticism ==
Some critics have complained that the Podcast Awards lack publicity, which results in the same podcasts winning awards every year. While some podcasters are aware of the awards and mobilize their listeners to vote, many do not realize they exist. In response to criticism, the Podcast Awards implemented various changes over the years including stricter entry requirements, category revisions, and technical improvements. Despite ongoing debates, it remains one of the longest-running podcast-specific awards globally and helped spotlight early independent podcasters during a formative era of the medium.

== See also ==
- List of web awards
