= List of Nash Bridges episodes =

The following is a complete episode list of 1990s and 2000s police procedural television series Nash Bridges. In the United States, the show aired on CBS from 1996 to 2001. There are a total of 122 episodes. Nash Bridges starred Don Johnson and Cheech Marin.

== Series overview ==
| Season | Episodes | Originally released | |
| Season | Episodes | First released | Last released |
|---|---|---|---|
| 1 | 8 | March 29, 1996 | May 17, 1996 |
| 2 | 23 | September 13, 1996 | May 2, 1997 |
| 3 | 23 | September 19, 1997 | May 15, 1998 |
| 4 | 24 | September 25, 1998 | May 14, 1999 |
| 5 | 22 | September 24, 1999 | May 19, 2000 |
| 6 | 22 | October 6, 2000 | May 4, 2001 |

== Episodes ==
=== Season 1 (1996) ===
| No. overall | No. in season | Title | Directed by | Written by | Original release date | Prod. code | Viewers (millions) |
|---|---|---|---|---|---|---|---|
| 1 | 1 | "Genesis" | Peter Werner | Carlton Cuse | March 29, 1996 | 101 | 14.1 |
Nash poses as an undercover computer chip buyer to bust a black market criminal ring that recently stole $2 million worth of the chips. Guest starring: Cheech Marin, Lucy Liu, Mary Mara, Mark Pellegrino as Ferguson and Daniel Roebuck as Rick Bettina
| 2 | 2 | "Home Invasion" | Tucker Gates | Reed Steiner | March 30, 1996 | 102 | 14.7 |
A ruthless home invasion gang brutally attacks a Chinese family, killing the father, a move that confuses Nash and the SIU. Guest starring: Paula Marshall, and James Hong as Terrance, a Chinese crime boss.
| 3 | 3 | "Skirt Chasers" | Greg Beeman | Carlton Cuse | April 5, 1996 | 103 | 14.4 |
Nash and Joe find themselves on the trail of a heroin dealer after Joe is forced to re-join the SIU due to a pension dispute.
| 4 | 4 | "High Impact" | Greg Beeman | Michael Norell | April 12, 1996 | 104 | 13.0 |
Nash and the SIU team respond to a bomb threat against Mayor Bobbie Werksman. In a tenement, they find the bomb, but accidentally trigger the timer. Guest starring: James Gammon, Angela Dohrmann, and Daniel Roebuck as Rick Bettina
| 5 | 5 | "The Javelin Catcher" | Colin Bucksey | Jed Seidel | April 19, 1996 | 105 | 12.4 |
While investigating a gang shootout, Nash discovers that the weapon used for the job is the Army's recently disappeared man-portable, anti-tank system: The Javelin. Guest starring: RuPaul, Geraldine Leer, Mary Mara, Clarence Clemons Special guest star: Martin Ferrero
| 6 | 6 | "Vanishing Act" | Ken Fink | Michael Norell | April 26, 1996 | 106 | 11.9 |
On the way to an undercover purchase of some heavy industrial equipment from some Russian gangsters and carrying $500,000 of the city's money, Inspector Harvey Leek vanishes, and the money vanishes with him. Guest starring: James Gammon, Mary Mara
| 7 | 7 | "Aloha, Nash" | Jim Manera | Jed Seidel | May 3, 1996 | 107 | 10.3 |
A high-priority case begins the day Nash plans to take a belated honeymoon with ex-wife Kelly, putting him on the trail of San Francisco's most notorious bookie and renegade FBI officer, #9 on the Most-Wanted List. Also starring: Daniel Roebuck as Rick Bettina Guest starring: Clarence Clemons Special guest star: Giancarlo Esposito
| 8 | 8 | "Key Witness" | Robert Ginty | Carlton Cuse & Reed Steiner | May 17, 1996 | 108 | 8.3 |
Lisa witnesses a murder, but there is no evidence afterward to prove what she saw. Guest starring: William Atherton Special appearance by: Valerie Perrine

=== Season 2 (1996–97) ===
| No. overall | No. in season | Title | Directed by | Written by | Original release date | Prod. code | Viewers (millions) |
|---|---|---|---|---|---|---|---|
| 9 | 1 | "Internal Affairs" | Greg Beeman | Brad Kern | September 13, 1996 | 109 | 9.9 |
Nash and the SIU find themselves chasing after renegade Internal Affairs cops after unwittingly triggering one of their investigations. Guest starring: J. E. Freeman, Angela Dohrmann, Jeanne Mori Special appearance by: Valerie Perrine.
| 10 | 2 | "'Til Death Do Us Part" | Greg Beeman | Carlton Cuse | September 20, 1996 | 201 | 12.9 |
Joe is exposed to a dangerous virus at a bio-lab, which is a crime scene of a drug theft in which the thief was also exposed, threatening the entire city. The SIU must find the thief, who also has the virus's cure. Note: episode was shown very much out of production order (and intended broadcast order) as it shows the SIU moving onto the ferryboat Eureka, but in the next four episodes the SIU is still in the old bank rotunda. Guest starring: Christopher Rich, Yvette Nipar, Richard Edson, Grand L. Bush, Freda Foh Shen, Bette Ford Guest cameo by: Geraldo Rivera as himself
| 11 | 3 | "The Great Escape" | Greg Beeman | Carlton Cuse & Michael Norell | September 27, 1996 | 110 | 12.0 |
Nash must track down two escapees from a hijacked bus full of San Quentin prisoners, one being a para-military activist who seeks bitter revenge on Nash. Guest starring: Nick Searcy, Chi McBride, Réal Andrews, Ashley Gardner, Esther Scott, Peter Van Norden
| 12 | 4 | "Wrecking Crew" | David Jackson | Carlton Cuse | October 4, 1996 | 111 | 14.4 |
While a professional robber and his crew hit San Francisco and conduct a series of crimes, Nash slips into the role of private eye as he hunts down the missing car of the San Francisco Giant. Guest starring: Vyto Ruginis, John Pyper-Ferguson, Robert Kerbeck Special guest star: Mary Mara, Barry Bonds as Rondell
| 13 | 5 | "Trackdown" | Melanie Mayron | Reed Steiner & Jed Seidel | October 11, 1996 | 112 | 12.2 |
A world-renowned hit-man has been hired to kill the chief witness in a far reaching drug prosecution. However, this man is Nash's childhood friend gone wrong. Guest starring: Mary Mara, Shawn Michael Howard, Kristin Minter, Michael Marich Special guest star: William Russ as Scott Lamont/"The Monk"
| 14 | 6 | "The Brothers McMillan" | Kenneth Fink | Reed Steiner & Jed Seidel | October 18, 1996 | 113 | 11.1 |
Nash and Joe trail two brothers who are heirs to a Mafia family; to make matters things worse, one of them used to be involved with Kelly. Guest starring: Markus Flanagan, Joe Chrest, Tony Longo Special guest star: Harve Presnell as Corick McMillan Special appearance by: Valerie Perrine; First appearance of: Patrick Fischler as Pepe; final appearance of: Serena Scott Thomas as Kelly, until episode 3.17 (though she is credited in episode 2.7 she doesn't appear).
| 15 | 7 | "Night Train" | Vern Gillum | Gay Walch | October 25, 1996 | 202 | 11.5 |
While on their way home, Nash and his fellow SIU cops are caught in the middle of an extremely dangerous train heist. Guest starring: Paula Marshall, Kevin Gage, Michael Jace, Troy Bryant, Eric Winzenreid, Brittany Murphy, and Currie Graham (NYPD Blue).
| 16 | 8 | "Zodiac" | Tucker Gates | Reed Steiner | November 1, 1996 | 203 | 11.0 |
While Joe goes undercover to capture a drug dealer, Nash goes head-to-head with the notorious San Francisco serial killer: Zodiac, who has not made an appearance in twenty years. Guest starring: Dakin Matthews, Ray McKinnon Note: This is Cary-Hiroyuki Tagawa's last appearance on the show.
| 17 | 9 | "Leo's Big Score" | Melanie Mayron | Jed Seidel | November 8, 1996 | 204 | 12.1 |
Nash is stuck with an eleven-year-old delinquent who's the link to busting a drug kingpin, while Joe is reunited with his own son, J.J. Guest starring: Robert Ri'chard, Marco Rodríguez, Eric Allan Kramer, Caroline Lagerfelt, Patrick Fischler, Stephen Berra
| 18 | 10 | "Hit Parade" | Greg Beeman | John Wirth | November 22, 1996 | 205 | 10.0 |
Nash and Joe find themselves striking a deal with gangland money launderer Carlos Casas, offering him freedom in exchange for his testimony. Guest starring: Shaun Toub, Caroline Lagerfelt, Kirk B.R. Woller Special guest star: Tracey Walter as Angel, in his first appearance as Nash's Guardian Angel Special appearances by: Donna Pescow as herself, and Kate Vernon as Whitney Thomas
| 19 | 11 | "Promised Land" | Scott Brazil | Morgan Gendel | November 22, 1996 | 206 | 11.8 |
Nash and Joe must help and follow a police custody escapee named David Chung, who seeks bitter revenge when his parents are murdered. Guest starring: Angela Dohrmann, Maria O'Brien, Michael Paul Chan, Vien Hong, Diana Bellamy, George Cheung and Kate Vernon as Whitney Thomas
| 20 | 12 | "25 Hours of Christmas" | Whitney Ransick | Jed Seidel | December 13, 1996 | 207 | 9.8 |
The SIU team is trapped at the office on Christmas Eve, as they finish wrapping up a murder investigation and prostitution case. Joe freaks when Nash's 'Cuda is stolen while he is getting it detailed. Guest starring: Frank Medrano, Cristine Rose, Gareth Williams, Samantha Smith Special guest stars: Clarence Clemens, Tracey Walter and Kate Vernon as Whitney Thomas
| 21 | 13 | "Road Work" | Greg Beeman | Pam Veasey | January 3, 1997 | 208 | 12.86 |
Nash and Joe realize that there is a leak in the prosecution team as they escort a key witness who has joined the Witness Protection Program to San Francisco, while Cassidy decides to go out with J.J. (Stephen Berra) Guest starring: Angela Dohrmann, Stephen Berra, Louis Mandylor, Hannah Cox, Larry Joshua, Jack Shearer, Dale Raoul and David Wells
| 22 | 14 | "Inside Out" | Neal Israel | Andrew Dettman & Daniel Truly | January 10, 1997 | 209 | 11.46 |
Joe goes undercover inside State Prison to bring down a ruthless Mexican gang leader who put out a hit (from behind bars) on a SFPD undercover cop who had infiltrated the Mexican Mafia. Nash runs the investigation on the outside, hoping to fulfill a promise to the dead man's widow by catching the trigger man. Naturally he'll have to overcome a distraction caused by Nick, who, while putting together his will, discovers some long-forgotten wealth. Guest starring: Angela Dohrmann, Badja Djola, Eloy Casados, Caroline Lagerfelt, Ada Maris, Richard Yniguez and Kate Vernon as Whitney Thomas
| 23 | 15 | "The Counterfeiters" | Tucker Gates | Story : Patrick Dillon; Story & teleplay : Carlton Cuse & Jed Seidel | January 24, 1997 | 210 | 15.18 |
Nash and the SIU uncover a counterfeitering group where the money is top-of-the-line Supernote quality. Moving in to bust the group, they discover a fake SIU gang impersonating the police. Cooperation becomes tense as suspicions abound over who and what to trust. In the interim, as Nick gets in over his head financially with his horse costs, Nash reluctantly agrees to work with Joe on an off-duty case searching for a Super Bowl ring. However, Nash and Joe soon find themselves impersonating a gay couple as the case develops differently from Nash's expectations. Guest starring: John Diehl, Stephen Lee as Tony B., Sherman Howard, Patrick Fischler Special appearances by: Russ Tamblyn, and Kate Vernon as Whitney Thomas
| 24 | 16 | "The Web" | Frederick K. Keller | Reed Steiner | January 31, 1997 | 211 | 13.59 |
Nash busts computer hacker/robber, Andy, and discovers Andy's committed the crime because his wife has been kidnapped. The crew of crooks want Andy's hacker skills as their ransom. The SIU must work to save the woman and bring down the crew before their daring daytime robbery is successful. Meanwhile, Nash and Whitney finally consummate their relationship. Guest starring: Gabriel Dell Jr., Titus Welliver, Randy Vasquez and Kate Vernon as Whitney Thomas
| 25 | 17 | "Knockout" | Greg Beeman | Morgan Gendel | February 7, 1997 | 212 | 12.74 |
Nash's sister, Stacy (Angela Dohrmann), is robbed, forcing her to come out of the closet as a lesbian. Nash deals with his own secret romance with Nick's nurse Whitney. The fallout from these family revelations takes place while Nash tracks down a kinky couple responsible for the robberies. Guest starring: Angela Dohrmann, Tamara Mark, Brad William Henke, Tom Virtue, Ryan Alosio, with Robert Carradine and Kate Vernon as Whitney Thomas Special guest star: Traci Lords
| 26 | 18 | "Gun Play" | Whitney Ransick | John Wirth | February 14, 1997 | 213 | 12.48 |
When Cassidy is shot by a stray bullet at school, Nash and Joe hunt down a dealer who has been selling guns to teenagers. Guest starring: Matthew Lillard, Paolo Seganti, David Lander, Carlos Leon, Marla Adams
| 27 | 19 | "Rampage" | Scott Brazil | Jed Seidel | February 21, 1997 | 214 | 12.23 |
When James and Lorraine, a wild couple, go on a crime spree, Nash must hunt them down while dealing with Cassidy's half-nude photo being displayed all over town on a safe-sex poster. Guest starring: Thomas Wilson Brown, Boti Bliss, Carlos Leon, Max Martini Special guest star: Glenn Frey
| 28 | 20 | "Out of Chicago" | Greg Beeman | Carlton Cuse | March 28, 1997 | 215 | 12.19 |
Hot on the trail of a murderous criminal from Chicago, Nash teams up with Karen Decker (Melinda Clarke), a cop from the Windy City who's in every way his equal: smart, competent-and yes, sexy. Sparks fly between them as they track down the visiting villain together - until, that is, Nash learns his newfound partner is not as perfect as she's led him to believe. Joe, meanwhile, hires a pet psychologist to cure what ails Nick's racehorse, Mr. Woody. Guest starring: Melinda Clarke, Stephen Berra, Tony Genaro, Francis Guinan, Aaron Lustig, Don Stroud, Richard McGregor
| 29 | 21 | "Moving Target" | Scott Brazil | Reed Steiner | April 11, 1997 | 216 | 11.41 |
Nash's old nemesis from the SIU, Rick Bettina (Daniel Roebuck), now a bounty hunter, is back and in competition with Nash as they both try to track down mobster Ray Goetz (Louis Mandylor), who Bettina wants on assault and battery charges in Vegas, and Nash suspects of "hitting" a high-level mob boss. Meanwhile, Joe fears repercussions from Inger after losing his wedding ring. Guest starring: Caroline Lagerfelt, Tim Ransom, John Kapelos, Ed O'Ross, Shannon Whirry and Daniel Roebuck as Rick Bettina Special guest stars: Louis Mandylor
| 30 | 22 | "Wild Card" | Greg Beeman | Carlton Cuse & John Wirth | April 25, 1997 | 217 | 13.98 |
Nash solves murders in Chinatown and helps out an old friend, Cedrick Hawks, a professional gambler who is in San Francisco to clear up a bad debt. Guest starring: Meat Loaf, James Pax, Don Stroud and Tommy Chong as Barry Chen Special guest star: Philip Michael Thomas
| 31 | 23 | "Deliverance" | Albert Magnoli | Reed Steiner & Jed Seidel | May 2, 1997 | 218 | 10.97 |
Nash and Joe butt heads with the leader of a team of Urban Commandos who has been hired to protect an inner-city community. While awaiting the birth of the new baby, Joe searches for the family crib that he lent to Nash seventeen years ago. Guest starring: Caroline Lagerfelt, Douglas Spain and Karmin Murcelo Special appearances by: Stella Stevens, and Dean Norris as William Robard.

=== Season 3 (1997–98) ===
| No. overall | No. in season | Title | Directed by | Written by | Original release date | Prod. code | Viewers (millions) |
|---|---|---|---|---|---|---|---|
| 32 | 1 | "Lost and Found" | Adam Nimoy | Carlton Cuse & John Wirth | September 19, 1997 | 301 | 12.20 |
Nash and Joe help FBI Special Agent Katz recover stolen FBI weapons. Joe sets Nash up on a blind date with his nanny. Guest starring: Christopher Rich, Susan Walters, John Hawkes, Rodney Eastman, Douglas J. Champa, Hunter Vo and Kelly Hu
| 33 | 2 | "Payback" | Julian Chojnacki | John Wirth | September 26, 1997 | 218 | 12.66 |
Willie Nelson plays Earl Dobbs, a convict who gets a furlough from San Quentin to help Nash and Joe catch his former crime partner. Guest starring: Tobin Bell, Eric Pierpoint, Shannon Tweed, Courtney Gains, Amy Leland, M.C. Gainey Special guest star: Willie Nelson
| 34 | 3 | "Shake, Rattle & Roll" | John McPherson | Carlton Cuse & John Wirth | October 3, 1997 | 301 | 11.52 |
Nash and Joe track down a former mob underboss who's murdering San Francisco criminals. Meanwhile, Inger has to go out of town, leaving Nash and Joe with the baby. Guest starring: Jennifer O'Neill, Joe Cortese, Lee Garington, Patrick Fischler and Caroline Lagerfelt Special guest star: Louis Mandylor Note: Final appearance of Mary Mara in the series.
| 35 | 4 | "One Flew Over the 'Cuda's Nest" | Robert Mandel | Reed Steiner & Jed Seidel | October 10, 1997 | 302 | 11.97 |
Nash and Joe follow the trail of a criminally insane mental patient who believes he is the nemesis of Sherlock Holmes. Joe hires a baby nurse who takes over his life. Guest starring: Christopher Cazenove, Edie McClurg, Judith Hoag, Warren Sweeney, Kenneth Danziger and Caroline Lagerfelt
| 36 | 5 | "Blackout" | Chuck Bowman | Reed Steiner & Jed Seidel | October 17, 1997 | 302 | 11.16 |
Nash, on the verge of closing a case while undercover, narrowly escapes getting killed in an explosion, losing a week's worth of memory as a result. With Joe's help, he has to retrace his steps, resolve the case, and deal with the various personal snafus resulting from his memory loss. Michelle Chan (played by Kelly Hu) joins the SIU. Guest starring: Kari Wuhrer, Anthony Guidera, Michael Wyle, Suzanne Krull, Terry Holbrook and Kelly Hu as Michelle Chan
| 37 | 6 | "Ripcord" | Christopher Misiano | Terri Treas & Michael Zand | October 24, 1997 | 303 | 11.71 |
Cassidy finds herself in the middle of an SIU case when she becomes the victim of a high-climbing jewel thief and Nash begins to close in on the suspect: her new boyfriend. Stacy becomes concerned that Nick is being turned into a lab rat at the university where he has volunteered for a research study Guest starring: Angela Dohrmann, Ladd York, Dylan Bruno and Daniel Rosen
| 38 | 7 | "Sniper" | Dennie Gordon | Shawn Ryan | October 31, 1997 | 304 | 12.09 |
A sniper terrorizes San Francisco on Halloween as a city-wide Blue Flu forces our SIU detectives to assume beat cop responsibilities. In the process, Michelle may have killed an innocent person. Joe tracks down hard to find Halloween costume for Lucia. Guest starring: Andrew Divoff, Patrick Fischler, Tava Smiley and Kelly Hu as Michelle Chan Special guest stars: Elvira as Frankie and Rex Linn
| 39 | 8 | "Revelations" | Deran Sarafian | Carlton Cuse & John Wirth | November 7, 1997 | 305 | 12.88 |
When a reporter is murdered while covering the new "French Connection", Nash comes face-to-face with a startling revelation – his brother, a Vietnam MIA, thought dead for the last 24 years, may be alive and in San Francisco. Meanwhile, Lisa's sister, Lynette, arrives to house-sit at Lisa's indefinitely. Guest starring: Suki Kaiser, Michael Massee, Kieu Chinh as Madame Nu and Kelly Hu as Michelle Chan Special guest star: Tracey Walter as Angel and Jan Michael Vincent as Bobby Chase
| 40 | 9 | "Most Wanted" | Perry Lang | Jed Seidel | November 14, 1997 | 306 | 11.96 |
A fugitive is released from prison by mistake and seeks revenge on Michelle. Nash teams with Michelle to capture him. Meanwhile, Nash refuses to partner with Joe on an off duty case to protect a sportscaster being blackmailed, so Joe chooses Evan. Guest starring: Tim de Zarn, K.K. Dodds, Roberta Gonzales, Kristy Connelly, Lisa McCullough and Robert Joseph
| 41 | 10 | "Bombshell" | Rick Wallace | Andrew Dettmann & Daniel Truly | November 21, 1997 | 307 | 13.84 |
Sultry criminal and Nash's ex-girlfriend Tamara VanZant (Donna Scott) resurfaces, this time as a player in a plot to sell stolen plutonium. Joe plans to make a mint by marketing a secret-recipe salsa that's been in his family for generations. Guest starring: Donna W. Scott as Tamara VanZant, Wanda De Jesus and Robert Rodriguez as Joe's commercial director
| 42 | 11 | "Found Money" | Julian Chojnacki | Shawn Ryan | December 5, 1997 | 308 | 11.89 |
Rick Bettina returns as the head of the S.I.U. when Joe is accused of stealing 3 million dollars from a suspect. Harvey has a torrid affair with a woman he once arrested. Guest starring: Leslie Hardy, Sharisse Baker-Bernard, Michael Bowen, Anthony Guzman and Daniel Roebuck as Rick Bettina Special guest star: Richard Brooks as Max Moore
| 43 | 12 | "Dirty Tricks" | John T. Kretchmer | Andrew Dettmann & Daniel Truly | December 19, 1997 | 310 | 11.33 |
Nash and Joe risk causing an international incident after British consulate workers fake the death of a convicted killer in order to use him for their own nefarious purposes. Joe resorts to extreme measures in order to get Lucia accepted into an ultra-elite school. Guest starring: Neil Dickson, Cliff Emmich, Lillian Lehman and Caroline Lagerfelt
| 44 | 13 | "Crossfire" | Robert Mandel | Story : Ron Russell; Teleplay : Reed Steiner & Jed Seidel | January 9, 1998 | 311 | 13.26 |
A million dollar bounty on Nash's head triggers an onslaught of attacks by a series of ultimate fighters. Michelle meets "Mr. Right" while on a stakeout trying to trackdown an Internet rapist. Nash is convinced Cassidy's new boyfriend is gay. Guest starring: Mark Rolston, Kathe Mazur, Peter Kenney, Steven Vincent Leigh, Ken Shamrock and Dan Severn
| 45 | 14 | "Live Shot" | Julian Chojnacki | Carlton Cuse & John Wirth | January 16, 1998 | 312 | 11.73 |
While drinking with a young biker couple, Nash's drink is spiked with LSD at the same time Geraldo Rivera comes to interview him and Joe. Guest starring: Daniel Rosen, Meadow Sisto, Emma Caulfield Ford and Willie Brown Special guest star: Geraldo Rivera
| 46 | 15 | "Downtime" | Melanie Mayron | Carlton Cuse & John Wirth | January 30, 1998 | 313 | 11.10 |
Nash is forced to take 10 months and 13 days off under the command of Rick Bettina, who uses his new position to throw the SIU office into chaos. Guest starring: Russell Means, Suki Kaiser, Christian Meoli as Boz Bishop and Daniel Roebuck as Rick Bettina Special guest star: Eileen Brennan as Loretta Bettina
| 47 | 16 | "Skin Deep" | Jim Charleston | Reed Steiner | February 27, 1998 | 309 | 10.94 |
Nash and Joe team up with a tough-talking NYPD Special Crimes Detective (Penny Marshall) in order to track down a famous fashion model's deadly stalker. Meanwhile, Harvey helps Evan track down his lost badge before Nash finds out. A shopping trip doesn't turn out the way Nick and Lynette had planned. Guest starring: Suki Kaiser, John Pyper-Ferguson and Stephanie Romanov Special guest star: Penny Marshall as NYPD Det. Iris Heller
| 48 | 17 | "Patriots" | Deran Sarafian | Shawn Ryan | March 6, 1998 | 314 | 10.65 |
Nash gets involved with Irish terrorists, as well as his ex-wife Kelly (played by Special guest star Serena Scott Thomas). Meanwhile, Joe looks after a party-minded Arabian prince awaiting a heart transplant. Guest starring: Don Novello, Markus Flanagan, Sean Lawlor and John Apicella Special guest star: Serena Scott Thomas as Kelly Weld
| 49 | 18 | "Cuda Grace" | Scott Brazil | Reed Steiner & Jed Seidel | April 3, 1998 | 317 | 10.39 |
Nash and Joe investigate several brutal drug-related gangland murders and follow a complicated trail of clues to a surprising suspect – Bruce Sutcliffe, a multi-millionaire from a well-respected San Francisco family. When Nash discovers that Sutcliffe has been a major drug kingpin for years, he risks his job and his life to expose the magnate's secret life. Meanwhile, Evan and Bettina go undercover in a transgender beauty pageant to trap a blackmailing murderess who pretends to be a man impersonating a woman. Guest starring: RuPaul, James R. Black, Leslie Hardy, Lawrence Adisa, Maximilliana, Scott Capurro and Daniel Roebuck as Rick Bettina
| 50 | 19 | "Lady Killer" | Jesús Salvador Treviño | Andrew Dettmann & Daniel Truly | April 10, 1998 | 315 | 11.30 |
Bettina is accused of killing a high-class call girl. Only Nash can help Rick find out who framed him for murder. Meanwhile, a man masquerading as Joe has become a major romantic figure in town (with Joe's credit cards), much to Inger's chagrin. Guest starring: Russell Means, Charles Lucia, Andi Carnick, Julien Cesario, Billy Reick, Caroline Lagerfelt and Daniel Roebuck
| 51 | 20 | "Danger Zone" | Julian Chojnacki | Story : Kim Costello; Story & teleplay : Carlton Cuse & John Wirth | April 17, 1998 | 316 | 11.27 |
Nash and Joe are on the trail of a ruthless gang of thieves threatening to release the lethal nerve gas over downtown San Francisco unless the area is evacuated. Once the area is cleared of people, the criminals plan to move in and rob the banks in the area. Racing against time to capture the criminal mastermind behind this scheme, Nash is surprised to discover that the gang leader is Pamela Smith, a beautiful, brilliant chemist who created the deadly gas. Meanwhile, a mysterious woman appears who claims to be Joe's daughter from a college fertility experiment in which he participated years earlier. Guest starring: Stacy Haiduk, Patrick Fischler, Diana Uribe, Dwayne Barnes, Mark Drexler, Anjul Nigam and Caroline Lagerfelt
| 52 | 21 | "Special Delivery" | Greg Beeman | Andrew Dettmann & Daniel Truly | May 1, 1998 | 318 | 10.59 |
Nash must protect Lynette from ruthless Hong Kong mobsters when she unknowingly becomes involved in an Asian forgery ring. When Lynette's old flame, Brian, mails her a flawless forgery plate for $100 bills, Nash must protect her from the brutal Hong Kong gangsters from whom the plate was stolen. When Brian unexpectedly appears at Lynette's door, their attraction is re-ignited, but he soon becomes the chief suspect in Nash's investigation into the forgery ring, run by an Asian crime syndicate. Meanwhile, Joe's visiting father (Ismael Carlo), a sheriff from New Mexico, drives Joe crazy with his meddling until he uses his own brand of Wild West sleuthing to expose a murderer in Joe's apartment building. Guest starring: Stephen Lee, Suki Kaiser, Ismael 'East' Carlo, William deVry, Leo Lee and Caroline Lagerfelt
| 53 | 22 | "Touchdown" | Jim Charleston | Reed Steiner & Jed Seidel | May 15, 1998 | 319 | 9.02 |
When Nash and Joe investigate the mysterious disappearance of several armored cars and their drivers, they uncover a high-tech, covert crime operation run by ex-Navy Seals. When the robbers kidnap Evan, Nash must lure them out of hiding by staging an armored car delivery. Meanwhile, an off-duty case finds Nash and Joe searching for a star football player's dream girl, whom he spotted in a stadium filled with 65,000 fans but doesn't know. Also, the relationship between Evan and Cassidy intensifies as they struggle to keep their affair a secret from Nash. Guest starring: Angela Dohrmann, Suki Kaiser, Yvonna Kopacz Wright, Christian Meoli as Boz Bishop, Brian Turk, Scott Eberlein and Eddie George as Leon Washington
| 54 | 23 | "Sacraments" | Deran Sarafian | Carlton Cuse & John Wirth | May 15, 1998 | 320 | 11.99 |
Harvey's shot by death-metal rockers; Stacy and Nash meet Nick's long-lost love; Joe finds Evan and Cassidy in a compromising situation. Guest starring: Anne Francis, Angela Dohrmann, Suki Kaiser, Jill Lover, Rainbow Borden, Skip O'Brien and Clay Wilcox

=== Season 4 (1998–99) ===
| No. overall | No. in season | Title | Directed by | Written by | Original release date | Prod. code | Viewers (millions) |
|---|---|---|---|---|---|---|---|
| 55 | 1 | "High Fall" | Jim Charleston | Carlton Cuse & John Wirth | September 25, 1998 | 401 | 11.74 |
Nash discovers that some financial hanky-panky involving an old flame has burned up his life savings. Guest starring: Donna W. Scott as Tamara Van Zant, Angela Dohrmann, Patrick Fischler, John H. Brennan, Jay Harik, with Kelly Hu as Michelle Chan, and Caroline Lagerfelt
| 56 | 2 | "Imposters" | David Carson | Reed Steiner & Jed Seidel | October 2, 1998 | 402 | 13.03 |
Nash and Joe are the targets of a bail bondsman, who bails out small time thugs and uses them as assassins. Nash and Joe also open up a new detective agency; Bridges & Dominguez – – their first case is finding the stolen wig of a Cher impersonator. Harvey and Evan's friendship is tested when Evan sells Harvey a faulty washing machine. Guest starring: Ivelka Reyes, Lissa Negrin, Patrick Fischler, Kevin Fry, Stefanos Miltsakikis, Jon Huertas, Brian Strauss, Sammy Hagar and Kelly Hu as Michelle Chan
| 57 | 3 | "Hot Prowler" | Julian Chojnacki | Reed Steiner & Jed Seidel | October 9, 1998 | 403 | 12.04 |
Nash and Joe track a prowler who is terrorizing San Francisco and broadcasting his crimes on the internet. Meanwhile, after Nick springs for dinner at a Hawaiian restaurant, Joe's son J.J. chips his tooth on a piece of poi, prompting Joe and Nick to conspire to get a settlement from the restaurant. Guest starring: Stephen Berra, Jana Marie Hupp, Kirk Fox, Armando Ortega and Kelly Hu as Michelle Chan
| 58 | 4 | "Overdrive" | Jim Charleston | Shawn Ryan | October 16, 1998 | 404 | 11.03 |
An innocent man is scheduled for an execution. Nash, working the entire case from the 'Cuda, must bring the true killer to justice before the midnight deadline. Lucia's bullying of a schoolmate forces Joe and Inger to attend conflict resolution therapy, which only leads to more conflict. Guest starring: Angela Dohrmann, Marc McClure, Tom Virtue, Zack Ward, Christian Leffler, Denny Dillon, with Michael Earl Reid, and Caroline Lagerfelt
| 59 | 5 | "Apocalypse Nash" | Greg Beeman | Carlton Cuse & John Wirth | October 23, 1998 | 405 | 12.09 |
Nash and Joe are arrested for the murder of three SFPD Investigators. Told in a non-linear style, we slowly unravel a conspiracy trying to frame Nash and Joe. Guest starring: Meagen Fay, Carlton Wilborn, Pat Skipper, Michael Wiseman, with Kimberly Quinn and Daniel Roebuck as Rick Bettina Special guest star: Yasmine Bleeth who is introduced as Inspector Caitlin Cross.
| 60 | 6 | "The Tourist" | Mikael Salomon | Lynne E. Litt | October 30, 1998 | 406 | 12.83 |
Nash and Joe are on the trail of a renowned assassin who has come to San Francisco to kill FBI special agent David Katz. Lisa Bridges returns from Paris and announces she's engaged to marry a famous French chef named Henri, but there's a problem; Nash and Lisa's divorce was never finalized. The new S.I.U. headquarters is introduced. Guest starring: Christopher Rich, Nicholas Walker, Patty Maloney, Taylor Negron, Jim Parish, and Annette O'Toole as Lisa Bridges
| 61 | 7 | "Swingers" | Jim Charleston | Reed Steiner & Jed Seidel | November 6, 1998 | 407 | 12.48 |
Nash and Caitlin go undercover as swingers to bust a male-female team who prey on wealthy swinging couples. Joe and Boz help Nick recover the corpse of an old friend to whom Nick made a war-time promise. Guest starring: Christian Meoli as Boz Bishop, Kari Whitman, Will Stewart, Paul Popowich, Jim Abele Special guest star: Yasmine Bleeth
| 62 | 8 | "Warplay" | David Jackson | Glen Mazzara | November 13, 1998 | 408 | 12.01 |
Nash becomes the objective of mercenaries controlled by a Singapore billionaire and his American counterpart, locked in battle to capture each other's most prized possessions. Bettina wants Joe and Evan to investigate his fiancee's alleged affair. Guest starring: Marci Brickhouse, Zion, and Daniel Roebuck as Rick Bettina
| 63 | 9 | "Firestorm" | Robert Mandel | Shawn Ryan | November 20, 1998 | 409 | 13.18 |
Nash pursues a deadly arsonist who torches a church and the only witness is Angel (Tracey Walter). Caitlin investigates Evan on a police brutality charge, probing into his past. Nash's friends and family plan a surprise birthday for him. Guest starring: Sean Whalen, Peter Jason, Buckley Sampson Special guest stars: Tracey Walter as Angel, and Daniel Roebuck as Rick Bettina
| 64 | 10 | "Hardball" | Jim Charleston | Story : Gary Perconte; Teleplay : John Wirth | December 4, 1998 | 410 | 11.80 |
Nash and Joe have to babysit Mickey Tripp (Paul Gleason), a motormouth shockjock, after a body armor-wearing assassin tries to kill him. Their search for the assassin is compounded by the fact that Nick has hired them on an off-duty case to find his softball team's star pitcher – a Salvadoran defector named Chus (Jose Canseco), who's on the run from the INS. Caitlin babysits her roommate's kids. Guest starring: Paul Gleason as Mickey Tripp, Lisa Darr, Gina La Piana, Peter Jason, Jessica Hopper, and Jose Canseco as Chus Ortez Special guest stars: Karl Malone as INS Agent Andre Cobb
| 65 | 11 | "Mystery Dance" | Perry Lang | Carlton Cuse & John Wirth | December 18, 1998 | 411 | 12.78 |
Nash finds himself defending Caitlin when she's the main suspect for a murdered CIA agent connected to her mysterious past. Joe begins working out with the trainer from hell. Cassidy and Nick enter a tango dance contest. Guest starring: Peter Onorati, Christian Boeving, Charlene Blaine, Lisa Darr, Caroline Lagerfelt, and Joe Spano as FBI Agent Langdon
| 66 | 12 | "Shoot the Moon" | Robert Mandel | Jed Seidel & Reed Steiner | January 8, 1999 | 412 | 13.44 |
Nash is accidentally shot in the butt by Caitlin, leaving Rick Bettina in charge. Rick is duped by phony FBI agents attempting to swindle half a million in sting money. Cassidy is stalked by a violent classmate. Guest starring: Eric Balfour, Randy J. Goodwin, Wayne Duvall, Alie Ward as Miranda, and Daniel Roebuck as Rick Bettina
| 67 | 13 | "Gimme Shelter" | Pat Duffy | Shawn Ryan & Glen Mazzara | January 15, 1999 | 413 | 14.14 |
Harvey discovers his counterculture pal is involved in a murder plot to benefit from a proposed new stadium site. Joe clears his "daughter" accused of stealing jewelry at her department store job. Nash helps Caitlin get into an exclusive VIP party for an artist. Guest starring: Diana Uribe, John Walcutt, Jay Harrington, Mark Lindsay Chapman, Andrea C. Robinson, and Orlando Brown
| 68 | 14 | "Superstition" | Jim Charleston | Reed Steiner & Jed Seidel | February 12, 1999 | 414 | 12.24 |
Nash and company stop a vampire cult from kidnapping a singer for her special blood. Joe goes shopping for a car for wife Inger at the police auction, while Caitlin moves out of the SIU. Guest starring: Michael Des Barres, Christian Meoli, Jenny McShane, Josie Davis, Matt O'Toole, Peter Jason
| 69 | 15 | "Resurrection" | Julian Chojnacki | Carlton Cuse & John Wirth | February 19, 1999 | 415 | 11.29 |
Harvey tracks down two teenage boys who are deadly snipers. Joe has a rat problem in Nash's house, causing a dispute between landlord and tenant. Evan proposes marriage to Cassidy who is then involved in a deadly auto accident. Guest starring: Dee Wallace, Dawnn Lewis, Leon Russom, Boti Ann Bliss, with Armando Ortega, and Caroline Lagerfelt
| 70 | 16 | "Pump Action" | Jim Charleston | Story : Hunter S. Thompson; Story & teleplay : Reed Steiner & Jed Seidel | February 26, 1999 | 416 | 14.80 |
Nash and company, along with marginal cop Jake Cage (Stone Cold Steve Austin), track down pushers of a deadly steroid which makes body builders go hyper-aggressive. Cassidy is haunted by the death of her friend from the auto accident. Guest starring: Bob Koherr, Richard Redlin, Christine Lydon, Pete Koch, Boti Ann Bliss Special guest star: WWE Hall of Fame Stone Cold Steve Austin as Jake Cage
| 71 | 17 | "Hide and Seek" | Colin Bucksey | Carlton Cuse & John Wirth | March 5, 1999 | 417 | 12.51 |
Nash and the SIU secretly investigate a plot involving the missing married Governor of California who has fallen in love with a former prostitute. Joe gets stuck with a painting while bidding for someone else at his daughter's pre-school charity auction. Guest starring: Raphael Sbarge, Michael Tomlinson, Ely Pouget, Jenny Cooper, John Bennett Perry, with Keith Harvey, and Caroline Lagerfelt
| 72 | 18 | "Boomtown" | Julian Chojnacki | Glen Mazzara & Shawn Ryan | March 26, 1999 | 418 | 12.23 |
A sleepless Nash and company stop a disgruntled bomber from further retaliation against his software employer. Cassidy performs topless in a play, but an unknowing Nash falls asleep. Guest starring: Brad Greenquist, Barbara Tyson, James Morrison, Keith Bogart, Kelly Parks, Rebecca Parks, Wendy Parks
| 73 | 19 | "Angel of Mercy" | Jim Charleston | John Wirth | April 2, 1999 | 419 | 11.50 |
The Bayside Killer resurfaces after a four-year absence, while Nash finally unravels Angel's identity. Harvey's ex-wife Bonnie stops by for a visit. Joe and Caitlin coach rival girls' soccer teams, with Caitlin's new boyfriend as her assistant coach. Guest starring: Mark Dobies, Julianne Christie, Edward Albert, Dana Gladstone, Sean Moran Special guest star: Tracey Walter as Angel
| 74 | 20 | "Power Play" | Patrick Norris | Carlton Cuse & Rob Kenneally | April 16, 1999 | 420 | 13.00 |
Nash and company foil a Russian mobster's kidnap plan to fix a hockey game. Inger wants another baby; Evan blows a hole in the roof of the Watch Commander's car. Guest starring: Stephen Lee as Tony B, William Smith, Michael Wyle, Athena Massey, Pasha D. Lychnikoff
| 75 | 21 | "Vendetta" | Jim Charleston | Reed Steiner & Jed Seidel | April 23, 1999 | 421 | 12.03 |
An ex-cop Caitlin indicted gets out of prison and terrorizes her. Harvey has an affair with a woman he's met undercover. Joe has urgent sex with ovulating Inger. Guest starring: Laura Cayouette, Julie Araskog, Rocco Vienhage, Caroline Lagerfelt and Billy Drago as Lou Grissom
| 76 | 22 | "Crash and Burn" | Julian Chojnacki | Story : Reed Steiner & Jed Seidel; Teleplay : Kimberlee Crawford | April 30, 1999 | 422 | 11.37 |
Nash and company discover a gang of female bank robbers who plan to break their husbands out of jail. Nick schemes to move into a formerly all-women retirement home. Caitlin readies her negative report on the SIU, much to Nash's consternation. Guest starring: Taylor Young, Viveka Davis, Julia Nickson, Kyle T. Heffner, Jo Dee Messina
| 77 | 23 | "Frisco Blues" | Jim Charleston | Reed Steiner & Jed Seidel | May 7, 1999 | 423 | 13.42 |
The SIU is disbanded by MCD: Nash and Joe are assigned to Park Detail, Harvey to Homicide, Evan to Traffic, and Caitlin to Vice. Still, Nash manages to solve a murder involving the Head of MCD's daughter and a drug dealer. Evan and Cassidy announce a wedding date; best man Harvey throws a bachelor party, but finds out the stripper is Anna. Nash tells Caitlin he loves her, but she accepts a job in Boston. Guest starring: Stephanie Niznik, Leslie Hardy, Michael Hagerty, with Amanda Foreman, and Cliff De Young
| 78 | 24 | "Goodbye Kiss" | Paul Abascal | Carlton Cuse & John Wirth | May 14, 1999 | 424 | 12.45 |
Nash and company, along with Jake Cage, catch three escaped convicts to save the SIU. Harvey has fathered a child with Anna; Evan cheats on Cassidy; Nash and Caitlin finally consummate their relationship. Guest starring: Michael Hagerty, with Amanda Foreman, and Cliff De Young Special guest star: WWE Hall of Fame Stone Cold Steve Austin as Jake Cage

=== Season 5 (1999–2000) ===
| No. overall | No. in season | Title | Directed by | Written by | Original release date | Prod. code | Viewers (millions) |
|---|---|---|---|---|---|---|---|
| 79 | 1 | "Truth and Consequences" | Jim Charleston | Carlton Cuse & John Wirth | September 24, 1999 | 501 | 12.56 |
When a controversial Latina actress is shot and killed, suspicion turns first to her former lover, then to a crazed stalker. Evan comes back to work after surgery, but Cassidy wants nothing to do with him. Caitlin moves in with Nash, and causes strife between her and Nick. Guest starring: Andrea Roth, Ken Marino, Morgan Weisser, Jon Polito, Anna Hess and Caroline Lagerfelt
| 80 | 2 | "Trade Off" | Paul Abascal | Reed Steiner & Jed Seidel | October 1, 1999 | 502 | 13.73 |
Nash and company foil a failing restaurateur's kidnap plan to ransom his nanny's child. Nick has sex with Bridget, Caitlin's inept maid. Inger returns for a visit, but leaves for Sweden again. Cassidy has a friend attempt suicide because he can't get a date with her. Guest starring: Edie McClurg, Katy Boyer, Caroline Lagerfelt and Corbin Bernsen
| 81 | 3 | "Smash and Grab" | Robert Mandel | Shawn Ryan & Glen Mazzara | October 8, 1999 | 503 | 13.77 |
Nash and company foil a jewelry heist ring posing as firemen. Nash hits a pedestrian and gets sued. But Caitlin has misplaced Nash's auto insurance bill, and he blames Caitlin. Guest starring: Dean Norris, Max Perlich, Clare Wren, Armando Ortega
| 82 | 4 | "Girl Trouble" | Jim Charleston | Carlton Cuse & John Wirth | October 15, 1999 | 504 | 12.60 |
Cassidy finds an apartment, only to be mistaken for the previous renter who has stolen money from drug dealers. Lonely Joe carries on an online romance, but the other "woman" turns out to be Pepe. Evan bottoms out in his broken relationship with Cassidy Guest starring: Patrick Fischler, Tim Ransom, James Eckhouse, Roger Yuan
| 83 | 5 | "High Society" | Scott Brazil | Reed Steiner & Jed Seidel | October 22, 1999 | 505 | 13.43 |
Jake Cage and Caitlin go undercover to capture an international fugitive returning home for the wedding of his daughter. Nash and Joe steal a violin for corporate clients, only to have the violin stolen again by one of Joe's detective students. Evan gets involved with a street prostitute. Guest starring: Edward Edwards, François Chau, Christian Meoli as Boz Bishop Special guest star: WWE Hall of Fame Stone Cold Steve Austin as Jake Cage
| 84 | 6 | "Curveball" | Paul Abascal | Glen Mazzara & Shawn Ryan | November 5, 1999 | 506 | 11.84 |
An embezzler with a twin, along with bumbling Rick Bettina, confound the efforts of Nash and the SIU to recover stolen city funds. Caitlin tosses Nash's baseball out the window after they miss their flight to Jamaica. Guest starring: Leslie Hardy, J.C. Wendel, Nadine Stenovitch and Daniel Roebuck as Rick Bettina Special guest star: Giancarlo Esposito
| 85 | 7 | "Split Decision" | Pat Duffy | Reed Steiner & Michael Norell | November 12, 1999 | 507 | 12.09 |
A psychologist establishes an insanity defense for her patient while they plan bank robberies. Nick wants to become financially independent by marrying a rich widow. Evan shows up for work drunk, forcing Harvey to confront Evan's substance abuse problem. Guest starring: Bruce Ramsay, Grace Phillips, Barbara Stuart, Victor Rivers
| 86 | 8 | "Get Bananas" | Scott Brazil | Carlton Cuse & John Wirth | November 19, 1999 | 508 | 12.25 |
Evan puts himself under suspicion after he takes $40,000 of drug money during a bust; Nash and the SIU take down a drug dealer. Nash and Joe guard a chimpanzee, while Jake Cage goes undercover as an animal extremist. Guest starring: Harry Van Gorkum, Susan Gibney, Sticky Fingaz, Robin Atkin Downes, Antwon Tanner Special guest star: WWE Hall of Fame Stone Cold Steve Austin as Jake Cage
| 87 | 9 | "Crosstalk" | Steve De Jarnatt | Alan Ormsby | November 26, 1999 | 509 | 12.22 |
Nash and the SIU discover the Cell Phone Killer's intentions are to kill his doctor. Lonely Joe keeps having erotic dreams about Caitlin. Evan gets fired from his bartender job. Guest starring: Dan Castellaneta, Willie Garson, Yeardley Smith, Scott Jaeck, Chris Marquette
| 88 | 10 | "Kill Switch" | Lewis Teague | Shawn Ryan | December 10, 1999 | 510 | 10.99 |
A juror becomes a vigilante avenging murder victims. Caitlin and Joe go in on a donut business venture. Evan is arrested and calls Cassidy; Cassidy finds a new boyfriend. Guest starring: David Purdham, Trevor St. John, Keone Young and Kelly Rutherford
| 89 | 11 | "Rip Off" | Jim Charleston | Jed Seidel & Reed Steiner | December 17, 1999 | 511 | 11.86 |
A small time getaway driver sets up two robbery gangs to rob each other, while he walks away with the loot and complete immunity. Evan is brought in for another chance in Joe's off-duty case concerning a kidnapped son who has had a gender change. The 'Cuda hood is graffitied, and Nash puts Boz Bishop on the case. Guest starring: Catherine Dent, J. August Richards, Christian Meoli as Boz Bishop and Pauly Shore as Mickey Gamble
| 90 | 12 | "Skin Trade" | Greg Beeman | Glen Mazzara | January 7, 2000 | 512 | 11.57 |
Lowlife Frankie Dwyer returns, this time importing Vietnamese women as sex slaves, as Caitlin goes undercover as the seller. Nash has a tooth ache and refers to Caitlin by his first wife's name. Joe is aggressively pursued by bodybuilder Spike; Evan bumps into Cassidy in his job as a parking lot attendant. Guest starring: Tim Ransom, Trevor St. John, Christine Lydon, Dara Tomanovich, Alexandra Hedison and Robert Carradine
| 91 | 13 | "Liar's Poker" | Jim Charleston | Reed Steiner & Michael Norell | January 28, 2000 | 513 | 12.64 |
Nash goes undercover as a hitman for a drug cartel. Nick's poker buddies plan a bank heist; Inger returns from Sweden with her mother; Evan gets his engagement ring back from Cassidy. Guest starring: Alimi Ballard, Ivana Miličević, Carl Gordon, George Gerdes and Caroline Lagerfelt as Inger Dominguez
| 92 | 14 | "El Diablo" | Lewis Teague | Carlton Cuse & John Wirth | February 11, 2000 | 514 | 12.21 |
A married woman is murdered by her lover and his wife. Evan is beaten up trying to free his girlfriend/hooker from the clutches of a pimp. Joe takes Evan in, but Evan attempts suicide. Boz Bishop asks for a promotion at the detective agency. Guest starring: Dan Gauthier, Geoffrey Nauffts, Merritt Hicks, J.R. Yenque, with Caroline Lagerfelt, Christian Meoli as Boz Bishop and Ron Jeremy
| 93 | 15 | "Hit and Run" | David Jackson | Shawn Ryan | February 18, 2000 | 515 | 10.88 |
Frankie Dwyer returns again, putting out a contract on Nash's life while smuggling heroin inside of tofu containers. Nash and Caitlin's relationship is strained; Inger sets up Nick with her mother Ulla; Evan is born again in a baptism. Guest starring: Tim Ransom, Deborah Cox as Vanessa Swan, Kel Mitchell as Stephan Clark, Stefanos Miltsakikis, Jordan Marder and Caroline Lagerfelt
| 94 | 16 | "Cop Out" | Jim Charleston | John Wirth & Jed Seidel | February 25, 2000 | 516 | 11.22 |
Wearing his brother's uniform as a motorcycle cop and impersonating a police officer, a deranged man imagines and talks to his dead brother. Nash adjusts to his break-up with Caitlin; Nick fails his driving test; Cassidy asks Evan for help to move back into a Berkeley apartment. Guest starring: Troy Ruptash, John Thaddeus, Lillian Adams
| 95 | 17 | "Line of Sight" | Greg Yaitanes | Alan Ormsby | March 10, 2000 | 517 | 11.05 |
A gang war erupts – Nash and the SIU puts a drug gangster and his crew out of business. Cassidy comes on to Evan as their lovemaking is shown on a live camera web site. Joe and Nick get involved in a tax scam with Nick's racehorse – Mr. Woody, as the horse is once again fit to race. Guest starring: Courtney Peldon, Mailon Rivera, Colleen McDermott, John Marshall Jones, Jill Ritchie, Matt Gottlieb
| 96 | 18 | "Heist" | Steve De Jarnatt | Jed Seidel & Reed Steiner | March 31, 2000 | 518 | 9.55 |
Nash goes undercover to stop a high-end heist artist. Joe helps a restaurant critic who receives death threats; Evan is back in the SIU; Caitlin takes an administrative job within the department; and Harvey helps out a troubled 12-year-old boy. Guest starring: Ivana Miličević, Richard Cox, Robert Joy, Cody Kasch
| 97 | 19 | "Hard Cell" | Jim Charleston | Deborah Amelon | April 7, 2000 | 519 | 11.17 |
A gang of female prisoners escape in search of five million dollars in bearer bonds, while Nash helps the woman framed for the theft of the bonds. Joe has trouble with a delivery boy, while Cassidy considers a career with the CIA. Guest starring: Kate McNeil, Josie DiVincenzo, David Faustino as Simon, Jay Karnes, Georgia Emelin
| 98 | 20 | "Missing Key" | Robert Mandel | Carlton Cuse & John Wirth | April 28, 2000 | 520 | 10.57 |
A nurse who assists a plastic surgeon for the mob is murdered because she stole the before and after photos of altered mobsters. She passes a key to the hidden files to Joe, and Joe becomes a target of mobster Louis Fallon. Nick appears with Cassidy in her play but suffers a bout of Alzheimer's. Harvey meets a new girl, but she is a former lesbian. Guest starring: Michael Trucco, Jeannetta Arnette, Sydney Walsh, Laura Johnson, George Hamilton
| 99 | 21 | "Jackpot: Part 1" | Greg Yaitanes | Jed Seidel & Reed Steiner | May 5, 2000 | 521 | 10.60 |
The Chief of Police is assassinated and a money laundering operation is set up between San Francisco and Las Vegas. A rogue DEA agent and the assassin are after half a billion dollars in cash, with Nash and Joe following them to Las Vegas. Nash locates Angel's lost wings; and Nash gets Nick a cell phone. Guest starring: Silas Weir Mitchell, Tzi Ma, Athena Massey, Robert LaSardo Special guest stars: Theresa Russell, Tracey Walter as Angel, with Stephen Lee as Tony B and WWE Hall of Fame Stone Cold Steve Austin as Jake Cage
| 100 | 22 | "Jackpot: Part 2" | Jim Charleston | Carlton Cuse & John Wirth | May 19, 2000 | 522 | 10.63 |
After following the turncoat DEA agent to Las Vegas, Nash goes undercover as "Tommy Malone" to flush out Jimmy Z. Nash summons Evan and Harvey to come to Vegas to help him catch Jimmy Z's henchman, McNair, who escaped custody. Cassidy follows, and proposes to Evan. He accepts, but is, while undercover, killed while pursuing McNair. After capturing Jimmy Z and his boss, and avenging Evan by killing McNair, Nash goes to bring the bad news to Cassidy. Caitlin tells Nash her decision to leave the SIU and move to Washington D.C to help her sister with her new baby. Guest starring: Silas Weir Mitchell, Tzi Ma, Patrick Fischler, Nikita Ager Special guest stars: Theresa Russell, Stephen Lee as Tony B and WWE Hall of Fame Stone Cold Steve Austin as Jake Cage Note: Final appearances of Jaime P. Gomez and Yasmine Bleeth in the series.

=== Season 6 (2000–01) ===
| No. overall | No. in season | Title | Directed by | Written by | Original release date | Prod. code | Viewers (millions) |
|---|---|---|---|---|---|---|---|
| 101 | 1 | "Rock and a Hard Place" | Jim Charleston | Reed Steiner & Damon Lindelof | October 6, 2000 | 601 | 14.19 |
An old nemesis of Nash's breaks out of prison. Joe finds a new house through Ulla, makes an incredible deal on it, but it turns out to be a disaster. Harvey's new partner, Antwon Babcock, joins the SIU. Guest starring: Caroline Lagerfelt
| 102 | 2 | "Jump Start" | David Jackson | Carlton Cuse & John Wirth | October 13, 2000 | 602 | 13.59 |
Nash clashes with his new rival, Deputy Chief Max Pettit, who has assigned Cassidy to a dangerous undercover gig involving synthetic diamond smugglers and a deadly assassin working for the South African diamond cartel. Joe tries to back out of the house purchase; Cassidy and her new partner Rachel McCabe join the S.I.U. Guest starring: Caroline Lagerfelt, David Faustino, Armando Ortega, Corey Curtis
| 103 | 3 | "Lap Dance" | Pat Duffy | Thom Bray | October 20, 2000 | 603 | 11.12 |
Nash pursues an old flame who is involved with an arms dealer; Joe takes a private detective case to discover if a symphony conductor is having an affair; Cassidy struggles to let go of Evan's memory when she is asked out on a date. Guest starring: Donna Scott as Tamara Van Zant, and Stephen Lee as Tony B
| 104 | 4 | "Land Pirates" | Jim Charleston | Carlton Cuse & John Wirth | October 27, 2000 | 604 | 11.84 |
Nash and Joe are on the trail of a high-profile robbery ring that targets San Francisco socialites. Nash runs into Angel when Belinda Cruz hires him to prove her sister's pregnancy (she's a nun) is not a virgin birth. Joe enlists Nick to build a speed bump in front of his house. Guest starring: Roselyn Sanchez as Belinda Cruz, and Tracey Walter as Angel
| 105 | 5 | "ManHunt" | Don Kurt | Larry Barber & Paul Barber | November 3, 2000 | 605 | 11.26 |
A drug gang knocks over a DEA evidence warehouse and proves elusive for the members of the team; Antwon has a seizure while chasing down the leader of the gang. Guest starring: Brian Bosworth as Bobby Usher
| 106 | 6 | "Double Trouble" | Bradford May | Reed Steiner & Kim Beyer-Johnson | November 10, 2000 | 606 | 12.16 |
Nash and Joe discover that someone is using their detective agency's name to stir up business for themselves, and that one of the impostor's clients is out to kill Nash; a college student is believed to have drunk himself to death, but Cassidy suspects he was actually murdered; Hank intervenes when his neighbors get too rowdy. Guest starring: Alie Ward as Miranda, and Survivor: Borneo stars Dirk Been, Joel Klug, Gervase Peterson, Sean Kenniff, and Jenna Lewis
| 107 | 7 | "End Game" | Jim Charleston | Reed Steiner & Damon Lindelof | November 17, 2000 | 607 | 11.44 |
Nash tries to stop a deadly game in which participants shoot and kill each other until only one is left alive; a wealthy family's gardener is murdered and Nash starts to fall for a beautiful new investigator working the case. Guest starring: Christian J. Meoli as Boz Bishop Special guest stars: Richard Libertini, Kenneth Mars
| 108 | 8 | "Blow Out" | Scott Brazil | Carlton Cuse & John Wirth | November 24, 2000 | 608 | 12.18 |
Nash must track down Rick Bettina, who escapes custody during his parole hearing, and recover the $2.5 million dollars in pension money he stole. Joe plays a modern-day Cyrano when the love affair between Dov and Amy abruptly ends, jeopardizing his remodel. Guest starring: Caroline Lagerfelt, and Daniel Roebuck in his last episode as Rick Bettina
| 109 | 9 | "The Messenger" | Ricardo Mendez Matta | Alan Ormsby | December 8, 2000 | 609 | 12.37 |
A madman guns down five people in an elevator, but leaves a young news reporter alive. Unfortunately, she's as interested in reporting the story as she is in catching the killer. Also: a woman steals Joe's car and commits a robbery using it. Guest starring: Caroline Lagerfelt
| 110 | 10 | "Grave Robbers" | Jim Charleston | Thom Bray | December 15, 2000 | 610 | 10.71 |
Nash must resurrect Tony B., who fakes his own death to escape a mob boss, only to discover that Tony's ripped the guy off and has good reason to want to be dead. Nash's ex-wife's past comes back to haunt him when he reveals that his ex was once dating this mob boss. Guest starring: Caroline Lagerfelt, and Stephen Lee as Tony B
| 111 | 11 | "Bear Trap" | Jan Eliasberg | Kim Beyer-Johnson & Damon Lindelof | January 12, 2001 | 611 | 12.05 |
Nash and Joe help a Canadian Mountie track down a ring of poachers who are illegally selling bear gallbladders, which are supposedly valuable as medicine and as an aphrodisiac; Rachel fears she may be pregnant.
| 112 | 12 | "Recover Me" | Jim Charleston | Reed Steiner & Carlton Cuse | January 26, 2001 | 612 | 10.08 |
Rachel is accused of murdering a man who was helping the police investigate corruption in an accounting firm, but Nash is convinced she was framed; Joe tries to find a ringer to represent the department in an arm-wrestling contest (and eventually finds Rulon Gardner).
| 113 | 13 | "Something Borrowed" | Bradford May | John Wirth & Michael Norell | February 2, 2001 | 613 | 11.16 |
Nash's former lover Tamara Van Zant forges his name on a marriage license and claims to be married to him in order to protect herself from a thug out to kill her; Nick pretends to be romantically involved with a lesbian friend to deflect suspicion from the woman's son, a high-profile gangster from Philadelphia, PA. Guest starring: Donna Scott as Tamara Van Zant
| 114 | 14 | "Out of Miami" | David Jackson | Carlton Cuse & John Wirth | February 9, 2001 | 614 | 11.03 |
Nash and a Federal marshal are taken hostage by a Miami drug lord who wants to exchange them for a witness who's scheduled to testify against him in court; Joe tries to get out of being audited by the IRS. Guest starring: Patrick Fischler Special guest star: Philip Michael Thomas
| 115 | 15 | "Slam Dunk" | Scott Brazil | Kim Beyer-Johnson & Damon Lindelof | February 16, 2001 | 615 | 10.66 |
Nash is suspicious of a teen's involvement in a brutal ambush that targeted a pair of lawyers, leaving one riddled with bullets and the survivor barely wounded. Meanwhile, Joe is burdened by an unwanted roommate, and Cassidy begins seeing Rachel's blind date. Guest starring: Armando Ortega, Dennis Boutsikaris, and J. P. Manoux
| 116 | 16 | "The Partner" | Jim Charleston | Alan Ormsby | March 9, 2001 | 616 | 8.76 |
Nash hunts for a vigilante who claims he's helping solve crimes by murdering deadly criminals, including a serial rapist; Nash's distant and eccentric cousin, who is also a cop, visits from Scotland. Special guest star: René Auberjonois
| 117 | 17 | "Blood Bots" | Greg Beeman | Thom Bray | March 30, 2001 | 617 | 9.27 |
Nash goes up against a gang of ruthless techno-geeks who are designing robots to perform robberies. Joe mistakenly sells a painting containing the Declaration of Independence at this yard sale and realizes he must do anything to get it back. Nick believes that he is going to die very soon. Guest starring: Tommy "Tiny" Lister as Mr. Switch, Louie Anderson as Joe's neighbor, with Tracey Walter as Angel, and Caroline Lagerfelt
| 118 | 18 | "Quack Fever" | Scott Brazil | Story : Hunter S. Thompson; Teleplay : Reed Steiner | April 6, 2001 | 618 | 9.46 |
Nash begins to believe that a 17-year-old boy involved in the Southeast Asian drug trade may be his missing brother's son; Cassidy starts dating a plastic surgeon and considers getting breast implants.
| 119 | 19 | "Kill Joy" | John Rubinstein | Paul Jackson & Tony Blake | April 13, 2001 | 619 | 8.91 |
Harvey becomes attracted to a fellow "Deadhead," a mysterious woman who is the target of a murderous stalker; Joe is promoted to Lieutenant, but discovers that his new duties mostly involve paperwork; Nick injures his leg and makes life difficult for Nash and Cassidy, who are just trying to take care of him. Guest starring: Caroline Lagerfelt, Suzanne Krull, Kellita Smith as Regina Adams Special guest stars: Jeff Fahey as Nelson Collions, Stephanie Zimbalist
| 120 | 20 | "Change Up" | Jim Charleston | John Wirth | April 20, 2001 | 620 | 8.87 |
Cassidy is suspended following her involvement in the fatal shooting of a bystander during a bank robbery and becomes the target of department cronies who want to use her to get rid of Nash. Guest starring: Suzanne Krull, Ned Vaughn, Claire Yarlett, Matt Gallini, John Haymes Newton Special guest star: Bill Smitrovich
| 121 | 21 | "Cat Fight" | Ricardo Mendez Matta | Reed Steiner & Damon Lindelof | April 27, 2001 | 621 | 9.61 |
A robbery at the Filmore during a concert by Phil Lesh prompts Nash to investigate a soccer coach and his daughter, a stolen motorcycle and a record producer. Guest starring: Suzanne Krull, Tommy "Tiny" Lister as Mr. Switch, with Christian J. Meoli as Boz Bishop, and Kool Moe Dee as Masta Blasta Special guest star: Bill Smitrovich
| 122 | 22 | "Fair Game" | Jim Charleston | Carlton Cuse & John Wirth | May 4, 2001 | 622 | 9.10 |
A serial killer who picks up passengers in a cab and then murders them stalks the city; Cassidy struggles with whether she wants to continue to be a cop. Guest starring: James Remar, Suzanne Krull, Marco Rodriguez Special guest star: Bill Smitrovich
