= Forero =

Forero is a Spanish surname, meaning "someone obliged to pay tribute" or "tribute collector".

== People with the name ==
- Efraín Forero Triviño (1930–2022), Colombian cyclist
- Enrique Forero (1942–2023), Colombian botanist
- Esther Forero (1919–2011), Colombian singer and composer
- Gabriel Forero Sanmiguel, Colombian journalist
- Gary Forero (born 1979), Colombian actor
- Juan Forero, Colombian-American journalist
- Juan Pablo Forero (born 1983), Colombian cyclist
- Laureano Forero Ochoa, Colombian architect
- María Forero (born 2002), Spanish athlete
- Sophia Forero, American jewelry designer
- Teófilo Forero (fl. 1960–1989), Colombian politician and trade unionist
- Vanessa Forero, English-Colombian singer-songwriter and author
