= The Low Life =

- Theatrical release poster
- Directed by: George Hickenlooper
- Written by: John Enbom; George Hickenlooper
- Starring: Sean Astin; Rory Cochrane; Ron Livingston; Jefferson Mays; Sara Melson; Christian Meoli; Kyra Sedgwick; Shawnee Smith; J. T. Walsh; Renée Zellweger; James LeGros
- Cinematography: Richard Crudo
- Edited by: Yaffa Lerea; Jim Makiej
- Music by: Bill Boll
- Distributed by: Cabin Fever Entertainment
- Release date: 1995
- Running time: 98 minutes
- Country: United States
- Language: English

The Low Life is a 1995 American film starring Rory Cochrane and directed and co-written by George Hickenlooper.

== Plot ==
A Yale graduate, with dreams of becoming a writer, moves to Hollywood and struggles with low-paying jobs, poverty, romance and slacker friends.

== Cast ==
- Rory Cochrane as John
- Sean Astin as Andrew
- Kyra Sedgwick as Bevan
- Renée Zellweger as Poet
- J. T. Walsh as Mike Sr.
- Ron Livingston as Chad
- James LeGros as Mike Jr.
- Antoni Corone as Louis
- Michael Massee as The Bartender
