= Christian Meoli =

American actor, writer, producer (born 1972)

Christian J. Meoli
- Born: July 6, 1972 (age 54); Philadelphia, Pennsylvania, U.S.
- Other name: Chris Voltaire
- Education: Temple University
- Occupations: Actor, writer, producer and film executive
- Known for: Cabaret Voltaire Inc.
- Spouse: Camilla Meoli

Christian Meoli (born July 6, 1972) is an actor, writer, producer who runs Voltaire Media and film executive.

== Early life ==
Christian Meoli was born on July 6, 1972, in Philadelphia, the son of Jerry Mayo (1934–2011), a band member of the group Freddie Bell and the Bellboys.

He began his acting career in his early teens in regional-theatre productions. He is an alumnus of Stagedoor Manor. He graduated from Performing Arts School in Philadelphia and received a scholarship to Temple University.

He appeared in the Washington/Baltimore company of the musical Tony n' Tina's Wedding in the role of bandleader "Donny Dulce". In 1991, Meoli appeared opposite Jason Miller and Malachy McCourt in a production of the play Inherit The Wind that was staged in a court in the Philadelphia City Hall.

== Career ==
Meoli began his acting career in the early 1990s, making his film debut as Federico Aranda in Alive (1993). Subsequently, he was cast in numerous film and television productions including a recurring role as Boz Bishop for four seasons on the CBS television series Nash Bridges.

Following the death of his mother, Sandra Meoli, from cancer, Meoli founded The Big C, a performance event for cancer survivors at Hollywood Presbyterian Medical Center and later established The Big C Foundation to support cancer education and outreach.

In addition to acting, Meoli has worked as a writer, producer, and entrepreneur. In 2003, he wrote the play The Dadaists, inspired by the Dada art movement and the founding of the Cabaret Voltaire in Zürich, and led Meoli to create a modern Cabaret Voltaire venue in Los Angeles. The Los Angeles Times credited him as organizing one of the first flash mobs in Los Angeles.

Meoli later served as the vice president for marketing at Bigfoot Entertainment and later expanded Voltaire Media into film production, sales, and distribution. In 2012, the company opened Arena Cinema Hollywood, an independent art-house theater in Los Angeles.

== Filmography ==
- Ray Donovan as Kevin (2012)
- Desperate Housewives, "What's the Good of Being Good" (TV series) as himself (2012)
- Should've Been Romeo as Eddie (2012)
- The Girl with No Number as Mr. Johnson (2011)
- Apocalypse According to Doris as Apperson (2011)
- Dollhouse, "Ghost" (TV series) as Thug 1 (2009)
- Eli Stone, "The Path" (TV series) as Janitor (2008)
- In Plain Sight, "Stan" by Me (TV series) as Jason (2008)
- Everybody Hates Chris (TV series) as himself (2008)
- Life-The Fallen Woman (TV series) as Ron (2007)
- Final Approach (TV movie) as himself (2007)
- Alias (TV series) as Semanko (2006)
- JAG, "Automatic for the People" (TV series) as P.O. Dave Mooney (2005)
- Joan of Arcadia, "The Gift" (TV series) as Ben Pollack (2004)
- The Division (TV series) as Vinnie Praiser (2004)
- Crossing Jordan, "Devil May Care" (TV series) as Seth Pale (2004)
- Cold Case, "Fly Away" (TV series) as Angel Rivera (2003)
- Without a Trace, "The Bus" (TV series) as Carl (2003)
- Looking for Jimmy as himself (2002)
- Wanderlust as Brian (2001)
- Nash Bridges (TV series) as Boz Bishop (1999–2001)
- Tuesdays with Morrie (TV movie) as Aldo (1999)
- The Practice, "Target Practice" (TV series) as Charles Best (1999)
- Walker, Texas Ranger, "Livegirls.now" as Rolf Gaines (1999)
- V.I.P., "One Wedding and Val's Funeral" (TV series) as Waiter (1998)
- The Secret Diary of Desmond Pfeiffer (TV series) as Telegraph Operator (1998)
- Martial Law, "Shanghai Express" (TV series) as Detective Jones (1998)
- Hitz, "Give the Drummer Some" (TV series) as Jimmy (1997)
- Bongwater as himself (1997)
- Persons Unknown as himself (1996)
- L.A. Firefighters, "Fuel and Spark" (TV series) as Freddy the Store Manager (1996)
- Boy Meets World, "Turkey Day" (TV series) as Carl (1996)
- The Pretender, "The Paper Clock" as Marcus Whittaker (1996)
- Dogtown as Mickey Jenks (1996)
- NYPD Blue, "The Girl Talk" (TV series) as Phil Farr (1996)
- The Naked Truth (TV series) as Vanjacker (1996)
- The Low Life as Leonard (1995)
- Cleghorne!, "This Magic Moment" (TV series) as Magini the Magician (1995)
- Chicago Hope, "Wild Cards" (TV series) as Luigi (1995)
- Weird Science, "Quantum Wyatt" (TV series) as Dangerous Felon (1995)
- Ellen, "The Christmas Show" as Grunge Guy (1994)
- Nunzio's Second Cousin (short) as himself (1994)
- In This Corner as Julio (1994)
- Beverly Hills, 90210 (TV series) as Pablo (1993)
- Alive as Federico Aranda (1993)
