= Diana Uribe =

Colombian radio host (born 1959)

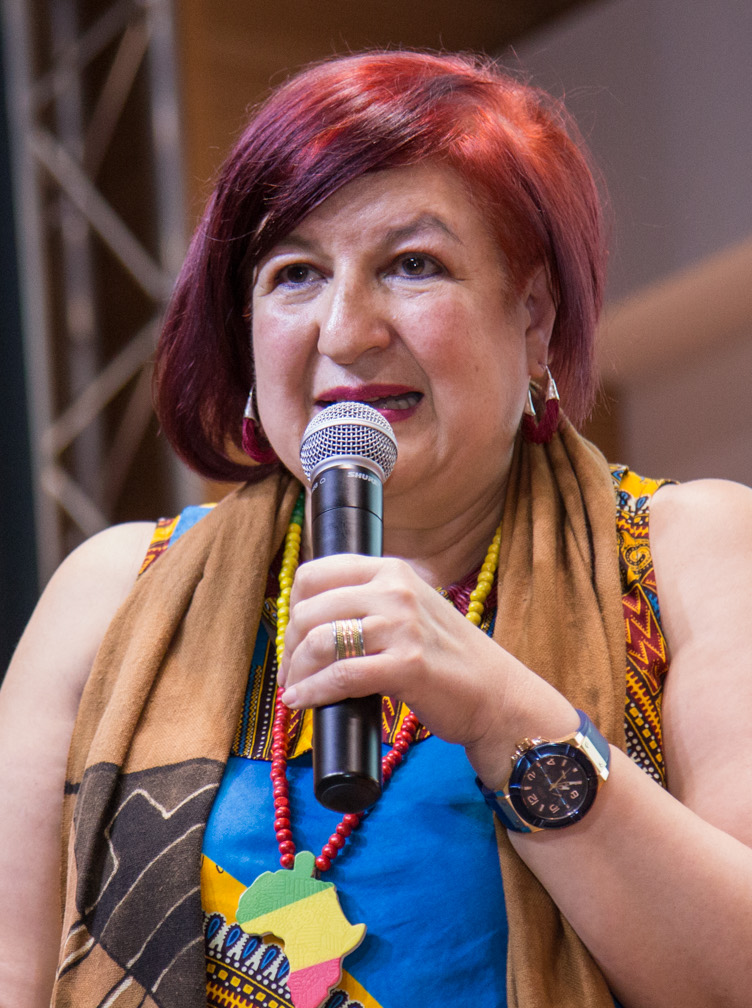
- Born: Diana Uribe Forero; March 30, 1959 (age 67); Bogotá, Colombia
- Education: University of the Andes
- Occupations: Radio host, podcaster, writer
- Spouse: Ricardo Espinosa (m. 1982; died 2012)
- Children: 2

Diana Uribe Forero (Note: In this name that follows Hispanic American naming customs, the first or paternal surname is Uribe and the second or maternal family name is Forero.) (born March 30, 1959) is a Colombian radio host, podcaster, and writer specializing in world history. From 2000 to 2018, she hosted the Sunday educational program La historia del mundo (lit. 'The History of the World'), first on RadioNet then on Caracol Radio. Since 2018, she has produced the podcast on history and current events DianaUribe.fm. She has also written and narrated several books and audiobooks on world history.

== Early life and education ==
Uribe was born in Bogotá and lived in Chicago between the ages of two and ten while her father studied industrial engineering. She has said her interest in history came from conversations at home, books on subjects such as the Spanish Civil War, the television programs of Alberto Dangond Uribe, and an early enthusiasm for rock and soul music.

She studied philosophy and humanities at the University of the Andes, graduating in 1983 with a thesis on the Woodstock generation and the construction of a utopia, a philosophical reading of the 1960s counterculture in the United States.

She taught philosophy, English, history, and literature in secondary schools in Bogotá, and later at the Pontificia Universidad Javeriana, the University of the Andes, the Jorge Tadeo Lozano University, and the Universidad Externado de Colombia.

== Radio and podcasting ==
Uribe began working in radio in 1994 on the weekly program Imaginarios del rock (lit. 'Rock Imaginaries') on the radio station of the National University of Colombia. The journalist Yamid Amat later recruited her as an international analyst for the now-defunct network RadioNet after hearing a lecture she gave on the Yugoslav Wars.

In 2000, she began the Sunday morning program La historia del mundo (lit. 'The History of the World'), first on RadioNet and then on Caracol Radio. Colombian news outlets have credited the program with changing how audiences approached the history of Colombia and of the world. El País has described her voice as hoarse but clear and well modulated, and her delivery as conversational and full of regional slang. Music was a recurring subject of the program, and songs from the periods she covered were woven into the broadcasts.

In 2002, the program received the Simón Bolívar National Journalism Award for cultural work in radio. In 2011, she received the Gusi Peace Prize in the Philippines for her radio work promoting tolerance.

Uribe also worked as an international analyst for Caracol Televisión's news program at the start of the 2003 invasion of Iraq, and has appeared on the network's program Entre ojos ("Between Eyes").

In 2018, Uribe ended the radio program and launched the independently produced podcast DianaUribe.fm. Explaining the reasoning in an interview, Uribe cited how the change would allow for more elaborate post-production, more music, and a clearer sound.

DianaUribe.fm is produced primarily in thematic series. Some series focus on aspects of Colombia, Latin America, or other regions in the world. Many follow histories of subjects such as coffee, medicine, the internet, universities, and the history of women. Uribe also publishes one-off segments on current events and her travel.

== Books and audiobooks ==
Uribe's books are published together with audio recordings that she narrates herself. She has written several of them with her daughter, Alejandra Espinosa Uribe, beginning with Contracultura, which returned to the subject of Uribe's undergraduate thesis on the 1960s counterculture.

- Siglo XX: historia viva [The 20th Century: Living History] (audiobook, three cassettes).
- Historia de las grandes independencias [History of the Great Independence Movements]. Aguilar, 2009. 262 pp. ISBN 978-958-704-914-5
- Historia de las civilizaciones [History of Civilizations]. Aguilar / Caracol Radio, 2009. 223 pp., with six CDs. ISBN 978-958-704-798-1
- La historia en los viajes [History in Travel]. 2011. ISBN 978-958-758-290-1
- 125 años de historia narrada por Diana Uribe [125 Years of History Narrated by Diana Uribe] (Audiobook). El Espectador, 2012.
- 100 momentos que marcaron el mundo contemporáneo [100 Moments That Shaped the Contemporary World]. Aguilar, 2013. ISBN 978-958-758-596-4
- África, nuestra tercera raíz [Africa, Our Third Root]. Aguilar, 2014. ISBN 978-958-58636-0-6
- La vuelta al mundo en 25 mitos [Around the World in 25 Myths]. 2015. ISBN 978-958-5429-25-3
- Contracultura. Los movimientos de los años 60 hacia la utopía [Counterculture: The Movements of the Sixties Toward Utopia], with Alejandra Espinosa Uribe. Aguilar, 2016. ISBN 978-958-8912-77-6
- Brújula para el mundo contemporáneo [A Compass for the Contemporary World]. 2018. ISBN 978-958-5425-89-7
- Revoluciones: movimientos que transformaron la historia de la humanidad [Revolutions: Movements That Transformed the History of Humanity], with Alejandra Espinosa Uribe. 2020. ISBN 978-958-5549-59-3
- Mujeres a través de la historia [Women Through History], with María Emilia Gouffray and Alejandra Espinosa Uribe. Aguilar, 2024. ISBN 978-628-7539-98-3
