= Gabriel Forero Sanmiguel =

Colombian journalist

Gabriel Forero Sanmiguel, a well-known Colombian journalist who used to work from his home in the city of Barranquilla (Atlantico), Colombia, for many years. He created the daily news radio program "Forero Sanmiguel Informa" He also was the Co-founder of the Radio Station "La Voz de la Costa".

Forero introduced a new style of radio in Barranquilla, offering the public the broadcasting of popular instrumental music from all over the world, limited advertisement and international news. He worked with his wife Enohe de Forero (a.k.a.) Martica, several of his children and Fanny Esther Castellar as a broadcaster, who was also his secretary.

The Universidad Autónoma del Caribe recognized Mr Gabriel Forero San Miguel with the Vida y Obra (Life and work) award in 2007.
