= Angela Dohrmann =

American actress and television personality

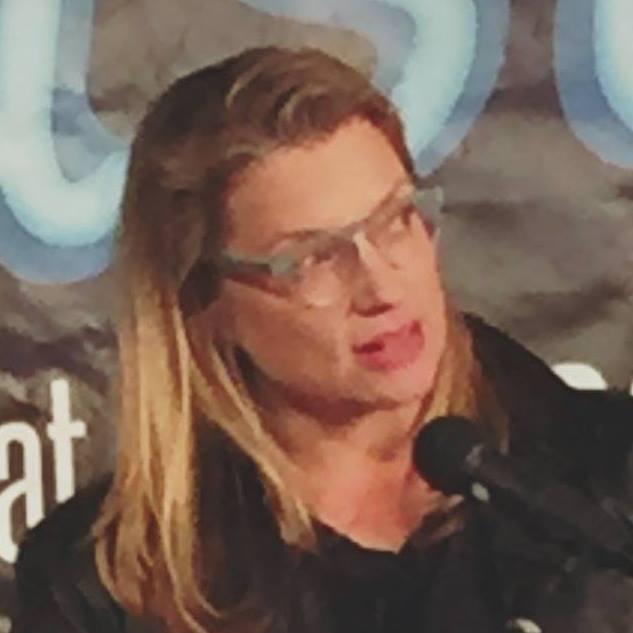
- Dohrmann at Ensemble Studio Theatre, July 2016
- Occupation(s): Actress, television personality
- Years active: 1987–present
- Style: Improvisational theatre, Comedy, Stage (theatre)

Angela Dohrmann is an American actress and television personality.

She was a VJ for MuchMusic, the Canadian music video channel, in the early 1990s. She also pursued a career in acting, with a supporting role in the CBC Television sitcom Material World. After leaving MuchMusic, she returned to the United States and pursued acting roles, including guest appearances on Seinfeld (as Donna Chang in the episode "The Chinese Woman"), Ellen and Star Trek: Voyager, and recurring roles on The Drew Carey Show and Nash Bridges.
