= Sophia Forero =

American jewelry designer

- Education: University of Illinois at Urbana-Champaign
- Occupation: Jewelry designer

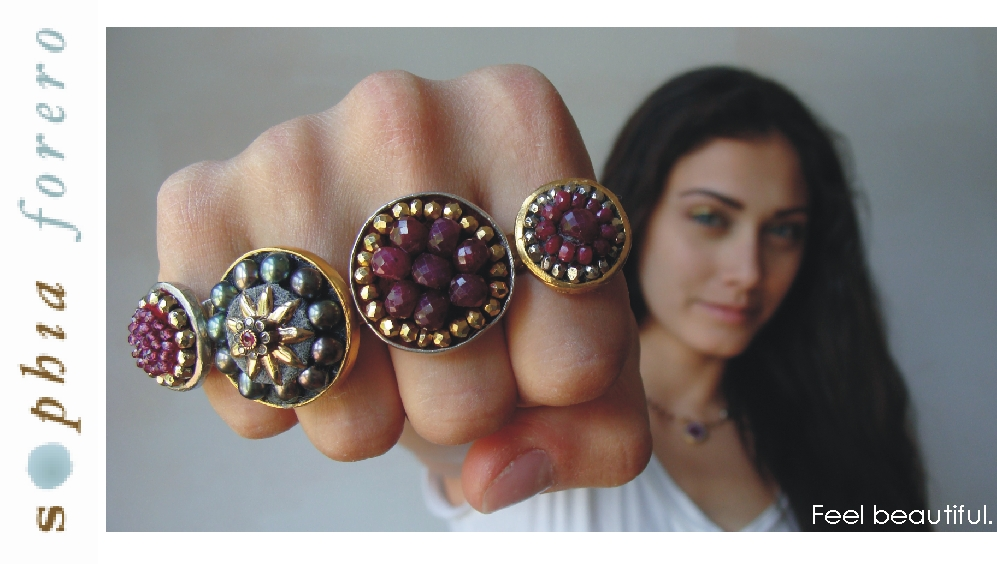
Mosaic rings.

Sophia Forero is a jewelry designer. She creates jewelry with colors and textures inspired by her study of international cultures, including Tuareg culture and Byzantine art.

== Biography ==
Educated at the University of Illinois at Urbana-Champaign for her undergraduate degree and then at the University of Chicago for her Master's, Sophia Forero lived in Eastern Europe working for the US Peace Corps as a teacher. She first became interested in designing jewelry while writing her masters thesis on indigenous cultures of Sub-Saharan Africa. While in the Peace Corps in Hungary, she visited bead factories and gathered materials from all over Europe, the former Soviet Union, and the Balkans.

In 2002, Sophia won Marshall Field's Distinction in Design award, coming in first place over hundreds of designers. In 2004, Fashion Group International selected Sophia Forero Jewels as its 2004 recipient of the Style Makers & Rule Breakers award. The award "honors Sophia Forero as a trendsetter in the Accessories category...(and) identifies Sophia Forero as an innovator, a creator, a visionary and a formidable talent in the fashion and design industries."

In 2013, Sophia completed the Goldman Sachs 10,000 Small Businesses program, an initiative to help businesses launch the next stage of growth. To date, SFD is set to introduce an augmented series to the mosaic collection with diamond and sapphire. Using the talents of sculptor Mauricio Forero to create new designs, the couple will unveil the Caviar collection in 2014.

Sophia lives and works in Illinois with her husband and four children.
