= Nash Bridges =

American police procedural television series (1996–2001)

- Genre: Comedy-drama; Police procedural
- Created by: Carlton Cuse
- Starring: Don Johnson; Cheech Marin; Jodi Lyn O'Keefe; Jeff Perry; Jaime P. Gomez; Cary-Hiroyuki Tagawa; Serena Scott Thomas; Annette O'Toole; James Gammon; Mary Mara; Kelly Hu; Yasmine Bleeth; Wendy Moniz; Cress Williams
- Theme music composer: Elia Cmiral (original); Eddie Jobson ("I Got a Friend in You"); Velton Ray Bunch
- Ending theme: Velton Ray Bunch
- Composers: Elia Cmiral; Eddie Jobson; Velton Ray Bunch
- Country of origin: United States
- Original language: English
- No. of seasons: 6
- No. of episodes: 122 (list of episodes)

Production
- Executive producers: Carlton Cuse; Don Johnson; John Wirth; John Nicolella
- Producers: Reed Steiner; Jed Seidel; Greg Beeman; Morgan Gendel; Frederick J. Lyle; Pattee Roedig; Burt Bluestein; David Calloway
- Production locations: San Francisco, California; San Francisco Bay Area
- Running time: 60 min (including commercials)
- Production companies: The Don Johnson Company; Carlton Cuse Productions; Rysher Entertainment (seasons 1–4); Paramount Television (seasons 5–6)

Original release
- Network: CBS
- Release: March 29, 1996 – May 4, 2001

Nash Bridges is an American police procedural television series created by Carlton Cuse. The show stars Don Johnson and Cheech Marin as two inspectors with the San Francisco Police Department's Special Investigations Unit (SIU).

The series ran for six seasons on CBS from March 29, 1996, to May 4, 2001. A total of 122 episodes aired.

A TV film was aired on the USA Network in 2021.

== Premise ==
Nash Bridges stars Don Johnson as the eponymous Nash Bridges, an inspector (and later captain) with the San Francisco Police Department's elite "Special Investigations Unit". The show begins with Bridges in his 40s, twice-divorced, and co-parenting his teenage daughter, Cassidy (Jodi Lyn O'Keefe). Nash convinces recently retired Inspector Joe Dominguez (Cheech Marin), to return to the force and partner with him. Nash and Joe cruise the streets of San Francisco in Nash's 1971 Plymouth Barracuda convertible, a gift from Nash's brother Bobby just before Bobby left for the Vietnam War. The car was originally to be painted Curious Yellow, but was switched to factory Caterpillar Yellow, due to lighting and camera appearances. The car was portrayed by several replicas of a 1971 Hemi 'Cuda convertible.

Bobby Bridges was reported as MIA, but turns up in the season 3 episode "Revelations", played by Jan-Michael Vincent. Nash's father, Nick (James Gammon), has mild dementia and has a habit of getting kicked out of nursing homes. He eventually moves in with Nash, and is often involved in comic subplots that are intertwined with some of the show's dark humor themes.

Aiding Nash in his police work is the technically savvy Harvey Leek (Jeff Perry), a middle-aged "Deadhead" (a die hard Grateful Dead fan). Another is the young, hotheaded Evan Cortez (Jaime P. Gomez), who has an off-and-on relationship with Cassidy. In later seasons, other inspectors and supporting characters were added or removed from the cast.

For the first sixteen episodes, the commander of the SIU was Lieutenant A. J. Shimamura (Cary-Hiroyuki Tagawa), a character who was said to have returned to his native Hawaii after failing to be promoted to captain. Shimamura's departure opened the door for Bridges to be promoted to captain and given command of the SIU.

== Episodes ==
Season	Episodes	Originally released	
Season	Episodes	First released	Last released
1	8	March 29, 1996	May 17, 1996
2	23	September 13, 1996	May 2, 1997
3	23	September 19, 1997	May 15, 1998
4	24	September 25, 1998	May 14, 1999
5	22	September 24, 1999	May 19, 2000
6	22	October 6, 2000	May 4, 2001

== Cast and characters ==
Cheech Marin (left) with Don Johnson.

=== Main ===
- Don Johnson as Inspector/Acting Lieutenant/Captain Nash Bridges: Nash is a seasoned police Inspector in his 40s, with a lifelong devotion to the SFPD. He's got a photographic memory and a tendency to call everyone "Bubba" or "Sister." His personal life isn't as balanced as his professional one, starting with his two divorces and a strained relationship with both his aged father and a daughter. An amateur magician with a talent for handcuff tricks, Don Johnson is the only member of the cast to appear in all 122 episodes of the series.
- Cheech Marin as Inspector/Lieutenant Joe Dominguez: At the start of the series, Insp. Dominguez is talked out of retirement to partner with Nash. He is married to a statuesque Swedish woman, Inger, and together they have a daughter, Lucia, and a son, JJ. Dominguez's character is light-hearted, often making witty, off-the-cuff observations at crime scenes. He has a penchant for getting involved in get-rich quick schemes, often having to be rescued by Nash. The details of Nash and Dominguez's relationship (and why they are such close friends) is revealed during the course of the series: As a young cop with a bright future, Dominguez ruined his reputation by being busted for a DUI. The only person to stand by him was his partner at the time, later revealed to be Nash. In later seasons, Nash and Joe form a private detective agency to make extra money.
- Jodi Lyn O'Keefe as Cassidy Bridges: Nash's daughter who originally aspired to be an actress. Cassidy had a tough relationship with Evan that had them eventually reconciling and about to marry, before Evan was killed. This inspired Cassidy to join the SFPD after his death. She was then assigned to the SIU as a plain-clothes officer, under her father's command. By the end of the series, Cassidy relocated to Paris to be with her mother.
- Jeff Perry as Inspector Harvey Leek: A die-hard Grateful Dead fan with a technical background. His wife left him after 5 1/2 years of marriage because of his commitment to police work. Best friend to Evan and one of Nash's team, and very passionate about his '72 Ford Ranchero. The Ranchero is seen in the series almost as often as Nash's Barracuda until the car was irreparably damaged in a shootout near the end of the fifth season.
- Jaime P. Gomez as Inspector Evan Cortez (seasons 1–5): Best friend to Harvey and the youngest partner of Nash, who suggested he rejoin working with Joe at the beginning of the series. Evan reminded Nash of what he used to be long ago. He had a stormy relationship with Cassidy, which after many ups and downs, ended when he was killed in the line of duty. Evan had reconciled with Cassidy at the time and was engaged to her for a Las Vegas wedding. Previous to that, Evan went through a painful period during the fifth season after his breakup with Cassidy (after he'd cheated on her on the eve of their wedding) and the loss of his job as a drunk on a downward spiral. With Joe's intervention and his own participation in a 12-Step Alcoholics Anonymous program, the character became a Christian and recovering alcoholic. Jaime Gomez appeared in all but six episodes of the series' first five seasons.
- Cary-Hiroyuki Tagawa as Lieutenant A. J. Shimamura (seasons 1 & 2): A former police superior who worked closely with Nash and the SIU as both co-worker and friend. A. J. held true to a promise that if he wasn't promoted to captain, he would leave the force and move back to his native Hawaii, which occurred during the second season.
- Serena Scott Thomas as Kelly Bridges (seasons 1 & 2; guest season 3): A socialite and former drug addict, and Nash's second ex-wife. She moved to Europe to reunite with her long lost daughter during the second season.
- Annette O'Toole as Lisa Bridges (seasons 1 & 2; guest seasons 3 & 4): A caterer by trade, she is Nash's ex-wife and mother of Cassidy. She moved to Paris after she and Nash revealed their true feelings to each other.
- James Gammon as Nick Bridges (seasons 2–6; recurring season 1): Nash's retired longshoreman father who lives with him. He sometimes gets into some minor trouble which leaves Nash to save him. He also tends to get involved in Joe Dominguez's get rich quick schemes. Nick has light dementia and that affliction was dealt with thoughtfully throughout the series. A source of conflict between him and his son was the character's preference for his older son, Bobby Bridges, over Nash.
- Mary Mara as Inspector Bryn Carson (season 2; guest seasons 1 & 3): The only female member of the SIU at the beginning of the series, she was often used to go undercover when a woman's role was needed. She was not known to have a very successful romantic life. She transferred out of the SIU at the start of the third season.
- Kelly Hu as Inspector Michelle Chan (season 3; guest season 4): An aggressive inspector whom Nash took under his wing as a protégé. She was killed in cold blood early in the fourth season by the Prowler, a killer seeking media glory whom Nash killed out of revenge and claimed it as self-defense.
- Yasmine Bleeth as Inspector Caitlin Cross (seasons 4 & 5): She had a tense relationship with Nash bordering on the unprofessional. Caitlin originally came to the SIU as an MCD Inspector investigating them, but eventually joined them. She had a brief romance with Nash, which ended when she left at the end of the fifth season to help her sister in Washington, D.C.
- Wendy Moniz as Inspector Rachel McCabe (season 6): Cassidy's senior partner and a new addition to the SIU in the final season. Rachel was a police officer originally working undercover for a corrupt Internal Affairs official. She eventually fell in love with Nash and later sacrificed her career to save Nash when she realized he was being framed.
- Cress Williams as Inspector Antwon Babcock (season 6): Evan's replacement in the final season. Antwon rescued the SIU from an explosion when he drove a car off a pier on his first day. He preferred to stay out of personal situations, but was very active in the force. He became close friends with Harvey, particularly when Harvey convinced him to reconcile with his father, a dying criminal. He occasionally suffered from epileptic seizures.

=== Recurring ===
- Daniel Roebuck as Inspector Rick Bettina: A crooked SIU police officer turned criminal and a frequent headache to the SIU. In the beginning of the series, he considers Nash (who dislikes Rick) his best friend and at one point was Nash's boss as Rick's mother married the chief of police and gave him a job. Towards the end of the series, he tries to kill Nash and Joe, to cover-up his attempted rip-off of the police retirement fund.
- Angela Dohrmann as Stacy Bridges (seasons 1–4): Nash's ADA sister.
- Stephen Lee as Tony B: Mobster and police informant.
- Patrick Fischler as Pepe: Joe and Nash's gay friend, and secretary of their detective agency.
- Caroline Lagerfelt as Inger Dominguez (seasons 2–6): Joe's spouse from Sweden and mother of their infant child, and mother of Joe's adult son. A kind woman and loving wife, also the one really in charge of their household.
- Tracey Walter as Angel (seasons 2–6): A wise spiritual figure who often appears when dispensing advice to Nash as his guardian angel. Dressed as an angel, complete with wings, he wanders the streets of San Francisco.
- Ronald Russell II as Sergeant Ronnie (seasons 2–6): He's the all around handyman and muscle of the SIU.
- Christian J. Meoli as Boz Bishop (seasons 3–6): A young rap music inspired employee of Nash and Joe's private investigation agency. A fast talking young man with aspirations to be a private investigator. In reality, Boz is loaded with money and comes from a well-to-do English family. Boz's family lives in the Dunsmuir Hellman Historic Estate in Oakland.
- Suki Kaiser as Lynette Summers (season 3): The sister of Nash's first ex-wife. While Lisa is in Paris, studying French cookery, Cassidy stays with her aunt in San Francisco.
- Donna W. Scott as Tamara Van Zant (seasons 3–4 & 6): A con-woman and sometimes Nash's lover. In season 6, she's stabbed and thrown overboard by mobster Vinnie Corell (Costas Mandylor) in the episode "Something Borrowed".
- Stone Cold Steve Austin as Inspector Jake Cage (seasons 4–5): A former protégé of Bridges now working in Fugitive Retrieval, who occasionally aids the SIU.
- Alie Ward as Miranda (seasons 4–6): Cassidy's roommate.
- Tim Ransom as Frankie Dwyer (guest season 2, recurring season 5): A greedy and ambitious gangster who repeatedly clashes with Nash.

== Production ==
The show was produced and filmed on location in the San Francisco Bay Area. The show shot on the streets of San Francisco including The Embarcadero and Piers 30 through 32. Neighboring Treasure Island was used as the headquarters for the show. Hangar 2 on Treasure Island was the location of permanent sets including Nash's apartment The show employed several hundred local workers including production crews and staff members, carpenters, electricians, set designers, grips, set dressers, props, scenic artists, location managers, costumers, drivers, cameramen, special effects, soundmen, makeup and hair stylists and production assistants. Episode production was nearly $2 million per episode.

Nash Bridges premiered on March 29, 1996, at 10:00pm on CBS.

The show was produced by the Don Johnson Company and Carlton Cuse Productions in association with Rysher Entertainment for the first 4 seasons. In 1999, Paramount Network Television took over Rysher's spot after acquiring that company.

The show used three different main theme songs during its initial run. Season 1 used primarily an instrumental piece written by Elia Cmíral. Seasons 2–5 used the theme "I Got a Friend in You" written by Eddie Jobson and sung by Gigi MacKenzie and is by far the most well-known of the show's opening themes. Season 6 changed the theme again, using another primarily instrumental piece with a bit of a techno beat to it, this time written by Velton Ray Bunch. A fourth song, also written by Cmíral which was Johnson's original choice, sometimes replaces the first season song in syndication.

=== Cancellation ===
The sixth season of Nash Bridges would be its last; however, the show was obtaining fair ratings from Nielsen. Following its Friday night ratings battle (which it was losing to NBC's Law & Order: Special Victims Unit), the show was canceled. Paramount Network Television, which was producing the show, felt that its $2 million per episode production cost was too much. CBS was hoping to get a seventh season out of Nash Bridges, but that failed because Paramount wasn't willing to pay, even though at the time, Viacom owned both CBS and Paramount.

"Don was already exploring other opportunities. Doing a TV series five days a week for as long as he did is an exhausting task. Don was ready to move on."

— Elliot Mintz, Don Johnson's Publicist

Another factor that led to the ending of the series was that Don Johnson wanted out. Johnson was getting tired, and CBS and Paramount had enough episodes to put the series into syndication.

Carlton Cuse went on to become the showrunner for Lost. Lost co-creator Damon Lindelof had started his television writing career on Nash Bridges. He sought out Cuse's advice on how to run Lost.

== Broadcast ==
The show has aired in over 70 countries. It currently airs in the Middle East on MBC's newly launched Action block MBC Action, Crime & Investigation Network, WGN America, Universal HD in the United States, TV1 in Australia, 13th Street in The Netherlands and Universal Channel in Serbia and on CBS Action in the United Kingdom. The series currently airs on H&I weekdays at 10 a.m. ET.

== Home media ==
CBS DVD (distributed by Paramount) released the first three seasons of Nash Bridges on DVD in 2008/2009.

On September 10, 2014, it was announced that Visual Entertainment (VEI) has sub-licensed the rights to the series from CBS and would release a complete series collection in early 2015. It was subsequently released on November 18, 2014. The 27-disc set contains all 122 episodes of the series. The complete series was reissued by VEI as a 22-disc set in November 2016 to coincide with the anticipated blu-ray release.

VEI released the complete series on Blu-ray in November 2016 as a 16-disc set.

On February 10, 2015, VEI released season 4 on DVD as a separate season set. They also re-released the first three seasons on DVD on March 3, 2015.

In Region 4, Shock Entertainment has released the first three seasons on DVD in Australia.

King Records is releasing all of the seasons on DVD in Region 2, specifically through the Japanese market.

DVD name	Ep#	Release dates		
DVD name	Ep#	Region 1	Region 2	Region 4
The 1st Season	8	October 14, 2008	October 6, 2010	March 9, 2010
The 2nd Season	23	March 3, 2009	March 3, 2011	May 12, 2010
The 3rd Season	23	November 10, 2009	June 8, 2011	July 7, 2010
The 4th Season	24	February 10, 2015	September 7, 2011	n/a
The 5th Season	22	May 12, 2015	December 17, 2011	n/a
The 6th Season	22	June 9, 2015	March 7, 2012	n/a
The Complete Series	122	November 18, 2014	n/a	n/a
The Complete Series (Reissue)	122	November 25, 2016	n/a	n/a
The Complete Series (Blu-ray)	122	November 18, 2016	n/a	n/a

As of 2025, the series is available for streaming on the Plex Inc. streaming service, in which its rights are held by Lionsgate.

== Revival TV film - Nash Bridges (2021) ==
On July 18, 2019, it was reported that USA Network was working with Village Roadshow Entertainment Group, which controlled the Rysher Entertainment intellectual property, to revive Nash Bridges. The show would reportedly have series star Don Johnson reprising the titular role and serving as one of the showrunners for the project. It was reported to be a two-hour special which, if successful, could serve as a backdoor pilot for a revival of the series. This revival would follow Nash, still running the SFPD's SIU and working to adjust to a new boss and to the changes of San Francisco in the 2020s. In May 2021, further casting for the television film was announced, with series stars Cheech Marin and Jeff Perry reported to return for the film along with Johnson.

The film premiered on November 27, 2021. In January 2022, the revival was nominated for the Outstanding TV Movie at the 33rd GLAAD Media Awards.

The cast includes Jeff Perry from the original series, Joe Dinicol, Diarra Kilpatrick, Angela Ko, Paul James, Alexia Garcia, and Bonnie Somerville. The film was written by Bill Chais and directed by Greg Beeman.

=== Reception ===
The Minnesota Star Tribune review said that the aging Johnson is no longer nimble but has charm, that Cheech Marin provides comic relief, that the villain resembles Jeffrey Epstein, and "despite some gruesome crimes, this is a lot of silly fun." Niall Browne at Movies in Focus wrote, "Nash and Joe remain one of TV’s great detective pairings. [...] shot with verve, the new incarnation of Nash Bridges is stylistically inline with the original, [...] bright and vibrant and it’ll make you want to visit San Francisco. [...] a throwback, but it feels [...] refreshing." Brian Lowry at CNN wrote, "Marin’s character has found success running a cannabis dispensary. [...] Whether fans will be glad [about the revival] remains to be seen, but the whole thing is breezy in a way that could easily go up in smoke."
